= Hisar Heights =

Hilly ridge in SE Bulgaria

- Bulgarian: Хисарски височини
- Location within Bulgaria

Highest point
- Peak: Hisar
- Elevation: 408 m (1,339 ft)
- Coordinates: 42°37′30″N 26°57′43″E

Dimensions
- Length: 35 km (22 mi) west-east
- Width: 8 km (5.0 mi) north-south

Geography
- Country: Bulgaria

The Hisar Heights (Bulgarian: Хисарски височини) are a hilly ridge in southeastern Bulgaria. Administratively, they lie in Burgas Province.

The Hisar Heights are situated between the Burgas Plain to the southeast, the Aytos Valley to the east and northeast, the Karnobat Valley to the north and the Sliven Valley to the west. To the northwest the gorge of the Mochuritsa, a left tributary of the river Tundzha, separates them from the Terziyski Ridge of the Balkan Mountains, to the north a low saddle (188 m) links them to the Karnobat Mountain of the Balkan Mountains and to the southwest a chain of small hills connects them to the Bakadzhitsite Heights.

The Hisar Heights span 30–35 km in direction west–southwest to east–northeast and reach a width of 7–8 km. The highest point is Hisar (402.8 m), rising some 1.7 km southwest of the town of Karnobat. In the southwest, south, east and northeast its slopes gradually sink into the neighbouring plains. The heights are formed by andesite and andesite tuffs. The climate is transitional continental. The soils are mostly cinnamon forest. The Hisar Heights are mostly deforested and are covered with extensive pastures, favourable for livestock breeding and husbandry.

Apart from the town of Karnobat lying on their northern foothills, there are ten villages on the slopes of the Hisar Heights: Vinarsko, Dragantsi, Dragovo, Karanovo, Kozare, Krumovo Gradishte, Pirne, Sokolovo, Hadzhiite and Chukarka. Along their southern slopes runs a section of the Trakiya motorway. There are three other roads of the national system passing through the Hisar Heights: a 26.1 km stretch of the first class I-6 road Gyueshevo–Sofia–Karlovo–Burgas along the northern foothills between the bridge over Mochuritsa and the junction to Pirne, an 8 km section of the third class III-538 road Sredets–Troyanovo–Aytos in the easternmost part between Vratitsa and Karnobat, and a 10.7 km section of the third class III-795 road Zhitosvyat–Karnobat in the highest central area between Dragantsi and Karnobat.
