= Pomorie Municipality =

Coordinates: 42°37′N 27°34′E

Pomorie Municipality Община Поморие
- Municipality (Obshtina)
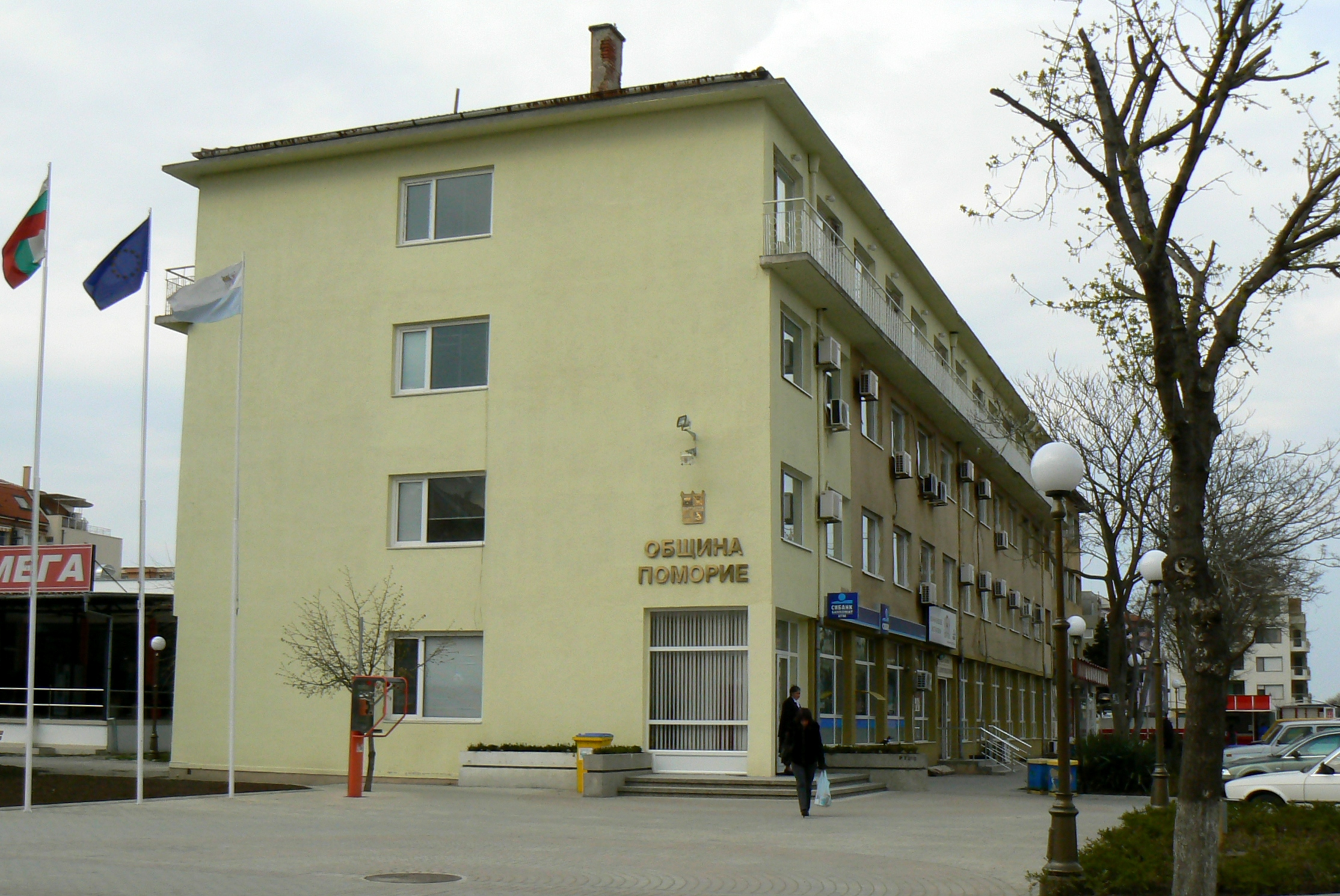
- Building of Pomorie Municipality, 2010

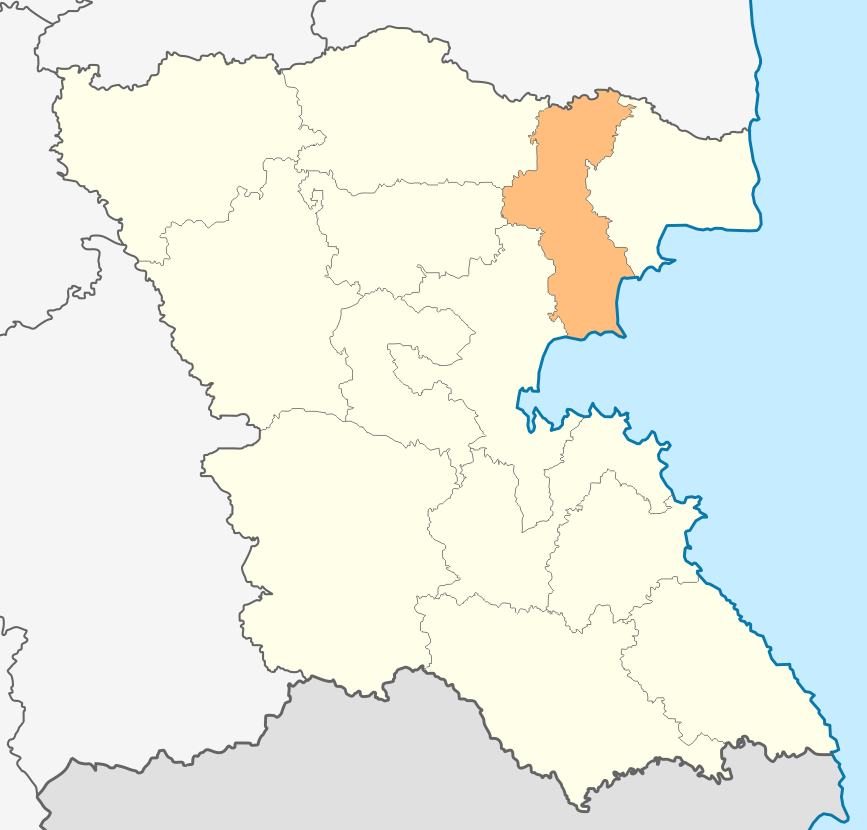
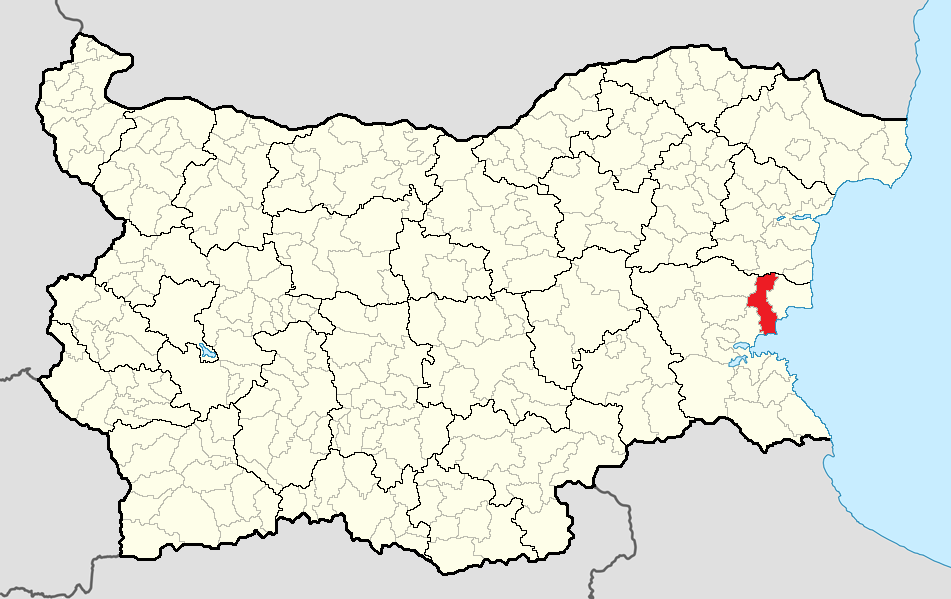
- Location in Burgas province Location on map of Bulgaria
- Country: Bulgaria
- Province (Oblast): Burgas
- Seat: Pomorie

Area
  - Total: 413.19 km^{2} (159.53 sq mi)

Population
  - Total: 27,780
  - Density: 67.23/km^{2} (174.1/sq mi)
- Time zone: UTC+2 (EET)
  - Summer (DST): UTC+3 (EEST)
- Website: www.pomorie.org

Pomorie Municipality (Bulgarian: Община Поморие, Obshtina Pomorie) is located in the Burgas Province, Bulgaria. The territory is 413.3 km^{2} and the population is 28,572. The main economic activities are tourism, wine industry and grape growing.

== Climate ==
The Pomorie Municipality experiences a mild climate, especially in the winters which see little precipitation.

== Natural resources ==
Black-sand beaches containing magnetic compounds can be visited near the town of Pomorie.

Several natural regions are located in the Pomorie Municipality. These include the Pomoriysko Lake (Lake Pomorie), Chairite, Koriata and the Dobrovanski Gabi. Lake Pomorie is a natural hyper-saline lagoon north of the town of Pomorie. Parts of the lake have been turned into salt-pans.

== Subdivision ==
There are three sub-regions of the territory which include the Black Sea coast, the Tundzhanska undulating plain and the Eastern Stara Planina.

The center is the town of Pomorie. The settlements in the municipality include the following 14 villages and 2 towns (in bold):

- Aleksandrovo
- **Aheloy**
- Bata
- Belodol
- Dabnik
- Gaberovo
- Galabets
- Goritsa
- **Kableshkovo**
- Kamenar
- Kosovets
- Kozichino
- Laka
- Medovo
- Poroy
- Stratsin

== Demographics ==
=== Religion ===
According to the latest Bulgarian census of 2011, the religious composition, among those who answered the optional question on religious identification, was the following:

Religious composition of Pomorie Municipality
Orthodox Christianity	68.5%
Catholicism	0.4%
Protestantism	2.4%
Islam	17.2%
No religion	2.2%
Prefer not to answer, others and indefinable	9.3%
