= Chukarska reka =

Location
- Country: Bulgaria

Physical characteristics
- Source
  - location: Hisar Heights
  - coordinates: 42°38′52.08″N 27°5′57.84″E
  - elevation: 325 m (1,066 ft)
- Mouth
  - location: Lake Burgas → Black Sea
  - coordinates: 42°29′35.88″N 27°20′38.04″E
  - elevation: 1 m (3 ft 3 in)
- Length: 37 km (23 mi)
- Basin size: 129 km^{2} (50 sq mi)

The Chukarska reka (Bulgarian: Чукарска река) is a 37 km long river in eastern Bulgaria that flows into Lake Burgas, which drains into the Black Sea.

The river takes its source from the northern slope of the peak of Shumnoto Kale (376 m) in the Hisar Heights at an altitude of 325 m, about one kilometer west of the village of Chukarka. It flows in direction southeast through the Burgas Plain in a wide valley covered with farmlands. The river flows into the westernmost edge of Lake Burgas some 3 km southwest of the Dolno Ezerovo neighbourhood of the city of Burgas. The lake itself drains into the Gulf of Burgas in the Black Sea.

Its drainage basin covers a territory of 129 km^{2}. It borders the basins of Aytoska reka to the northeast, the Rusokastrenska reka to the southeast, both flowing into the Black Sea, and shares a short boundary with the Tundzha basin to the northwest, the largest tributary of the Maritsa that belongs to the Aegean Sea drainage. The river has predominantly rain feed with high water in February–March and low water in August–September.

The Chukarska reka flows entirely in Burgas Province in the municipalities of Aytos, Kameno and Burgas. There are three villages along its course, Chukarka, Vratitsa and Ravnets. Its waters are utilised for irrigation.
