= Hadzhiyska reka =

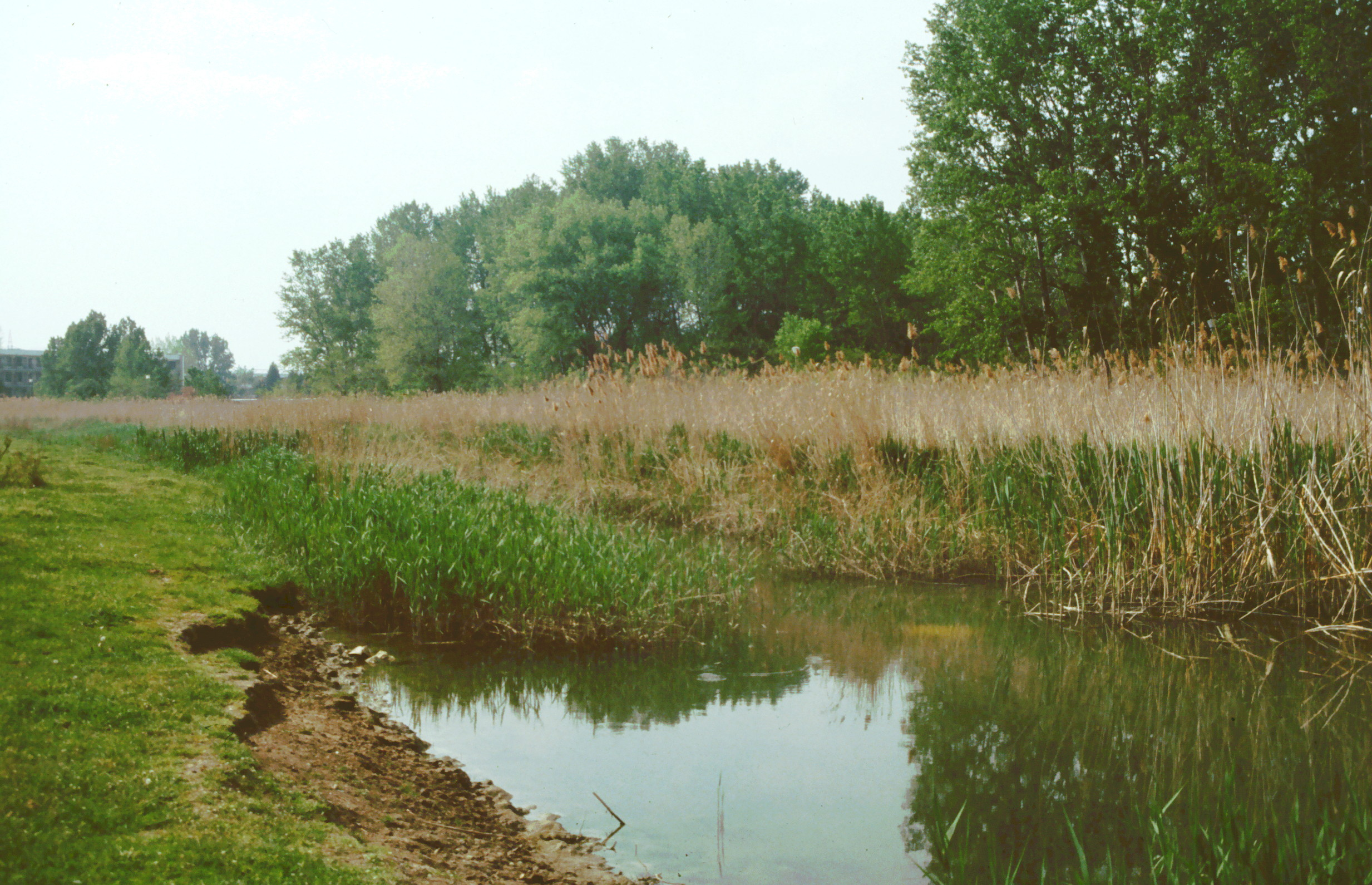

Location
- Country: Bulgaria

Physical characteristics
- Source
  - location: Eminska Planina, Balkan Mountains
  - coordinates: 42°49′17″N 27°18′42″E
  - elevation: 482 m (1,581 ft)
- Mouth
  - location: Black Sea at Sunny Beach
  - coordinates: 42°40′35″N 27°42′44″E
  - elevation: 0 m (0 ft)
- Length: 55 km (34 mi)
- Basin size: 356 km^{2} (137 sq mi)

The Hadzhiyska reka (Bulgarian: Хаджийска река) is a 55 km long river in eastern Bulgaria that flows into the Black Sea.

The river takes its source in the western part of the Eminska Planina division of the eastern Balkan Mountains at an altitude of 482 m, about two kilometers south of the village of Dobra Polyana. In its first four kilometers the Hadzhiyska reka flows southwards and then turns east in a wide valley between the Eminska Planina to the north and the Aytoska Planina to the south. Downstream of the village of Galabets its turns southeast, passes through the Poroy Reservoir and flows into the Nesabar Bay of the Black Sea in the southern part of Sunny Beach, the largest seaside resort in Bulgaria, and north of the town of Nesebar.

Its drainage basin covers a territory of 356 km^{2}. To the north its basin follows the ridge of the Eminska Planina, which separates it from the basin of the river Dvoynitsa. To the south the ridge of the Aytoska Planina forms the boundary with the drainage systems of the Aheloy. The river has predominantly rain feed with high water in February–March and low water in August–September. The average annual flow near the village of Galabets is 0.64 m^{3}/s.

The Hadzhiyska reka flows entirely in Burgas Province. There are four villages along its course, Preobrazhentsi and Razhitsa in Ruen Municipality and Stratsin and Galabets in Pomorie Municipality. Its waters are utilised for irrigation.

== Gallery ==
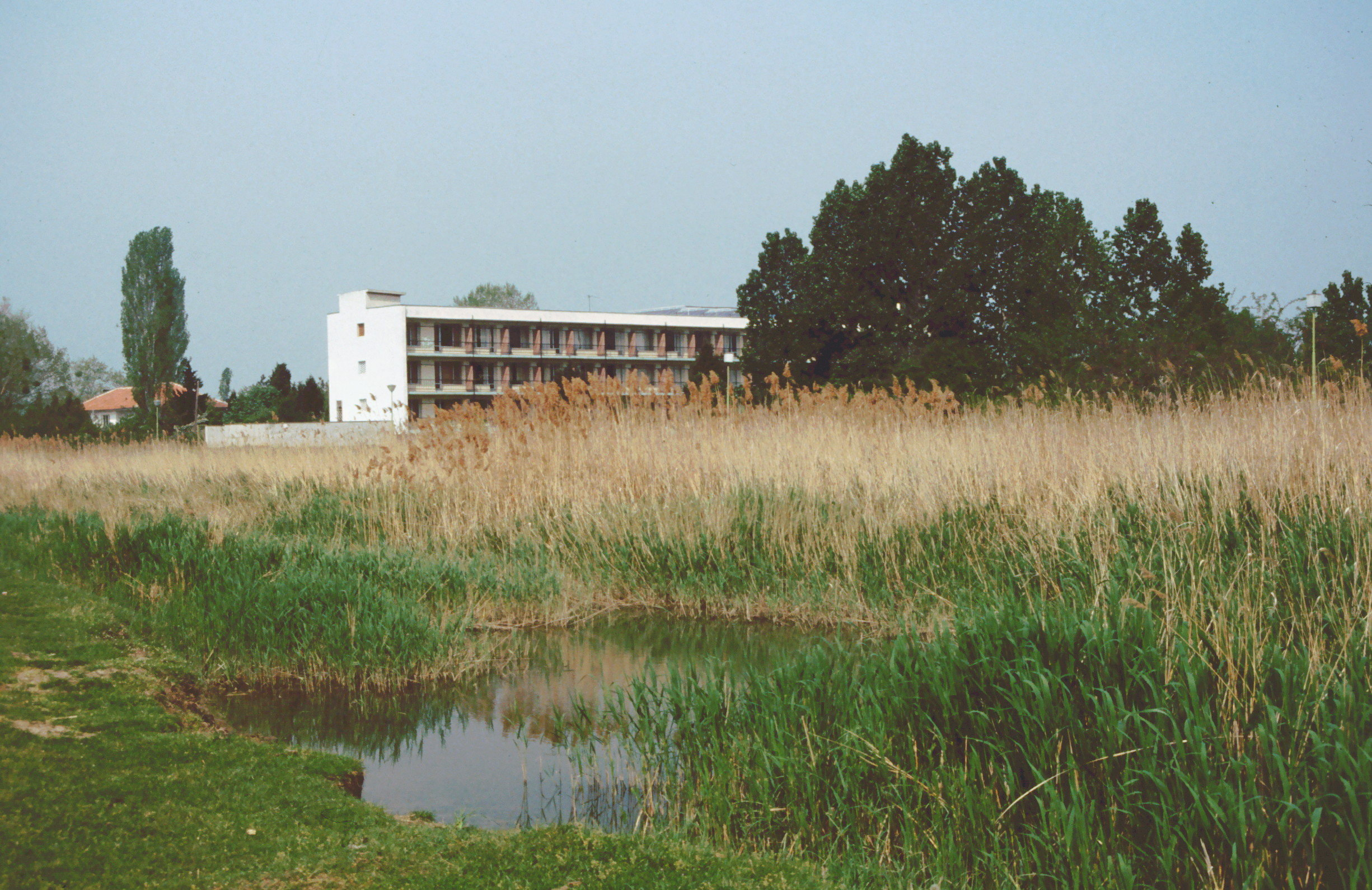
Reeds near Sunny Beach

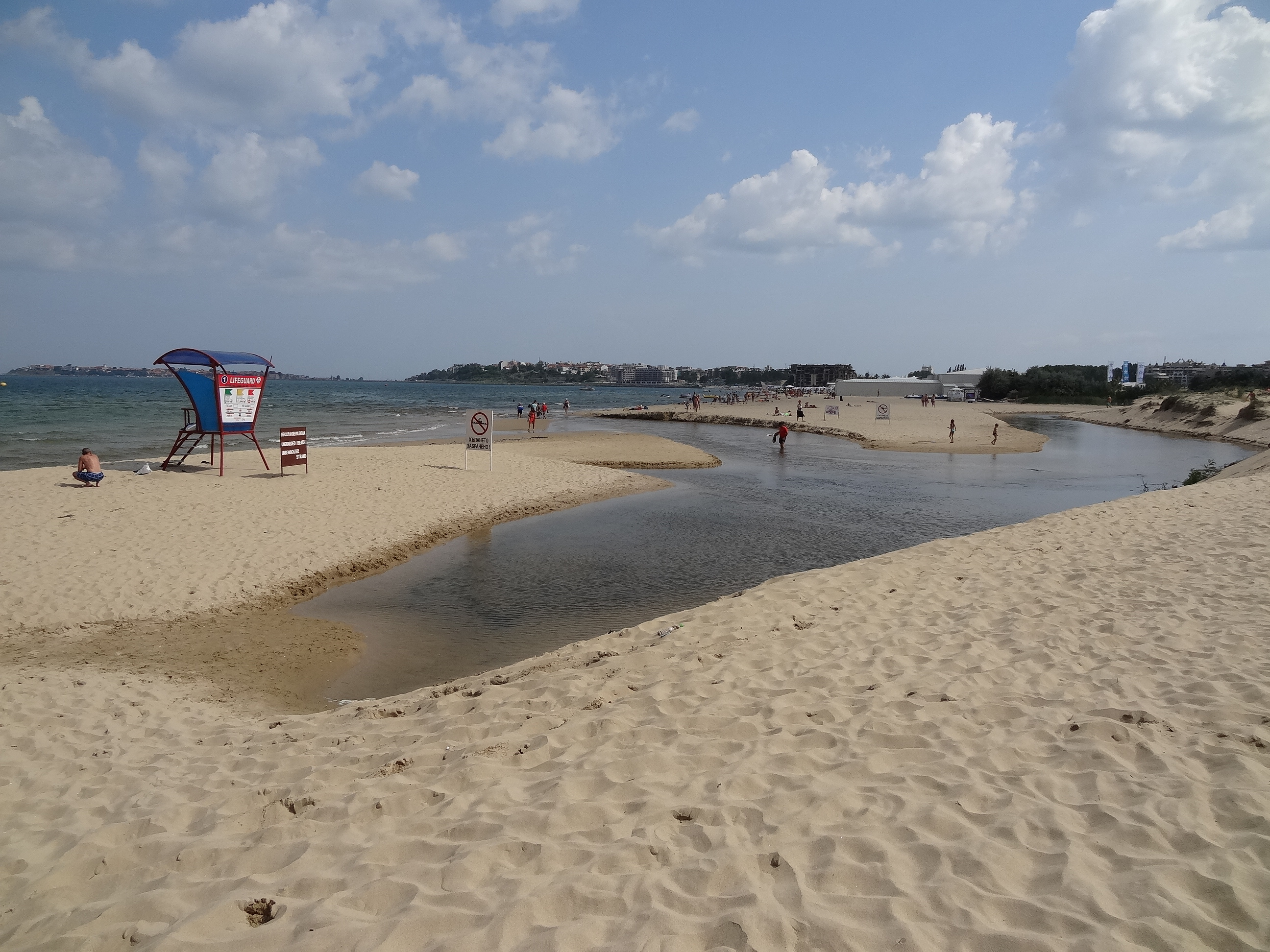
The river mouth

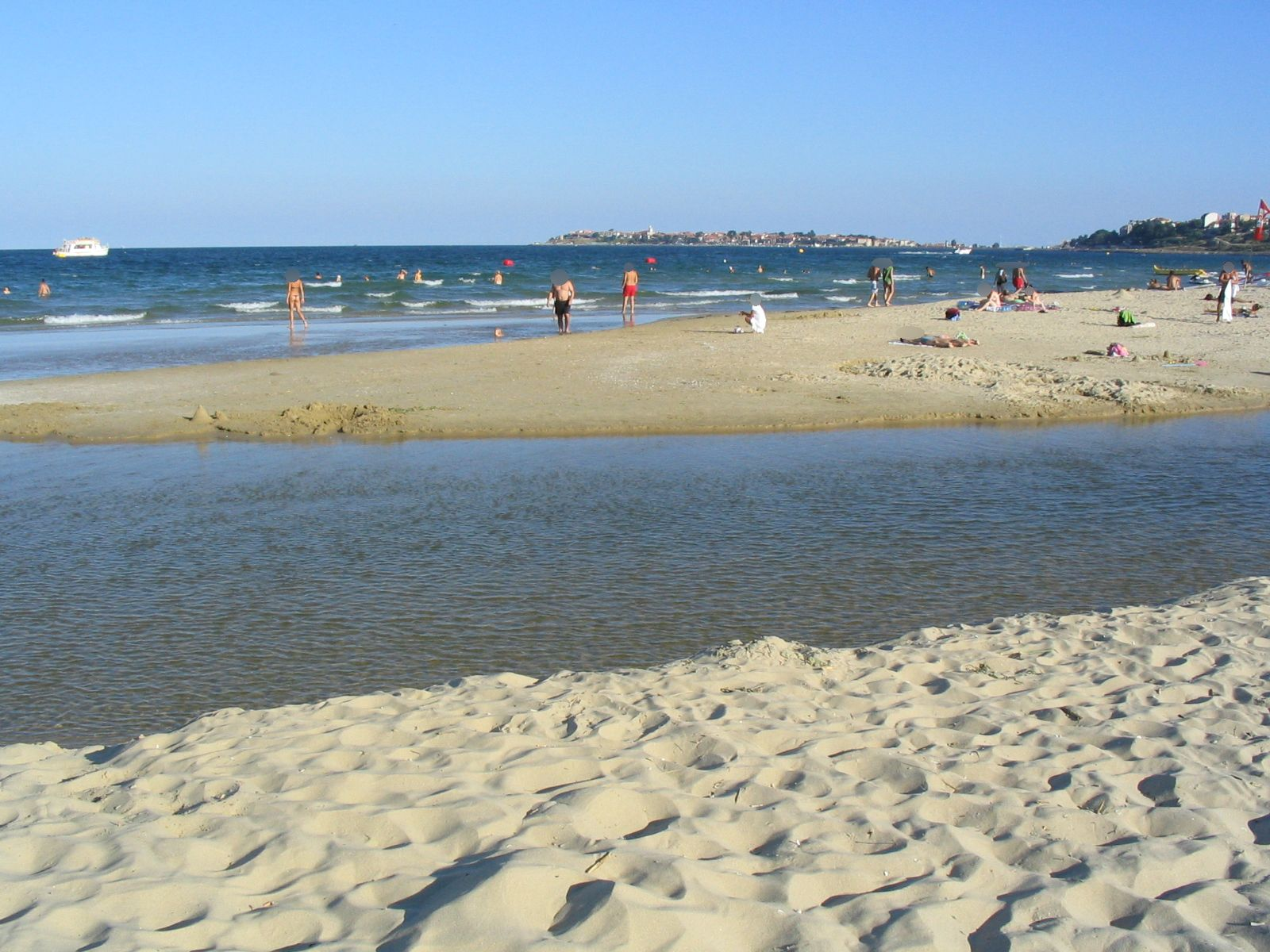
The river mouth with Nesebar
