= Rusokastrenska reka =

Location
- Country: Bulgaria

Physical characteristics
- Source
  - location: Hisar Heights
  - coordinates: 42°37′35.04″N 27°0′24.84″E
  - elevation: 335 m (1,099 ft)
- Mouth
  - location: Lake Mandrensko → Black Sea
  - coordinates: 42°24′10.08″N 27°19′10.92″E
  - elevation: 6 m (20 ft)
- Length: 65 km (40 mi)
- Basin size: 525 km^{2} (203 sq mi)

The Rusokastrenska reka (Bulgarian: Русокастренска река) is a 65 km long river in eastern Bulgaria that flows into Lake Burgas, which drains into the Black Sea. In 1332 near the river's left banks close to the fortress of Rusokastro the Bulgarian emperor Ivan Alexander defeated the Byzantine army under emperor Andronikos III Palaiologos in the battle of Rusokastro.

The river takes its source from a spring on the southern slopes of the Hisar Heights at an altitude of 335 m, some 2.4 km southeast of the town of Karnobat. It flows in southeastern direction through the Burgas Plain in a wide valley covered with farmlands. At the village of Zhelyazovo it bends north to bypass the isolated height of Rusen Kamal (108 m), takes its largest tributary the Hadzhilarska reka, and continues southeast. The Rusokastrenska reka flows into Lake Mandrensko near the village of Konstantinovo. The lake itself drains into the Gulf of Burgas in the Black Sea.

Its drainage basin covers a territory of 525 km^{2}. It borders the basins of the Chukarska reka to the northeast, the Sredetska reka to the south and southwest, both flowing into the Black Sea, and shares a boundary with the river Mochuritsa of the Tundzha basin to the northwest, part of the Maritsa basin that belongs to the Aegean Sea drainage. The river has predominantly rain feed with high water in February–March and low water in August–September.

The Rusokastrenska reka flows entirely in Burgas Province. There are six villages along its course: Dragantsi and Sarnevo in Karnobat Municipality and Zhelyazovo, Rusokastro, Trastikovo and Konstantinovo in Kameno Municipality. Its waters are utilised for irrigation.
