= Barbus bergi =

Conservation status
- Least Concern (IUCN 3.1)

Scientific classification
- Domain: Eukaryota
- Kingdom: Animalia
- Phylum: Chordata
- Class: Actinopterygii
- Order: Cypriniformes
- Family: Cyprinidae
- Subfamily: Barbinae
- Genus: Barbus
- Species: B. bergi

Binomial name
- Barbus bergi Chichkoff, 1935

Species of fish

Barbus bergi, the Bulgarian barbel, is a species of ray-finned fish in the genus Barbus, found in eastern Bulgaria and part of European Turkey. It inhabits the river basins of the central and southern Bulgarian Black Sea Coast, including the rivers Provadiya, Kamchiya, Dvoynitsa, Hadzhiyska reka, Aheloy, Aytoska reka, Chukarska reka, Rusokastrenska reka, Sredetska reka, Fakiyska reka, Izvorska reka, Ropotamo, Dyavolska reka, Karaagach, Veleka and Rezovo.
