= Izvorska reka =

Location
- Country: Bulgaria

Physical characteristics
- Source
  - location: Bosna Ridge, Strandzha
  - coordinates: 42°12′15.12″N 27°22′39″E
  - elevation: 386 m (1,266 ft)
- Mouth
  - location: Lake Mandrensko → Black Sea
  - coordinates: 42°24′2.88″N 27°26′7.08″E
  - elevation: 6 m (20 ft)
- Length: 35 km (22 mi)
- Basin size: 109 km^{2} (42 sq mi)

The Izvorska reka (Bulgarian: Изворска река) is a 35 km long river in eastern Bulgaria that flows into Lake Burgas, which drains into the Black Sea.

The river takes its source under the name Selska reka at an altitude of 386 m in the Bosna Ridge in the northern part of the Strandzha mountain range, some 3.5 km southwest of the village of Indzhe Voivoda. It flows in direction north-northeast in a deep valley, which unlike most others in Strantdzha is not densely forested. Near the village of Krushevets its valley widens and then narrows and deepens again until finally widening downstream from the village of Izvor. The Izvorska reka flows into Lake Mandrensko some 1.8 km southwest of the village of Tvarditsa. The lake itself drains into the Gulf of Burgas in the Black Sea.

Its drainage basin covers a territory of 109 km^{2}. It borders the basins of the Fakiyska reka to the west, the Veleka to the south, and the Ropotamo to the west, all of them flowing into the Black Sea. The river has predominantly rain feed with high water in February–March and low water in August–September.

The Izvorska reka flows entirely in Burgas Province. There are six villages along its course, Indzhe Voivoda, Krushevets and Izvor, all of them in Sozopol Municipality. Its waters are utilised for irrigation.
