= Kamenyak, Burgas Province =

Kamenyak Taslik
- Village
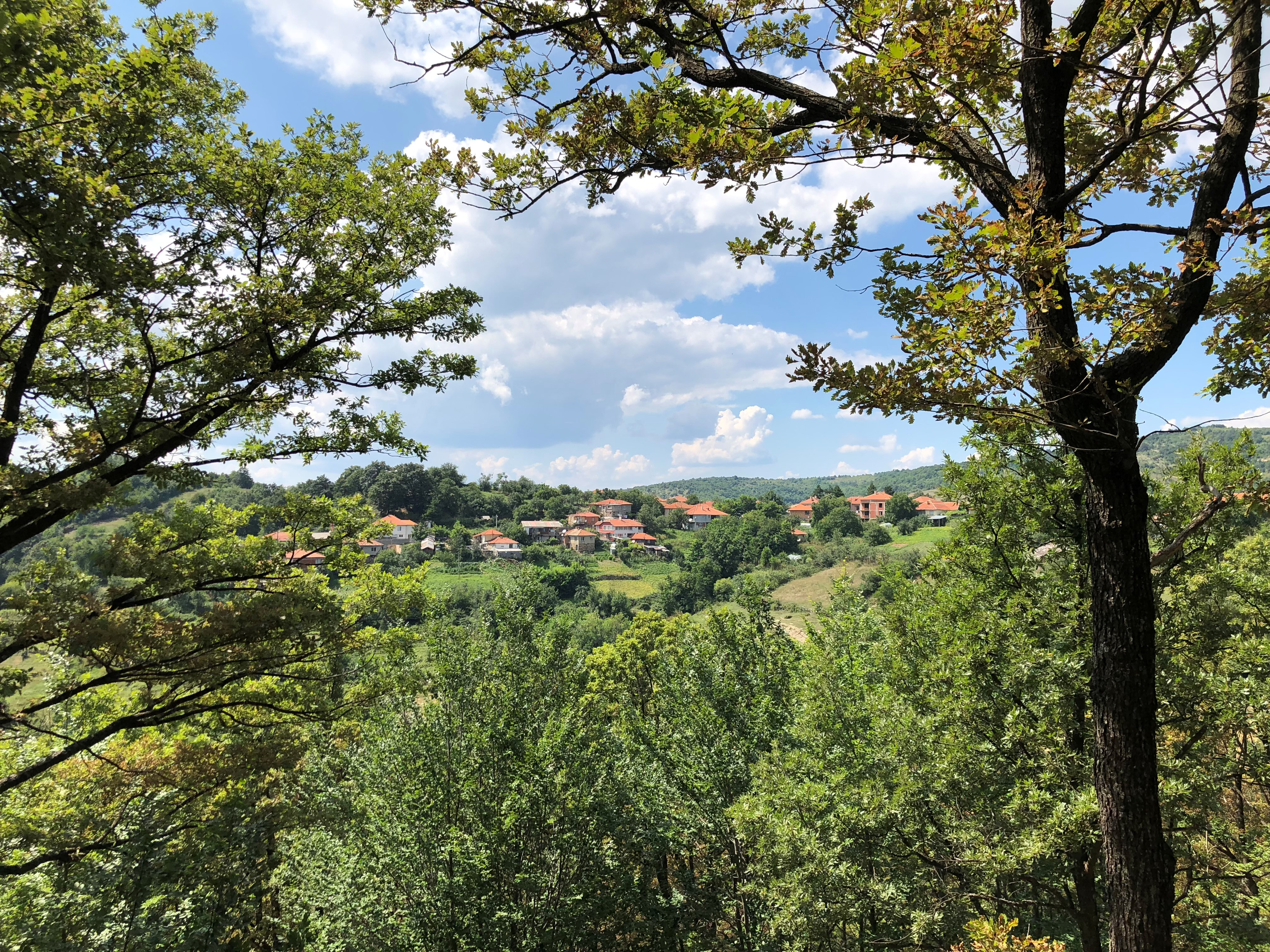
- View of Kamenyak

- Location within Bulgaria
- Coordinates: 42°52′N 27°18′E
- Country: Bulgaria
- Province: Burgas Province
- Municipality: Ruen Municipality

Government
  - Leader: Yusuf Yakub

Area
  - Total: 8,496 km^{2} (3,280 sq mi)
- Elevation: 472 m (1,549 ft)

Population (2020)
  - Total: 177
- Time zone: UTC+2 (EET)
  - Summer (DST): UTC+3 (EEST)

Kamenyak is a village in Ruen Municipality, in Burgas Province, in southeastern Bulgaria.

== Geography ==
The village of Kamenyak is located 7–8 km north of the municipal center, the village of Ruen and about 9 km east of the village of Daskotna. It is located in the Eastern Stara Planina, in the western part of the Eminska Mountain at its connection with the neighboring Kamchiyska Mountain. It is built on the ridge of a small hill with east–west direction. The altitude in its higher eastern part reaches about 500 m, and in the center of the town hall is about 475 m. Municipal roads connect Kamenyak with the neighboring villages: to the south through Dobra Polyana with Ruen, to the north - with Zaimchevo and Snezha.

The population of the village of Kamenyak, numbering 242 people by 1934, after several sharp fluctuations in the number - a maximum of 356 by 1965 - numbers by 2018 (according to current demographic statistics for the population) 179 people.

In the census of 1 February 2011, out of a total of 229 persons, 213 persons were indicated as belonging to a "Turkish" ethnic group and the rest were not answered.

== History ==
After the end of the Russian-Turkish War of 1877–1878, under the Berlin Treaty, the village remained on the territory of Eastern Rumelia. Since 1885 - after the Union, it is located in Bulgaria under the name Tashlik. It was renamed Kamenyak in 1934.

== Religion ==
The religion practiced in the village of Kamenyak is Islam. As of 2021 Kamenyak has a working Mosque.
