= Alburnus mandrensis =

Conservation status
- Endangered (IUCN 3.1)

Scientific classification
- Kingdom: Animalia
- Phylum: Chordata
- Class: Actinopterygii
- Order: Cypriniformes
- Family: Leuciscidae
- Subfamily: Leuciscinae
- Genus: Alburnus
- Species: A. mandrensis

Binomial name
- Alburnus mandrensis (Drensky, 1943)

Species of fish

Alburnus mandrensis, the Mandras bleak, is a species of ray-finned fish in the genus Alburnus. The species is restricted only to the drainage of Lake Mandra in Bulgaria that includes the rivers Izvorska reka, Fakiyska reka, Sredetska reka and Rusokastrenska reka. It is threatened by pollution (domestic and industrial) and the impoundment of spawning streams.
