= Dimchevo =

Village in Burgas, Bulgaria

Dimchevo Димчево
- Village
- Location in Bulgaria
- Country: Bulgaria
- Province: Burgas Province
- Municipality: Burgas Municipality

Area
  - Total: 17 km^{2} (6.6 sq mi)

Population (2022)
  - Total: 228
- Time zone: UTC+2 (EET)
  - Summer (DST): UTC+3 (EEST)

Dimchevo (Bulgarian: Димчево, romanized: Dimčevo) is a village in Burgas Municipality, in Burgas Province, in southeastern Bulgaria.

== Geography ==
Dimchevo is situated around 11 – 12 km southwest of Burgas, on the road to Zidarovo, and 7 km from Marinka. It is in the base of the Strandzha, with a southwest view of Lake Mandrensko. Between the village and the lake is "Lakite" (Bulgarian:„Лъките“) – an exceptionally lush area of predominantly flat terrain, and is the result of the deposition of nearby river Izvorska at its mouth. The area is separated from the rest of the lake by a dyke wall meant to prevent flooding.

== Demographics ==
According to 2011 Bulgarian census, the village had Bulgarian majority.

Ethnicity	People count
Bulgarians	153
Turks	6
Romanians	-
Others	-
Prefer not to answer	-
Not stated	12
Total	174

According to the 2022 census the village has 228 people.

== History ==
Poda is situated south of downtown Burgas, where Lake Mandrensko flows into the Gulf of Burgas. A tower once stood there, according to medieval sources from the XIV century. Its purpose was to serve as a lighthouse and to guard the entryway to the medieval city of Skafida, which would eventually become Dimchevo.

The Medieval fort of Skafida housed a harbor, at which during the Middle Ages seafaring ships dock, as the navigable Lake Mandrensko was, even then, connected to the Black Sea via a natural waterway. The fortress was situated on the south shore of Lake Mandrensko, in proximity of the medieval hamlet Skef, which served as a successor to the township of the keep, and was situated about 4 km from where Lake Mandrensko flowed into the sea through a 20 meter wide canal, on a low peninsula, which would later be known as Kaleborun. According to the description of Hermann and Karel Škorpil, the ruins of a fortress, made of brick stone and white mortar, could be found in the area. The fortress wall was around 2.40 m wide and encircled a rectangular patch with sides 80 and 60 m. The Škorpil brothers noticed indications of possible rectangular towers at the edges of the fort, as well as a moat at the narrow of the peninsula in front of the wall. Following the construction of a dam near the outflow of the lake its level rose and fully submerged the peninsula.

The remains of a mighty square tower with wall length of 6 m, once again of brick stone and white mortar, can still be found on the shores of the outflow of the lake. The tower possibly served as a lighthouse meant to guide the ships at night. At the same place the Škorpil brothers noticed the foundations of a relatively large brick stone bridge with length and width respectively 6.10 and 3.80 m. The bridge most likely was vaulted, so ships could pass beneath it. These were destroyed during the construction of the contemporary road in the beginning of the 20th century, the route of which passes merely a few dozen meters from the tower.

Describing the events of the Byzantine–Bulgarian wars, in the spring of 1304, Georgi Pahimer tells that following the flash advance of Tsar Svetoslav, during which the Bulgarians conquer the fortresses lining the South Black Sea coast all the way down to Sozopol, one of the Byzantine armies, headed by Michael Doukas Glabas Tarchaneiotes and despot Voisil, brother of Tsar Smilets of Bulgaria, commenced a counter-advance from the Byzantine city of Vize. Retreating from the Strandzha mountain, with the aim to regroup, Svetoslav fought a decisive battle at river Skafida (see Battle of Skafida). According to Pahimer's account of the battle, the bridge collapsed while the Byzantines tried to cross with no order whatsoever and thus the victory was secured for the Bulgarians. Taking into account the structural durability of the bridge, historians agree that its collapse was most likely planned and executed by the Bulgarians, led by Tsar Theodore Svetoslav.

The last account of Skafida is in the Chronicle of Savoy, compiled from 1464 through 1465 of works written in the early 15th century, which describes the expeditions of Amadeus VI, Count of Savoy. It describes the count's uneasy siege of the port-town of Skafida, coming from Sozopol, and the destruction of the many Ottoman ships anchored at the docks. The count spent multiple days in the city for his armies to gather their strength, before departing for the fortress of Anchialos. The settlement of Skafida is mentioned once again in the work, in a passage where the Bulgarian prisoners of war taken by the count ask him why he is taking the lands and strongholds, including Skafida, of the Bulgarian Tsar, who has done nothing of ill intent to him. Those two sources show that the settlement was heavily garrisoned and strategically important in its region.

By the late 19th century the village was known by the name Skef. In the 1890s, Bulgarian prime minister Stefan Stambolov held property there and spent some of his time there.

== Cultural and natural landmarks ==
In close proximity to the village, at around 800 m from its center, river Fakia flows into Lake Mandrensko, in a verdant area. The area is a natural reserve. Birds inhabiting the lake can be spotted there using binoculars or telescopes.

From the "Vyatarnitzata" area at the edge of the village a beautiful view of nearby Burgas, Lake Mandrensko, and the Bay of Burgas is revealed.

== Regular events ==
- Village assembly

== Other ==
One of the largest ostrich farms in Southeast Bulgaria is located in Dimchevo. There is a small factory for unusual and avant-garde furniture.

There is a sunflower seed packaging facility in the village.
