= Aytoska reka =

Location
- Country: Bulgaria

Physical characteristics
- Source
  - location: Aytoska Planina, Balkan Mountains
  - coordinates: 42°45′18″N 27°18′11.16″E
  - elevation: 344 m (1,129 ft)
- Mouth
  - location: Lake Burgas → Black Sea
  - coordinates: 42°29′49.92″N 27°20′49.92″E
  - elevation: 1 m (3 ft 3 in)
- Length: 32.5 km (20.2 mi)
- Basin size: 305 km^{2} (118 sq mi)

The Aytoska reka (Bulgarian: Айтоска река) is a 32.5 km long river in eastern Bulgaria that flows into Lake Burgas, which drains into the Black Sea.

The river takes its source in the western part of the Aytoska Planina division of the eastern Balkan Mountains at an altitude of 344 m, some 2.5 km north of the village of Lyaskovo. It flows in direction south–southeast through the Burgas Plain in a wide valley. The Aytoska reka flows into Lake Burgas about 2.4 km southwest of the Dolno Ezerovo neighbourhood of the city of Burgas. The lake itself drains into the Gulf of Burgas in the Black Sea.

Its drainage basin covers a territory of 305 km^{2}. The river has predominantly rain feed with high water in February–March and low water in August–September. The average annual flow near the town of Kameno is 0.60 m^{3}/s.

The Aytoska reka flows entirely in Burgas Province in the municipalities of Aytos, Kameno and Burgas. There are two towns along its course, Aytos and Kameno. Its waters are utilised for irrigation. Along its left banks between Aytos and its mouth passes a section of the Sofia–Burgas railway line served by the Bulgarian State Railways.
