= Yasna polyana =

Yasna polyana Ясна поляна
- Village
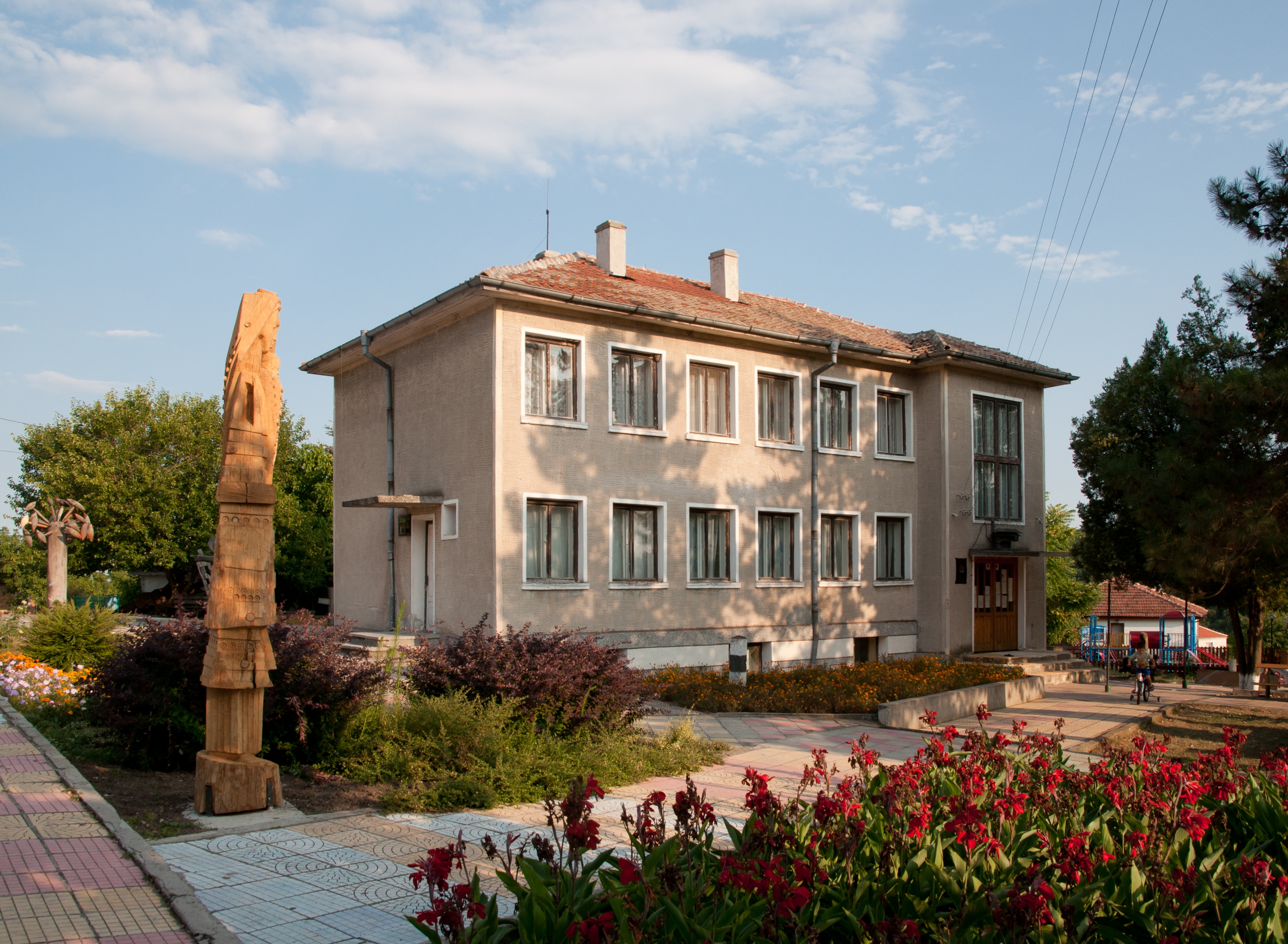
- Yasna Polyana Village Hall.

- Location within Bulgaria
- Coordinates: 42°17′N 27°37′E
- Country: Bulgaria
- Province: Burgas Province
- Municipality: Primorsko Municipality
- Time zone: UTC+2 (EET)
  - Summer (DST): UTC+3 (EEST)

Yasna polyana is a village in Primorsko Municipality, in Burgas Province, in southeastern Bulgaria.
