= Dragovo =

Dragovo (Cyrillic: Драгово) may refer to:

- Dragovo, Bulgaria, a village in Burgas Province, Bulgaria
- Dragovo (Serbia), a village in Serbia
