= Cherna Mogila =

Cherna mogila (Cyrillic: Черна могила) may refer to several places in Bulgaria:

- Cherna Mogila, Burgas Province, a village in Aytos municipality
- Cherna mogila, Haskovo Province, a village in Harmanli municipality
