= Cherkovo, Bulgaria =

Coordinates: 42°29′N 27°02′E

Cherkovo
- Village
- Interactive map of Cherkovo
- Country: Bulgaria
- Province: Burgas Province
- Municipality: Karnobat Municipality
- Time zone: UTC+2 (EET)
  - Summer (DST): UTC+3 (EEST)
- Website: http://www.cherkovo.com

Cherkovo is a village in the Karnobat Municipality in Burgas Province in southeastern Bulgaria.
