= San Stefano (village) =

Coordinates: 42°31′N 26°53′E

- Village
- Interactive map of San Stefano
- Country: Bulgaria
- Province: Burgas Province
- Municipality: Karnobat Municipality
- Time zone: UTC+2 (EET)
  - Summer (DST): UTC+3 (EEST)

San Stefano is a village in Karnobat Municipality, in Burgas Province, in southeastern Bulgaria.

Its name was originally Ismailfak (Исмаилфак).
