= Bryastovets =

Village in Bulgaria

Bryastovets Брястовец
- Village
- Location in Bulgaria
- Coordinates: 42.672°N 27.465°E
- Country: Bulgaria
- Province: Burgas Province
- Municipality: Burgas Municipality

Population (2022)
  - Total: 431
- Time zone: UTC+2 (EET)
  - Summer (DST): UTC+3 (EEST)

Bryastovets (Bulgarian: Брястовец) is a village in Burgas Municipality, in Burgas Province, in southeastern Bulgaria.

== Demographics ==
According to 2011 Bulgarian census, the village had mostly ethnic Bulgarians.

| Ethnicity | People count |
|---|---|
| Bulgarians | 207 |
| Turks | 54 |
| Romanians | - |
| Others | 3 |
| Undefined | 5 |
| Unanswered | 21 |
| Total | 290 |

According to the 2022 census the village has 431 people.

== Landmarks ==
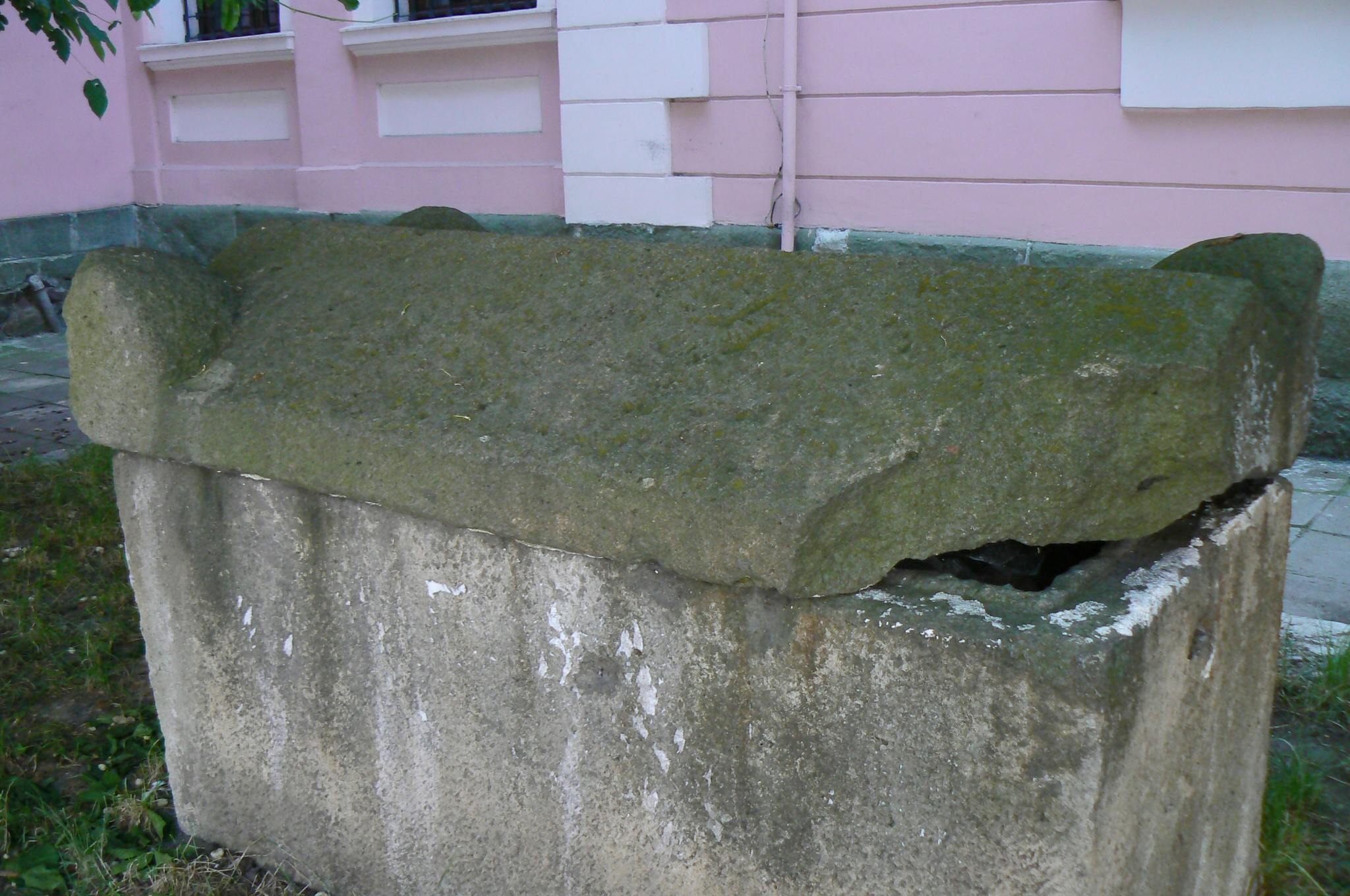
Thracian sarcophagus from village Bryastovets

The village has a church named "St. Athanasius" which was built in 1870.
