= Dobrinovo, Burgas Province =

Coordinates: 42.472°N 26.914°E

Dobrinovo
- Village
- Interactive map of Dobrinovo
- Country: Bulgaria
- Province: Burgas Province
- Municipality: Karnobat Municipality
- Time zone: UTC+2 (EET)
  - Summer (DST): UTC+3 (EEST)

Dobrinovo is a village in Karnobat Municipality, in Burgas Province, in southeastern Bulgaria.
