= Krushovo, Burgas Province =

Coordinates: 42.9167°N 27.1167°E

Krushovo
- Village
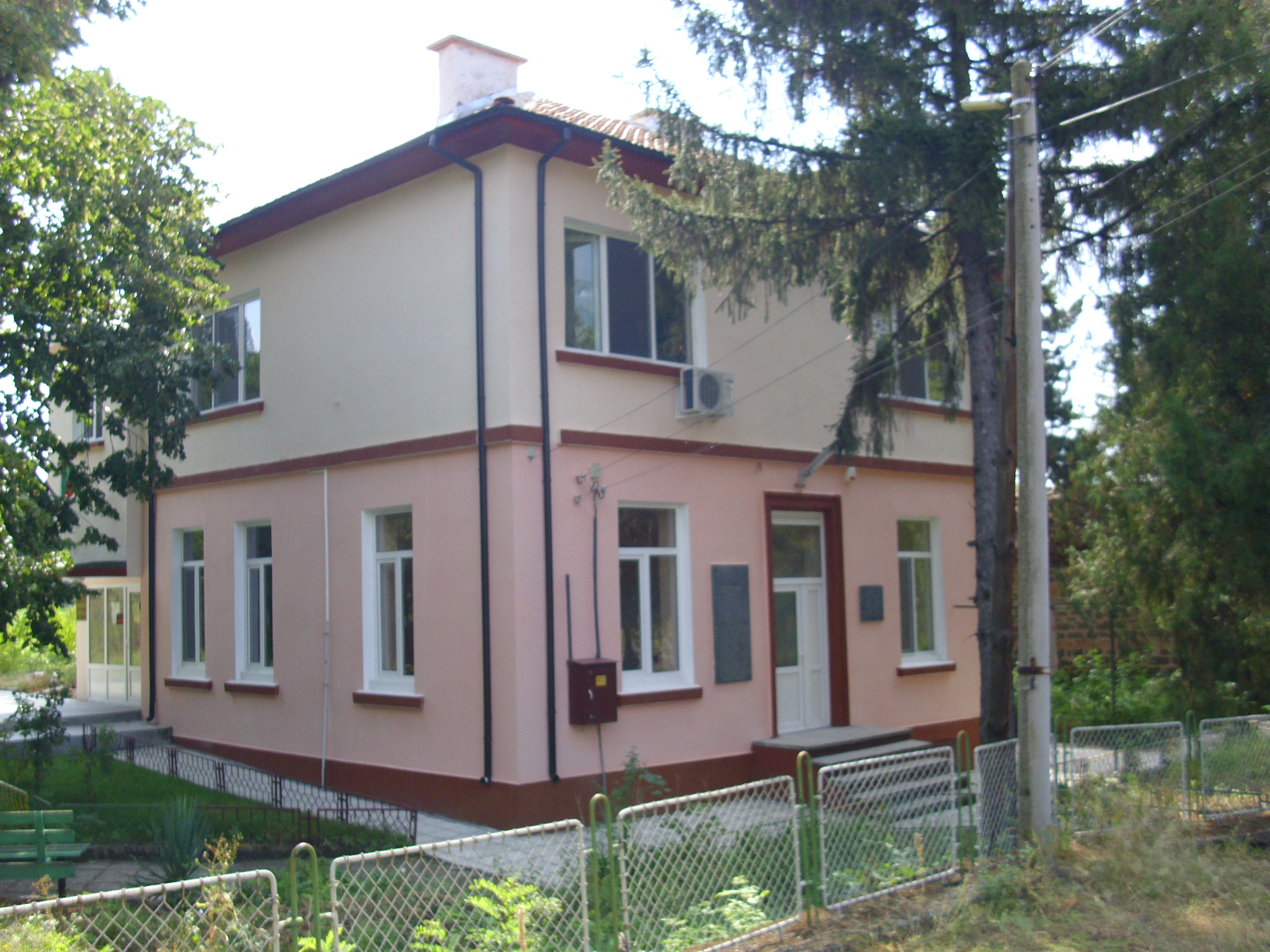
- Interactive map of Krushovo
- Country: Bulgaria
- Province: Burgas Province
- Municipality: Karnobat Municipality
- Time zone: UTC+2 (EET)
  - Summer (DST): UTC+3 (EEST)

Krushovo is a village in Karnobat Municipality, in Burgas Province, in southeastern Bulgaria.
