= Izvorishte =

Village in Burgas, Bulgaria

Izvorishte Изворище
- Village
- Location within Bulgaria
- Coordinates: 42°39′N 27°27′E
- Country: Bulgaria
- Province: Burgas Province
- Municipality: Burgas Municipality

Population (2022)
  - Total: 439
- Time zone: UTC+2 (EET)
  - Summer (DST): UTC+3 (EEST)

Izvorishte (Bulgarian: Изворище) is a village in Burgas Municipality, in Burgas Province, in southeastern Bulgaria.

As of 2022, the village had 439 inhabitants.
