= Venets, Burgas Province =

Coordinates: 42°38′N 26°48′E

Venets Венец
- Village
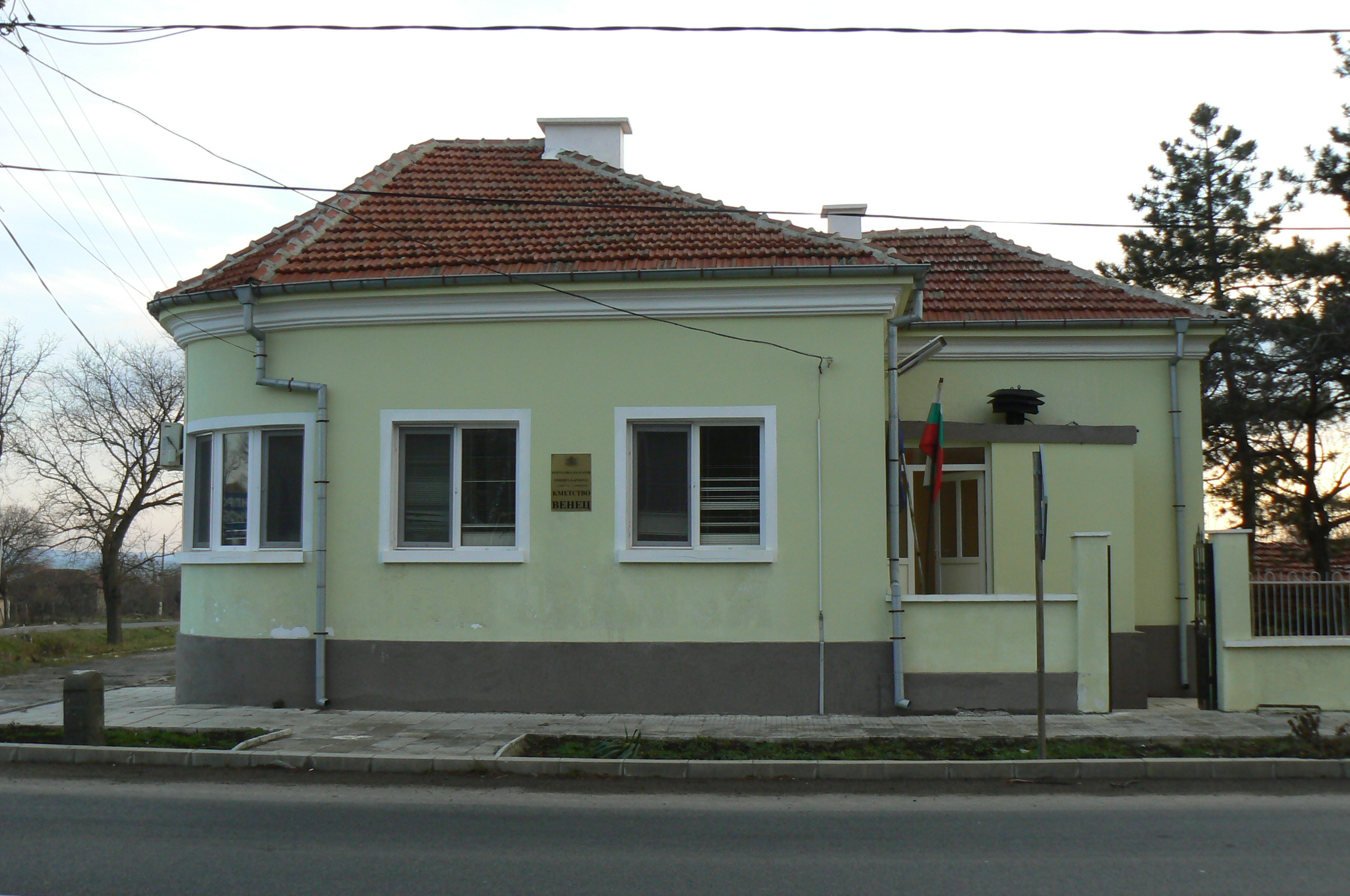
- Village hall
- Interactive map of Venets
- Country: Bulgaria
- Province: Burgas Province
- Municipality: Karnobat Municipality
- Time zone: UTC+2 (EET)
  - Summer (DST): UTC+3 (EEST)

Venets is a village in Karnobat Municipality, in Burgas Province, in southeastern Bulgaria.
