= Galabets, Burgas Province =

Village in Bulgaria

Coordinates: 42°46′14″N 27°31′43″E

Galabets (Bulgarian: Гълъбец) is a village in Pomorie Municipality, Burgas Province, Bulgaria. The nearest airport is Burgas Airport. Galabets is 20 km from the largest Bulgarian sea side town of Sunny Beach with over 6 km of sandy beach. Local villages near Galabets are Goritsa, Poroy, Alexandrovo and Tankovo.
