= Razhitsa =

- Village
- Location within Bulgaria
- Coordinates: 42°47′N 27°24′E
- Country: Bulgaria
- Province: Burgas Province
- Municipality: Ruen Municipality
- Time zone: UTC+2 (EET)
  - Summer (DST): UTC+3 (EEST)

Razhitsa (Bulgarian: Ръжица [ˈrɤʒit͡sɐ]) is a village in Ruen Municipality, in Burgas Province, in southeastern Bulgaria.
