= Trastikovo, Burgas Province =

Trastikovo
- Village
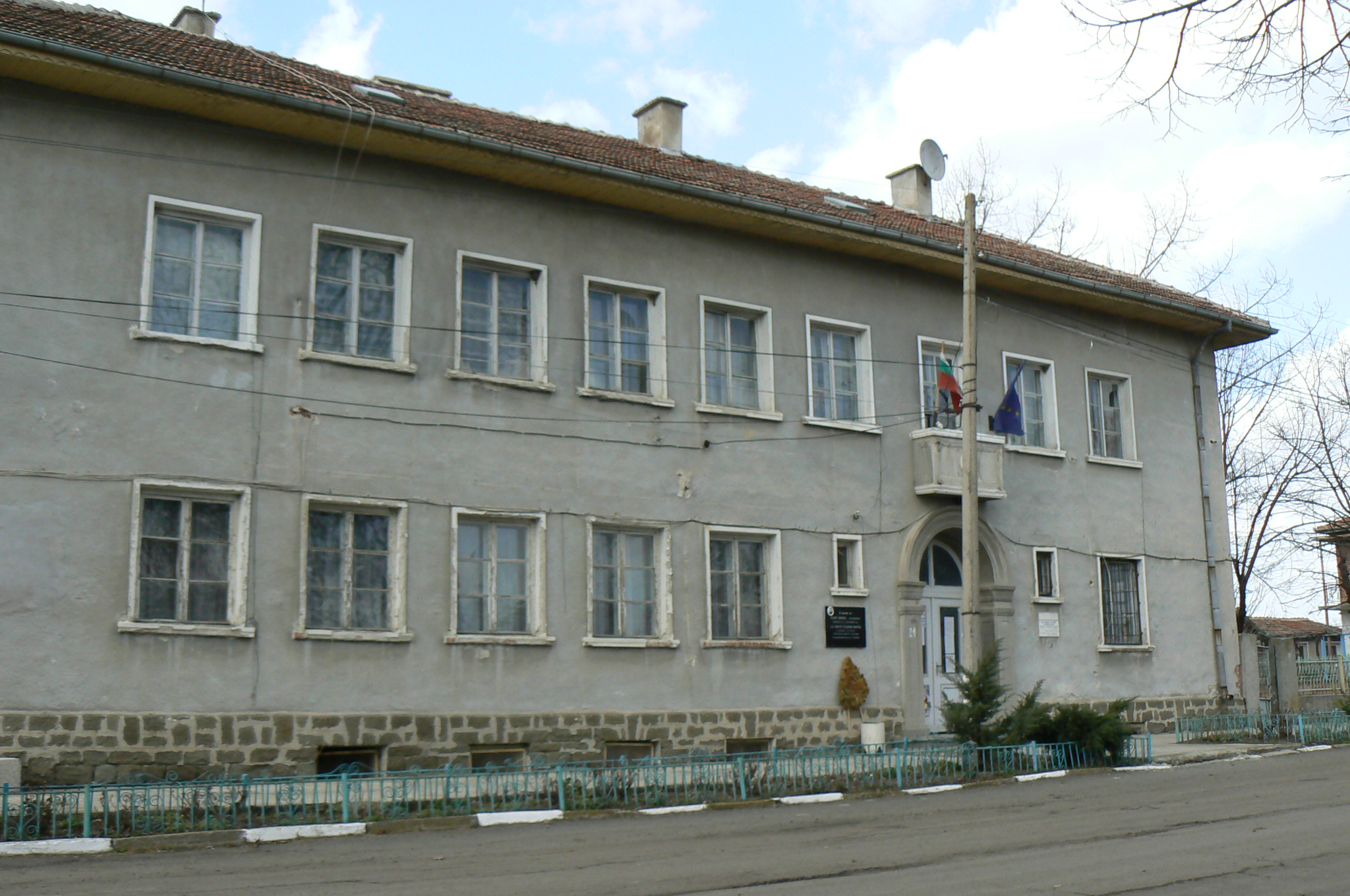
- Village hall

- Location in Bulgaria
- Coordinates: 42°25′45″N 27°15′50″E
- Country: Bulgaria
- Province: Burgas Province
- Municipality: Kameno Municipality
- Time zone: UTC+2 (EET)
  - Summer (DST): UTC+3 (EEST)

Trastikovo is a village in Kameno Municipality, in Burgas Province, in southeastern Bulgaria.
