= Pirne =

- Village
- Location within Bulgaria
- Coordinates: 42°41′N 27°12′E
- Country: Bulgaria
- Province: Burgas Province
- Municipality: Aytos Municipality
- Time zone: UTC+2 (EET)
  - Summer (DST): UTC+3 (EEST)

Pirne is a village in Aytos Municipality, in Burgas Province, in southeastern Bulgaria.

Pirne Peak in Antarctica is named after the village.

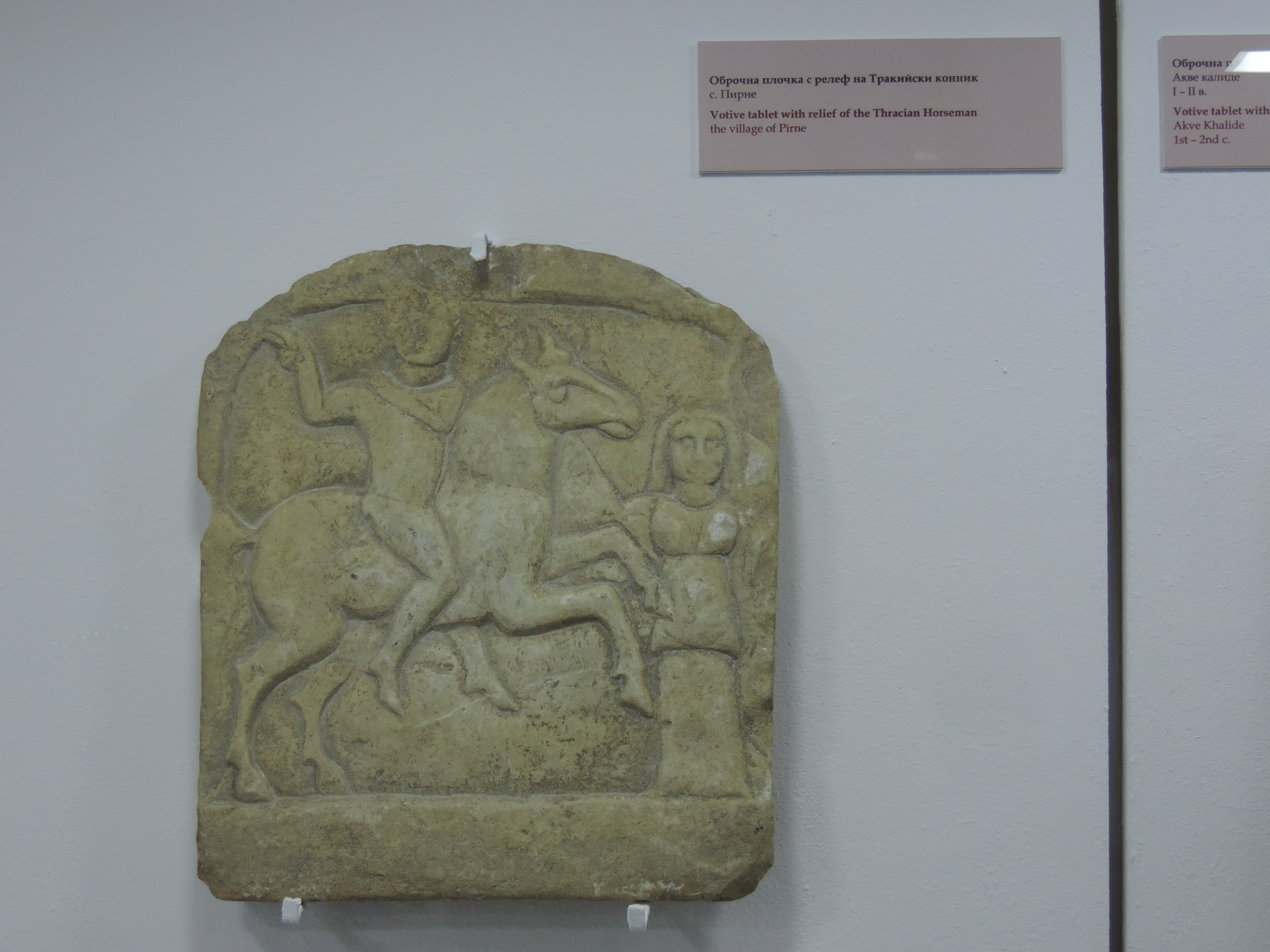
Tablet with the Thracian Horseman, found near Pirne. Exhibit of Burgas Archaeological Museum
