= Gaberovo, Burgas Province =

Gaberovo
- Village
- Location in Bulgaria
- Coordinates: 42.696°N 27.527°E
- Country: Bulgaria
- Province: Burgas Province
- Municipality: Pomorie
- Time zone: UTC+2 (EET)
  - Summer (DST): UTC+3 (EEST)

Gaberovo is a village in the municipality of Pomorie, in Burgas Province, in southeastern Bulgaria.
