= Cherna Mogila, Burgas Province =

Cherna Mogila
- Village
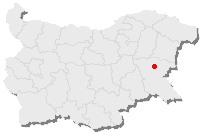

- Location within Bulgaria
- Coordinates: 43°15′N 27°04′E
- Country: Bulgaria
- Province: Burgas Province
- Municipality: Aytos Municipality
- Time zone: UTC+2 (EET)
  - Summer (DST): UTC+3 (EEST)

Cherna Mogila is a village in Aytos Municipality, in Burgas Province, in southeastern Bulgaria.
