= Poroy, Burgas Province =

Poroy
- Village
- Location in Bulgaria
- Coordinates: 42°45′N 27°33′E
- Country: Bulgaria
- Province: Burgas Province
- Municipality: Pomorie
- Time zone: UTC+2 (EET)
  - Summer (DST): UTC+3 (EEST)

Poroy is a village in the municipality of Pomorie, in Burgas Province, in southeastern Bulgaria.
