= Ravnets, Burgas Province =

Village in Burgas, Bulgaria

Ravnets Равнец
- Village
- Location in Bulgaria
- Coordinates: 42°31′1″N 27°15′0″E
- Country: Bulgaria
- Province: Burgas Province
- Municipality: Burgas Municipality

Population (2022)
  - Total: 1,650
- Time zone: UTC+2 (EET)
  - Summer (DST): UTC+3 (+3)

Ravnets (Bulgarian: Равнец, also transcribed at Ravnetz or Ravnec) is a village in Burgas Municipality in southeastern Bulgaria. According to the 2022 census the village has 1650 people.
