= Sarnevo, Burgas Province =

Coordinates: 42°21′N 25°50′E

Sarnevo
- Village
- Interactive map of Sarnevo
- Country: Bulgaria
- Province: Burgas Province
- Municipality: Karnobat Municipality
- Time zone: UTC+2 (EET)
  - Summer (DST): UTC+3 (EEST)

Sarnevo is a village in Karnobat Municipality, in Burgas Province, in southeastern Bulgaria.
