= Lyaskovo, Burgas Province =

Lyaskovo
- Village
- Location within Bulgaria
- Coordinates: 42°43′44″N 27°17′19″E
- Country: Bulgaria
- Province: Burgas Province
- Municipality: Aytos Municipality
- Time zone: UTC+2 (EET)
  - Summer (DST): UTC+3 (EEST)

Lyaskovo is a village in Aytos Municipality, in Burgas Province, in southeastern Bulgaria.
