= Izvor, Burgas Province =

Village in Burgas, Bulgaria

Izvor Извор
- Village
- Location within Bulgaria
- Coordinates: 42°21′N 27°27′E
- Country: Bulgaria
- Province: Burgas Province
- Municipality: Burgas Municipality

Population (2022)
  - Total: 605
- Time zone: UTC+2 (EET)
  - Summer (DST): UTC+3 (EEST)

Izvor (Bulgarian: Извор) is a village in Burgas Municipality, in Burgas Province, in southeastern Bulgaria. It is known for the long stay of Bulgarian revolutionary Vasil Levski during the preparation of an uprising against the Ottoman Empire.

After a referendum in 2011 Izvor became part of Burgas Municipality.

== Demographics ==
According to the 2011 census, the village has 541 inhabitants, down from 1,544 in 1946. Nearly all inhabitants are ethnic Bulgarians. There are also a few Roma people living in the village of Izvor.

As of 2022 census, the village has 605 inhabitants.
