= Kozare, Bulgaria =

Coordinates: 42°37′N 27°03′E

Kozare
- Village
- Interactive map of Kozare
- Country: Bulgaria
- Province: Burgas Province
- Municipality: Karnobat Municipality
- Time zone: UTC+2 (EET)
  - Summer (DST): UTC+3 (EEST)

Kozare is a village in Karnobat Municipality, in Burgas Province, in southeastern Bulgaria.
