= Daskotna =

- Village
- Location within Bulgaria
- Coordinates: 42°53′N 27°12′E
- Country: Bulgaria
- Province: Burgas Province
- Municipality: Ruen Municipality
- Time zone: UTC+2 (EET)
  - Summer (DST): UTC+3 (EEST)

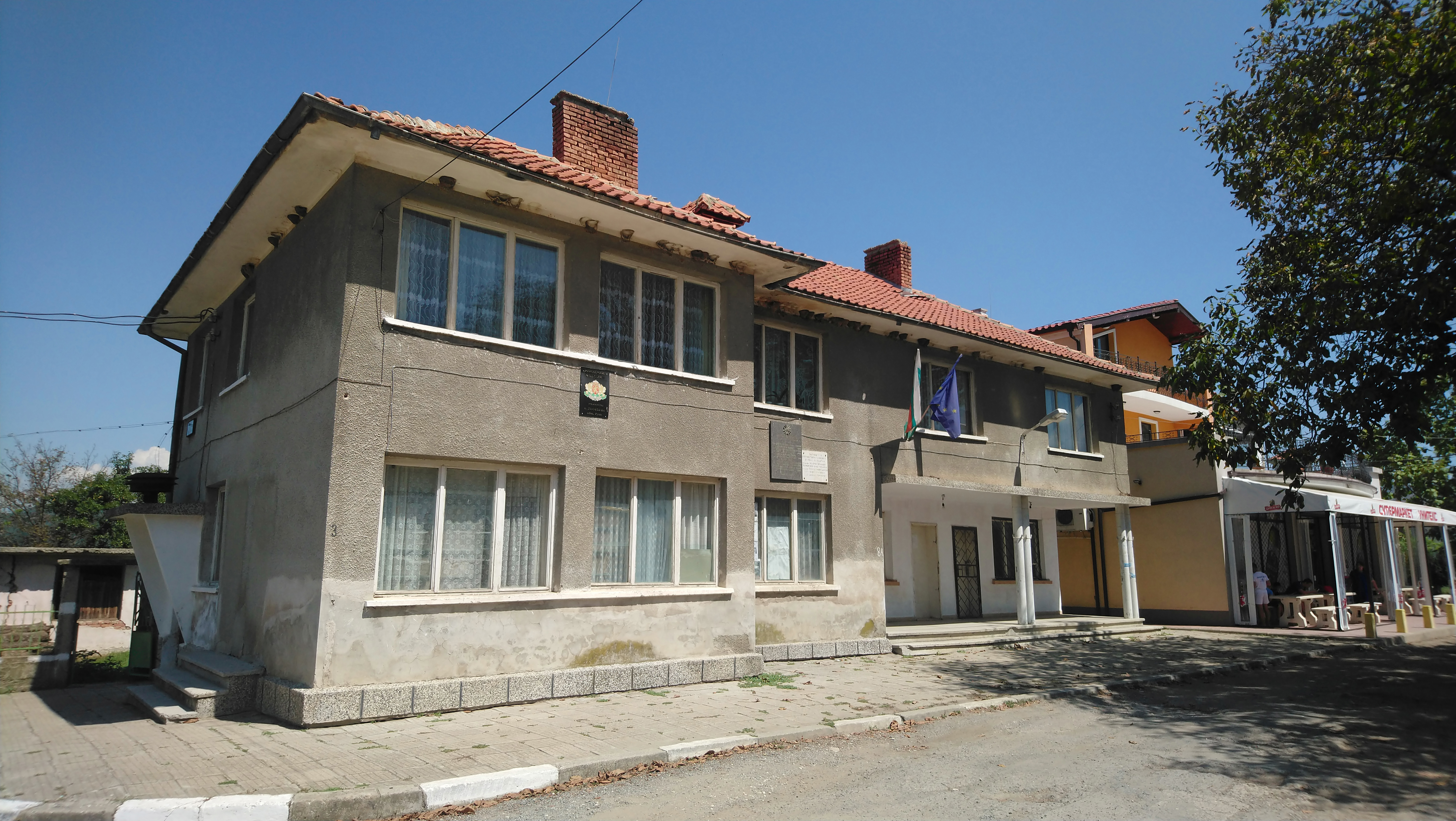
Mayor's office, Daskotna

Daskotna is a village in Ruen Municipality, in Burgas Province, in southeastern Bulgaria. It has a train station on the Sindel (village) -Karnobat railway, linking it with the towns of Varna, Karnobat and Plovdiv.
