= Kosovets, Bulgaria =

- Village
- Location within Bulgaria
- Coordinates: 42°45′19″N 27°26′19″E
- Country: Bulgaria
- Province: Burgas Province
- Municipality: Pomorie
- Time zone: UTC+2 (EET)
  - Summer (DST): UTC+3 (EEST)

Kosovets, Bulgaria is a village in the municipality of Pomorie, in Burgas Province, in the southeastern part of Bulgaria.
