= Tvarditsa, Burgas Province =

Tvarditsa Твърдица
- Village
- Location in Bulgaria
- Coordinates: 42°24′35″N 27°27′30″E
- Country: Bulgaria
- Province: Burgas Province
- Municipality: Burgas Municipality

Population (2022)
  - Total: 496
- Time zone: UTC+2 (EET)
  - Summer (DST): UTC+3 (EEST)

Tvarditsa (Bulgarian: Твърдица) is a village in Burgas Municipality in southeastern Bulgaria.

According to the 2022 census the village has 496 people.
