= Dragovo, Bulgaria =

Coordinates: 42°38′N 27°06′E

Dragovo Село Драгово
- Village
- Interactive map of Dragovo
- Country: Bulgaria
- Province: Burgas Province
- Municipality: Karnobat Municipality

Area
  - Total: 18.147 km^{2} (7.007 sq mi)

Population (2013)
  - Total: 246
- Time zone: UTC+2 (EET)
  - Summer (DST): UTC+3 (EEST)
- Website: www.guide-bulgaria.com/SE/bourgas/karnobat/dragovo

Dragovo is a village in Karnobat Municipality, in Burgas Province, in southeastern Bulgaria.
