= Lake Burgas =

Lake in Burgas, Bulgaria

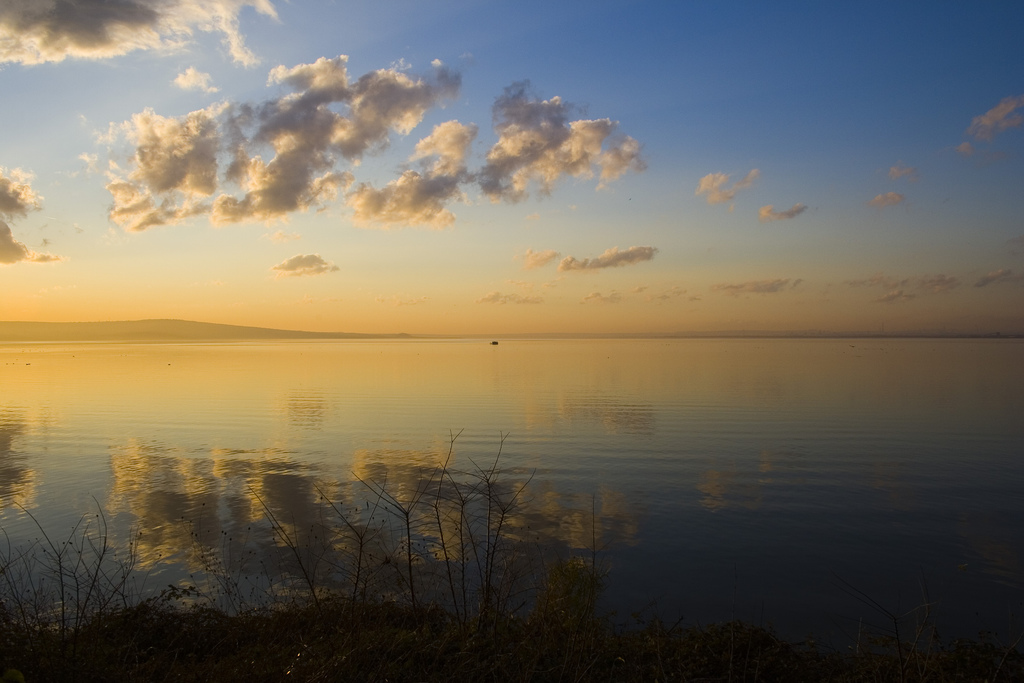

- Location within Bulgaria
- Location: Bulgarian Black Sea Coast
- Group: Burgas Lakes
- Coordinates: 42°30′N 27°24′E
- Type: Brackishwater
- Basin countries: Bulgaria
- Max. length: 9.6 km (6.0 mi)
- Max. width: 5 km (3.1 mi)
- Surface area: 27.60 km^{2} (10.66 sq mi)
- Max. depth: 34 m (112 ft)

Ramsar Wetland
- Official name: Vaya Lake
- Designated: 11 November 2002
- Reference no.: 1230

Lake Burgas (Bulgarian: Бургаско езеро, Burgasko ezero) or Lake Vaya (езеро Вая, ezero Vaya), located near the Black Sea west of the city of Burgas, is the largest natural lake in Bulgaria, with an area of 27.60 km^{2}, a length of 9.6 km and a width of 2.5 to 5 km. It is up to 1.3 m deep.

The lake's waters contain relatively little salt (about 4-11‰). Lake Burgas is inhabited by a wide variety of species, including 23 fish, 60 invertebrates and 254 bird species (of which 61 are endangered in Bulgaria and 9 in the world).

An important fish-producing reservoir in the past, Lake Burgas lost much of its economic importance after the construction of the petrochemical plant near the city, but has witnessed an increasing number of species and decreasing pollution in recent years.

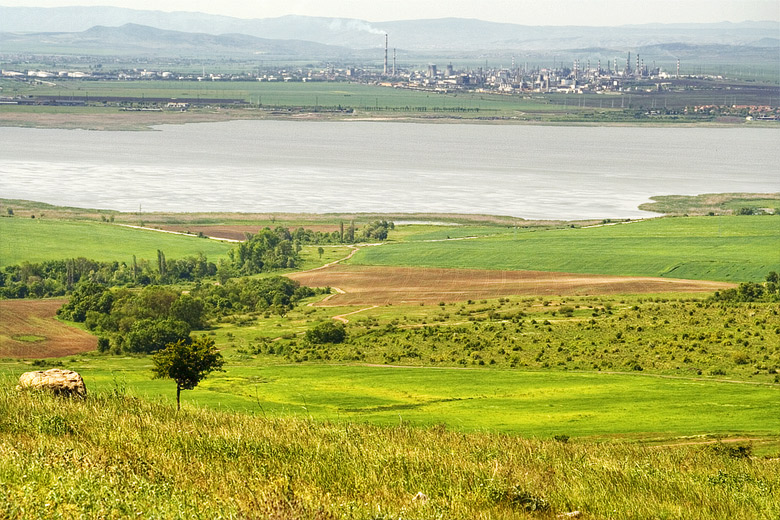
The Neftochim refinery seen from the other shore of the lake
