= Primorsko Municipality =

Coordinates: 42.2699°N 27.7466°E

Primorsko Municipality Община Приморско
- Municipality (Obshtina)
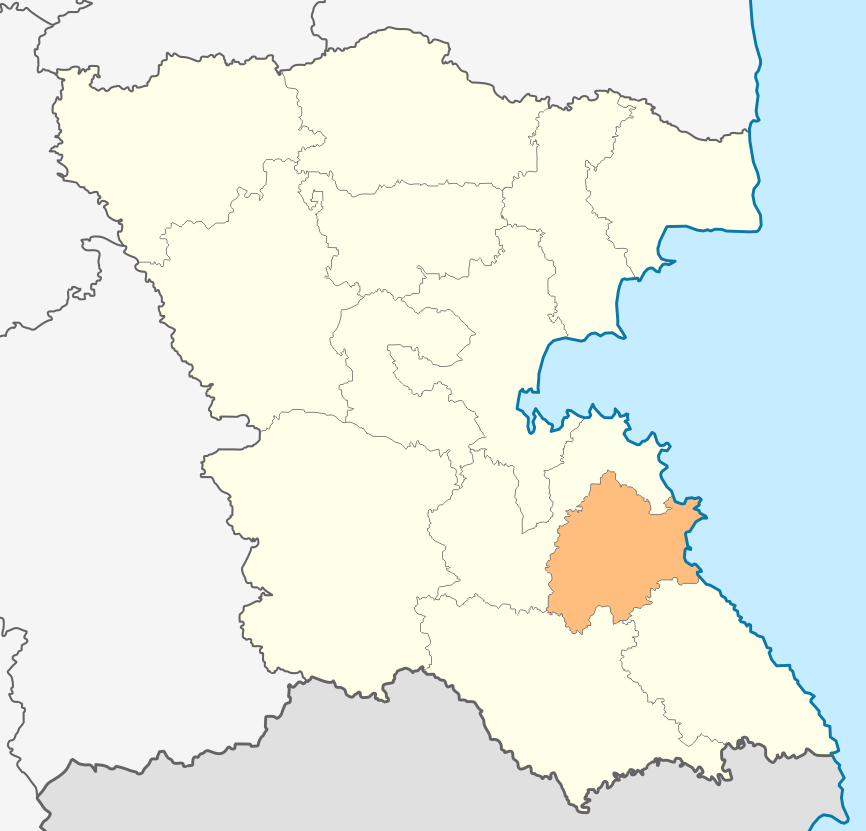
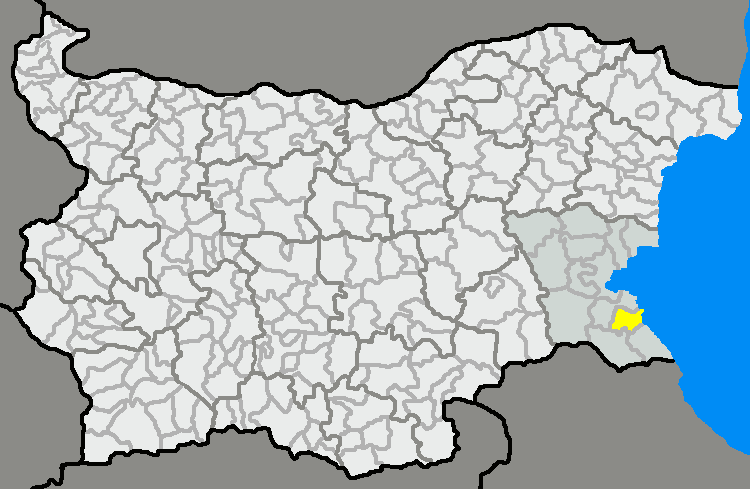
- Location in Burgas province Location on map of Bulgaria
- Country: Bulgaria
- Province (Oblast): Burgas
- Seat: Primorsko

Area
  - Total: 350.08 km^{2} (135.17 sq mi)

Population (2011)
  - Total: 7,526
  - Density: 21.50/km^{2} (55.68/sq mi)
- Time zone: UTC+2 (EET)
  - Summer (DST): UTC+3 (EEST)
- Website: www.primorsko.bg

Primorsko Municipality (Bulgarian: Община Приморско, Obshtina Primorsko) is a municipality in Burgas Province, Bulgaria. It includes the towns of Primorsko and Kiten, as well as a number of villages.

== Demographics ==
=== Religion ===
According to the latest Bulgarian census of 2011, the religious composition, among those who answered the optional question on religious identification, was the following:

Religious composition of Primorsko Municipality
Orthodox Christianity	82.8%
Catholicism	0.5%
Protestantism	3.0%
Islam	3.1%
No religion	4.1%
Prefer not to answer, others and indefinable	6.5%
