= Sozopol Municipality =

Coordinates: 42°17′N 27°26′E

Sozopol Municipality Община Созопол
- Municipality (Obshtina)
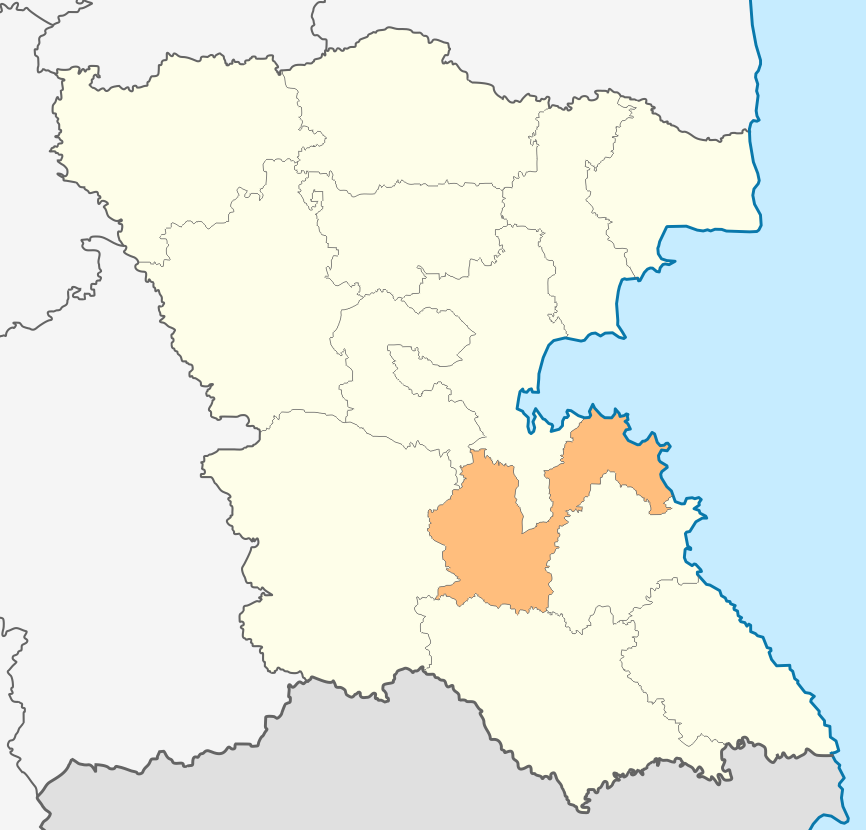
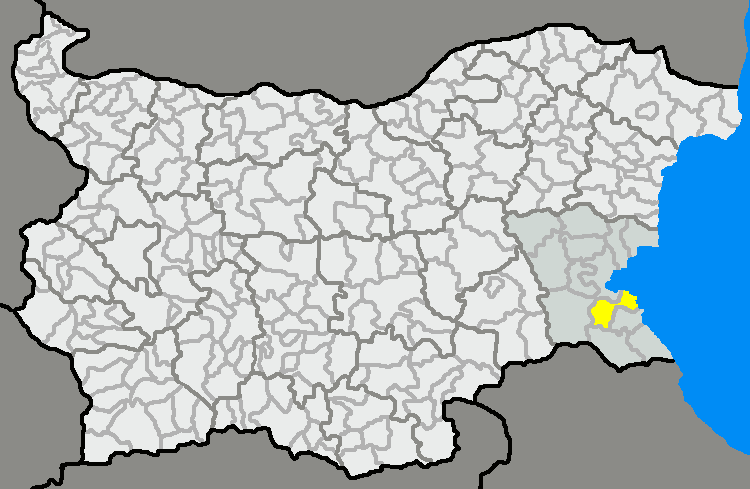
- Location in Burgas province Location on map of Bulgaria
- Country: Bulgaria
- Province (Oblast): Burgas
- Seat: Sozopol

Area
  - Total: 480.07 km^{2} (185.36 sq mi)

Population
  - Total: 14,826
  - Density: 30.883/km^{2} (79.987/sq mi)
- Time zone: UTC+2 (EET)
  - Summer (DST): UTC+3 (EEST)

Sozopol Municipality (Bulgarian: Община Созопол, Obshtina Sozopol) is located in the southern Bulgarian Black Sea Coast and borders Burgas Municipality and Primorsko Municipality. The coast stretches 51 km of which 17.1 km are excellent beaches. There are many small bays and peninsulas as well as several isles. The climate is favourable for growing different crops such as grapes, apples, peaches, cherries, strawberries and others. Sozopol is the biggest fishing port of the country with two major plants processing fish. Tourism is now the most important industry with more than 50,000 beds in the territory of the municipality. As of 2006 the population is 13,401.

== Demographics ==
=== Religion ===
According to the latest Bulgarian census of 2011, the religious composition, among those who answered the optional question on religious identification, was the following:

Religious composition of Sozopol Municipality
Orthodox Christianity	85.9%
Catholicism	0.3%
Protestantism	1.8%
Islam	2.9%
No religion	4.6%
Prefer not to answer, others and indefinable	4.5%
