= Burgas Province =

Province in southeastern Bulgaria

Burgas Province Област Бургас
- Province
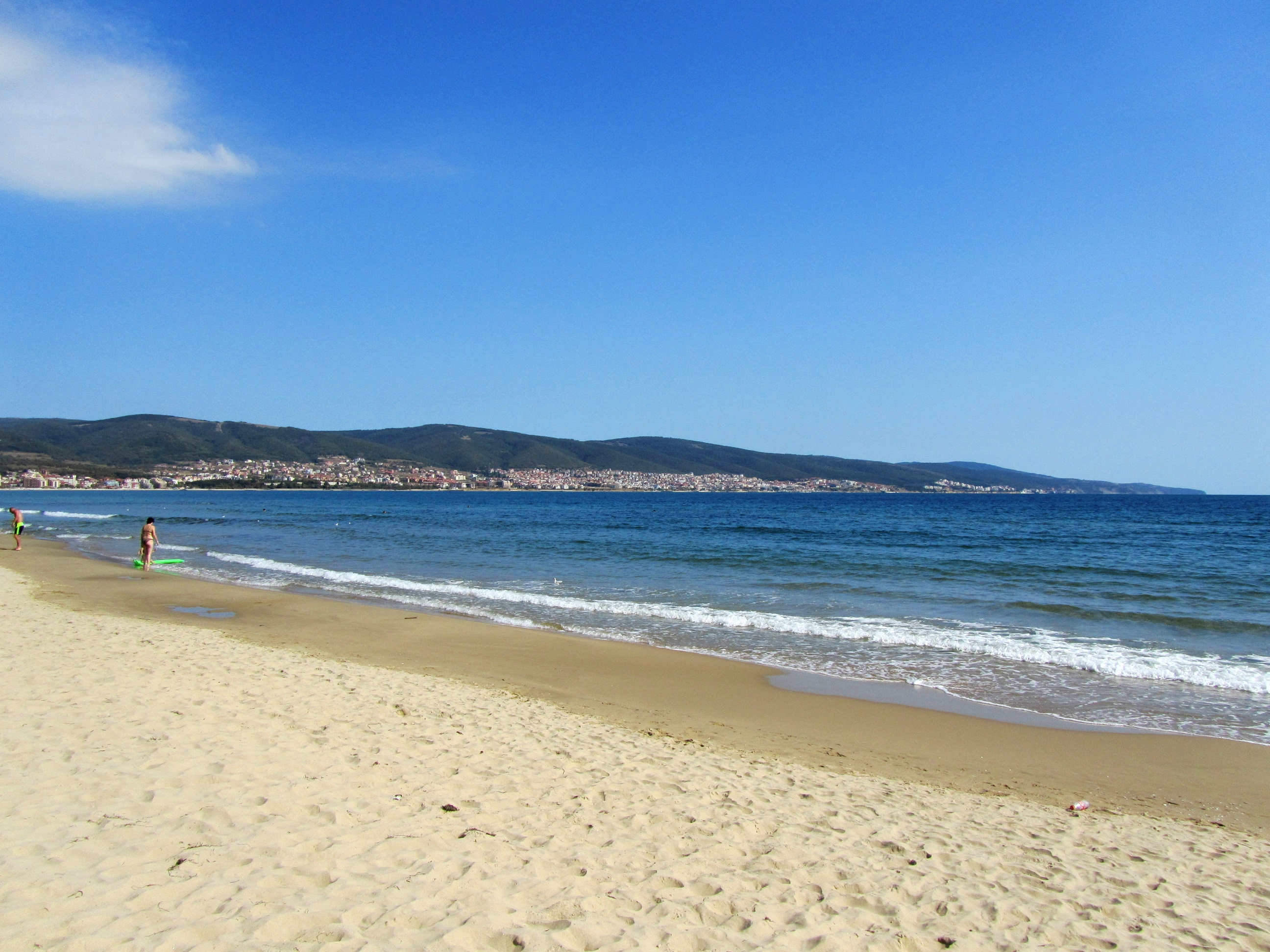
- Sunny Beach

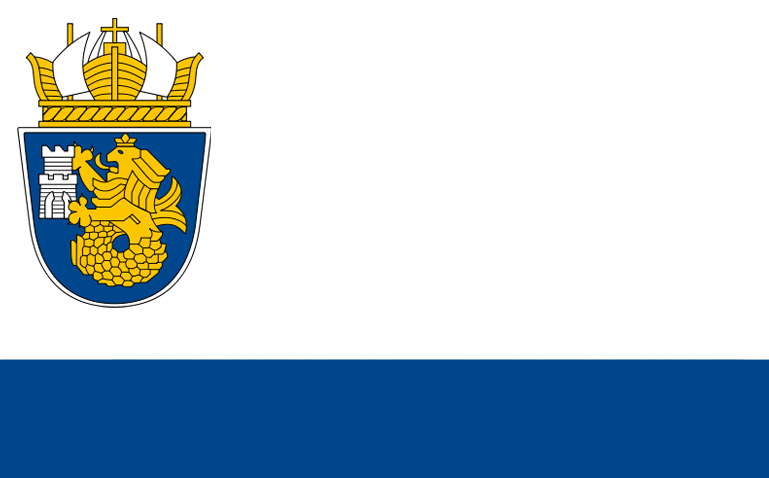
- Flag

- Location of Burgas Province in Bulgaria
- Coordinates: 42°30′N 27°15′E
- Country: Bulgaria
- Capital: Burgas
- Municipalities: 13

Government
  - Governor: Dobromir Gyulev

Area
  - Total: 7,748.07 km^{2} (2,991.55 sq mi)
- Elevation: 84 m (276 ft)

Population (December 2022)
  - Total: 378,596
  - Density: 48.8633/km^{2} (126.555/sq mi)
- Time zone: UTC+2 (EET)
  - Summer (DST): UTC+3 (EEST)
- ISO 3166 code: BG-02
- License plate: A
- Website: www.bsregion.org

Burgas (Bulgarian: Област Бургас, romanized: Oblast Burgas, formerly the Burgas okrug) is a province in southeastern Bulgaria on the southern Bulgarian Black Sea Coast. The province is named after its administrative and industrial centre, the city of Burgas, the fourth biggest town in the country. It is the largest province by area, with a territory of 7,748.1 km^{2} (2,991.6 sq mi) that is divided into 13 municipalities. It has a total population, as of December 2009, of 422,319 inhabitants.

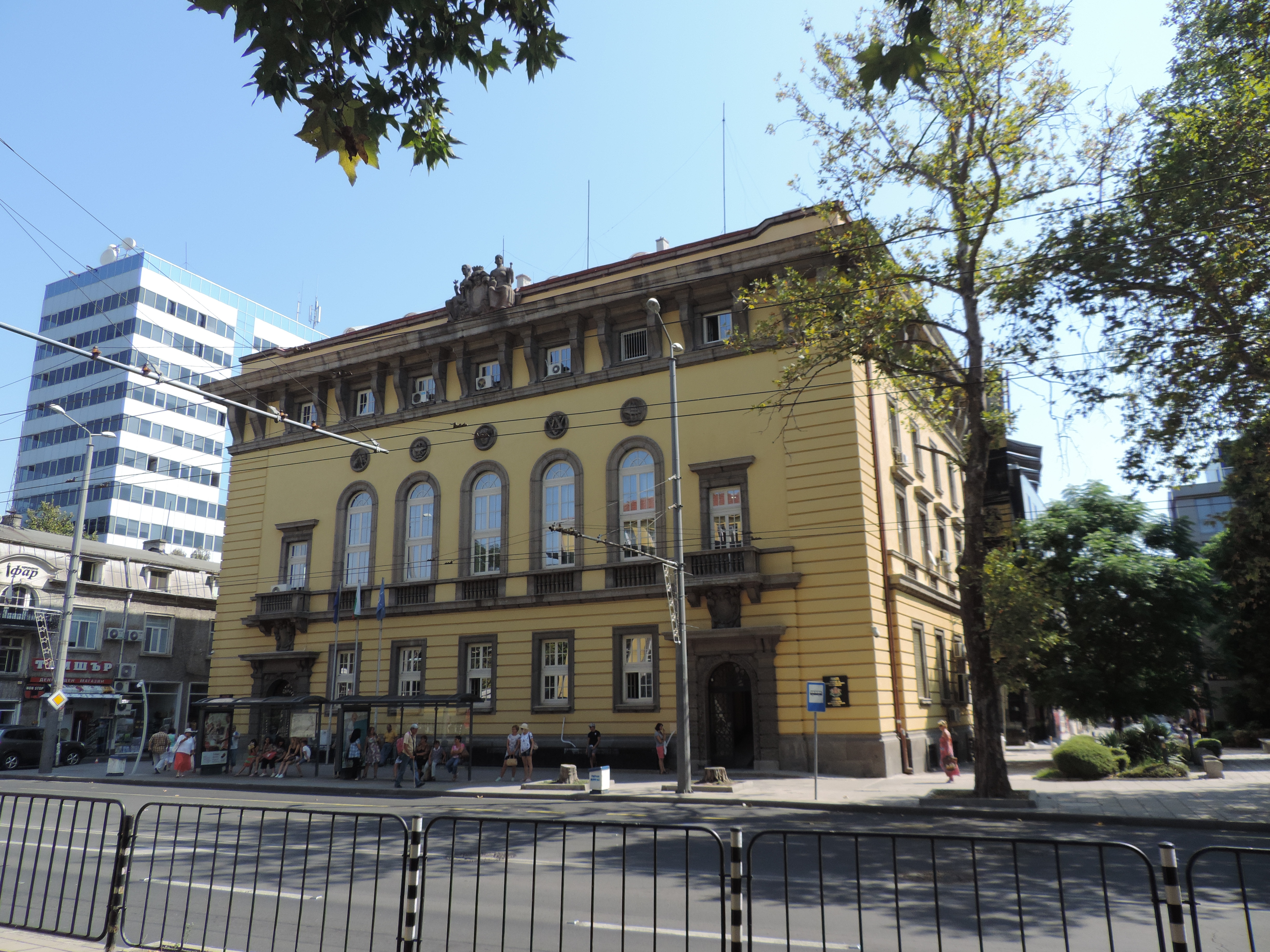
The building of the Burgas Province administration

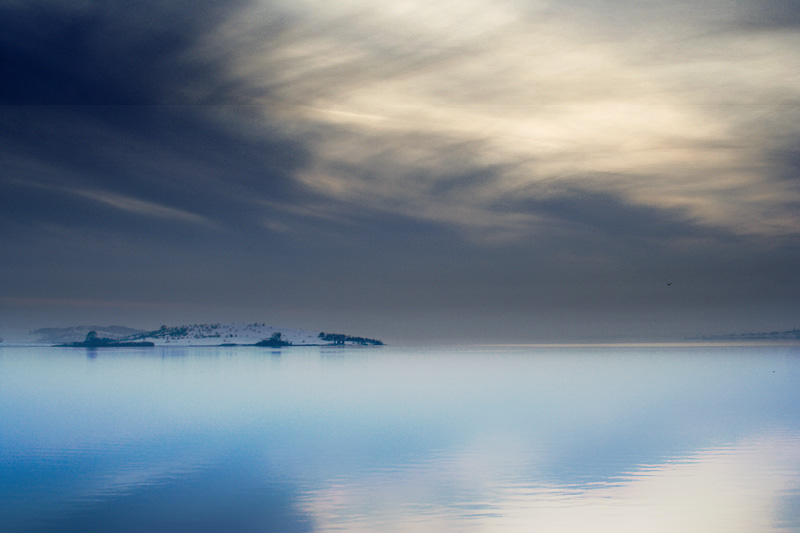
Lake Mandrensko near Burgas

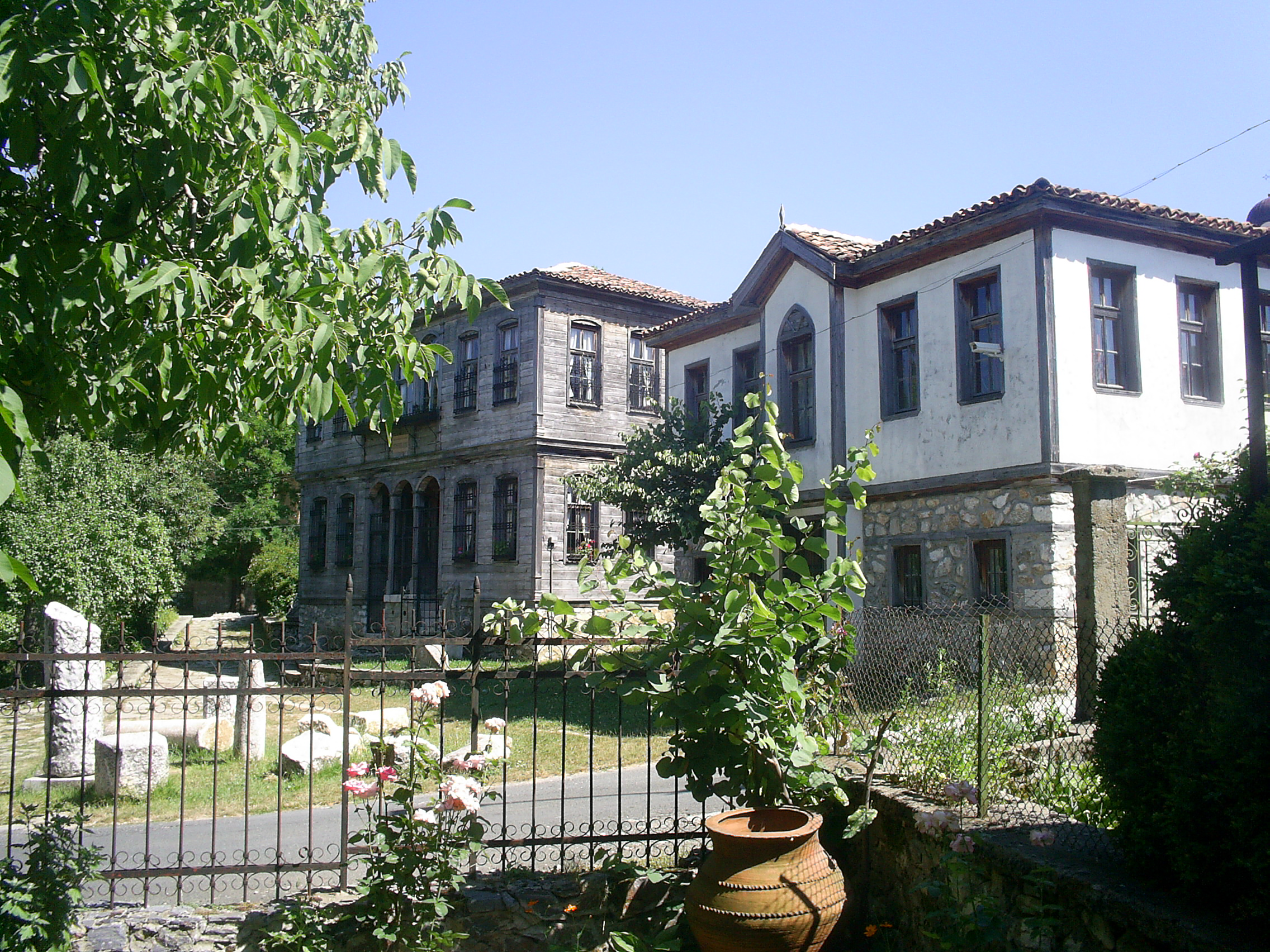
Old houses in Malko Tarnovo, Strandzha region

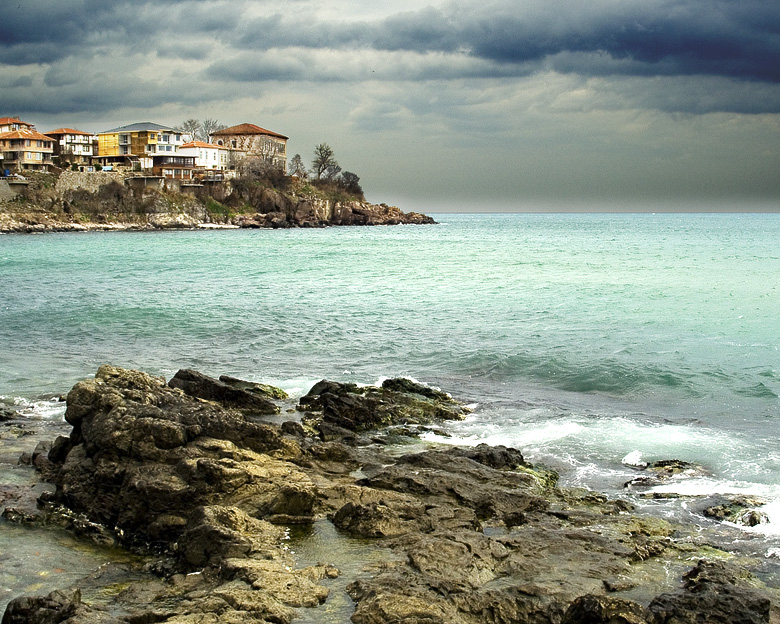
View of Sozopol

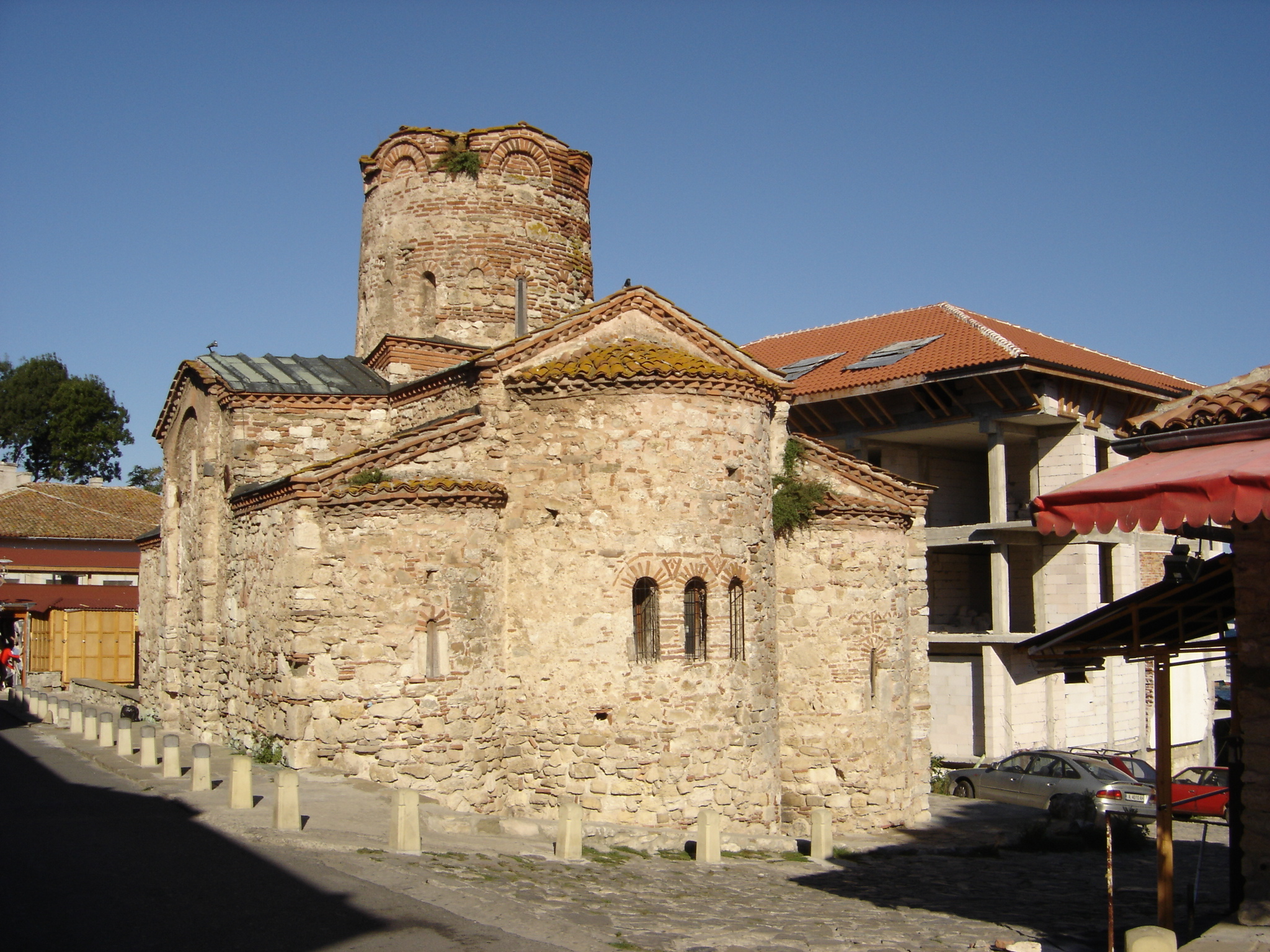
Church of St John the Baptist (11th century) in Nessebar

== Municipalities ==
Burgas Province (област, oblast) contains 13 municipalities. The following table shows the names of each municipality in English and Cyrillic, the main town or village (towns are shown in bold), and the population of each as of 2009.

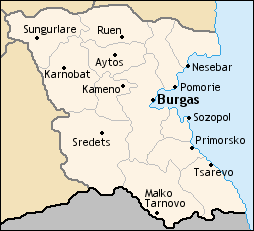
The municipalities of Burgas Province

| Municipality | Cyrillic | Pop. | Town/Village | Pop. |
|---|---|---|---|---|
| Aytos | Айтос | 30,450 | **Aytos** | 21,067 |
| Burgas | Бургас | 206,343 | **Burgas** | 193,765 |
| Kameno | Камено | 12,395 | **Kameno** | 4,848 |
| Karnobat | Карнобат | 26,576 | **Karnobat** | 18,480 |
| Malko Tarnovo | Малко Търново | 3,807 | **Malko Tarnovo** | 2,449 |
| Nesebar | Несебър | 25,311 | **Nesebar** | 11,626 |
| Pomorie | Поморие | 27,557 | **Pomorie** | 13,569 |
| Primorsko | Приморско | 7,332 | **Primorsko** | 3,340 |
| Ruen | Руен | 28,217 | Ruen | 2,282 |
| Sozopol | Созопол | 15,578 | **Sozopol** | 5,410 |
| Sredets | Средец | 16,261 | **Sredets** | 9,238 |
| Sungurlare | Сунгурларе | 13,079 | **Sungurlare** | 3,416 |
| Tsarevo | Царево | 9,413 | **Tsarevo** | 5,884 |

== Demographics ==
Historical population
| Year | Pop. | ±% |
|---|---|---|
| 1946 | 317,156 | — |
| 1956 | 352,812 | +11.2% |
| 1965 | 387,252 | +9.8% |
| 1975 | 420,268 | +8.5% |
| 1985 | 449,237 | +6.9% |
| 1992 | 441,085 | −1.8% |
| 2001 | 423,547 | −4.0% |
| 2011 | 415,817 | −1.8% |
| 2021 | 380,286 | −8.5% |
Source: pop-stat.mashke.org

Burgas Province had a population of 423,608 (423,547 also given) according to a 2001 census, of which 49% were male and 51% were female. As of the end of 2009, the population of the province, announced by the Bulgarian National Statistical Institute, numbered 422,319 of which 21.8% are inhabitants aged over 60 years.

=== Ethnic groups ===
Ethnic groups in Burgas Province (2011 census)
| Ethnic group | Percentage |
| Bulgarians | 80.5% |
| Turks | 13.3% |
| Romani | 5.0% |
| others and indefinable | 1.2% |

Total population (2011 census): 415,817
Ethnic groups (2011 census):

Identified themselves: 370,544 persons:

- Bulgarians: 298,128 (80.46%)
- Turks: 49,354 (13.32%)
- Romani: 18,424 (4.97%)
- Others and indefinable: 4,638 (1.25%)

A further 45,000 persons in Burgas Province did not declare their ethnic group at the 2011 census.

Ethnic groups according to the 2001 census, when 423 547 people of the population of 423,608 of Burgas Province identified themselves (with percentage of total population):

- Bulgarians: 338,625
- Turks: 58,636
- Romani: 19,439
- Russians: 1 107
- Armenians: 904
- Vlachs (Aromanians, Romanians, Romanian-speaking Boyash): 623
- Ukrainians: 185
- Greeks: 125

=== Religion ===
Religious adherence in the province according to 2001 census:

Census 2001
| religious adherence | population | % |
|---|---|---|
| Orthodox Christians | 339,653 | 80.19% |
| Muslims | 64,568 | 15.24% |
| Protestants | 2,339 | 0.55% |
| Roman Catholics | 452 | 0.11% |
| Other | 1,937 | 0.46% |
| Religion not mentioned | 14,598 | 3.45% |
| total | 423,547 | 100% |

== Towns and villages ==
The place names in bold have the status of town (Bulgarian: град, romanized: grad). Other localities have the status of village (Bulgarian: село, romanized: selo).

=== Aytos Municipality ===
Aytos, Cherna Mogila, Chernograd, Chukarka, Dryankovets, Karageorgievo, Karanovo, Lyaskovo, Malka Polyana, Maglen, Peshtersko, Pirne, Polyanovo, Raklinovo, Sadievo, Topolitsa, Zetyovo

=== Burgas Municipality ===
Balgarovo, Banevo, Bratovo, Bryastovets, Burgas, Cherno More, Dimchevo, Draganovo, Izvorishte, Marinka, Mirolyubovo, Ravnets, Rudnik, Tvarditsa, Vetren

=== Kameno Municipality ===
Kameno, Krastina, Livada, Konstantinovo, Polski Izvor, Rusokastro, Svoboda, Troyanovo, Trastikovo, Cherni Vrah, Vinarsko, Vratitsa, Zhelyazovo

=== Karnobat Municipality ===
Asparuhovo, Cherkovo, Detelina, Devetak, Devetintsi, Dobrinovo, Dragantsi, Dragovo, Ekzarh Antimovo, Glumche, Hadzhiite, Iskra, Karnobat, Klikach, Kozare, Krumovo Gradishte, Krushovo, Madrino, Nevestino, Ognen, Raklitsa, San-Stefano, Sigmen, Sokolovo, Sarnevo, Smolnik, Tserkovski, Venets, Zheleznik, Zhitosvyat, Zimen

=== Malko Tarnovo Municipality ===
Bliznak, Brashlyan, Byala voda, Evrenozovo, Gramatikovo, Kalovo, Malko Tarnovo, Mladezhko, Slivarovo, Stoilovo, Vizitsa, Zabernovo, Zvezdets

=== Nesebar Municipality ===
Banya, Emona, Gyulyovtsa, Koznitsa, Kosharitsa, Nesebar, Obzor, Orizare, Panitsovo, Priseltsi, Rakovskovo, Ravda, Sunny beach, Sveti Vlas, Tankovo

=== Pomorie Municipality ===
Aheloy, Belodol, Aleksandrovo, Bata, Dabnik, Gaberovo, Goritsa, Galabets, Kableshkovo, Kamenar, Kozichino, Kosovets, Laka, Medovo, Pomorie, Poroy, Stratsin

=== Primorsko Municipality ===
Kiten, Novo Panicharevo, Pismenovo, Primorsko, Veselie, Yasna polyana,

=== Ruen Municipality ===
Bilka, Cheresha, Dobra polyana, Dobromir, Dropla, Daskotna, Dyulya, Kamenyak, Karavelyovo, Listets, Lyulyakovo, Pripek, Mrezhichko, Podgorets, Preobrazhentsi, Planinitsa, Prosenik, Rechitsa, Razboyna, Razhitsa, Rozhden, Rudina, Ruen, Rupcha, Shivarovo, Skalak, Snezha, Snyagovo, Sokolets, Sredna Mahala, Struya, Sini Rid, Topchiysko, Tranak, Vishna, Vresovo, Yabalchevo, Yasenovo, Zaimchevo, Zaychar, Zvezda

=== Sozopol Municipality ===
Atia, Chernomorets, Gabar, Indzhe voyvoda, Izvor, Krushevets, Prisad, Ravadinovo, Ravna gora, Rosen, Sozopol, Varshilo, Zidarovo

=== Sredets Municipality ===
Belevren, Belila, Bistrets, Bogdanovo, Debelt, Dolno Yabalkovo, Draka, Drachevo, Dyulevo, Fakiya, Golyamo Bukovo, Gorno Yabalkovo, Granitets, Granichar, Sredets, Kirovo, Kubadin, Momina Tsarkva, Malina, Orlintsi, Prohod, Panchevo, Radoynovo, Rosenovo, Svetlina, Sinyo Kamene, Slivovo, Suhodol, Trakiytsi, Varovnik, Zagortsi, Zornitsa,

=== Sungurlare Municipality ===
Balabanchevo, Beronovo, Bosilkovo, Chernitsa, Chubra, Dabovitsa, Gorovo, Esen, Grozden, Kamensko, Kamchiya, Klimash, Kosten, Lozarevo, Lozitsa, Manolich, Pchelin, Podvis, Prilep, Sadovo, Skala, Slavyantsi, Sungurlare, Terziysko, Valchin, Vedrovo, Velislav, Vezenkovo, Zavet

=== Tsarevo Municipality ===
Ahtopol, Arapya, Brodilovo, Balgari, Fazanovo, Izgrev, Kondolovo, Kosti, Lozenets, Rezovo, Sinemorets, Tsarevo, Varvara, Velika

== See also ==
- List of cities and towns in Bulgaria
- List of villages in Burgas Province
- Municipalities of Bulgaria
- Provinces of Bulgaria
