= Kamchia (biosphere reserve) =

Reserve in Bulgaria

Kamchia Biosphere Reserve
- IUCN category Ia (strict nature reserve)
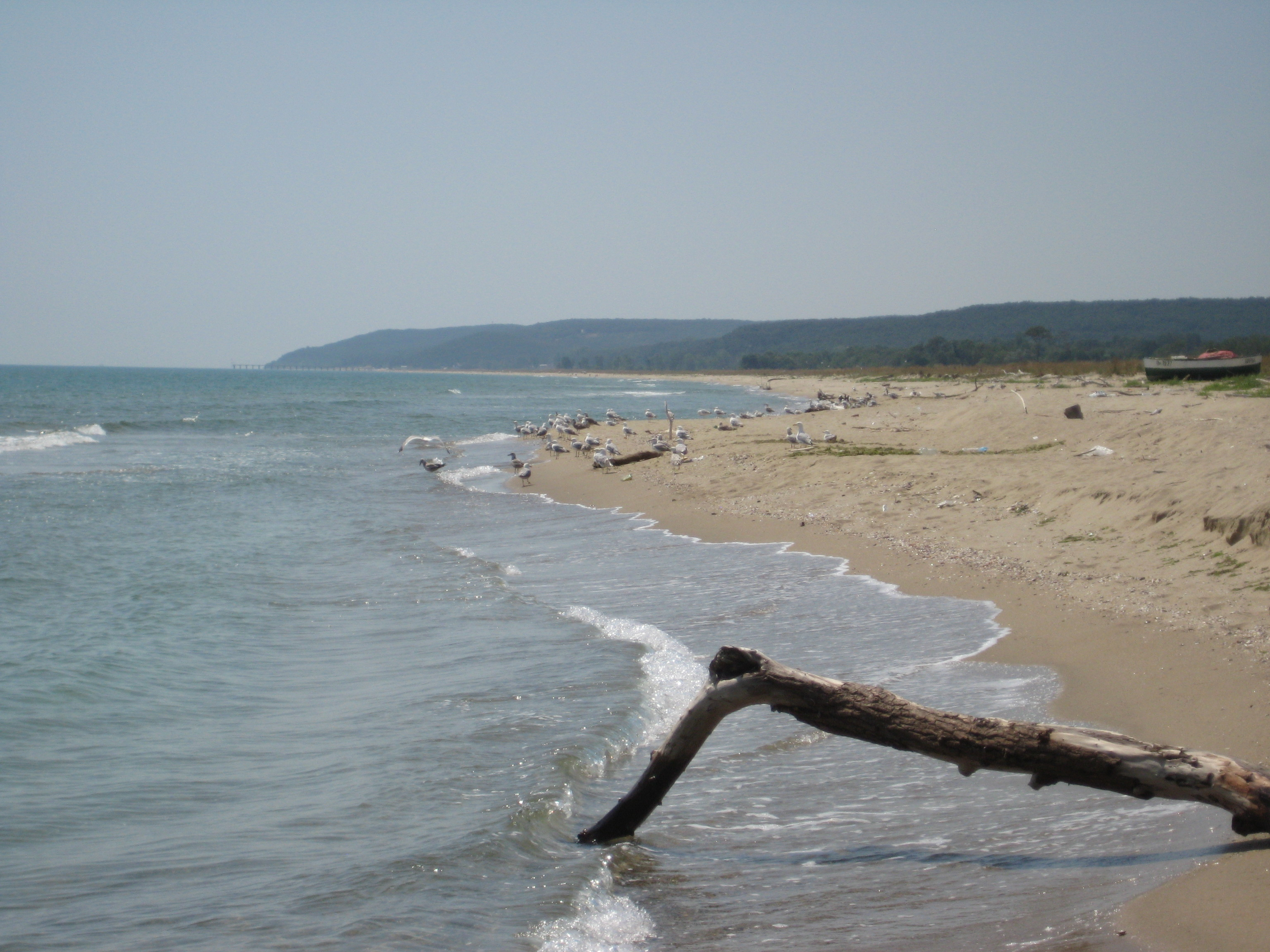

- Location within Bulgaria
- Location: Municipality of Dolni Chiflik, Varna Province, Bulgaria
- Nearest city: Varna
- Coordinates: 43°01′10.47″N 27°52′45.78″E
- Area: 10.72 km^{2}
- Established: 1977
- Governing body: Ministry of Environment and Water (Bulgaria), Regional Inspectorate of Environment and Water

The Kamchia Biosphere Reserve, (Bulgarian: Биосферен Резерват Камчия) is a former UNESCO-listed biosphere reserve on the northern coastline of Bulgaria, comprising the floodplain at the mouth of the Kamchia River. Consisting largely of alluvial longose groves, (or the Longoz as it is also known), but also featuring some of the Black Sea coastline, the area of the protected habitats in the reserve, together with Kamchia Sands Protected Area, totals 1.200 ha. Established in 1977, it protects the primeval forest from the intensive logging and drainage that had decimated it by mid-20th century. It is situated 25 km south of the town of Varna and is enclosed by the villages of Staro Oriahovo, Shkorpilovtsi and Bliznatsi.

The biosphere reserve status was removed in 2017.

== History ==
A reserve was established in 1951 to protect the remnants of floodplain forests which had once covered a considerably larger area. The biosphere reserve itself was established in 1977, as with all other Biosphere Reserves in Bulgaria. The area has been subject to logging and drainage attempts in the past. The reserve status was under revision in 2016 and was withdrawn in 2017, and publicly announced on June 14.

== Geography ==
The core area of the reserve is 842.1 ha, (with a buffer zone of 230 ha), some 764 ha of it is afforested, and the rest 78.1 ha is not afforested, (34.5 ha of meadows, 0.4 ha of channels, 3.3 ha of openings, 21.8 ha of swamps, 9.9 ha of marshlands etc.), the reserve is 40 km in length and reaches 5 km in width in some areas. The "Longoz" forests in the lower course of the river are the best representatives of their kind throughout Europe. Within the reserve there are remnant riverine forests, small freshwater marshes of Phragmites and Typha along the riverbank, arable land (the former Staro-Oryachovo marshes), a beach with sand-dunes, and a sea bay.

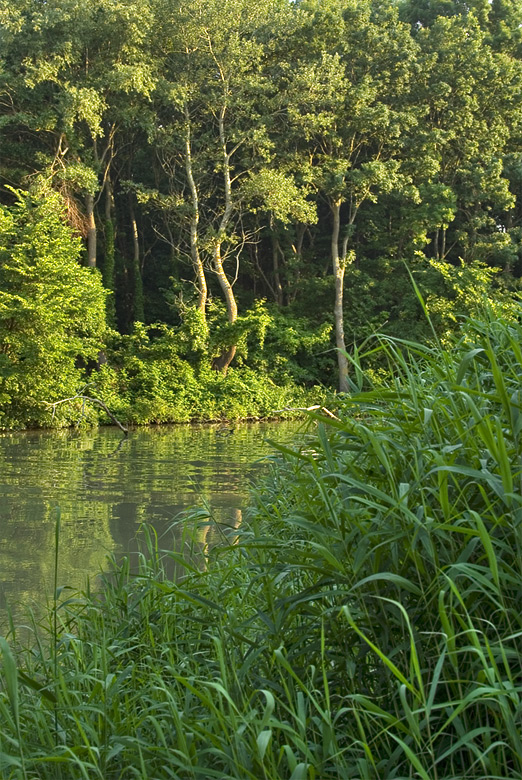
The river Kamchia running through the alluvial forest

=== Fauna ===
The area is a key site for birds and harbours almost 200 species, eight of which are considered endangered and are listed in the IUCN Red List. The site is important for wintering Cygnus cygnus and is the most important breeding area in Bulgaria for the Middle spotted woodpecker Dendrocopos medius and the semi-collared flycatcher Ficedula semitorquata. The locality is also a major migratory bottleneck site, where 60,000 or more white storks pass overhead each autumn. Other birds include a small colony of little egrets (Egretta garzetta) and the rare half-collared flycatcher (Ficedula albicollis semitorquata).

Twenty-five fish species have been recorded in the river, seven of which are listed under the IUCN Redlist, including wild common carp, (Cyprinus carpio), Knipowitschia caucasica and the Aral stickleback, (Pungitius platygaster).

Mammals in the biosphere reserve include roe deer (Capreolus capreolus), wild boar (Sus scrofa), pine marten (Martes martes) and fox (Vulpes vulpes) There are also many reptiles and amphibians, including the European pond turtle (Emys orbicularis), tessellated water snake (Natrix tessellata) and alligator lizard (Ophisaurus apodus).

There are twenty-five species of small mammals known to inhabit the reserve, including the European otter, (Lutra lutra), which is on the European IUCN Red List.

=== Flora ===
The forests are dominated by ash (Fraxinus oxyphylla), Ulmus, oak (Quercus pedunculiflora), Acer and Alnus, with scrub of Crataegus monogyna, Cornus, Paliurus and Ligustrum, and lianas of Clematis, Smilax and Periploca.

== Environment and Pollution ==
Most of the pollution in the reserve is associated with the River Kamchia's load and pollutants present there, however, that litter from tourists was once a major problem for the local authorities. Mainly this was because there was bridge which allowed people to visit the reserve. It was later destroyed, and litter became less of a problem, however since it is still possible to cross the river mouth on to the beach area of the reserve, (see image), the problem has not entirely been resolved. Additionally, litter and industrial pollutants are regularly washed up on the shore, much of which either come from the port of Varna or the nearby Resort of Kamchia, (which shares the same beach line).

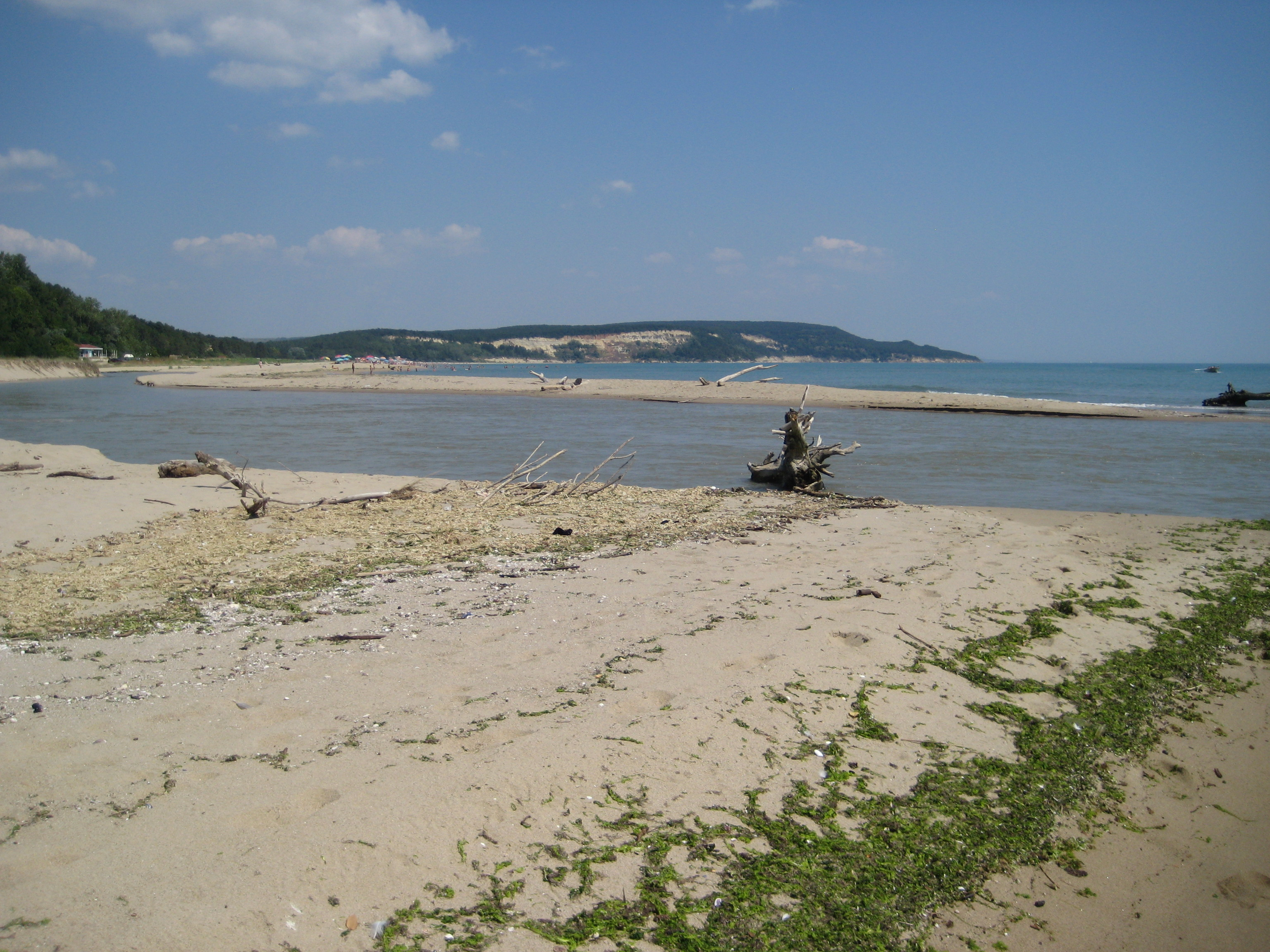
The mouth of the River Kamchia, viewing from the reserve. Note that its spit is currently facing south towards the reserve, and so much of its discharge would be directed towards the reserve's beachfront

=== Pollution associated with the river ===
A 2006 study conducted by the Institute of Oceanology and the Bulgarian Academy of Sciences on the water quality and its impact on the Black Sea coastal zone, (and so on the reserve as well) concluded that

Nutrients content (nitrite, phosphate) in Kamchia River downstream does not always correspond to national water quality standards. The comparison of data from different periods of investigation reveals a slight tendency of decreasing of phosphate and nitrites content and BOD. A decreasing tendency was established as a positive sign of water quality evolution last years

—

Other environmental issues are that the river is purportedly becoming marshy. The water lily, torfaceous snowdrop, and white Kamchia lily are also disappearing according to the World Wildlife Fund. The Storage Battery Plant in Targovishte is a significant polluter, spilling heavy metals into the Kamchia River.

Cattle breeding is the second major source of water pollution and directly affects sources of drinking water. Due to a serious lack of water purification stations on cattle farms, non-purified waste waters pour into the various water basins. The same holds true for the underground waters, as nitrates, phosphates, and other minerals used in farming are dissolved and washed away by rains, to appear subsequently in water basins and mineral springs. As the river runs directly through the biosphere reserve, it has a strong impact on ecosystems within it. Since the entire area is irrigated by the river all of the animals and plants living there are dependent on it for their survival.

However, on a more positive note, as a result of improvements to the Kamchia River, it no longer floods the dense forest. It was seen as responsible for the spread of Dutch elm disease, which was causing great damage to elms and ash trees.

== See also ==
- List of biosphere reserves in Bulgaria
- River Kamchia
- Varna
