= Kamchia =

Kamchia or Kamchiya may refer to:

- Kamchia (river), a 244.5 km long river in eastern Bulgaria.
- Resort of Kamchiya, a Black Sea coastal resort named after the river in north-east Bulgaria.
- Kamchia (biosphere reserve), a biosphere reserve in north-east Bulgaria which borders the resort and is also named after the river.
- Kamchia (village), a village in central-western Bulgaria, Burgas Province.
- Kamchiya Glacier, a glacier located on Livingston Island, Antarctica, named after the Kamchiya River.
