= Škorpil =

Škorpil (feminine: Škorpilová) is a Czech surname. Notable people with the surname include:

- Hermenegild Škorpil, Czech archaeologist
- Karel Škorpil, Czech archaeologist
- Ladislav Škorpil, Czech football manager
