= Dolni Chiflik Municipality =

Dolni Chiflik Municipality Община Долни чифлик
- Municipality
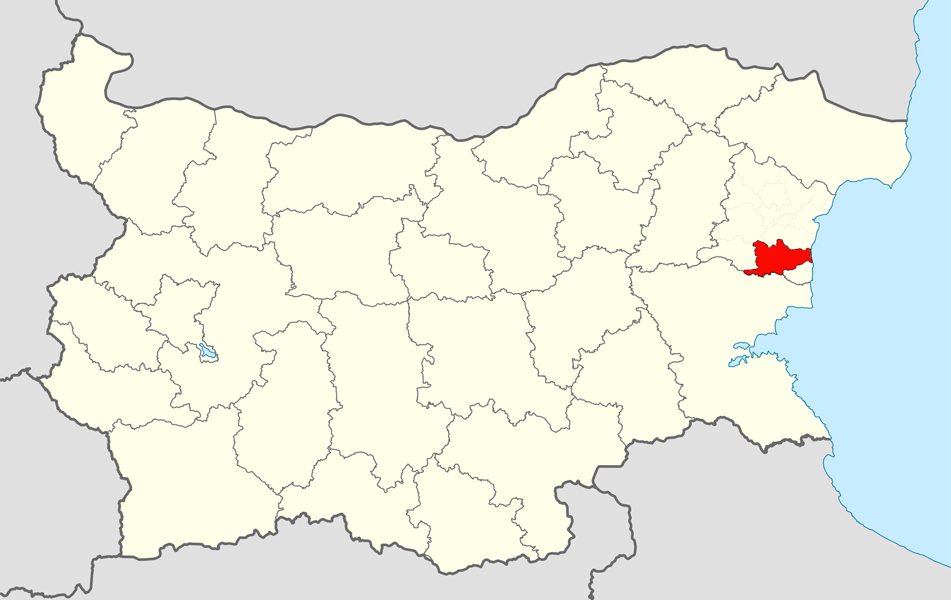
- Dolni Chiflik Municipality within Bulgaria and Varna Province.
- Coordinates: 42°58′N 27°41′E
- Country: Bulgaria
- Province (Oblast): Varna
- Admin. centre (Obshtinski tsentar): Dolni Chiflik

Area
  - Total: 487 km^{2} (188 sq mi)

Population (December 2009)
  - Total: 19,316
  - Density: 39.7/km^{2} (103/sq mi)
- Time zone: UTC+2 (EET)
  - Summer (DST): UTC+3 (EEST)

Dolni Chiflik Municipality (Bulgarian: Община Долни чифлик) is a municipality (obshtina) in Varna Province, Northeastern Bulgaria. It is named after its administrative centre: the town of Dolni Chiflik.

The municipality spreads from Dalgopol Municipality in the west to the Bulgarian Black Sea Coast in the east. To the north the area is mostly defined by the Kamchiya river and its estuary. Its territory is 487 km^{2} (188 sq mi), with a population, as of December 2009, of 19,316 inhabitants.

== Settlements ==
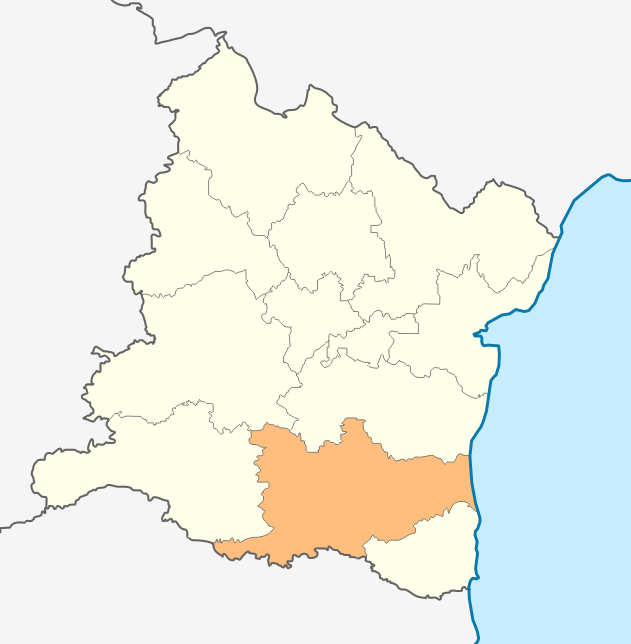
Dolni Chiflik Municipality within Varna Province

Dolni Chiflik Municipality includes the following 17 places (towns are shown in bold):

Town/Village	Cyrillic	Population (December 2009)
**Dolni Chiflik**	**Долни чифлик**	6,706
Bulair	Булаир	158
Bardarevo	Бърдарево	87
Detelina	Детелина	664
Golitsa	Голица	596
Goren Chiflik	Горен чифлик	1,450
Grozdyovo	Гроздьово	2,389
Krivini	Кривини	110
Nova Shipka	Нова Шипка	291
Novo Oryahovo	Ново Оряхово	206
Pchelnik	Пчелник	1,614
Rudnik	Рудник	494
Solnik	Солник	249
Staro Oryahovo	Старо Оряхово	2,713
Shkorpilovtsi	Шкорпиловци	704
Venelin	Венелин	818
Yunets	Юнец	67
Total		19,316

== Demography ==
The population of Dolni Chiflik Municipality is 20,217, of which 12,857 Bulgarians, 5,390 Turks and 717 Roma.

The following table shows the change of the population during the last four decades.

Dolni Chiflik Municipality
**Year**	1975	1985	1992	**2001**	2005	2007	2009	**2011**
**Population**	20,535	20,817	20,944	20,217	19,534	19,354	19,316	...
Sources: Census 2001, Census 2011, „pop-stat.mashke.org“,

=== Religion ===
According to the latest Bulgarian census of 2011, the religious composition, among those who answered the optional question on religious identification, was the following:

Religious composition of Dolni Chiflik Municipality
Orthodox Christianity	66.8%
Catholicism	0.5%
Protestantism	0.3%
Islam	15.1%
No religion	7.4%
Prefer not to answer, others and indefinable	9.9%

A majority of the population of Dolni Chiflik Municipality identify themselves as Christians. At the 2011 census, 66.8% of respondents identified as Orthodox Christians belonging to the Bulgarian Orthodox Church. Muslims constitute the second largest religious group with 15.1% of the population.

== See also ==
- Provinces of Bulgaria
- Municipalities of Bulgaria
- List of cities and towns in Bulgaria
