= Venelin =

Village in Varna Province, Bulgaria

Venelin Венелин
- Village
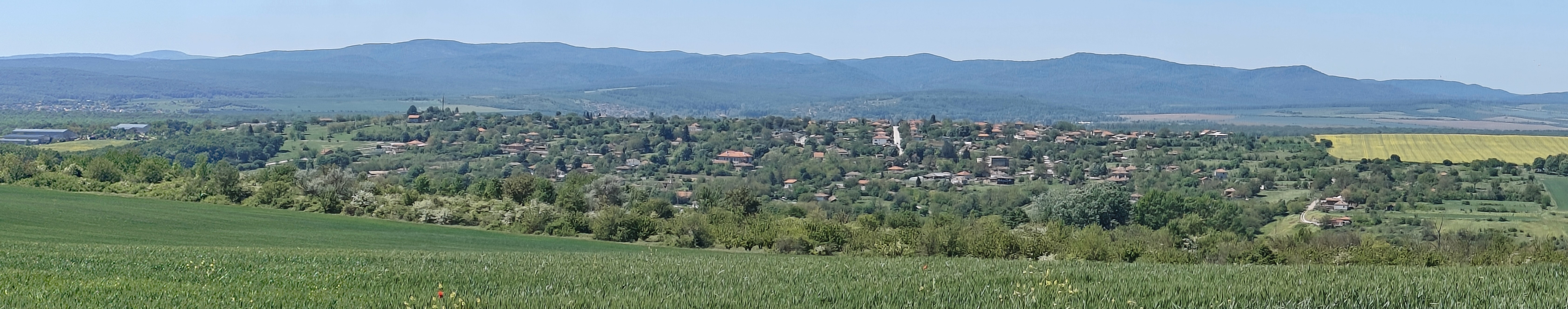
- Panoramic view of Venelin, May 2026

- Location of Venelin in Bulgaria
- Coordinates: 43°02′46″N 27°40′08″E
- Country: Bulgaria
- Province (Oblast): Varna Province
- Municipality (Obshtina): Dolni Chiflik

Government
  - Mayor: Edaet Mehmedov Niaziev (GERB; elected 2026)

Area
  - Total: 16.06 km^{2} (6.20 sq mi)

Population (2024)
  - Total: 744
  - Density: 46.3/km^{2} (120/sq mi)
- Time zone: UTC+2 (EET)
  - Summer (DST): UTC+3 (EEST)
- Postal code: 9119
- Area code: 05147
- EKATTE: 10611

Venelin (Bulgarian: Венелин) is a village in northeastern Bulgaria, located in Dolni Chiflik Municipality, Varna Province. The village had 744 inhabitants as of 31 December 2024.

== Geography ==
Venelin lies on the left bank of the Kamchia River. The village covers an area of 16.06 km².

== History ==
The settlement appears in Ottoman-era records as Sarı Hadırlar (1573), Sarı Hadır (1679), and Sarh Hadır (1689); the Turkish-derived name has been variously interpreted as meaning "yellow millet" (sarı darı) or as a reference to sarık ("turban"). Until 1934, the village was commonly known as Saradar (Саръдър). It was renamed Venelin in 1934 after the Rusyn Slavist Yuriy Venelin (1802–1839), whose scholarly work on the Bulgarians played an important role in the Bulgarian National Revival.

== Demographics ==
Population of the village according to censuses and official estimates:

Population of Venelin
Year	Population	Change
1934	1,481	—
1946	1,322	−10.7%
1956	1,242	−6.1%
1965	965	−22.3%
1975	901	−6.6%
1985	787	−12.7%
1992	779	−1.0%
2001	829	+6.4%
2011	908	+9.5%
2021	732	−19.4%

=== Ethnic composition ===
According to the 2011 Bulgarian census, Venelin had 908 residents; reported ethnicity was as follows:

Ethnic composition (2011 census)
Group	Number	Share (%)
Turks	357	39.31
Bulgarians	236	25.99
Roma	10	1.10
Did not answer	299	32.92
Other / preferred not to answer	6	0.66
Total	908	100.00^{*}
^{*}Percentages may not sum to 100% due to rounding.

== Culture ==
The local chitalishte (community cultural centre) "Probuda" was founded in 1905. It maintains an authentic-folklore ensemble dedicated to the traditions of the Vayatsi, a Bulgarian ethnographic group from the Eastern Stara Planina.

The village church is dedicated to Saint Michael the Archangel, with the village's annual fair held on Archangel's Day according to the Old Style calendar (21 November).
