= Varna Necropolis =

Pre-historic burial site in Bulgaria

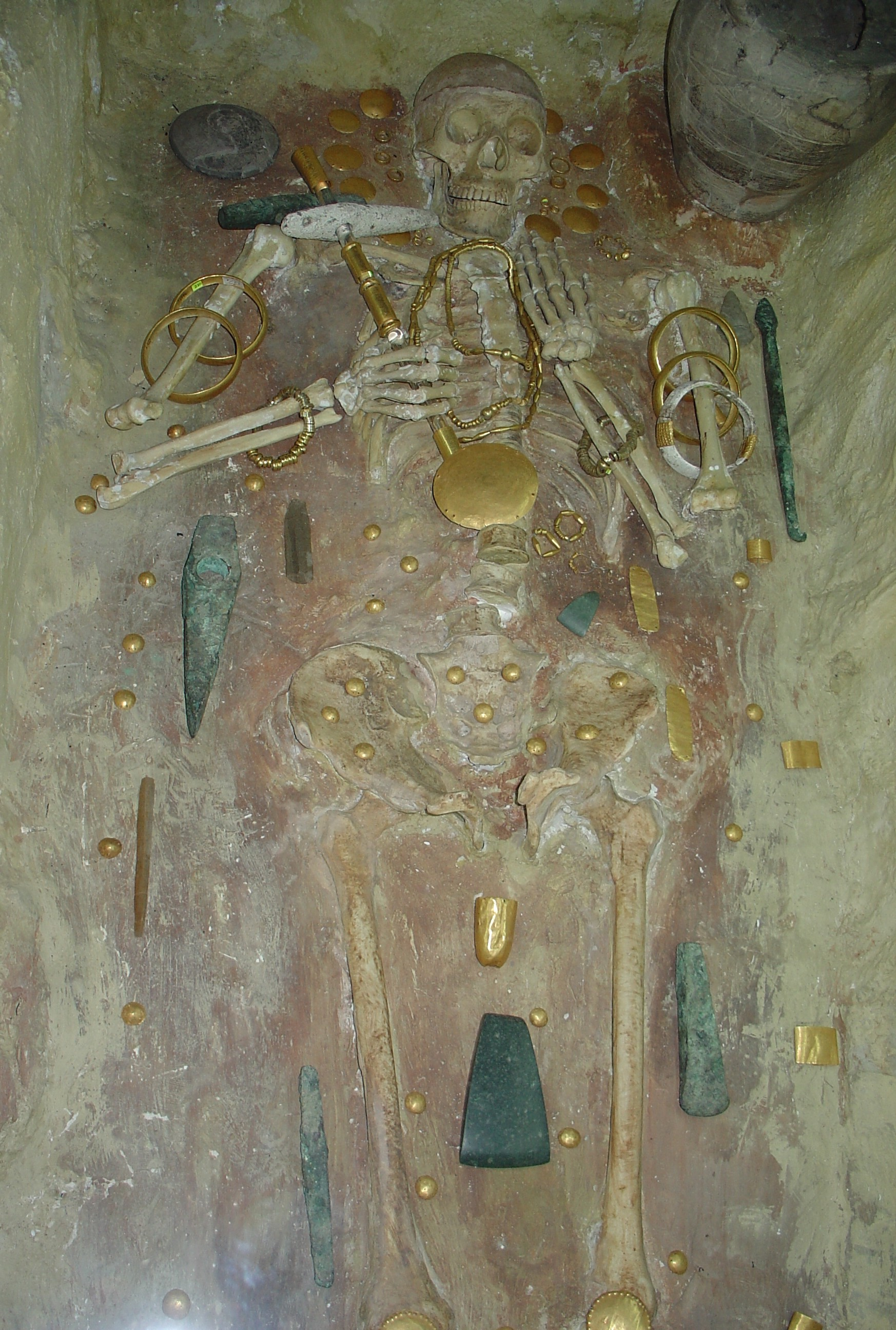
- Exposition of the skeleton and the objects found in grave No. 43, which can be seen at the Varna Archaeological Museum
- Interactive map of Varna Necropolis
- 43°12′47″N 27°51′52″E
- Type: Cemetery
- Location: Varna, Varna Province, Bulgaria

History
- Built: c. 4569 BC
- Abandoned: c. 4340 BC

Site notes
- Discovered: October 1972 by Raycho Marinov

The Varna Necropolis (Bulgarian: Варненски некропол), or Varna Cemetery, is a burial site in the western industrial zone of Varna (approximately half a kilometre from Lake Varna and 4 km from the city centre), internationally considered one of the key archaeological sites in world prehistory. The oldest gold treasure and jewelry in the world, dating from 4600 BC to 4200 BC, was discovered at the site. Several prehistoric Bulgarian finds are considered no less old – the golden treasures of Hotnitsa, Durankulak, artifacts from the Kurgan settlement of Yunatsite near Pazardzhik, the golden treasure Sakar, as well as beads and gold jewelry found in the Kurgan settlement of Provadia – Solnitsata (“salt pit”). However, Varna gold is most often called the oldest since this treasure is the largest and most diverse.

== Discovery and excavation ==
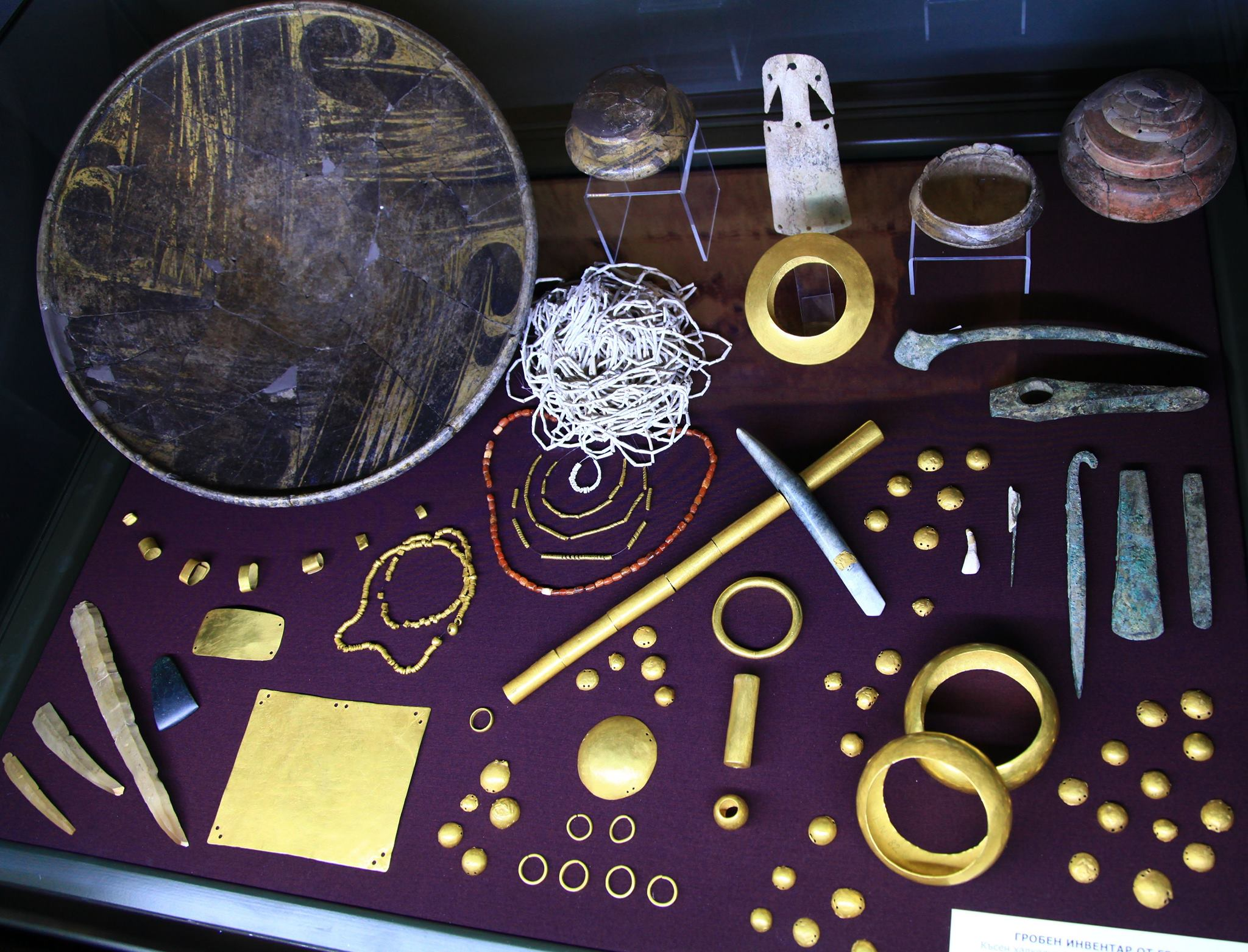
Varna necropolis, grave offerings on exhibit at the Varna Museum

The site was accidentally discovered in October 1972 by excavator operator Raycho Marinov. The first person to value the significant historical meaning was Dimitar Zlatarski, the creator of the Dalgopol Historical Museum, when he was called by the locals to examine what they had found earlier that day. He realized how important the finding was, so he contacted the Varna Historical Museum and, after signing government papers, he handed over the research to the direction of Mihail Lazarov (1972–1976) and Ivan Ivanov (1972–1991). About 30% of the estimated necropolis area is still not excavated.

A total of 294 graves have been found in the necropolis, many containing sophisticated examples of metallurgy (gold and copper), pottery (about 600 pieces, including gold-painted ones), high-quality flint and obsidian blades, beads, and shells.

== Chronology ==
The graves have been dated to 4569–4340 BC by radiocarbon dating in 2006 and belong to the Chalcolithic Varna culture, which is the local variant of the KGKVI.

== Burial rites ==
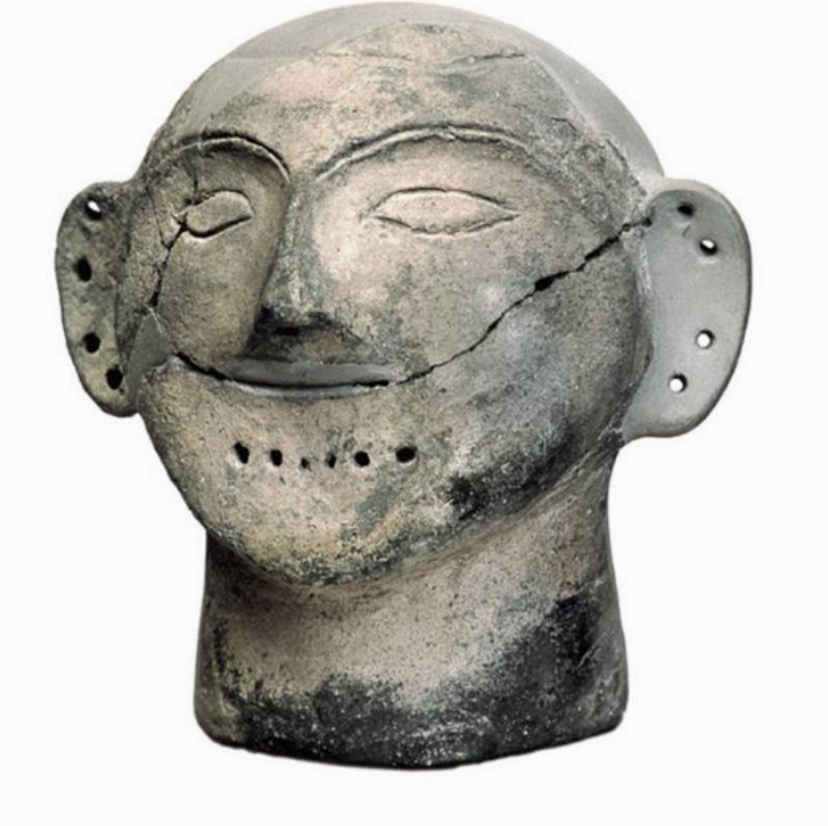
Clay anthropomorphic head, Late Chalcolithic period, c. 4250 BC, Hamangia Culture, found submerged in Varna Lake, Varna Archeology Museum

There are crouched and straight inhumations. Some graves do not contain a skeleton, but grave gifts (cenotaphs). These symbolic (empty) graves are the richest in gold artifacts. Three thousand gold artifacts have been found, with a weight of approximately six kilograms. Grave 43 contained more gold than has been found in the entire rest of the world for that epoch. It was initially identified as the grave of a prince, but is now thought to be that of a smith. Three symbolic graves contained masks of unbaked clay.

"Varna is the oldest cemetery yet found where humans were buried with abundant golden ornaments. … The weight and the number of gold finds in the Varna cemetery exceeds by several times the combined weight and number of all of the gold artifacts found in all excavated sites of the same millenium, 5000-4000 BC, from all over the world, including Mesopotamia and Egypt. … Three graves contained gold objects that together accounted for more than half of the total weight of all gold grave goods yielded by the cemetery. A scepter, symbol of a supreme secular or religious authority, was discovered in each of these three graves." (Slavchev 2010)

The findings showed that the Varna culture had trade relations with distant lands (possibly including the lower Volga and the Cyclades), perhaps exporting metal goods and salt from the Provadiya rock salt mine — Solnitsata. The copper ore used in the artifacts originated from a Sredna Gora mine near Stara Zagora, and Mediterranean Spondylus shells found in the graves may have served as primitive currency.

The culture had sophisticated religious beliefs about afterlife and had developed hierarchical status differences. The site offers the oldest known burial evidence of an elite man. (Marija Gimbutas claims that the end of the fifth millennium BC is the time that the development to male dominance began in Europe.) The high status man buried with the most remarkable amount of gold held a war adze or mace and wore a gold penis sheath or likely a belt tip made of gold. Bull-shaped gold platelets might also have venerated virility, instinctual force, and warfare. Gimbutas holds that the artifacts were made largely by local craftspeople.

== Historical impact ==
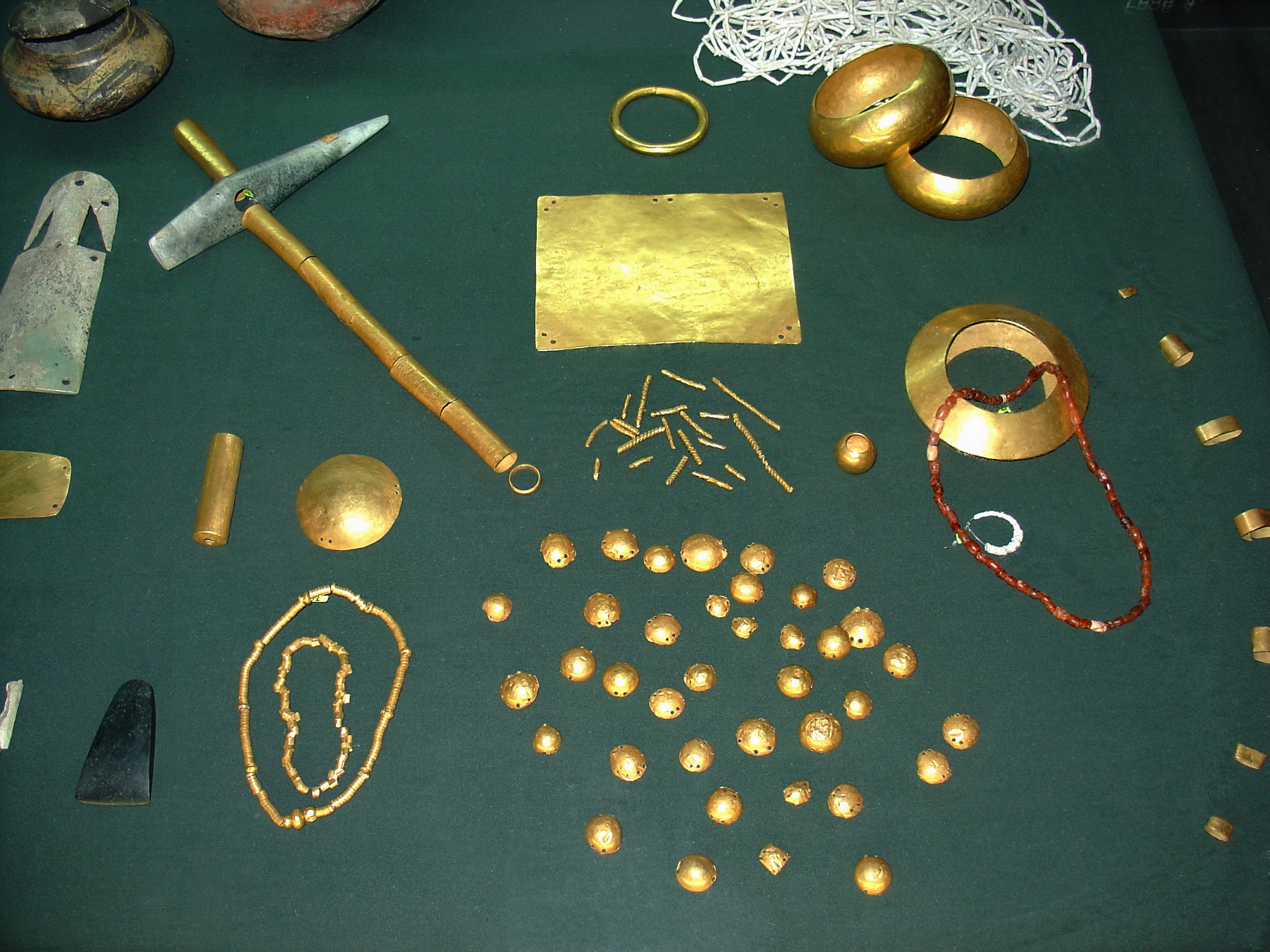
Golden objects found in the necropolis

Gimbutas (1991) asserted: "The discontinuity of the Varna, Karanovo, Vinča, and Lengyel cultures in their main territories and the large scale population shifts to the north and northwest are indirect evidence of a catastrophe of such proportions that cannot be explained by possible climatic change, land exhaustion, or epidemics (for which there is no evidence in the second half of the 5th millennium BC). Direct evidence of the incursion of horse-riding warriors is found, not only in single burials of males under barrows, but in the emergence of a whole complex of Kurgan cultural traits."

According to John Chapman, "Once upon a time, not so very long ago, it was widely accepted that steppe nomads from the North Pontic zone invaded the Balkans, putting an end to the Climax Copper Age society that produced the apogee of tell living, autonomous copper metallurgy and, as the grandest climax, the Varna cemetery with its stunning early goldwork. Now the boot is very much on the other foot and it is the Varna complex and its associated communities that are held responsible for stimulating the onset of prestige goods-dominated steppe mortuary practice following the expansion of farming."

Among the metallic (gold and copper) and non-metallic (minerals, rocks, pottery, pigments, biofacts) artifacts in the graves from the Varna Chalcolithic site are numerous beads of a chalcedony (carnelian) and agate composition. Three main morphological types of beads are described: type 1 – elongated barrel-shaped; type 2 – elongated with trapezohedral facets; type 3 – short cylindrical (Kostov, 2007; Kostov, Pelevina, 2008). The carnelian and related beads of type 2 have a "constant" number of 32 facets – 16+16 on both sides on the elongation of the bead, which is considered probably the earliest in Chalcolithic complex faceting on such a hard mineral (hardness of chalcedony is 6.5–7 on the Mohs scale). In the hole of a single carnelian bead was found a gold mini-cylinder (~2 by 2 millimetres [0.079 in × 0.079 in]). The gold artifacts from the Varna Chalcolithic necropolis are assumed to be the "oldest gold of mankind" according to their total volume and quantity. Analysis of the measured weight of the different types of gold artеfacts (beads, appliqués, rings, bracelets, pectorals and diadems) revealed a weight system with at least two minimal weight units of ~0.14 grams (0.0049 oz) and ~0.40 grams (0.014 oz) among both mineral and gold beads (Kostov, 2004; 2007). The second one (=2 carats) was suggested as a basic "Chalcolithic unit" with the name van (from the first letters of Varna necropolis).

== Museum exhibitions ==
The artifacts can be seen at the Varna Archaeological Museum and at the National Historical Museum in Sofia. In 2006, some gold objects were included in a major and broadly advertised national exhibition of antique gold treasures in both Sofia and Varna.

The Varna gold started touring the world in 1973; it was included in "The Gold of the Thracian Horseman" national exhibition, shown at many of the world's leading museums and exhibition venues in the 1970s. In 1982, it was exhibited for 7 months in Japan as "The Oldest Gold in the World – The First European Civilization" with massive publicity, including two full length TV documentaries. In the 1980s and 1990s it was also shown in Canada, Germany, France, Italy, and Israel, among others, and featured in a cover story by the National Geographic Magazine.

The Varna necropolis artifacts were shown for the first time in the United States in 1998 and 1999 as part of a major Bulgarian archaeological exhibition, Thracians' Riches: Treasures from Bulgaria. In 2009–2010, several artifacts were shown at the New York University Institute for the Study of the Ancient World in a joint Bulgarian-Romanian-Moldovan exhibition entitled The Lost World of Old Europe: The Danube Valley, 5000–3500 BC.

== See also ==
- Old Europe
- Prehistoric Balkans
- Varna culture, Hamangia culture (directly related)
- Gumelnița–Karanovo culture, Karanovo culture, Lengyel culture (distantly related)

== Bibliography ==
- Anthony, D. W., J. Y. Chi (Eds.) 2010. The Lost World of Old Europe: The Danube Valley, 5000–3500 BC. Princeton, U.P.
- Avramova, M. 2000. Myth, ritual and gold of a "civilization that did not take place". – In: Varna Necropolis. Varna, Agató, 15–24.
- Bahn, P. G. (ed.). 1995. 100 Great Archaeological Discoveries. New York, Barnes & Noble, No. 34.
- Bailey, D. W. 2004. Varna. – In: Bogucki, P., P. J. Crabtree (Eds.). Ancient Europe 8000 B.C. – A.D. 1000. Vol. 1. The Mesolithic to Copper Age (c. 8000–2000 B.C.). New York, Scribner's, 341–344.
- Chapman, J. 1990. Social inequality on Bulgarian tells and the Varna problem. – In: R. Samson (ed.). The Social Archaeology of Houses, Edinburgh, Edinburgh University Press, 49–98.
- Chapman, J. 1991. The creation of social arenas in Varna. – In: P. Garwood (Ed.). Sacred and Profane. Oxford University Committee for Archaeology, Monograph 32, 152–171.
- Chapman, J., T. Higham, B. Gaydarska, V. Slavchev, N. Honch. 2006. The social context of the emergence, development and abandonment of the Varna Cemetery, Bulgaria. – European Journal of Archaeology, Vol. 9, No. 2–3, 159–183.
- Chapman, J., B. Gaydarska, V. Slavchev. 2008. The life histories of Spondylus shell rings from the Varna I Eneolithic cemetery (Northeast Bulgaria): transformation, revelation, fragmentation and deposition. – Acta Musei Varnaensis, 6, 139–162.
- Éluére, Ch., D. Raub. 1991. Investigations on the gold coating technology of the great dish from Varna. – In: J.-P. Mohen (Ed.). Découverte du métal. Picard, Paris, 13–30.
- Fol, A., J. Lichardus (eds.). 1988. Macht, Herrschaft und Gold: das Graberfeld von Varna (Bulgarien) und die Anfänge einer neuen europäischen Zivilisation. Saarbrücken, Moderne Galerie des Saarland–Museums.
- Gimbutas, M. 1977. Varna: a sensationally rich cemetery at the Karanovo civilization: about 4500 B.C. – Expedition, Summer, 39–47.
- Hayden, B. 1998. An archaeological evaluation of the Gimbutas paradigm. – In: The Virtual Pomegranate, 6.
- Higham, T., J. Chapman, V. Slavchev, B. Gaydarska, N. Honch, Y. Yordanov, B. Dimitrova. 2007. New perspectives on the Varna cemetery (Bulgaria) – AMS dates and social implications. – Antiquity, 81, 313, 640–651.
- Ivanov, I. 1977. La nécropole chalcolithique de Varna. – Obzor, 38, 87–96.
- Ivanov, I. 1978. Les fouilles archéologiques de la nécropole chalcolithique а Varna (1972–1976). – Studia Praehistorica, 1–2, 13–26.
- Ivanov, I. 1982. The Varna Chalcolithic necropolis. – In: The First Civilization in Europe and the Oldest Gold in the World – Varna, Bulgaria. Nippon Television Network Cultural Society, 21–24.
- Ivanov, I. 1986. Der kupferzeitlishe Friedhof in Varna. – In: G. Biegel (Hrsg.). Das erste Gold der Menschheit. Die älteste Zivilisation in Europa. Freiburg, 30–42.
- Ivanov, I. 1988. Die Ausgrabungen des Gräberfeldes von Varna. – In: Fol, A., J. Lichardus (Hrsg.). Macht, Herrschaft und Gold. Moderne–Galerie des Saarlands–Museum, Saarbrüken, Krüger, 49–66, 67–78.
- Ivanov, I. 1991. Les objets metalliques de la necropole chalcolithique de Varna. – In: Découverte du metal. Paris, 9–12.
- Ivanov, I. S., M. Avramova. 1997. Varna i razhdaneto na evropeiskata tsivilizatsiia. Sofia (in Bulgarian).
- Ivanov, I., M. Avramova. 2000. Varna Necropolis. The Dawn of European Civilization. Sofia, Agató, 55 p.
- Kănchev, K. 1978. Microwear studies of the weapons and tools from the chalcolithic necropolis at the city of Varna. – Studia Praehistorica, 1–2, 46–49.
- Kostov, R. I. 2004. Prehistoric weight system among the gold objects of the Varna Chalcolithic necropolis. – Geology and Mineral Resources, 11, 3, 25–28 (in Bulgarian with an English abstract).
- Kostov, R. I. 2007. Archaeomineralogy of Neolithic and Chalcolithic Artifacts from Bulgaria and their Significance to Gemmology. Sofia, Publishing House "St. Ivan Rilski", 126 p., I–VIII (in Bulgarian with an English summary).
- Kostov, R. I. 2016. Symmetry of form and weight: standardization of gold and mineral artifacts from the Varna Chalcolithic necropolis (5th millennium BC). – In: Symmetry Festival 2016 (Ed. by G. Darvas). Vienna, 18–23 July 2016, 176–179.
- Kostov, R. I., O. Pelevina. 2008. Complex faceted and other carnelian beads from the Varna Chalcolithic necropolis: gemmological analysis. – In: Proceedings of the International Conference "Geology and Archaeomineralogy". Sofia, 29–30 October 2008. Sofia, Publishing House "St. Ivan Rilski", 67–72.
- Kostov, R. I., T. Dimov, O. Pelevina. 2004. Gemmological characteristics of carnelian and agate beads from the Chalcolithic necropolis at Durankulak and Varna. – Geology and Mineral Resources, 11, 10, 15–24 (in Bulgarian with an English abstract).
- Krauß, R., S. Zäuner, E. Pernicka. 2014. Statistical and Anthropological Analysis of the Varna Necropolis.- In: H. Meller, R. Risch, E. Pernicka (Hrsg.). Metalle der Macht – Frühes Gold und Silber. – 6. Mitteldeutscher Archäologentag vom 17. bis 19. Oktober 2013 in Halle (Saale). Tagungen des Landesmuseums für Vorgeschichte Halle 11/II. Halle, 371–387.
- Krauß, R., C. Schmid, D. Kirschenheuter, J. Abele, V. Slavchev, B. Weninger. 2017. Chronology and development of the Chalcolithic necropolis of Varna I. – Documenta Praehistorica 44, 282–305 [online
- Kuleff, I. 2009. Archeometric investigation of gold in the Chalcolithic necropolis of Varna (5th millennium BC) – Advances in Bulgarian Science, 2, 16–22.
- Manolakakis, L. 2008. Le mobilier en silex taille des tombes de Varna I. – Acta Musei Varnaensis, 6, 115–138.
- Manolakakis L. 2005. Les industries lithiques énéolithiques de Bulgarie: Die kupferzeitliche Steinbearbeitung in Bulgarien (Internationale Archäologie), Marie Leidorf.
- Marazov, I. 1997. The blacksmith as 'King' in the necropolis of Varna. – In: J. Marler (Ed.). From the Realm.
- Marler, J. 1999. A response to Brian Hayden's article "An archaeological evaluation of the Gimbutas paradigm". – In: The Virtual Pomegranate, 10.
- Nikolov, V. 1994. Der soziale und religious-mythologische Kontext des Goldes in der Nekropole bei Varna. – Ann. Department of Archaeology, New Bulgarian University, I, 4–7.
- Renfrew, C. 1978. Varna and the social context of early metallurgy. – Antiquity, 52, 206, 199–203; doi=10.1017/S0003598X00072197|s2cid=162450895
- Renfrew, C. 1986. Varna and the emergence of wealth in prehistoric Europe. – In: The Social Life of Things: Commodities in Cultural Perspective (A. Appadurai, Ed.). Cambridge, Cambridge University Press, 141–168.
- Renfrew, C., P. Bahn. 1996. Archaeology: theories, methods, and practice. New York, Thames and Hudson.
- Slavchev, V. 2004. Fragmentation research and the Varna Eneolithic cemetery Spondylus rings. – Proceedings of the Varna Round Table.
- Smolenov, H., H. Mihailov, V. Bozhilov. 2009. Archeo-Logique: La méthode heuristique des symboles et des conniassances sacrés. Sofia, Magoart.
- Todorova, H. 1978. The Eneolithic Period in Bulgaria in the Fifth Millennium B.C. Oxford, British Archaeological Reports, BAR supplementary series 49.
- Todorova, H. 1982. Kupferzeitliche Siedlungen in Nordostbulgarien. München, Beck, Materialien zur Allgemeinen und Vergleichenden Archäologie, Band 13.
