= Karel Škorpil =

Czech-Bulgarian archaeologist and museum worker

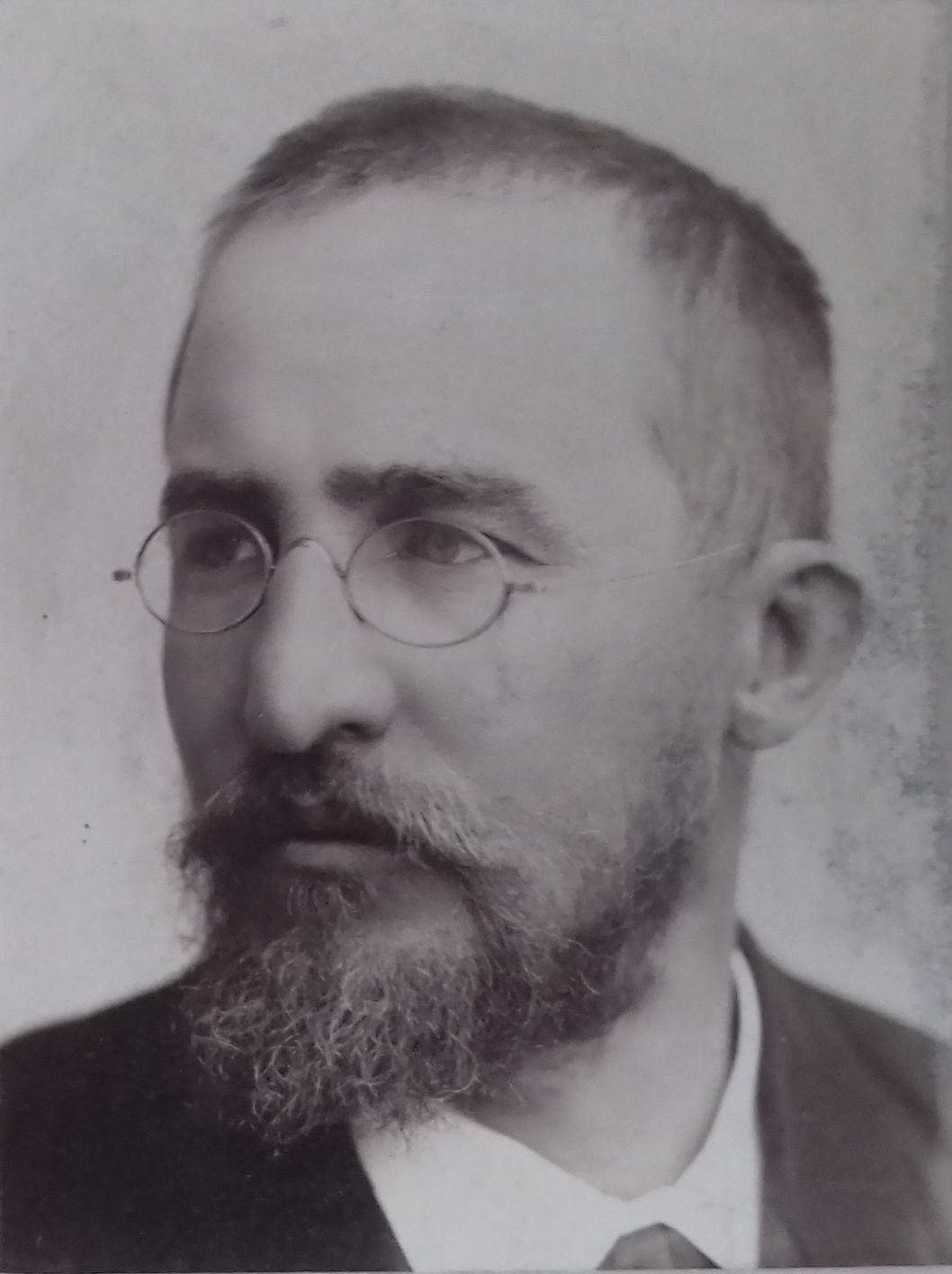
Karel Škorpil

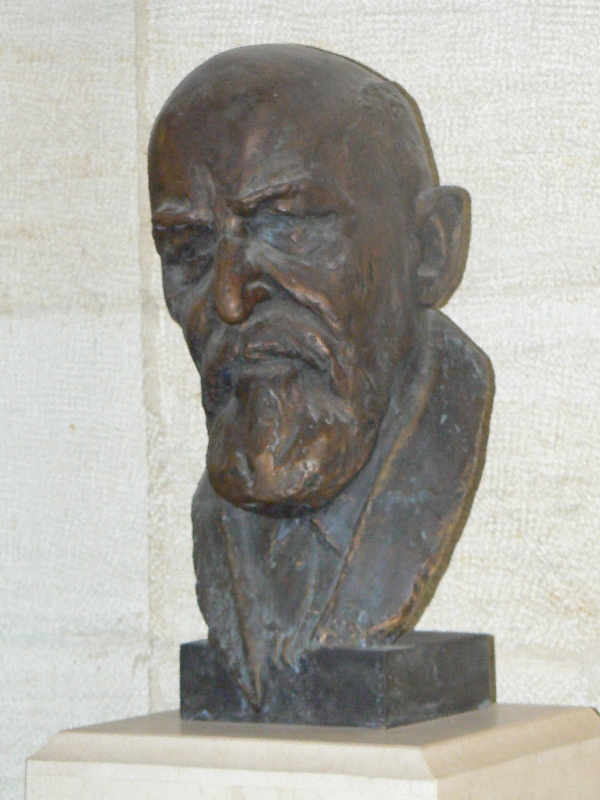
Bust of Karel Škorpil in the Varna Archaeological Museum that he founded

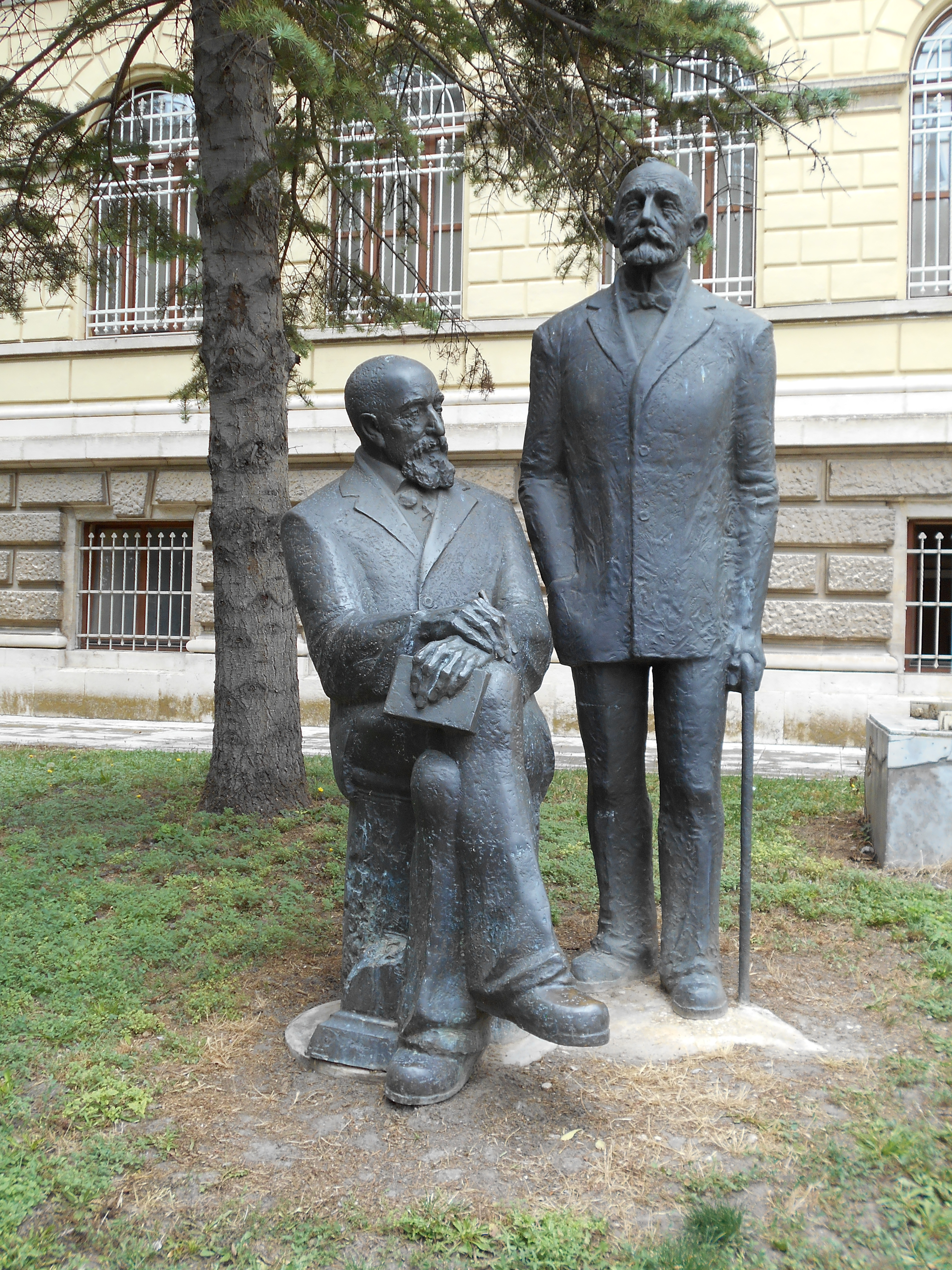
Karel and Hermann Škorpil, Varna Archaeological Museum

Karel Václav Škorpil (Bulgarian: Карел Вацлав Шкорпил; 15 May 1859 – 9 March 1944) was a Czech-Bulgarian archaeologist and museum worker credited along with his brother Hermann with the establishment of those two disciplines in Bulgaria.

== Life ==
Born in the town of Vysoké Mýto in Bohemia, Austria-Hungary (now the Czech Republic) on 15 May 1859, he finished high school in Pardubice before graduating from the Charles University and the Technical University in Prague. In 1881, he moved to what was then Eastern Rumelia (since 1885 united with the Principality of Bulgaria) to work as a high-school teacher in the Bulgarian cities of Plovdiv (1882–1886), Sliven (1886–1888), Varna (1888–1890, 1894–1915) and Veliko Tarnovo (1890–1894). Since 1894, Karel settled permanently in the port city of Varna on the Bulgarian Black Sea Coast, where he founded the Varna Archaeological Society in 1901 and the Varna Archaeological Museum in 1906, of which he was the director from 1915 to his death. He was also a teacher and lecturer at the Naval Academy and the trade school.

As a young teacher, Karel Škorpil came to be interested in archeology. In a career spanning more than 50 years, he published around 150 works, whether as the sole author or in collaboration with his brother, including 30 in German, Russian and Czech, primarily devoted to Bulgaria. He discovered and headed the excavations of the medieval Bulgarian castles at Pliska, Preslav and Madara. He also unearthed the prehistoric stilt houses in Lake Varna, among others. A member of the Bulgarian Academy of Sciences and the Bulgarian Archeological Institute, he died in Varna on 9 March 1944 and was buried among the ruins of the old Bulgarian capital Pliska.

All research by the Škorpil brothers was self-funded, and all unearthed monuments have been preserved in Bulgaria. The street in Varna where their house is located, and the Black Sea village and seaside resort Shkorpilovtsi, were named after the brothers. Škorpil Glacier in Antarctica is named after Karel Škorpil.

== Major works ==
- Monuments across Bulgaria (1888, co-author)
- Mounds (1898, co-author)
- Władysław Warneńczyk (1923, co-author)
- Aboba—Pliska (1905)
- Monuments from the capital Preslav (1930)
