= Hermann Škorpil =

Hermenegild Škorpil
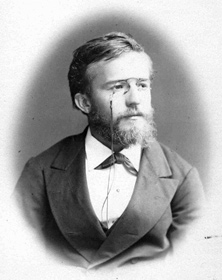
- Hermenegild Škorpil
- Born: 8 February 1858
- Died: 25 June 1923 (aged 65)
- Other names: Hermann Škorpil
- Occupation: Archaeologist

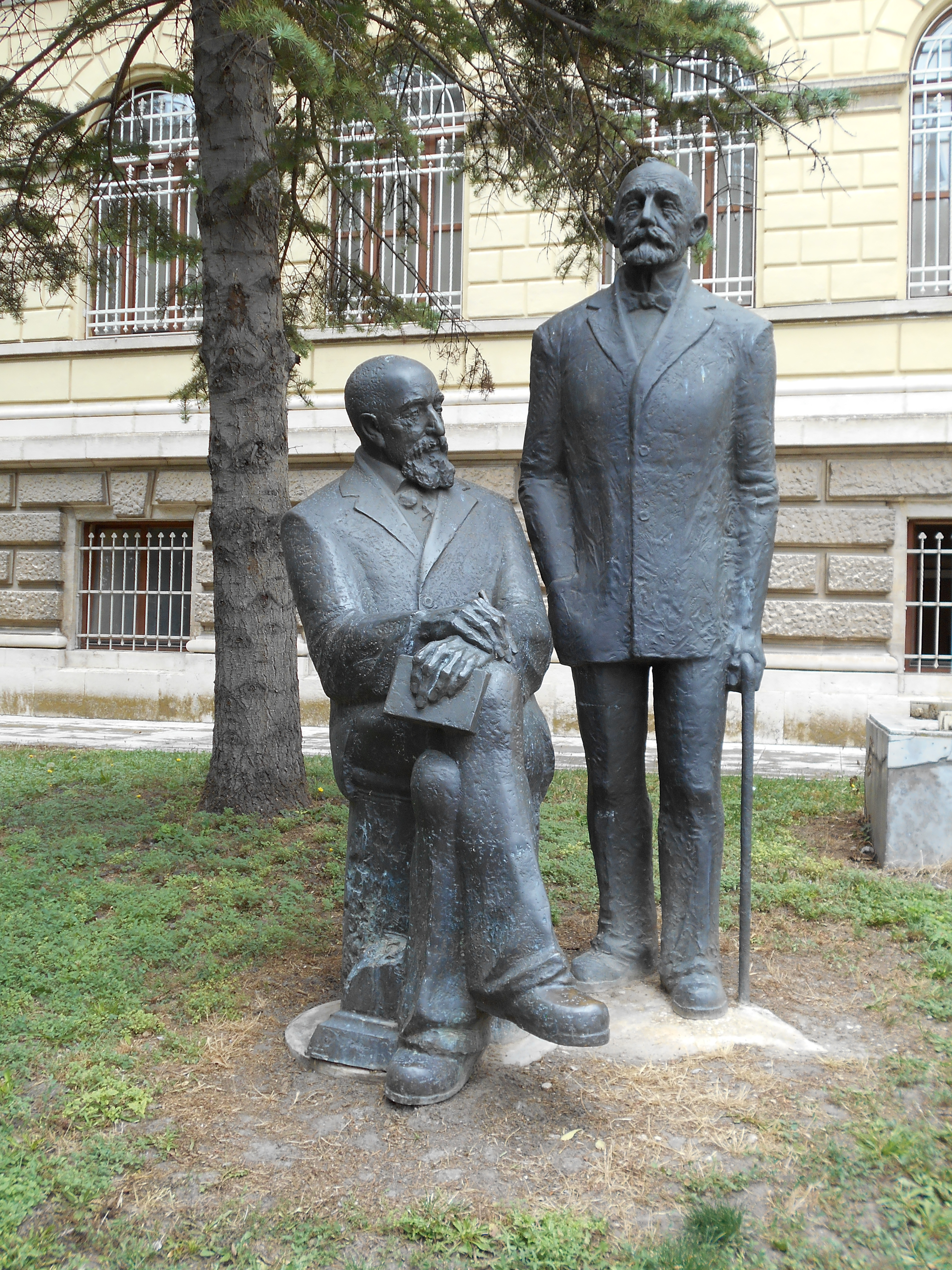
Hermann and Karel Škorpil, Varna Archaeological Museum

Václav Hermenegild Škorpil (Bulgarian: Вацлав Херменгилд Шкорпил; 8 February 1858 – 25 June 1923) was an archaeologist and museum worker credited along with his brother Karel with the establishment of those two disciplines in Bulgaria, as well as a geologist, botanist, architect and librarian.

Born in the city of Vysoké Mýto (then Hohenmauth in the Austrian Empire, now part of Ústí nad Orlicí District, Pardubice Region of the Czech Republic) on 8 February 1858, he finished high school in Chrudim and Pardubice and graduated from the Technical University in Prague and in natural sciences from the University of Leipzig. From 1880 to 1906 he was a teacher at various Bulgarian cities: Plovdiv, Sofia, Sliven, Rousse and Varna, teaching natural history, geography, zoology, botany, arithmetic and the German language. He was the author of the first geological map of Southern Bulgaria. In 1884, he founded a museum in Sliven, as well as a museum of natural sciences in Rousse in 1902. From 1906 to his death, he was the curator of the Varna Archaeological Museum. He died in the city where he spent much of his life with his brother, the Bulgarian Black Sea Coast port of Varna, on 25 June 1923. He was buried in an area near the city where he had unearthed an early Christian basilica.

All research by the Škorpil brothers was self-funded and all unearthed monuments have been preserved in Bulgaria. A street in Varna where their house is located and the Black Sea village and seaside resort Shkorpilovtsi were named after the brothers. Their hometown Vysoké Mýto is also a twin town of Varna.

== Major works ==
- Monuments across Bulgaria (1888, co-author)
- Primitive people in Bulgaria (1896)
- Mounds (1898, co-author)
- Władysław Warneńczyk (1923, co-author)
