= Dolni Chiflik =

Dolni Chiflik Долни чифлик
- Location of Dolni Chiflik
- Coordinates: 42°59′N 27°43′E
- Country: Bulgaria
- Provinces (Oblast): Varna

Government
  - Mayor: Krasimira Anastasova
- Elevation: 45 m (148 ft)

Population (December 2009)
  - Total: 6,706
- Time zone: UTC+2 (EET)
  - Summer (DST): UTC+3 (EEST)
- Postal Code: 9120
- Area code: 05142
- License plate: B

Dolni Chiflik (Bulgarian: Долни чифлик [ˈdɔɫni t͡ʃifˈlik], lit. 'lower farm', Turkish: Aşağı Çiftlik) is a town in northeastern Bulgaria, part of Varna Province, located near the Kamchiya River about 14 km away from the Black Sea coast. It is the administrative centre of the homonymous Dolni Chiflik Municipality. As of December 2009, the town had a population of 6,706.

== History ==
The village of Dolni Chiflik was founded by an Ottoman noble after the Christian defeat in the Battle of Varna in 1444. In the village's early years, the main occupation of the locals was stockbreeding. In 1795, the village was burned to the ground by the Circassians, and was uninhabited until the following year, when Mihail Yanev and his family settled, with more Bulgarians coming in 1830.

Dolni Chiflik first became a municipality centre in 1919. It was proclaimed a town on 4 September 1974 and renamed Kamchiya (after the river). In early 1975, upon the death of the politician Georgi Traykov, it was named in his honour. After 10 November 1989, President Zhelyu Zhelev reinstated the old name Dolni Chiflik.
