= Resort of Kamchiya =

Resort Complex Kamchia Курортен Комплекс Камчия
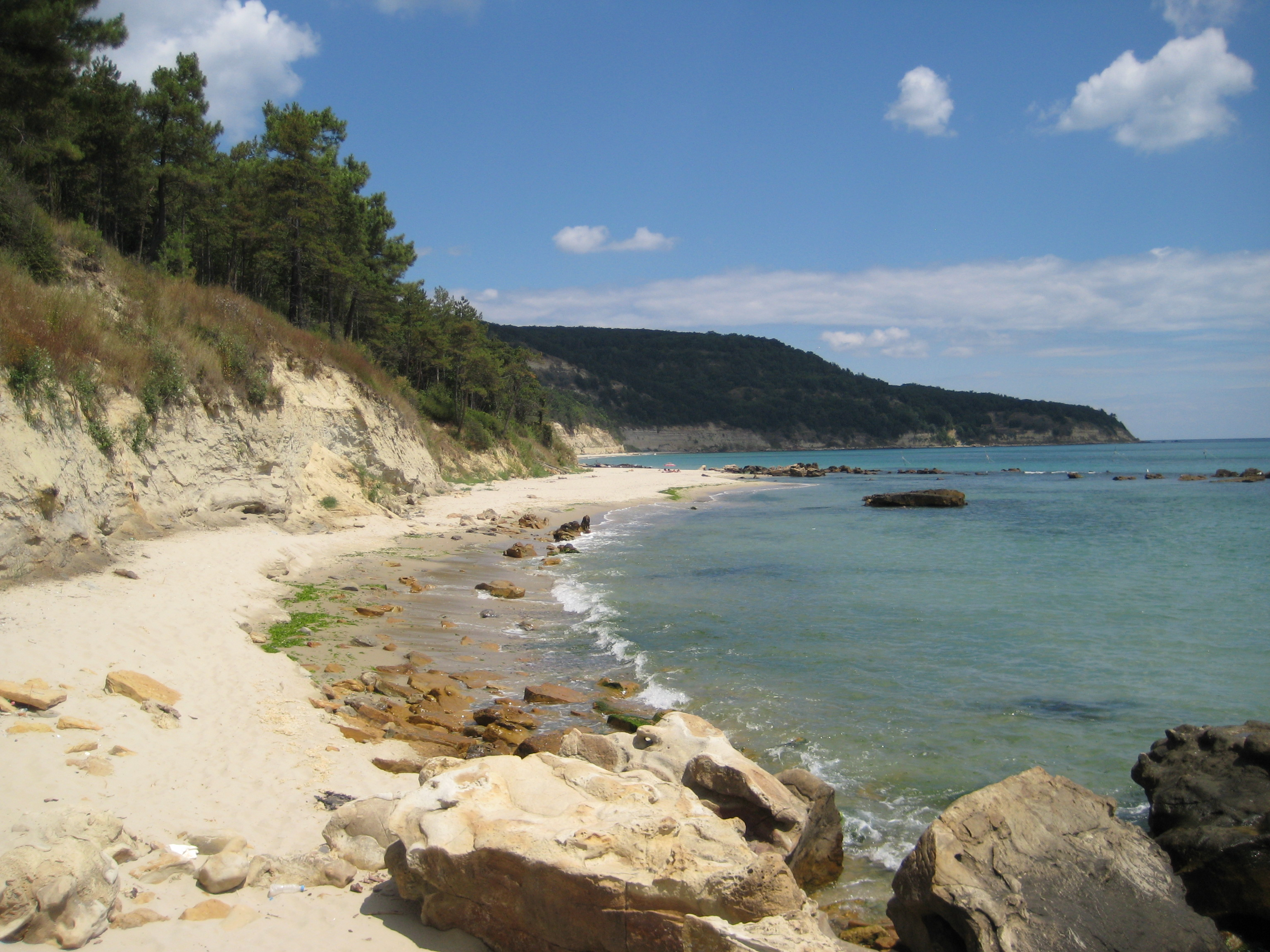
- The Cliffs of Kamchia

- Location of Kamchiya (Resort)
- Coordinates: 43°01′59.63″N 27°53′00.27″E
- Country: Bulgaria
- Provinces (Oblast): Kamchiya
- Time zone: UTC+2 (EET)
  - Summer (DST): UTC+3 (EEST)

The Resort Complex of Kamchia, (Bulgarian Курортен Комплекс Камчия), is a Black Sea coastal resort on the northern length of the coast of Bulgaria. It is located 25 km south of the Provincial Centre of Varna in the municipality of Avren and lies north of the mouth of the river Kamchia. It is mainly made up of "rest bases", (Bulgarian, Почивни Бази) which are mini-resorts made up of individual villas and bungalows. There is also a functioning fishing village, and the remains of a military outpost, (now defunct). The resort has a transitional population which only remains for the summer season beginning in May and finishes at the end of September.

== History ==
It was most built during the period in which Bulgaria was communist, (although there used to be a village beforehand). Many of the 'rest bases' (Bulgarian почивни станции) would have originally been national institutions, most of which would have been run by individual ministries, (for example the Transport-Constructional Army had a base). Today, although some of the rest bases have been retained by the government, most are owned by private concessionaires while the standard of the sub-complexes ranges from relatively low to high.

== Gallery ==
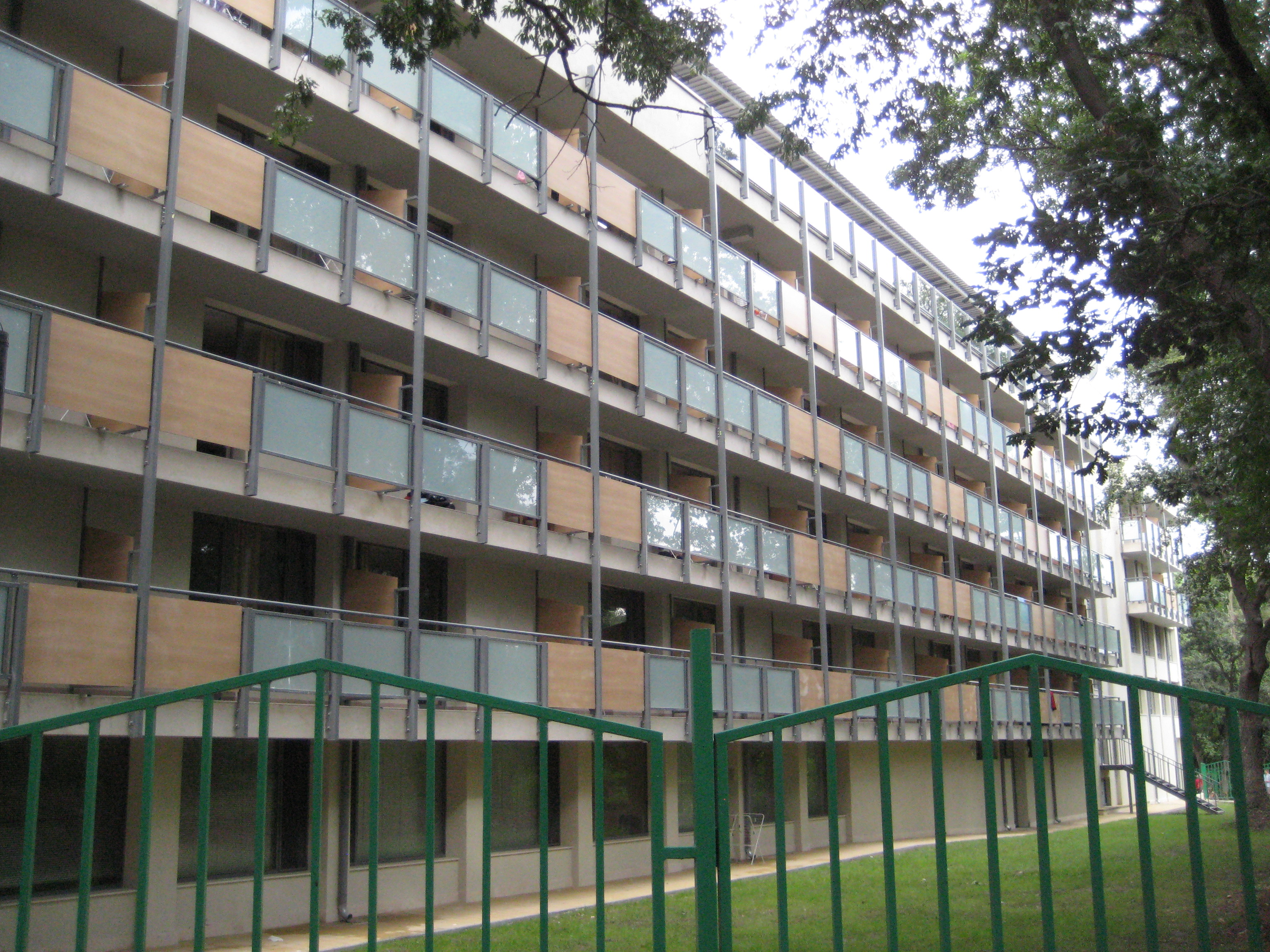
Russian owned Hotel Longose

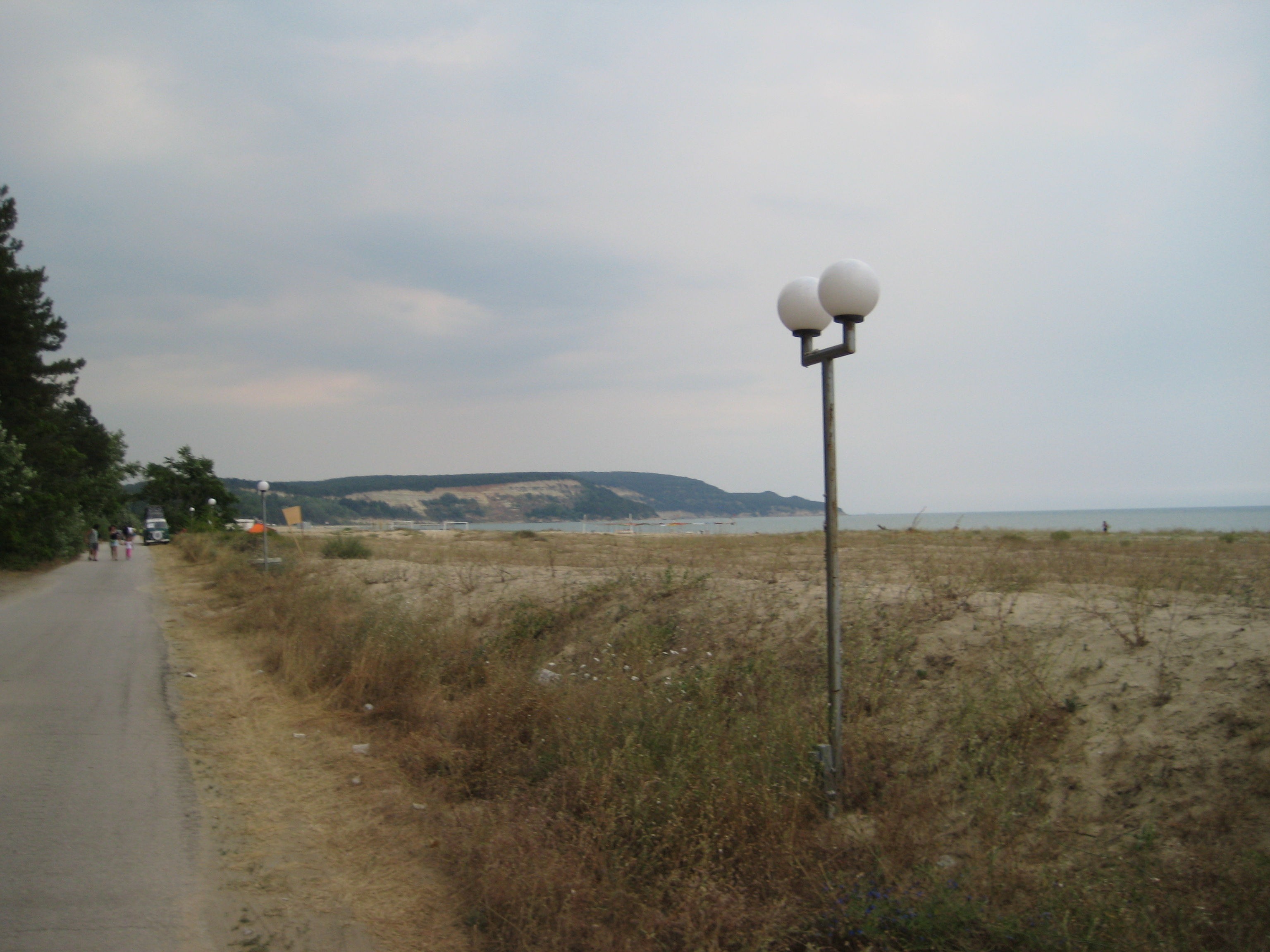
Concrete walk along the beach line.

== See also ==
- Kamchia (disambiguation)
