= Shkorpilovtsi =

Shkorpilovtsi Шкорпиловци
- Village
- Location in Bulgaria
- Coordinates: 42.963°N 27.878°E
- Country: Bulgaria
- Province: Varna Province
- Municipality: Dolni Chiflik Municipality
- Elevation: 23 m (75 ft)

Population (2015-09-15)
  - Total: 774
- Postal code: 9112

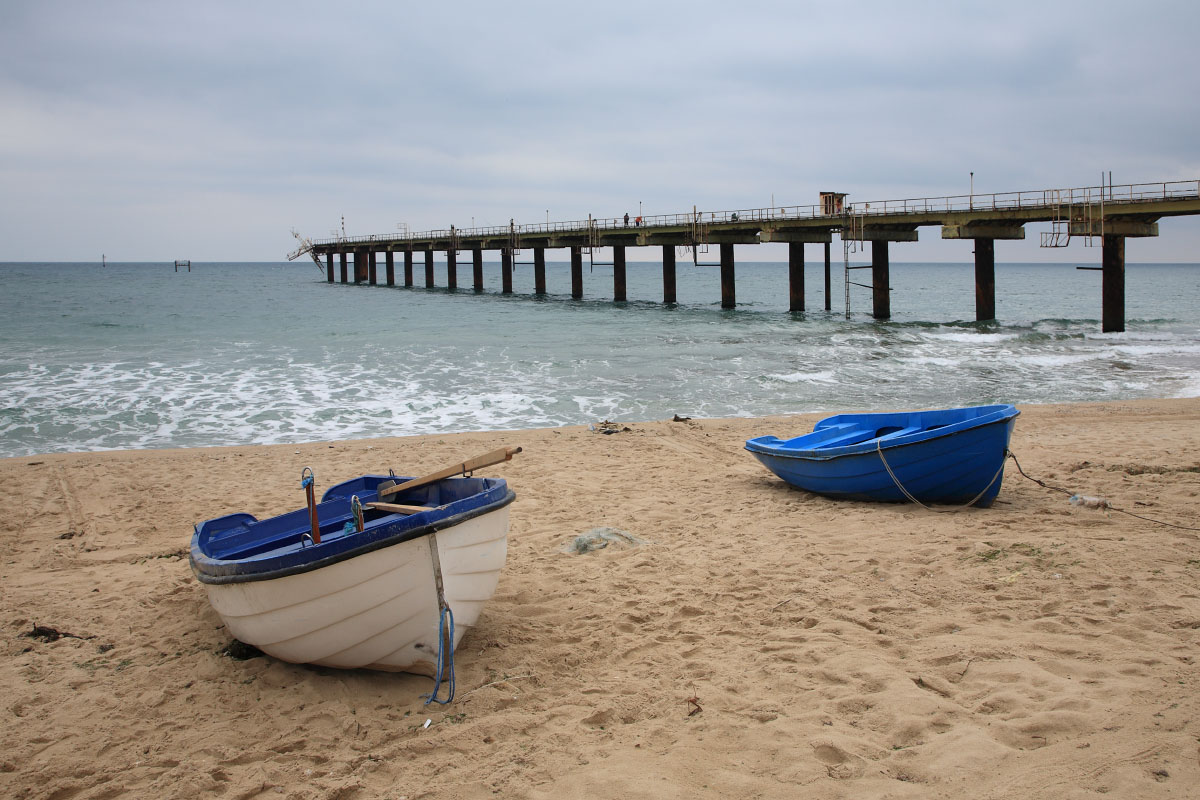
The Shkorpilovtsi beach and forebridge.

Shkorpilovtsi (Bulgarian: Шкорпиловци) is a small village and sea resort in Dolni Chiflik Municipality on the Bulgarian Black Sea Coast, located only 100 m away from one of the beaches on the Moesian Black Sea Coast. Its proximity to the sea capital of Bulgaria, Varna, makes it a preferred holiday destination for many Bulgarian and foreign tourists.

The resort was named after the Czech–Bulgarian archaeologist brothers Karel and Hermann Škorpil, long-time citizens of Varna.
