= Varna Archaeological Museum =

Museum in Bulgaria

Coordinates: 43°12′27″N 27°54′54″E

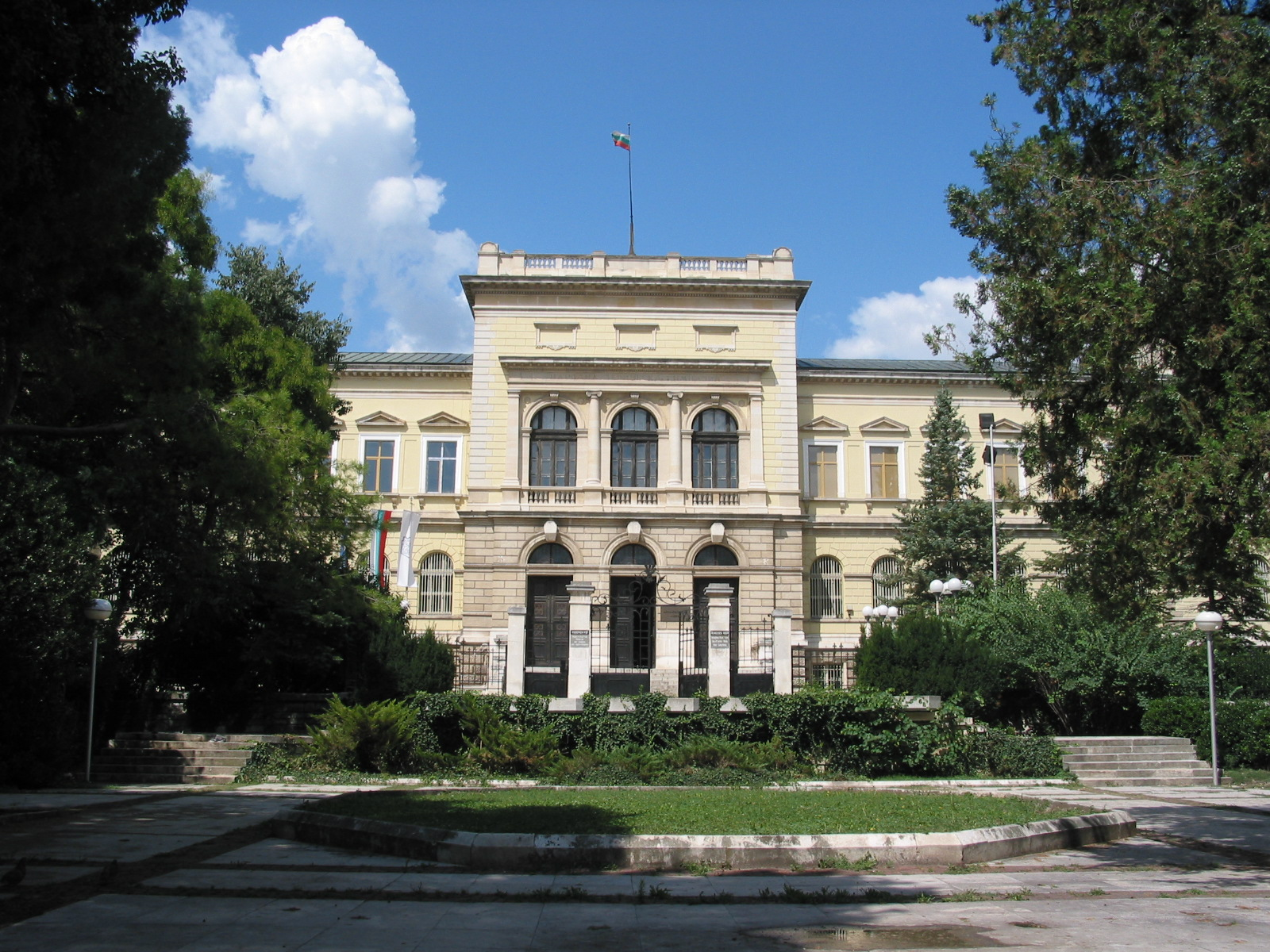
The Museum's main facade

The Varna Archaeological Museum (Bulgarian: Варненски археологически музей, Varnenski arheologicheski muzey) is an archaeological museum in the city of Varna on the Black Sea coast of Bulgaria.

Founded on 3 June 1888, when a museum, part of the City Library was established, the Varna Archaeological Museum is situated in a historic building designed in the Neo-Renaissance style by the noted architect Petko Momchilov and built in 1892–1898 for the Varna Girls' School. It became state property in 1945, and since 1993 the museum has occupied the entire building, parts of which it had been using since 1895.

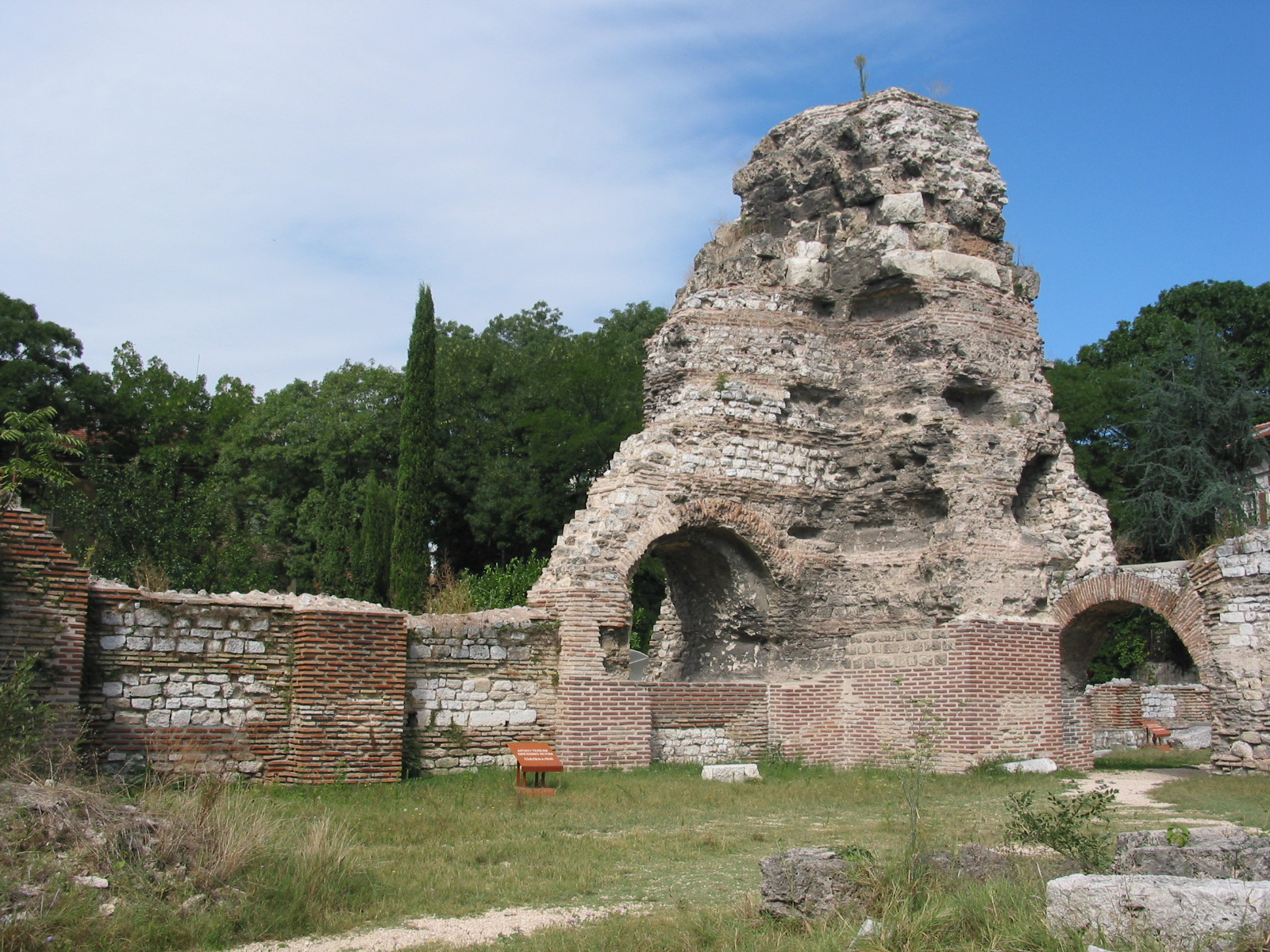
Roman baths

One of the largest museums in Bulgaria, it has 2,150 m^{2} of exhibition area with exhibits from the prehistoric, Thracian, Ancient Greek and Ancient Roman periods of the region's history, as well as from the times of the medieval Bulgarian and Byzantine Empires, Ottoman rule and the Bulgarian National Revival (including about 900 medieval and Revival icons).

The Museum's arguably most celebrated exhibit is the Gold of Varna, the oldest gold treasure in the world, excavated in 1972 and dating to 4600-4200 BCE, which occupies three separate exhibition halls.

The museum also manages two open-air archaeological sites, the large Roman baths in the city centre and the medieval grotto of Aladzha Monastery at Golden Sands Nature Park.

Four other sites are undergoing conservation and will be added to the museum roster: the 4th-5th-century episcopal basilica on Khan Krum Street; the basilica and monastery of the same period at Dzhanavara; the 9th-10th-century Theotokos monastery and scriptorium of the Preslav Literary School at Pchelina; and the Mediaeval fortified settlement of Kastritsi at Euxinograd.

The museum has also a library, a children's study museum, a gift shop, and a cafeteria. Its courtyard lapidarium hosts the annual Varna Summer International Jazz Festival.

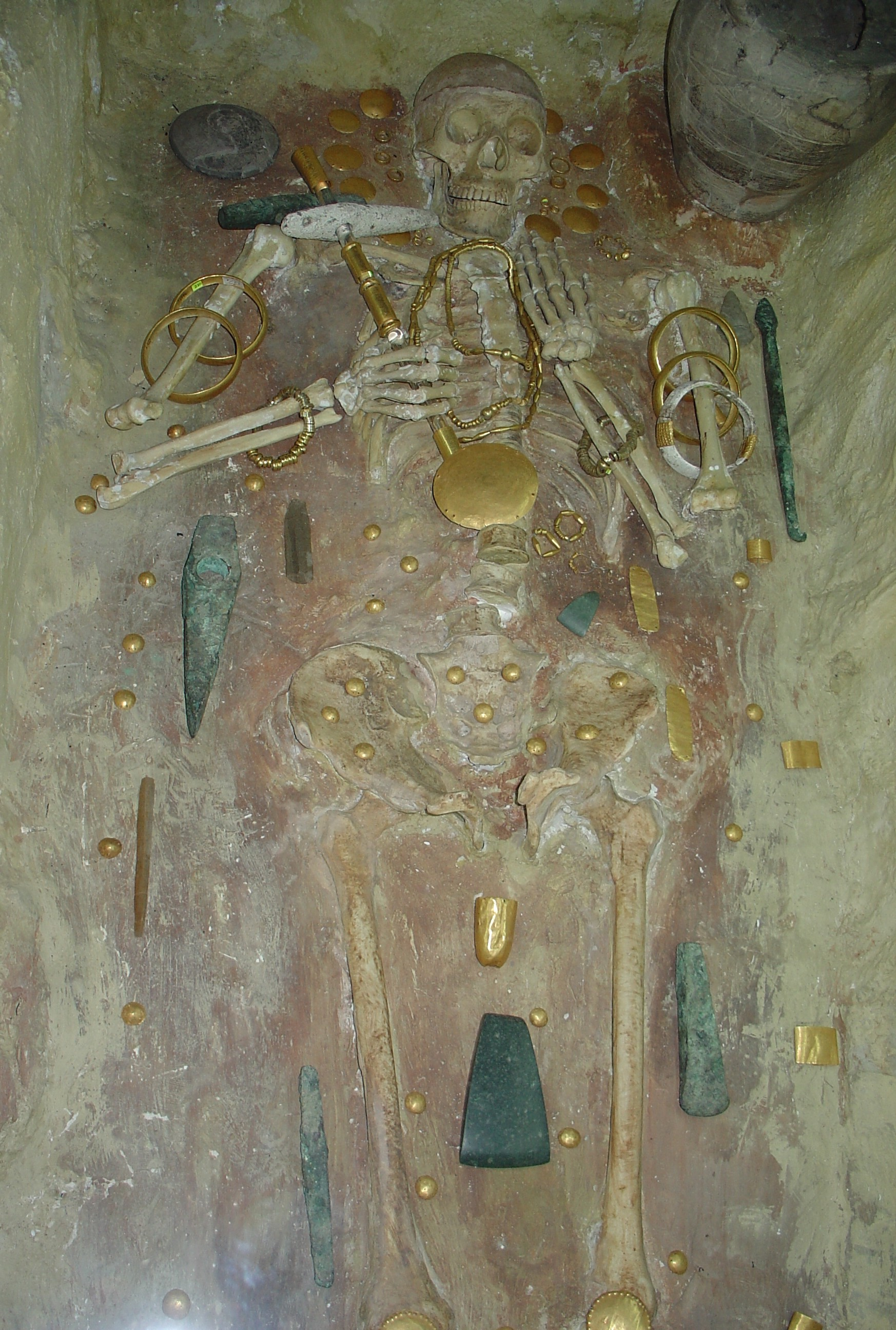

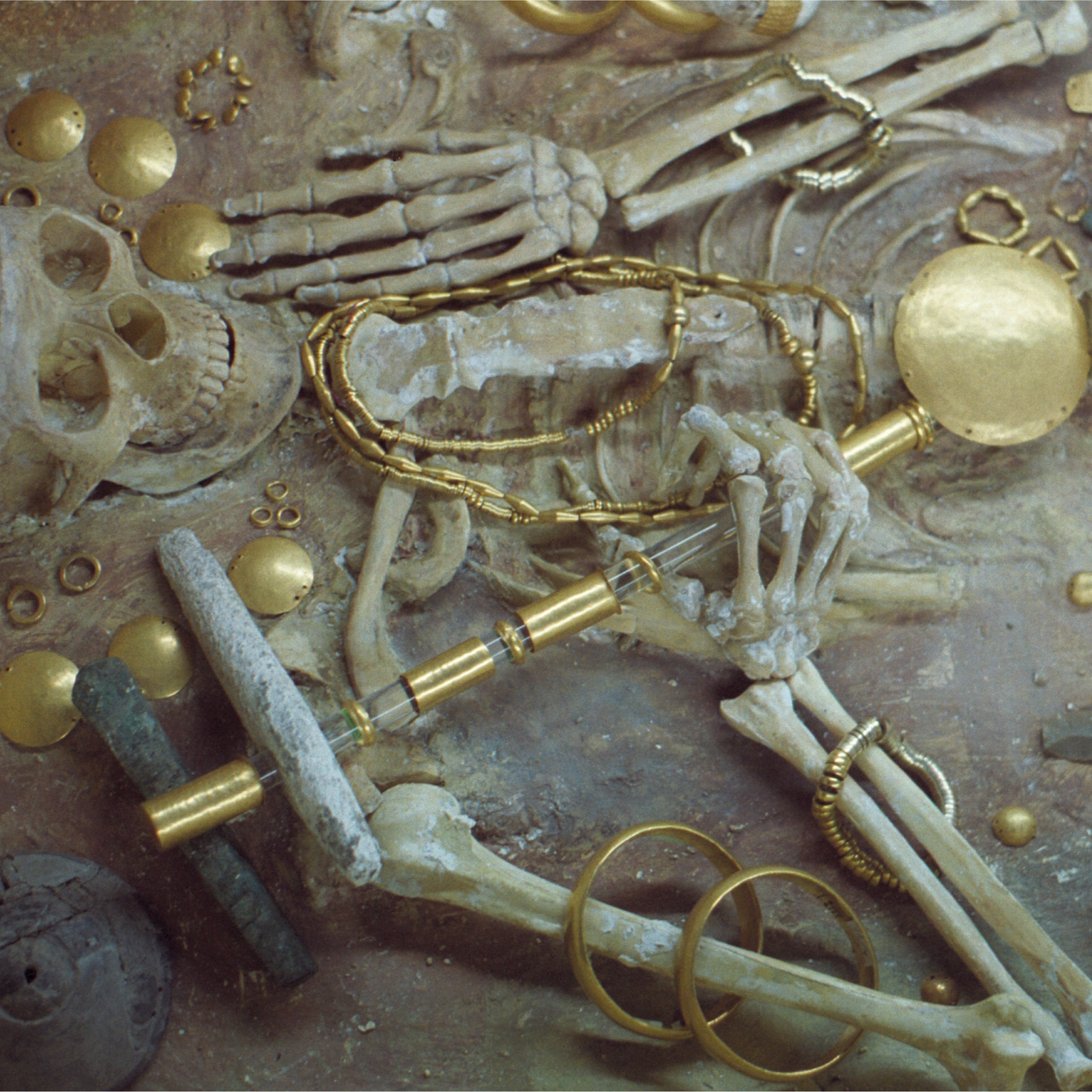
Burial with gold treasure, 4600-4200 BCE

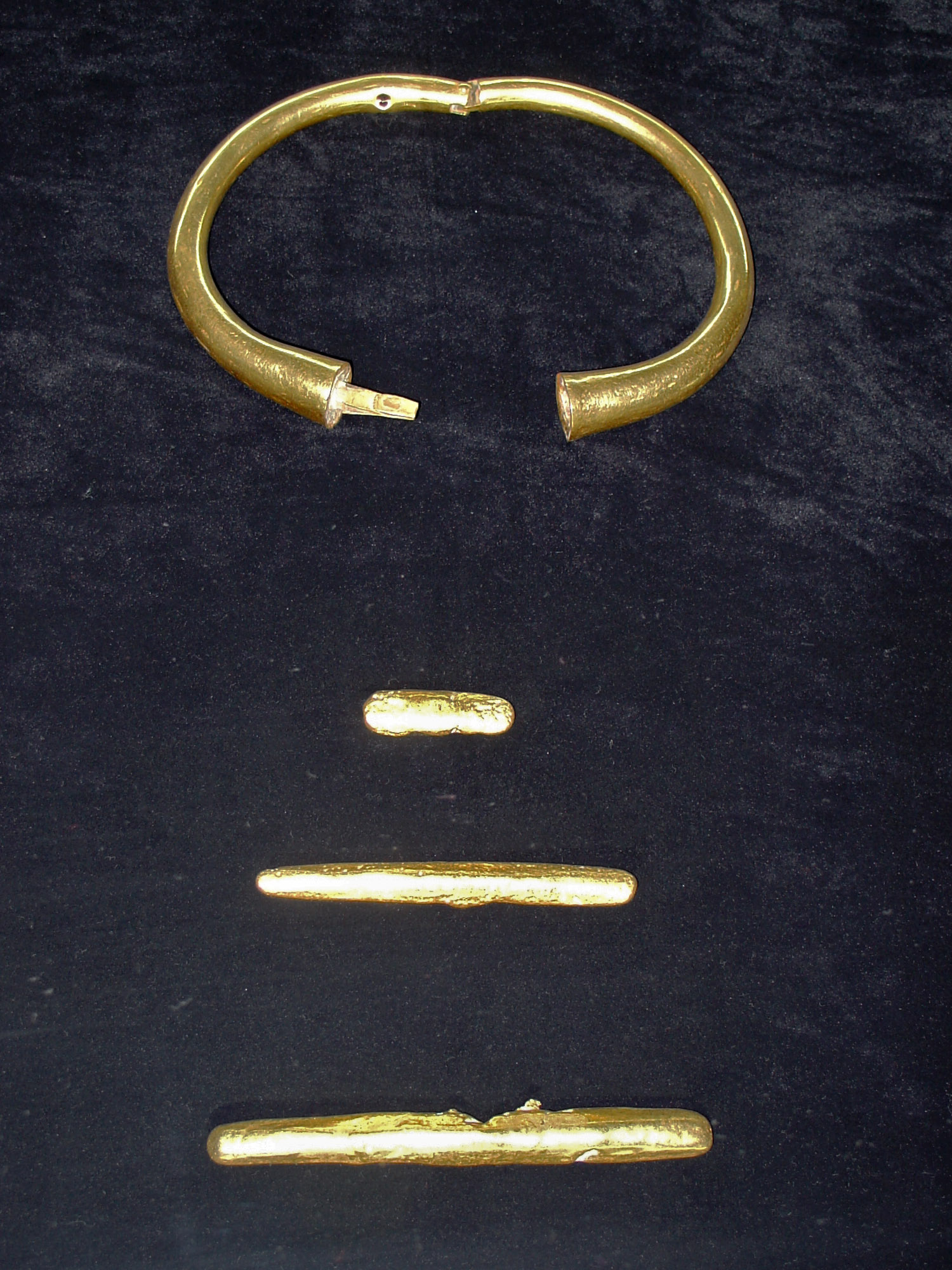

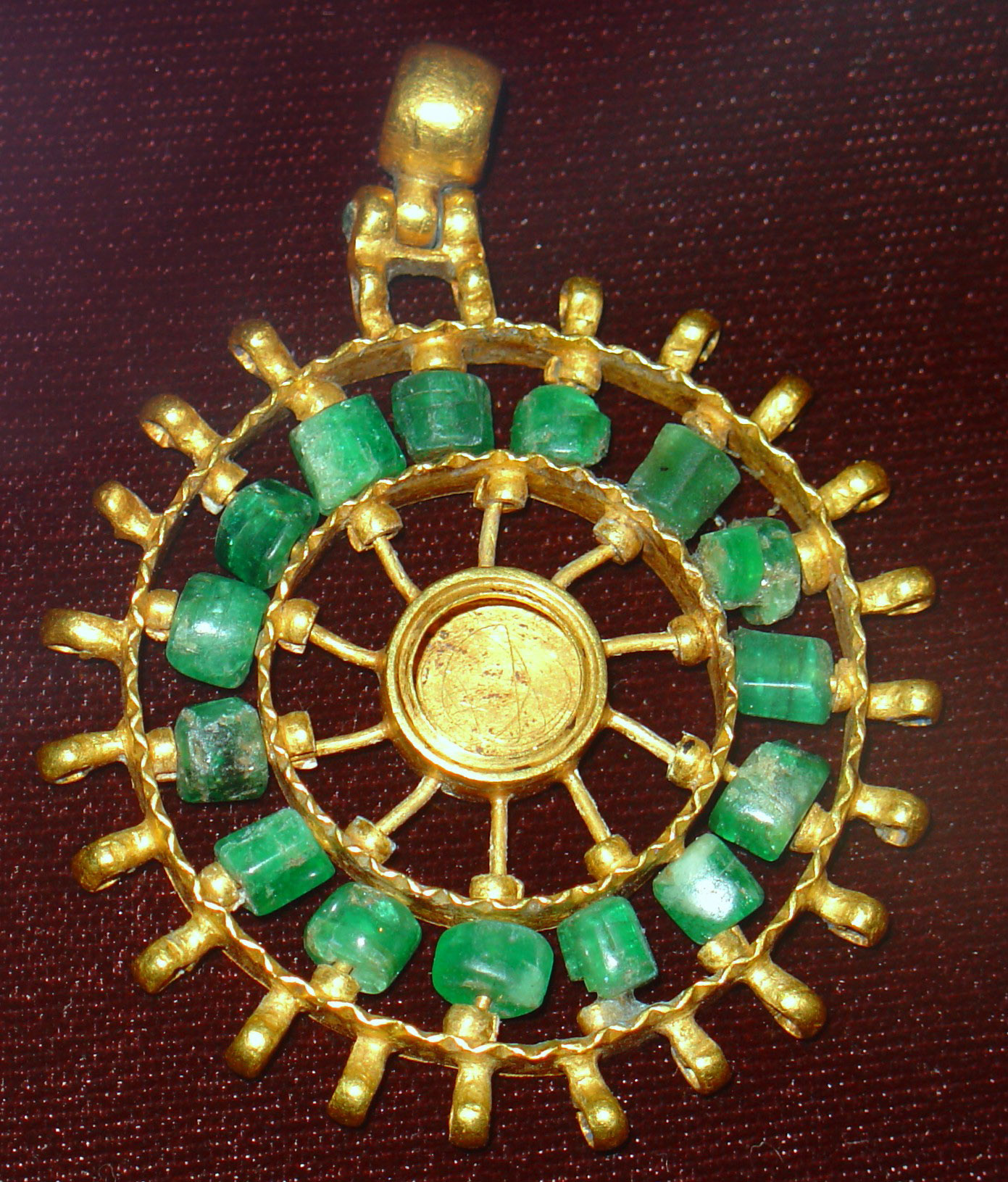

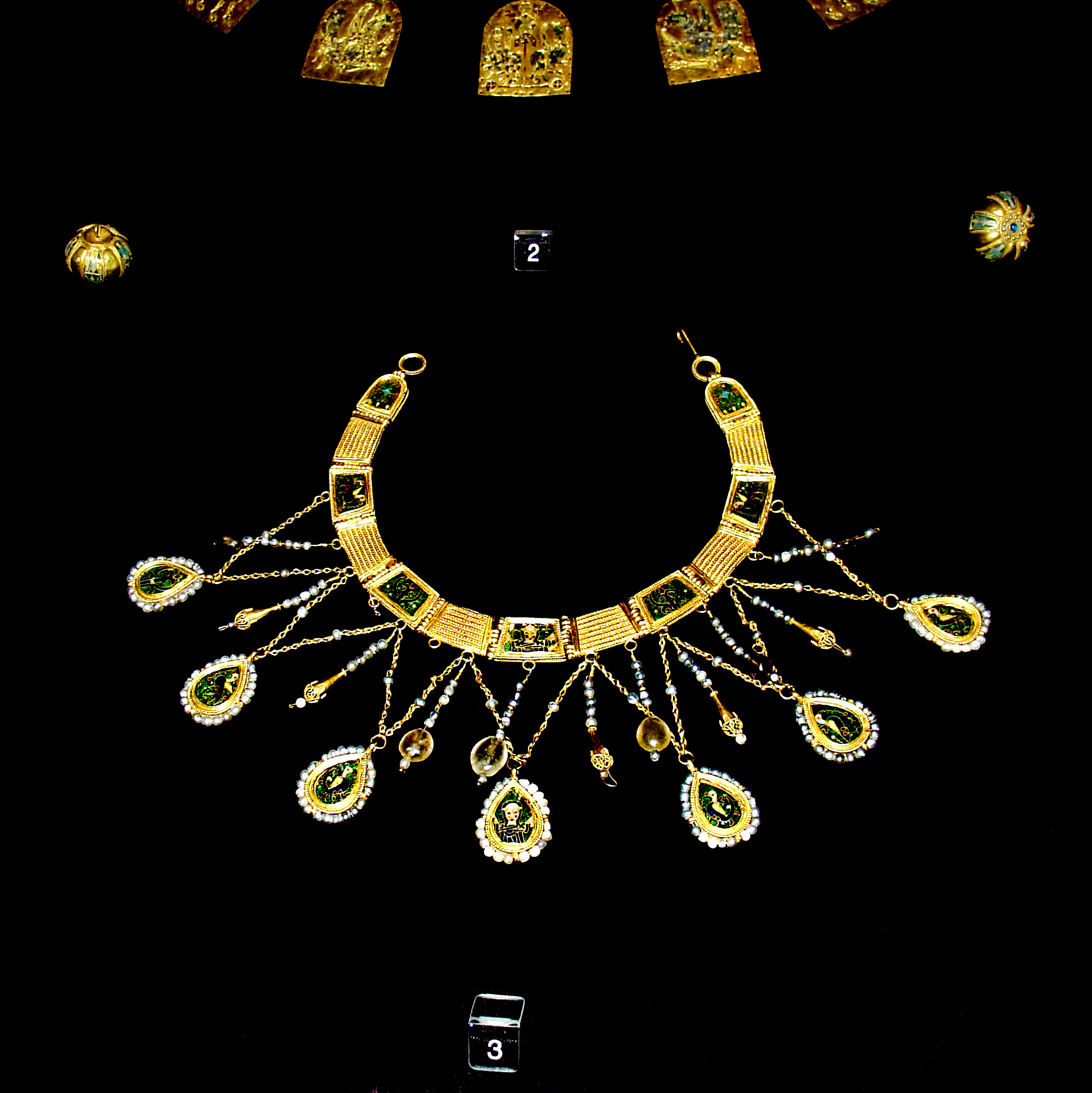

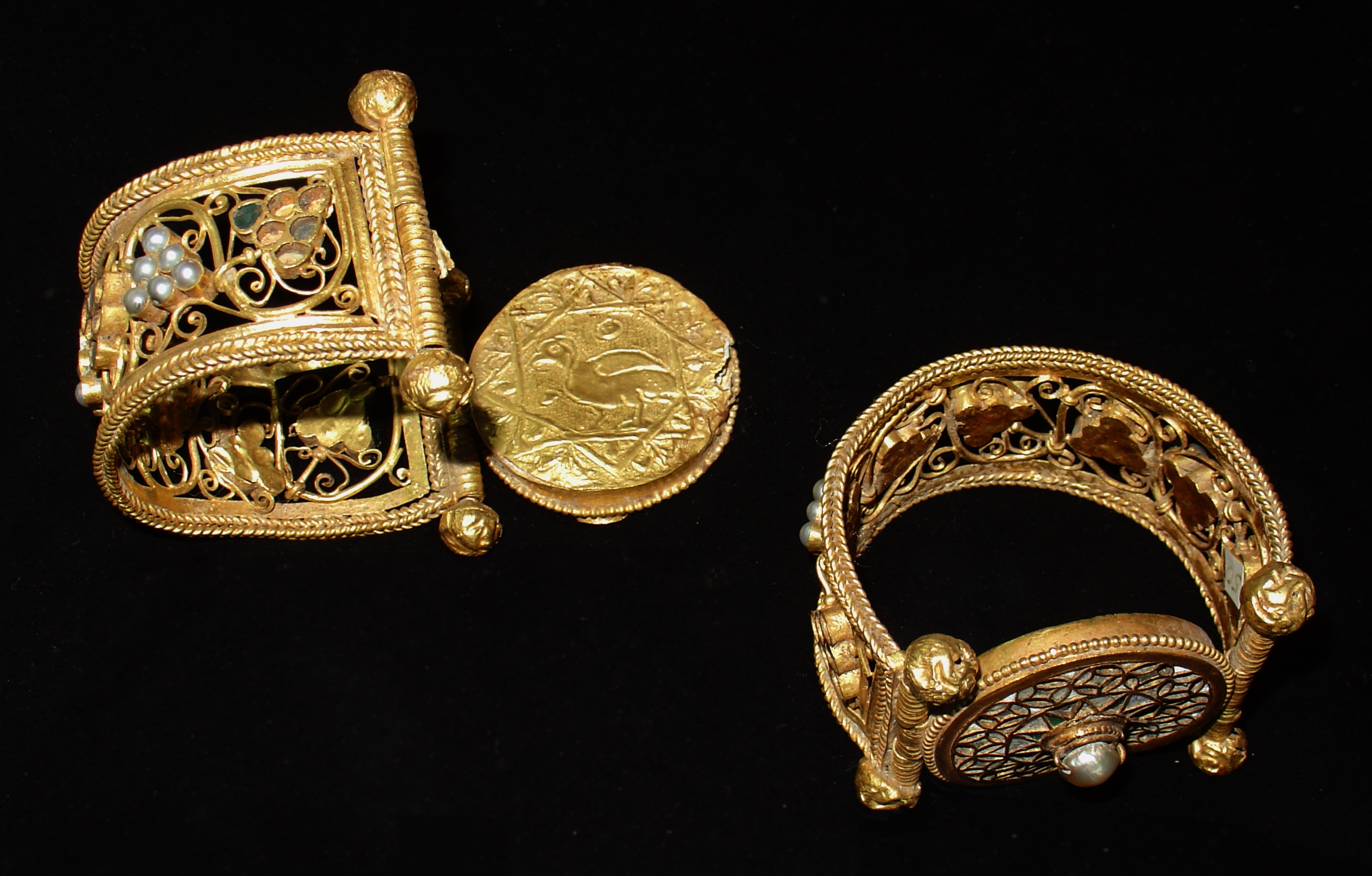

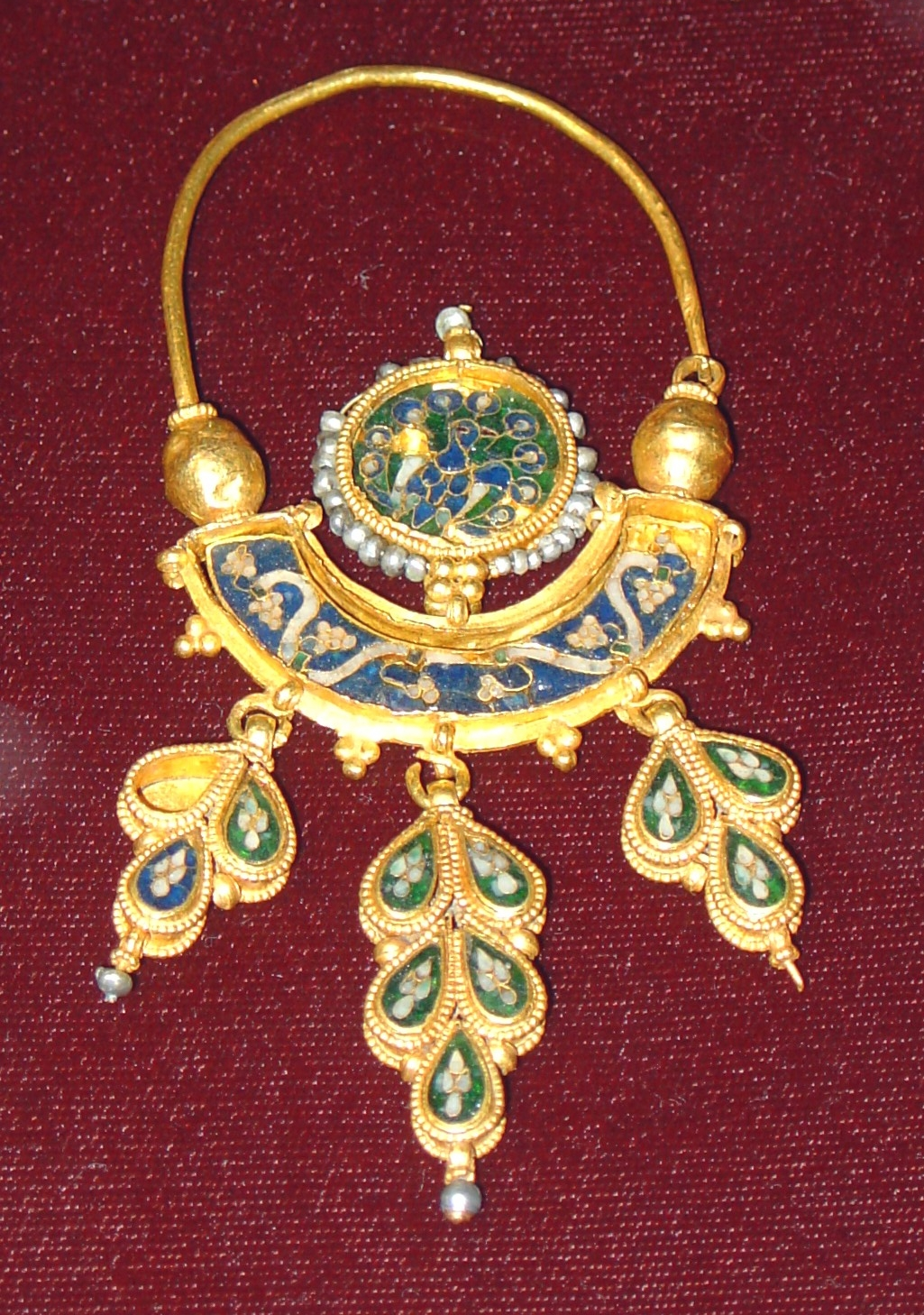

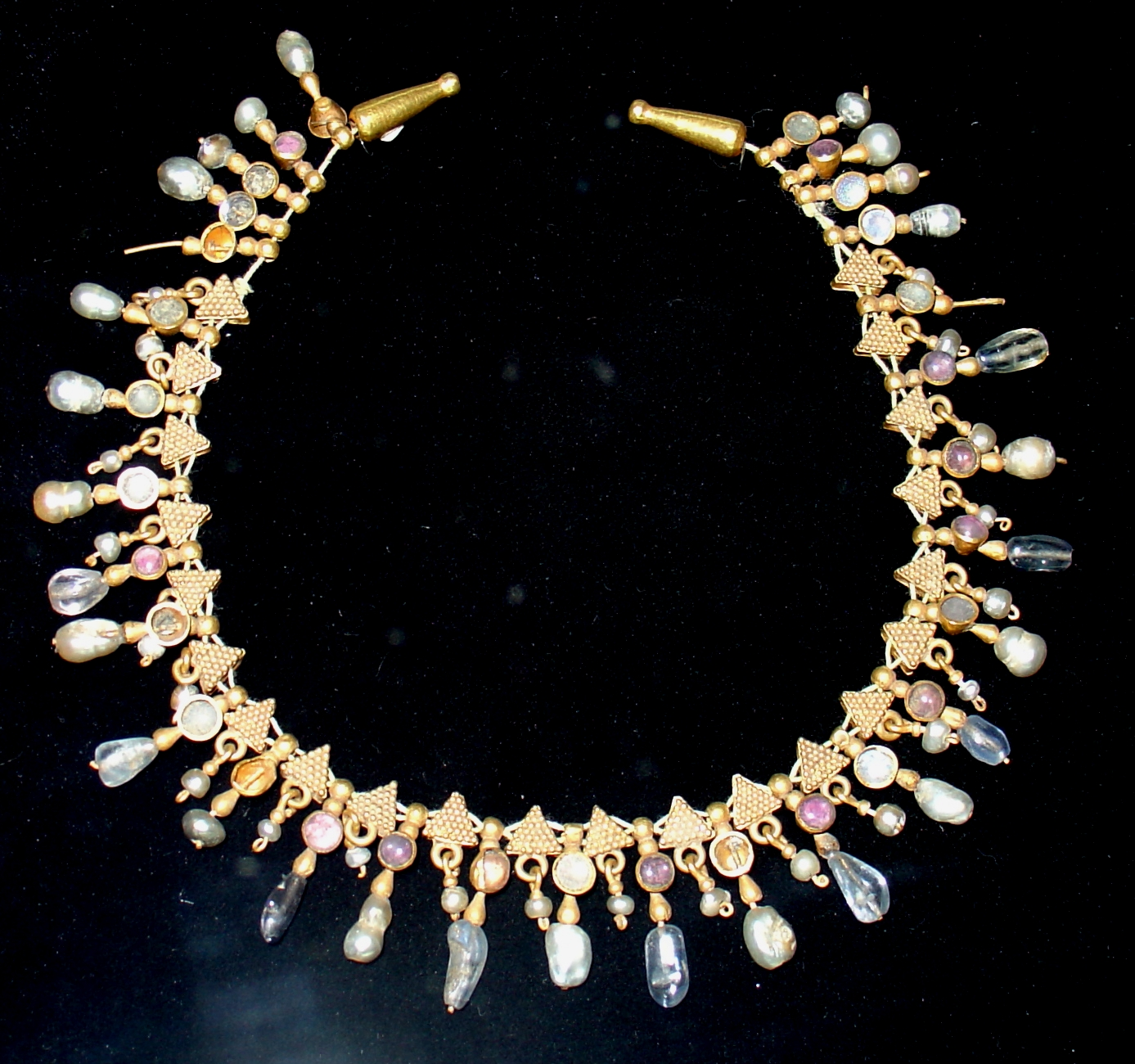

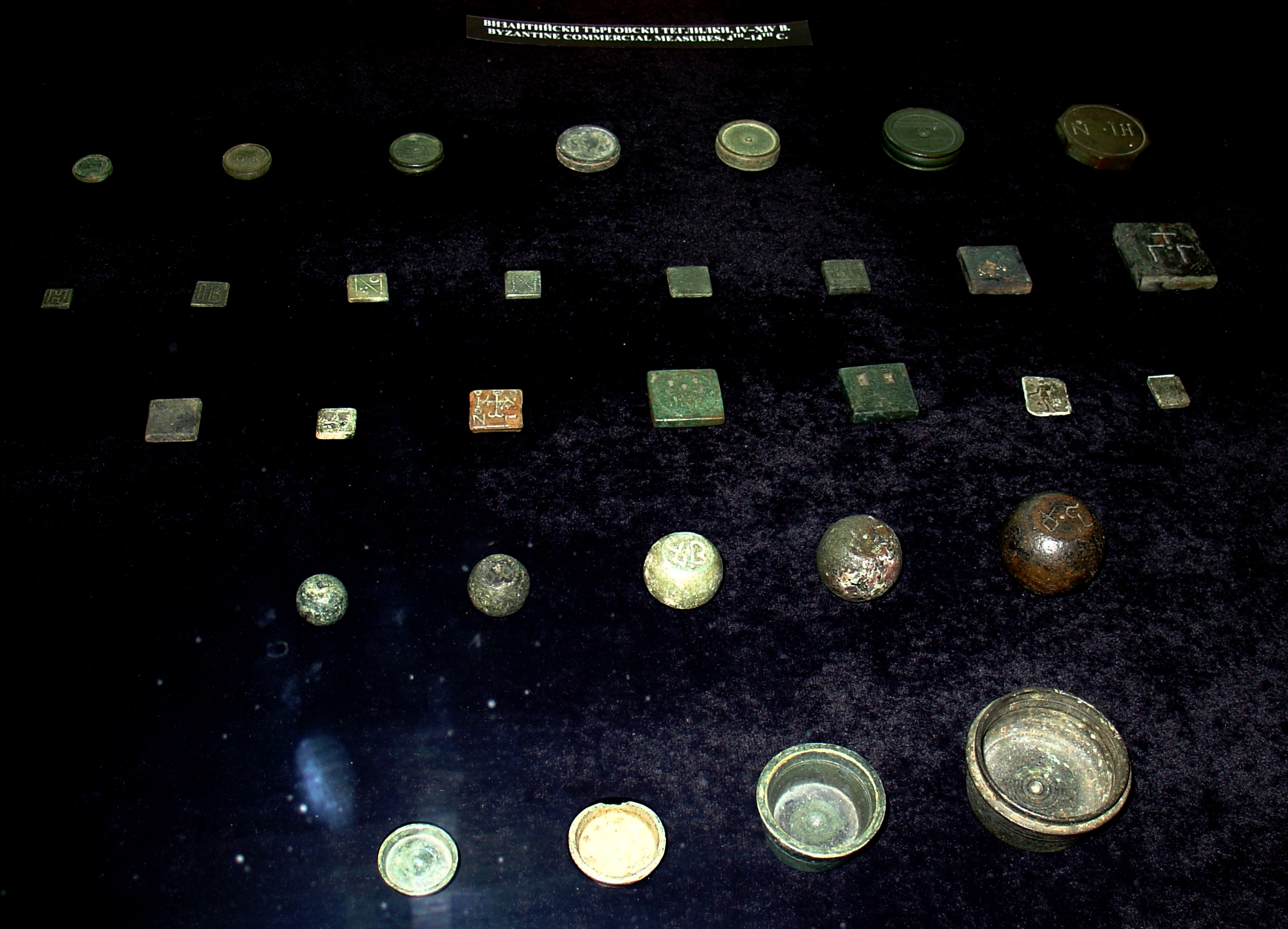

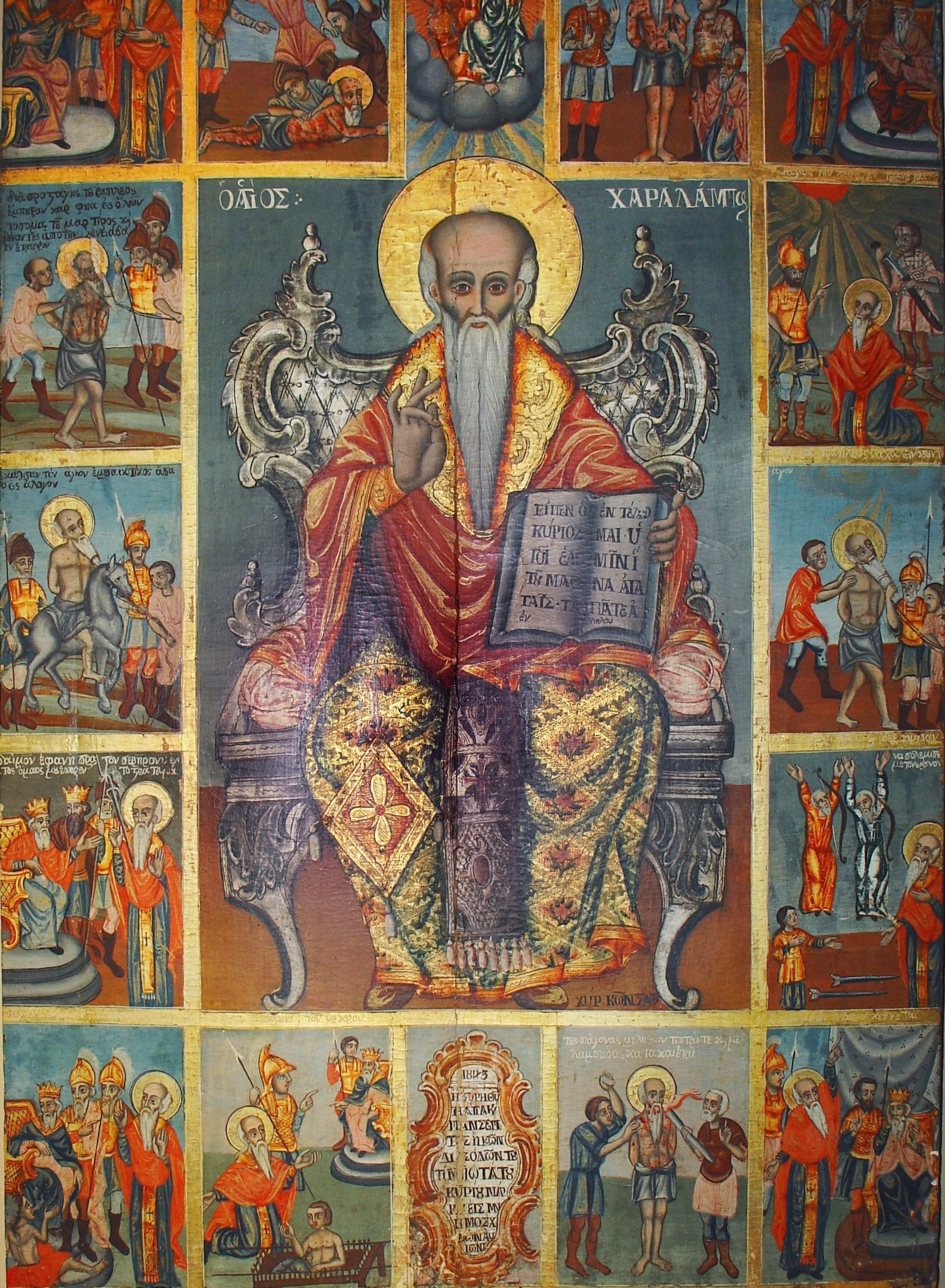

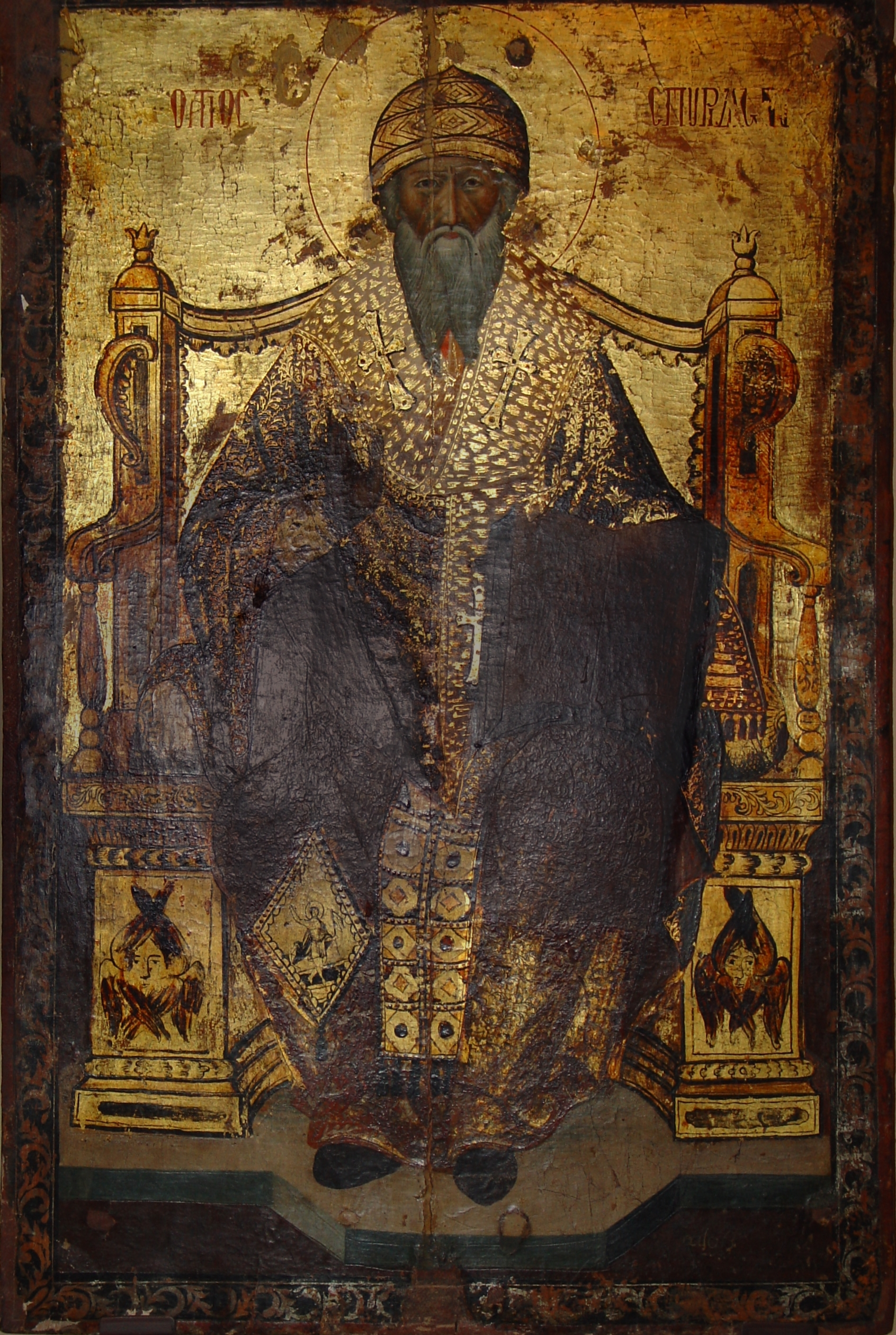
