= Kamchiya =

Kamchiya (Камчия)
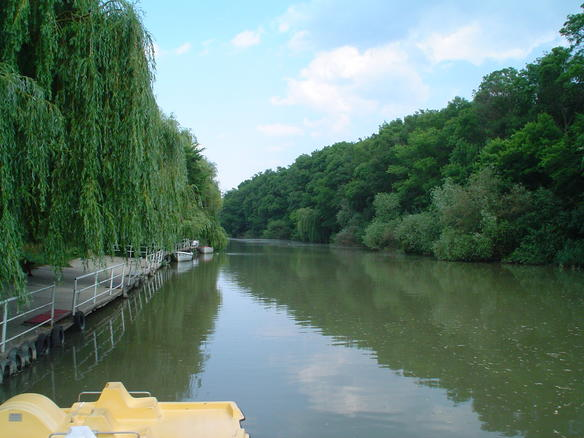
- Kamchiya

Location
- Country: Bulgaria

Physical characteristics
- Source
  - location: Bulgaria
  - elevation: 710 m (2,330 ft)
- Mouth
  - location: Black Sea, 25 km (16 mi) south of Varna
  - coordinates: 43.0222°N 27.8891°E
- Length: 190.7 km (118.5 mi)/total length (244.5-kilometre (151.9 mi) from ligeras source
- Basin size: 5,363 km^{2} (2,071 sq mi)
- Discharge
  - average: from 1.136 m^{3}/s (40.1 cu ft/s) at the village of Ticha to 26.287 m^{3}/s (928.3 cu ft/s) at the mouth

Video 2008

The Kamchiya (also Kamchia and Kamčija, Bulgarian: Камчия [ˈkamt͡ʃijɐ]) is a 191-kilometre (119 mi) river in eastern Bulgaria. From its longest source, Golyama Kamchiya (Big Kamchiya), it has a total length of (244.5-kilometre (151.9 mi). The river Kamchiya proper starts from the confluence of the two rivers springing from Eastern Stara Planina, Golyama Kamchiya (itself formed by the confluence of the rivers Ticha and Vrana) and Luda Kamchiya (considered major source), flows eastward to the Black Sea and empties into it 25 km south of Varna, in the Resort of Kamchiya.

== History ==
In antiquity, the river was known as Panisos; later, Slavs gave it the name of Ticha. Its contemporary name is considered to be of Cuman origin. The Romans built the stronghold Erite on its bank. The Kamchia basin played a notable role in the history of the First Bulgarian Empire. Much of the Medieval Bulgarian Navy from the 9th to the 14th century was built at the river mouth thanks to the quality timber of the area. In the 18th century, Lipovans settled along the lower banks.

== Geography and ecology ==
Running down through Eastern Stara Planina, the Kamchiya meanders through the Longoz or alluvial longose grove, and through the Kamchia (biosphere reserve), a UNESCO-listed biosphere reserve protecting the primeval forest from intensive logging and drainage that had decimated it by mid-20th century. The river mouth forms a sand barrier and often overflows its banks in the valley. The old synclines of the river leave swampy areas called azmatsi. The reserve is 40 km long (stretching throughout the longose grove to the river mouth) and up to 5 km wide.

The area around the river mouth is remarkable for its (frequently flooded) old growth forests of a riverine type, up to 450 meter-wide beaches with up to 19 meter-high banks, forested or grass-covered sand dunes, freshwater marshes, and marshy remnants of old riverbeds, cutting deep into the forest. The unusual coexistence of ash, oak, elm, alder and maple trees, sometimes rising up to 40–50 m with lianas climbing among the branches, creates the impression of a tropical forest, a real tangle of woods. The summer snowflake (Leucojum aestivum) and several buttercup species (Scilla sp.), as well as ferns, grow in the river delta. One can see otter, deer, wild boar and wild cats among the 26 mammal species. There are ospreys, eagles, and up to 200 other bird species, including 56 protected ones, and 25 fish species, among other wildlife.

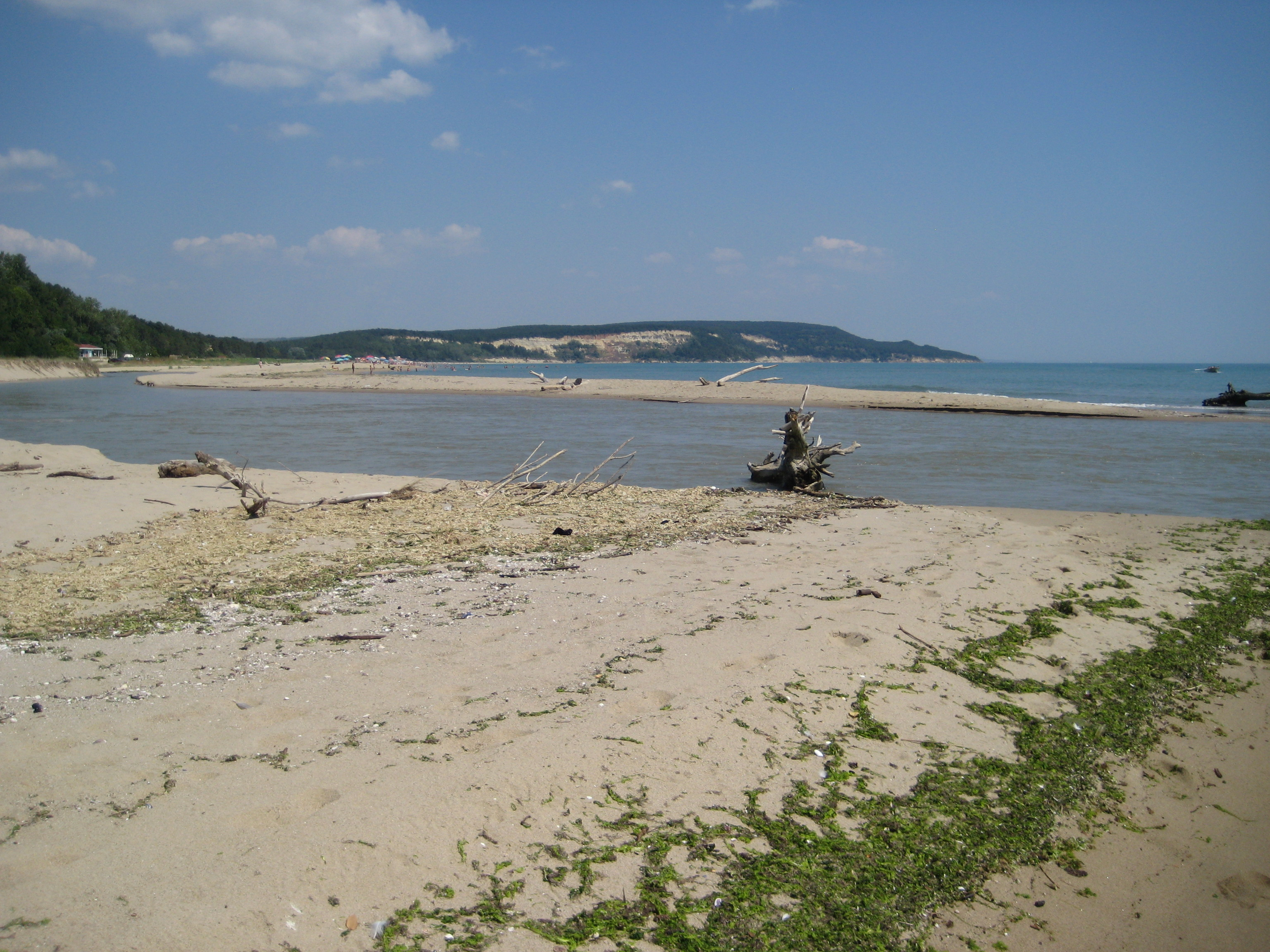
The mouth of the river, as viewed from the south from the Kamchia Biosphere Reserve. Note the spit which has been formed at its mouth

The towns the river flows past include Veliki Preslav and Smyadovo in Shumen Province, and Dalgopol and Dolni Chiflik in Varna Province. The Ticha feeds the dam lake Ticha and Luda Kamchiya feeds the dam lakes Kamchiya and Tsonevo], which supply water to Varna and Burgas. Lake Tsonevo is also a preferred fishing spot for much of Eastern Bulgaria. The Luda Kamchiya gorge, which cuts across Stara Planina provides the easternmost of the three railway routes between northern and southern Bulgaria. The river valley is fertile, lined with orchards and vegetable gardens; much of it is irrigated. The lower Kamchiya is navigable for smaller motor boats.

A minke whale was seen at the river mouth in 1926 and this was one of two records of any baleen whales in the history along with a stranding of the same species north of Batumi in 1882.

== Environment and pollution ==
A 2006 study conducted by the Institute of Oceanology and the Bulgarian Academy of Sciences on the water quality and its impact on the Black Sea coastal zone concluded that

Nutrients content (nitrite, phosphate) in Kamchia River downstream does not always correspond to national water quality standards. The comparison of data from different periods of investigation reveals a slight tendency of decreasing of phosphate and nitrites content and BOD. A decreasing tendency was established as a positive sign of water quality evolution last years

Other environmental issues are that the river is purportedly becoming marshy. The water lily, torfaceous snowdrop, and white Kamchia lily are also disappearing according to the World Wildlife Fund. The Storage Battery Plant in Targovishte is a significant polluter (heavy metals) of the Kamchia River.

Cattle breeding is the second major source of water pollution and directly affects sources of drinking water. Due to a serious lack of water purification stations on cattle farms, non-purified waste waters pour into the various water basins. The same holds true for the underground waters, as nitrates, phosphates, and other macroelements used in farming are dissolved and washed away by rains, to appear subsequently in water basins and mineral springs. The Kamchia reservoir, which is the primary source of drinking water for Bourgas and a secondary source for Varna, is an example. Water and sewage experts have stated that the "Komounari" hydroelectric project should not divert waters from the highly polluted Gorna Kamchia River into the Kamchia reservoir. This reservoir, as well as other sources of drinking water for Varna, have old and low-capacity purification stations. During droughts, drinking water is drawn from the reservoir that does not meet sanitary standards.

The third main pollutant is waste water from everyday household activities in cities and small towns. One of the major problems at the Kamchia reservoir is the lack of purified water provided to the town of Kotel. The city of Varna discharges too much impure water.

However, on a more positive note, as a result of improvements to the Kamchia river, it no longer floods the dense forest. This was responsible for the spread of Dutch elm disease, which had caused great damage to elms and ash trees.

== Eponymous honor ==
Kamchiya Glacier on Livingston Island in the South Shetland Islands, Antarctica is named after Kamchiya River.

== See also ==
- Resort of Kamchyia
- Kamchia (biosphere reserve)
