= Sungurlare =

Sungurlare, Bulgaria Сунгурларе
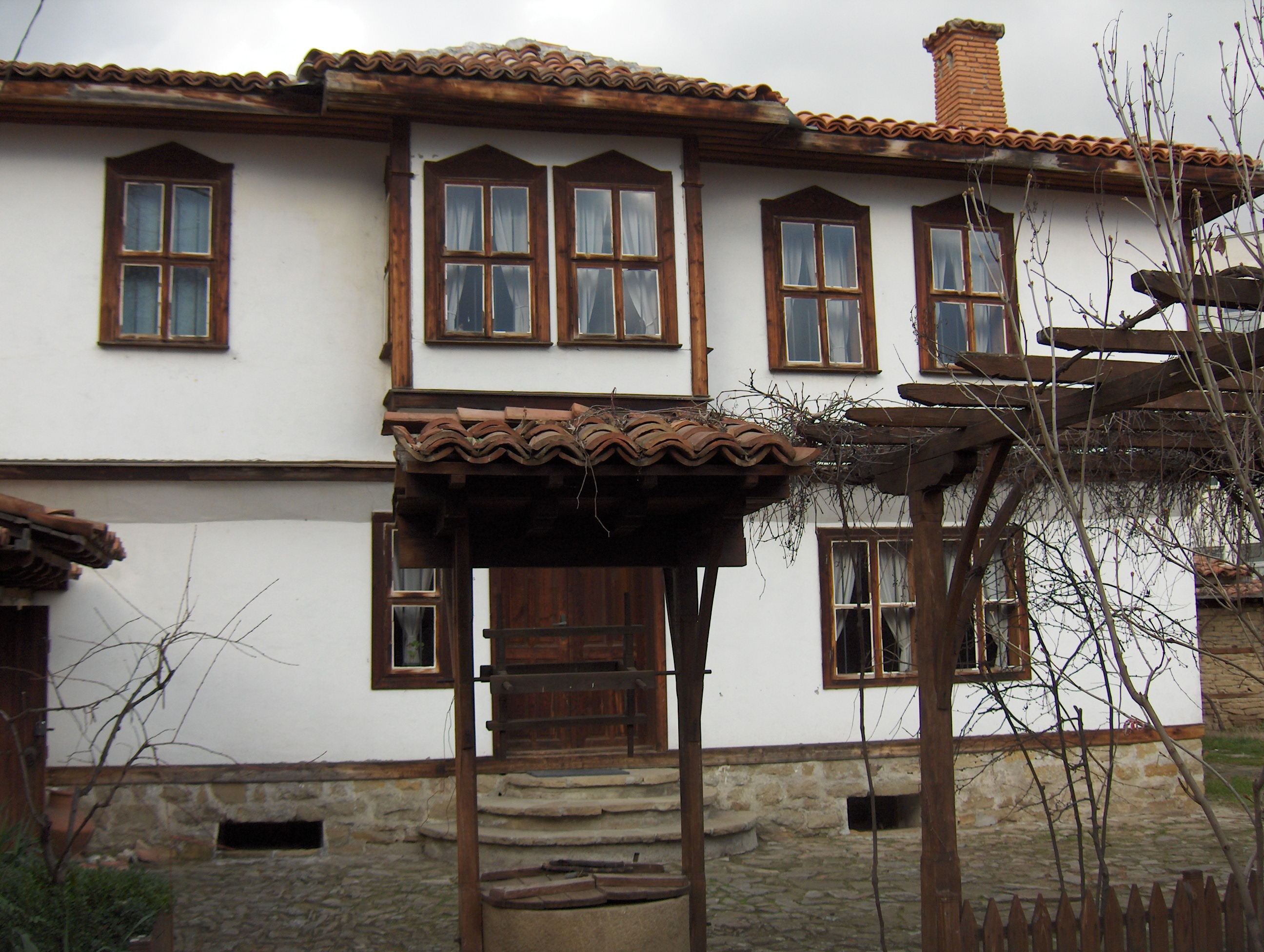
- Museum of Winery and Viticulture in Sungurlare

- Location of Sungurlare
- Coordinates: 42°46′N 26°47′E
- Country: Bulgaria
- Provinces (Oblast): Burgas

Government
  - Mayor: Georgi Kenov
- Elevation: 178 m (584 ft)

Population (2008)
  - Total: 3,539
- Time zone: UTC+2 (EET)
  - Summer (DST): UTC+3 (EEST)
- Postal Code: 8470
- Area code: 05571

Sungurlare (Bulgarian: Сунгурларе, pronounced [suŋɡurˈɫarɛ]) is a town in southeastern Bulgaria, part of Burgas Province. It is the administrative centre of Sungurlare Municipality, which lies in the northwestern part of Burgas Province.

Sungurlare lies in the Karnobat Valley some 80 kilometres west-northwest of Burgas and 25 kilometres west of Karnobat. The area has been inhabited since antiquity, with several Thracian mounds, pottery and Ancient Roman coins discovered. The present town was first mentioned in Ottoman tax registers in the 16th century. 44 local families moved to present-day Ukraine during the Ottoman rule of Bulgaria, founding Bulgarian colonies in Crimea.

The town is a well-known centre of winery in Bulgaria, with strong traditions in the production of Bulgarian wine. A museum dedicated to viticulture and winery was founded in Sungurlare in 1984, accommodated in the 1882 house of rich local wine dealers.

== Municipality ==
Sungurlare municipality includes the following 30 places:

- Balabanchevo
- Beronovo
- Bosilkovo
- Chernitsa
- Chubra
- Dabovitsa
- Esen
- Gorovo
- Grozden
- Kamensko
- Kamchia
- Klimash
- Kosten
- Lozarevo
- Lozitsa
- Manolich
- Podvis
- Prilep
- Pchelin
- Sadovo
- Saedinenie
- Skala
- Slavyantsi
- Sungurlare
- Terziysko
- Valchin
- Vedrovo
- Velislav
- Vezenkovo
- Zavet

== Gallery ==
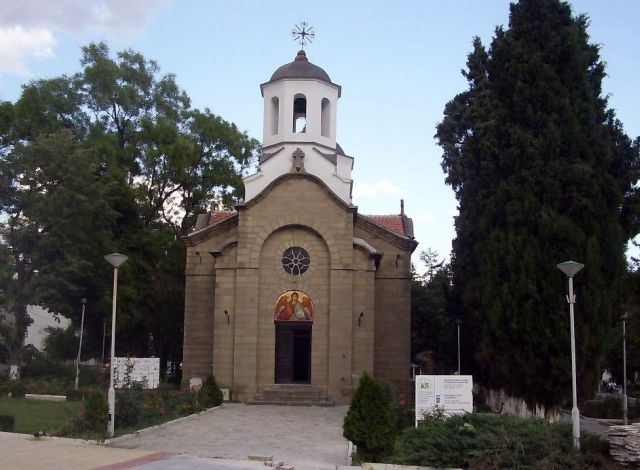
Eastern Orthodox church in Sungurlare

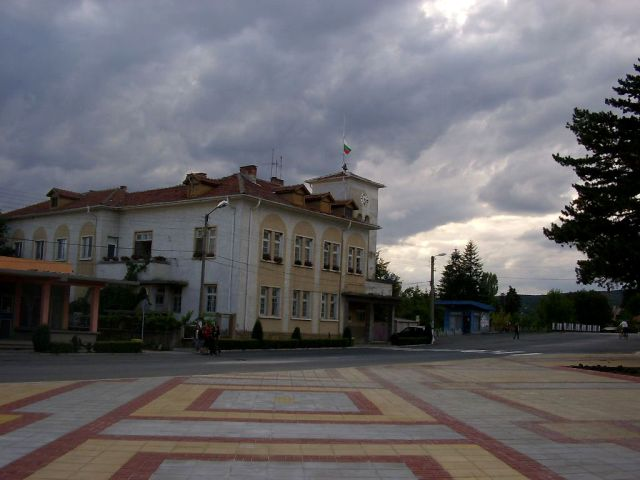
City centre
