= Karnobat Valley =

Valley in Bulgaria

- Valley
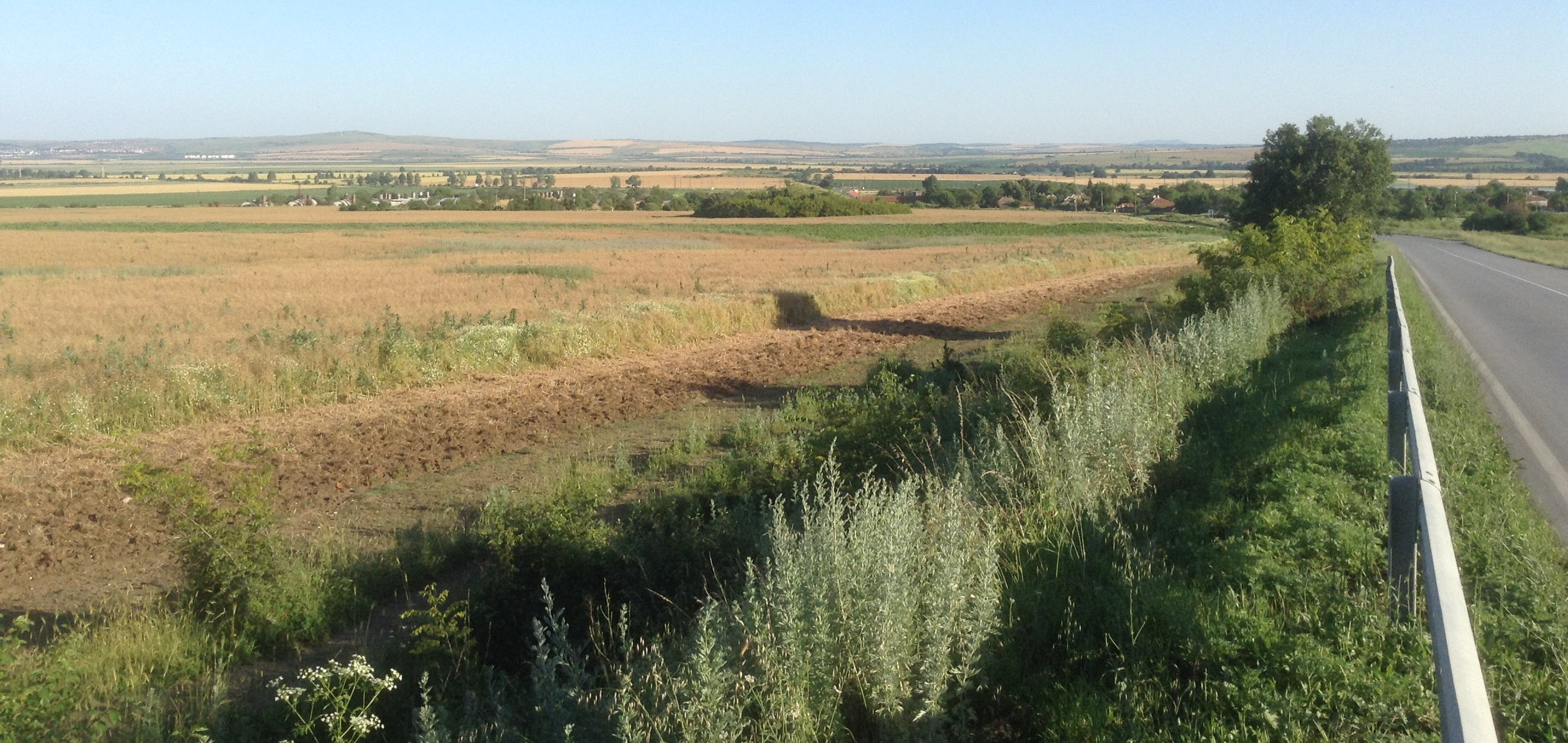
- A view of the valley at Lozarevo
- Interactive map of Karnobat Valley
- Coordinates: 42°43′52″N 26°52′46″E
- Location: Bulgaria

Area
  - Total: 320 km^{2} (120 sq mi)

Dimensions
  - Length: 45 km (28 mi)
  - Width: 7 km (4.3 mi)

Karnobat Valley (Bulgarian: Карнобатска котловина) is situated in eastern Bulgaria and is the tenth of the eleven Sub-Balkan valleys in direction west–east. It is named after the town of Karnobat, its main settlement.

== Geography ==
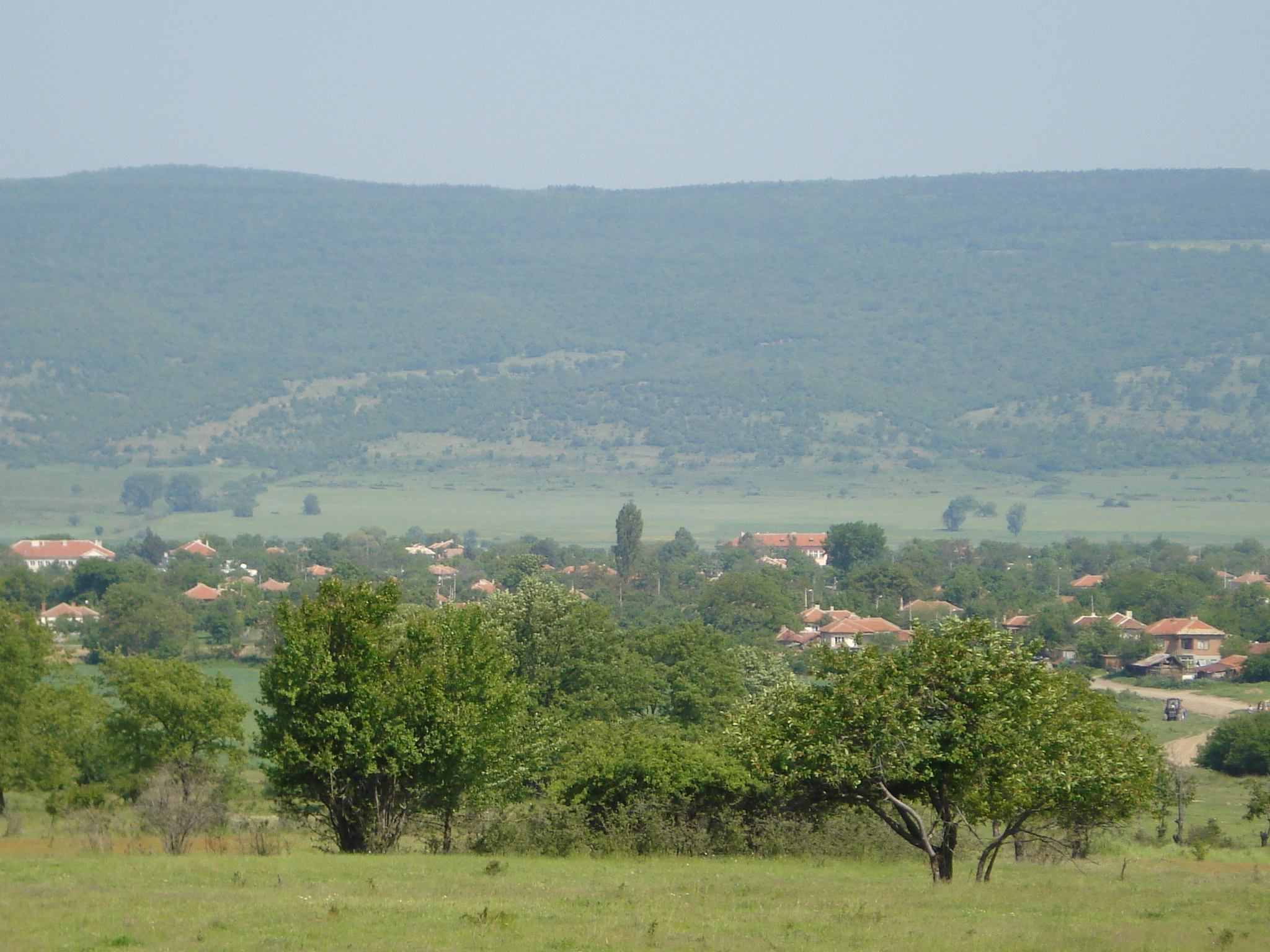
A view of the valley at Padarevo

The valley is enclosed between the Stidovo and Karnobat divisions of the Balkan Mountains to the north, the Terzijski Ridge of the Balkan Mountains to the southwest and the Hisar Heights to the southeast. To the south it connects with the Sliven Valley through the river Mochuritsa, a left tributary of the Tundzha; and to the east a low saddle in the area of the village of Chernograd forms the divide with the Aytos Valley.

The valley spans a territory of 320 km^{2}. It reaches a length of 45 km from northwest to southeast; its width varies between 1 and 7 km. The average altitude is 180 m, with inclination in southern, southeastern and southwestern direction. It is divided in two areas — the higher Sungurlare field to the northwest and the lower and partially swampy Karnobat field to the east.

The bottom of the Karnobat Valley is filled with river and Tertiary sandy-clay sediments. Its lowest sections along the Mochuritsa are marshy. The surrounding mountain slopes are made up of Upper Cretaceous sediments and pyroclastic rocks. It is drained by the Mochuritsa and its tributaries. The valley lies in the transitional zone between the temperate continental climatic zone and the continental Mediterranean zone. The soils are alluvial in the river valleys, and cinnamon, smolnitsi and rendzina in the peripheral parts.

At the southern entrance of the valley, between the Terziyski Ridge and the Hisar Heights, lie the ruins of the medieval stronghold Markeli, which played a major role in the early Byzantine–Bulgarian wars. It was the site of two major battles between the two empires, one in 756 and another in 792.

== Settlements, transportation and economy ==
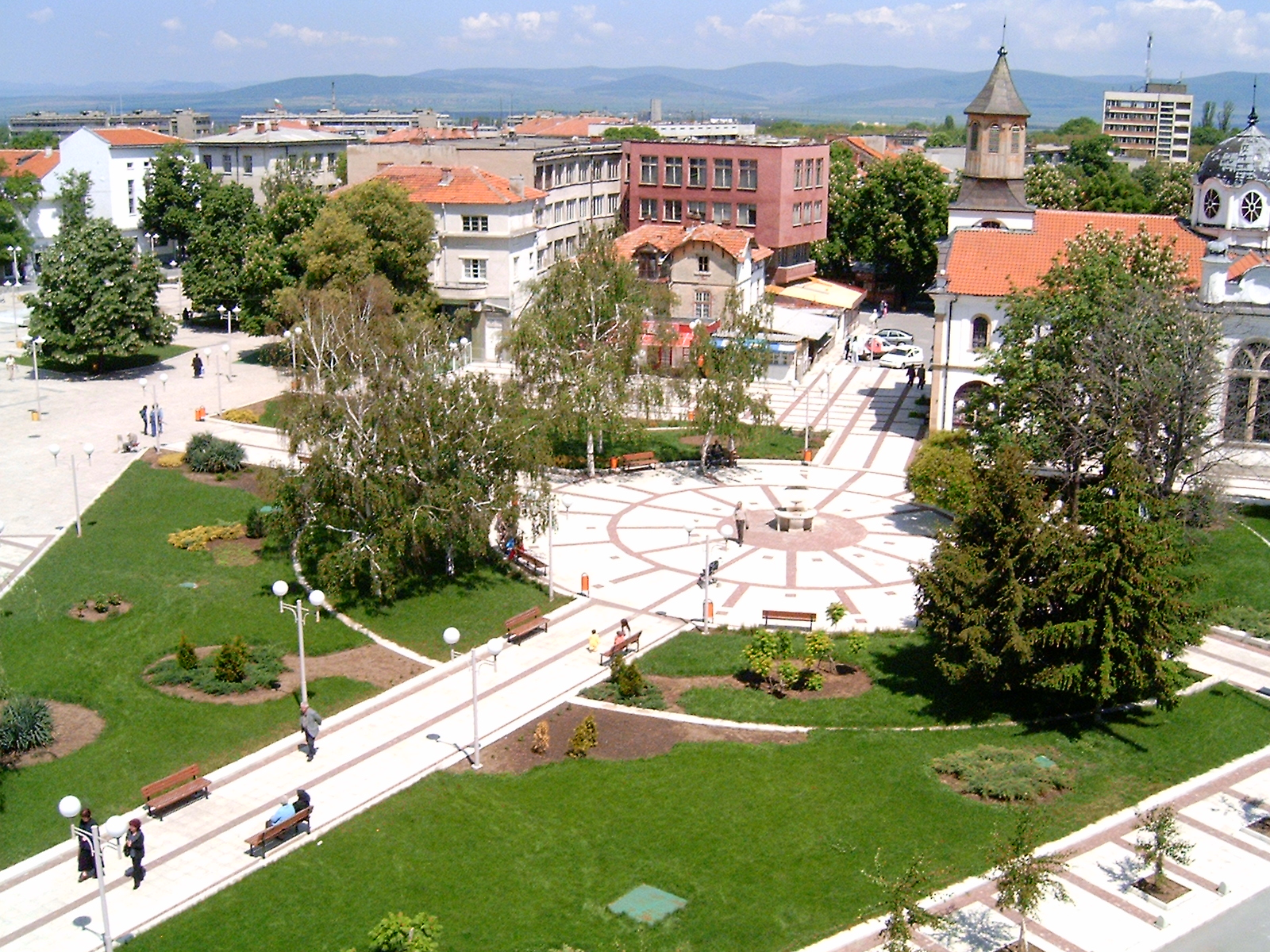
A view of the main town, Karnobat

Administratively, the valley falls almost entirely in Burgas Province, with small sections in the west extending into Sliven Province. There are two towns and 17 villages in the former — Glumche, Zimen, Iskra, Karnobat (town), Klikach, Madrino, Nevestino, Ognen, Sigmen and Sokolovo in Karnobat Municipality, and Valchin, Gorovo, Grozden, Lozarevo, Lozitsa, Slavyantsi, Sungurlare (town), Chernitsa and Chubra in Karnobat Municipality. In Sliven Province are the villages of Mokren and Padarevo, both in Kotel Municipality.

The valley is served by four roads of the national network, as well as local roads. From west to east passes a 19.6 km stretch of the first class I-6 road Gyueshevo–Sofia–Karlovo–Burgas. In the westernmost part of the valley in direction north–south runs a 5.2 km section of the first class I-7 road Silistra–Shumen–Yambol–Lesovo. A 17.7 km stretch of the second class II-73 road Shumen–Smyadovo–Karnobat traverses its central part in direction northwest–southeast. Following the same general direction runs a 17.2 km section of the third class III-705 road Beronovo–Sungurlare–Madrino.

The valley is traversed by two main railways served by the Bulgarian State Railways — a section of railway line No. 8 Plovdiv–Stara Zagora–Burgas direction southwest–northeast between the crossing over the Mochuritsa west of Karnobat and Chernograd, as well as a stretch of railway line No. 3 Iliyantsi (Sofia)–Karlovo–Sliven–Karnobat–Varna in direction southeast–northwest between Karnobat and Lozarevo.

The valley is fertile, with favourable conditions for viticulture, orchards, vegetable production, industrial crops and walnuts. Only the western half within the limits of the Sungurlare Municipality produces 25,000 tons of grapes. The main economic center is Karnobat with well-developed machine-building and food industry, which includes the Brodnitze cable factory for the automotive industry; Vinprom Karnobat, one of the biggest manufacturers of alcoholic beverages in Bulgaria; the VINS refinery for grain alcohol and distillates; as well as several producers of metallic structures. There are several factories in Sungurlare producing hydraulic machinery and alcoholic beverages.

== Sources ==
- Георгиев (Georgiev), Владимир (Vladimir) (1982). Енциклопедия България. Том III. И-Л [Encyclopaedia Bulgaria. Volume III. I-L] (in Bulgarian). и колектив. София (Sofia): Издателство на БАН (Bulgarian Academy of Sciences Press).
- Мичев (Michev), Николай (Nikolay); Михайлов (Mihaylov), Цветко (Tsvetko); Вапцаров (Vaptsarov), Иван (Ivan); Кираджиев (Kiradzhiev), Светлин (Svetlin) (1980). Географски речник на България [Geographic Dictionary of Bulgaria] (in Bulgarian). София (Sofia): Наука и култура (Nauka i kultura).
- Андреев (Andreev), Йордан (Jordan); Лалков (Lalkov), Милчо (Milcho) (1996). Българските ханове и царе (The Bulgarian Khans and Tsars) (in Bulgarian). Велико Търново (Veliko Tarnovo): Абагар (Abagar). ISBN 954-427-216-X.
