= Mochuritsa =

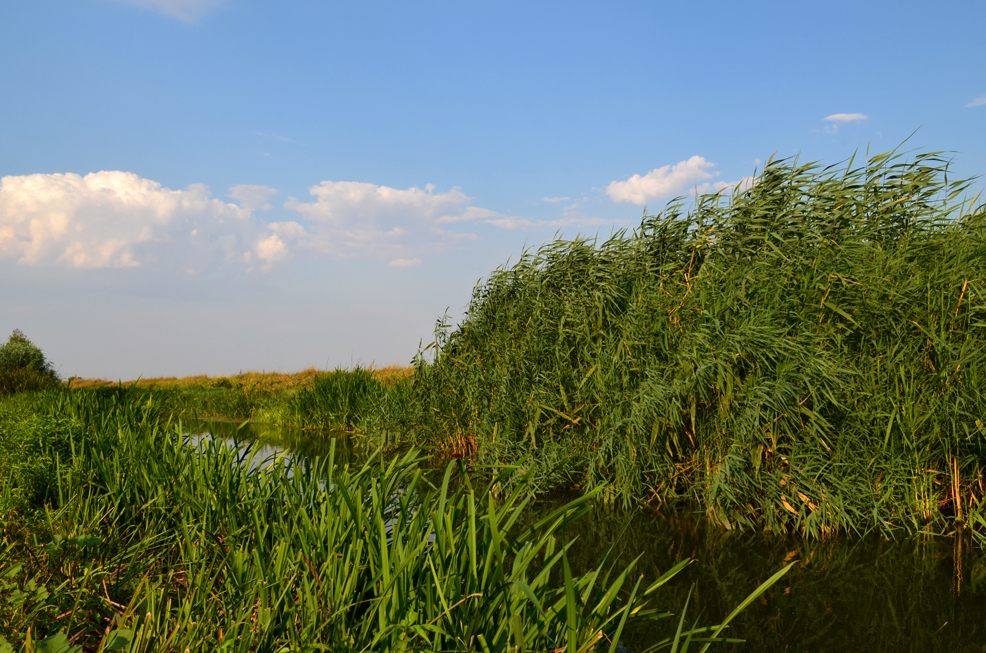

Location
- Country: Bulgaria

Physical characteristics
- Source
  - location: Gabrov Dol, Balkan Mountains
  - coordinates: 42°44′2.04″N 26°32′54.96″E
  - elevation: 561 m (1,841 ft)
- Mouth
  - location: Tundzha
  - coordinates: 42°30′14.04″N 26°31′9.12″E
  - elevation: 128 m (420 ft)
- Length: 86 km (53 mi)
- Basin size: 1,278 km^{2} (493 sq mi)

Basin features
- Progression: Tundzha→ Maritsa

The Mochuritsa (Bulgarian: Мочурица) is a river in southern Bulgaria, a left tributary of the river Tundzha of the Maritsa drainage, with a length of 86 km. It is the largest tributary of the Tundzha.

== Geography ==
The river takes its source at an altitude of 561 m on the southern foothills of the Stidovska planina section of the Balkan Mountains, in the vicinity of the Novo Selo Range. Along its entire length, it flows through flat terrain in a wide valley with a large flood terrace and a small longitudinal slope of 1.4 %. In its upper course, it crosses from west to east the Sungurlare field of the Karnobat Valley, while gradually turning southwards. West of the town of Karnobat, it turns in a southwesterly direction and forms a short gorge between the Terziyski Ridge to the west and the Hisar Heights to the east. Downstream of the gorge, the Mochuritsa enters the Sliven Valley, where its longitudinal slope becomes even smaller and marshy areas and high groundwater appear in its valley, which gives the name of the river from the Bulgarian word for marsh, мочурище (translit. mochurishte). It flows into the Tundzha at an altitude of 128 m in the north industrial zone of the city of Yambol.

Its drainage basin covers a territory of 1278 km^{2} or 15.16% of the Tundzha's total.

The Mochuritsa has predominantly rain feed with high water in February–May and low water in July–November. The average annual flow is at the village of Vodenichane is 2.7 m^{3}/s due to the intensive use of the water for irrigation.

Its entire course is included in the Natura 2000 network of nature protection areas of the European Union, protecting fish species such as European bitterling and round-scaled barbel, as well as aquatic animals like Eurasian otter, European fire-bellied toad, Yellow-bellied toad, etc.

== Settlements and economy ==
The river flows in the provinces of Burgas, Sliven and Yambol. There are eleven settlements along its course, one city and ten villages. In Sliven Province is the village of Mokren, in Burgas Province are located the villages of Chubra, Tserkovski, Devetintsi and Devetak, and in Yambol province are Malenovo, Palauzovo, Vodenichane, Charda and the city of Yambol. Much the river's waters are utilised for irrigation.

There are two main roads through its valley, a section of the Trakia motorway between Yambol and Karnobat and a 11.9 km stretch of the third class III-705 road Beronovo–Sungurlare–Madrino–Valchin between Sungurlare and Madrino.

The river valley is traversed by a section of railway line No. 8 Plovdiv–Stara Zagora–Yambol–Karnobat–Burgas served by the Bulgarian State Railways.
