= Luda Kamchiya =

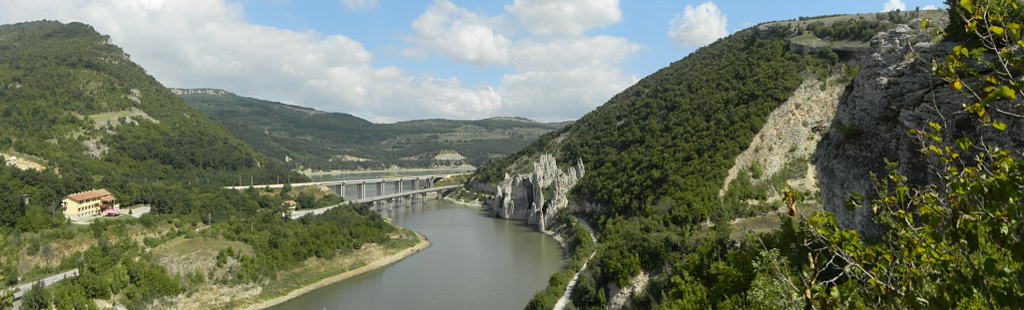
- Entry of the Luda Kamchiya in Tsonevo Reservoir and the Chudnite Skali rock formation

Location
- Country: Bulgaria

Physical characteristics
- Source
  - location: N of Vratnik, Balkan Mountains
  - coordinates: 42°49′13.08″N 26°12′47.16″E
  - elevation: 1,109 m (3,638 ft)
- Mouth
  - location: Kamchiya
  - coordinates: 43°2′39.12″N 27°26′34.08″E
  - elevation: 44 m (144 ft)
- Length: 201 km (125 mi)
- Basin size: 1,612 km^{2} (622 sq mi)

Basin features
- Progression: Kamchiya→ Black Sea

Luda Kamchiya (Bulgarian: Луда Камчия [ˈɫudɐ ˈkamt͡ʃijɐ], lit. 'Mad Kamchiya') is river in eastern Bulgaria, the main tributary of the river Kamchiya. Reaching 201 km, it is longer than the main stem of the Kamchiya, the Golyama Kamchiya (199 km), and is the tenth longest river in the country.

== Geography ==
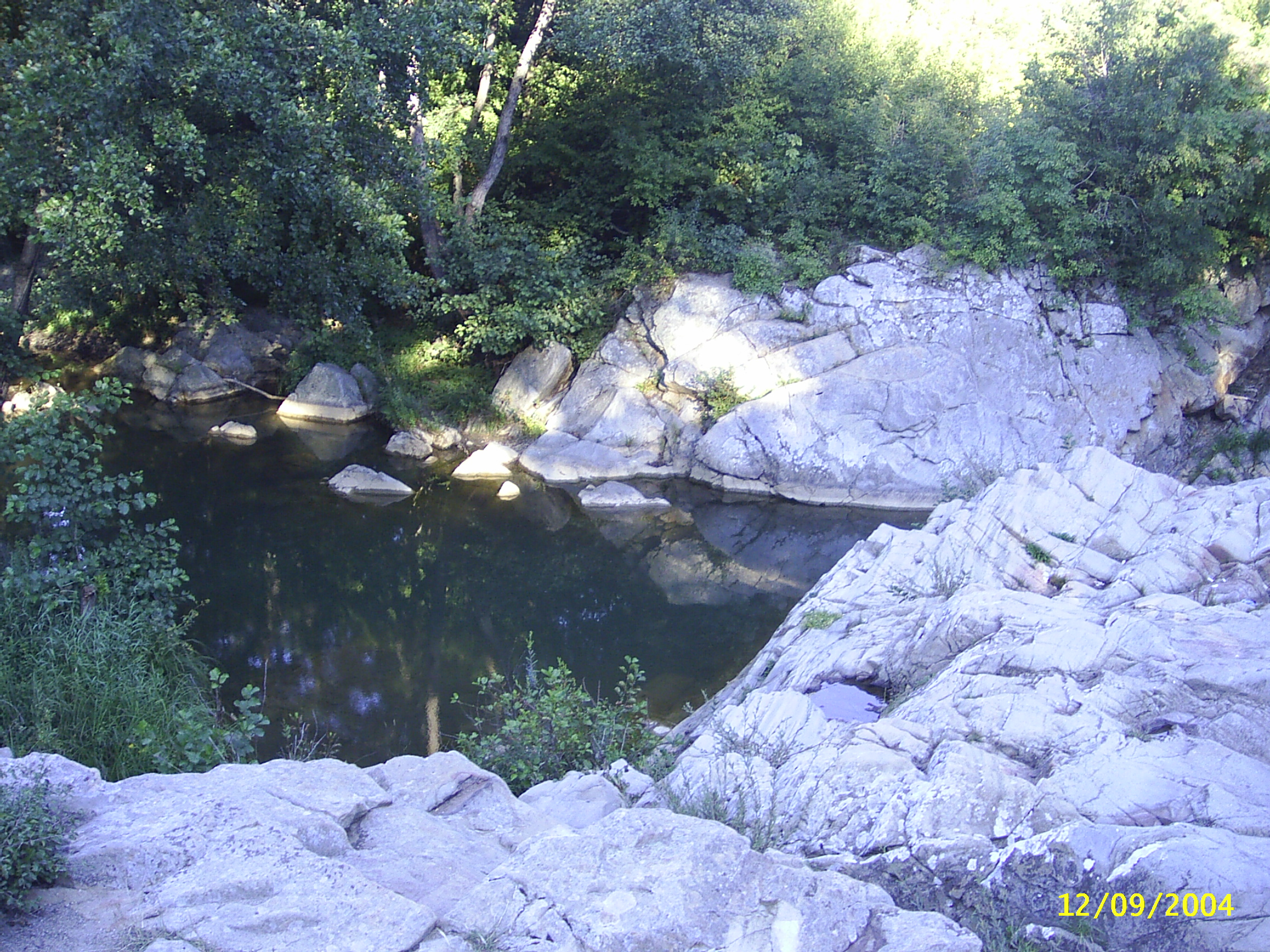
The Luda Kamchiya at Gradets

The Luda Kamchia River originates from a spring at an altitude of 1,109 m on the north foothills of Mount Vratnik in the Sliven Mountain division of the Balkan Mountains. It flows in a deep forested valley, covered with deciduous woods. The valley widens downstream from the village of Gradets and forms large meanders. From the source to the village of Daskotna the Luda Kamchiya flows in general an easterly direction between the Razboyna Ridge, Kotlenska Mountain and Varbishka Mountain to the north and the Sliven, Stidovska and Karnobat mountains to the south, all of them subdivisions of the Balkan Mountains. It then turns northeast, forming the deep Luda Kamchiya Gorge between the Varbishka Mountain to the northwest and the Kamchiyska Mountain to the southeast, exiting the gorge at Tsonevo. The river joins the Golyama Kamchiya at an altitude of 26 m at village of Velichkovo, giving rise to the Kamchiya river proper.

Its drainage basin covers a territory of 1,612 km^{2} or 30.1% of the Kamchiya's total. It borders the basins of the Golyama Kamchiya to the north, the Yantra to the northwest, and the Tundzha, the Aytoska reka and the Hadzhiyska reka to the south. The largest tributaries are the Kotlenska reka (25 km, left) and the Golyama reka (25 km, right).

The Luda Kamchiya has a rain–snow feed. High water is in February–March and low water is in August–September. The average annual discharge is 11.4 m^{3}/s at Asparuhovo.

== Settlements and economy ==
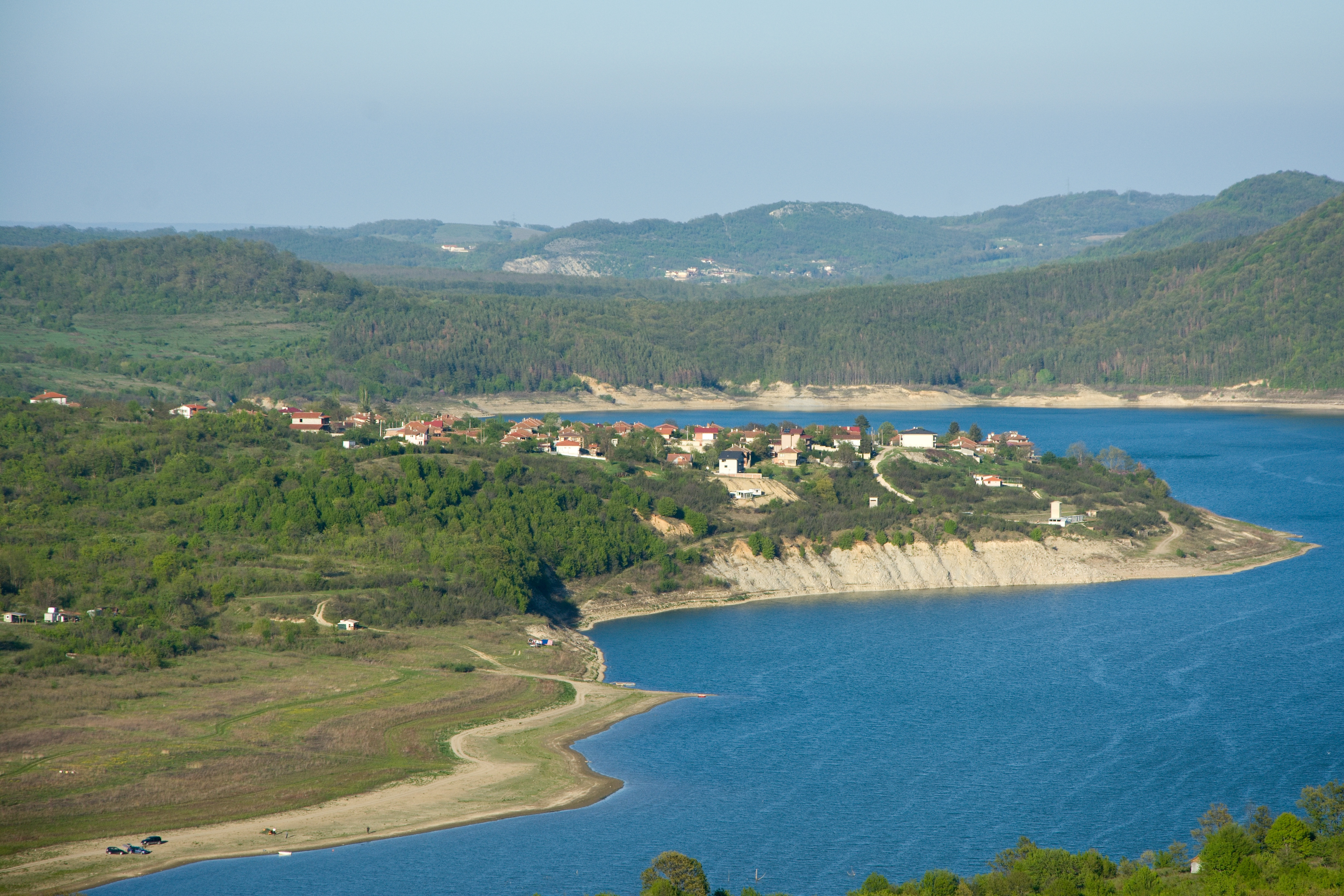
Tsonevo Reservoir at Asparuhovo

The river flows in Sliven, Burgas and Varna Provinces. There are 13 villages along its course: Rakovo, Ichera and Gradets in Sliven Province, Dabovitsa, Beronovo, Vezenkovo, Kamchiya, Zavet, Daskotina, Bilka and Dobromir in Burgas Province, and Asparuhovo and Tsonevo in Varna Province. The Luda Kamchiya is utilized for irrigation and potable water, including for the two largest Bulgarian Black Sea cities, Varna and Burgas. There are two major reservoirs along its course, Kamchiya and Tsonevo. At the latter, rising over the river banks are located the Chudnite Skali, a formation of ten 40–50 m high rock needles, shaped like castle towers.

Its valley is an important transport route, traversed by a section of railway line No. 3 Sofia–Karlovo–Varna served by the Bulgarian State Railways, one of the three railway crossings of the Balkan Mountains. There two roads along its valley, a 24.1 km stretch of the third class III-208 road Vetrino–Dalgopol–Aytos follows the Luda Kamchiya between Asparuhovo and Daskotina, and a 10.5 km section of the third class III-488 road Gradets–Sliven follows it between Gradets and Ichera.
