= II-73 road (Bulgaria) =

Road in Bulgaria

Republic Road I-73
- Републикански път I-73

Route information
- Length: 89.9 km (55.9 mi)

Major junctions
- From: Km 12.5 of I-7
- To: Km 41.9 of I-6, Karnobat

Location
- Country: Bulgaria
- Towns: Shumen, Smyadovo, Karnobat

Highway system
- Highways in Bulgaria

Republican Road II-73 (Bulgarian: Републикански път II-73) is a second-class road in eastern Bulgaria, running through Shumen and Burgas Province Provinces. Its length is 89.9 km (55.9 mi).

== Route description ==
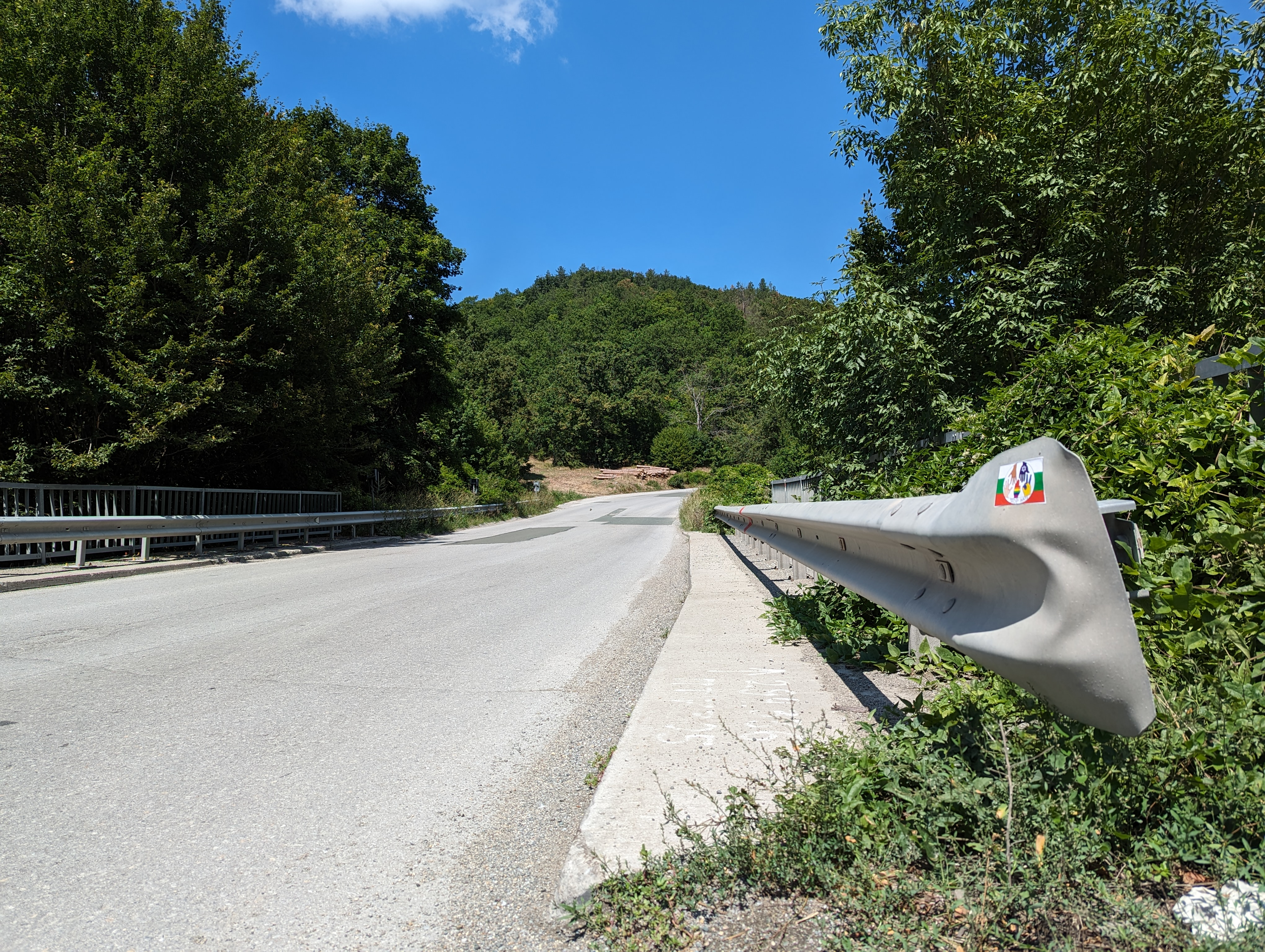
II-73 road near Rish Pass

The road starts at Km 121.9 km (75.7 mi) of the first class I-7 road southeast of the city of Shumen and heads south through the Shumen Field. It runs through the village of Radko Dimitrievo, crosses the river Golyama Kamchiya and enters the Smyadovo Field. After passing east of the town of Smyadovo the road enters the Veselinovo Gorge of the river Brestova reka, a right tributary of the Golyama Kamchiya. It exits the gorge at the village of Veselinovo and reaches the eastern part of the Rish Valley. There, it turns west and in 8 km again heads south and begins to ascend the northern slopes of the Varbitsa Mountain, part of the eastern Balkan Mountains, through the Rish Pass (410 m), and enters Burgas Province.

The II-73 descends along the southern slopes of the mountain, crosses the river Luda Kamchiya and reaches the village of Prilep. It then runs through the low Karnobat Pass (310 m) and at the village of Lozarevo enters the Karnobat Valley, where the road passes through the village of Valchin, turns southeast and in the southeastern outskirts of Karnobat reaches its terminus at Km 460.9 of the first class I-6 road.
