= Chudnite Skali =

Geological formation in eastern Bulgaria

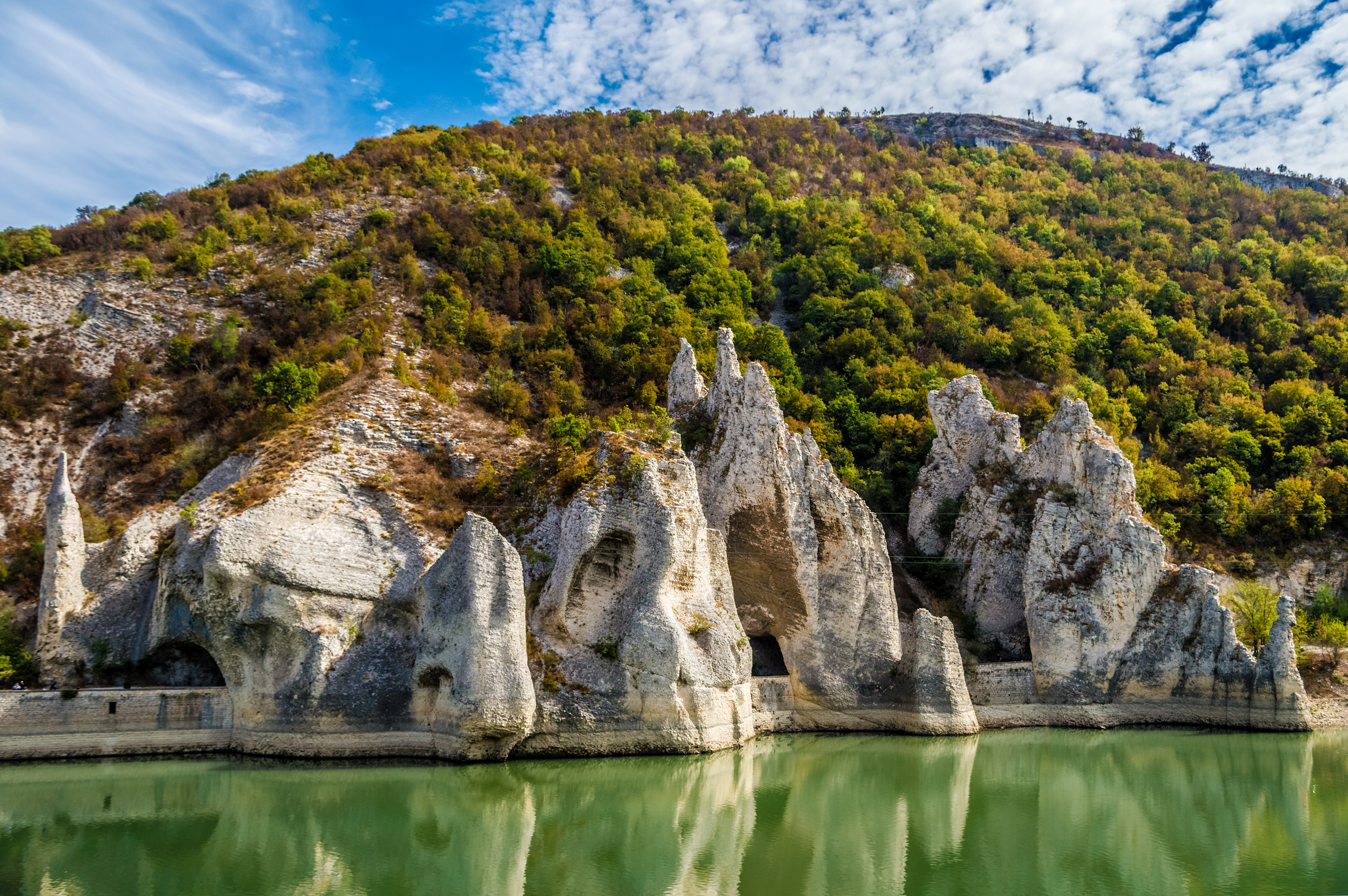
- A view of Chudnite Skali
- Type: Geological unit
- Unit of: Balkan Mountains
- Area: 0.1 km^{2}

Lithology
- Primary: Limestone

Location
- Coordinates: 42°58′2″N 27°17′32″E
- Region: Varna Province
- Country: Bulgaria

Chudnite Skali (Bulgarian: Чудните скали, lit. the Wonderful Rocks) are a rock formation in eastern Bulgaria, declared a natural landmark on 17 February 1949 with a territory of 12.5 ha or 0.12 km^{2}.

== Description ==
Chudnite Skali are located at an altitude of 170 m in the eastern Balkan Mountains on the boundary with the fore-Balkan, lying some 4 km south of the village of Asparuhovo in Dalgopol Municipality of Varna Province. They rise over the right banks of the river Luda Kamchiya in the upper part of the Tsonevo Reservoir.

Chudnite Skali are a group of three rock massifs in the shape of tower-like needles with a height ranging between 15 and 40–50 m. They were formed as a result of wind erosion and the effects of the river water on the soft Paleocene limestone foundation. The rocks are micritic limestones with many flint concretions that give the outcrops a pitted appearance. The colour is light grey. There are a number of caves, crevasses and outcrops in the vicinity providing habitat for many plant and animal species, including birds of prey.

The formation is easily accessible with three tunnels of a small branch off the third class III-208 road Vetrino–Dalgopol–Aytos dug underneath the very rocks, linking the nearby villages of Asparuhovo and Dobromir. Across Chudnite skali is the bridge of railway line No. 3 Sofia–Karlovo–Varna over the reservoir.

== Gallery ==
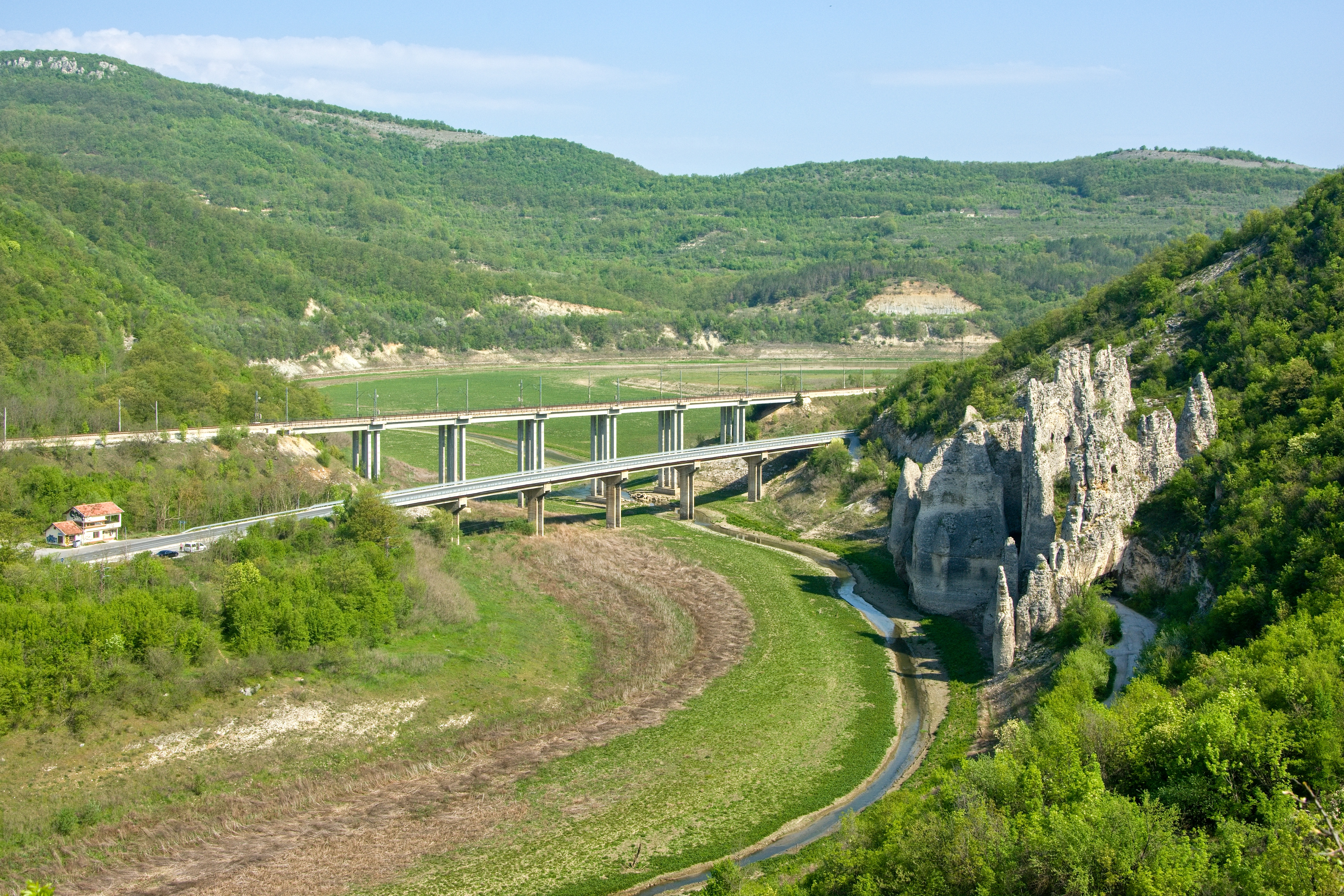
A distant view

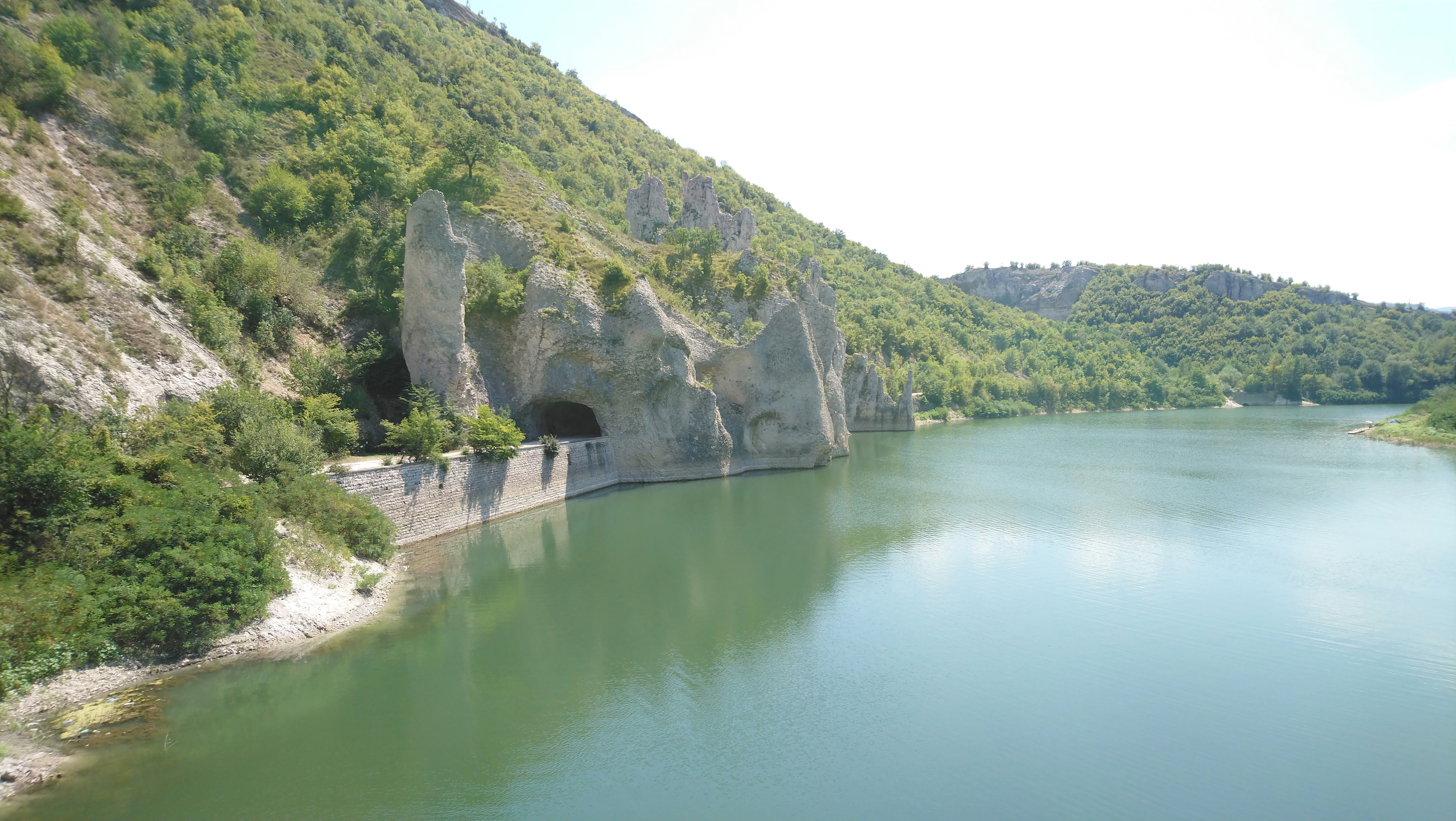
A view from the north

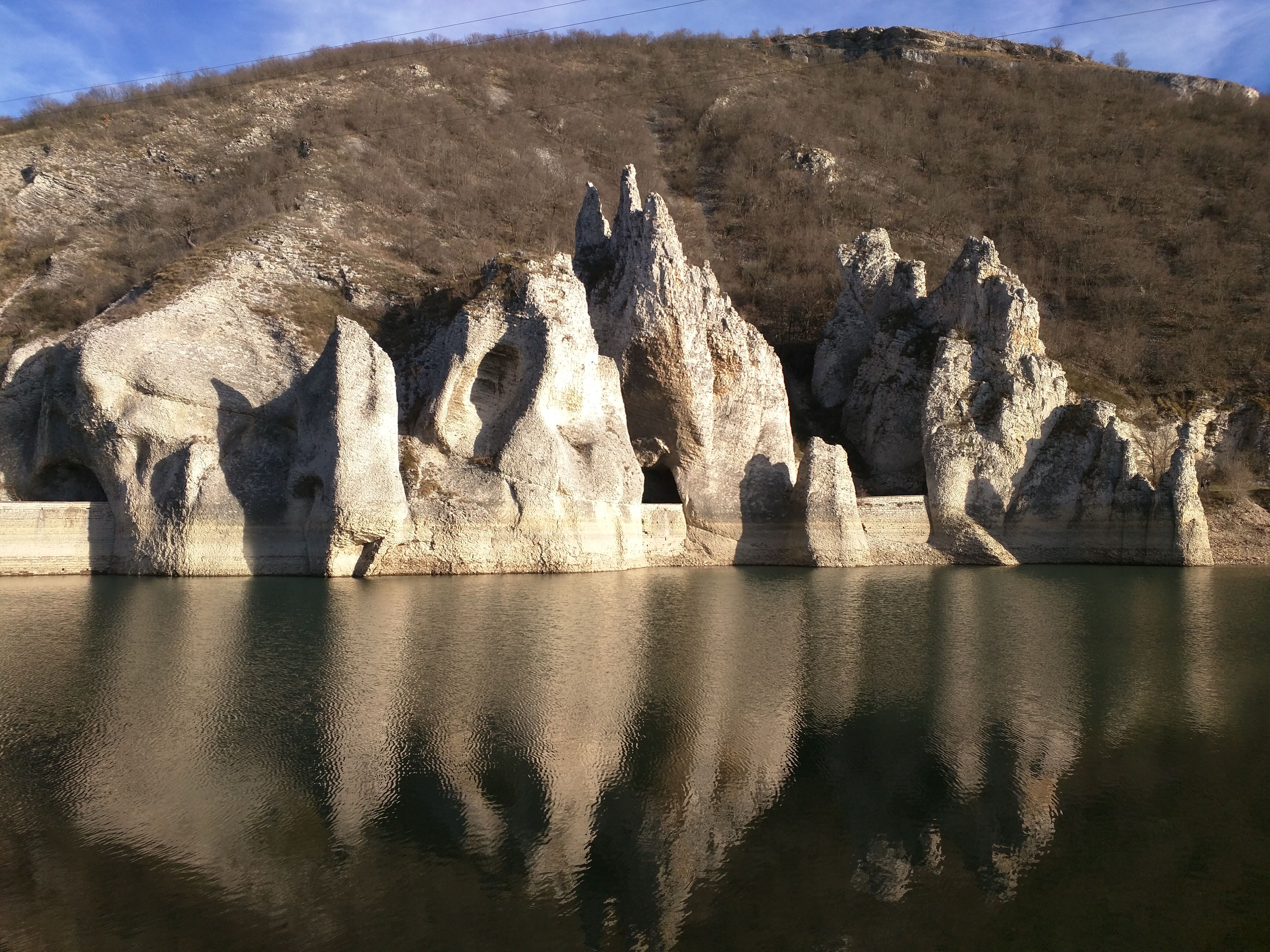
A view

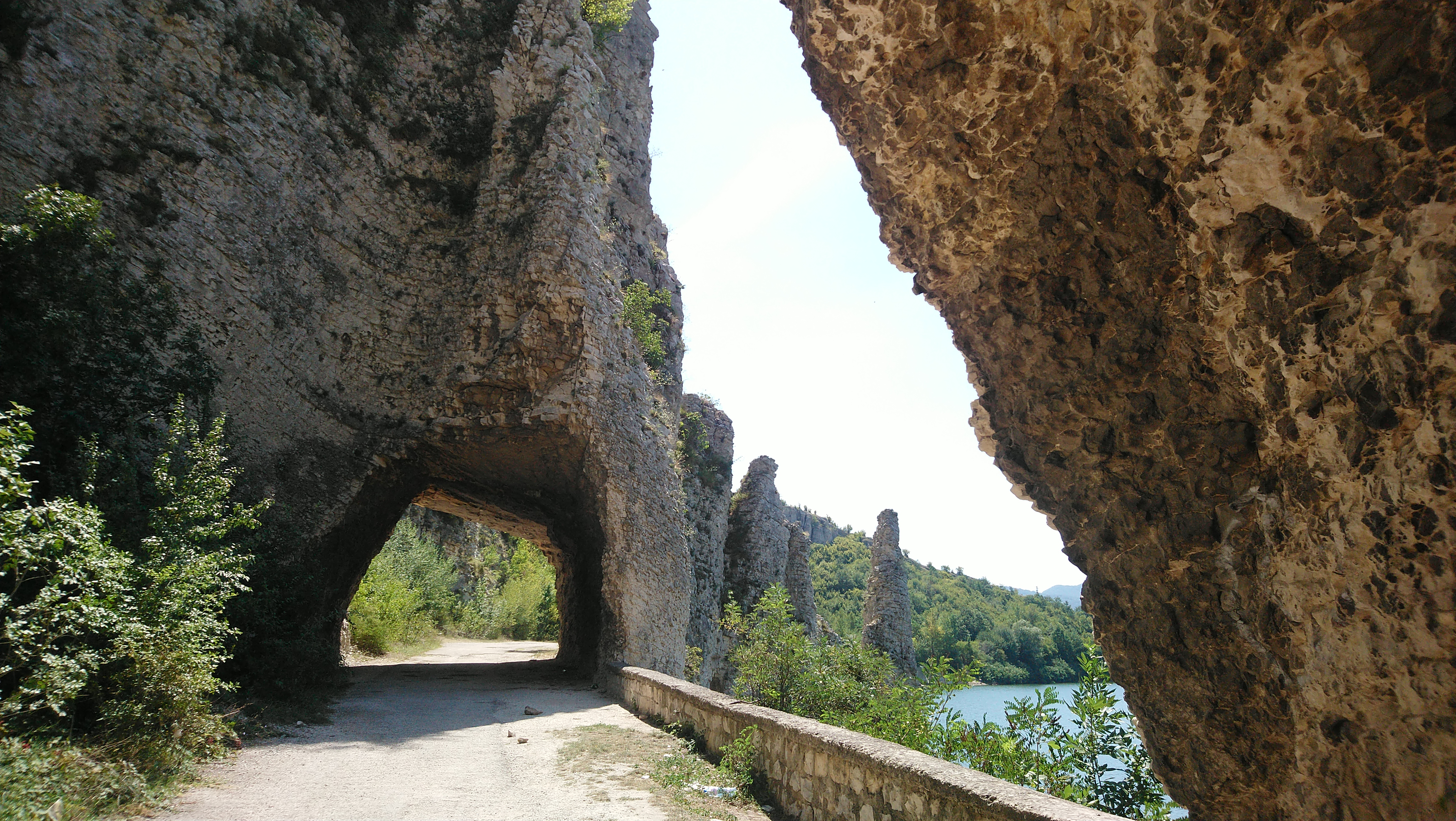
One of the tunnels

== See also ==
- List of rock formations in Bulgaria
- Geography of Bulgaria
- Balkan Mountains
