= Devetak =

Devetak may refer to:

- Devetak, Burgas Province, a village in Burgas Province, Bulgaria
- Devetak, Shtime, a village in the municipality of Shtime
- Devetak, Lukavac, a village in the municipality of Lukavac, Federation BiH, BiH

or:

- Devetak (mountain), a mountain in Republika Srpska, BiH

== See also ==
- Devetaki, a vollage in Lovech Province, Bulgaria
