= Dalgopol =

Dalgopol Дългопол
- Location of Dalgopol
- Coordinates: 43°03′N 27°21′E
- Country: Bulgaria
- Provinces (Oblast): Varna

Government
  - Mayor: Georgi Georgiev
- Elevation: 19 m (62 ft)

Population (May 2016)
  - Total: 13,578
- Time zone: UTC+2 (EET)
  - Summer (DST): UTC+3 (EEST)
- Postal Code: 0517
- Area code: 0517

Dalgopol (Bulgarian: Дългопол, pronounced [dɐɫɡoˈpɔɫ]; also transliterated Dǎlgopol) is a town in northeastern Bulgaria, part of Varna Province. It is the administrative centre of Dalgopol Municipality, which lies in the southwestern part of the Province. As of December 2009, the town had a population of 4,829.

Dalgopol lies 70 kilometres west of the provincial capital of Varna, near the Tsonevo Reservoir, in the eastern part of the Varbitsa Balkan Mountains.

== Municipality ==
Dalgopol municipality has an area of 442 square kilometres and includes the following 16 places:

- Arkovna
- Asparuhovo
- Boryana
- Dalgopol
- Kamen Dyal
- Komunari
- Krasimir
- Lopushna
- Medovets
- Partizani
- Polyatsite
- Royak
- Sava
- Sladka voda
- Tsonevo
- Velichkovo

== Honour ==
Dalgopol Glacier on Smith Island, South Shetland Islands is named after Dalgopol.
