= Luda (disambiguation) =

Ludacris (born 1977), nicknamed "Luda", is an American rapper.

Luda may also refer to:

== People ==
- Luda (singer) (born 1997), South Korean singer
- Luda Kroitor, Australian salsa dancer
- Dvorska Luda, Montenegrin rapper
- a diminutive of Ludmila (given name)

== Places ==
- 1158 Luda, a minor planet
- Lüda, a former name of Dalian, China
- Luda Kamchiya Gorge, gorge in the Balkan Mountains
- Luda Kamchiya, a river in eastern Bulgaria
- Luda Yana, river in southern Bulgaria

== Other uses ==
- Luda class destroyer, a Chinese ship class
- Luda (planthopper), an insect genus in the Delphacini

== See also ==
- Ludo (disambiguation)
