= Kamensko, Bulgaria =

Kamensko Каменско
- Hamlet
- Location within Bulgaria
- Country: Bulgaria
- Province: Burgas Province
- Municipality: Sungurlare Municipality
- Time zone: UTC+2 (EET)
  - Summer (DST): UTC+3 (EEST)

Kamensko is a hamlet near the village of Manolich, in Sungurlare Municipality, Burgas Province, in eastern Bulgaria.
