= Brestova reka =

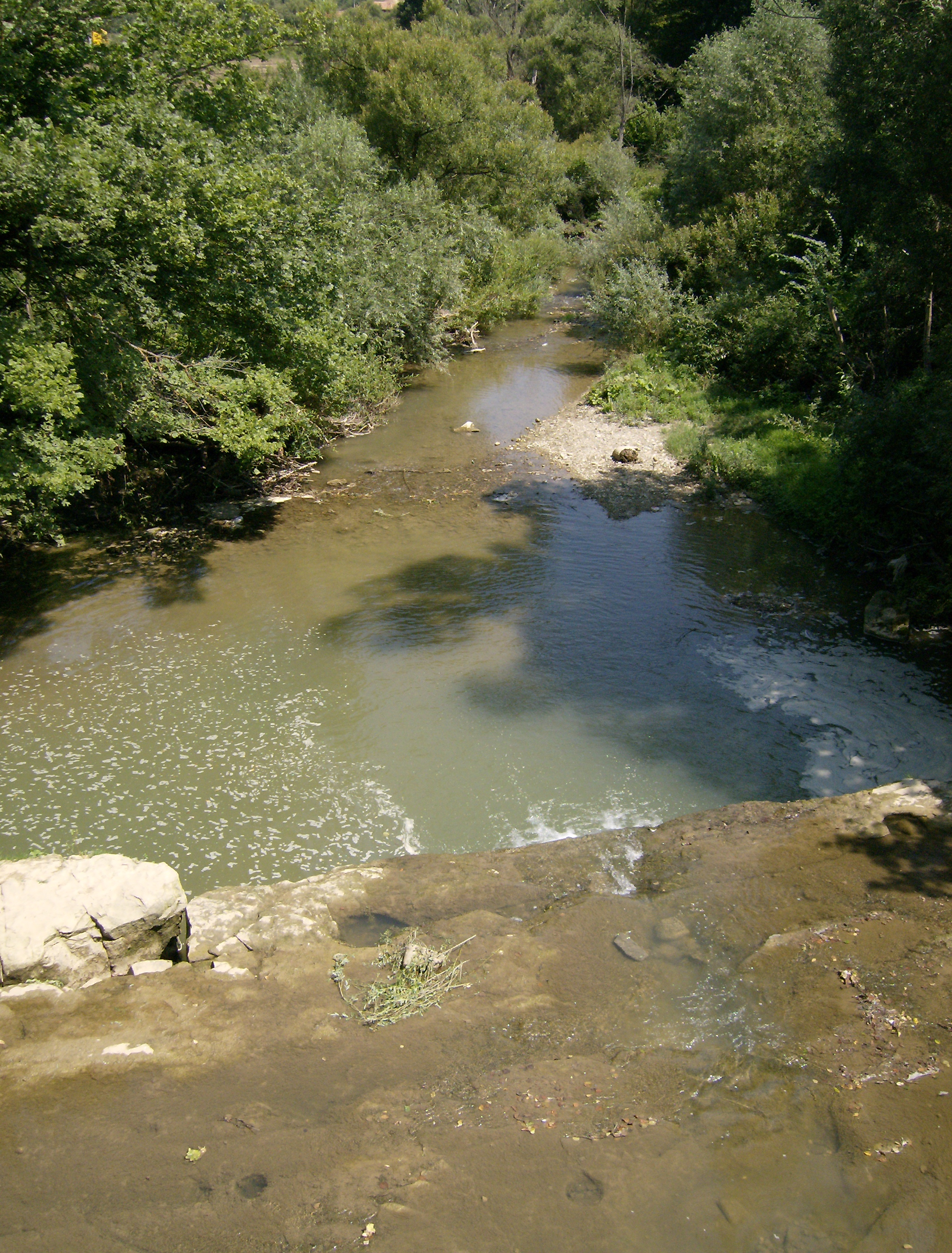

Location
- Country: Bulgaria

Physical characteristics
- Source
  - location: W of Rish Pass, Balkan Mountains
  - coordinates: 42°56′15″N 26°54′24.12″E
  - elevation: 528 m (1,732 ft)
- Mouth
  - location: Kamchiya
  - coordinates: 43°4′39″N 27°4′27.12″E
  - elevation: 54 m (177 ft)
- Length: 31 km (19 mi)
- Basin size: 175 km^{2} (68 sq mi)

Basin features
- Progression: Kamchiya→ Black Sea

The Brestova reka (Bulgarian: Брестова река) is a 31 km-long river in eastern Bulgaria, a right tributary of the river Golyama Kamchiya, the main stem of the Kamchiya of the Black Sea basin.

The river takes its source under the name Byala reka at an altitude of 528 m in the central part of the Varbitsa Mountain of the Balkan Mountains, some 2.5 km west of the Rish Pass. It flows eastwards in the wide Rish Valley until the village of Veselinovo. The river then bends north and forest a gorge between the Dragoevska Mountain to the west and the northern slopes of the Varbitsa Mountain to the east. South of the town of Smyadovo it enters the Smyadovo Field, where its valley widens again and is covered with farmlands. It flows into the Golyama Kamchiya at an altitude of 54 m about 3.7 km east of Smyadovo.

Its drainage basin covers a territory of 175 km^{2} or 3.3% of the Kamchiya's total. The Brestova reka has predominantly rain–snow feed with high water in March and low water in September–October.

The river flows entirely in Shumen Province. There is one settlement along its course, the village of Veselinovo in Smyadovo Municipality. The river's waters are utilised mostly for irrigation.

A 16.7 km stretch of the second class II-73 road Shumen–Karnobat follows its course between Smyadovo and the junction to the village of Rish.
