= Pchelin =

Pchelin (Bulgarian: Пчелин) may refer to the following places in Bulgaria:

- Pchelin, Burgas Province
- Pchelin, Sofia Province
