= Saedinenie =

Saedinenie may refer to:

- Saedinenie Municipality, Plovdiv Province, Bulgaria
- Saedinenie, Plovdiv Province - a town in the Saedinenie Municipality of the Plovdiv Province, Bulgaria
- Saedinenie, Burgas Province - a village in the Sungurlare Municipality of the Burgas Province, Bulgaria
- Saedinenie, Stara Zagora Province - a village in the Bratya Daskalovi Municipality of the Stara Zagora Province, Bulgaria
- Saedinenie, Targovishte Province - a village in the Targovishte Municipality of the Targovishte Province, Bulgaria
- Saedinenie Snowfield, a glacier in Antarctica
