= Vedrovo =

- Village
- Location within Bulgaria
- Coordinates: 42°50′N 26°59′E
- Country: Bulgaria
- Province: Burgas Province
- Municipality: Sungurlare Municipality
- Time zone: UTC+2 (EET)
  - Summer (DST): UTC+3 (EEST)

Vedrovo is a village in Sungurlare Municipality, in Burgas Province, in southeastern Bulgaria.

== Geography ==
Vedrovo is located in the foothills of the Eastern Balkan Mountains, in Sungurlare Municipality, Burgas Province, southeastern Bulgaria. The village lies at an elevation of 200–299 m. The Potomitsa River flows through the village and is a tributary of the Luda Kamchiya, which flows into the Kamchiya.
