= Ognen =

Coordinates: 42°42′N 26°49′E

Ognen Danov
- Village
- Interactive map of Ognen Danov
- Country: Bulgaria
- Province: Burgas Province
- Municipality: Karnobat Municipality
- Time zone: UTC+2 (EET)
  - Summer (DST): UTC+3 (EEST)

Ognen is a village in Karnobat Municipality, in Burgas Province, in southeastern Bulgaria.

== Honours ==
Ognen Cove on Trinity Peninsula, Antarctica is named after the village.
