= Vezenkovo =

Vezenkovo Веженково
- Village
- Location within Bulgaria
- Coordinates: 42°51′N 26°42′E
- Country: Bulgaria
- Province: Burgas Province
- Municipality: Sungurlare Municipality
- Elevation: 321 m (1,053 ft)

Population
  - Total: 357
- Time zone: UTC+2 (EET)
  - Summer (DST): UTC+3 (EEST)
- Postal code: 8457

Vezenkovo is a village in Sungurlare Municipality, in Burgas Province, in Southeast Bulgaria. It has 357 residents and is approximately 2.5 km (1.6 mi) north of Beronovo and is 7 km (4.3 mi) east of a former Soviet nuclear warhead facility near Dabovitsa.
