= Devetintsi =

Coordinates: 42°36′N 26°50′E

- Village
- Interactive map of Devetintsi
- Country: Bulgaria
- Province: Burgas Province
- Municipality: Karnobat Municipality
- Time zone: UTC+2 (EET)
  - Summer (DST): UTC+3 (EEST)

Devetintsi is a village in Karnobat Municipality, in Burgas Province, in southeastern Bulgaria.
