= Tsonevo Reservoir =

Reservoir in Varna Province, Bulgaria

Tsonevo Dam
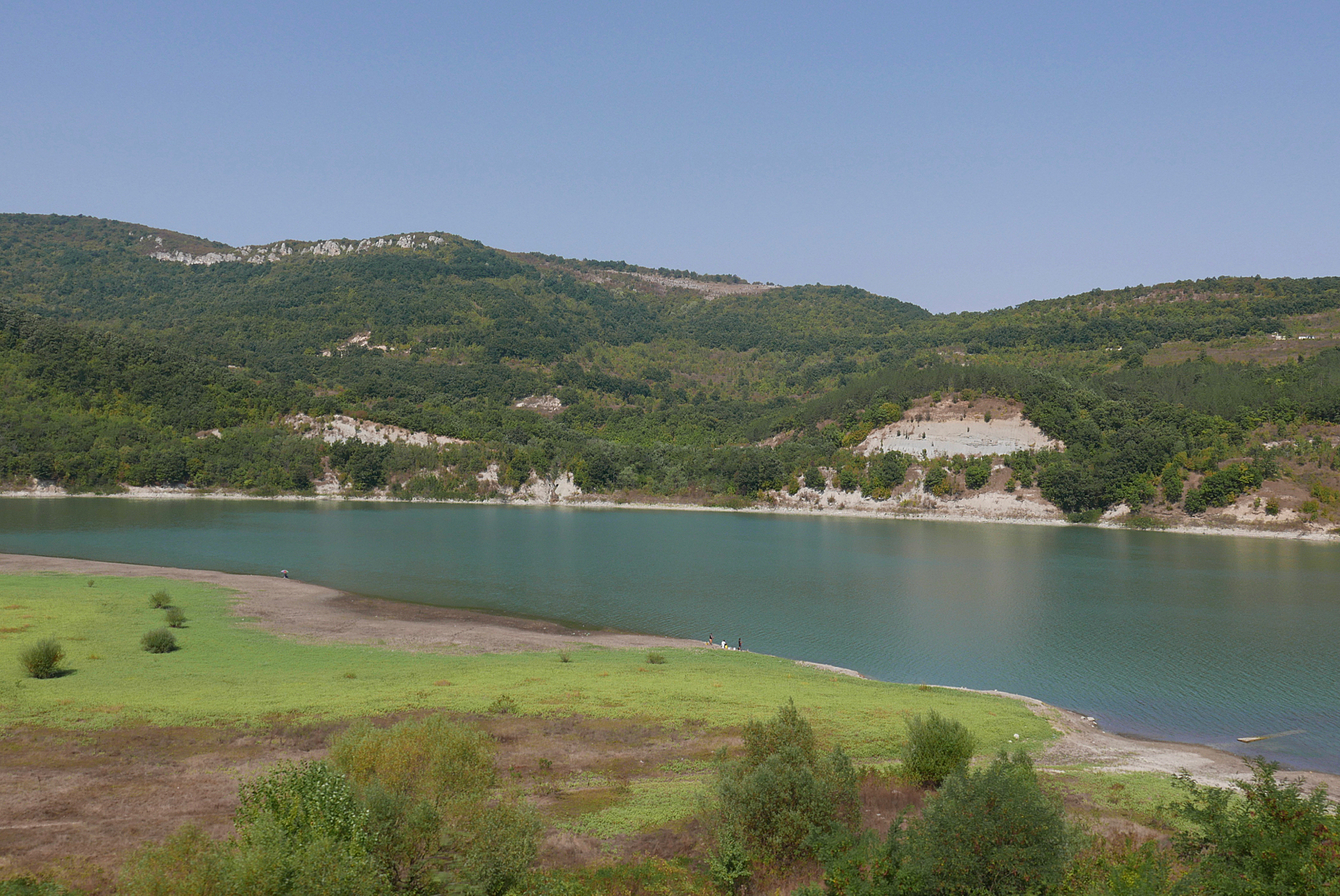

- Location of Tsonevo Reservoir in Bulgaria
- Official name: Язовир Цонево (Bulgarian)
- Location: Balkan Mountains at Tsonevo
- Coordinates: 42°59′48″N 27°24′19″E
- Opening date: 1974

Dam and spillways
- Type of dam: earthen gravity dam
- Height: 39 m (128 ft)
- Length: 890 m (2,920 ft)

Reservoir
- Creates: Tsonevo Reservoir
- Total capacity: 330,000,000 m^{3} (270,000 acre⋅ft)
- Surface area: 17.3 km^{2} (4,300 acres)

Tsonevo Reservoir (Bulgarian: язовир Цонево) is a reservoir in eastern Bulgaria, located in the valley of the river Luda Kamchiya. Administratively, it lies in Dalgopol Municipality of Varna Province. In 1975 it was named after the politician Georgi Traykov, a longtime leader of Bulgarian Agrarian National Union and that name remains in official use, along with Tsonevo.

== Geography ==
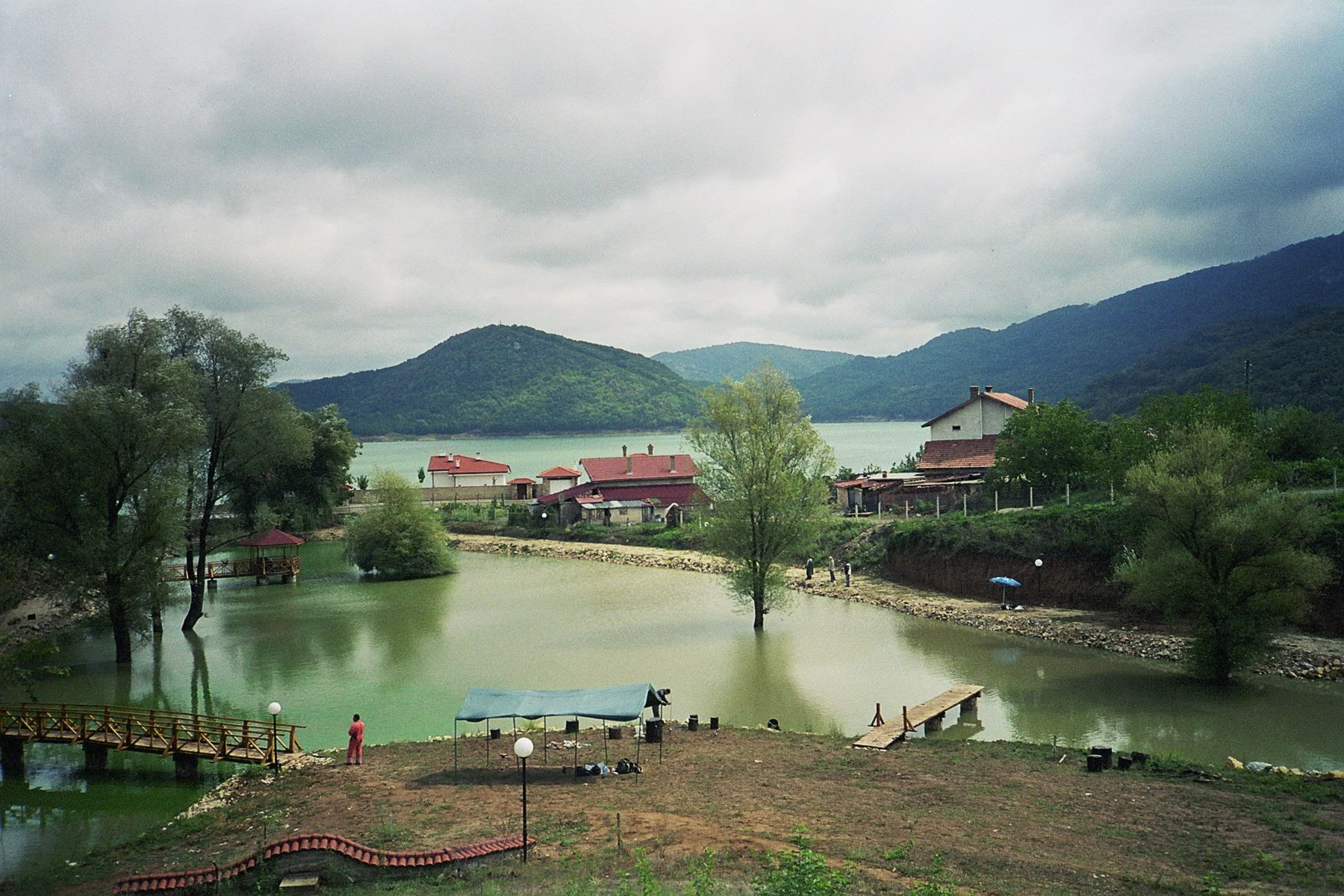
A view of Tsonevo Reservoir

The reservoir is situated at an altitude of 185 m the eastern Balkan Mountains on the boundary with the fore-Balkan hilly area. It lies along the lower course of the river Luda Kamchiya, the longest tributary of the Kamchiya. The dam wall is a kilometer west of the village of Tsonevo. It is accessible via several roads, as well as railway line No. 3 Sofia–Karlovo–Varna. Along its shores at the reservoir's tail is located the peculiar rock formation Chudnite Skali, which are a natural landmark. The picturesque surroundings and forests are a popular tourist attraction, offering conditions for recreation, fishing and outdoors activities. Accommodation facilities are mainly concentrated in the adjacent villages of Tsonevo and Asparuhovo.

== Description ==
The reservoir was inaugurated in 1974 and has an earthen dam with a height of 39 m and crest length of 890 m. The artificial lake has a surface area of 17.3 km^{2} and a volume of 330 million m^{3}; its length is 28 km. It serves as a leveler of the Kamchiya Reservoir further upstream. It is utilized for small-scale electricity production and as a major supplier for irrigation and industrial water, including for the major Varna-Devnya Industrial Complex. Although its waters are generally intended for industrial and agricultural supply, Tsonevo Reservoir is designated as an emergency source of potable water for Varna, the third largest city in Bulgaria.

== Gallery ==
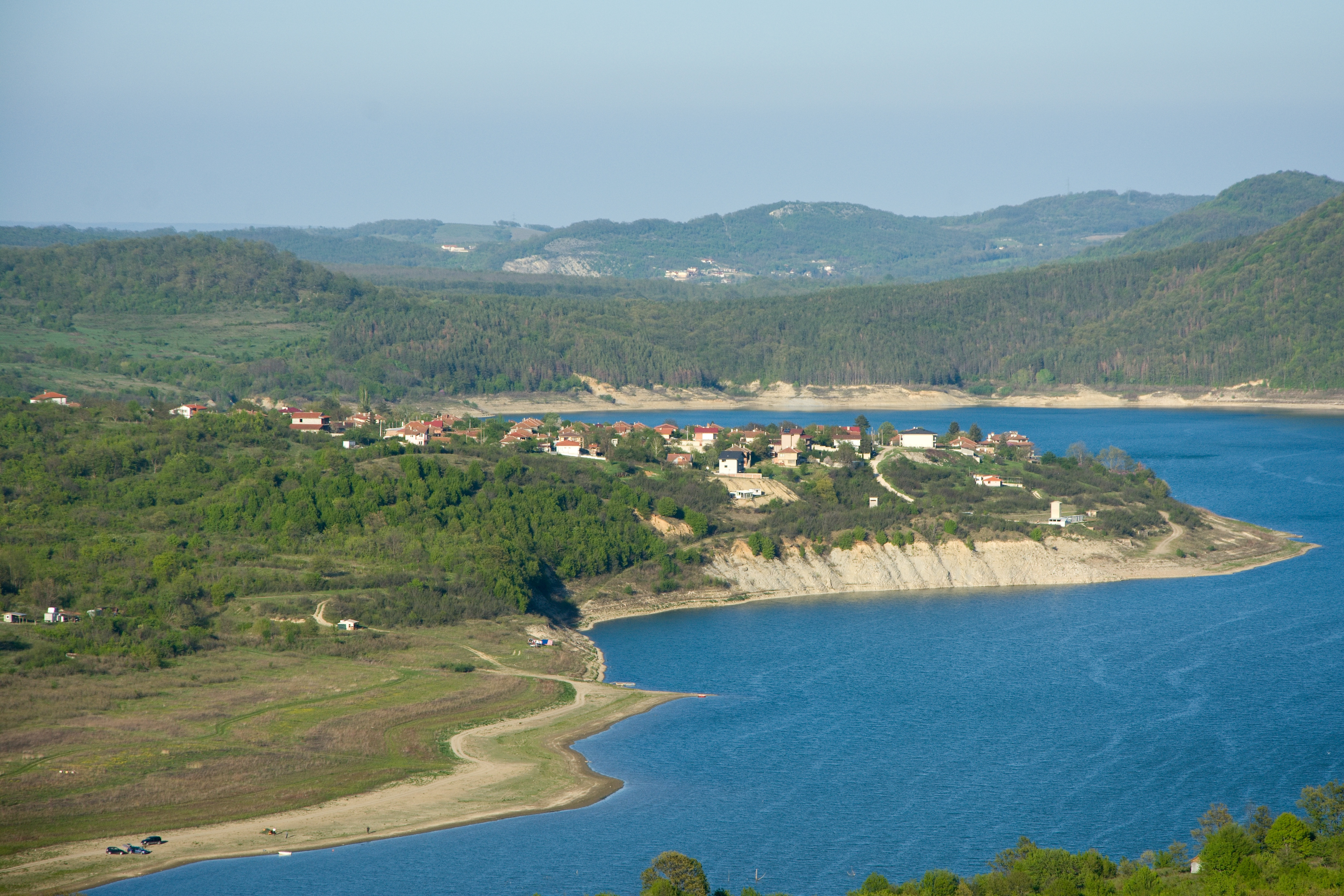
The reservoir at Asparuhovo

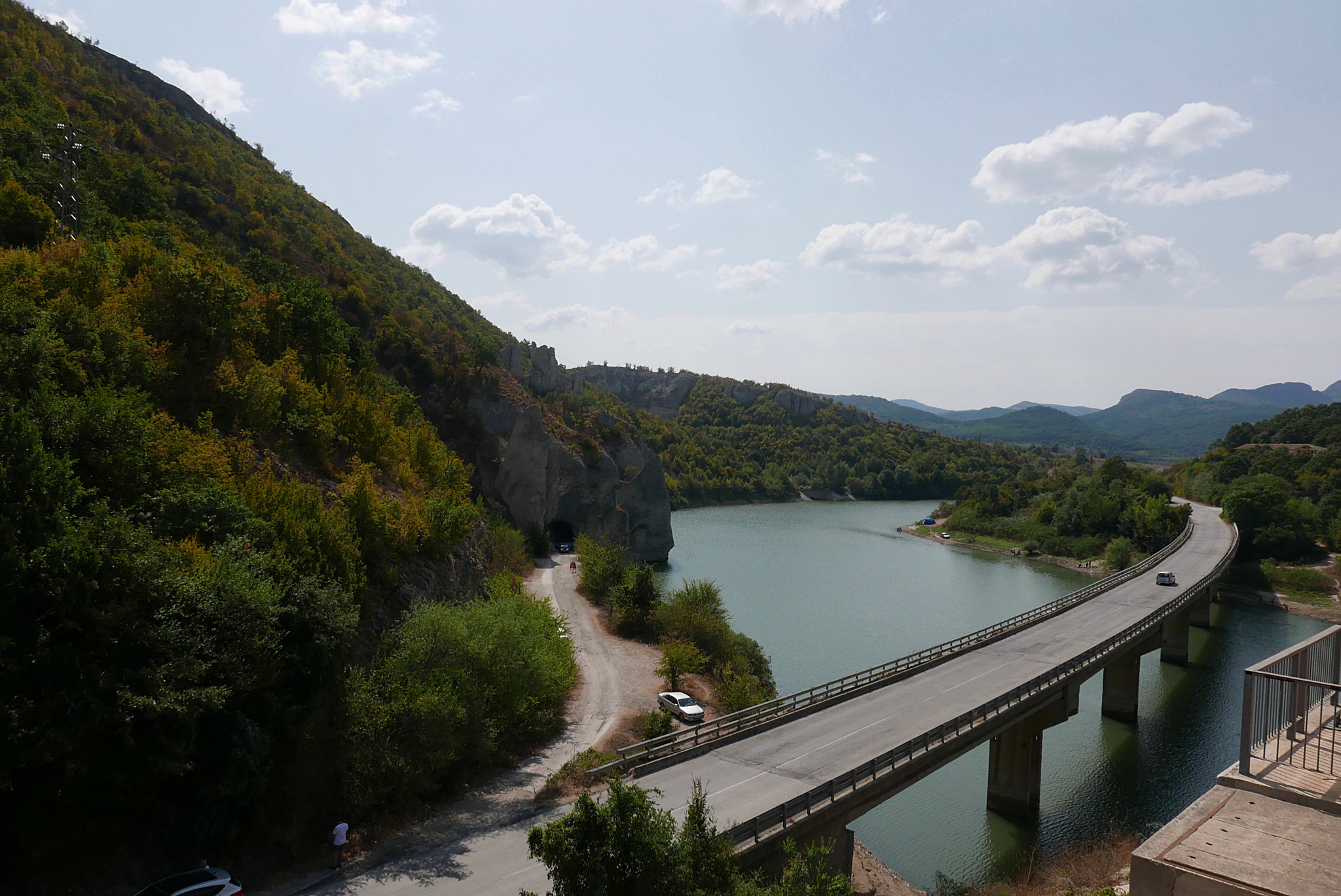
A road bridge at the reservoir's tail

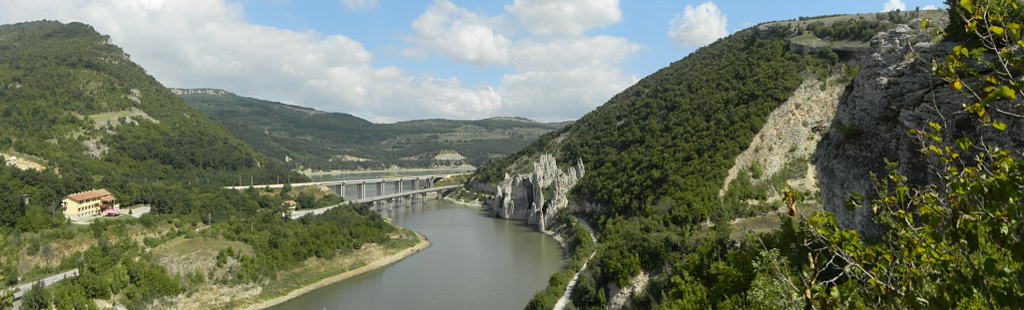
Panoramic view at Chudnite Skali
