= Dalgopol Municipality =

Dalgopol Municipality Община Дългопол
- Municipality
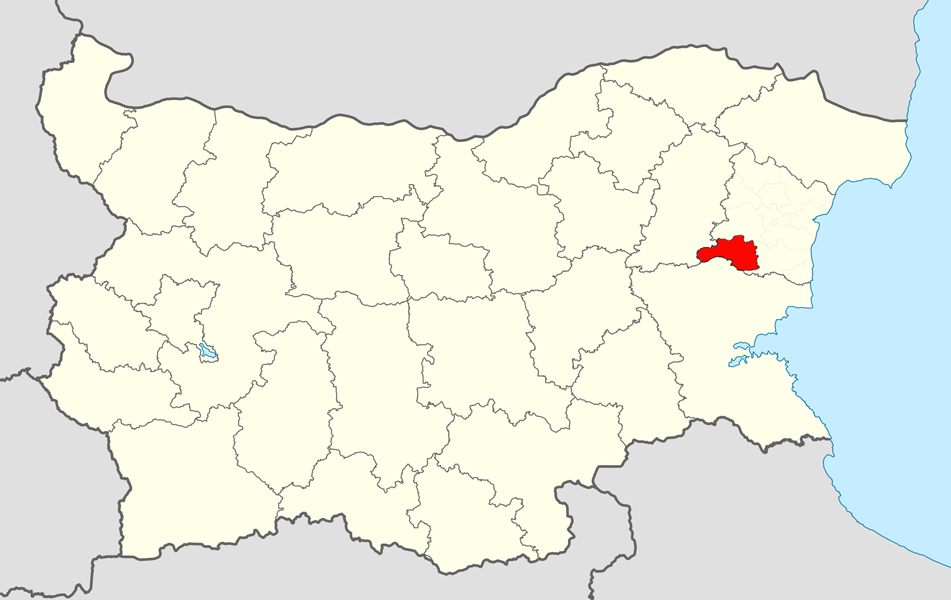
- Dalgopol Municipality within Bulgaria and Varna Province.
- Coordinates: 43°0′N 27°20′E
- Country: Bulgaria
- Province (Oblast): Varna
- Admin. centre (Obshtinski tsentar): Dalgopol

Area
  - Total: 442 km^{2} (171 sq mi)

Population (December 2009)
  - Total: 14,364
  - Density: 32.5/km^{2} (84.2/sq mi)
- Time zone: UTC+2 (EET)
  - Summer (DST): UTC+3 (EEST)

Dalgopol Municipality (Bulgarian: Община Дългопол) is a municipality (obshtina) in Varna Province, Northeastern Bulgaria. It is named after its administrative centre - the town of Dalgopol.

The municipality embraces a territory of 442 km^{2} (171 sq mi) with a population, as of December 2009, of 14,364 inhabitants. The area contains the Tsonevo Reservoir - the third biggest in the country, developed along the Luda Kamchiya river which is the main tributary of Kamchiya river that crosses the municipality from west to east.

== Settlements ==
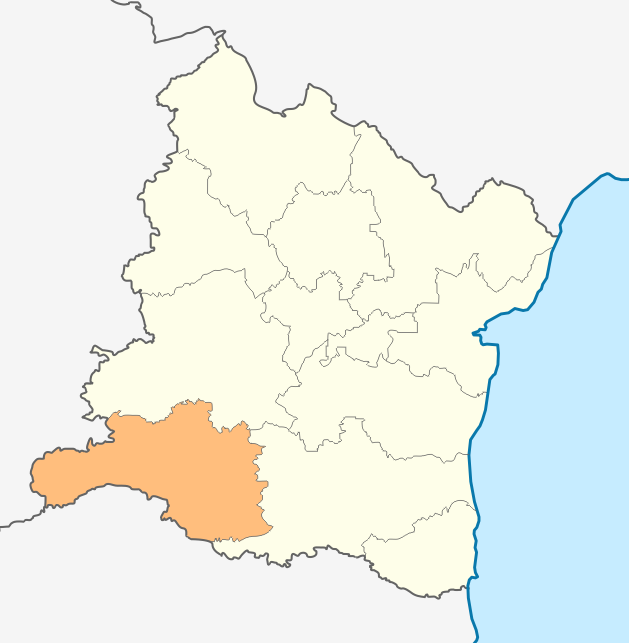
Dalgopol Municipality within Varna Province

Dalgopol Municipality includes the following 16 places (towns are shown in bold):

Town/Village	Cyrillic	Population (December 2009)
**Dalgopol**	**Дългопол**	4,829
Arkovna	Арковна	98
Asparuhovo	Аспарухово	652
Boryana	Боряна	283
Kamen Dyal	Камен дял	217
Komunari	Комунари	103
Krasimir	Красимир	85
Lopushna	Лопушна	909
Medovets	Медовец	1,689
Partizani	Партизани	1,113
Polyatsite	Поляците	833
Royak	Рояк	259
Sava	Сава	272
Sladka Voda	Сладка вода	49
Tsonevo	Цонево	2,403
Velichkovo	Величково	557
Total		14,364

== Demography ==
The following table shows the change of the population during the last four decades.

Dalgopol Municipality
**Year**	1975	1985	1992	**2001**	2005	2007	2009	**2011**
**Population**	18,797	18,232	16,514	15,902	15,002	14,700	14,364	...
Sources: Census 2001, Census 2011, „pop-stat.mashke.org“,

=== Religion ===
According to the latest Bulgarian census of 2011, the religious composition, among those who answered the optional question on religious identification, was the following:

Religious composition of Dalgopol Municipality
Orthodox Christianity	41.7%
Catholicism	0.0%
Protestantism	0.4%
Islam	49.5%
No religion	0.7%
Prefer not to answer, others and indefinable	7.7%

The municipality of Dalgopol has a mixed religious composition. At the 2011 census, 49.5% of respondents identified as Muslims and 41.7% as Orthodox Christians belonging to the Bulgarian Orthodox Church.

== See also ==
- Provinces of Bulgaria
- Municipalities of Bulgaria
- List of cities and towns in Bulgaria
