= Kosten, Bulgaria =

Kosten
- Village
- Location within Bulgaria
- Coordinates: 42°47′00″N 26°57′20″E
- Country: Bulgaria
- Province: Burgas Province
- Municipality: Sungurlare Municipality
- Time zone: UTC+2 (EET)
  - Summer (DST): UTC+3 (EEST)

Kosten is a village in Sungurlare Municipality, in Burgas Province, in southeastern Bulgaria.
