= Royak =

Royak Рояк
- Village
- Location in Bulgaria
- Coordinates: 43°05′08″N 27°22′57″E
- Country: Bulgaria
- Province: Varna Province
- Municipality: Dalgopol Municipality

Area
  - Total: 18.47 km^{2} (7.13 sq mi)

Population (2020)
  - Total: 263
- Time zone: UTC+2 (EET)
  - Summer (DST): UTC+3 (EEST)

Royak is a village in Dalgopol Municipality, in Varna Province, eastern Bulgaria.

== Nursing home fire ==
On 22 November 2021, a fire at a local nursing home killed nine of its 58 elderly residents, while the rest were evacuated. An investigation was launched into the cause of the fire, although the Interior Ministry stated that the flames “started from the roof of the building.”

A three-day national mourning was declared in the country in memory of the fire's victims and the forty-six people killed a day later in a bus crash at Bosnek, Pernik Province. Approximately a month after the fire, on 21 December 2021, four youths were given the Presidential Medal of Honor by President Rumen Radev for their efforts to save the nursing home's residents from the flames.

== See also ==
- List of villages in Bulgaria
