= Devetak, Lukavac =

Devetak
- Village
- Location within Bosnia and Herzegovina
- Coordinates: 44.5496222°N 18.440895°E
- Country: Bosnia and Herzegovina
- Entity: Federation of Bosnia and Herzegovina
- Canton: Tuzla
- Municipality: Lukavac

Area
  - Total: 3.33 sq mi (8.62 km^{2})

Population (2013)
  - Total: 2,169
  - Density: 652/sq mi (252/km^{2})

Devetak is a village in the municipality of Lukavac, Bosnia and Herzegovina.

== Demographics ==
According to the 2013 census, its population was 2,169.

Ethnicity in 2013
Ethnicity	Number	Percentage
Bosniaks	2,098	96.7%
Croats	3	0.1%
other/undeclared	68	3.1%
Total	2,169	100%
