= Podvis, Burgas Province =

Podvis
- Village
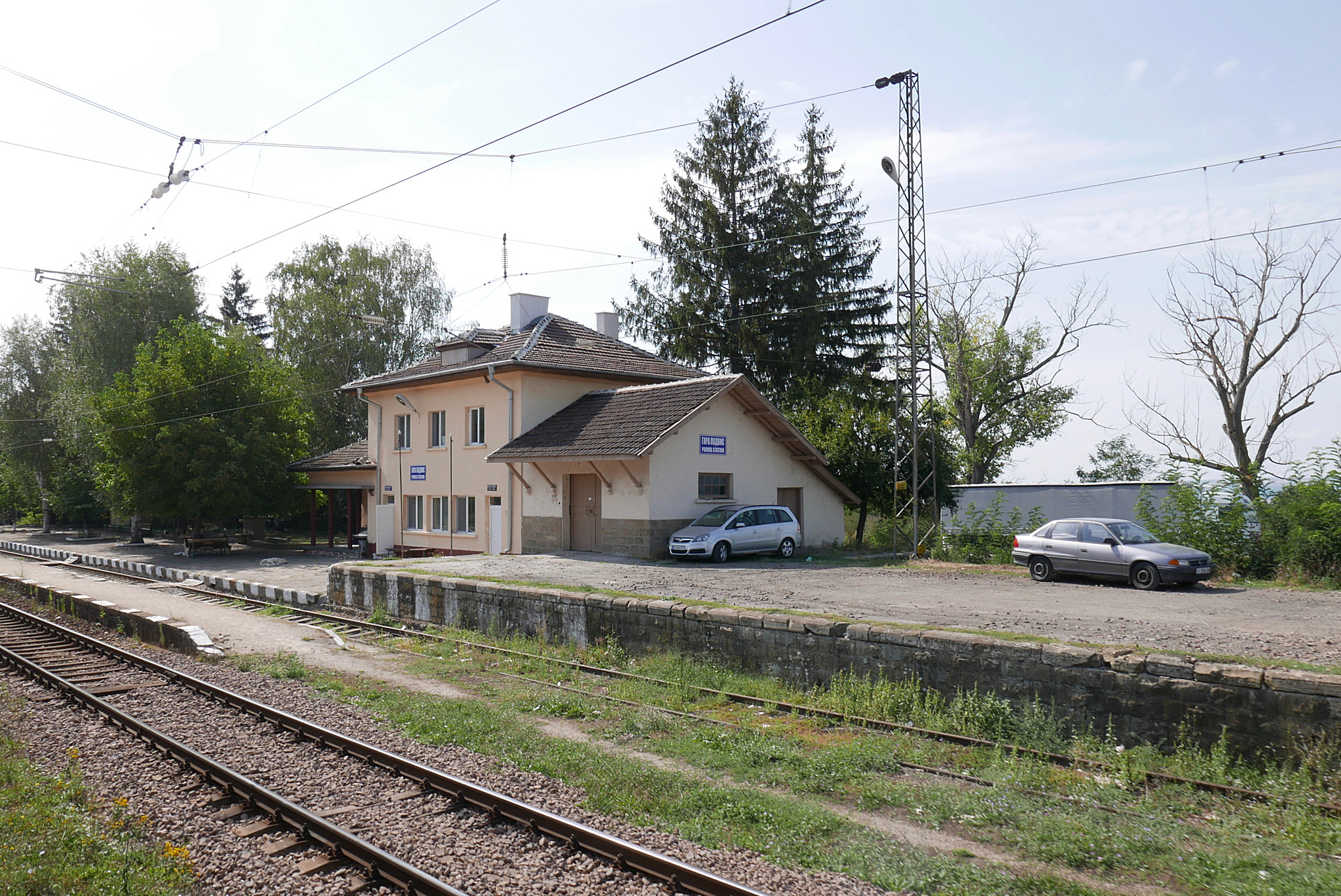

- Location in Bulgaria
- Coordinates: 42.838°N 26.846°E
- Country: Bulgaria
- Province: Burgas Province
- Municipality: Sungurlare Municipality
- Time zone: UTC+2 (EET)
  - Summer (DST): UTC+3 (EEST)

Podvis is a village in Sungurlare Municipality, in Burgas Province, in southeastern Bulgaria.

Podvis Col on Davis Coast in Antarctica is named after the village.
