= Medovets =

Medovets Медовец
- Village
- Location in Bulgaria
- Coordinates: 43.005484°N 27.132654°E
- Country: Bulgaria
- Province: Varna Province
- Municipality: Dalgopol Municipality

Population (2016)
  - Total: 1,617
- Time zone: UTC+2 (EET)
  - Summer (DST): UTC+3 (EEST)

Medovets is a village in Dalgopol Municipality, in Varna Province, eastern Bulgaria.
