= Bosilkovo, Burgas Province =

Bosilkovo
- Village
- Location in Bulgaria
- Coordinates: 42.821°N 27.006°E
- Country: Bulgaria
- Province: Burgas Province
- Municipality: Sungurlare Municipality

Population (2011)
  - Total: 83
- Time zone: UTC+2 (EET)
  - Summer (DST): UTC+3 (EEST)

Bosilkovo is a village in Sungurlare Municipality, in Burgas Province, in southeastern Bulgaria. Most inhabitants are Pomaks.
