= Velislav, Burgas Province =

Velislav
- Village
- Location within Bulgaria
- Coordinates: 42°52′N 26°46′E
- Country: Bulgaria
- Province: Burgas Province
- Municipality: Sungurlare Municipality
- Time zone: UTC+2 (EET)
  - Summer (DST): UTC+3 (EEST)

Velislav (Bulgarian: Велислав [vɛliˈsɫaf]) is a village in Sungurlare Municipality, in Burgas Province, in southeastern Bulgaria.
