= Esen, Bulgaria =

- Village
- Location within Bulgaria
- Coordinates: 42°50′N 26°47′E
- Country: Bulgaria
- Province: Burgas Province
- Municipality: Sungurlare Municipality

Area
  - Total: 29.081 km^{2} (11.228 sq mi)

Population (2013)
  - Total: 74
- Time zone: UTC+2 (EET)
  - Summer (DST): UTC+3 (EEST)

Esen, Bulgaria is a village in Sungurlare Municipality, in Burgas Province, in southeastern Bulgaria.
