= Luda Kamchiya Gorge =

Coordinates: 42°53′43.2″N 27°11′31.89″E

The Luda Kamchiya Gorge is a gorge in the Balkan Mountains (Stara Planina) in Bulgaria. It connects Dalgopol and Karnobat.

The road and railroad follow the course of the Kamchiya River. This is one of the important railway routes between northern and southern Bulgaria.
