= Grozden =

- Village
- Location within Bulgaria
- Coordinates: 42°43′N 26°45′E
- Country: Bulgaria
- Province: Burgas Province
- Municipality: Sungurlare Municipality
- Time zone: UTC+2 (EET)
  - Summer (DST): UTC+3 (EEST)

Grozden is a village in Sungurlare Municipality, in Burgas Province, in southeastern Bulgaria.

== Honours ==
Grozden Peak on Fallières Coast, Antarctica is named after the village.

== Notable people ==
- Maria Zheleva (1942–2013), historian, film editor, film director, screenwriter and First Lady of Bulgaria
