= Velichkovo, Varna Province =

Velichkovo Величково
- Village
- Location in Bulgaria
- Coordinates: 43°2′56.202″N 27°26′38.738″E
- Country: Bulgaria
- Province: Varna Province
- Municipality: Dalgopol Municipality

Area
  - Total: 13.48 km^{2} (5.20 sq mi)

Population (2020)
  - Total: 596
- Time zone: UTC+2 (EET)
  - Summer (DST): UTC+3 (EEST)

Velichkovo is a village located in Dalgopol Municipality, in Varna Province, eastern Bulgaria.
