= Chernitsa, Burgas Province =

Chernitsa Черница
- Village
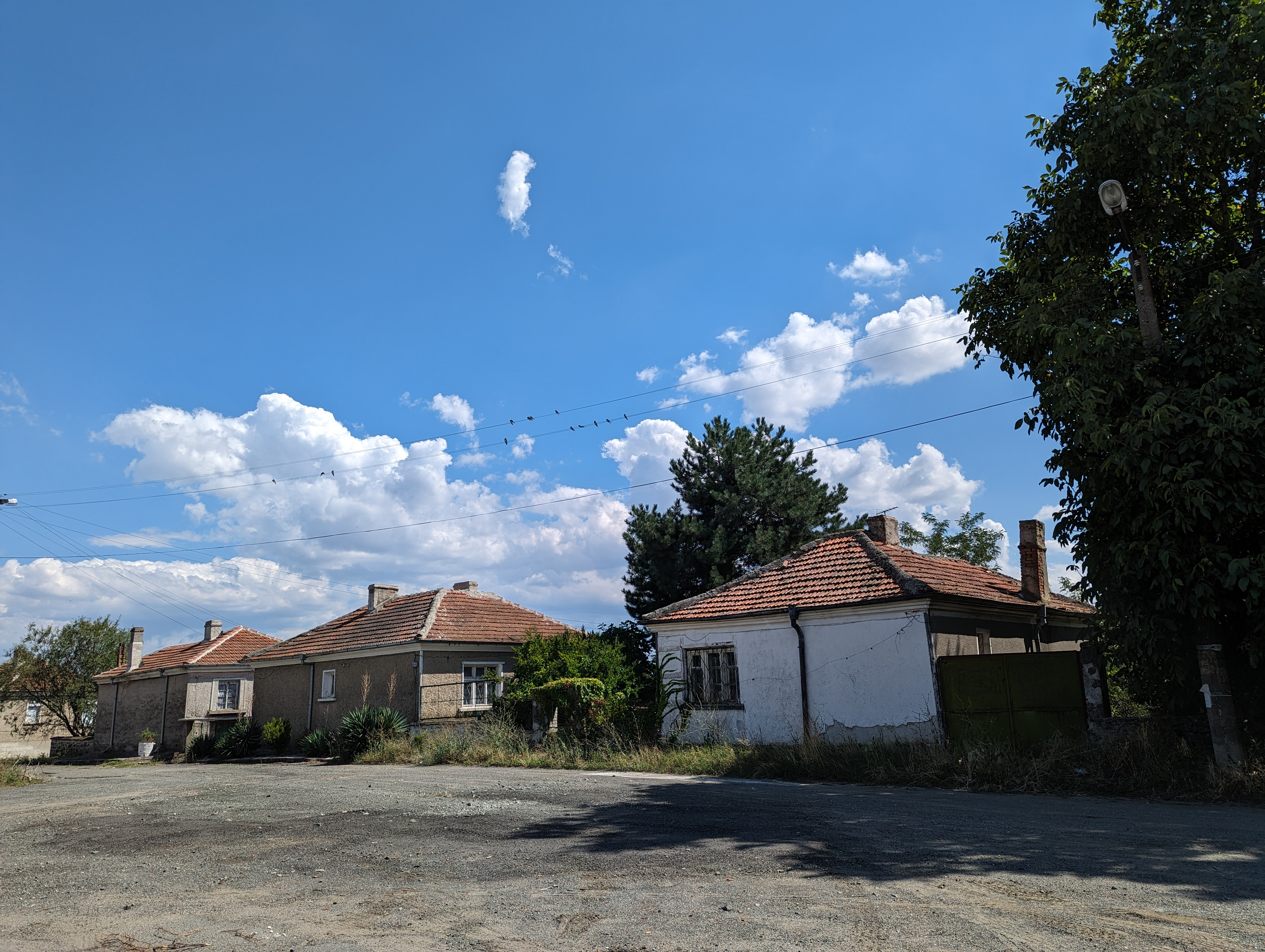

- Location within Bulgaria
- Coordinates: 42°46′N 26°49′E
- Country: Bulgaria
- Province: Burgas Province
- Municipality: Sungurlare Municipality
- Time zone: UTC+2 (EET)
  - Summer (DST): UTC+3 (EEST)

Chernitsa is a village in Sungurlare Municipality, in Burgas Province, in southeastern Bulgaria.
