= Manolich =

- Village
- Location within Bulgaria
- Coordinates: 42°52′N 26°48′E
- Country: Bulgaria
- Province: Burgas Province
- Municipality: Sungurlare Municipality

Population (2011)
  - Total: 1,211
- Time zone: UTC+2 (EET)
  - Summer (DST): UTC+3 (EEST)

Manolich is a village in Sungurlare Municipality, in Burgas Province, in southeastern Bulgaria. As of 2011, the village of Manolich has 1211 inhabitants, most of whom are Turkish while a few are Pomaks. The main religion is Islam.
