= Rish Pass =

Mountain pass in Bulgaria

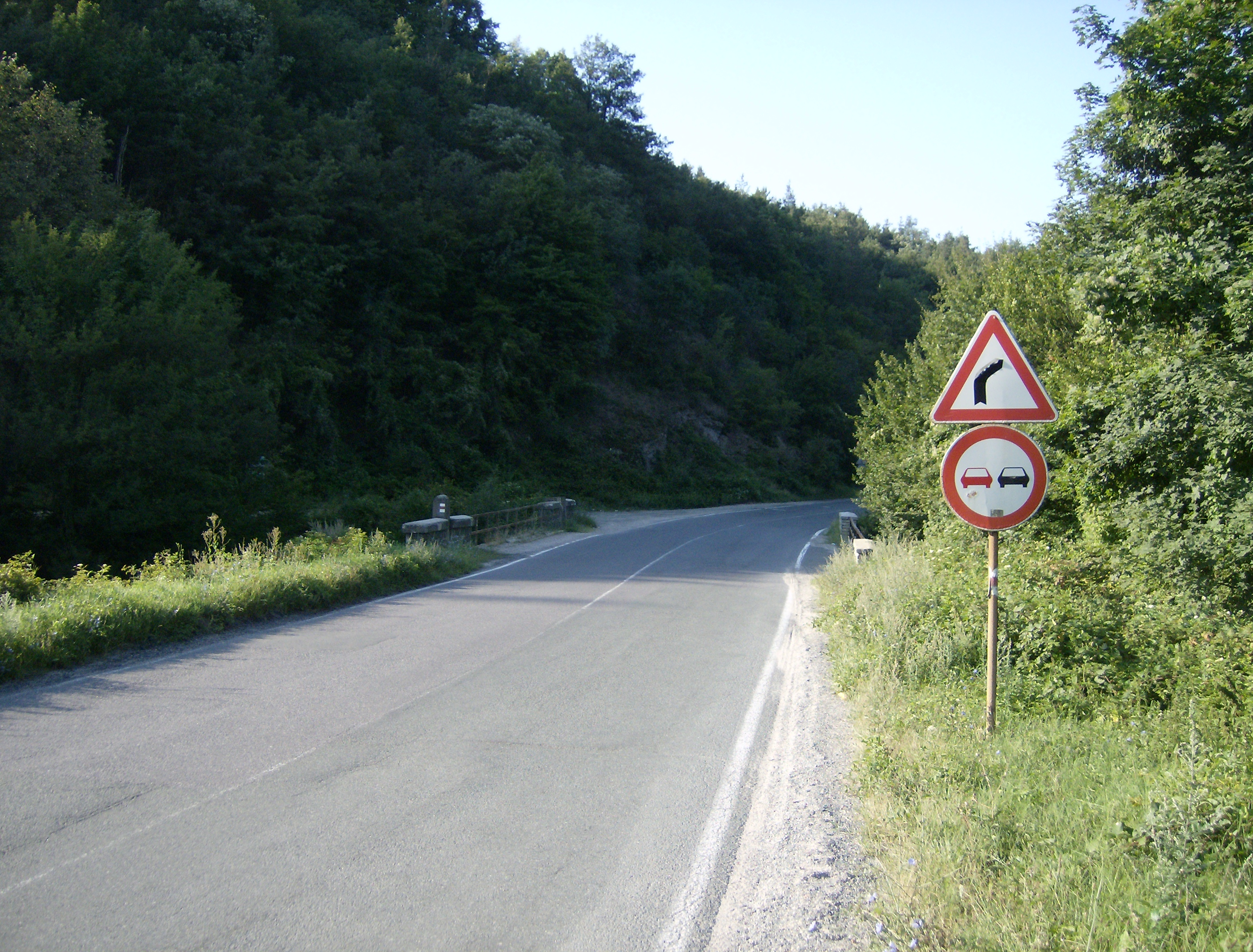
- Interactive map of Rish Pass
- Elevation: 400 m (1,300 ft)
- Traversed by: Road

Location
- Location: Bulgaria
- Range: Balkan Mountains
- Coordinates: 42°56′14″N 26°56′22″E

Rish Pass (Bulgarian: Ришки проход, Rishki Prohod) is a mountain pass in the Balkan Mountains (Stara Planina) in Bulgaria. It connects Shumen and Karnobat. On the Shumen side of the pass is the village of Rish.

The Battle of the Rishki Pass was fought here in 759 between Bulgarians and Byzantines which resulted in a Bulgarian victory.
