= Tsonevo =

Tsonevo Цонево
- Village
- Location in Bulgaria
- Coordinates: 43.030381°N 27.438740°E
- Country: Bulgaria
- Province: Varna Province
- Municipality: Dalgopol Municipality

Population (2016)
  - Total: 2 344
- Time zone: UTC+2 (EET)
  - Summer (DST): UTC+3 (EEST)

Tsonevo (Цонево) is a village located in the Luda Kamchiya Valley in Dalgopol Municipality, Varna Province, Bulgaria.
