= Kamchia, Burgas Province =

Kamchia Камчия
- Village
- Location of Kamchia
- Coordinates: 42°53′09″N 26°58′08″E
- Country: Bulgaria
- Province (Oblast): Burgas
- Municipality (Obshtina): Sungurlare Municipality

Government
  - Mayor: Giorgi Stefanov Kenov (Democrats for a Strong Bulgaria)
- Elevation: 173 m (568 ft)

Population
  - Total: 100
- Demonym(s): Kamchietz, (Камчиец)
- Time zone: UTC+2 (EET)
  - Summer (DST): UTC+3 (EEST)
- Postal Code: 8434
- Area code: 05575

Kamchia (Bulgarian: Камчия) is a village in eastern Bulgaria, located in Sungurlare Municipality of the Burgas Province. It lies on the river Luda Kamchia along the provincial road 7305. It currently does not have its own mayor but instead is governed by the municipal mayor Stefan Kenov.
