= Zavet, Burgas Province =

Zavet
- Village
- Location in Bulgaria
- Coordinates: 42°50′05″N 27°03′55″E
- Country: Bulgaria
- Province: Burgas Province
- Municipality: Sungurlare Municipality
- Time zone: UTC+2 (EET)
  - Summer (DST): UTC+3 (EEST)

Zavet is a village in Sungurlare Municipality, Burgas Province, in southeastern Bulgaria.
