= Sungurlare Municipality =

Coordinates: 42.8000°N 27.2830°E

Sungurlare Municipality Община Сунгурларе
- Municipality (Obshtina)
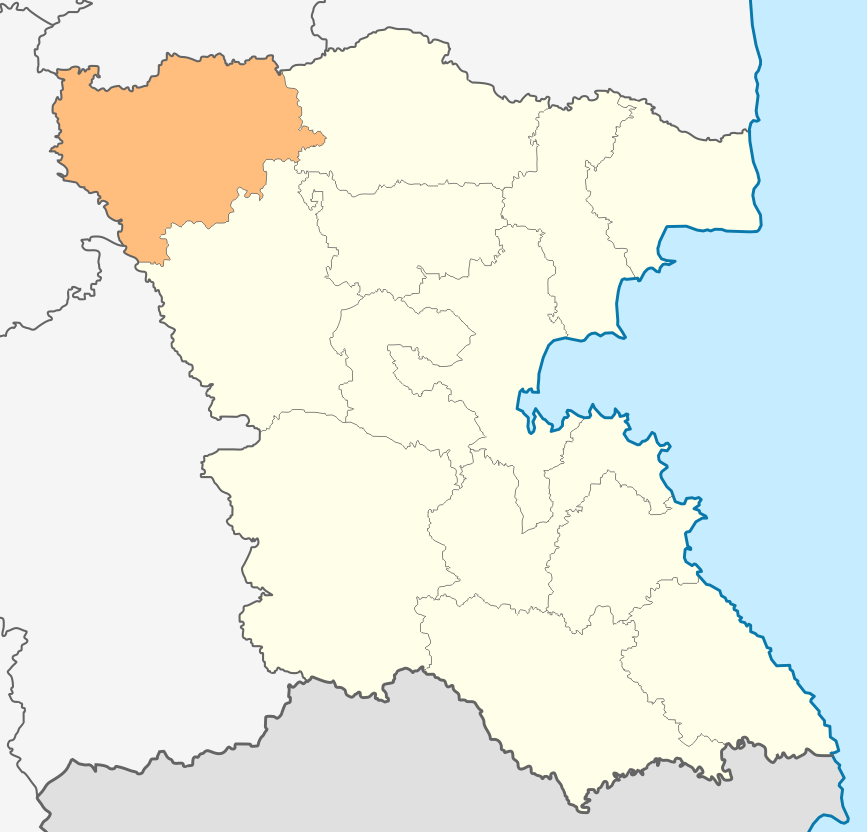
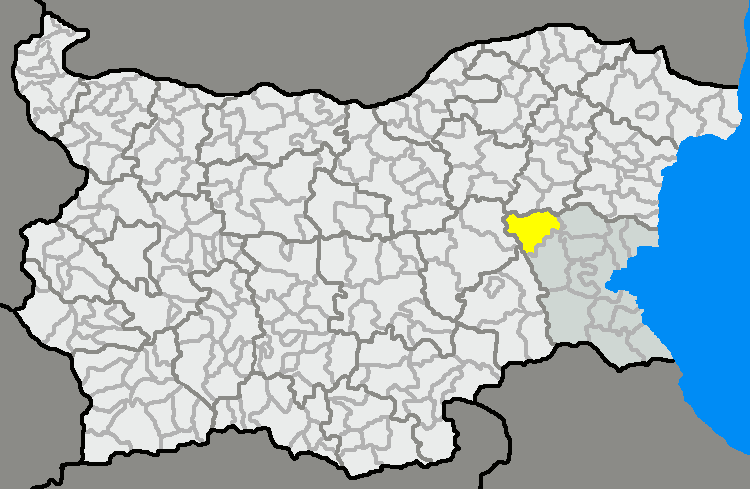
- Location in Burgas province Location on map of Bulgaria
- Country: Bulgaria
- Province (Oblast): Burgas
- Seat: Sungurlare

Area
  - Total: 794.97 km^{2} (306.94 sq mi)

Population (2011)
  - Total: 12,559
  - Density: 15.798/km^{2} (40.917/sq mi)
- Time zone: UTC+2 (EET)
  - Summer (DST): UTC+3 (EEST)

Sungurlare Municipality (Bulgarian: Община Сунгурларе, Obshtina Sungurlare) is a municipality in Burgas Province, Bulgaria. It includes the town of Sungurlare and a number of villages with a total population of 12,559 as of 2011.

== Demographics ==
=== Religion ===
According to the latest Bulgarian census of 2011, the religious composition, among those who answered the optional question on religious identification, was the following:

Religious composition of Sungurlare Municipality
Orthodox Christianity	47.7%
Catholicism	0.4%
Protestantism	1.5%
Islam	29.9%
No religion	11.7%
Prefer not to answer, others and indefinable	8.8%

== Settlements ==
Sungurlare Municipality incorporates the following 28 settlements:

- Sungurlare
- Beronovo
- Bosilkovo
- Vedrovo
- Vezenkovo
- Velislav
- Valchin
- Gorovo
- Grozden
- Dabovitsa
- Esen
- Zavet
- Kamchia
- Klimash
- Kosten
- Lozarevo
- Lozitsa
- Manolich
- Podvis
- Prilep
- Pchelin
- Sadovo
- Skala
- Slavyantsi
- Saedinenie
- Terziysko
- Chernitsa
- Chubra
