= Saedinenie, Burgas Province =

Saedinenie
- Village
- Location in Bulgaria
- Coordinates: 42°52′30″N 27°01′35″E
- Country: Bulgaria
- Province: Burgas Province
- Municipality: Sungurlare Municipality
- Time zone: UTC+2 (EET)
  - Summer (DST): UTC+3 (EEST)

Saedinenie is a village in Sungurlare Municipality, in Burgas Province, in southeastern Bulgaria.
