= Lozarevo =

- Village
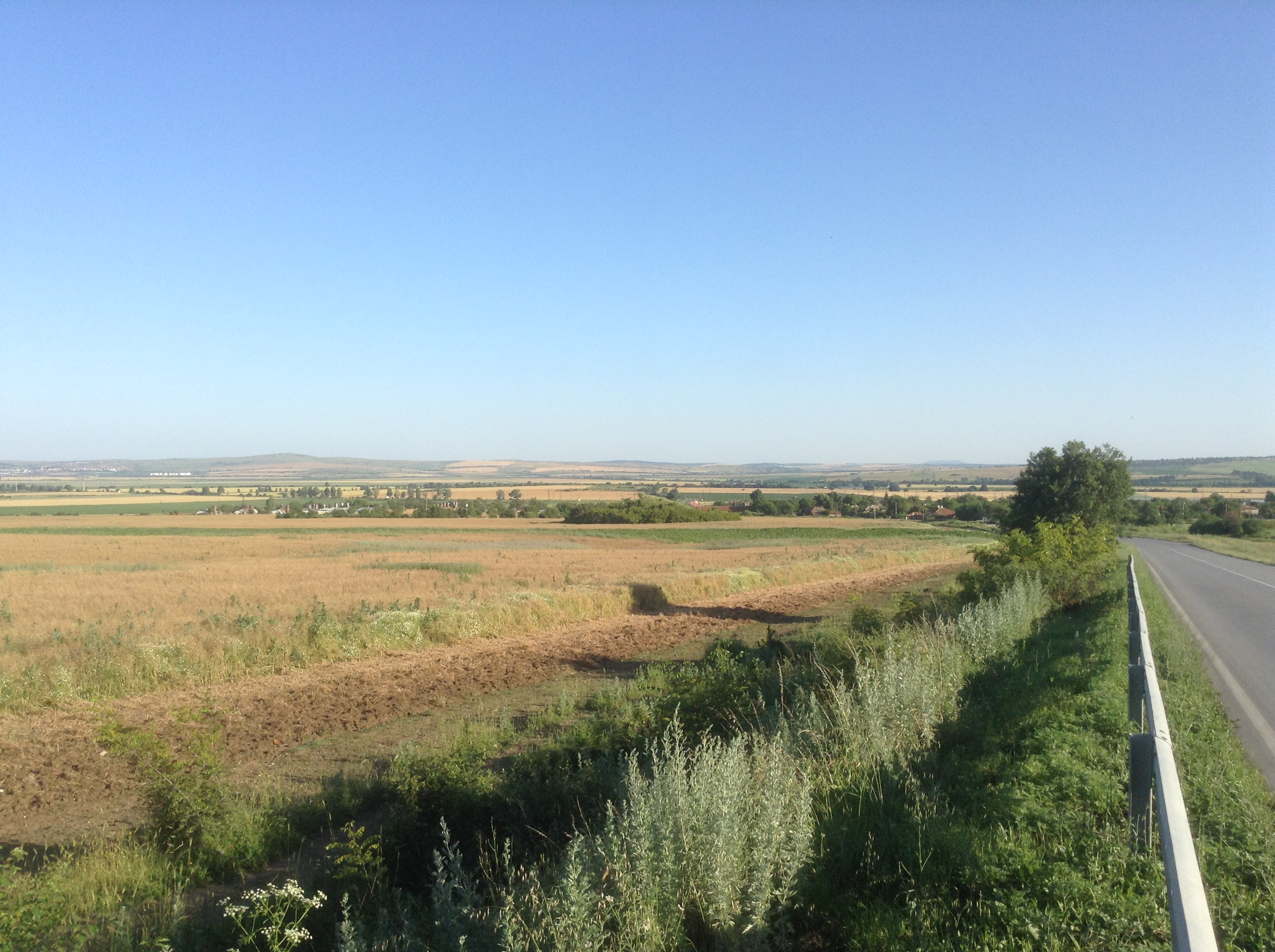
- Field by the roadside of Lozarevo

- Location within Bulgaria
- Coordinates: 42°46′N 26°53′E
- Country: Bulgaria
- Province: Burgas Province
- Municipality: Sungurlare Municipality
- Time zone: UTC+2 (EET)
  - Summer (DST): UTC+3 (EEST)

Lozarevo (Bulgarian: Лозарево [ɫoˈzarɛvo]) is a village in Sungurlare Municipality, in Burgas Province, in southeastern Bulgaria.

It is identified by modern scholars with the medieval fortress town of Goloe (Greek: Γολόη).
