= Dabovitsa =

- Village
- Location in Bulgaria
- Coordinates: 42°48′30″N 26°37′40″E
- Country: Bulgaria
- Province: Burgas Province
- Municipality: Sungurlare Municipality
- Time zone: UTC+2 (EET)
  - Summer (DST): UTC+3 (EEST)

Dabovitsa is a village in Sungurlare Municipality, in Burgas Province, in southeastern Bulgaria.
