= Karnobat Municipality =

Coordinates: 42.6500°N 26.9830°E

Karnobat Municipality Община Карнобат
- Municipality (Obshtina)
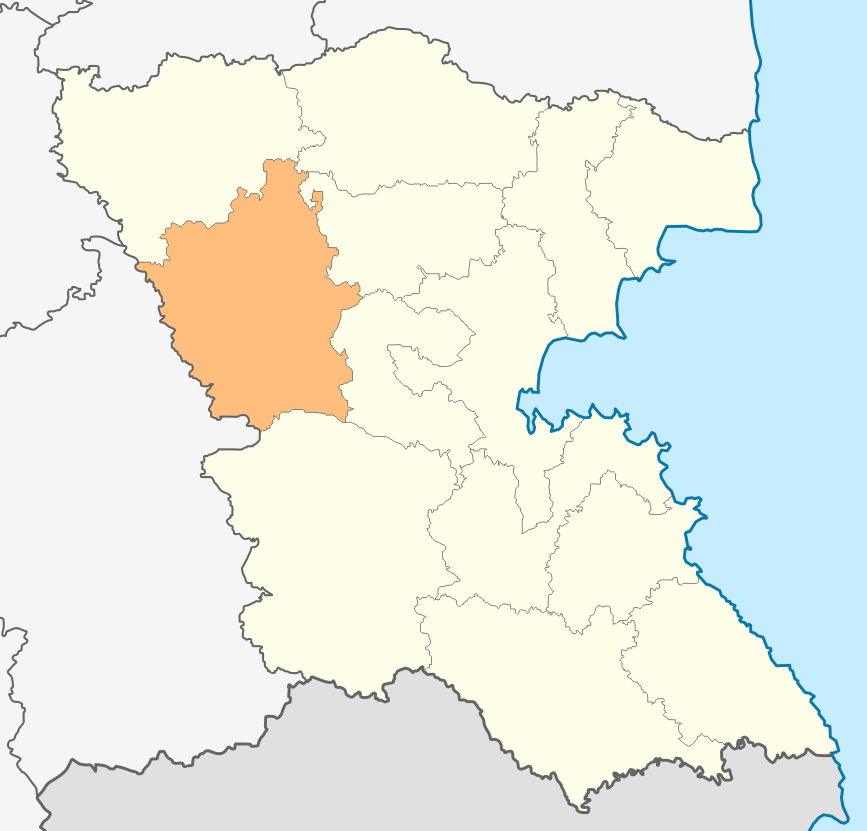
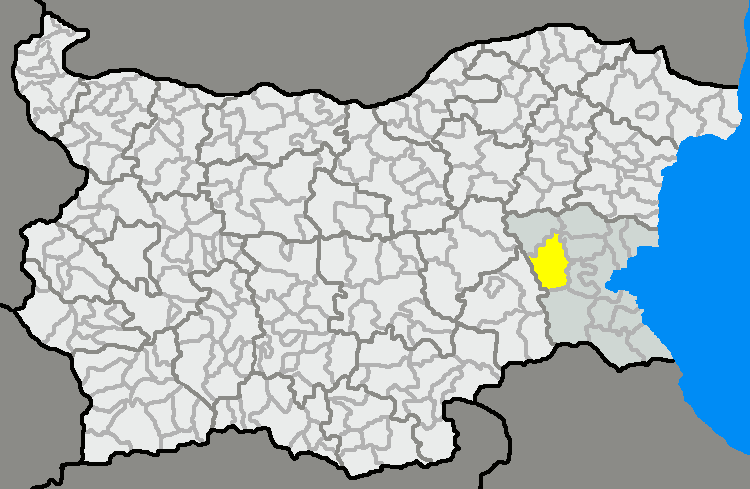
- Location in Burgas province Location on map of Bulgaria
- Country: Bulgaria
- Province (Oblast): Burgas
- Seat: Karnobat

Area
  - Total: 835.47 km^{2} (322.58 sq mi)

Population (2011)
  - Total: 25,477
  - Density: 30.494/km^{2} (78.980/sq mi)
- Time zone: UTC+2 (EET)
  - Summer (DST): UTC+3 (EEST)
- Website: karnobat.acstre.com

Karnobat Municipality (Bulgarian: Община Карнобат, Obshtina Karnobat) is a municipality in Burgas Province, Bulgaria. It includes the town of Karnobat and a number of villages and lies in the Karnobat Valley.

== Demographics ==
=== Religion ===
According to the latest Bulgarian census of 2011, the religious composition, among those who answered the optional question on religious identification, was the following:

Religious composition of Karnobat Municipality
Orthodox Christianity	74.7%
Catholicism	0.3%
Protestantism	1.8%
Islam	8.0%
No religion	5.3%
Prefer not to answer, others and aindefinable	9.9%
