= Burgas =

Burgas Бургас Bourgas (alternatively)
- City
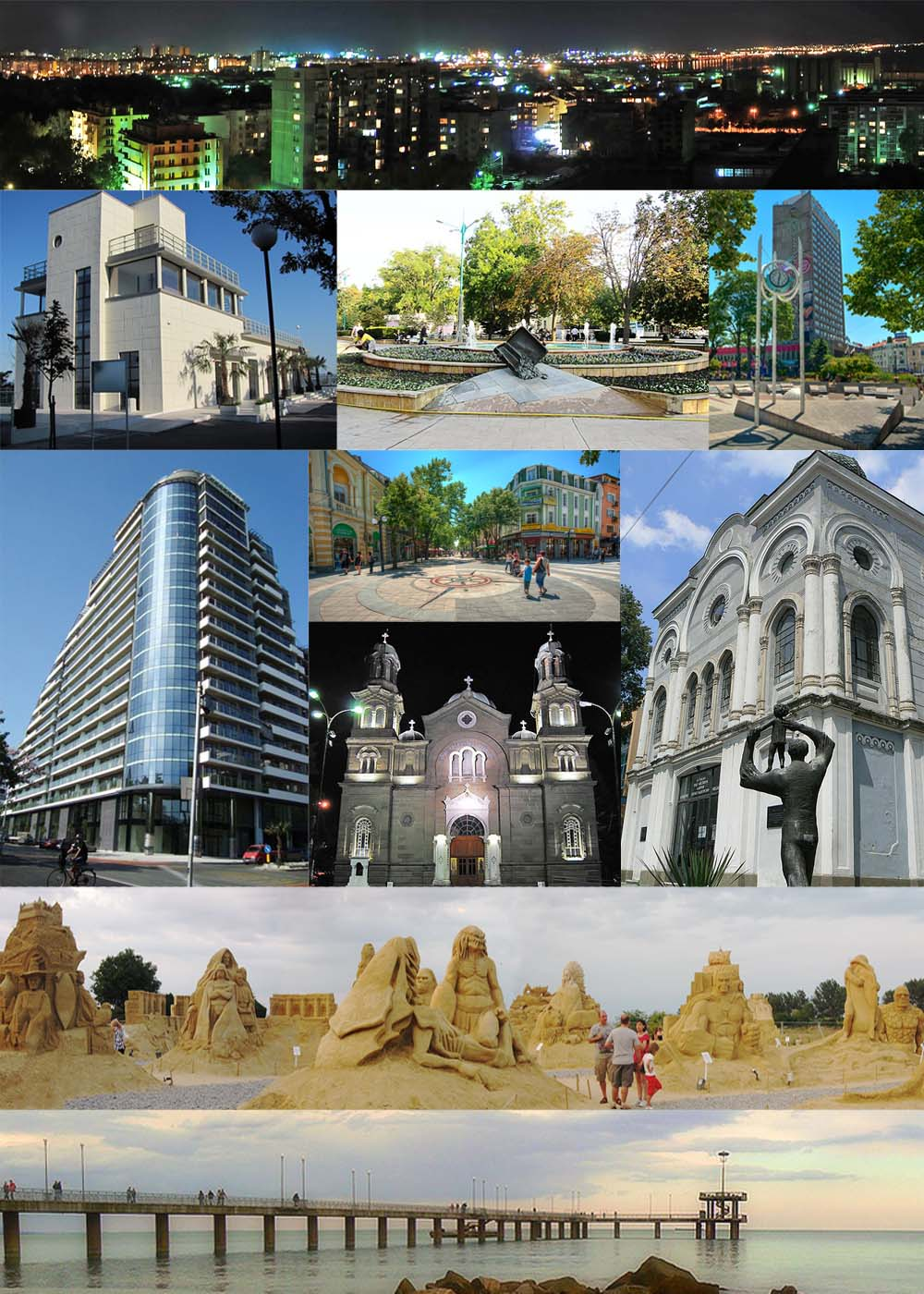
- Top to bottom, left to right: View of Slaveikov district at night, Marine Casino Center in Burgas Sea Garden, A fountain in Tsaritsa Ioanna Square, View of Clock in Transportana shopping area, Panteona Complex Building, Bogoridi Street, Church of Sts. Cyril and Methodius, Burgas, Burgas Art Gallery, View of Burgas Sand Sculptures event in Sea Garden, The Pier at the Burgas Central Beach.

- Flag Coat of arms
- Nicknames: "The city of sea and lakes" "The city of the dreams"
- Location of Burgas Burgas (Balkans) Burgas (Europe) Burgas (Black Sea)
- Coordinates: 42°30′10.674″N 27°28′12.644″E
- Country: Bulgaria
- Province (Oblast): Burgas
- Municipality: Burgas

Government
  - Mayor: Dimitar Nikolov (GERB)

Area
  - Total: 253.644 km^{2} (97.932 sq mi)
- Elevation: 30 m (98 ft)

Population (2026-03-15)
  - Total: 210 382 ▲ (within city limits)
  - Density: 0.83/km^{2} (2.1/sq mi)
  - Urban: 225,945 ▲
- Time zone: UTC+2 (EET)
  - Summer (DST): UTC+3 (EEST)
- Postal codes: 8000–8034
- Area code: (+359) 56
- Website: Official website

Burgas (Bulgarian: Бургас, pronounced [burˈɡas]), sometimes transliterated as Bourgas, is the second largest city on the Bulgarian Black Sea Coast in the region of Northern Thrace and the fourth-largest city in Bulgaria after Sofia, Plovdiv, and Varna, with a population of 210,382 inhabitants, and 225,945 in its urban area. It is the capital of Burgas Province and an important industrial, transport, cultural and tourist centre.

The city is surrounded by the Burgas Lakes and located at the westernmost point of the Black Sea, at the large Burgas Bay. LUKOIL Neftochim Burgas is the largest oil refinery in southeastern Europe and the largest industrial enterprise. The Port of Burgas is the second largest port in Bulgaria, and Burgas Airport is the second most important in the country. Burgas is the centre of the Bulgarian fishing and fish processing industry.

== Names ==
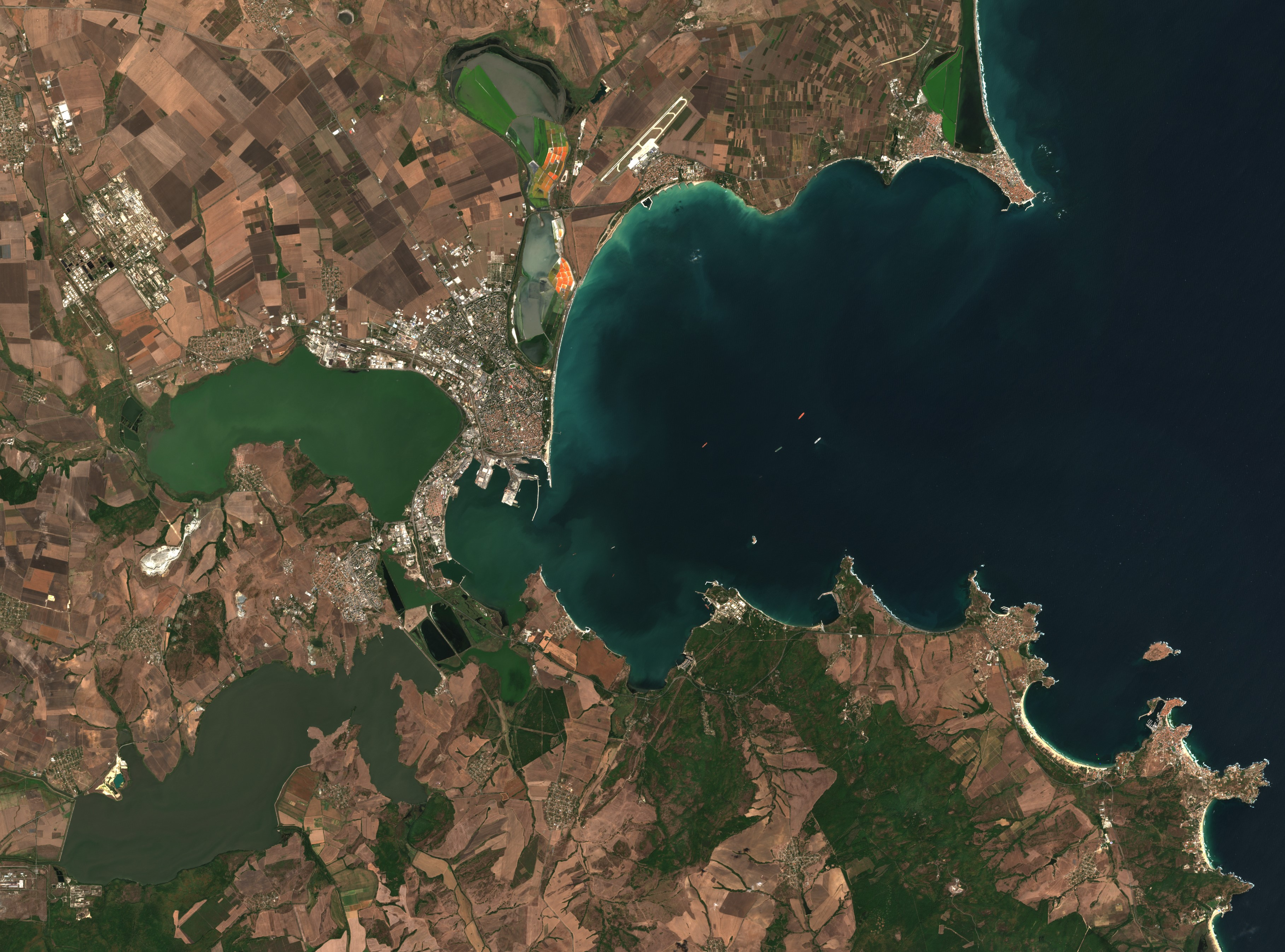
Burgas as seen from space

The city's name is considered to go back to the Greek word for "tower", "Pyrgos" (Greek: Πύργος). It is mentioned by the Byzantine poet Manuel Philes and rendered in Turkish as Burgaz. There are several alternative explanations for the name's origin. One of them states the city's name comes from Gothic name "baurgs", meaning "signified consolidated walled villages". According to Bulgarian prof. Kiril Vlahov, the name of the city comes from the Thracian word "pyurg", meaning "fortification of wooden beams".

== Geography ==
=== Topography ===
Burgas is situated at the westernmost point of the bay by the same name and in the eastern part of the Burgas Plain, in the east of the Upper Thracian Plain. Burgas is located some 360 kilometres (224 mi) from Sofia, 255 km (158 mi) from Plovdiv, 130 km (81 mi) from Varna, and 332 km (206 mi) from Istanbul. To the west, south and north, the city is surrounded by the Burgas Lakes: Burgas, Atanasovsko, and Mandrensko, which are home to several hundred bird species. Pan-European corridor 8 passes through the city, the European routes E87 and E773, and the longest national rout I/6. The St. Anastasia Island is a part of the city.

=== Climate ===
Under the Köppen climate classification, Burgas has a humid subtropical climate (Köppen: Cfa). The summertime in Burgas lasts about five months from mid-May until late September. Average temperatures during high season is 24 °C (75 °F). Summertime sea temperatures stay around 23–24 °C (73–75 °F) at sunrise and go up to 29–30 °C (84–86 °F) by dusk, averaging 26 °C (79 °F). Winters are milder compared with the inland part of the country, with average temperatures of 4–5 °C (39–41 °F) and below 0 °C (32 °F) during the night. Snow is possible in December, January, February and rarely in March; however, it can quickly melt. The highest temperature was recorded in June 2007, at 42.8 °C (109 °F) and the lowest at −21.6 °C (−7 °F) in January 1942.

Climate data for Burgas, Bulgaria (1991-2020, extremes 1953-present)
Month	Jan	Feb	Mar	Apr	May	Jun	Jul	Aug	Sep	Oct	Nov	Dec	Year
Record high °C (°F)	20.1 (68.2)	23.2 (73.8)	28.4 (83.1)	31.8 (89.2)	34.9 (94.8)	42.8 (109.0)	41.3 (106.3)	41.7 (107.1)	36.2 (97.2)	34.0 (93.2)	27.2 (81.0)	22.8 (73.0)	42.8 (109.0)
Mean daily maximum °C (°F)	6.6 (43.9)	8.8 (47.8)	12.2 (54.0)	16.2 (61.2)	21.7 (71.1)	26.5 (79.7)	28.8 (83.8)	28.8 (83.8)	24.7 (76.5)	19.2 (66.6)	13.5 (56.3)	8.1 (46.6)	17.9 (64.2)
Daily mean °C (°F)	3.0 (37.4)	4.4 (39.9)	7.3 (45.1)	11.2 (52.2)	16.6 (61.9)	21.4 (70.5)	23.7 (74.7)	23.9 (75.0)	19.7 (67.5)	14.6 (58.3)	9.5 (49.1)	4.6 (40.3)	13.3 (55.9)
Mean daily minimum °C (°F)	−0.1 (31.8)	0.9 (33.6)	3.7 (38.7)	7.8 (46.0)	13.0 (55.4)	17.3 (63.1)	19.5 (67.1)	19.6 (67.3)	15.6 (60.1)	11.1 (52.0)	6.3 (43.3)	1.7 (35.1)	9.7 (49.5)
Record low °C (°F)	−21.6 (−6.9)	−19.5 (−3.1)	−15.0 (5.0)	−1.9 (28.6)	2.2 (36.0)	6.0 (42.8)	10.2 (50.4)	10.9 (51.6)	4.0 (39.2)	−1.2 (29.8)	−9.6 (14.7)	−15.0 (5.0)	−21.6 (−6.9)
Average precipitation mm (inches)	48 (1.9)	42 (1.7)	43 (1.7)	42 (1.7)	47 (1.9)	50 (2.0)	45 (1.8)	24 (0.9)	50 (2.0)	65 (2.6)	51 (2.0)	49 (1.9)	556 (21.9)
Average precipitation days (≥ 1 mm)	6	5	7	6	7	6	5	3	5	6	5	7	68
Average relative humidity (%)	80.2	77.6	75.3	76.4	76	73.4	70.9	71.4	72.2	77.1	79.2	80.6	75.9
Mean monthly sunshine hours	76	110	147	207	278	302	339	323	264	185	118	63	2,412
Average ultraviolet index	1	2	4	5	7	8	9	8	5	4	2	1	4.7
Source 1: NOAA NCEI
Source 2: Climatebase.ru (extremes, humidity, sun 1953-2011), Meteomanz (extremes since 2021)

=== Flora and fauna ===
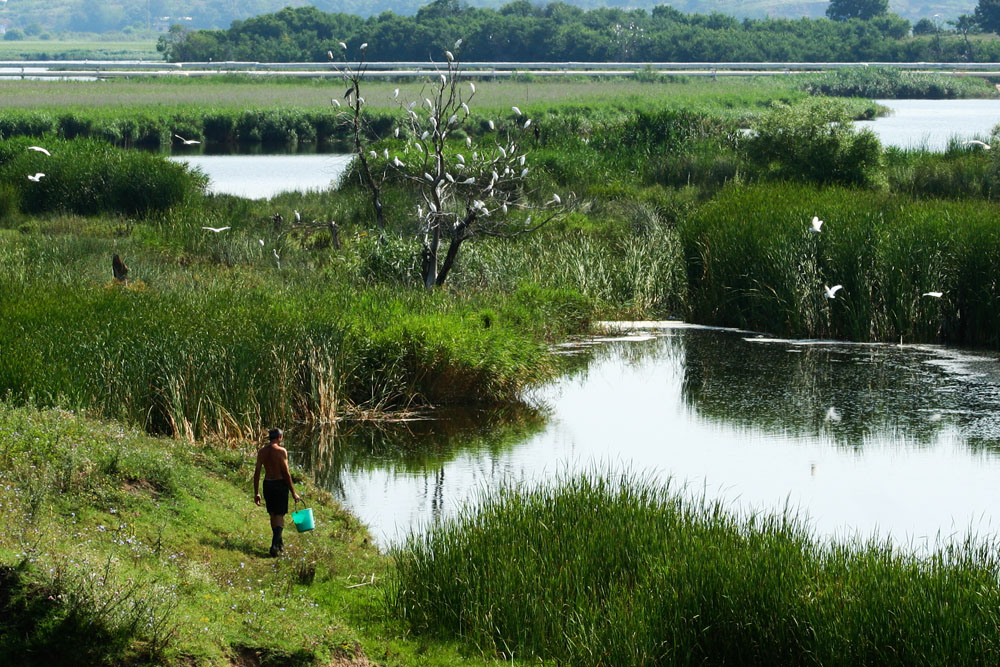
Usungeren Protected Area

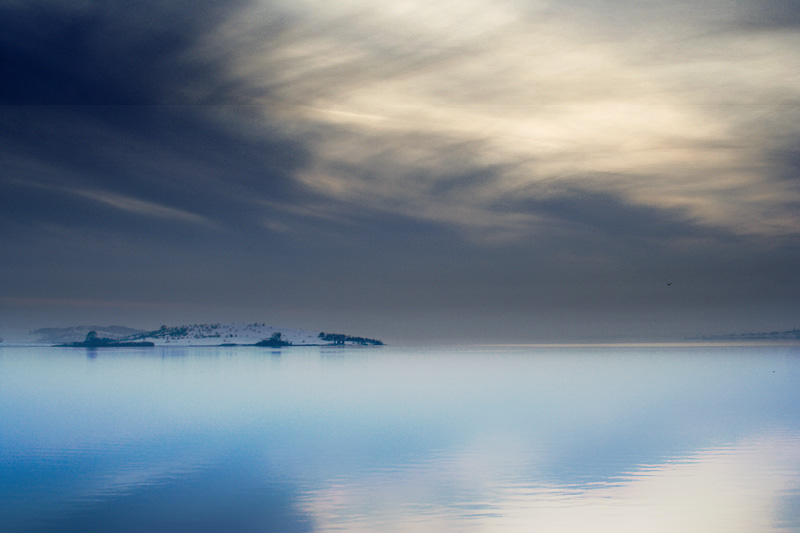
Lake Mandrensko

The Burgas Wetlands are highly recognized for their significance to biodiversity and as a resource pool for products used by people.

Lake Burgas is Bulgaria's largest lake and is in the middle of the city. It is important for migrating birds. Over 250 species of birds inhabit the lake area, 61 of which are endangered in Bulgaria and 9 globally, attracting keen birdwatchers from all over the world. The lakes are also home to important fish and invertebrates. In the site have been recorded several IUCN Red-Listed species of animals – 5 invertebrates, 4 fish, 4 amphibians, 3 reptiles, 5 birds and 3 mammals. Situated along the second largest migration path of birds in Europe, the Via Pontica, the site is an important stopover and staging site for a large number of water-birds, raptors and passerines. Yearly during migration and wintering more than 20,000 (up to 100,000) waterbirds congregate there.

The Atanasovo Lake is one of two salt-water lakes in the Black Sea region and contains rare and representative examples of wetland habitats. It is a hot spot for biodiversity, with many Red-Listed species of plants and animals. It is a well-known bottleneck site for migratory birds, with around 60,000 raptors and 240,000 storks, pelicans and cranes passing over the site and often landing in large numbers for staging. The highest numbers in Europe of migrating Great white pelican (Pelecanus onocrotalus), Dalmatian pelican (Pelecanus crispus), Western marsh harrier (Circus aeruginosus) and Red-footed Falcon (Falco vespertinus) have been recorded here.

=== Protected areas ===
- Burgas Lake Protected Area
- Atanasovo Lake Protected Area
- Mandra Lake Protected Area
- Poda Protected Area
- Usungeren Protected Area
- Chengene Skele Protected Area
- Strandzha Natural Park

=== Administrative division ===
Burgas is divided into the following neighbourhoods:

- Akatsiite
- Bratya Miladinovi
- Vazrazhdane
- Gorno Ezerovo
- Dolno Ezerovo
- Zornitsa
- Izgrev
- Lazur
- Lozovo
- Meden Rudnik
- Petko Slaveykov
- Pobeda
- Sarafovo
- Kraimorie
- Centar
- Vetren
- Banevo
- Rudnik
- Cherno more
- Horizont

With a decision from the Counsel of Ministers in 2009, the villages of Banevo and Vetren were incorporated into Burgas.

Currently a new city plan is being considered which will open the city to the sea and includes several residential neighbourhoods and a new highway junction.

== History ==
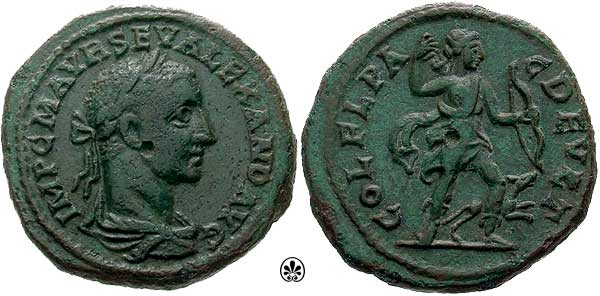
Alexander Severus coin from the Colonia Flavia Pacis Deultensium

The earliest signs of life in the region date back 3,000 years, to the Bronze Age and the early Iron Age. The favorable conditions on the fertile plain, around the sea, have brought people here from early antiquity. The biggest mark was left by the Thracians who made the region rich in archaeological finds (from around 4th c. BC). This includes their sanctuary at Beglik Tash along the south coast and a burial mound near Sunny Beach. They built the mineral baths of Aquae Calidae and the fortress Tyrsis. Under Darius I, it became part of the Achaemenid Empire, before the Odrysian kingdom was established. Greeks from Apollonia built a marketplace to trade with the Thracians, in what is now the neighborhood of Pobeda.

During the rule of the Ancient Romans, near Burgas, Colonia Flavia Pacis Deultensium (Deultum, Dibaltum, or Develtum) was established as a military colony for veterans by Vespasian in AD 70. The Romans built this colonia on the main road Via Pontica. It was the second most important city in the province Haemimontus.

In 376 the Goths destroyed an elite Roman company near Develtum at the Battle of Dibaltum.

=== Bulgarian and Byzantine Middle Ages ===
In the Middle Ages, there were important settlements in the area: the fortress Skafida, Poros, Rusokastron (Battle of Rusokastro), the Baths called Aquae Calidae and used by Byzantine, Bulgarian and Ottoman Emperors; a small fortress called Pyrgos was erected where Burgas is today and was most probably used as a watchtower. Under the Byzantine Empire it became an important city on the Black Sea coast. The Bulgarian ruler Krum built the Erkesiya, a 140 km (87 mi)-long border wall from the Black Sea (near Gorno Ezerovo) to the Maritsa River.

In 1206, the Latin Emperor Henry of Flanders (see Fourth Crusade) destroyed Aquae Calidae, which was known as Thermopolis at this time, The baths were later rebuilt by the Byzantines and Bulgarians. Poros was mentioned in a 1270 document of the Patriarchate of Constantinople. Close to Poros took place the Battle of Skafida in 1304, when the Bulgarian Tsar Todor Svetoslav defeated the Byzantines and conquered the southern Black Sea coast.

At the beginning of the 14th century, the region was sacked by the Catalan Company. In the 13th century Burgas is mentioned by the Byzantine poet Manuel Philes in his works as Burgas.

=== Ottoman rule ===
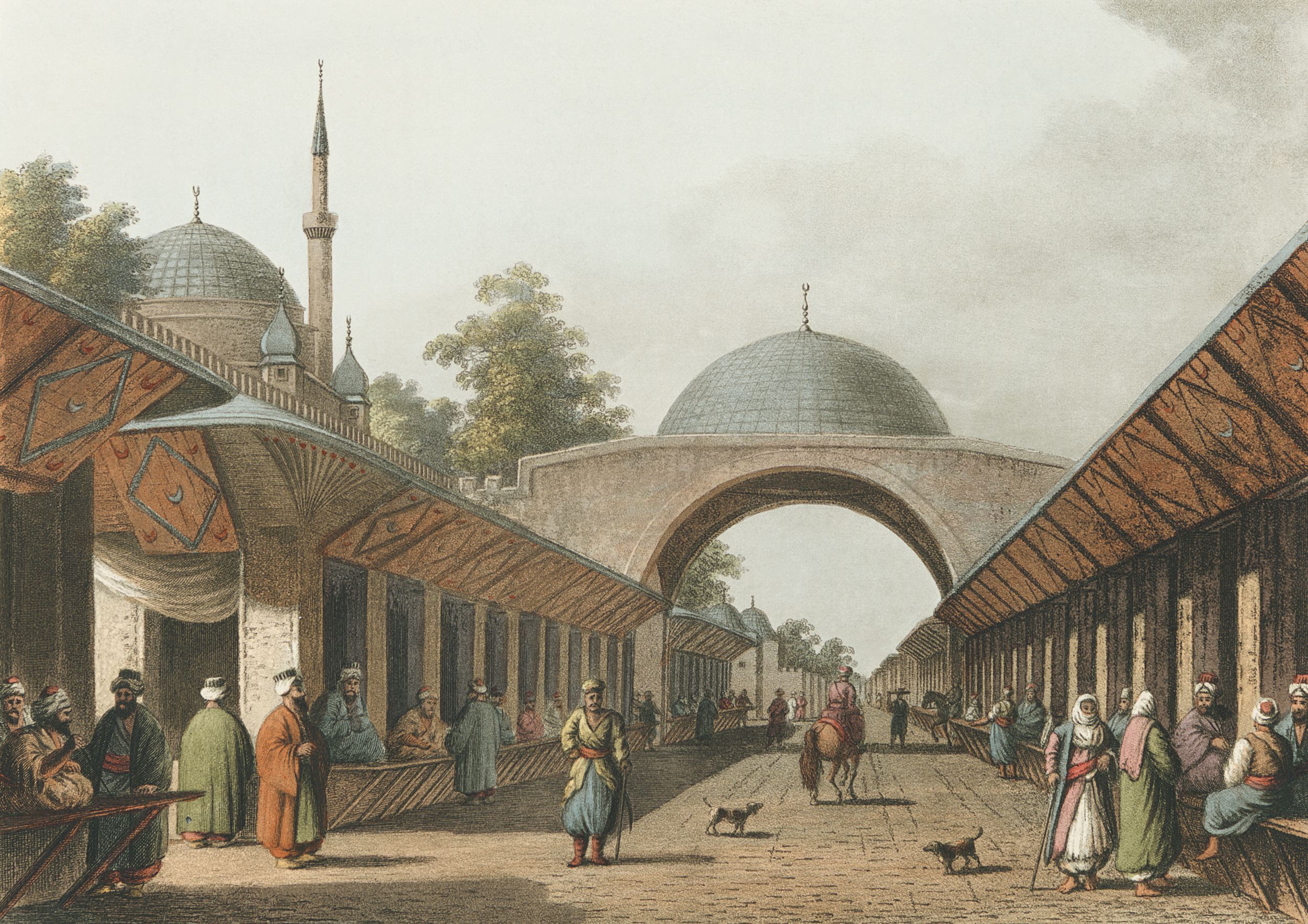
Burgas in Ottoman Bulgaria, painted by Luigi Mayer

Like many of the towns surrounding it, Burgas was conquered by the Ottomans with the rest of Bulgaria in the late 14th century, only to be returned to the Byzantine Empire during the Ottoman Interregnum and retained by the Byzantines until the fall of the Empire to the Ottomans in 1453. It was only in the 17th century that a settlement renamed to Ahelo-Pirgas grew in the modern area of the city. It was later renamed to Burgas again and had only about 3,000 inhabitants. In the early 19th century Burgas was depopulated after raids by kurzdhali bandits. By the mid-19th century it had recovered its economic prominence through the growth of craftsmanship and the export of grain. The city was a small town in İslimye (Sliven) sanjak in at first Rumelia Eyalet, after that in the Silistra Eyalet and Edirne Eyalet before the liberation in 1878.

In the 17th and 18th centuries Burgas became an important port for cereal and possesses its own grain measure, the Burgas-Kile. The town was the regional centre of trade and administrative centre of the Burgas Kaaza.

In 1865 the port of Burgas was after Trapezunt the second most important Ottoman port in the Black Sea. Burgas was at this time the major centre on the southern Bulgarian Black Sea Coast.

=== From liberation to 1945 ===
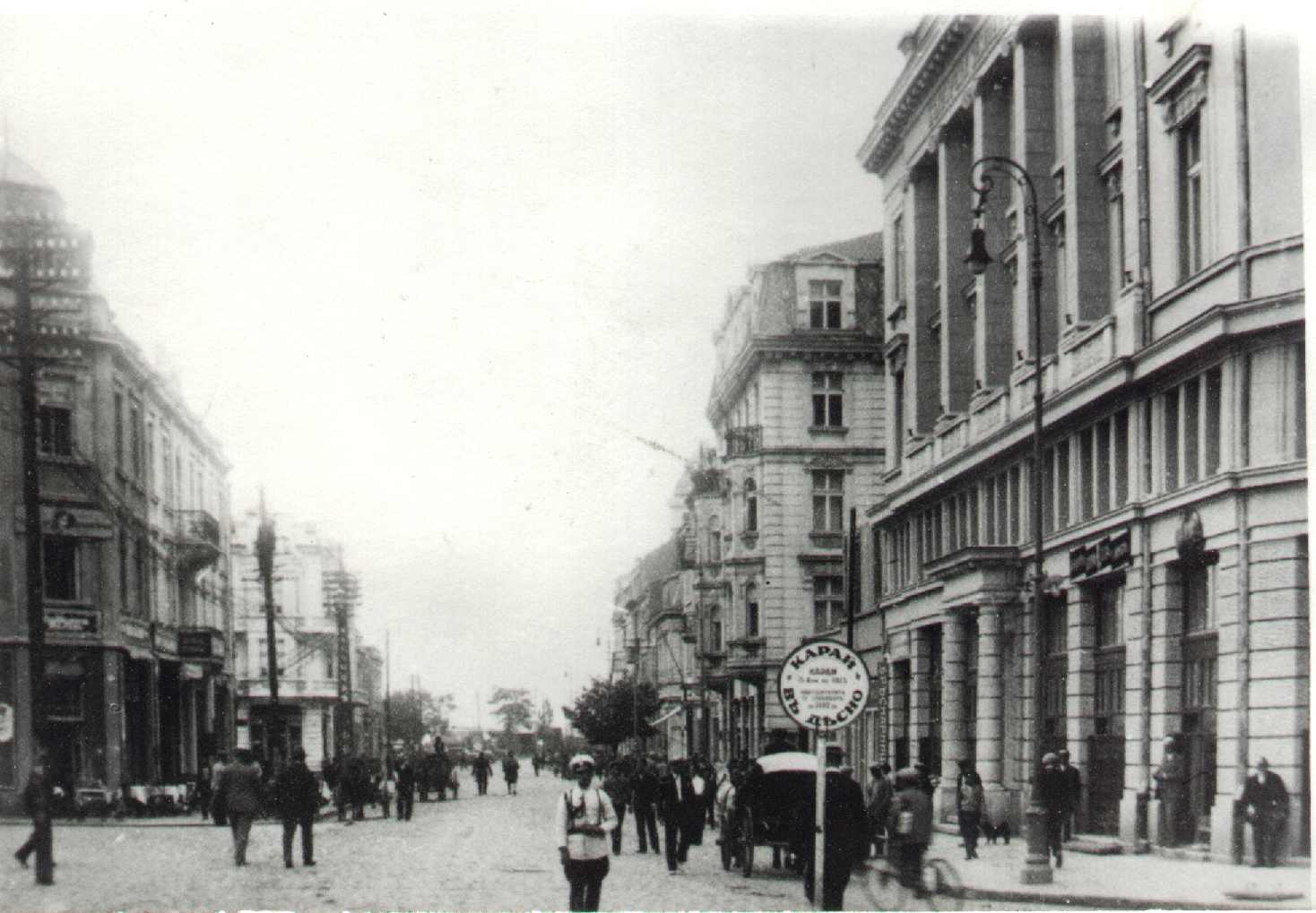
Alexandrovska Street in 1906

It was a department centre in Eastern Rumelia before incorporated in the Principality of Bulgaria in 1885. From the late 19th century Burgas became an important economic and industry center. The first development plan of the city was adopted in 1891 and the city's layout and appearance changed, especially through the newly constructed public buildings. In 1888, the city library was founded, in 1891 the sea garden was created and in 1897 the Cathedral of the Holy brothers Cyril and Methodius was built. In 1895 Georgi Ivanov opened the first Printing house in Burgas, followed by the house of Christo Velchev in 1897, which changed in 1900 his name in Velchevi Brothers Printing house.

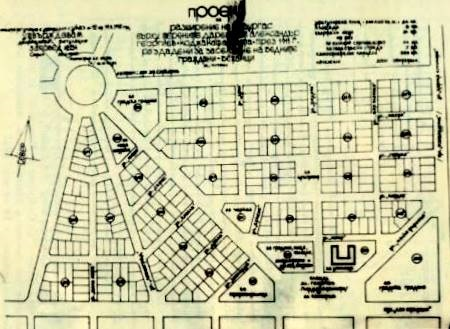
A 1913 plan of the city

The opening of the railway line to Plovdiv on 27 May 1890 and the deep water port in 1903 were important stages of this boom and led to the rapid industrialization of the city. In the period after 151 factories were founded. Among them were the Sugar refinery founded by Avram Chaliovski, the Great Bulgarian Mills of Ivan Chadzipetrov and the oil and soap factory Kambana. In 1900 the mineral springs by the ancient Aquae Calidae were included in the urban area. In 1903, the new building of the Burgas Central railway station opened.

Founded in 1924 in Burgas Deweko (now HemusMark AD) was the first pencil factory in Southeastern Europe and became in 1937 official supplier to the Bulgarian Monarchy. 1925 opened in Burgas a specialized high school for mechanics and technologies. The following year, a large covered market was opened. Because of the cold wave in winter 1928/29 the Black Sea iced in late January and early February, so that the island of Sveta Anastasia could be reached on foot. 1934, Burgas already had 34,260 inhabitants.

=== Communism ===
During World War II on 9 September 1944 Red Army troops occupied the city and soon the whole country. In the following People's Courts, especially members of the wealthy families of the intelligentsia and members of the Bar Association were convicted. The two Chambers of the People's Courts met in Burgas in the former building of the Chamber of Commerce and Industry of Burgas (now the seat of the Governor of the Province Burgas).

After the Communists took power in 1945, the German and Italian School and the People's University were closed and over 160 factories and businesses (including the large companies Great Bulgarian Mills, Veriga, Plug, Dab, etc.), shops, baths and other private property were nationalized. The nationalization and inability to lead by the new rulers led the companies to the collapse of the food supply and the shortage of goods of daily life in the city. The political repression against the population of Burgas continued for the next few years. Access to universities and other higher education in the Bulgarian capital was refused for the young people of Burgas and some of them were interned in prison and labor camps.

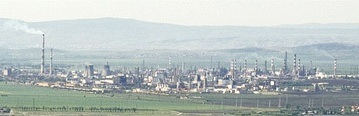
The Neftohim refinery, one of the major Bulgarian industrial capacities, built during the Socialist era

After the end of the Second World War, the Haganah organised several convoys for the European survivors of the Holocaust, which departed on ships from Burgas for Palestine. These convoys allowed 12,000 people, including the Jewish population of the city, to emigrate. In the following years the city center of Burgas, unlike many other Bulgarian cities, was not much affected by Communist-type urbanization and has kept much of its 19th- and early-20th-century architecture. A number of oil and chemical companies were gradually built.

The terrorists of the 2 June Movement, Till Meyer, Gabriele Rollnik, Gudrun Stürmer and Angelika Goder were arrested on 21 June 1978 in Burgas by West German officials and then brought into the Federal Republic.

=== Post 1990 ===
Today the local port is the largest in Bulgaria adding significantly to the regional economy. Burgas also hosts annual national exhibitions and international festivals and has a vibrant student population of over 6,000 that add to the city's appeal. The historical society also maintains open-air museums at Beglik Tash and Develtum.

Several countries have General Consulates in Burgas, among them Belarus, Czech Republic, Estonia, Georgia, Greece, Romania, Russia, Sierra Leone, Turkey and Ukraine.

In 2023 Bulgaria took back the concession it had granted to Lukoil in 2011 to run the Rosenets oil terminal.

==== 2012 bus bombing ====
On 18 July 2012 a terrorist attack was carried out by a suicide bomber on a passenger bus transporting Israeli tourists at the Burgas Airport. The bus was carrying forty-two Israelis, mainly youths, from the airport to their hotels, after arriving on a flight from Tel Aviv. The explosion killed the Bulgarian bus driver and five Israelis.

== Population ==
During the first decade after the liberation of Bulgaria, in the 1880s the population of Burgas numbered about 6,000 inhabitants. Since then it started growing decade by decade, mostly because of the migrants from the rural areas and the surrounding smaller towns, reaching its peak in the period 1988–1991 exceeding 200,000.

Historical population
Year	Pop.	±%
1887	5,749	—
1900	11,738	+104.2%
1910	14,897	+26.9%
1920	21,170	+42.1%
1934	36,230	+71.1%
1946	44,449	+22.7%
1956	72,526	+63.2%
1965	106,115	+46.3%
1975	144,482	+36.2%
1985	182,549	+26.3%
1992	195,686	+7.2%
2001	192,390	−1.7%
2011	200,271	+4.1%
2021	189,741	−5.3%

== Ethnic linguistic and religious composition ==

According to the latest 2011 census data, the individuals declared their ethnic identity were distributed as follows:

- Bulgarians: 172,898 (95.2%)
- Turks: 3,200 (1.2%)
- Roma: 3,122 (0.9%)
- Others: 1,330 (0.7%)
- Indefinable: 666 (0.4%)
- Undeclared: 19,155 (1.6%)

Total: 211,033

== Twin towns and sister cities ==
Burgas is twinned with:

- Alexandroupoli, Greece
- (Georgia (country)) Batumi, Georgia
- Gomel, Belarus
- Krasnodar, Russia
- Miskolc, Hungary
- Rijeka, Croatia
- Aksaray, Turkey
- Rotterdam, Netherlands
- Sarıyer (Istanbul), Turkey
- South-Western AO (Moscow), Russia
- Vologda, Russia
- Yalova, Turkey
- Yantai, China

== Economy ==
Burgas is an important industrial centre. The most notable industrial enterprise was LUKOIL Neftochim Burgas - the largest oil refinery now owned and run by Bulgaria, and the largest manufacturing plant in the Balkans. The city, along with Sofia, is one of the key elements in supporting Bulgaria's future European transport network (TEN-T) EU and Pan-European Transport Corridor 4, which includes construction of the railway and road infrastructure and the development of the Port of Burgas and Burgas Airport.

== Education ==
=== University of Bourgas "Prof. doc. Asen Zlatarov" ===
The university of Bourgas "Prof doc. Asen Zlatarov" is the first university and still the only public higher education facility in the Bourgas region. It was founded on 6 October 1963 by Decree No 162 of the Council of Ministers as Higher Chemico-technological institute "Prof. d-r Asen Zlatarov" The university itself is named after Professor Doctor Asen Zlatarov - a Bulgarian scientist, the founder of the Bulgarian biochemistry school, and a major public figure in Bulgarian history.

In the past, the university included only specialties related to Chemistry, but now the university is the major educational institution in the Bourgas region, that incorporates the several faculties and colleges:

- Faculty of technical sciences
- Faculty of social sciences
- Faculty of natural sciences
- Technical college
- College of tourism
- Medical college

=== Burgas Free University ===
Burgas Free University (BFU) was established with an Act of The Great National Assembly on 18 September 1991 and is one of the first non-state universities in the country. The university is accredited by the National Evaluation and Accreditation Agency and is certified under the international quality standard ISO 9001:2008. BFU is a modern and innovative university, caring for its students and their professional realization, and which has significant academic achievements and an internationally recognized status. BFU is a member of the European Universities Association (EUA). It has signed Agreements of Cooperation with 36 universities and organizations in Europe, America, Asia and Africa. It implements students and staff exchange programmes with 24 universities in Europe. It participates in the European Credit Transfer and Accumulation System (ECTS).

BFU works under joint international projects with more than 100 universities and organizations and is a partner of UNESCO under the UNITWIN/UNESCO Chairs Programme and is a host institution of UNESCO Chair on Culture of Peace and Human Rights. Burgas Free University is certified according to the quality standards of the International Organization for Standardization (ISO). In 2005 BFU was certified under ISO 9001:2000 and in 2010 under ISO 9001:2008. All the university's main activities have been certified, as well as its degree programmes: education of students in Bachelor, Master and PhD programmes, qualification, research and international relations activities.

=== School of Commerce ===
The School of Commerce is a vocational college specialized in the fields of economics, finance, management and accounting education. Established on 1 October 1905, it is the second oldest business school in Bulgaria.

== Culture ==
Burgas will host the Eurovision Song Contest 2027, the first edition to be held in Bulgaria, after beating Sofia in an open bidding process.

=== Main sights ===
- Regional Historical Museum Burgas
- Ethnographic Museum
- Archaeological Museum - Burgas
- Museum of Nature and Science
- Historical museum Burgas
- Roman City of Develtum
- The Roman and medieval Baths of Aquae Calidae
- The Poros Fortress
- The Rusokastro Fortress
- The Erkesiya-Border wall
- City Gallery
- Theatre Adriana Budevska
- City Beach
- Pantheon
- The pier
- Sea Casino
- Navel of Burgas
- The building of Regional Customs Burgas
- Burgas Central railway station

Opera House

The modern building of the Burgas Opera House is home to the city's two major musical institutions; the Burgas State Opera and the Philharmonic Society of Burgas.

Sea Garden

A municipal park built in 1910 for the residents of Burgas by the city's chief gardener, Georgi Duhtev.

=== Churches and monasteries ===
Bulgarian Orthodox Churches

- Church of Sts. Cyril and Methodius
- Holy Theotokos Orthodox Church
- Saint John of Rila (Ivan Rilski) Orthodox Church
- Holy Trinity Orthodox Church
- Saint Demetrius Orthodox Church
- Saint Athanasius Orthodox Church
- Saint Nicholas Orthodox Church
- Saint Poimen of Zographou Orthodox Church
- Holy Theotokos Monastery
- Saint Anastasia Monastery on the St. Anastasia Island

Armenian Orthodox Church

Armenian Orthodox Church Surp Hach (Church of the Holy Cross) was built in 1853 and is one of the oldest in the city and has been named as one of the city's monuments of culture. With stained glass windows and intricate decoration inside, the picturesque church was built in 1855.

Bulgarian Catholic Churches

- Dormition of the Theotokos Bulgarian Byzantine Catholic Church
- Holy Mother of God Roman Catholic Church

=== Regular events ===
- April
  - International Audition for performances of German and Austrian music
- May
  - Bourgas Sailing Week
  - Petya Dubarova-Contest
  - Erata na Vodoleya-Theatre Festival
- July
  - July Morning
  - Three Week Festival of Opera and Classical Music
  - Bourgas Marathon swimming
  - Golden Mic Awards
  - Burgas and the Sea, an annual pop music festival
- August
  - Kiteboarding Regatta
  - Spirit of Burgas
  - International Folk Festival
- December
  - Every 6 December, Bourgas pays respect to its patron saint, St. Nicholas, also the patron saint of fishermen.
  - WDSF Burgas Cup

=== Professional sports ===
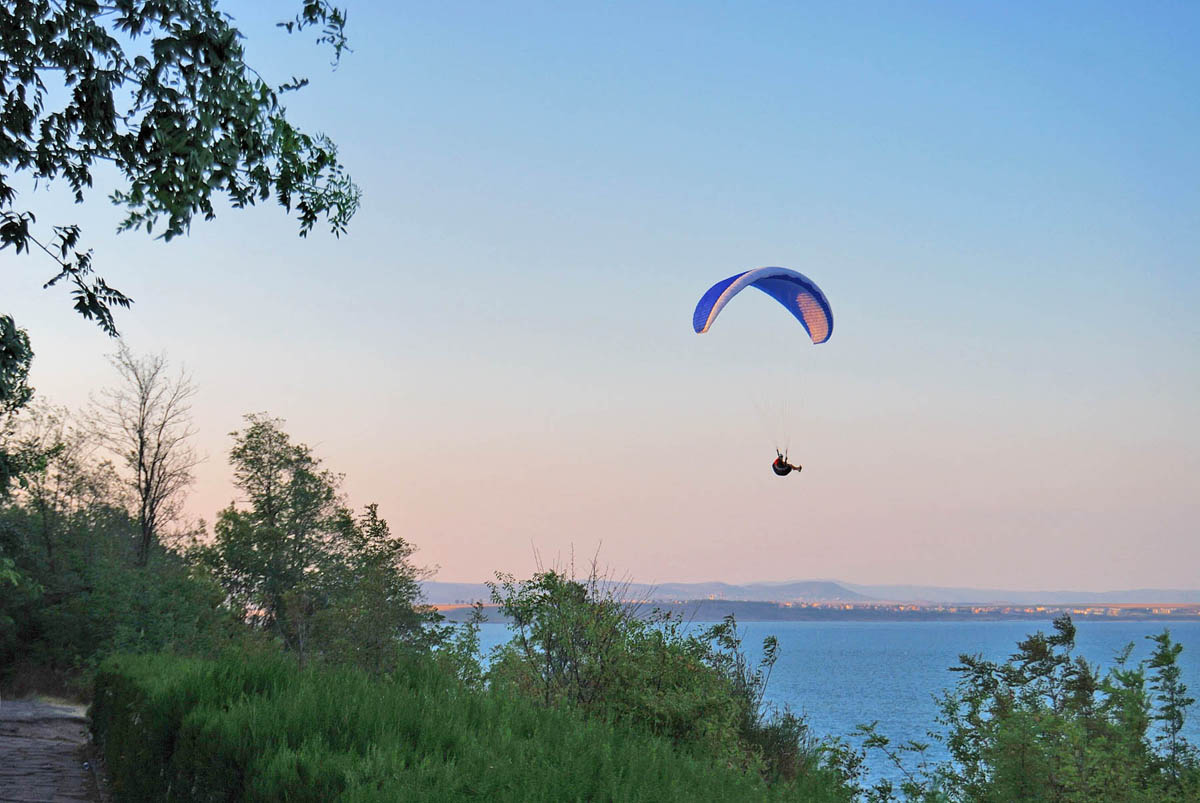
Paragliding over the Sea Garden in the City Centre, a common sight during the summer season

- PFC Naftex Burgas
- PFC Neftochimic Burgas
- FC Chernomorets 1919 Burgas
- PSFC Chernomorets Burgas
- FC Master Burgas
- FC Olimpic Burgas
- FC Sveti Nikola Burgas
- FC Sparta Burgas
- BC LUKoil Neftochimic
- BC Chernomorets
- Cycling Club Burgas
- Neftochimic 2010 - Volleyball Club
- Yacht Club Burgas
- Windsurf Club Burgas
- Rowing Club LUKoil Burgas
- Rowing Club Chernomorets Burgas
- Water polo Club Chernomorets
- Water polo Club Neptune

== Notable people ==
- Boris Aprilov (1921–1995), writer
- Maria Bakalova (b. 1996), actress
- Rousy Chanev (b. 1945), actor
- Georgi Chilikov (b. 1978), footballer
- Dimitar Dimitrov (b. 1959), football coach
- Georgi Djulgerov (b. 1943), film director
- Petya Dubarova (1962–1979), poet
- Hristo Fotev (1934–2002), poet
- Prodan Gardzhev (1936–2003), Bulgarian Olympic champion - wrestling
- Iliyan Ivanov (b. 1963), psychiatrist, artist, musician and movie producer.
- Valentin D. Ivanov (b. 1967), astronomer
- Raina Kabaivanska (b. 1934), Bulgarian Opera singer
- Georgi Kaloyanchev (1925–2012), actor
- Apostol Karamitev (1923–1973), actor
- Ivan Karayotov, archaeologist and historian (born 1941)
- Radostin Kishishev (b. 1974), footballer
- Georgi Kostadinov (b. 1950), first Bulgarian boxing Olympic champion
- Georgi Mihalev (b. 1968), competitive swimmer
- Nikola Mollov (1926–2014), chemist
- Avraham Ofek (1935–1990), sculptor
- Irena Petkova, opera singer
- Ivan Radulov, chess Grandmaster
- Hripsime Srapyan (1928–2013), actress and linguist of Italian
- Nikola Stanchev (1930-2009), first Bulgarian Olympic champion
- Kostas Varnalis (1884–1974), Greek poet
- Zlatko Yankov, (b. 1966), footballer
- Nedyalko Yordanov (b. 1940), writer
- Stefani Kiryakova (b. 2001) rhythmic gymnast

== Honours ==
Burgas Peninsula on Livingston Island in the South Shetland Islands, Antarctica is named after the city of Burgas. The ships of the company Ocean Fisheries – Burgas operated in the waters of South Georgia, Kerguelen, the South Orkney Islands, South Shetland Islands and Antarctic Peninsula from 1970 to the early 1990s. Bulgarian fishermen, along with those of the Soviet Union, Poland, and East Germany, were pioneers of the modern Antarctic fishing industry.”

== See also ==
- Bulgarian Black Sea Coast
- Thracian Bulgarians
