= Rudnik, Burgas Province =

Rudnik Рудник
- Village
- Location in Bulgaria
- Coordinates: 42°37′01″N 27°28′59″E
- Country: Bulgaria
- Province: Burgas Province
- Municipality: Burgas Municipality

Population (2022)
  - Total: 332
- Time zone: UTC+2 (EET)
  - Summer (DST): UTC+3 (EEST)

Rudnik (Bulgarian: Рудник) was a village in Burgas Municipality, in Burgas Province, in southeastern Bulgaria. It's a quarter of Burgas since 2015.

According to the 2022 census the village has 332 people.
