= Pobeda, Burgas =

District of Burgas, Bulgaria

Pobeda Победа
- District
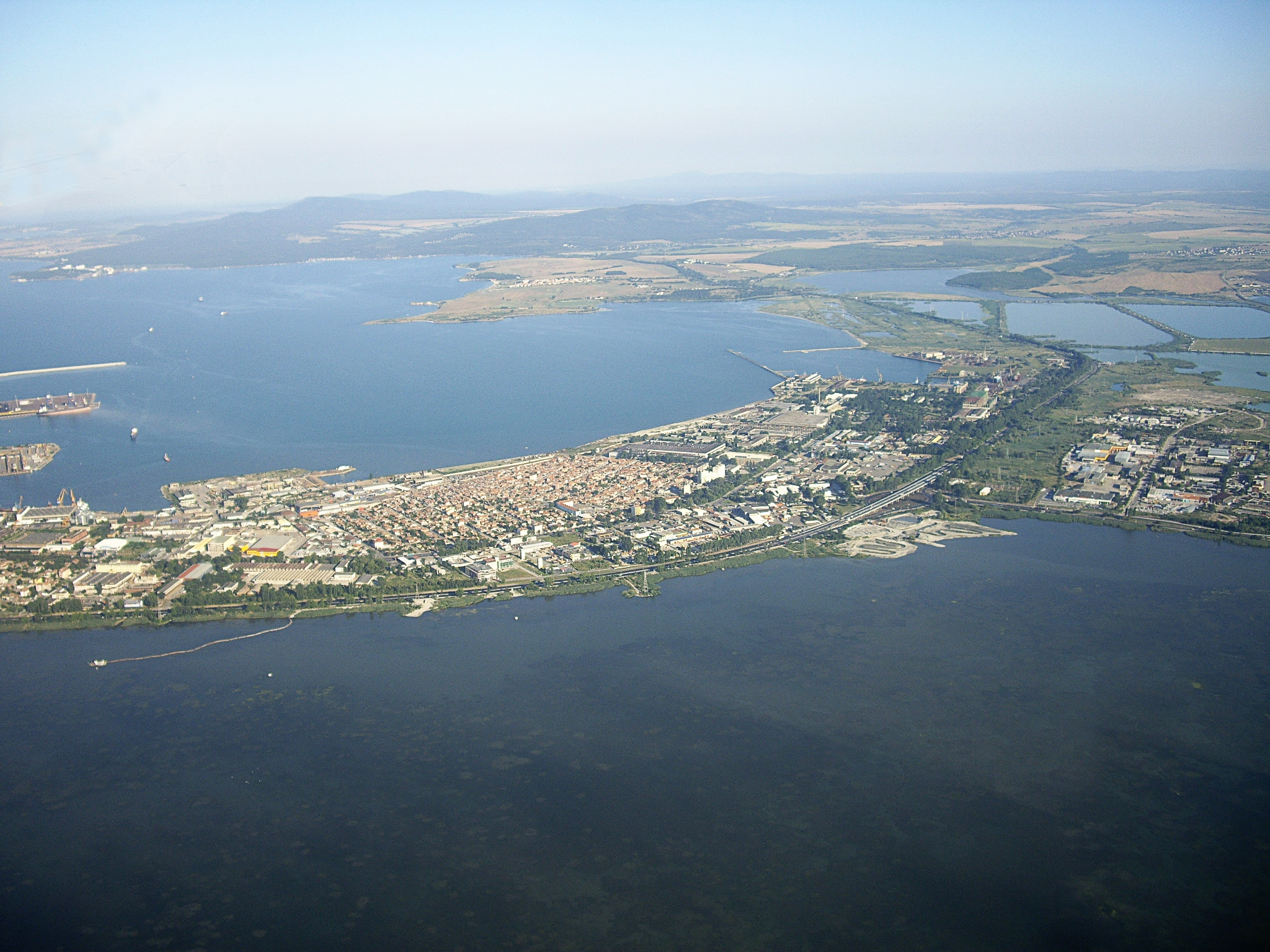
- Pobeda in 2012

- Location within Bulgaria
- Coordinates: 42.477778°N 27.4425°E
- Country: Bulgaria
- Province: Burgas Province
- Municipality: Burgas
- City: Burgas

Pobeda, also known as Kumluka (Bulgarian: Победа, lit. 'victory', Кумлука), is a district of Burgas, Bulgaria. Inhabited by predominantly Muslim Turkish Roma, it is one of the largest Romani communities in Bulgaria. Pobeda's population suffers from several issues, including high rates of dropping out of education and dismantlement of housing.

== Overview ==
What is now Pobeda traditionally served as the source for drinking water in Burgas up to the 1890s. The area's wells, known as 'sweet wells', supplied Burgas with water due to the freshwater Lake Burgas being a source of malaria. Back in the history its population was predominantly Bulgarian, but lately Romani. The district's plumbing and sewer system was opened in 2010, with the opening being attended by prime minister Boyko Borisov.

The majority of Pobeda's population is Romani, and, as with most other Romani neighbourhoods in Bulgaria, suffers from high rates of dropping out from education. Pobeda is one of the largest Roma neighbourhoods in Bulgaria. As with most other Roma districts in Burgas, Pobeda is inhabited by Turkish Roma who are predominantly Muslim.

During the COVID-19 pandemic in Bulgaria, Pobeda's population was subjected to surveillance by drones with thermal cameras to monitor body temperatures. As with other neighbourhoods in Burgas during the pandemic, movement through Pobeda was restricted to checkpoints.

Alongside other Muslim Roma-majority districts in Bulgaria, Pobeda has seen privatisation of land and demolitions of houses by the Burgas municipal government as illegal constructions, leading to allegations of deliberate displacements of Romani people by academic Piro Rexhepi.
