= Mirolyubovo =

Mirolyubovo may refer to:

- Mirolyubovo, Bulgaria, a village near Burgas
- Mirolyubovo, Kursk Oblast, a village near Fatezh, Russia
