= Nelly Rangelova =

Bulgarian pop singer

- Нели Рангелова
- Born: September 15, 1958 (age 68); Montana, Bulgaria
- Other name: Neli Rangelova
- Education: Bulgarian State Conservatory
- Occupation: Singer

Nelly Markova Rangelova (Bulgarian: Нели Маркова Рангелова; born 1958) is a Bulgarian pop singer from the town of Montana.

== Biography ==
Nelly Rangelova was born in Mihaylovgrad (now Montana) on September 15, 1958. She began her creative career in 1978 with the Burgas Orchestra as a backing vocalist. In 1983 she graduated from the Variety Department of the Bulgarian State Conservatory in the class of Tsvetana Vazvazova.

During her creative career she has recorded over 500 songs and won many awards, including the Grand Prize of the Golden Orpheus Festival in the International Competition for Performers in 1982. The same year she won the Grand Prize of the Neewollah Festival in Independence, Kansas, USA.

From 25 to 28 May 1983 she participated in the 18th edition of the international festival of popular song Bratislavská lýra in Czechoslovakia and won the Silver Lyre Award for the performance of the song "Until" (lyrics: Mihail Belchev, music and arrangement: Alexander Brazitsov) in the competition for foreign performers. For her performance of the same song she won the Second Prize of the 21st edition of the International Song Festival in Sopot (Poland), held from 15 to 17 August next year, and also performed a Bulgarian cover of the Polish song "Żyj kolorowo" [Live in color] from the repertoire of Ewa Bem. That same year, her first studio album was released, titled after the singer, which included, in addition to "How Long", her most famous song, "Inexplicable Things", widely known as "My Verse".

In 1987, Nelly Rangelova was among the top ten performers in the Blues category at a competition in Nashville with the song "You and the Last Rain". She is also a laureate of festivals in Siófok, Hungary, and Villach, Austria.

Nelly Rangelova has performed as a soloist in bands such as the Big Band of the Bulgarian National Radio, Silver Stars, and Akaga. She also sings as a guest musician with FSB, Rositsa Kirilova, Biser Kirov, and Orlin Goranov. She has also made 5 television films.

Music for her was written by Zornitsa Popova, Alexander Brazitzov, Angel Zaberski, Maria Ganeva, Maurice Aladjem, Toncho Rusev, Boris Chakarov, Dimitar Getov, and others.

In 2021 she participated in the festival "Burgas and the Sea" with the song "The Siren That ...", with music and arrangement by Svetoslav Loboshki and lyrics by Ivan Tenev. In the same year with Vesko Eschkenazy she recorded the song "Tango of Life" to the music of Ivan Krastev, lyrics by Gina Dundova-Pancheva, and arrangement and mastering by Krassimir Iliev. She is also very famous for her song Boom - Boom.

== Discography ==
=== Studio albums ===
- 1983 - Nelly Rangelova (LP, Balkanton - WTA 1461)
- 1986 - Good day I'll tell you (LP, Balkanton - WTA 12248)
- 1994 - Only You (CD and MS, Riva Sound - RSCD 3023)
- 1998 - Self-Portrait (CD and MS, Riva Sound - RSCD 3043)
- 2000 - Taste of Honey (CD, Riva Sound - RSCD 3075)
- 2002 - Surprise (Hot Country Duets Vol.1...) (CD, CMP Studio)
- 2004 - Split (CD, Danaya International)
- 2008 - Diamonds (2 CDs, Danaya International)

=== Concert Albums ===
- 2013 - Acoustic (CD, Nelly Rangelova)

=== Compilations ===
- 1993 - The Best of Nelly (MC, Mega Sofia)

=== Singles ===
- 1990 - "Cry for Proximity" - duet small record with Rositsa Kirilova (SP, Balkanton - VTK 3971)
