= Cherno =

Cherno (Russian "black") may refer to:

- Cherno more (disambiguation), black sea
- Cherno (album), by Finnish metal band KYPCK, 2008
- Cherno Samba, footballer
- Cherno Jallow, former Attorney General of the British Virgin Islands
- Cherno Jah, record producer, see Neneh Cherry
- Cherno Alpha, a Jaeger from the 2013 Sci-Fi mecha monster film Pacific Rim

== See also ==
- Chernozem
