= Burgas and the Sea =

Annual Bulgarian music festival

Burgas and the Sea Бургас и морето
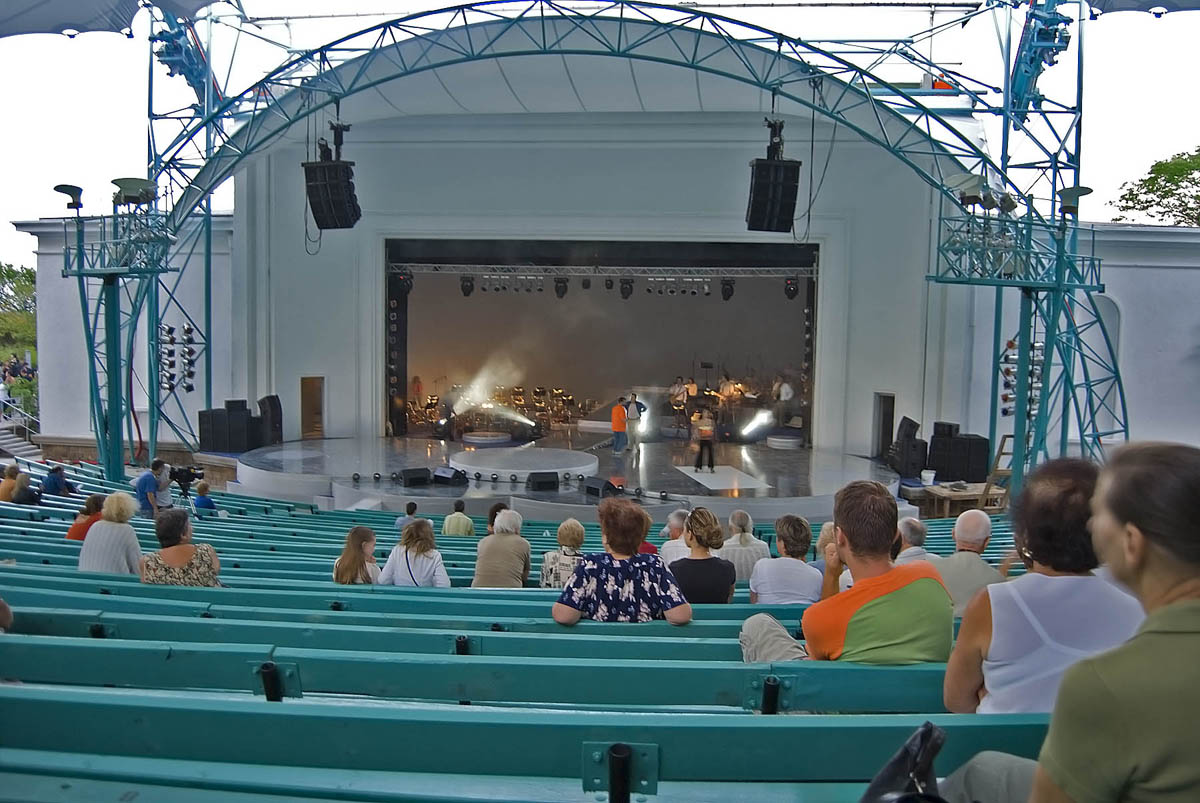
- Burgas Summer Theater, 2008
- Status: Active
- Genre: Music festival
- Date: Late July/early August
- Frequency: Annual
- Venue: Summer Theater
- Location: Burgas
- Country: Bulgaria
- Years active: 1973–1982; 1985; 1987; 1990; 1996–present
- Inaugurated: 1973
- Patron: Dimitar Nikolov
- Organiser: Burgas Municipality
- Website: burgasimoreto.org

Burgas and the Sea (Bulgarian: Бургас и морето) is an annual Bulgarian pop music festival and competition founded in 1973 and held at the Summer Theater in the city of Burgas. It is organized by the municipality, and the event's patron is the mayor of Burgas.

== History ==
Originally named Songs about the Sea, Burgas, and its Working People, the festival was established in 1973 and organized by the Municipal Council for Culture in Burgas, Bulgarian National Radio, Bulgarian National Television, and the state-owned record company Balkanton. In the 1980s, partly due to competition from the Golden Orpheus song contest, held in Sunny Beach, the frequency of the event was reduced to biennial, and after the 1990 edition, it was cancelled entirely. It was revived in 1996, with the cooperation of composer and music pedagogue Stefan Diomov, under its current name.
