= Beglik Tash =

Thracian sanctuary in Bulgaria

- Беглик Таш (Bulgarian); Beylik Taşı (Turkish)
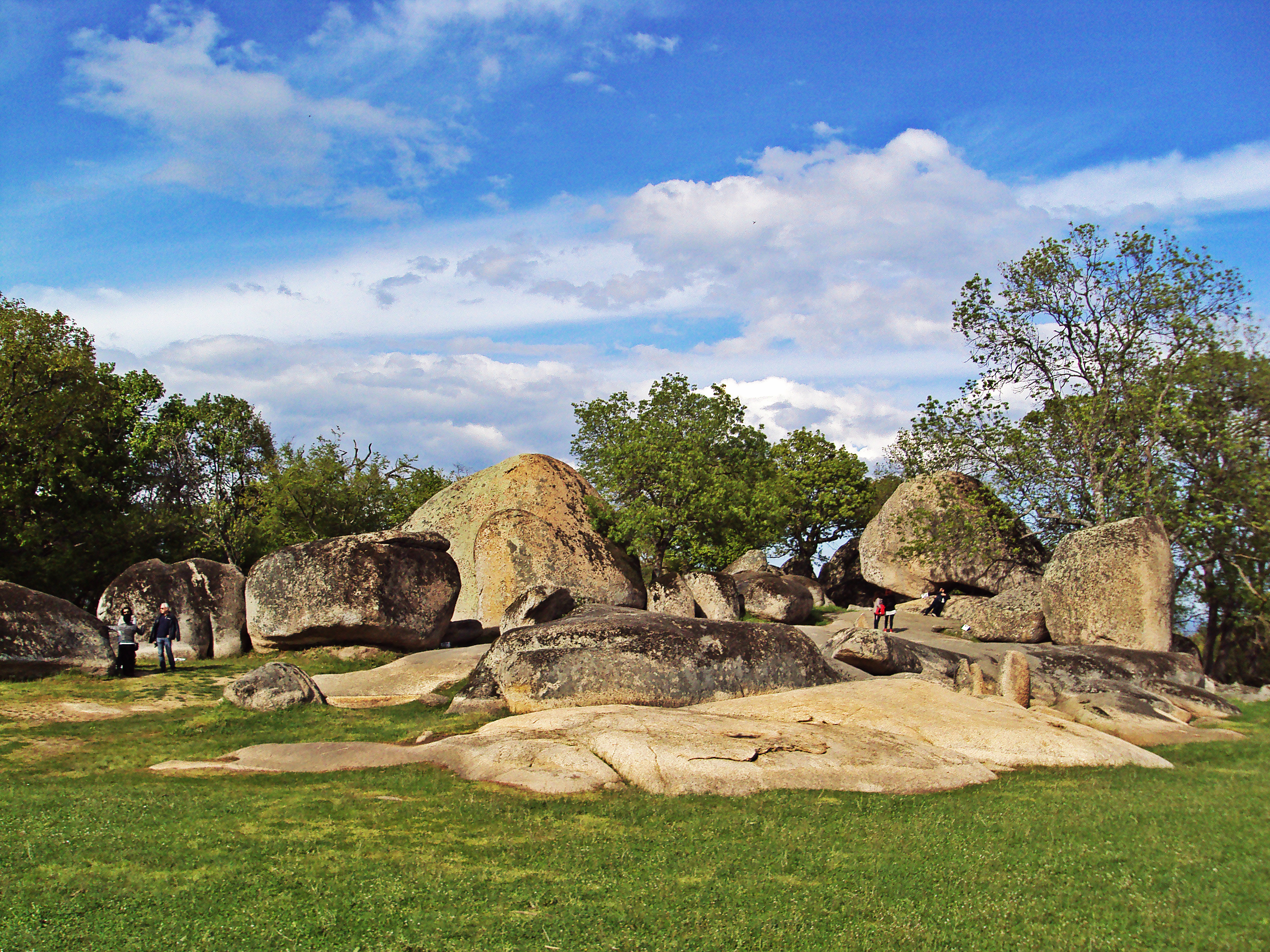
- A view of Beglik Tash

- Location within Bulgaria
- 42°18′42″N 27°46′1″E
- Type: Monument
- Location: Primorsko, Burgas Province, Bulgaria

Site notes
- Area: 6 hectares (15 acres)
- Public access: free

Beglik Tash (Bulgarian: Беглик Таш, Turkish: Beylik Taşı) is a prehistoric rock sanctuary situated on the southern Black Sea coast of Bulgaria, a few kilometers north of the city of Primorsko. It was re-used by the Thracian tribes in the Iron Age.

At the end of the 19th century, the Czech-Bulgarian historian and archaeologist Karel Škorpil produced the first scientific account of the sanctuary, which was then known as Apostol Tash. In 2002, Bulgarian archaeologists started excavations under the supervision of Tsonia Drazheva.

== Etymology ==
The meaning of Beglik Tash is probably related to the "beglik," which is the tax on sheep collected by Ottoman authorities until 1913, and a Turkish word to describe an area made of large stones, "taşlar" – a natural rock-formation consisting of megaliths of hardened magma that erupted from a Mesozoic era volcano.

== Description ==
Most of the megaliths have traces of carvings for the purposes of Thracian rituals. There are also the remains of a labyrinth that visitors can pass through. A Thracian sun-clock is formed from huge stones. There is also a 150-ton rock that rests on the ground in only two places, and a "womb-cave".

Archaeologists have found ceramic artefacts from the Early Iron Age (10th–6th century BC), classical antiquity, and the Middle Ages, as well as a man-made stone altar at the end of the natural cave which proves that it was used as a place of worship. Every day at noon, a ray of sunlight enters the narrow entrance of the cave, and projects itself on the back of cave. According to the Bulgarian archaeologist Alexander Fol some of the Thracian womb-caves had the property of letting the sunlight in only at certain times of the day, a natural phenomenon seen by the Thracians as acts of symbolic fertilization of the Earth womb or the Mother Goddess by the sun phallus of the Sun God.

The site is an open-air museum maintained by the Burgas Historical Society. It is visited annually by 40,000 tourists. Beglik Tash is located in the vicinity of two other Thracian sites: the city of Ranuli and the fortress of Pharmakida in the Strandzha Mountains.

== Gallery ==
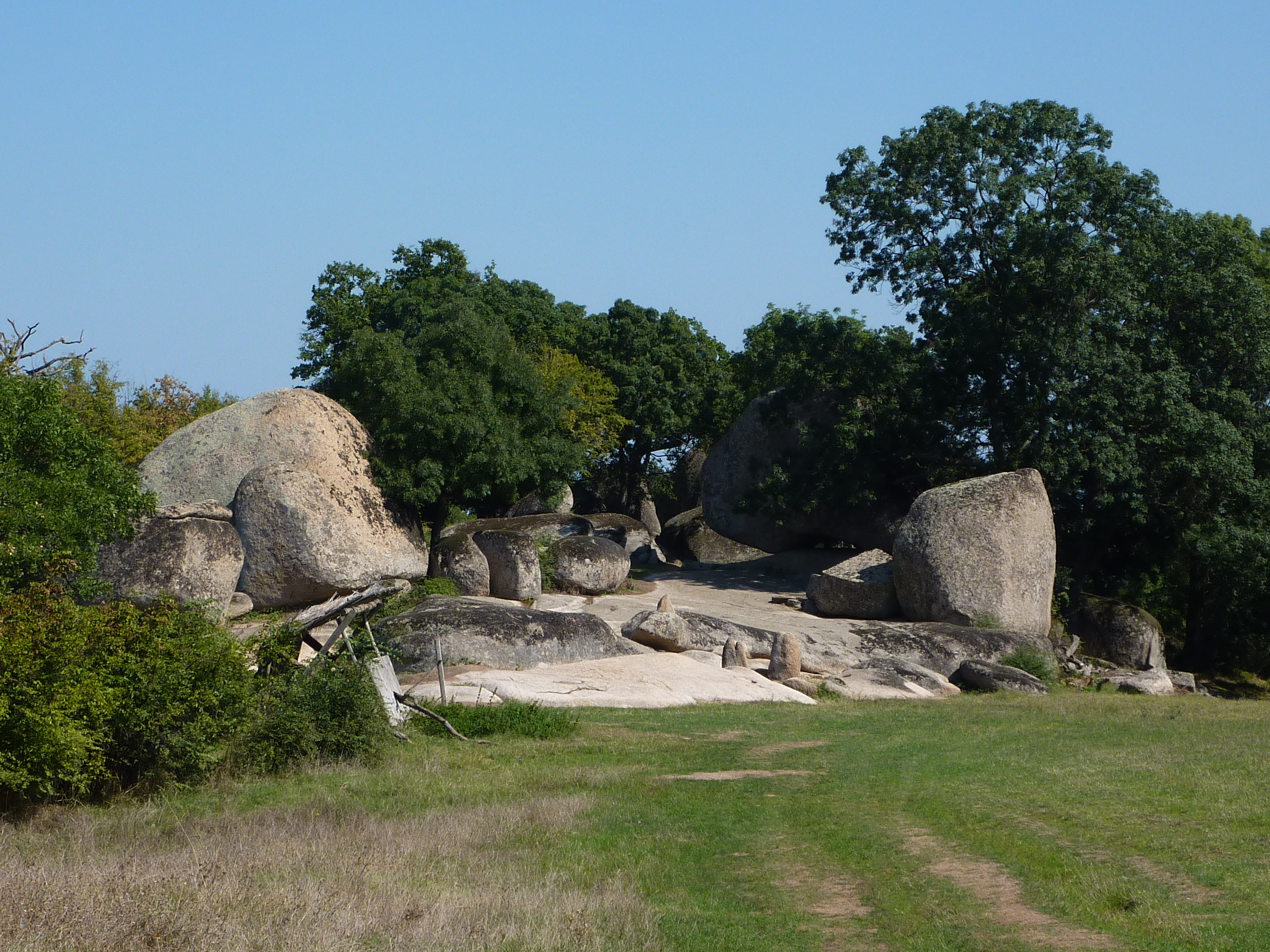
A general view

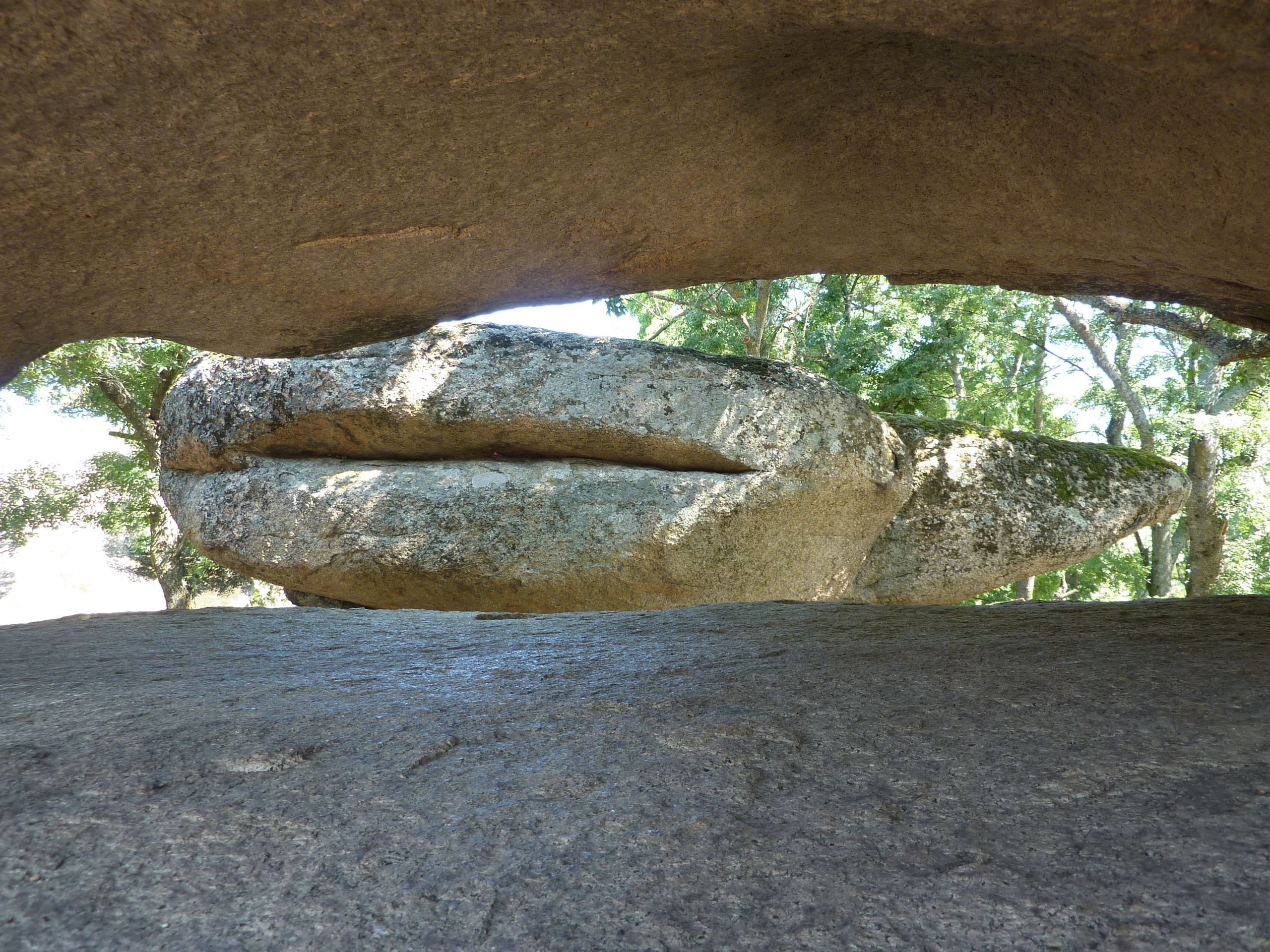
A part of the complex

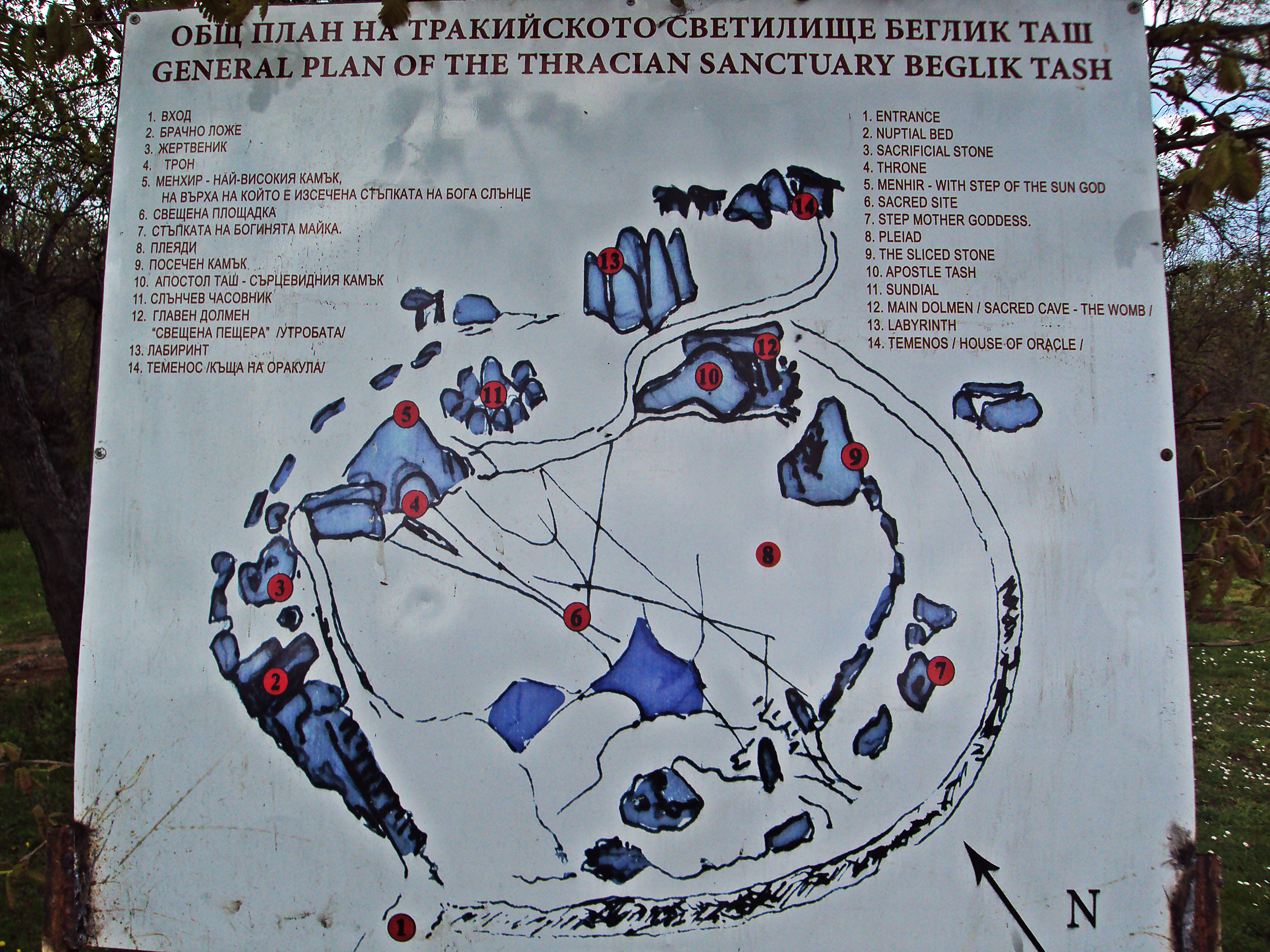
Begliktash BG General Plan

== See also ==
- Thrace
- Thracians
- Heros (mythology)
