= Mirolyubovo, Bulgaria =

Village in Burgas, Bulgaria

Mirolyubovo Миролюбово
- Village
- Location within Bulgaria
- Coordinates: 42°38′40″N 27°21′50″E
- Country: Bulgaria
- Province: Burgas Province
- Municipality: Burgas Municipality

Population (2022)
  - Total: 106
- Time zone: UTC+2 (EET)
  - Summer (DST): UTC+3 (EEST)

Mirolyubovo (Bulgarian: Миролюбово) is a village in Burgas Municipality in Burgas Province, in southeastern Bulgaria.

According to the 2022 census the village has 106 people.
