= Archaeological Museum - Burgas =

Museum in Burgas, Bulgaria

Coordinates: 42.4936°N 27.4755°E

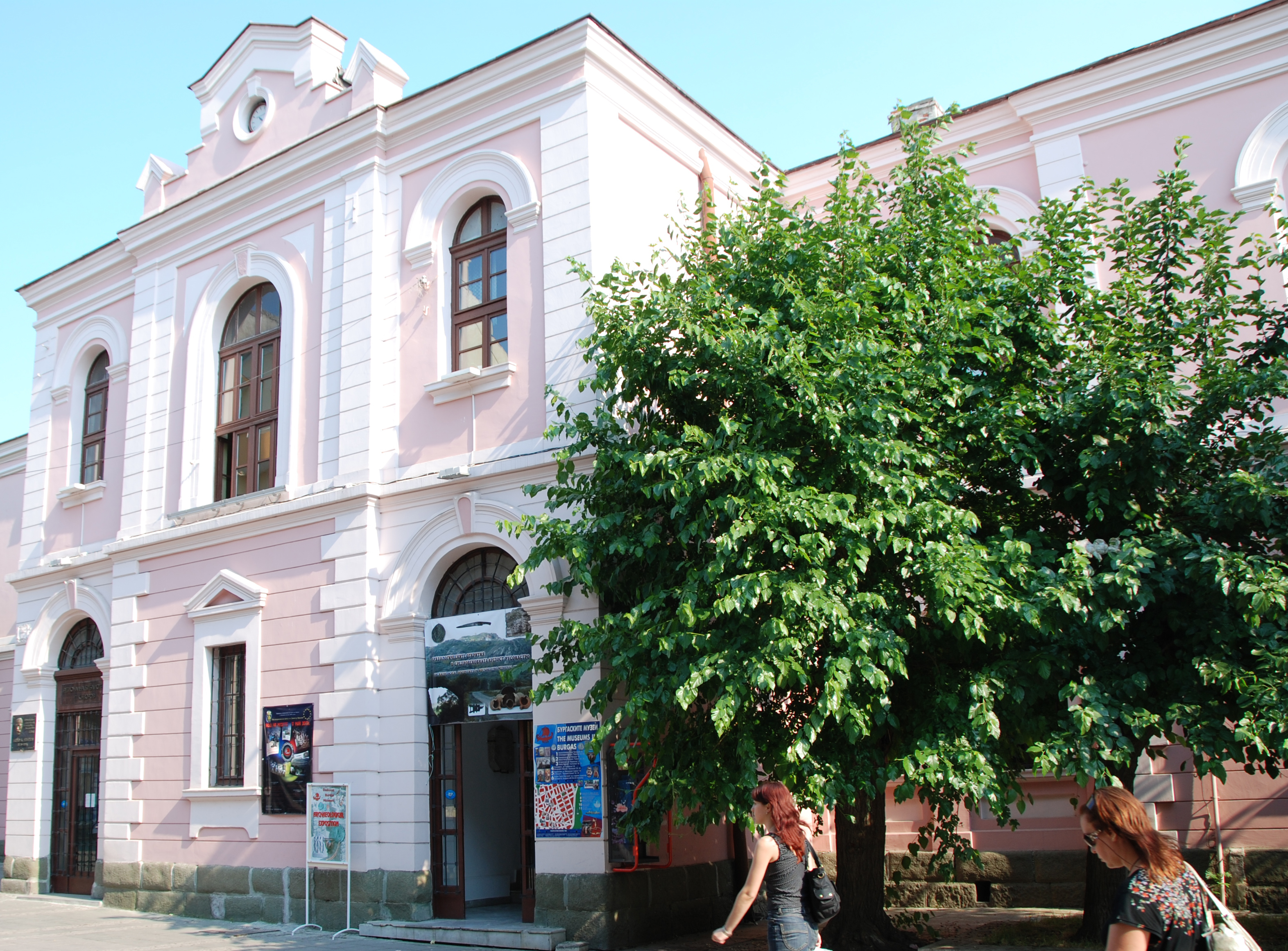
Picture of Archaeological Museum, Burgas

Archaeological Museum (Bulgarian: Археологически музей) is the oldest museum in Burgas, Bulgaria, preserving the cultural and historical heritage of some of the most ancient towns in the present Bulgarian territory - Sozopol (Apollonia), Nessebar (Messambria), Pomorie (Anhialo) and others.

Today the Archaeological museum is one of the four expositions in the Regional Historical Museum Burgas.

The museum was established in 1912 as a private museum of the Debelt Archaeological Society.

The exposition presents collections of archaeological findings related to ancient Thrace, the Greek colonies along the Black Sea coast and the time of the Roman Empire.

In the halls of the museum there are exhibits found in archaeological research from the entire Burgas region. The museum also contains the oldest statue ever found in Bulgarian lands, and one of the most complete collections of pre-monetary forms in the country and on the Balkans.

== Gallery ==
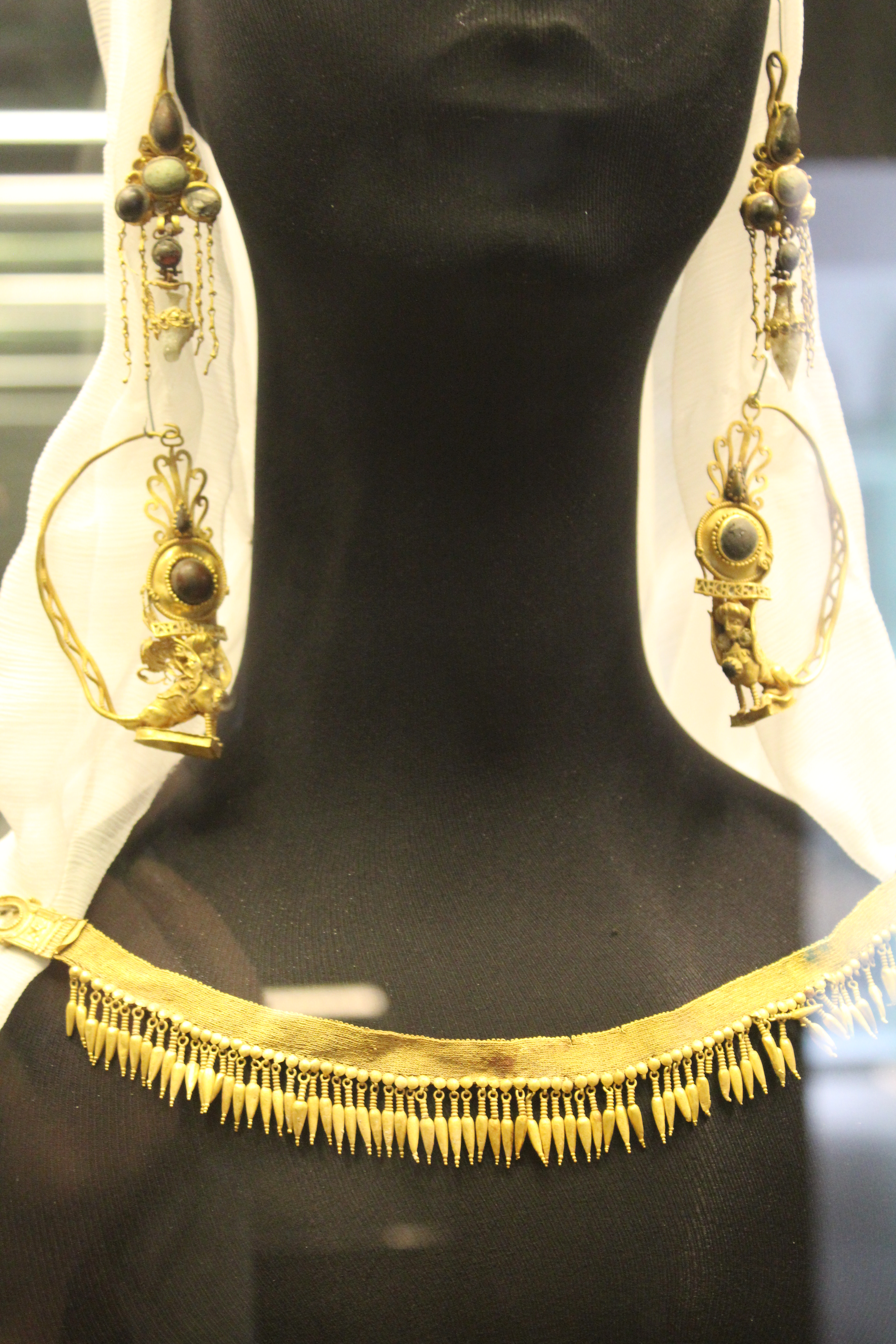
Ornaments of the Thracian priestess Leseskepra

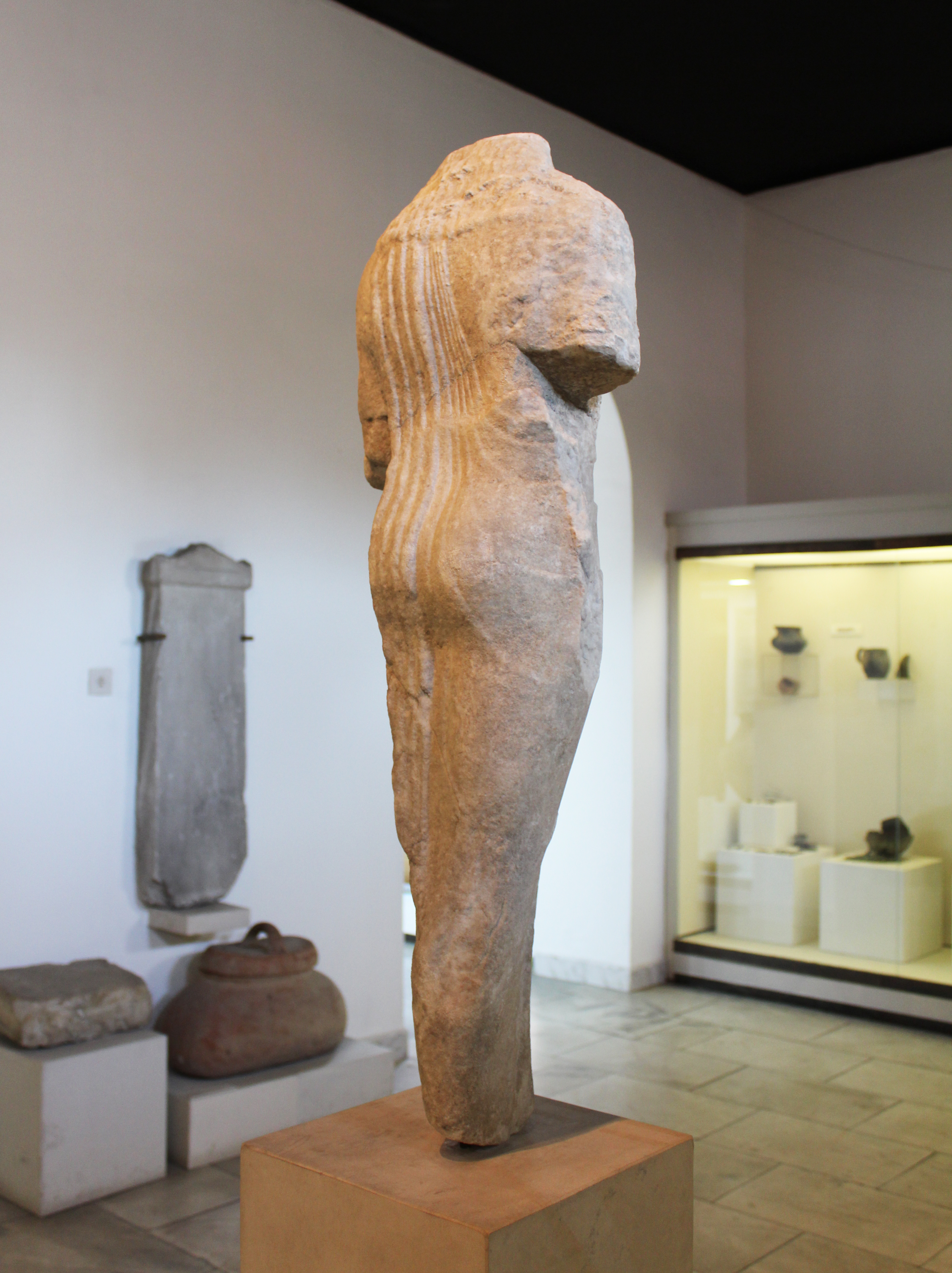
The oldest statue found in Bulgaria

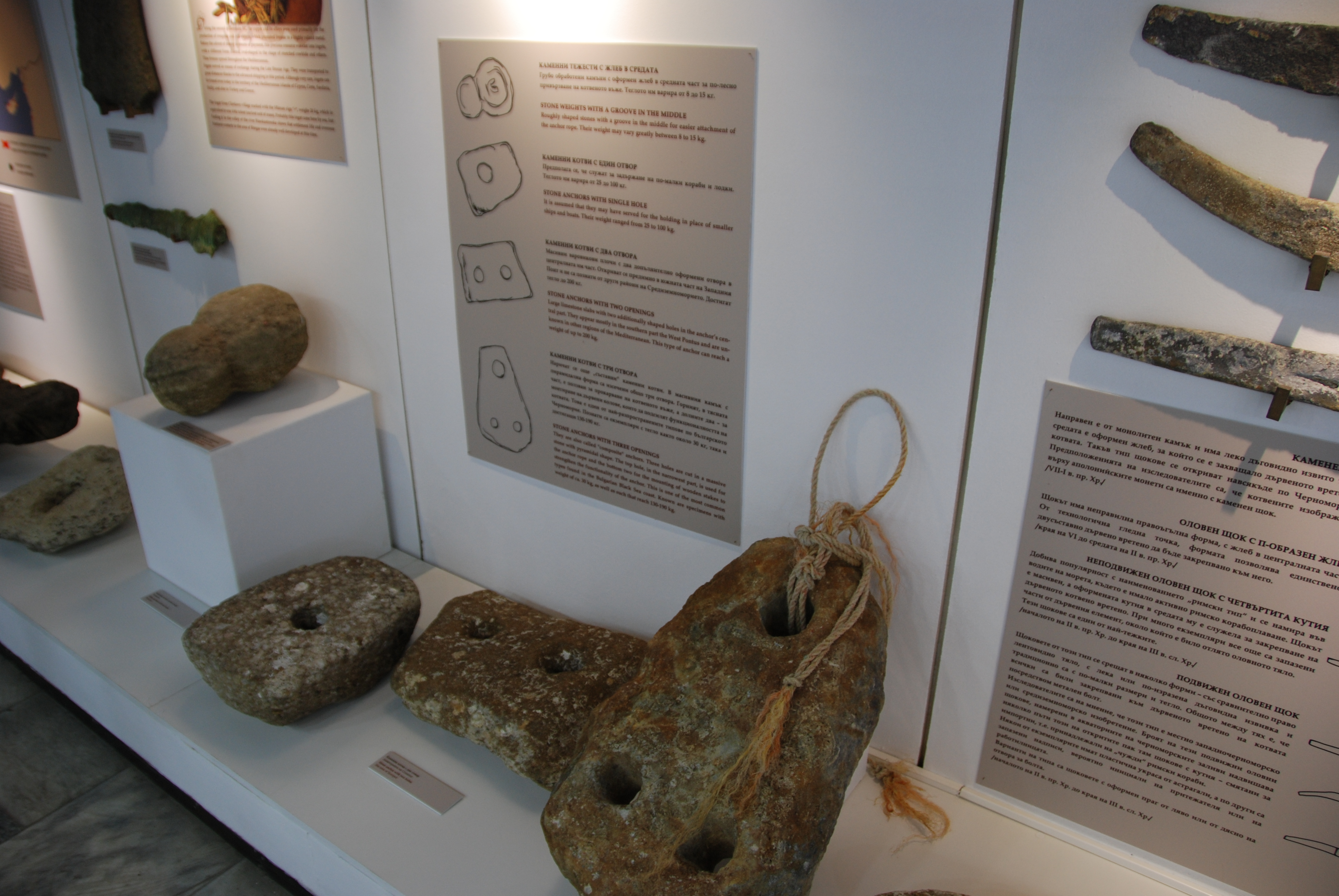
Exposition - shipping in the Black Sea

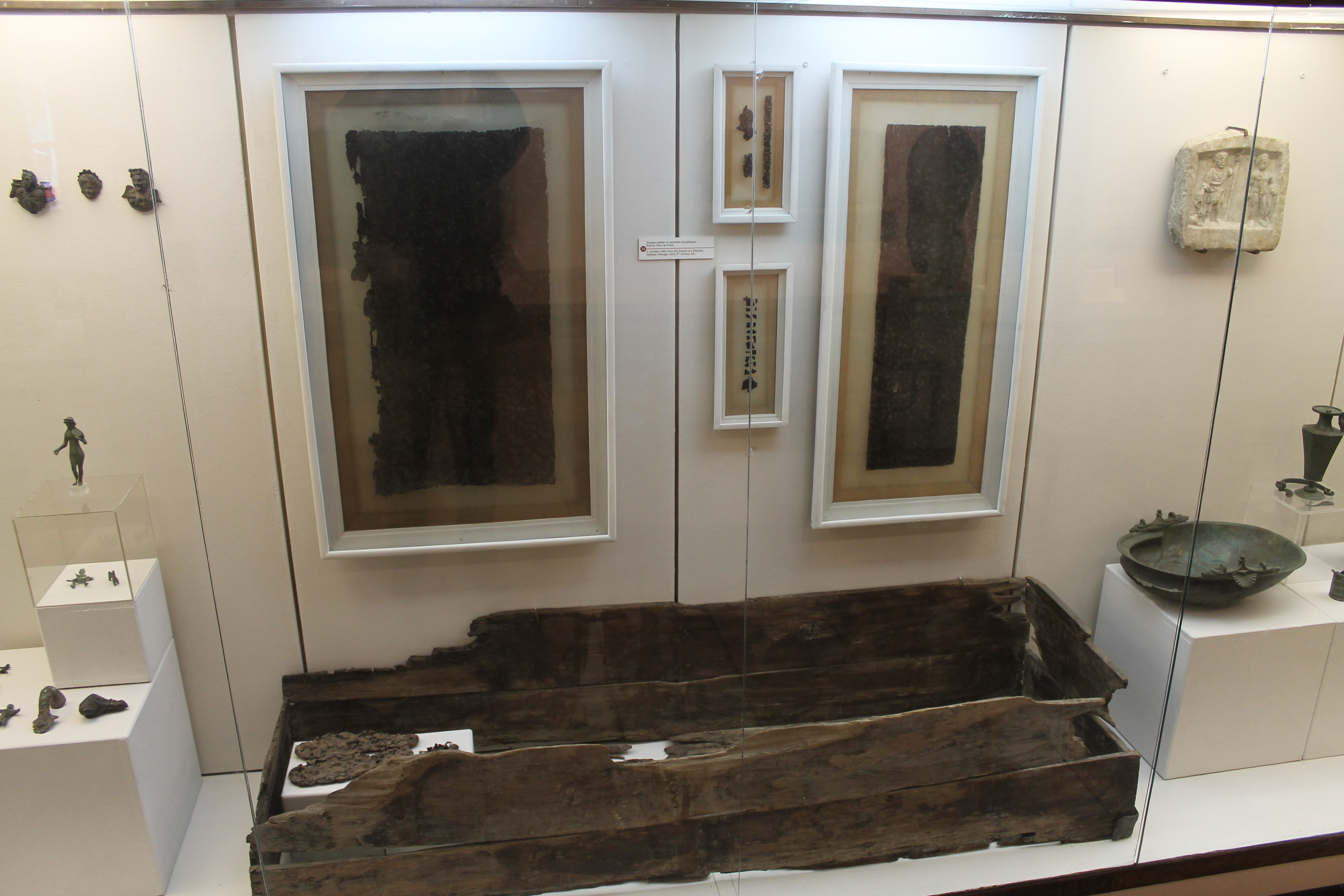
Wooden Roman Ark

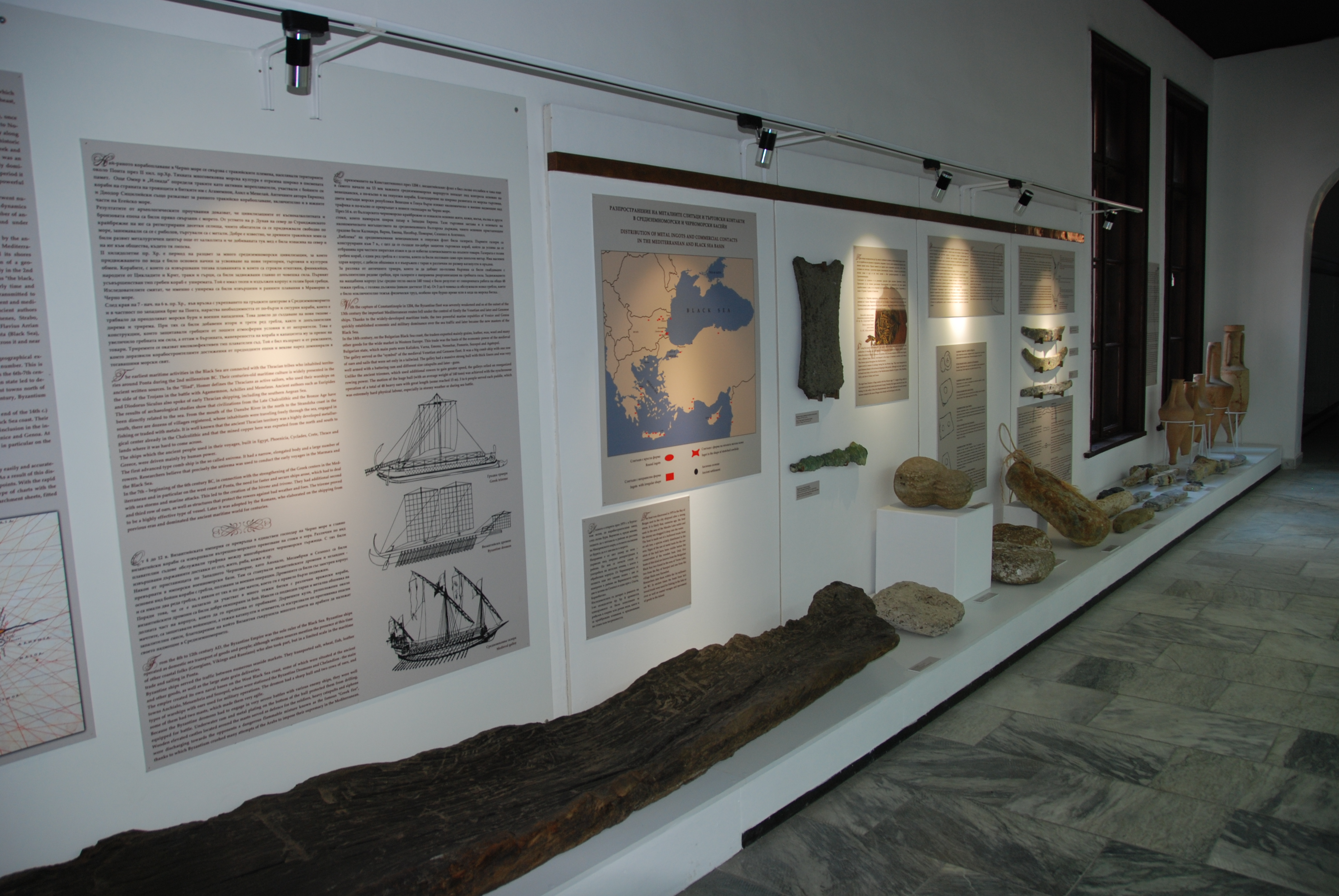
Wood Boat
