= Nikola Mollov =

- Born: May 11, 1926; Bourgas, Bulgaria
- Died: July 27, 2014 (aged 88); Plovdiv, Bulgaria
- Education: University of Sofia
- Scientific career
- Fields: Organic Chemistry, Chemistry of Natural Products, Organic Synthesis
- Workplaces: Plovdiv University "Paisii Hilendarski", Faculty of Chemistry

Professor Nikola Mikhaylov Mollov (Bulgarian: Никола Михайлов Моллов) was a Bulgarian organic chemist, researcher and university lecturer.

== Life and career ==
Nikola Mollov graduated from high school in his hometown of Burgas, Bulgaria. He obtained his degree in chemistry from the Faculty of Physics and Mathematics of Sofia State University in 1951. He became an assistant professor in the Department of Organic Chemistry in 1952 and worked there until 1962. In 1957 he acquired his Ph.D. degree called "candidate of chemical sciences" and was the first scientist nominated with this title. In 1962, he obtained a senior research fellow II position at the Department of Chemistry of natural organic compounds at the Institute of Organic Chemistry, Bulgarian Academy of Sciences (BAS), Sofia where he worked until 1974. N. Mollov was awarded with the title "Doctor of chemical sciences" (D.Sc.) for his outstanding contributions in the area of natural product chemistry summarized in the first doctorate thesis in Bulgaria.

In 1974 N. Mollov became a professor in organic chemistry at the Faculty of Chemistry of Plovdiv University "Paisiy Hilendarski". Under his scientific leadership for 15 years the Department of Chemistry advanced and became one of the leading scientific and educational institutions in the country.

== Scientific works ==
The scientific research of Professor N. Mollov is in the field of natural and synthetic physiologically active substances. Under the supervision of Academician Bogdan Kurtev he developed a new method of organic synthesis which gained popularity as a "Reaction of Kurtev and Mollov".

In his career as a researcher Prof. N. Mollov worked over 10 years in the field of natural organic compounds of plant origin. He studied the chemical composition of series of Bulgarian plants for alkaloids and diterpene lactones.

The department "Chemistry of alkaloids" at the Bulgarian Academy of Sciences, headed by Prof. N. Mollov, focussed its main research on the area of isoquinoline alkaloids. A series of plants, common in Bulgaria, were thoroughly investigated for alkaloids. The most important results were obtained for plants belonging to the genera Thalictrum and Fumaria. In Bulgaria, the widely distributed genus was Thalictrum minus, for the alkaloid content of which there were not data available at the time. Other spontaneously growing species were Th. foetidum, Th. simplex and Th. aquilegifolium. The studied plants contained 27 alkaloids, 14 of which were discovered for the first time. Among them: thalmetine, O-methylthalmetine, thalmelatine, thalmelatidine (Thalictrum species) and bulgaramine (Fumaria officinalis). Most important were the benzylisoquinoline-aporphine derivatives, a relatively new group of alkaloids. The results obtained were summarized in a monograph in English, issued by the Publishing House of the Hungarian Academy of Sciences.

Significant results were obtained by Prof. Mollov on the study of diterpene lactones in plants of the genus Teucrium (germander). These studies were carried out mainly at the Institute of Organic Chemistry of the Academy of Sciences, partly at the Department of Organic Chemistry, University of Plovdiv, with co-workers of Prof. Mollov in the respective departments.

The second research area of Prof. N. Mollov was developed during the years 1974 to 1992 mainly in the Department of Organic Chemistry of the University of Plovdiv "P. Hilendarski" and at the Laboratory of biologically active substances in Plovdiv site of the Academy of Sciences. The results obtained lead to the invention of several amide herbicides such as Alachlor, Dual Gold et al. Consequently, several new laboratory and manufacturing technologies were developed with the participation of co-workers from the R&D department of "Agria" chemical plant in Plovdiv. Many new compounds were synthesized with expected pesticide activity that was later confirmed by biological screening in the country and abroad.

As a result of all these studies, over 120 scientific papers have been published in national and international scientific journals as well as in 14 author's patents. In addition, these findings were included in 14 Ph.D. dissertations by research fellows and assistant professors as well as many student's thesis.

During his work at the Faculty of Chemistry of the University of Plovdiv "P. Hilendarski" Prof. Mollov worked in collaboration with the Institute of Organic Chemistry (IOCh) of the Bulgarian Academy of Sciences (BAS) and since 1980 he headed the Laboratory of Biologically Active Substances of IOCh at the BAS site in Plovdiv. He was Associate Dean and Dean of the Faculty of Chemistry in Plovdiv.

== Recognition and awards ==
For his scientific and educational activity Prof. N. Mollov was awarded with many awards and medals. He was nominated with the title "Honorary Fellow of Science" by the State Council of Bulgaria (1987).
