= Meden Rudnik =

Bulgarian neighbourhood

Coordinates: 42°27′25″N 27°24′42″E

Meden Rudnik (Bulgarian: Меден Рудник) is the youngest and the biggest neighbourhood of Burgas, which is the biggest city in South Eastern Bulgaria. Its population is about 70,000. In 1976 the village Meden Rudnik with population of 6,500 people was added to the territory of Burgas and the first apartment building was built in 1976. The old name of the neighbourhood was Kara Bair (Bulgarian: Кара Баир), which translated from Turkish in English means: Black Hill. Is called Meden Rudnik, because there was a copper mine near. The village Kara Bair was established by bulgarian refugees of the Second Balkan war in 1913, coming from Western Thrace and Aegaen Macedonia.

Meden Rudnik has five schools. They are: Professional School for Computer Programming and Innovation, "Elin Pelin" Primary School, "Petko Rosen" Secondary School, "Nayden Gerov" Primary School, "Konstantin Petkanov" Secondary School.

== Note ==
- This is a partial translation of the original article in Bulgarian Wikipedia
