= Balgarovo =

Village in Bulgaria

- Location of Balgarovo
- Coordinates: 42°37′N 27°18′E
- Country: Bulgaria
- Province: Burgas
- Municipality: Burgas Municipality

Government
  - Mayor: Irina Ivanova
- Elevation: 72 m (236 ft)

Population (15 Dec 2004)
  - Total: 2,210
- Time zone: UTC+2 (EET)
  - Summer (DST): UTC+3 (EEST)
- Postal Code: 8110
- Area code: 05915

Balgarovo (Bulgarian: Българово [ˈbɤɫɡɐrovo]) is a small town in southeastern Bulgaria. It is located in Burgas Municipality and is close to the town of Kameno.

Until 1964, it was a village. In the period between 1964 – 1974 its status was urban-type settlement.

== Demography ==
The town of Balgarovo had a population of 1,528 as of December 2018. Nearly all inhabitants are ethnic Bulgarians (97%).

Ethnic groups in the town of Balgarovo (2011 census)
Ethnic group	Percentage
Bulgarians	97.4%
Turks	0.4%
Romani	0.5%
others and indefinable	1.7%

== Gallery ==
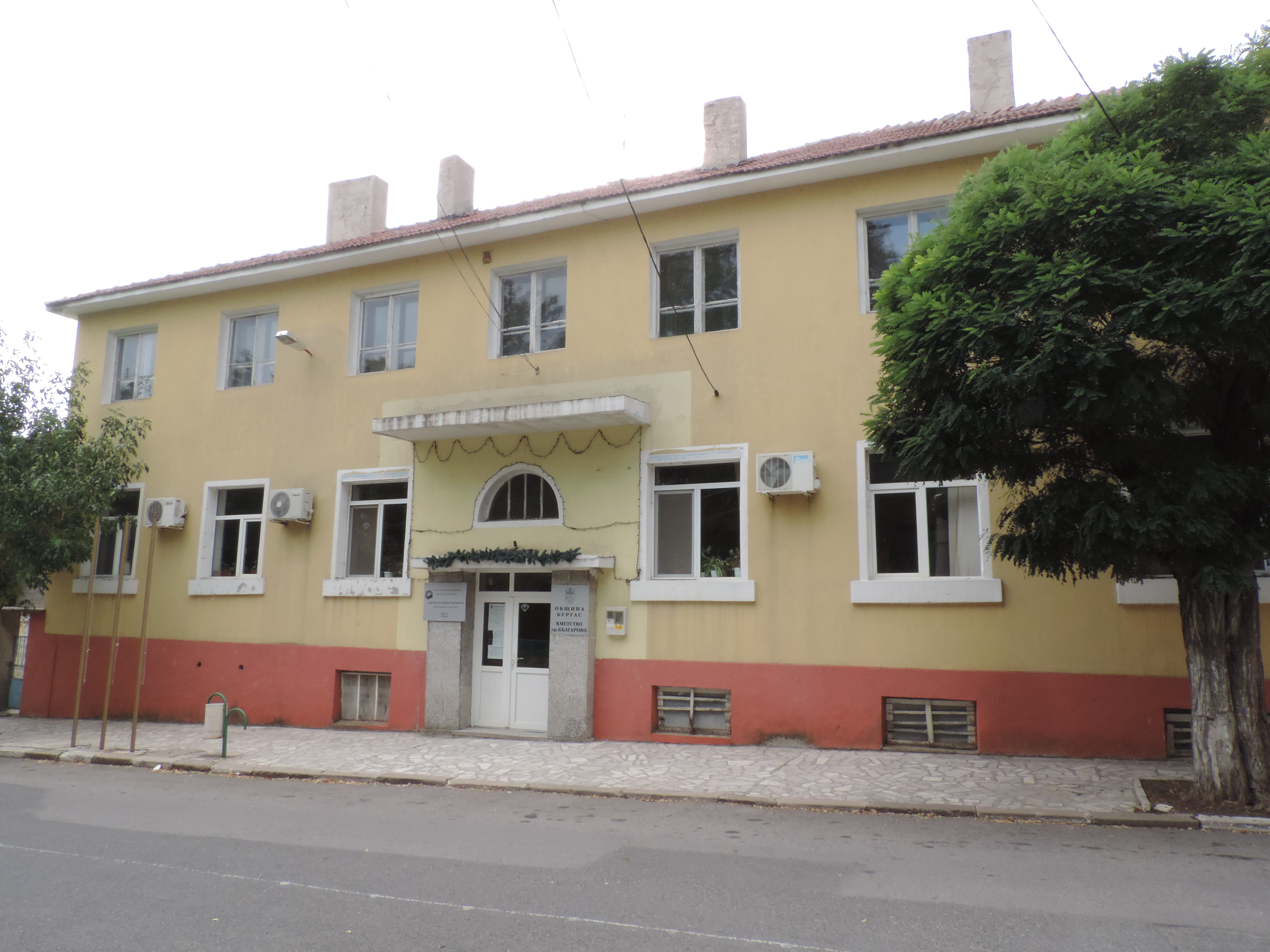
The mayor's office

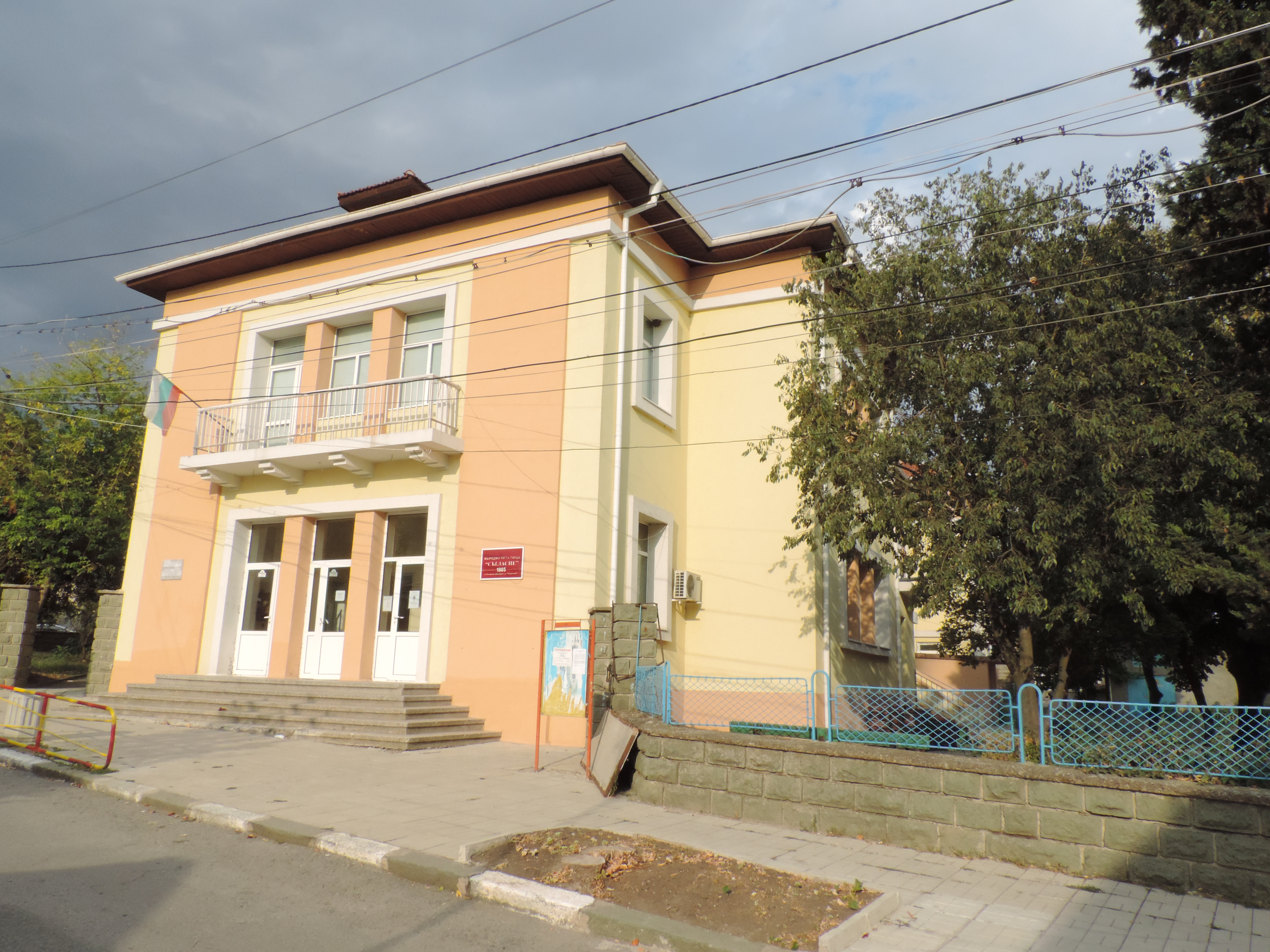
Chitalishte "Saglasie"

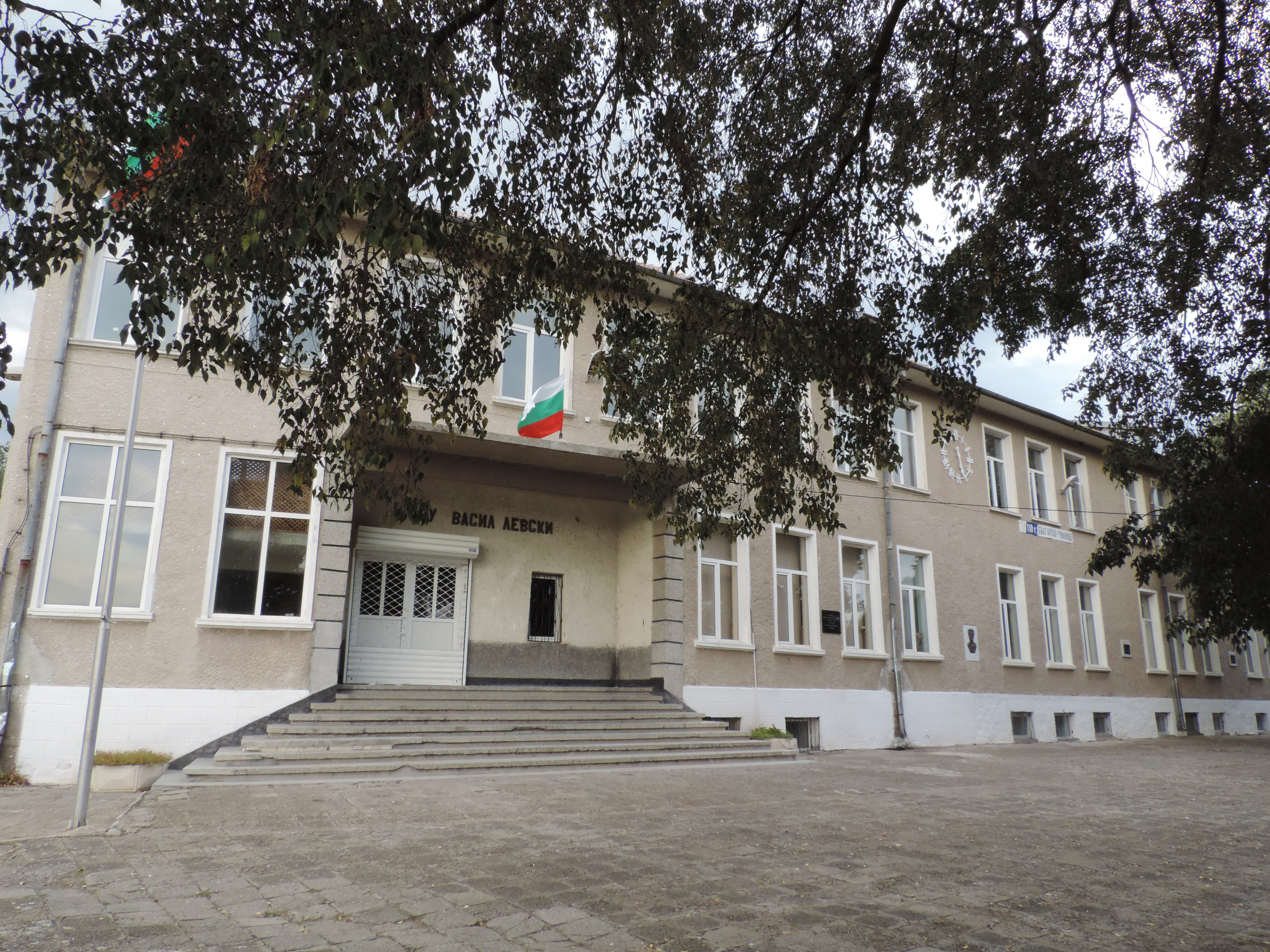
Elementary school "Vasil Levski"
