= School of Commerce, Bourgas =

Vocational college in Bourgas, Bulgaria

School of Commerce
- Type: public
- Established: 1905
- President: R. Panova
- Administrative staff: 50
- Undergraduates: 600
- Location: Bourgas, Bulgaria
- Campus: urban
- Website: http://www.ti-bs.org

The School of Commerce (Bulgarian: Търговска гимназия) is a vocational college in the city of Bourgas (Bulgaria), specialized in the fields of economics, finance, management and accounting education. Established on October 1, 1905, it is the second oldest business school in Bulgaria.

== Programs ==
A typical academic program spans for 10 semesters (5 years) and, upon successful completion of all academic requirements, a graduate receives a diploma of high education with a professional designation. The latter serves to indicate the special academic level that this type of institutions represents.

Another distinctive feature of the program is the language requirements. All students are initially divided by general majors:

- Finance (Banking and Insurance)
- Marketing
- Management
- Economics
- Commerce
- Accounting (Bookkeeping)

and further sub-divided in their respective language specializations in English, French, or German (e.g. major: Management with Business English). The first 2 semesters are heavily weighted against the foreign language educations with approximately 20 hours per week designated for lectures and practical training in some foreign language. Consequently, the program focuses on the business education and market simulation games.

The school participates in an innovative international simulation program, supported by Rotary International and CulturContact (Vienna), where students get to manage virtual companies in various industries. The competition is based on the modern game theory where the companies compete against similar entities established in other European business schools (in this case, mainly Austrian business schools).

== History ==
In the beginning of the 20th century, the Bulgarian economy is going through drastic changes characterized with swift economic growth and rising demand for specialized work force. At that time, the city of Bourgas establishes itself as one of the biggest industrial hubs in the country and the local business elite realizes that it needs to better re-align the interests of the capital with these of the academia. Thus, on September 7, 1905, with a decision #21360, The Ministry of Commerce and Agriculture expresses its support for the creation of the School of Commerce (Bulgarian: Търговска гимназия).

== Sports ==
The school has various sport programs with the most famous being in basketball and volleyball. The colors of the school's uniforms are black and yellow and the logo represents the first 2 letters from the school's name in Bulgarian (ИТ).

Under the head coach Constantin Peev, the basketball team of the School of Commerce was undisputed champion of the city for the period 1992–1997 and won the third place in the 1993 national finals.
