= Cherno more =

Cherno More is the Bulgarian name of the Black Sea (see: Bulgarian Black Sea Coast)

It may also refer to:

- Cherno More (village) — a village in the Burgas municipality, Burgas Province, Bulgaria
- PFC Cherno More Varna — a football club from Varna, Bulgaria
- Cherno More IG Varna — a basketball team from Varna, Bulgaria
- Cherno More BASK Varna — a volleyball team from Varna, Bulgaria
