= Ivan Karayotov =

Bulgarian archaeologist and historian (born 1941)

- Born: 20 December 1941; Lozen, Haskovo Province, Bulgaria
- Died: January 30, 2018 (aged 76)
- Occupation(s): Archaeologist, historian

Ivan Dimitrov Karayotov (Bulgarian: Иван Димитров Карайотов) was a Bulgarian archaeologist and historian who studied ancient and medieval archaeology and history.

He worked at the Regional Museum of Burgas from 1972.

Karayotov died in 2018.

== Bibliography (Monographs) ==
- (in Bulgarian) Монетосеченето на Месамбрия. Burgas 1992.
- The coinage of Mesambria.
  - Vol. 1: Silver and gold coins of Mesambria. Centre of Underwater Archaeology, Sozopol 1994.
  - Vol. 2: Bronze coins of Mesambria. Centre for Maritime and Regional Studies, Sozopol 2009. ISBN 978-954-92170-3-2.
- (in Bulgarian) Водите на Хемус и Странджа. Burgas 2004
- (in Bulgarian) Остров “Света Анастасия”. Burgas 2004

== Literature ==
- (in Bulgarian) Иван Карайотов в Кой кой е в елита на Бургас и региона : [Биографичен справочник] / Състав. Пеньо Костадинов, Стойчо Кьосев. - Бургас, 1996/1997, p. 85-86.
- (in Bulgarian) Иван Карайотов в Кой кой е в българската култура : [Справочник] / Състав. Пенка Добрева, Таня Войникова, Стефка Георгиева. - Варна : Славена, 1998, p. 243.
- (in Bulgarian) Илия Зайков Археология : Стихотворение, Изв. Нар. музей - Бургас, 4, 2002
- Studia in honorem Ivani Karayotov. Burgas 2002
