= Hripsime Srapyan =

Armenian linguist of Italian (1928–2013)

- Հռիփսիմե Սրապյան
- Born: 28 December 1928; Burgas, Bulgaria
- Died: 10 April 2013 (aged 84); Yerevan, Armenia
- Education: Yerevan Art and Theater Institute
- Employer: Sundukyan State Academic Theatre
- Children: 2
- Awards: Order of the Star of Italian Solidarity

Hripsime Srapyan (Armenian: Հռիփսիմե Սրապյան, Persian: هریپسیمه سراپیان, 28 December 1928 – 10 April 2013) was an Armenian actress, linguist and pedagogue. She specialised in the Italian language and was appointed to the Order of the Star of Italian Solidarity in recognition of her work.

== Biography ==
Srapyan was born on 28 December 1928 in Burgas, Bulgaria, to an Armenian family. Her parents were Karapet Srapyan and Manik Srapyan. She studied at an Italian school in Bulgaria and moved to Armenia with her family in 1948.

Srapyan studied at the Yerevan Art and Theater Institute [hy] and worked as an actress at Sundukyan State Academic Theatre after graduation.

Srapyan married actor Mamikon Manukyan [hy] and they had 2 children together.

Srapyan taught Italian at the Yerevan State Conservatory (now the Komitas State Conservatory of Yerevan) and at Yerevan State University. She also wrote eight textbooks on the Italian language.

In 2002, Srapyan was made an honorary citizen of Italy and was appointed to the Order of the Star of Italian Solidarity for her "contributions to teaching of Italian in Armenia and dissemination of Italian culture."

Srapyan died on 10 April 2013 in Yerevan, Armenia, aged 84.
