= Church of Sts. Cyril and Methodius, Burgas =

Church in Burgas, Bulgaria

Coordinates: 42.4962°N 27.4741°E

Church of Saints Cyril and Methodius
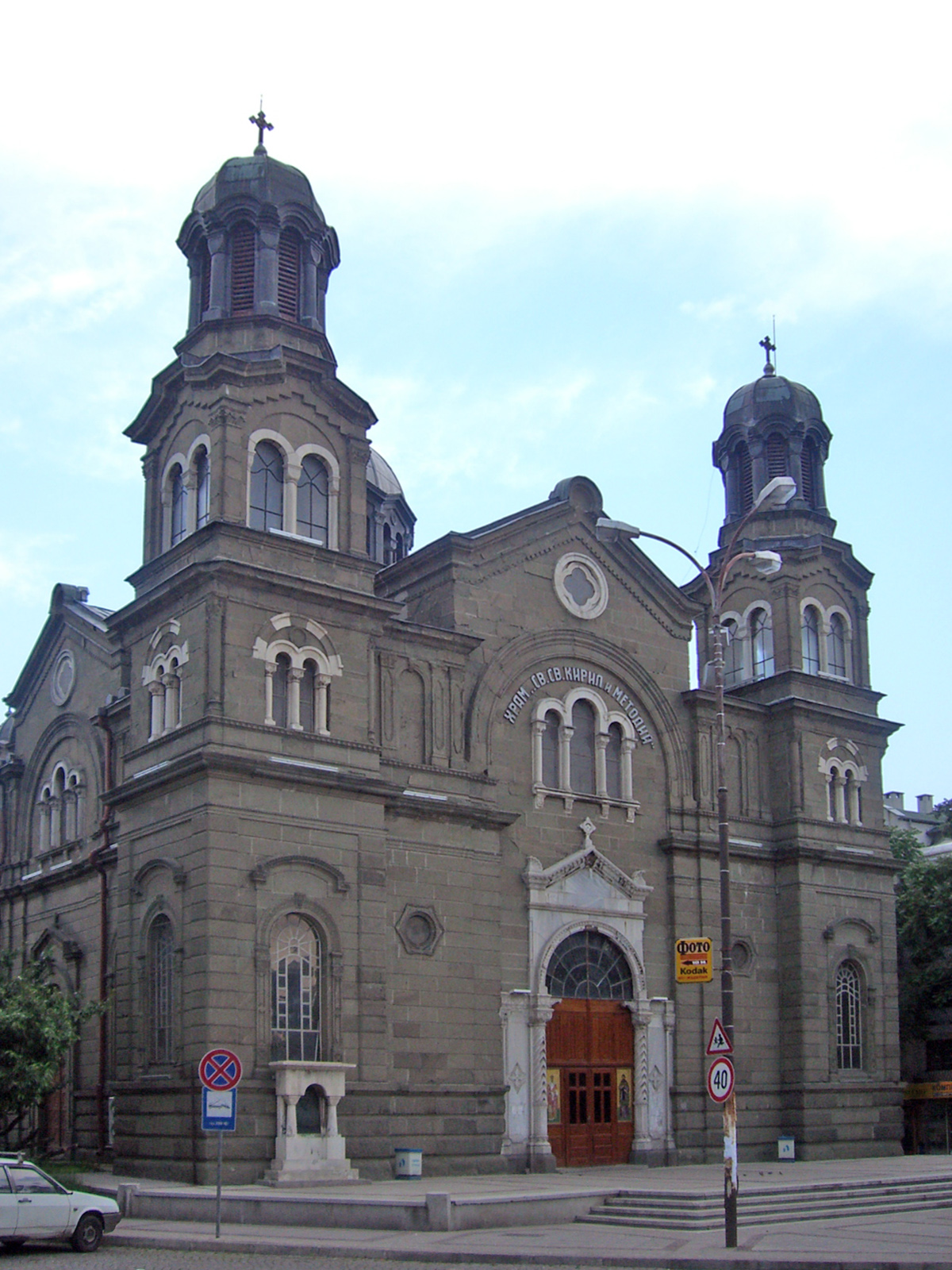
- Church of Saints Cyril and Methodius
- Church of Saints Cyril and Methodius
- Location: Burgas
- Country: Bulgaria
- Denomination: Bulgarian Orthodox

History
- Status: functioning church
- Dedication: Saints Cyril and Methodius
- Consecrated: 1907

Architecture
- Architect: Ricardo Toscani
- Years built: 1897–1907

Specifications
- Height: 33 m (108 ft)

Administration
- Diocese: Diocese of Sliven

"Sts. Cyril and Methodius" is an Orthodox church building in Burgas, Bulgaria.

The church building is included in the list of the 100 national tourist sites from 2022. It has been declared an architectural, construction and artistic monument of culture (immovable cultural value) of national importance. The church building is built in the likeness of a cathedral church - three naves with a central apse; it is called a cathedral (i.e. a church of the metropolitan in the city seat of the diocese), but it has no such status (because the seat of the diocese is in Sliven).

It is 33 meters high and is located in the center of the city, on Saint Cyril and Methodius Square, on the site of a small wooden church, which was the only Exarchist church building in the city before the Liberation. It was built in the period 1897-1907 according to the project of the Italian architect Riccardo Toscani, who worked in the city.

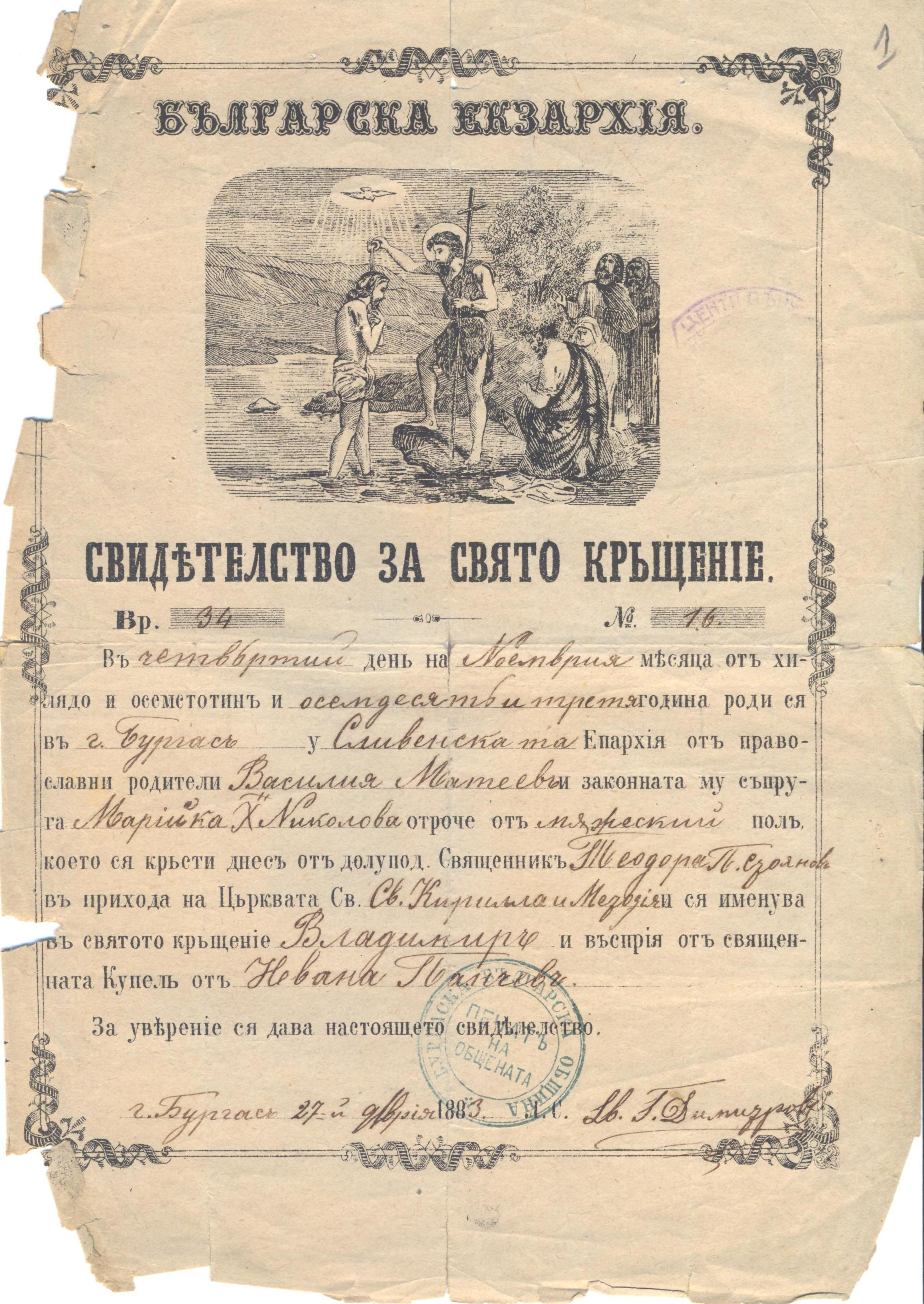
Baptismal certificate of Vladimir Vassilev, issued by priest Teodor Stoyanov

"St. Cyril and Methodius" differs from the churches built during the so-called Bulgarian Revival and in the first years after the liberation from Ottoman rule. The temple is a three-nave cruciform basilica, oriented along the east–west axis. The central apse with the altar and the richly decorated iconostasis are located in the eastern part of the church. The nave divides the interior of the church into three naves by means of five pairs of supporting marble columns. The central and largest dome is built over the main nave of the church; above the side two naves are built another four smaller domes. The main dome rises on a tall twelve-sided drum with windows. The narthex in the western part of the church is higher than the central nave. The central entrance is on the west facade, and the other smaller entrances on the north and south sides are only open for special ceremonies. Master Mityo Tsanev from Dryanovo and Kuzman Dimitrov from Macedonia took part in the construction of the church. The brothers Cyril and Methodius are depicted on the beautiful stained glass window at the main entrance of the church. The church was painted by the artists Gyuzhenov and Kozhuharov, who also painted the national cathedral "St. Alexander Nevsky" in Sofia.

== History ==
The history of the church building is connected with Father Georgi Stoyanov Djelebov, who donated his own house to build the first Bulgarian church building in Burgas, even though he had 8 children. Father Georgi developed apostolic activity for the recognition of the Bulgarian cause and the establishment of the Bulgarian church in the entire Burgas region - from the region of Anchialo (Pomorie), the region of Mesemvria (Nessebar), through the region of Malko Tarnovo, to the region of Lozengrad, visiting over 300 villages. Visiting the villages in the region of Malko Tarnovo and Lozengrad, he worked together with Father Petko Georgiev Popov, a zealous supporter of the Bulgarian identity, to establish church independence. The apostolic activity of the two priests began in 1867 and continued until the final inclusion of the Bulgarian population to the Bulgarian cause and the Bulgarian church, touring the area in most cases on foot, winter, summer, in cold, heat and rain - this is what the historian Georgi pop Ayanov wrote in his book "Malko Tarnovo i..." as early as 1939. Father Petko G. Popov founded 2 churches in 1879 (which are still active today), and together with teacher Kiro Petrov Mostrov created the first school, laying the foundations of a beautiful and attractive town on the Southern Black Sea coast - Primorsko.

On May 24, 1868, in Burgas, they made the second serious attempt to celebrate the memory of the brothers Cyril and Methodius, after the first attempt was failed by the Greek priests, who closed the church and went out of town, even though they were officially invited to the service. For the celebration of the so-called all-Slavic holiday in 1868, Father Georgi decided not to seek the assistance of the Greek priests. This first celebration of the holy brothers takes place outdoors outside the city, near the windmill of Hristo Borata (Borata's Mill). Then it was somewhere in the area of today's Third Polyclinic, near General Gurko Street.

Father Georgi stood at the head of the new church-school board, organized by him, and already at the first meeting of the board, a decision was made to find funds through subscriptions and donations to open a Bulgarian school and church, and for this purpose he gave up his own house in Burgas, at the place where today stands the church "St. St. Cyril and Methodius". After some adaptation, the church and the school were already ready for service in them, and in 1869 the first church service was performed in the so-called Church Slavonic language (Old Bulgarian language) by Father Georgi.

In the same year, 1869, the Bulgarian school was reopened, and Boyan (Stiliyan) Keremidchiev from Yambol was appointed as a teacher, and Father Dimitar from Karnobat was invited as a priest. Father George devoted himself to apostolic service for the spiritual and political liberation of his brothers. He believes that spiritual liberation must precede political liberation.

When in 1869-1870 it was discussed that the issuing of a Sultan's firman for the establishment of a Bulgarian exarchy was imminent, Father Georgi again went out to the villages and outside the Burgas district, but also to all the southern districts of the former Burgas district, to collect signatures and stamps for the famous mahzyars (petitions) to the sultan, with which the secession of the Bulgarians from the Greek patriarchate was openly sought. Father Georgi's great merit was not only in his active participation in the church struggle, but also in his concern that he opened Bulgarian churches and schools, placed teachers and priests in all the villages, more than 300, which he was able to visit in his tour.

== Renovation ==
In 2010, the construction of an underground parking lot began on the St. Cyril and Methodius Square located next to the church. Excavation and pumping of groundwater during the construction caused the foundation of the church building to settle and significant cracks in its structure, due to which the church was closed in 2011.

In 2015, the walls of the church were strengthened using a high-tech method with carbon fibers. Tensioners have also been installed, which tighten the walls and absorb the tension in the event of an earthquake. Such tensioners are also installed in the inner part of the church. Since the construction is of stone masonry without structural elements, in order to ensure good stability of the church, holes were dug under its foundation, in which pressure-cast concrete piles (about 150 pieces with a length of 8 to 12 m and a diameter of 1, 5m). The author of the project for the strengthening is Prof. Yordan Milev. The frescoes were removed for restoration even before the strengthening of the interior walls, domes and arches of the church began. The frescoes are in a restoration workshop where they will be cleaned and processed before being returned to their places. The separation and processing of the surface plaster was carried out using a special technology in order to avoid possible damage to the frescoes during the repair work inside the church building. The fragments with images of saints and biblical scenes that are being restored have a total area of over 200 m2.

The Church of "Saints Cyril and Methodius" reopens its doors after the large-scale renovation for the holiday of Burgas - Nicholas Day in 2016.
