= Cherno More (village) =

Village in Burgas, Bulgaria

- Village
- Location of Cherno More
- Coordinates: 42°37′N 27°29′E
- Country: Bulgaria
- Province: Burgas Province
- Municipality: Burgas Municipality

Population (2011)
  - Total: 2,361
- Time zone: UTC+2 (EET)
  - Summer (DST): UTC+3 (EEST)

Cherno More (Bulgarian: Черно море, lit. 'Black sea') is a village in Burgas Municipality in southeastern Bulgaria.

== Demographics ==
According to 2011 Bulgarian census, the village had Bulgarian majority.

Ethnicity	People count
Bulgarians	1739
Turks	146
Romanians	31
Others	28
Prefer not to answer	12
Not stated	12
Total	2361
