= Burgas Municipality =

Municipality in Bulgaria

Coordinates: 42.4934°N 27.4725°E

Burgas Municipality Община Бургас
- Municipality (Obshtina)
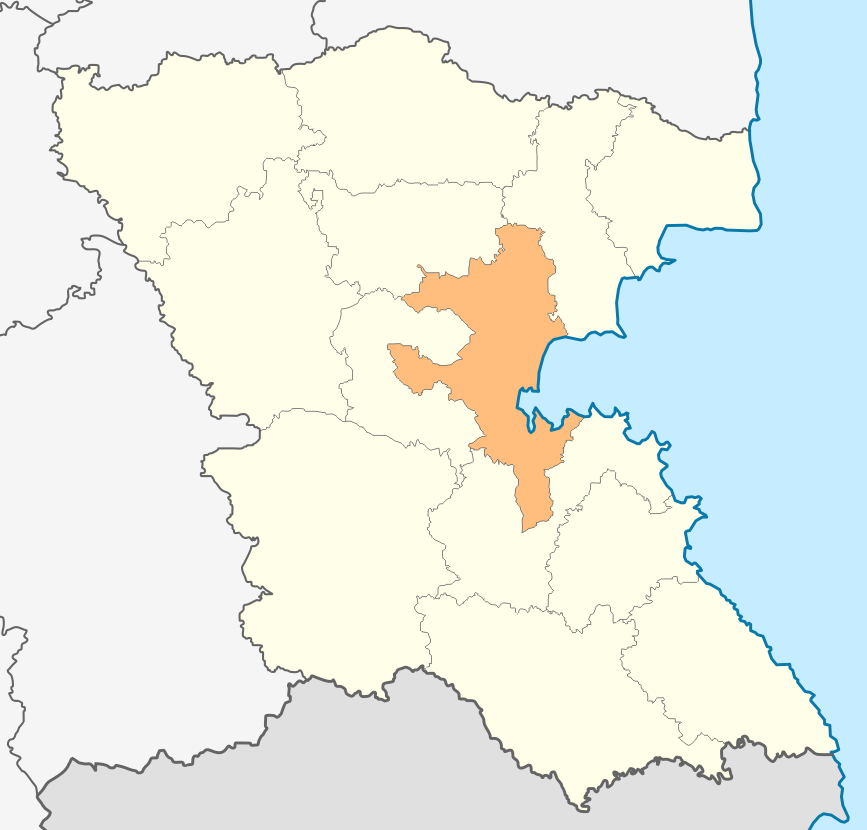
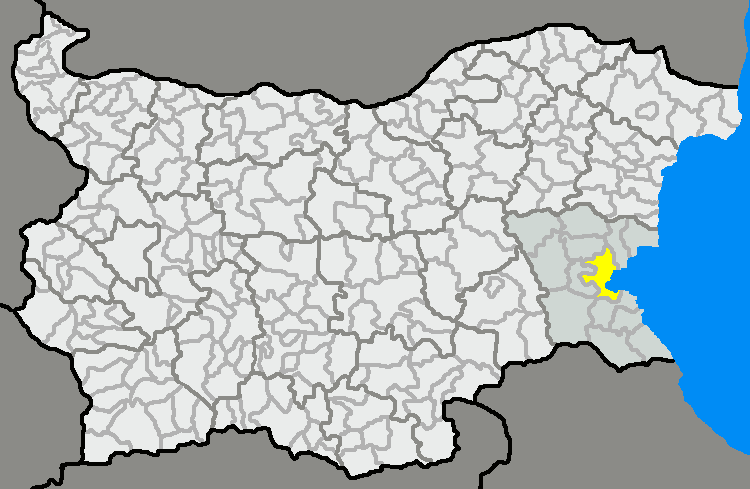
- Location in Burgas province Location on map of Bulgaria
- Country: Bulgaria
- Province (Oblast): Burgas
- Seat: Burgas

Area
  - Total: 488.61 km^{2} (188.65 sq mi)

Population (2011)
  - Total: 232,311
  - Density: 475.45/km^{2} (1,231.4/sq mi)
- Time zone: UTC+2 (EET)
  - Summer (DST): UTC+3 (EEST)
- Website: www.burgas.bg

Burgas Municipality (Bulgarian: Община Бургас, Obshtina Burgas) is the most populated municipality in Burgas Province. It includes Burgas, the town of Balgarovo and 12 villages. After a referendum in 2011 Izvor became part of Burgas Municipality.

== Demographics ==
=== Religion ===
According to the latest Bulgarian census of 2011, the religious composition, among those who answered the optional question on religious identification, was the following:

Religious composition of Burgas Municipality
Orthodox Christianity	85.8%
Catholicism	0.4%
Protestantism	1.1%
Islam	2.2%
No religion	4.6%
Prefer not to answer, others and indefinable	5.9%
