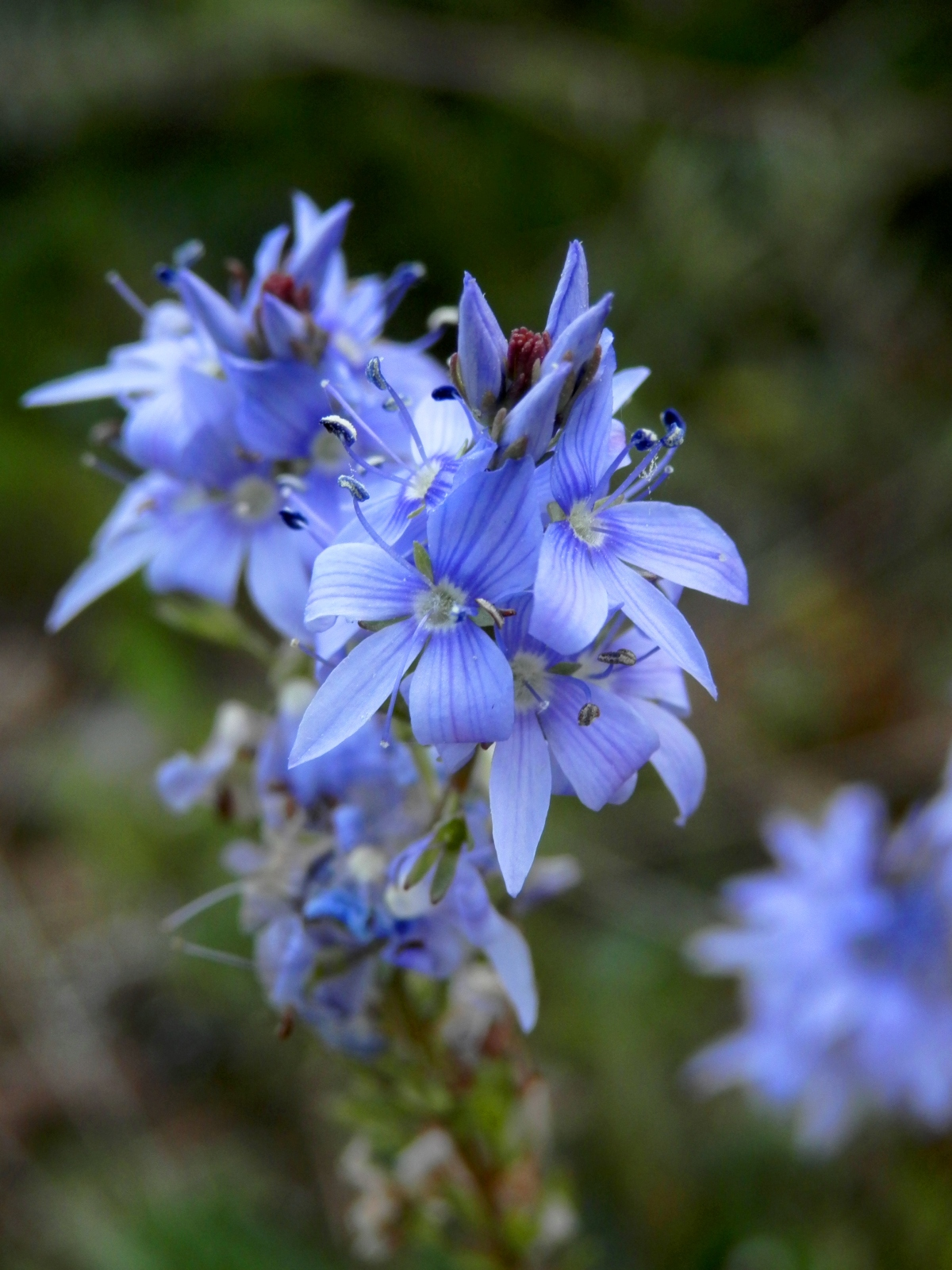

Conservation status
- Data Deficient (IUCN 3.1)

Scientific classification
- Kingdom: Plantae
- Clade: Embryophytes
- Clade: Tracheophytes
- Clade: Spermatophytes
- Clade: Angiosperms
- Clade: Eudicots
- Clade: Asterids
- Order: Lamiales
- Family: Plantaginaceae
- Genus: Veronica
- Species: V. turrilliana

Binomial name
- Veronica turrilliana Stoj. & Stef.

= Veronica turrilliana =

Species of flowering plant

Veronica turrilliana (Bulgarian: Търилово великденче) is a species of speedwell in the family Plantaginaceae, endemic to the Strandzha mountain range in south-eastern Bulgaria and north-western Turkey. It is included in the Red Book of Bulgaria as an endangered species. and is categorized as data deficient by the International Union for Conservation of Nature (IUCN). It was described in 1923 by the Bulgarian botanists Nikolai Stojanov and Boris Stefanoff.

== Morphology ==
Veronica turrilliana has a vertical rhizome, the stems are straight, branched, reaching height of 8 to 35 cm (3.1 to 13.8 in). The leaves are consecutive, skeletal, ovate, elliptic to lanceolate, with small glands. The flowers are in loose grape-shaped raceme; the petals are purple-blue, with a light yellow ring in the middle. The bracts are whole, lanceolate and uncovered. The fruit is an oval, slightly biconvex box. Flowering is in April–May. It is an insect-pollinating plant and propagates by seeds.

== Distribution ==
The plant grows on dry limestone rocks and cracks in the Strandzha mountain range in the south-eastern part of the Balkan Peninsula in Bulgaria and Turkey, at an altitude of about 200 m (660 ft). It forms fragmented populations made up of a few scattered individuals. Its type locality north of the town of Malko Tarnovo, where the species is described, is destroyed. In Bulgaria Veronica turrilliana is spread in Strandzha Nature Park, where it inhabits the Kovach locality south of the village of Zvezdets, Petrova Niva historic area, the zone around the villages of Stoilovo and Slivarovo, the springs of the Mladezhka river, a tributary of the Veleka, as well as Sredoka and Vitanovo Reserves.
