= Strandzha Nature Park =

Nature park in Bulgaria

- IUCN category V (protected landscape/seascape)
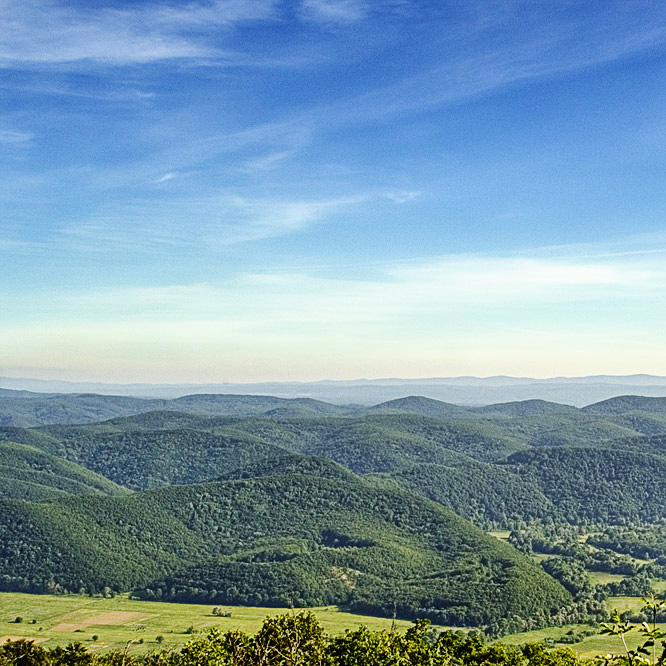
- View from Papiya Peak

- Location within Bulgaria
- Location: Strandzha Mountain, Burgas Province, Bulgaria
- Nearest city: Malko Tarnovo, Ahtopol
- Coordinates: 42°0′45″N 27°36′31″E
- Area: 1,161 square kilometres (448 mi^{2})
- Established: 1995
- Governing body: Ministry of Environment and Water

Strandzha Nature Park (Bulgarian: Природен парк Странджа Priroden park Strandzha, also transliterated as Stranja Nature Park) is the largest protected area in Bulgaria spanning a territory of 1,161 square kilometres (448 mi^{2}) in the Strandzha Mountain in the extreme south-eastern corner of the country on the border with Turkey. It was established on 25 January 1995 to protect ecosystems and biodiversity of European importance, as well as the traditional cultural, historical and folklore heritage of the region. The altitude varies from 710 metres (780 yd) on Gradishte Peak to 0 metres (0 yd) at the Black Sea coast with average length of 50 kilometres (31 mi) from west to east and 20 kilometres (12 mi) from north to south.

The nature park is situated in Burgas Province with two towns, Malko Tarnovo and Ahtopol, and several villages within its territory. It includes five nature reserves: Silkosiya, Sredoka, Tisovitsa, Uzunbodzhak and Vitanovo. Silkosiya is the oldest one in Bulgaria, established in 1933, and Uzunbodzhak is included in the World Network of Biosphere Reserves under the UNESCO Man and Biosphere Programme. The whole territory is part of the network of nature protection areas of the European Union, Natura 2000.

Strandzha Nature Park falls within two terrestrial ecoregions of the Palearctic temperate broadleaf and mixed forest — the Balkan mixed forests and the Euxine-Colchic deciduous forests. Forests cover 80% of the park's area, with old-growth forest forming 30% of them. These woods are the last remaining temperate forests with evergreen laurel undergrowth in Europe. The park has the highest number of vertebrate species of all protected areas in Bulgaria, including 66 species of mammals, 269 species of birds, 24 species of reptiles, 10 species of amphibia and 41 species of freshwater fish, as well as 70 species of marine fish in the waters of the Black Sea. The invertebrate fauna is poorly researched and includes 84 Bulgarian endemic species, of which 4 are local, and 34 relict species.

The oldest traces of human habitation found in the territory of the park date from the Neolithic period in c. 6000 BC. By the mid-1st millennium BC Strandzha was inhabited by Thracian tribes, forming part of several Thracian kingdoms until the region was annexed by the Roman Empire in 45 AD. In the Middle Ages the area was contested between the Byzantine and the Bulgarian Empires until it was conquered by the Ottoman Turks in the late 14th century. After the Liberation of Bulgaria in 1878, Strandzha remained in the Ottoman Empire, which resulted in the 1903 Ilinden–Preobrazhenie Uprising by the local Bulgarian population. The region was liberated in 1912 during the First Balkan War. The rich history has left an important cultural heritage by several civilizations and folklore traditions unique for Bulgaria, such as Nestinarstvo that involves a barefoot dance on smouldering embers — a vestige from the pagan past. Traditional Strandzha wooden architecture from the mid-17th to the 19th century is preserved in the villages of Brashlyan and Kosti, as well as in the town of Malko Tarnovo.

== Park administration ==
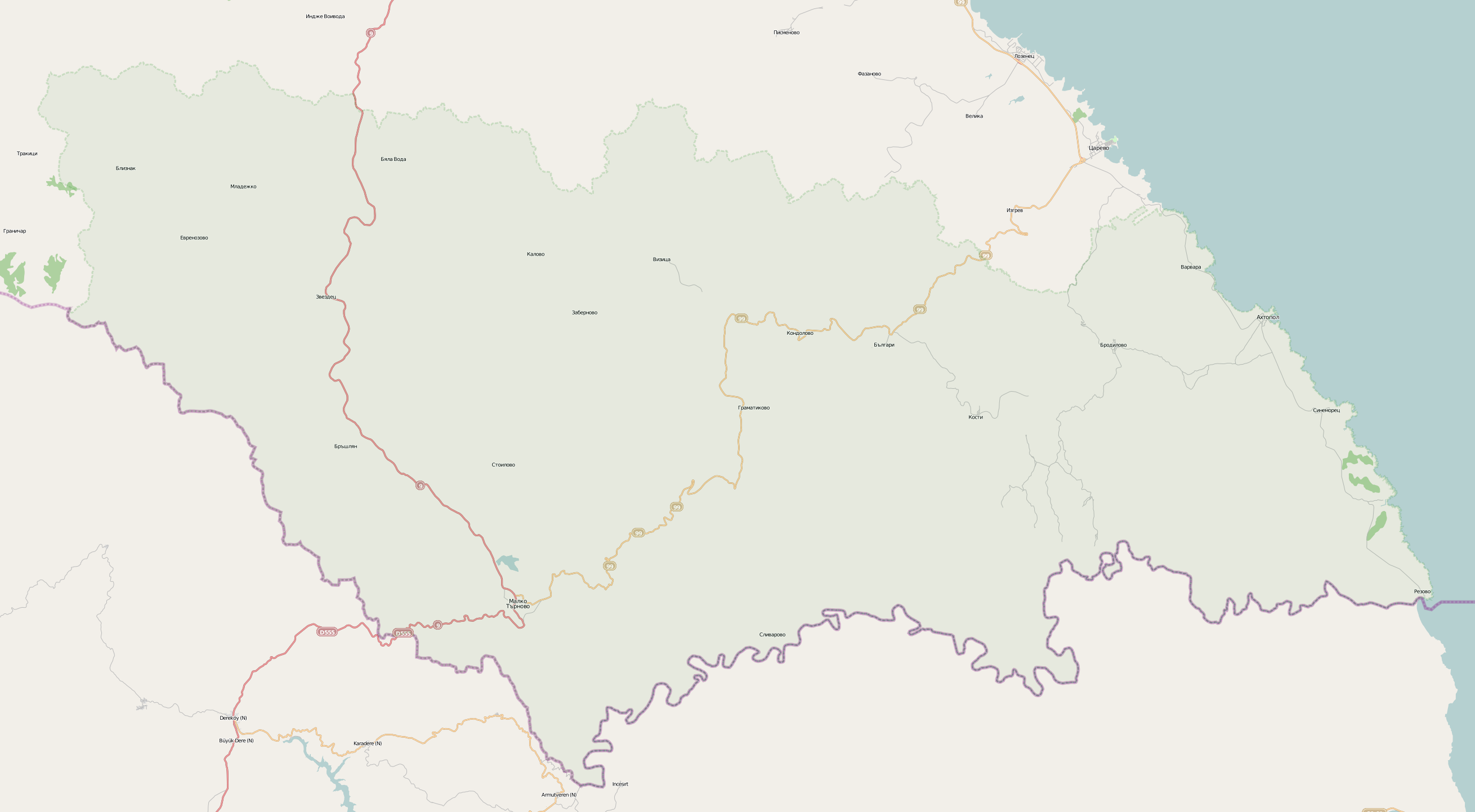
A map of Strandzha nature park

Strandzha Nature Park was established on 25 January 1995 to protect ecosystems and biodiversity, as well as the traditional cultural, historical and folklore heritage of the region. Before 1995 the protection of the region had been fragmented, consisting of isolated nature reserves and protected areas. The park is administered by a directorate based in Malko Tarnovo and subordinated to the Executive Forest Agency of the Ministry of Environment and Water of Bulgaria. The directorate implements the state policy for the management and control of the protected area, aiming at the long-term conservation of the unique nature and ensuring the sustainable social and economic development of the region. It monitors the management and conservation of the forests, game, and fish resources while encouraging tourism and environmental protection.

The park falls within the International Union for Conservation of Nature management category V (protected landscape/seascape). The whole territory of the park and the adjacent Black Sea waters are included in the European Union network of nature protection areas Natura 2000 under the code Strandzha BG0001007. Strandzha Nature Park is listed as an important bird and biodiversity area by BirdLife International. There are two information centres for visitors: in Malko Tarnovo and in Gramatikovo.

== Geography ==
=== Overview ===
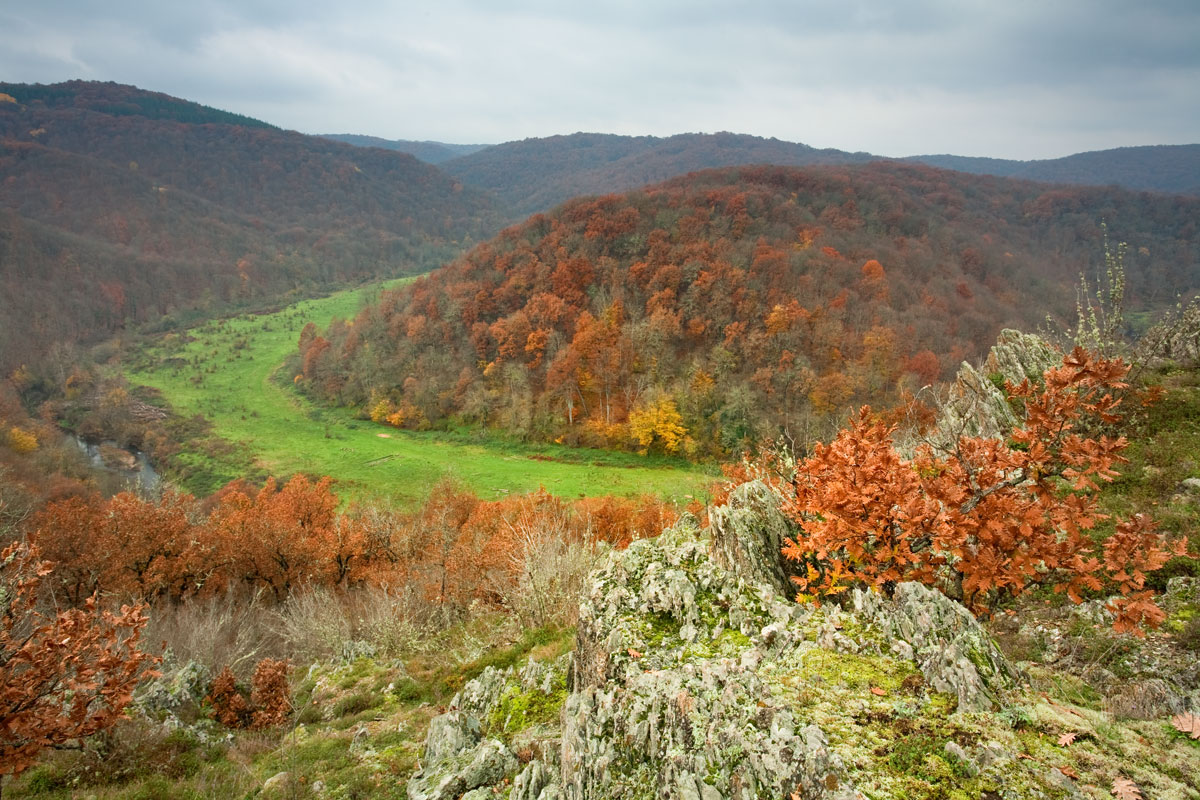
Autumn view of a forest along the meanders of the Veleka river

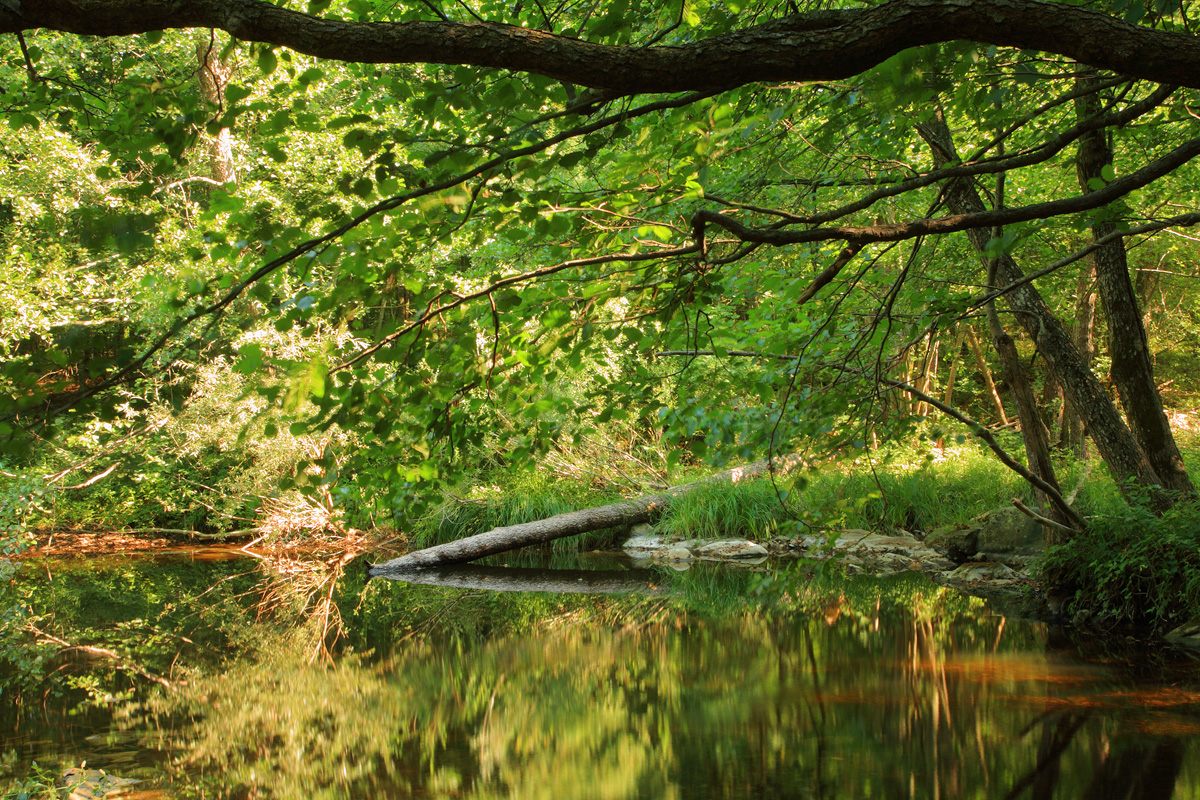
A forest in Tisovitsa Reserve

Strandzha Nature Park is situated entirely in Burgas Province within the territory of two municipalities, Malko Tarnovo and Tsarevo, in the extreme south-eastern corner of Bulgaria. This area includes the 7,000 inhabitants of 19 villages, and the towns of Malko Tarnovo and Ahtopol. Strandzha is the least populated region in Bulgaria with a population density of 10 people per km^{2}. It is accessible through the I-9 first class road to the west and the III-9901 third class road to the east which serves the park coastline. The two roads are linked by the II-99 second class road. With an area of 1,161 square kilometres (448 mi^{2}), or approximately 1% of the national territory, the park is the largest protected territory in Bulgaria. Due to the geographic location of Strandzha in the immediate vicinity of Asia, the park contains biodiversity of European importance as well as a unique historical heritage.

The vegetation of Strandzha evolved before the formation of the Bosphorus Strait when the whole southern Black Sea coast was linked and represents the westernmost extension of the Euxine-Colchic ecoregion. Because of the proximity of three seas, the Black Sea, the Marmara Sea and the Aegean Sea, Strandzha remained unaffected by the Quaternary glaciation and retained its mild and relatively humid climate. Under those conditions the region has preserved relict species from the Neogene.

=== Relief, geology and soils ===
The relief of Strandzha is hilly, characterised by mild rolling ridges covered with dense woods. To the west the mountain is steeper and more rugged. Strandzha Nature Park has two clearly defined ridges — Rezovo ridge with its highest summit at Golyamo Gradishte peak at 710 metres (780 yd) and Bosna ridge with Papia at 502 metres (549 yd)) forming the highest elevation. Approximately 38% of the park's territory has an altitude from 0–20 metres (0–66 ft), 60% from 20–60 metres (66–197 ft), and only 2% lies above 60 metres (66 yd). The mountain is an anticline with core layers formed by igneous and metamorphic rocks with Paleozoic origin and surface strata covered with Mesozoic sediments dating from the Triassic, Jurassic and Cretaceous periods. The anticline has an orientation from north-west to south-east. The river valleys are geologically young, formed during the Quaternary, and have gentle slopes and a slight inclination. In the western regions there is an extensive karst area with carbonate rocks spanning from the village of Varovnik to the town of Malko Tarnovo with ponors, caverns and caves.

The territory of Strandzha Nature Park falls within the Mediterranean soil area of Europe, characterised by wetter soils in comparison to the rest of Southern Europe. There are seven soil types in the park under the World Reference Base for Soil Resources soil classification — Fluvisols (4% of the park's area), Leptosols (10%), Cambisols (4%), Luvisols (46%), Planosols (20%), Alisols (11%) and Nitisols (5%). Strandzha is the only place in Bulgaria where Alisoils are found and the only place in Europe with Nitisols.

=== Climate ===
The climate of Strandzha is influenced by the proximity of the Black, Marmara and Aegean seas which clearly distinguishes the local climate from that of the rest of Bulgaria. The region is among the warmest in the country with temperatures rarely falling below 0 °C in winter and rising above 24 °C in summer due to the cooling effect of the Black Sea. The average temperature drops with the rising elevation in the interior which creates conditions for more frequent and longer-lasting mists, heavier snowfall and earlier frosts. In winter frequent fogs lead to hard rime and the icing of the forests at altitudes above 500 metres (0 yd).

Climate data for Malko Tarnovo
Month	Jan	Feb	Mar	Apr	May	Jun	Jul	Aug	Sep	Oct	Nov	Dec	Year
Mean daily maximum °C (°F)	5.1 (41.2)	6.7 (44.1)	8.1 (46.6)	15.6 (60.1)	20.8 (69.4)	24.6 (76.3)	27.1 (80.8)	27.9 (82.2)	23.5 (74.3)	17.9 (64.2)	12.9 (55.2)	7.9 (46.2)	16.6 (61.9)
Daily mean °C (°F)	1.4 (34.5)	2.8 (37.0)	4.5 (40.1)	10.0 (50.0)	14.9 (58.8)	18.6 (65.5)	20.6 (69.1)	20.7 (69.3)	16.6 (61.9)	12.2 (54.0)	8.5 (47.3)	4.5 (40.1)	11.3 (52.3)
Mean daily minimum °C (°F)	−2.1 (28.2)	−0.7 (30.7)	0.7 (33.3)	5.2 (41.4)	9.6 (49.3)	12.5 (54.5)	13.6 (56.5)	14.2 (57.6)	11.0 (51.8)	7.9 (46.2)	5.1 (41.2)	1.1 (34.0)	6.5 (43.7)
Average precipitation mm (inches)	120 (4.7)	91 (3.6)	74 (2.9)	65 (2.6)	64 (2.5)	64 (2.5)	40 (1.6)	34 (1.3)	62 (2.4)	102 (4.0)	121 (4.8)	131 (5.2)	968 (38.1)
Source: Climate guide of Bulgaria (temperature 1931–1970; precipitation 1931–1985)

The winds are predominantly northern. Along the coastline the winds flow from the north in November – March, from the east in April – August and from the north-east in September – October. The sea breeze causes the high frequency of eastern winds in summer. In the interior the predominant wind direction is more varied with northern winds being the most frequent in January – March and in October.

The annual precipitation is high, reaching in some areas above 1,000 millimetres (39 in). Along the coast rainfall is under the influence of the Mediterranean and is characterised with a winter maximum while the higher regions of Strandzha also have a second maximum in May – June as a result of the continental climate. In the interior rainfall is higher and influenced by the cold northern and north-eastern winds. There is no natural protection to the north which often results in abrupt temperature falls.

Strandzha has a significant potential for climate therapy. Due to the healthy climate along the coastline combined with sandy beaches, Ahtopol was designated a climatic sea resort of national importance and Sinemorets a climatic sea resort of local importance.

=== Rivers ===
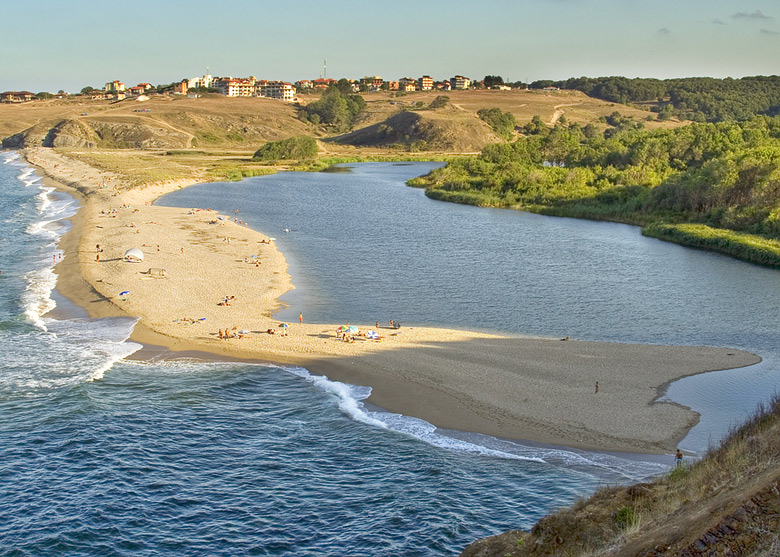
The mouth of the Veleka river at Sinemorets

Strandzha is criss-crossed by a dense network of deep ravines, streams and rivers. The rivers have a discharge maximum in winter, in November – December. With a total length of 147 kilometres (91 mi), the Veleka river is the longest and largest in Strandzha. Its upper course has a rocky bottom and many rapids. As the river flows through the karstic region of the mountain, its banks are steep with cliffs and precipices. After the village of Zvezdets, the river valley grows wider, the inclination decreases, the water flow slows and the river creates many meanders. In the lower course the river banks are flooded seasonally forming a wetland forest of alluvial longose groves. The Veleka is navigable in the first 8 kilometres (5.0 mi) up from the river mouth.

The second longest river is the Rezovo river, at 112 kilometres (70 mi). It generally flows east and along most of its course forms the border between Bulgaria and Turkey. According to a hypothesis its etymology is linked to the mythological king Rhesus of Thrace. The banks of the river are covered with dense oak and beech forests. The Bulgarian bank is characterised with many cliff formations and caves. The Rezovo river is faster and colder than the Veleka and therefore has a larger trout population. The tributaries of the Veleka include the Mladezhka reka (40 kilometres (25 mi)), Mechi Dol (26 kilometres (16 mi)), Katun (15 kilometres (9.3 mi)), and the main tributary of the Rezovo river is the Delievska river (17 kilometres (11 mi)).

== Protected areas ==
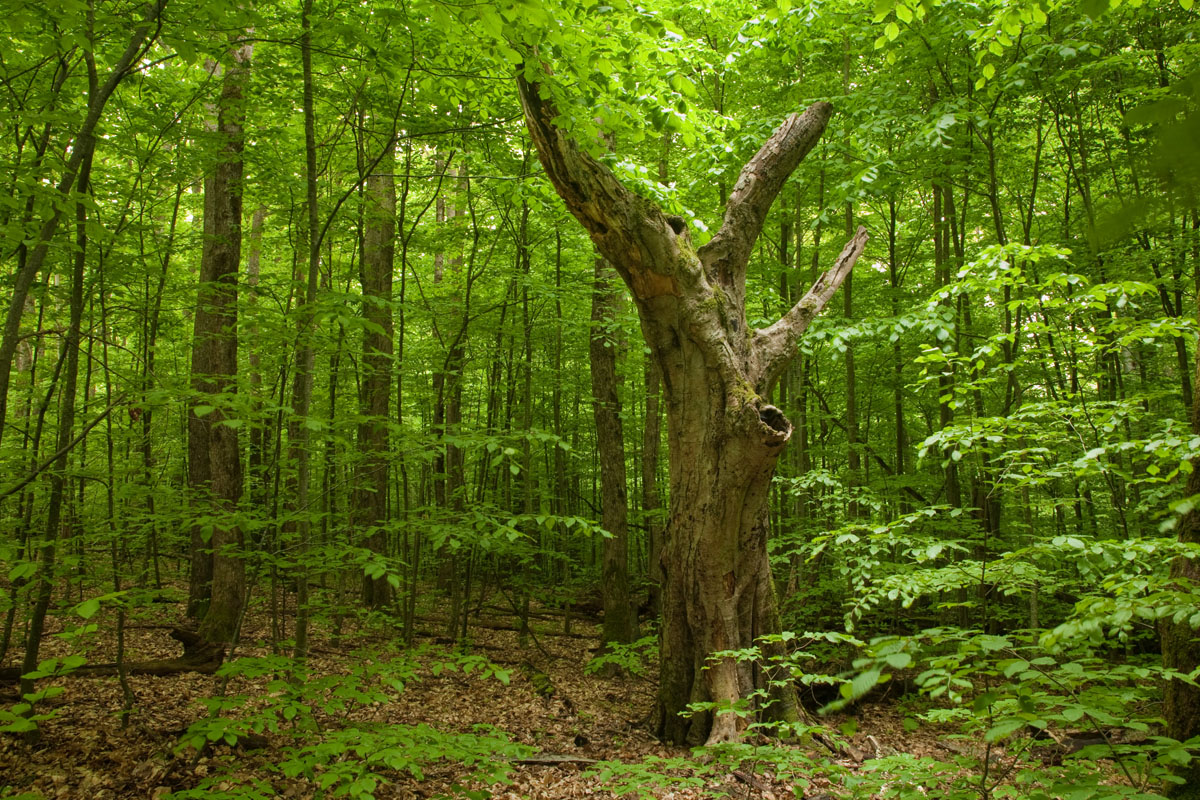
A forest in Uzunbodzhak Reserve

Strandzha Nature Park includes five nature reserves (Silkosiya, Sredoka, Tisovitsa, Uzunbodzhak and Vitanovo), eight natural landmarks, and 14 protected areas. (Note: included in the nature park: protected areas, natural landmarks) Silkosiya is the first nature reserve in Bulgaria, established in 1933. It is situated 2 kilometres (1.2 mi) to the north of Kosti and 1 kilometre (0.62 mi) to the east of Balgari. It hosts 260 species of vascular plants and forests with average tree age of 120–130 years. Srednoka is situated in the lower course of the Mechi Dol river and is the only reserve in Strandzha with many meadows and open spaces. Tisovitsa is located in an area with a difficult access along the banks of the homonymous river and features archaeological sites from ancient Thrace. Uzunbodzhak is included in the World Network of Biosphere Reserves under the UNESCO Man and Biosphere Programme and is situated along the border with Turkey. Vitanovo is located on the main Rezovo ridge 9 kilometres (5.6 mi) from Malko Tarnovo and 5 kilometres (3.1 mi) from Brashlyan. Its altitude varies from 400 to 600 metres (0 yd), making vegetation different from that in the other reserves. Access to the reserves is restricted to research teams, with a few strictly defined tourist trails. Among the most significant protected areas are the Mouth of the Veleka river and Silistar. Silistar is situated on the Black Sea coast between the villages of Sinemorets and Rezovo and has the highest number of plant species per square kilometre in Bulgaria.

== Biology ==
=== Flora ===
In terms of biogeography the park falls within both the Balkan mixed forests, and the Euxine-Colchic deciduous forests terrestrial ecoregions of the Palearctic temperate broadleaf and mixed forest. The combination of climate, specific geographic position and relief, as well as the lack of a strong anthropogenic influence, have contributed to the formation of 130 different habitats, making Strandzha Nature Park first in that indicator among all protected areas in Europe. There are 1670 species of vascular plants which constitute 44% of the total number of species in Bulgaria.

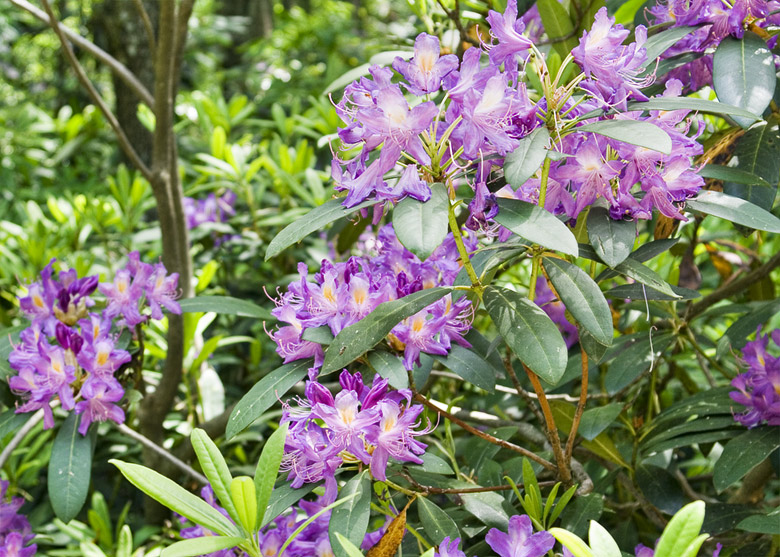
Pontic rhododendron, the symbol of Strandzha nature park

The vegetation of the park includes many communities of a Mediterranean and sub-Mediterranean type: warm oak forests with undergrowth of evergreen sclerophyll shrubs, such as tree heath (Erica arborea), butcher's-broom (Ruscus aculeatus), Rose of Sharon (Hypericum calycinum), green olive tree (Phillyrea latifolia), Cistus incanus, sage-leaved rock rose (Cistus salvifolius), among others. The xerothermic grasslands along the coast and in some areas to the west of the park have replaced forests destroyed by human activity. The most widespread floral communities of that type are dominated by Chrysopogon gryllus, Bothriochloa ischaemum and bulbous bluegrass (Poa bulbosa). The coastal dunes are home to psammophytic vegetation. The river banks are covered with dense forests of black alder (Alnus glutinosa), white willow (Salix alba) and crack willow (Salix fragilis).

Deciduous forests cover 80% of the park's area and belong to 28 forest and 18 bush habitats. This variety is due to the lower river valleys, the sea coast and the karstic terrain. These include forests of oriental beech (Fagus orientalis), sessile oak (Quercus petraea), Strandzhan oak (Quercus hartwissiana), Hungarian oak (Quercus frainetto), common hornbeam (Carpinus betulus), oriental hornbeam (Carpinus orientalis) and small-leaved lime (Tilia cordata) with undergrowth of pontic rhododendron (Rhododendron ponticum), Caucasian whortleberry (Vaccinium arctostaphylos), cherry laurel (Prunus laurocerasus), Black Sea holly (Ilex colchica), Himalayan meadow primrose (Primula rosea) and common heather (Calluna).

There are 64 relict plant species, 6 of which cannot be found elsewhere in the European Union — Strandzhan oak, Caucasian whortleberry, Colchic holly, twin-flowered daphne (Daphne pontica), tutsan (Hypericum androsaemum) and H. calycinum. The Pontic rhododendron is the symbol of the park and an important relict species with a highly disjunct areal in Europe where it inhabits only the north-western Iberian Peninsula and Strandzha. There are 56 endemic plant species, including local endemics (Veronica turrilliana and Anthemis jordanovii), western Black Sea coast endemics (Silene caliacrae and Lepidotrichum uechtrizianum), 6 Bulgarian endemics (Pyrus bulgarica, Oenanthe millefolia, Galium bulgaricum, Veronica krumovii, among others) and 40 Balkan endemics, such as Saponaria stranjensis. 113 species are listed in the Red Book of Bulgaria, including several species that within Bulgaria can only be found in the park — Ophrys reinholdii, Verbascum bugulifolium, Sideritis syriaca, Cistus laurifolius, among others.

=== Fauna ===
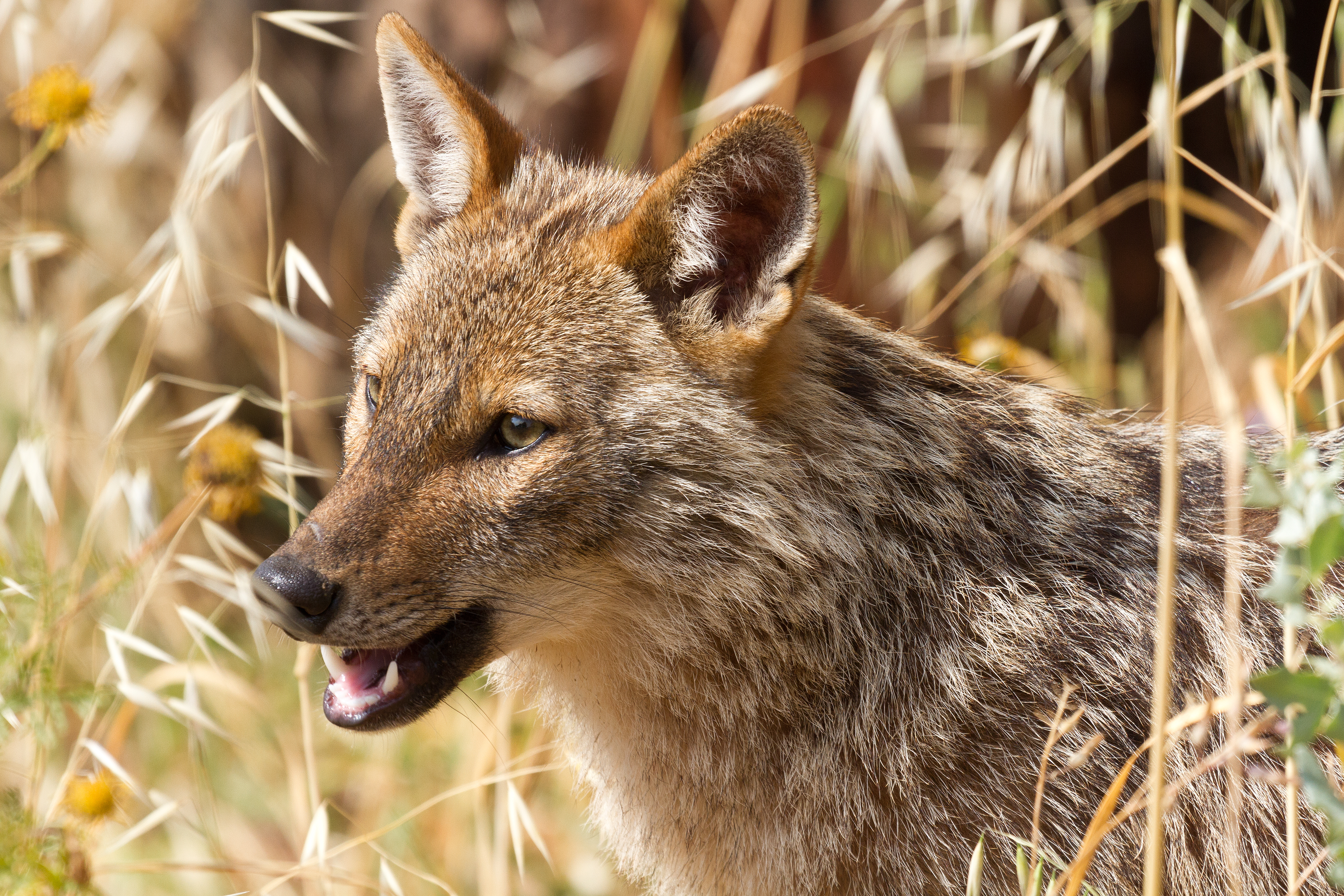
The golden jackal is among the most common representatives of the Carnivora order in Strandzha nature park

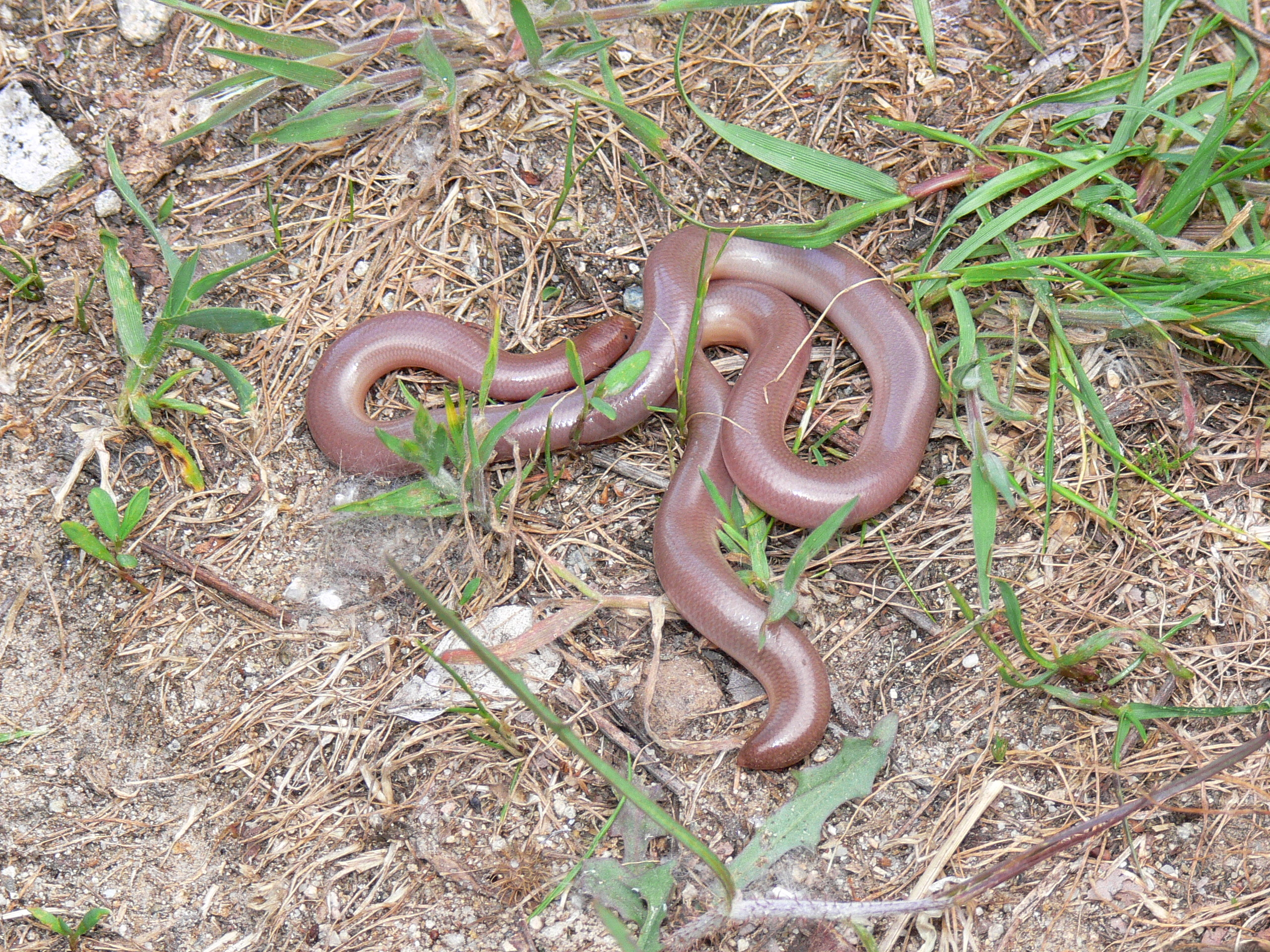
The European blind snake is the only worm snake in Europe and is restricted to the southern parts of the Balkan Peninsula

Strandzha Nature Park has the richest vertebrate fauna among all protected areas in Bulgaria — 410 species, not counting 70 species of marine fishes. There are 66 breeding mammal species. Among the most common are the roe deer, red deer, wild boar, grey wolf, golden jackal, red fox, European badger, and beech marten. The park protects some of the largest and most important populations of European otter and wildcat in Europe. The European pine marten and marbled polecat are uncommon in Strandzha. There are 25 bat species present including Bechstein's bat and Kuhl's pipistrelle. 27 species of small mammals at the park include European ground squirrel, lesser mole-rat, Günther's vole, three dormouse species, and two other globally threatened species. The park is an important sanctuary of the Roach's mouse-tailed dormouse. There have been reports on the presence of Mediterranean monk seals in the rocks and caverns of Silistar.

Strandzha is situated on Via Pontica, the second-largest bird migratory route in Europe. The bays and estuaries along the Black Sea coast are a wintering destination for some birds. There are 269 avian species in the park, including populations of global importance of white-backed woodpecker, semi-collared flycatcher, olive-tree warbler and sombre tit, as well as populations of European importance of Egyptian vulture, white stork, black stork, Eurasian eagle owl and four eagle species.

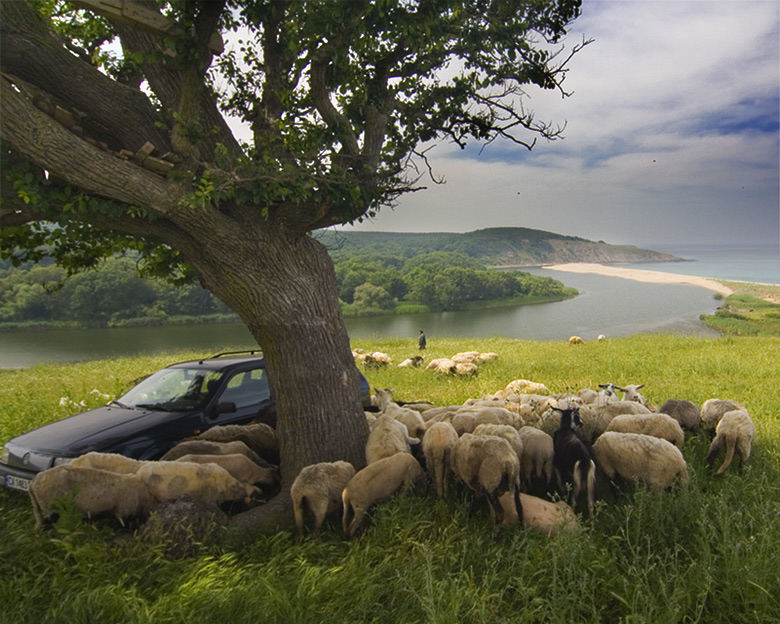
A landscape of Strandzha nature park

There are 24 species of reptiles, 11 of which have a population of global significance. They include red whip snake, Aesculapian snake, European blind snake, sheltopusik (Europe's largest lizard), Kotschy's gecko, European pond turtle, Balkan pond turtle, spur-thighed tortoise, Hermann's tortoise, etc. The sand lizard, which is typical for western Bulgaria but very uncommon to the east, is also present in the park. Ten amphibian species have been recorded, such as European tree frog, eastern spadefoot and southern crested newt. The absence of common reptiles and amphibians, such as fire salamander, common spadefoot and common European viper, is noteworthy.

The ichthyofauna of the park is among the richest in Europe with 41 freshwater and brackish water species of fish, as well as 70 marine fish species. There are nine Ponto-Caspian and five boreal relict species. The Ponto-Caspian dates from the ancient Sarmatian Sea. The boreal dates from the epoch of Quaternary cooling. The Black Sea bleak and the Bulgarian minnow are endemic species that can only be found in the Veleka and Rezovska drainages. There are several species restricted to the Black Sea basin (vyrezub, mushroom goby, bighead goby, toad goby, tubenose goby, western tubenose goby and racer goby). The round goby and estuarine perch are found in the Caspian and Black Sea basins.

The invertebrate fauna is poorly studied. There are 80 Bulgarian and 4 local endemics, as well as 34 relict species.

== Cultural heritage ==
=== History ===
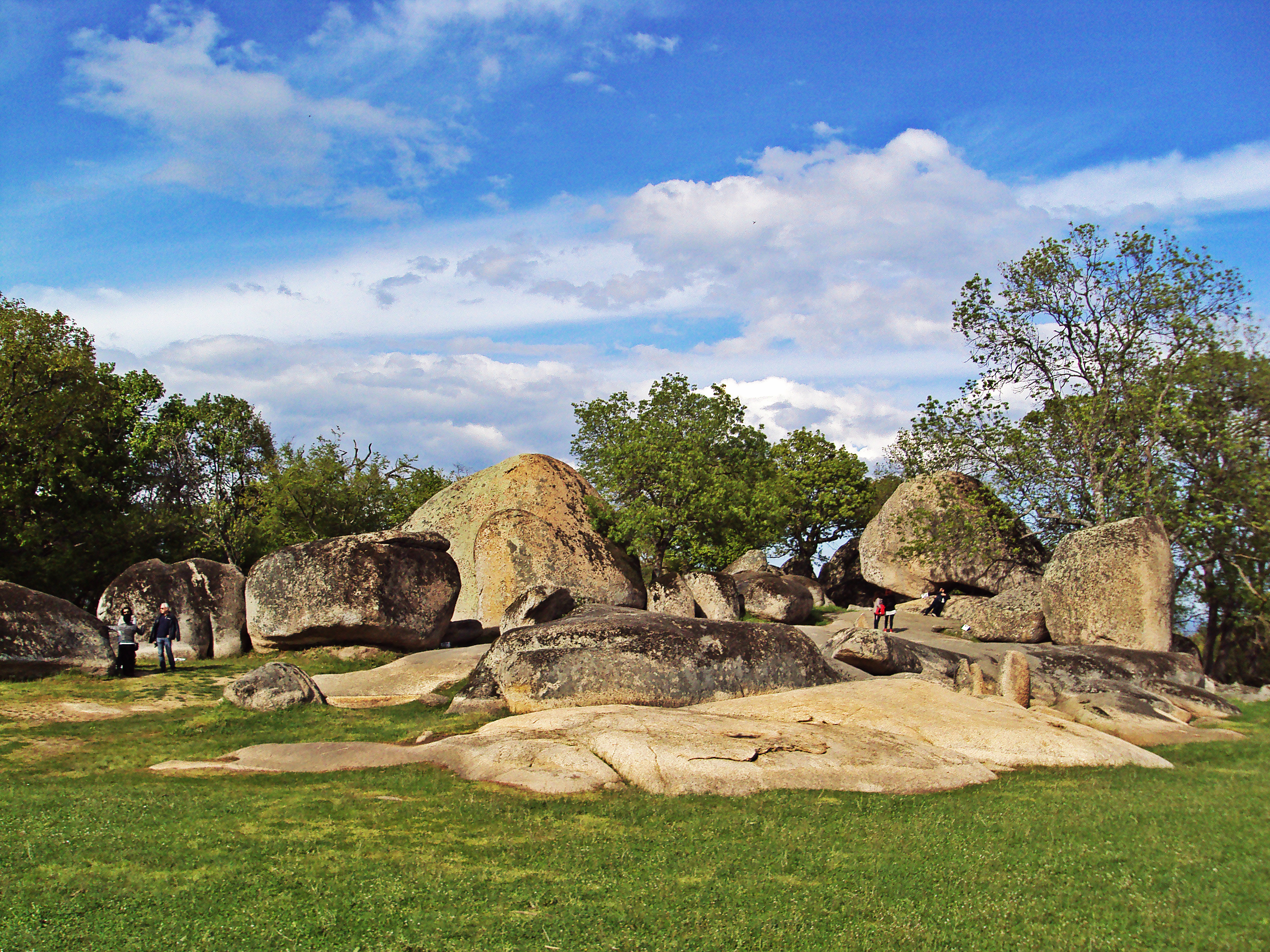
A view of the Thracian rock sanctuary of Beglik Tash, situated on Maslen nos cape, at several kilometers to the north of the park

The documented history of Strandzha dates back several millennia. The oldest traces of human habitation are stone axes and ceramic fragments found in the Ahtopol peninsula and are dated from the Neolithic period (c. 6000—3000 BC). Since the mid-1st millennium BC the mountain was inhabited by the Thracian tribes Thyni and Asti and was part of the Odrysian kingdom. The Thracians of Strandzha were infamous for their pirate raids. By the 2nd century BC, the power of the Odrysian kingdom declined and it became a client state of the Roman Republic. However, it kept its independence until 46 BC, when it was annexed by the Roman Empire, forming the province of Thracia. The region remained part of the Roman Empire and its successor the Byzantine Empire. In Roman times, Strandzha was a centre of copper and iron ore mining and metallurgy. In the late 6th and early 7th centuries the Slavs settled in most of the Balkans, including Strandzha. The whole territory of the modern park was included in the Bulgarian Empire for the first time in the aftermath of the Byzantine–Bulgarian war of 894–896. Strandzha remained a contested region between Bulgaria and Byzantium throughout the Middle Ages. In the 14th century, Bulgarian emperor Ivan Alexander (r. 1331–1371) gave refuge to the Hesychastic monk Gregory of Sinai and provided funds for the construction of a monastery near Paroria, in the homonymous protected area in the modern park, which attracted clerics from Bulgaria, Byzantium and Serbia.

The interior of the region fell to the Ottoman Turks shortly after 1369 and the coastal towns were conquered in 1453. Under Ottoman rule, many villages provided auxiliaries to the Ottoman army or had to protect the mountain passes and therefore enjoyed a more favourable status — they paid no taxes and the men had the right to bear arms. There were 17 privileged villages in the territory of the modern park where Muslims were not allowed to settle. During the time of internal disorder in the Ottoman Empire in 1785–1810, brigand bands wreaked havoc in Strandzha resulting in the migration of thousands of people. Another massive migration wave followed the Russo-Turkish War (1828–29) and many Bulgarians settled in the southern areas of the Russian Empire. After the Liberation of Bulgaria in 1878, Strandzha remained outside the borders of the reborn state. In July 1903 in the historic area Petrova Niva the delegates of the Internal Macedonian-Adrianople Revolutionary Organization (IMARO) discussed the outbreak of an anti-Ottoman rebellion. The Ilinden–Preobrazhenie Uprising broke out in Strandzha and Macedonia in August 1903 and lasted for about twenty days before being suppressed by the Turks who committed great atrocities to the local population. Over 60 villages were burned down and thousands were massacred. Strandzha was liberated during the First Balkan War (1912–1913) and formally joined Bulgaria after the Second Balkan War in 1913.

=== Archaeological and architectural heritage ===
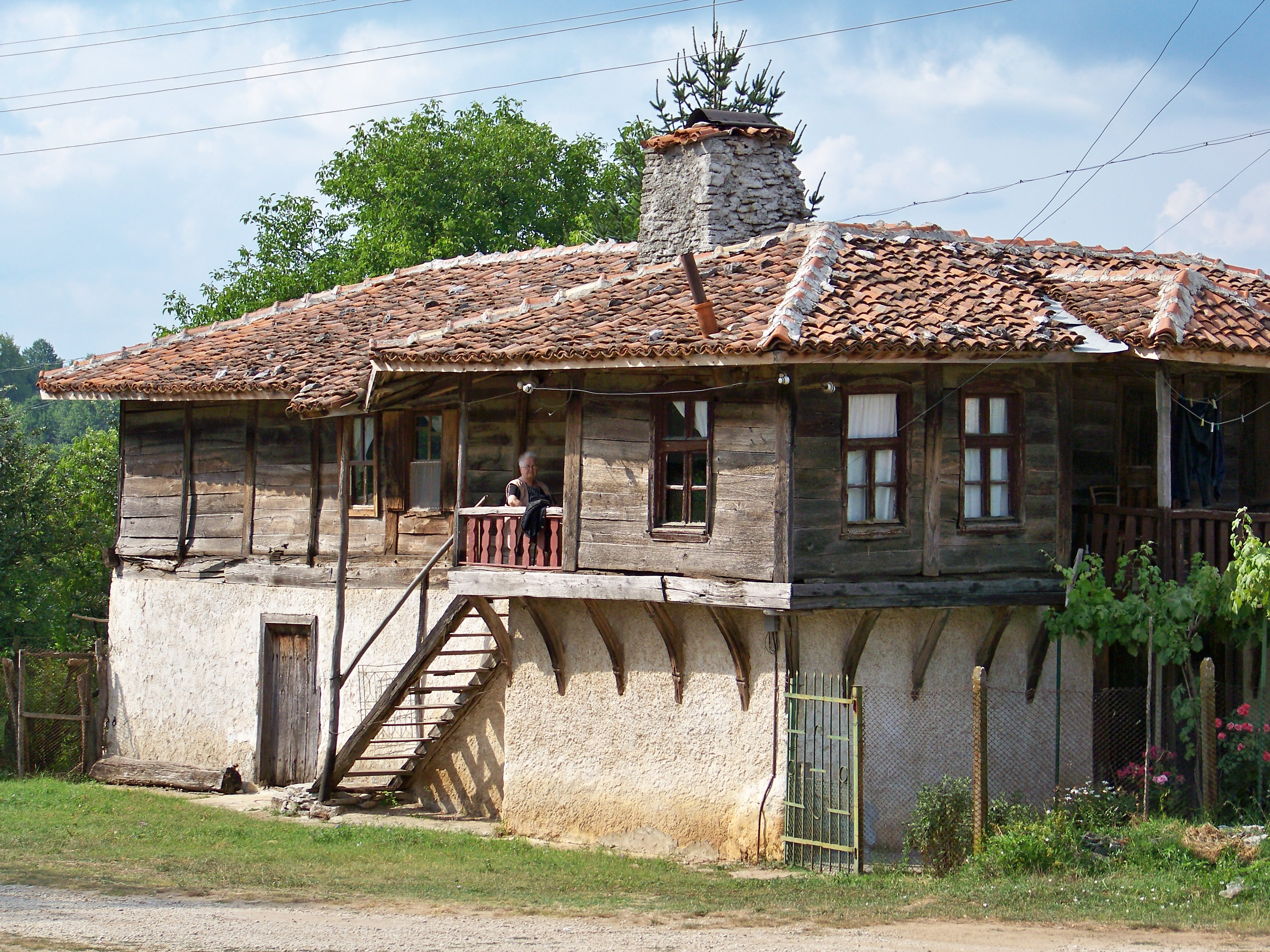
A Strandzhan wooden house in Brashlyan

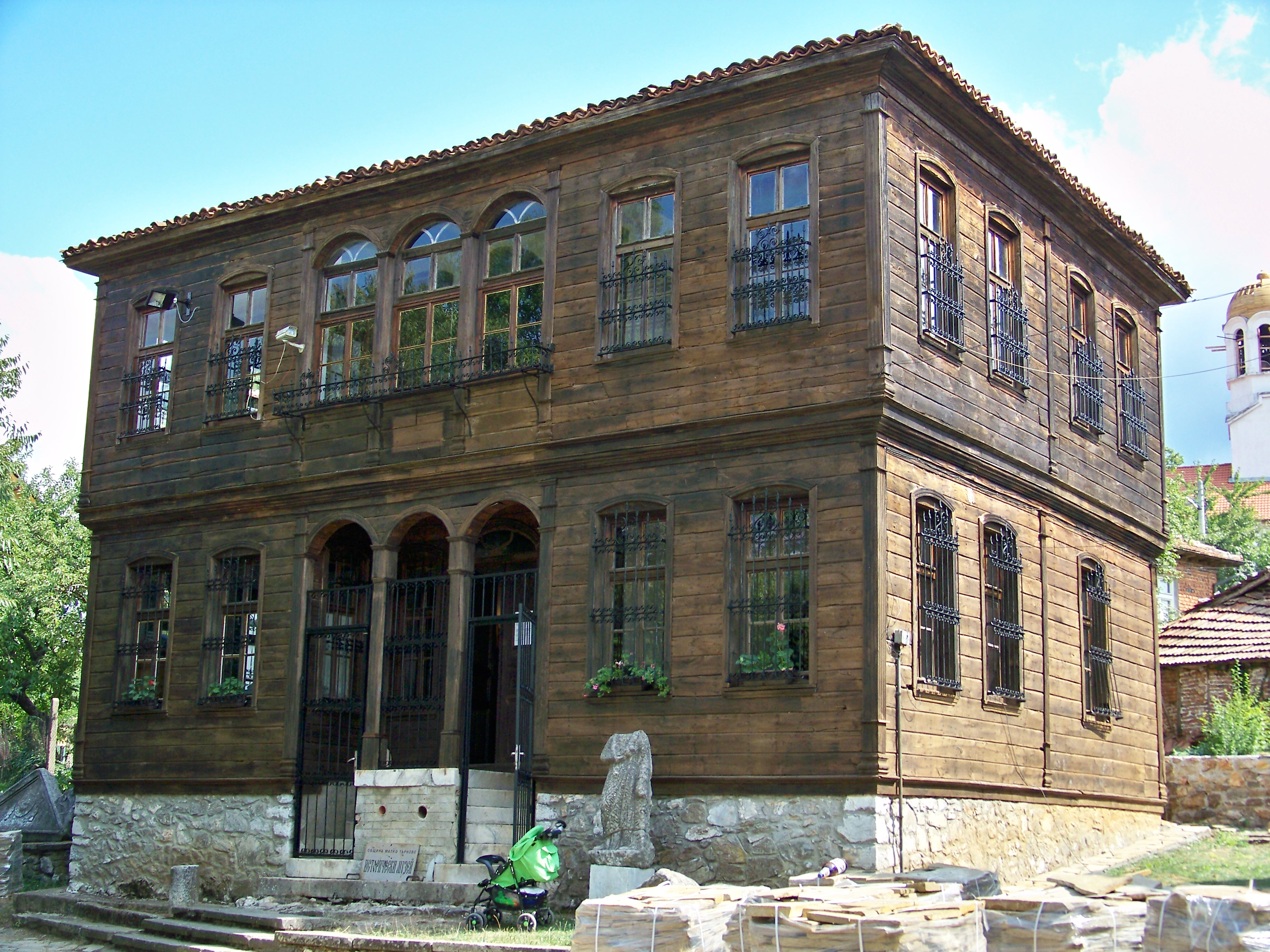
A Strandzhan wooden house in Malko Tarnovo

The rich history of Strandzha has left important vestiges across the territory of the park. The Thracians worshipped a Sun god as early as the Bronze Age and many of their rock sanctuaries and dolmens have been preserved in Strandzha. One of the main characteristics is the presence of megalith structures. Among the most important monuments of that epoch is the Thracian cult complex in Mishkova Niva, one the south-eastern slopes of Golyamo Gradishte peak 3 kilometres (1.9 mi) from Malko Tarnovo. The complex, constructed in honour of a local chief and high priest, included a domed mound, a fortified edifice for the priests, a mould necropolis, a mine and a fortress. The domed mound has a diameter of 25 metres (27 yd), built by three rows and white marble blocks, and has been preserved up to a height of 1.8 metres (2.0 yd). The fortress is situated on Golyamo Gradishte peak, the highest point of the park; its diameter is 100 metres (0 yd) and the walls are 2.5 metres (2.7 yd) thick. In the 5th–3rd century BC it was a dolmen and it was reconstructed as a monumental sanctuary in the 3rd–2nd century BC. The complex had a prominent place in the religious life of the Thracian tribes from all over the mountain.

The Thracian necropolis of Propada, 3 kilometres (1.9 mi) to the north-west of Malko Tarnovo, contains 40 burial mounds on a hill made of marble blocks. Coins discovered during the excavations prove the practice of Charon's obol. The ritual constitutes a coin being placed in or on the mouth of the dead person before burial as a payment for Charon, the ferryman who conveyed souls across the river that divided the world of the living from the world of the dead. The top of the hill is crowned by a small domed tomb with similar construction plan to those of the Thracian tombs of Kazanlak, Aleksandrovo, Mezek, etc. The necropolis was active until the 4th century AD. Another sanctuary of interest is situated in Kamenska Barchina, 10 kilometres (6.2 mi) from Malko Tarnovo. It is located in an area of conglomerate rocks, which are relatively rare in Strandzha. There are many circles carved in the rock, associated with the sun cult and the preparation of sacred wine.

There were around 60 Thracian fortresses in Strandzha, many of which were used in the Middle Ages when churches were constructed in their inner yards. The fortresses were built of large stones without the use of mortar. Vestiges of those stronghold can be found near the villages of Mladezhko, Balgari, Brodilovo, Malko Tarnovo, etc. The ruins of a fortress with church foundations are situated 8 kilometres (5.0 mi) to the south-east of Zvezdets. There are ruins of several small early Byzantine castles along the coast between the rivers Veleka and Rezovska. These were part of the defensive system built by emperor Justinian I (r. 527–565) against Avar and Slavic incursions. On a small cape to the south of Ahtopol are the ruins of the Church of St Yani which used to be part of a larger monastic complex. The only preserved section of the edifice is the apse.

During the Ottoman rule the area was isolated, which influenced the formation of a local style of rural architecture. The Strandzhan wooden houses evolved in the 17th and 18th centuries. They have a stone foundation and first floor and a wooden second storey. The walls, floors and ceilings are constructed from oak timber. The houses often follow an elongated plan — all rooms are arranged one after another. An important architectural element is the fireplace, built in stone, up to 2 metres (2.2 yd) wide in its foundations and 1 metre (1.1 yd) deep. It narrows in height and takes the shape of a truncated pyramid. Examples of Strandzhan houses have been preserved in Malko Tarnovo, Brashlyan and Kosti.

=== Ethnography and folklore ===
Historically the region has been a centre of Bulgarian culture. Strandzha is inhabited by three ethnographic groups — the Ruptsi, Tronki and Zagortsi. The Strandzhan or Eastern Ruptsi (called this way to distinguish them from the Rhodopean Ruptsi) are considered the largest of the three groups. The etymology of the name is linked to the word ropa or rupa, which means a "mine shaft" in the local dialects. They have preserved some vestiges of the pagan religious traditions and rites of the Antiquity. They speak the Strandzha dialect which is part of the Rup dialects and has preserved many words from the Old Bulgarian language. The traditional Ruptsi settlements in the park are Balgari, Brashlyan, Byala Voda, Gramatikovo, Kalovo, Kondolovo, Malko Tarnovo, Rezovo, Slivarovo, Stoilovo, Vizitsa, Zabernovo and Zvezdets. After 1913 the Ruptsi who inhabited the territory of modern Turkey settled in the north-western regions of Strandzha. Their main occupation was livestock breeding, and especially sheep breeding, logging, charcoal production and mining. The second largest group are the Tronki who inhabit mainly the areas to the north and to the west of the park in Sredets Municipality. They made a living mainly in agriculture but also in sheep and cattle breeding. The Zagortsi inhabit the regions to the north of the park and are thought to have migrated from north-eastern Bulgaria.

The customs and rituals in Strandzha are related to specific days of the year, which in most cases coincide with the church holidays of the Christian calendar. They are traditionally divided into a summer (beginning on St George's Day, 6 May) and a winter period (beginning on St Demetrius' Day, 26 October). The largest festival in Strandzha is celebrated in mid-August in the historic area Petrova Niva in commemoration of the Ilinden–Preobrazhenie Uprising.

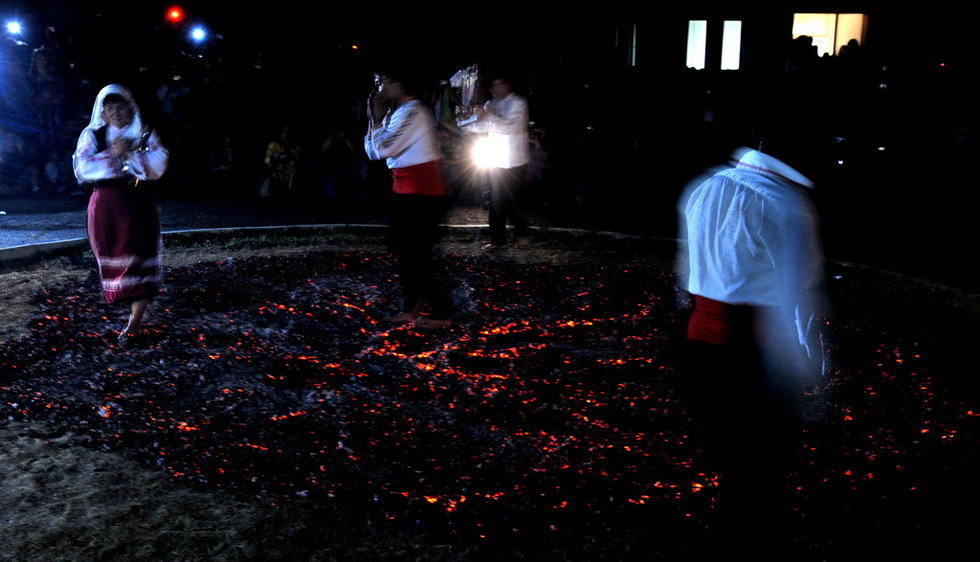
Nestinari in the village of Balgari

The most characteristic tradition in Strandzha is Nestinarstvo, which involves a barefoot dance on smouldering embers performed by nestinari. The ritual was practised in several Bulgarian and Greek villages in the region and was first documented in 1862 by the Bulgarian poet Petko Slaveykov. Some historians theorise that Nestinarstvo dates back to Thracian times. The ritual is performed on the feast days of Saints Constantine and Helena on 3 and 4 June when a pilgrim procession consisting of all residents, led by nestinari carrying icons, heads to a holy spring near the village, where they consecrate the icons and dance horo. After sunset, the crowd makes a large fire about 2 metres (2.2 yd) wide and 5 to 6 centimetres (2.4 in) thick and dances around it until the fire dies and only embers remain. The nestinari's barefoot dance on embers that follows as the climax of the night is accompanied by the beat of the sacred drum and the sound of a gaida (Bulgarian bagpipe). After the dance, the nestinari's feet do not show any trace of injury or burns. In the past the ritual was performed in the villages of Brodilovo, Gramatikovo, Kondolovo, Kosti and Slivarevo but nowadays Nestinarstvo is preserved in its authentic form only in the village of Balgari.

== Threats and conservation issues ==
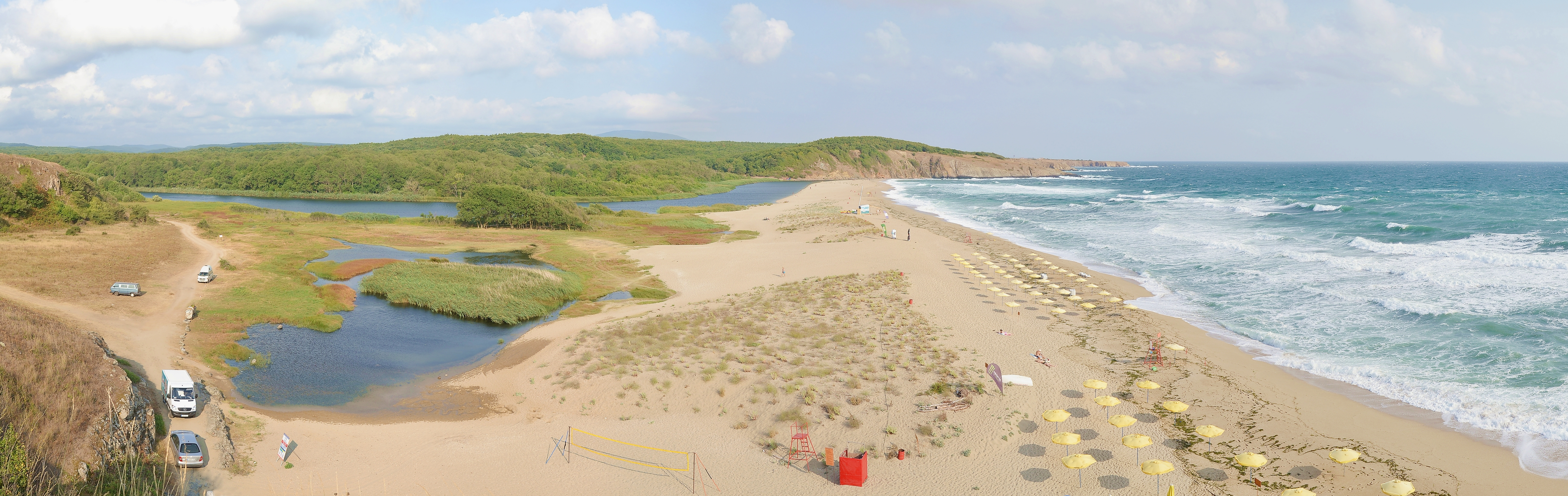
The coastline of the park near Sinemorets

The main threat to the park comes from the uncontrolled tourist development which has plagued the Bulgarian Black Sea coast since the early 1990s. So far, the coast of the Strandzha Nature Park has remained almost intact. The most notable example is the case of the Golden Pearl hotel complex near the village of Varvara, whose construction commenced in 2006 on the territory of the part, supported by Tsarevo Municipality without ecological evaluation. After protests the construction was declared illegal later that year but the mayor of Tsarevo and the investor appealed to the Supreme Administrative Court of Bulgaria. In June 2007 the Court revoked the protected status of Strandzha Nature Park with order No. 6794/29.06.2007. After mass protests the National Assembly adopted legislation prohibiting the right to appeal to court orders of the government establishing protected areas. In 2008 the Court declared the Golden Pearl hotel complex illegal and in 2012 the construction site was demolished.

The issues regarding the development of the park's coastline remain open. The Master Plan of Tsarevo Municipality adopted in 2008 and approved by the Ministry of Environment and Water envisages the construction of vacation complexes with 75,000 beds on the territory of the park and Natura 2000 network. As a result, the European Commission launched an infringement procedure against Bulgaria that forced the Ministry to withdraw the positive environmental assessment of the Master Plan in 2010 but the decision was rejected by the Supreme Administrative Court. The Strandzha Nature Park Management Plan drafted in 2003 has not yet meet with approval (Note: as of 2015) by the Ministry of Environment and Water.

== See also ==
- Geography of Bulgaria
- List of protected areas of Bulgaria
- List of mountains in Bulgaria
- Bulgarian Black Sea Coast
- Strandzha

== Sources ==
=== References ===
- International Union for Conservation of Nature (IUCN) (2005). Best Practice for Conservation Planning in Rural Areas: Biological and Landscape Diversity in Central and Eastern Europe. Gland, Switzerland and Cambridge, UK. ISBN 978-2-8317-0286-5.
- Bozhilov, Ivan; Gyuzelev, Vasil (1999). История на средновековна България VII–XIV век [History of Medieval Bulgaria VII–XIV centuries] (in Bulgarian). София (Sofia): Анубис (Anubis). ISBN 954-426-204-0.
- Donchev, Doncho; Karakashev, Hristo (2004). Теми по физическа и социално-икономическа география на България [Topics on Physical and Social-Economic Geography of Bulgaria] (in Bulgarian). София (Sofia): Ciela. ISBN 954-649-717-7.
- Kazhdan, A., ed. (1991). The Oxford Dictionary of Byzantium. New York, Oxford: Oxford University Press. ISBN 0-19-504652-8.
- Soustal, Peter (1991). Tabula Imperii Byzantini, Band 6: Thrakien (Thrakē, Rodopē und Haimimontos) (in German). Vienna: Verlag der Österreichischen Akademie der Wissenschaften. ISBN 3-7001-1898-8.
- Zlatarski, Vasil (1972) [1927]. V. Zlatarski - Istorija 1 B - Index История на българската държава през средните векове. Том I. История на Първото българско царство. [History of the Bulgarian state in the Middle Ages. Volume I. History of the First Bulgarian Empire.] (in Bulgarian) (2 ed.). София (Sofia): Наука и изкуство (Nauka i izkustvo). OCLC 67080314.

=== External links ===
- "Official Site of the Ministry of Environment and Water of Bulgaria".
- "Strandzha Nature Park". Official Site of Strandzha Nature Park.
- "Strandzha Nature Park" (in Bulgarian). Official Tourism Portal of Bulgaria. Archived from the original on 2 April 2015.
- "Strandzha Nature Park". Executive Environment Agency.
- "Strandzha" (in Bulgarian). Electronic History of Bulgaria hosted on the Bulgarian Knowledge Portal. Archived from the original on 19 March 2015.
- "Important Bird and Biodiversity Areas: Strandzha" (in Bulgarian). BirdLife International.
- "Malko Tarnovo and Strandzha" (in Bulgarian). Official Site of Malko Tarnovo Municipality. Archived from the original on 31 January 2020.
- "Nestinarstvo". UNESCO Intangible Cultural Heritage.
