= Brashlyan =

Brashlyan Бръшлян
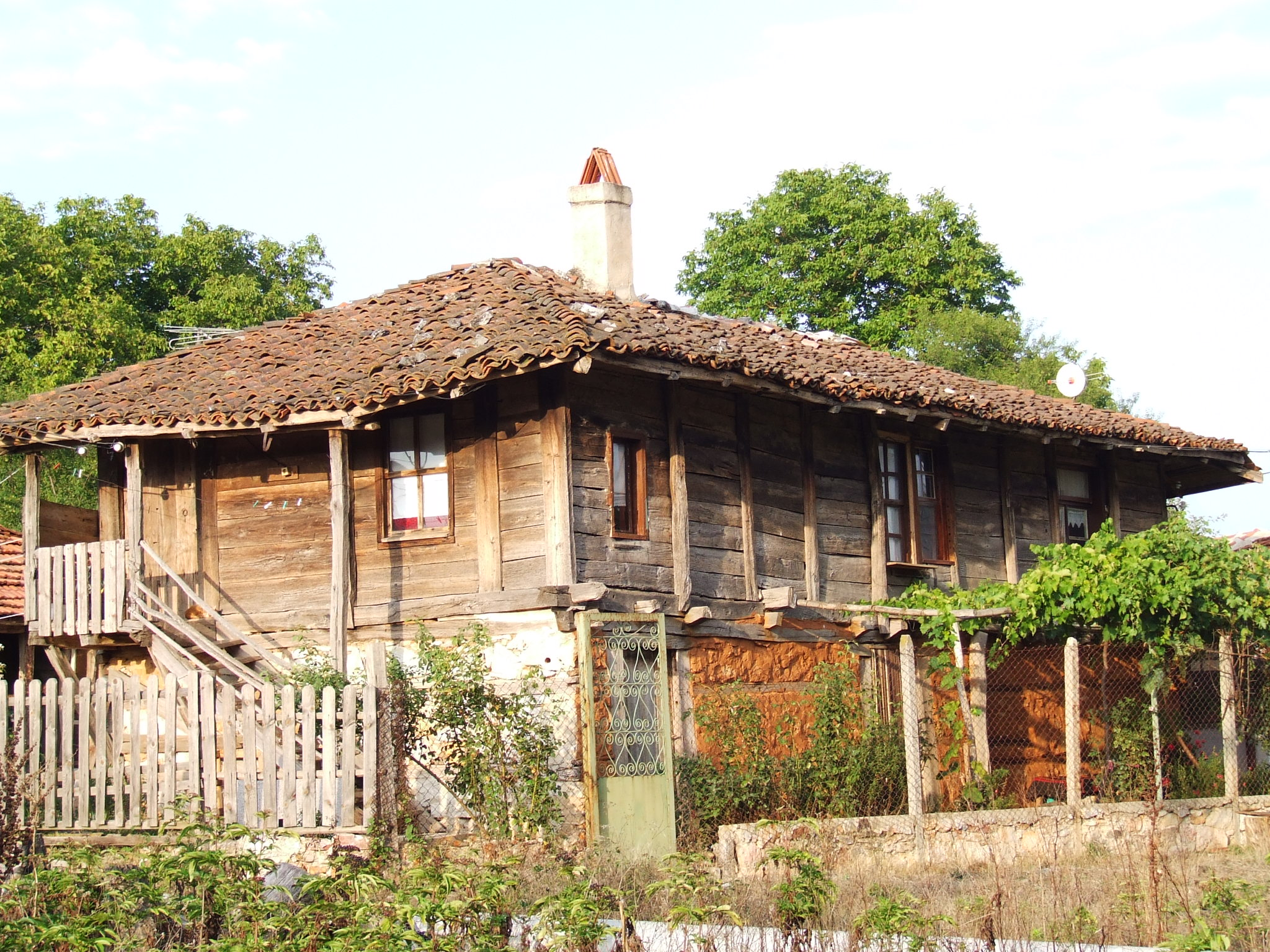
- Typical Strandzha wooden house in Brashlyan

- Location of Brashlyan
- Coordinates: 42°3′N 27°26′E
- Country: Bulgaria
- Province: Burgas
- Municipality: Malko Tarnovo Municipality

Government
  - Mayor: Ivan Ivanov (Malko Tarnovo municipality)
- Elevation: 240 m (790 ft)

Population (2008)
  - Total: 56
- Time zone: UTC+2 (EET)
  - Summer (DST): UTC+3 (EEST)
- Postal Code: 8357
- Area code: 05952

Brashlyan (Bulgarian: Бръшлян, 'ivy') is a village in Malko Tarnovo Municipality, in Burgas Province, in southeastern Bulgaria. Known as Sarmashik until 1934, today the entire village is an architectural reserve displaying characteristic Strandzha wooden architecture from the mid-17th to the 19th century.

Brashlyan lies in the low Strandzha mountains of Bulgaria's southeast, 14 kilometres (8.7 mi) northwest of Malko Tarnovo, 64 kilometres (40 mi) south of Burgas and 4 kilometres (2.5 mi) from the Bulgaria–Turkey border. The village traces its foundation to the 17th century when the residents of the Yurtet, Selishte and Zhivak neighbourhoods settled in the Lower Neighbourhood of Brashlyan. The village was mentioned in Ottoman tax registers of the mid-17th century as part of the district of Anchialos (Pomorie) and grew into a major centre of animal husbandry by the 19th century. The old name Sarmashik was from Ottoman Turkish sarmaşık and had the same meaning, "ivy".

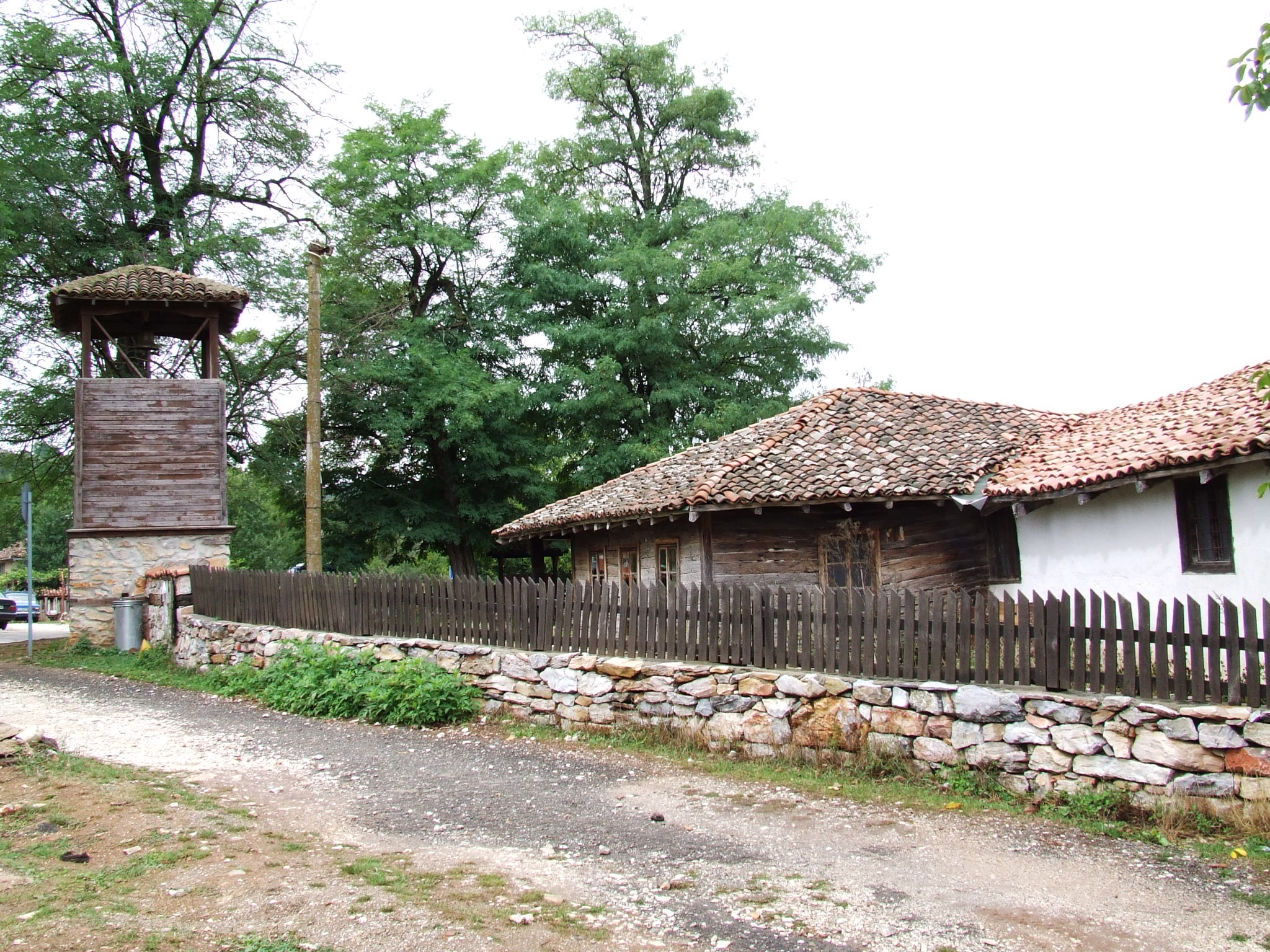
The St Demetrius Church (17th century)

The Sarmashik Affair, a predecessor of the Ilinden-Preobrazhenie Uprising, took place in Brashlyan in 1903. A band of the Internal Macedonian-Adrianopolitan Revolutionary Organization was surrounded by Ottoman troops in the Balyuva House on 2 April; the band leader (voivode) Pano Angelov and the member Nikola Ravashola were killed by the Ottomans. The locals also participated in the actual uprising. According to Lyubomir Miletich's demographic survey of the Ottoman province of Edirne in The Destruction of Thracian Bulgarians in 1913, published in 1918, before the wars Sarmashik (Сармашикъ) was a village in the district of Malko Tarnovo inhabited by 150 Bulgarian Exarchist families.

The village became part of the Kingdom of Bulgaria in 1913, after the Balkan Wars. Since the mid-20th century, many local residents have moved to Burgas or Malko Tarnovo. From a population of 650 in 1926, the village's inhabitants have decreased to around 50 by 2008. In 1982, Brashlyan was proclaimed an architectural and historical reserve. 76 local houses from the 18th–19th century are cultural monuments, of which nine are of national importance. The oldest house dates to the mid-17th century and is still inhabited. The monastical school (working in 1871–1877), the St Pantaleon, St Petka and St Marina chapels and the 17th-century bell tower of the St Demetrius Church have been restored by a local association; an ethnographic collection and an open-air museum of agriculture were set up as well. There are traces of Thracian sanctuaries and dolmens several kilometres from the village.

Brashlyan is part of the Strandzha Nature Park. The village's territory borders that of the Vitanovo Reserve, the Veleka river valley and the trout breeding pool on the Katun River. The village's fair is organized annually in early August, usually around the 8th, and lasts two days. Brashlyan is mentioned in the "Strandzha Marseillaise", the song The Clear Moon is Already Rising, written by the leader of the Lozengrad revolutionary district Yani Popov:

[The heroes] are hurrying, hurrying to arrive
before cockcrow in Sarmashik.
So that nobody anticipates
and meanly betrays them.
...
O Sarmashik, glorious village
from the heroic struggle,
O Sarmashik, new flag
of Thracian freedom.

== Gallery ==
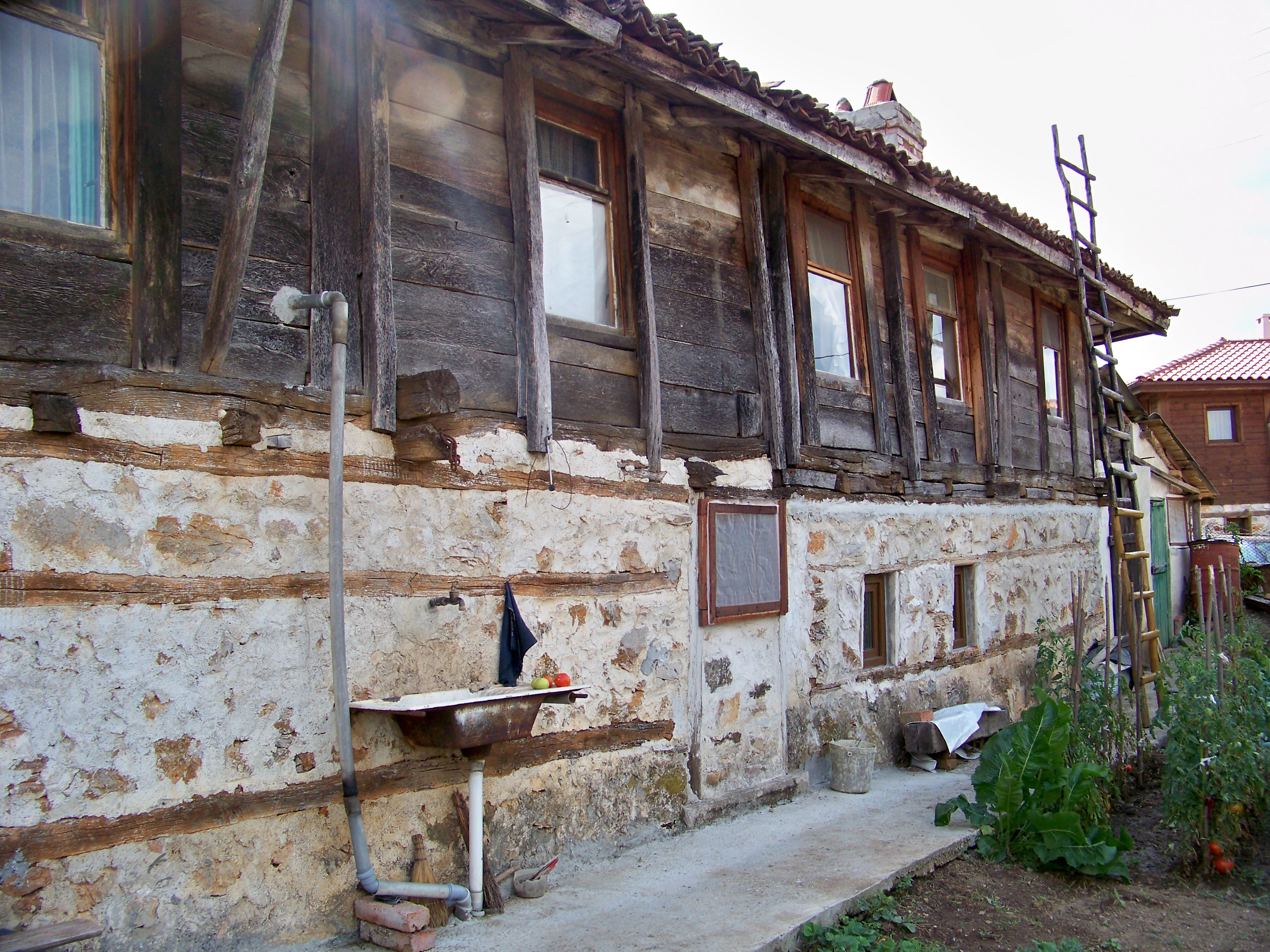

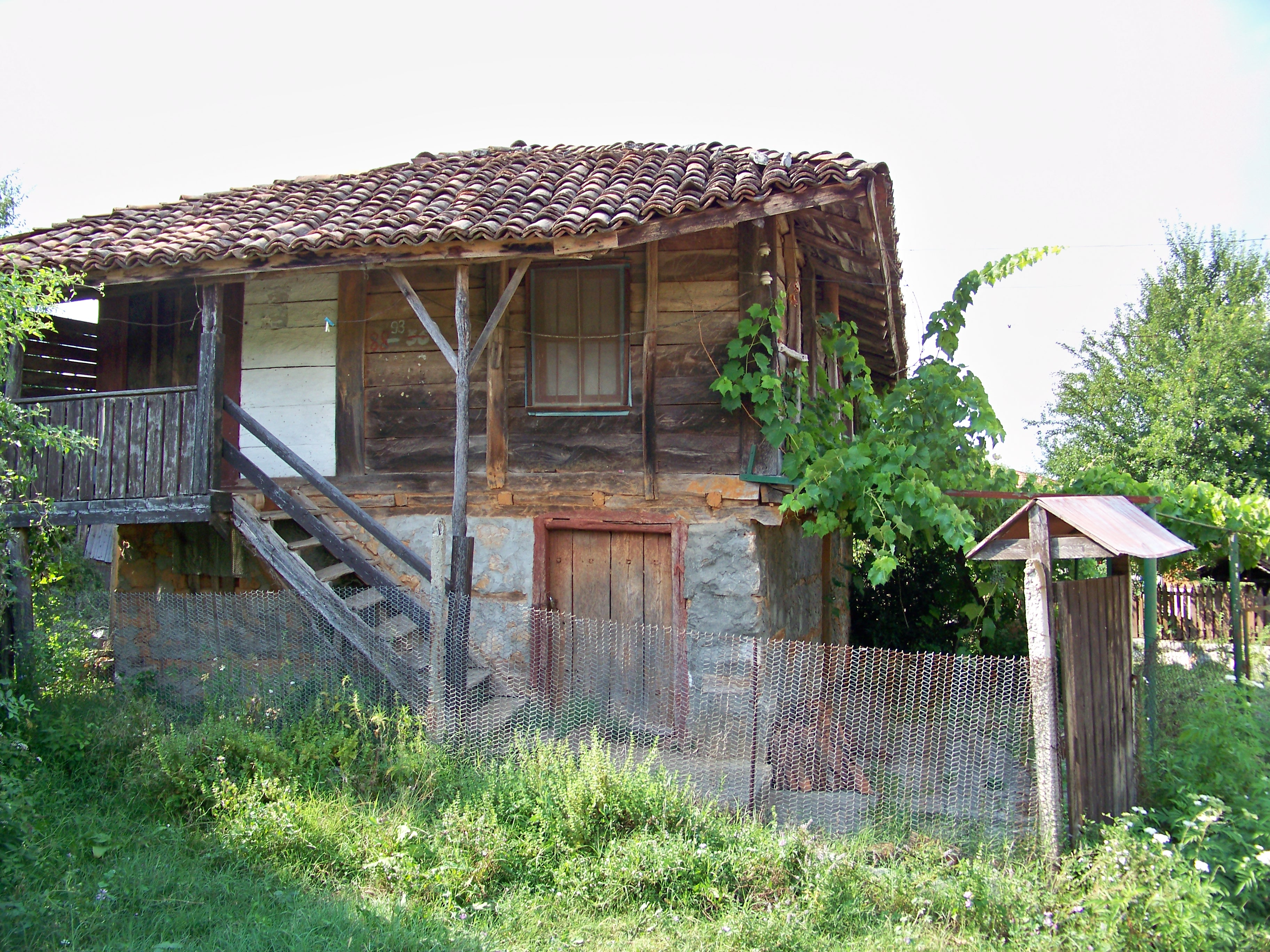

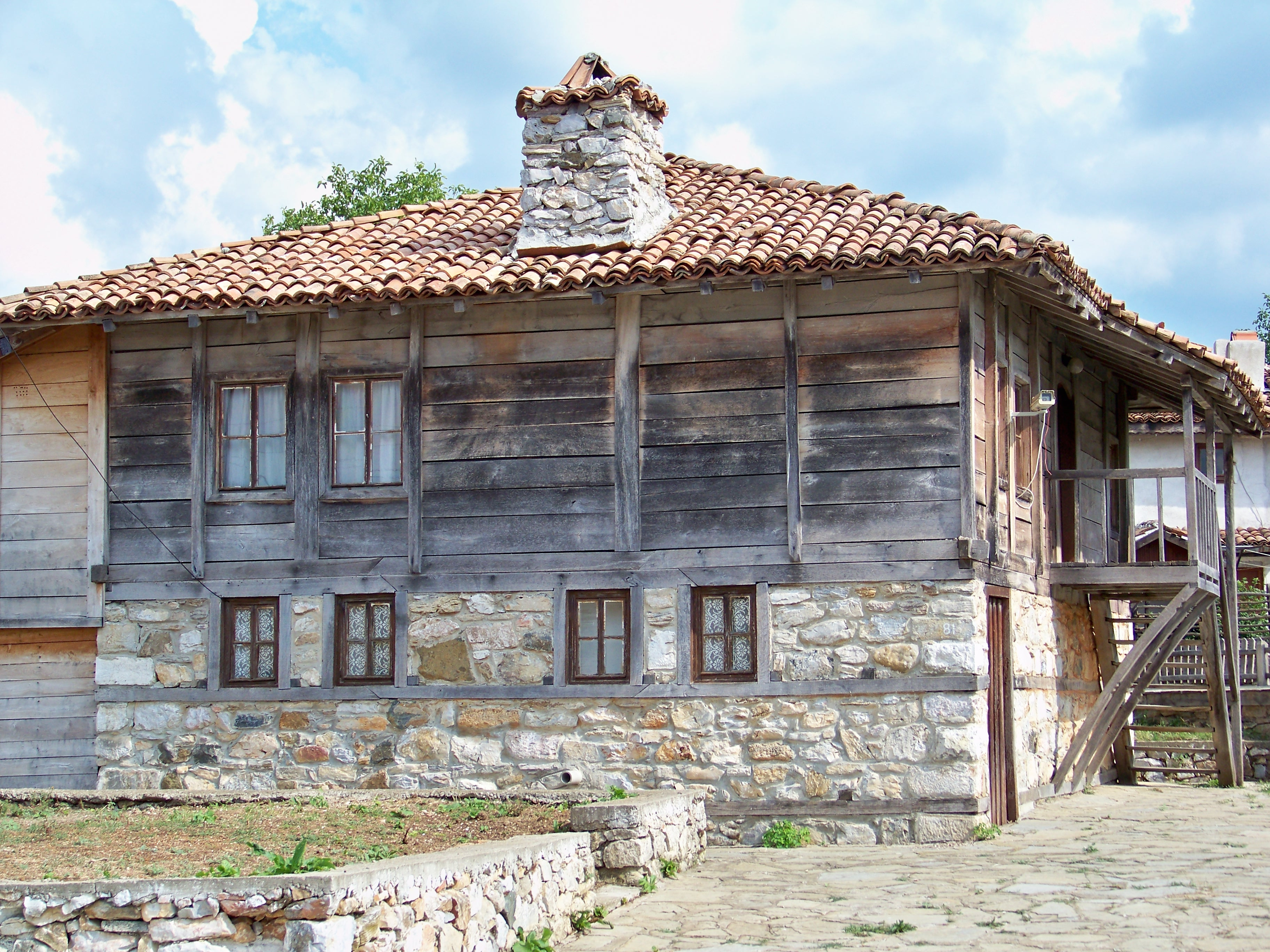

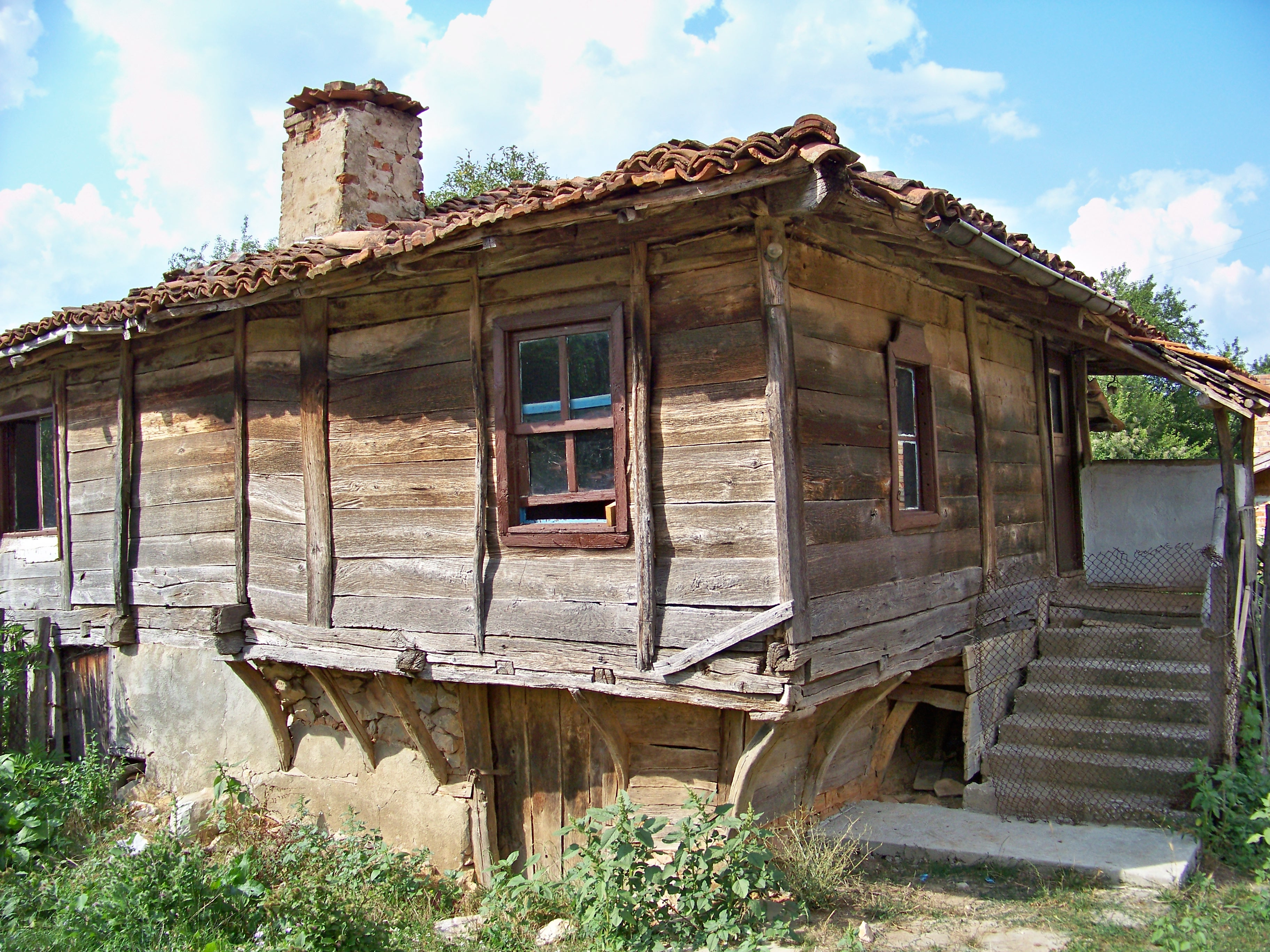

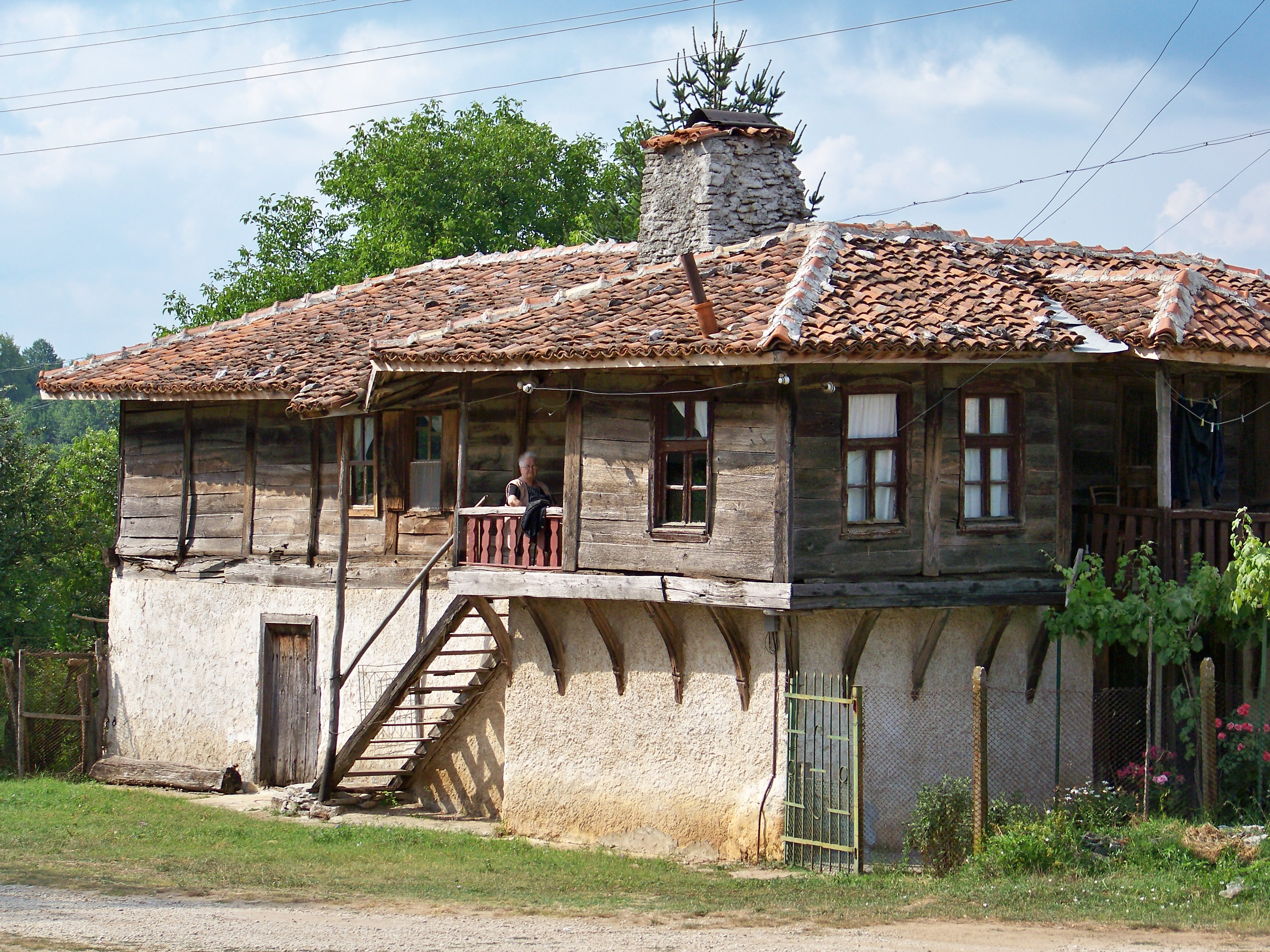

== Honours ==
Brashlyan Cove in Smith Island, Antarctica is named after the village.
