= Silistar =

Protected area in Bulgaria

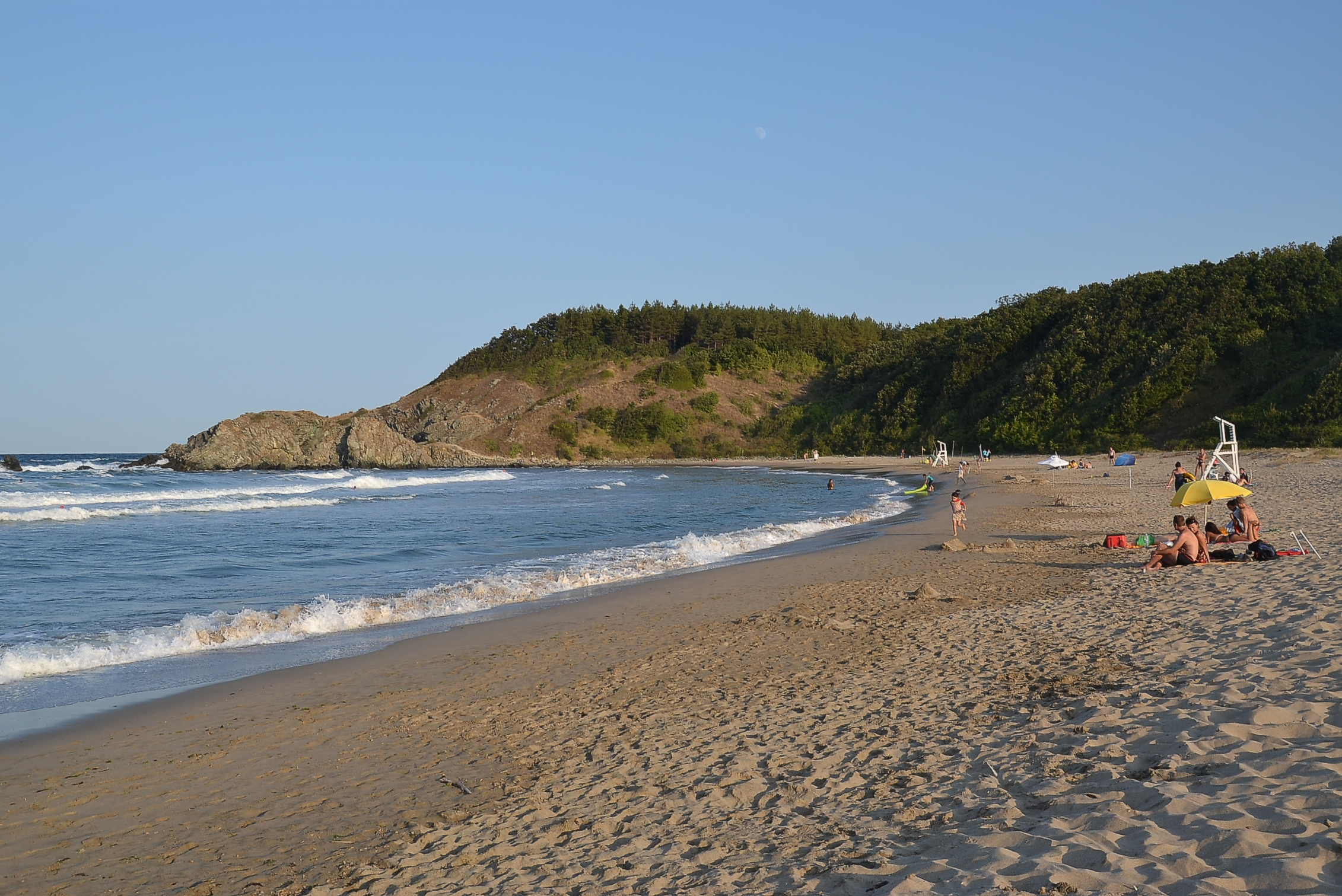
- Silistar Beach

- Location within Bulgaria
- Location: Tsarevo Municipality, Burgas Province, Bulgaria
- Coordinates: 42°01′19″N 28°00′18″E
- Established: 1992

Silistar (Bulgarian: Силистар) is a protected area in the Tsarevo Municipality, Burgas Province, Bulgaria. It includes a river of the same name and a beach. Camping is allowed there.

== Geography ==
It is located about between the villages of Sinemorets and Rezovo, about 5 km from either. It is near the border to Turkey at the mouth of the eponymous river Silistar.

== History ==
Silistar was declared a protected area in 1992 by the Ministry of Environment of Bulgaria. It falls on the territory of the Strandzha Nature Park. Both protected areas are part of the European ecological network Natura 2000.

== Gallery ==
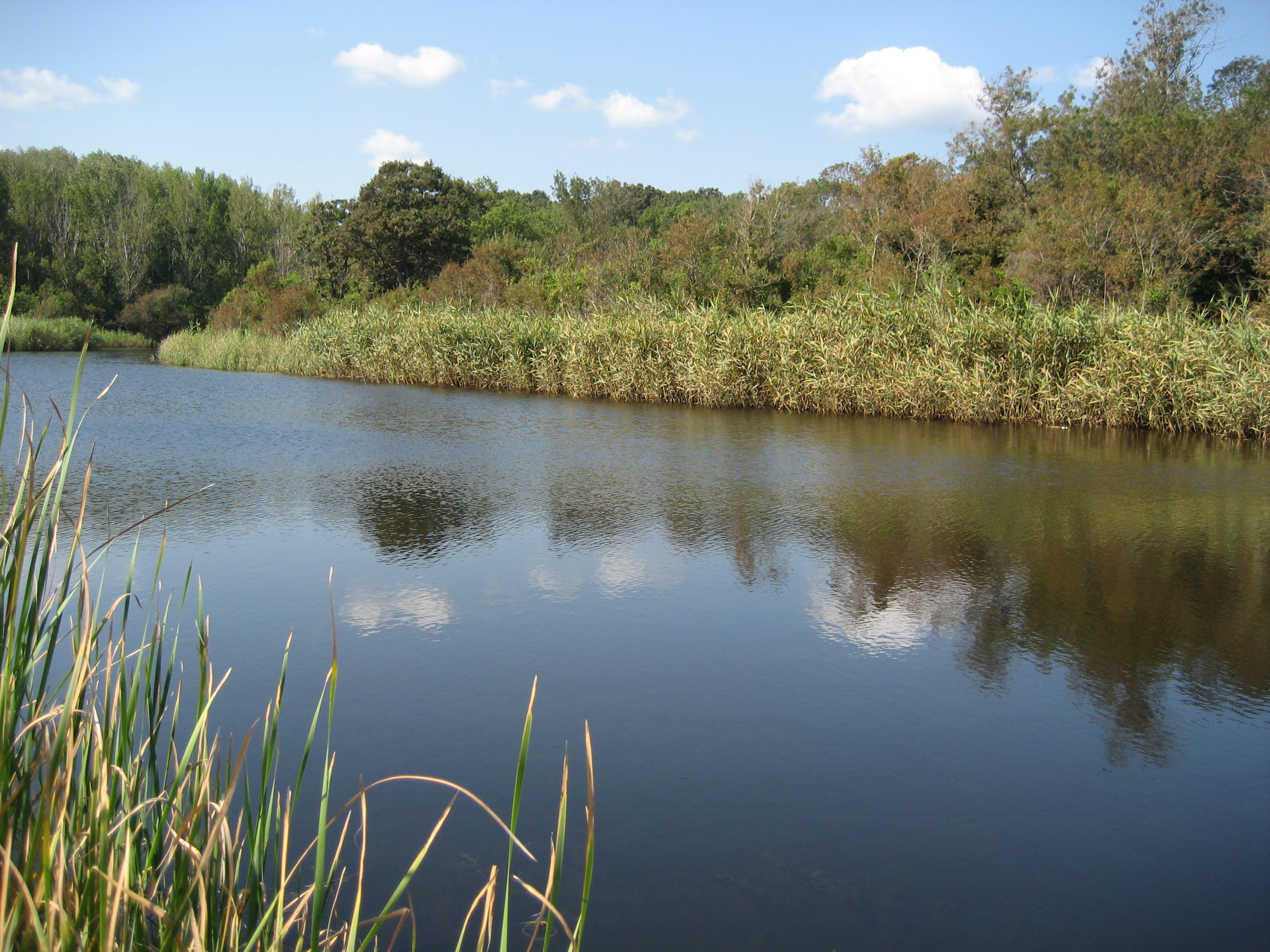
The river Silistar

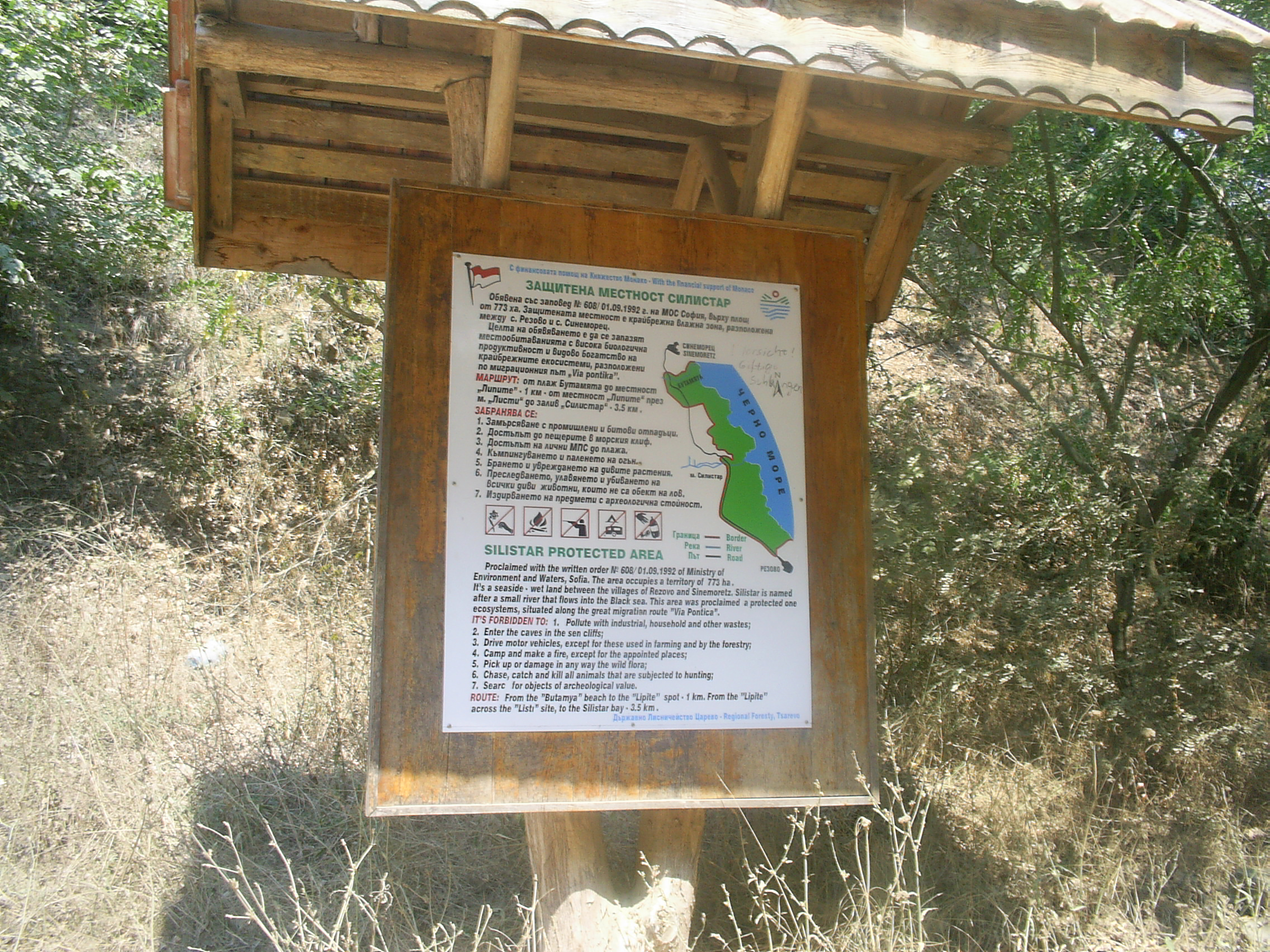
Information on the protected area

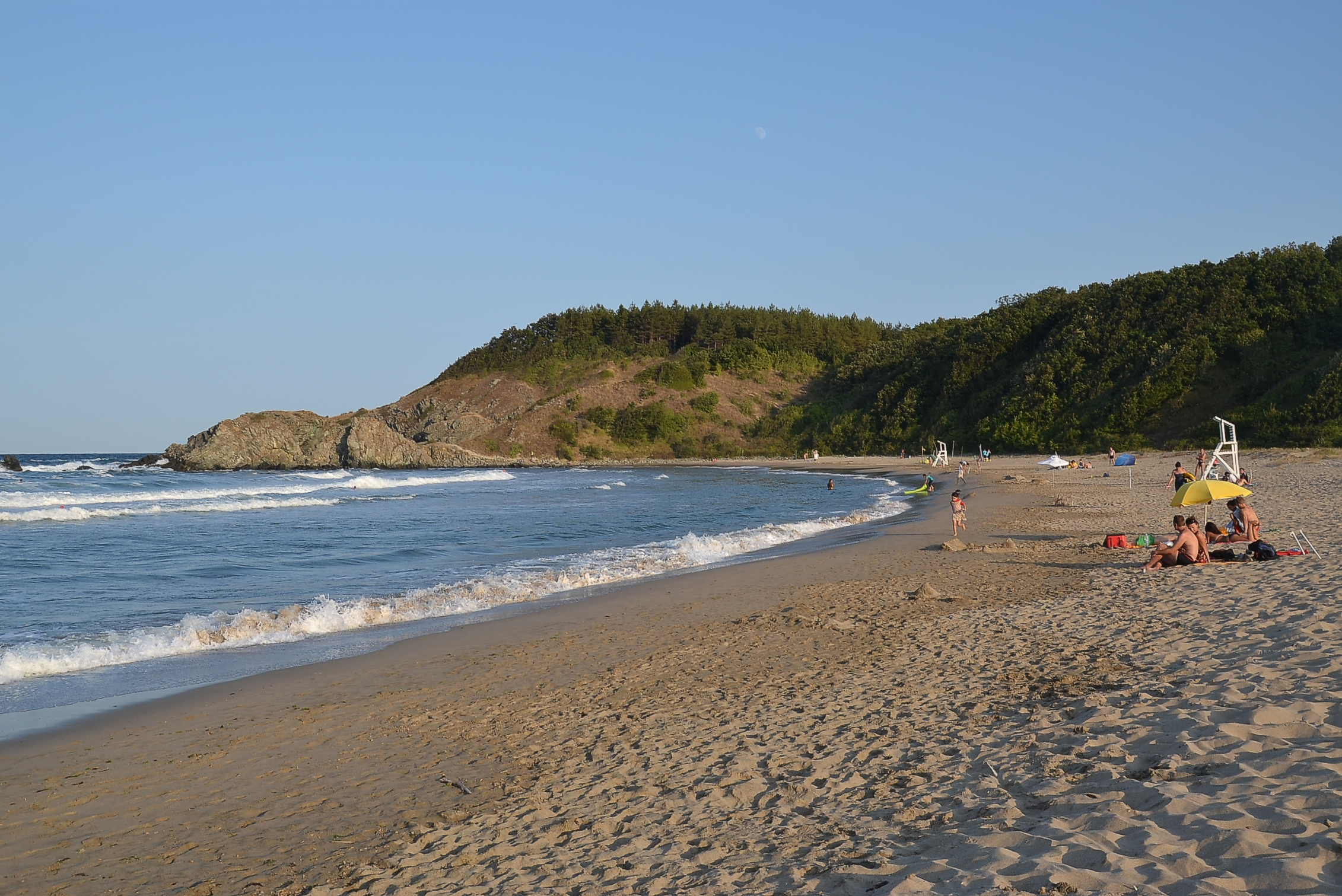
Silistar Beach

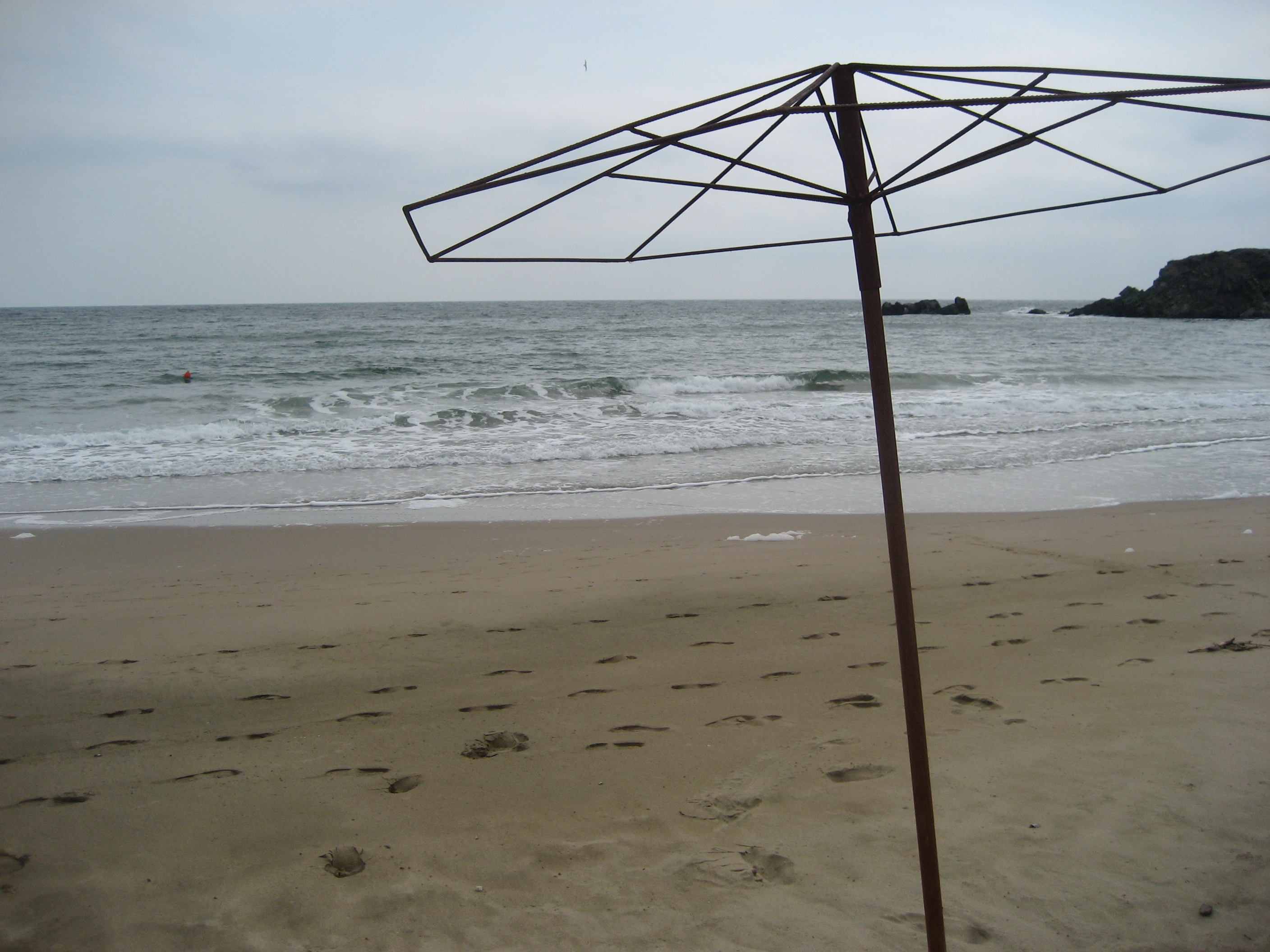
Silistar Beach

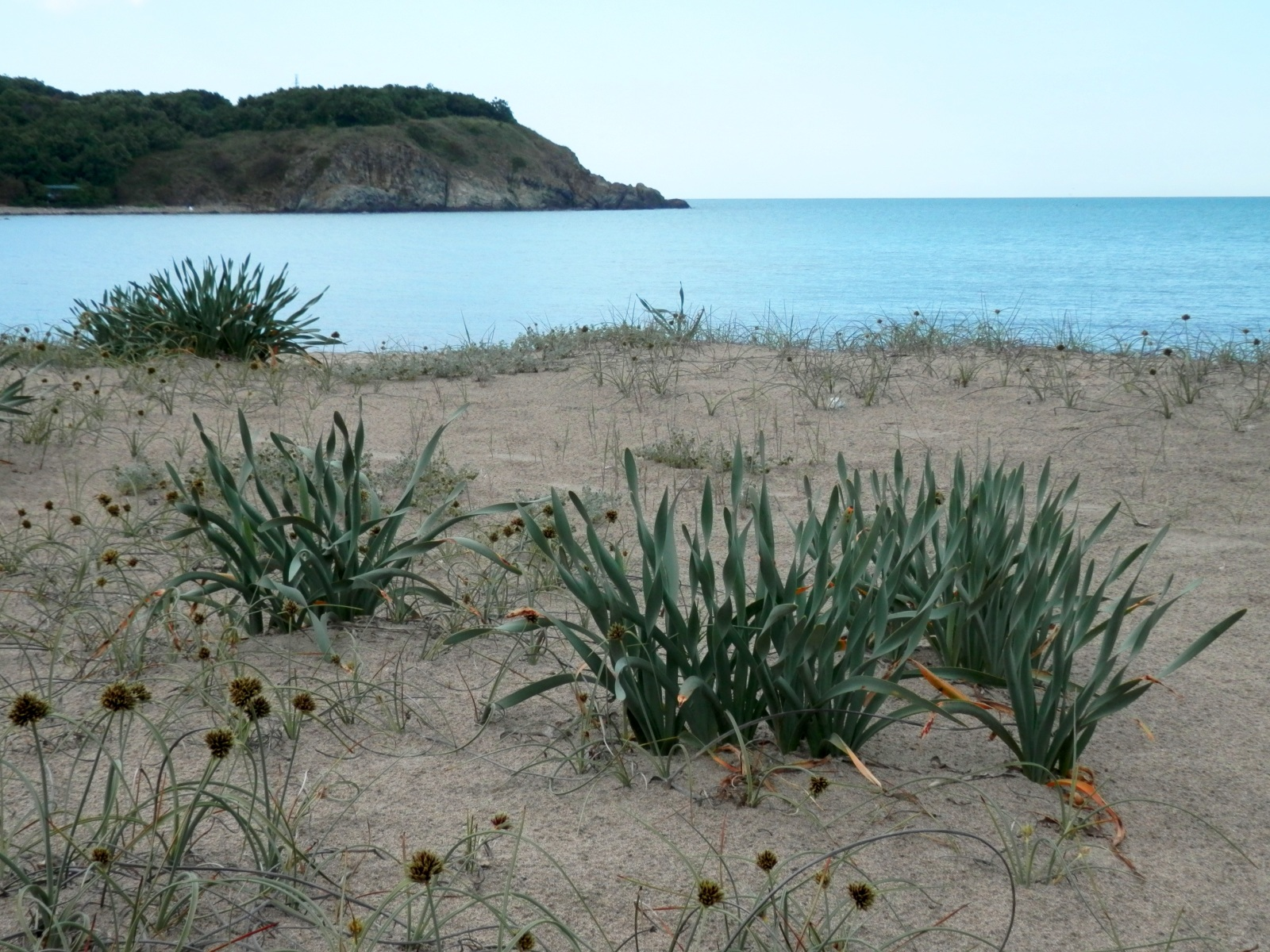
Sea daffodils growing on Silistar Beach
