= Vitanovo Reserve =

Nature reserve in Bulgaria

Vitanovo Nature Reserve
- IUCN category Ia (strict nature reserve)
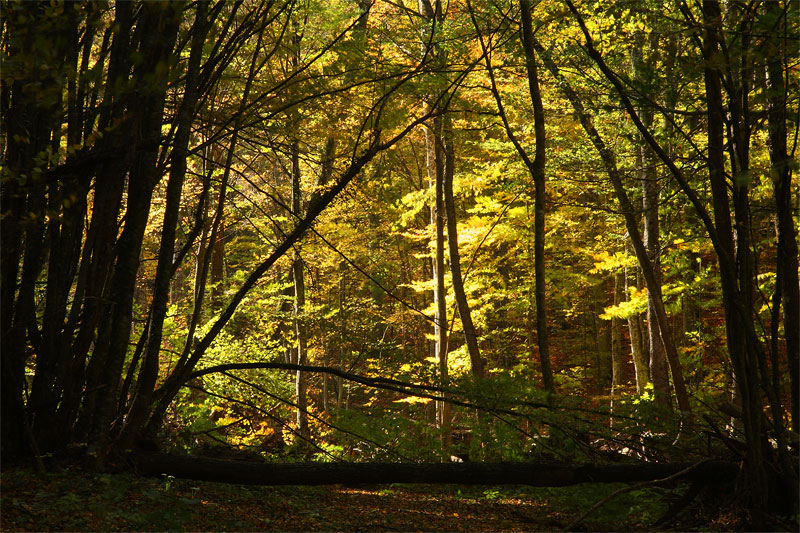

- Location within Bulgaria
- Location: Municipality of Malko Tarnovo, Burgas Province, Bulgaria
- Nearest city: Malko Tarnovo
- Coordinates: 41°59′38″N 27°25′29″E
- Area: 11.124 km^{2} (4.295 sq mi)
- Established: 1981
- Governing body: Ministry of Environment and Water

Vitanovo (Bulgarian: Витаново) is a nature reserve in the Strandzha mountains of south-eastern Bulgaria. Vitanovo is one of the five reserves situated in Strandzha Nature Park. It lies in south-eastern Bulgaria near the border with Turkey. The reserve encompasses an area of 1112.4 ha or 11.124 km^{2}. The reserve can only be accessed with a special permission, issued by the Ministry of Environment and Water of Bulgaria, for conducting research or for specialized tourism under strict rules and routes.

The nearest village is Brashlyan in the Municipality of Malko Tarnovo.

Within the territory of the reserve there are 462 species of plants: 421 herbaceous, 26 relict and 9 Balkan endemic species. The reserve is characterized by forests of Fagus orientalis, Carpinus betulus, Quercus frainetto, Quercus cerris and different species of oak.

Among the natural landmarks in Vitanovo are karst springs and caves, the most studied of which is the Bratanova Cave.
