= Balgari =

- Village
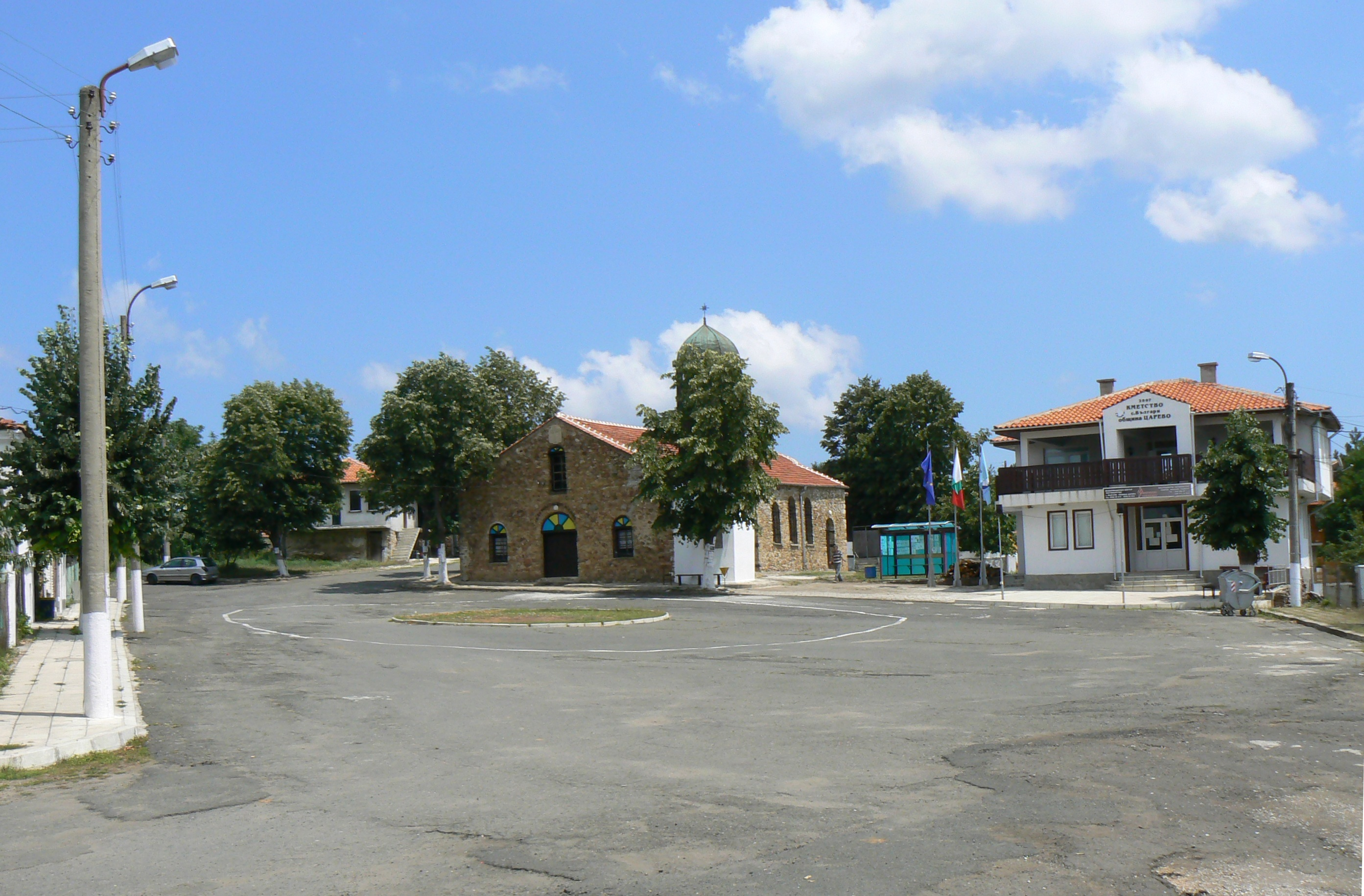
- In front of the church and municipal hall

- Location within Bulgaria
- Coordinates: 42°06′N 27°44′E
- Country: Bulgaria
- Province: Burgas Province
- Municipality: Tsarevo Municipality
- Time zone: UTC+2 (EET)
  - Summer (DST): UTC+3 (EEST)

Balgari (Bulgarian: Българи) is a village in Tsarevo Municipality, in Burgas Province, in southeastern Bulgaria. Balgar lies within the territory of Strandzha Nature Park and is one of the few places in Strandzha which has preserved the traditional Nestinarstvo firedancing ritual. The village is the only one in Strandzha with the status of a folklore reserve.
