= Slivarovo =

Slivarovo Bulgarian: Сливарово
- Village
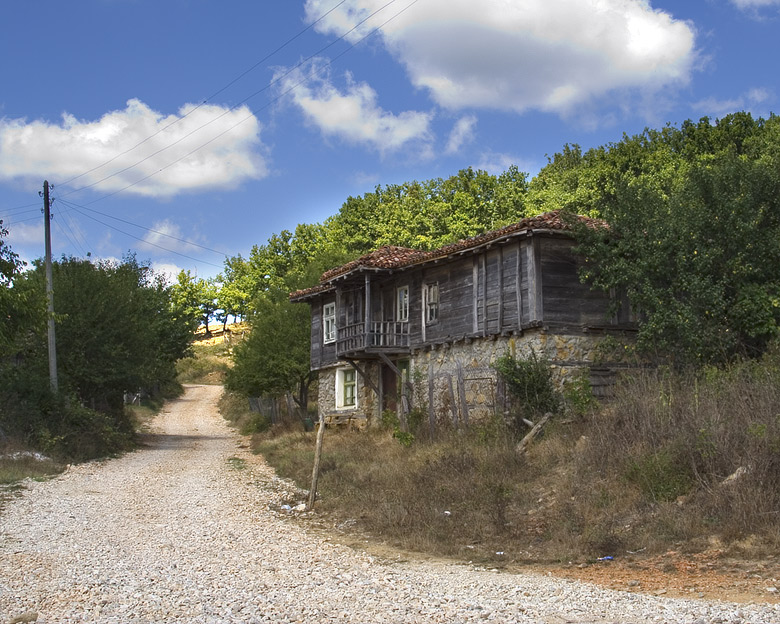

- Location within Bulgaria
- Coordinates: 41°58′N 27°40′E
- Country: Bulgaria
- Province: Burgas Province
- Municipality: Malko Tarnovo Municipality

Population (2022)
  - Total: 3
- Time zone: UTC+2 (EET)
  - Summer (DST): UTC+3 (EEST)

Slivarovo (Bulgarian: Сливарово) is a village in Malko Tarnovo Municipality, in Burgas Province, in southeastern Bulgaria. It is situated in Strandzha Nature Park.

The village was known as Kladara from the 17th century. It is situated close to the Thracian fortress Kladara.
