= Zvezdets =

Zvezdets Bulgarian: Звездец
- Village
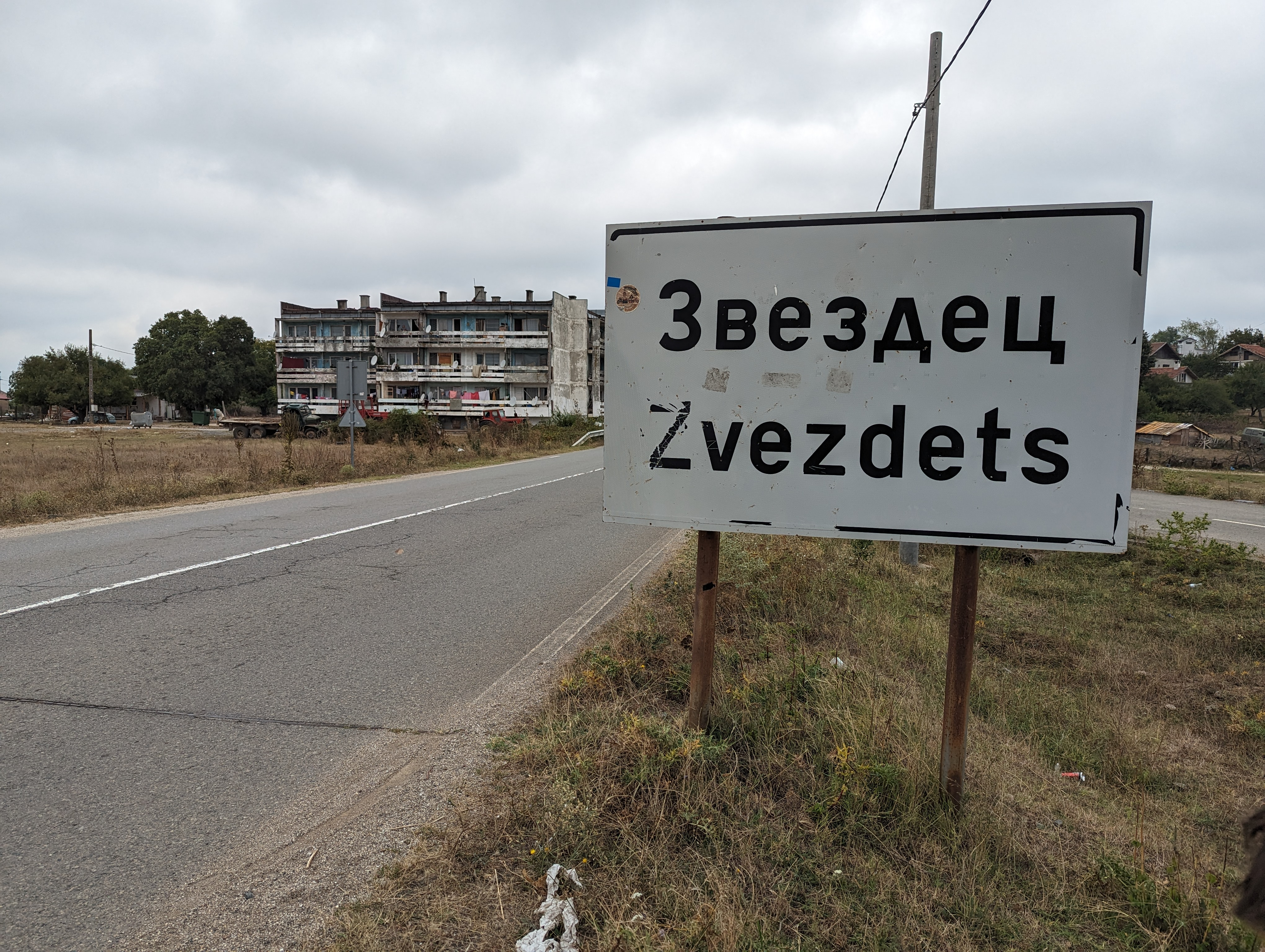

- Location within Bulgaria
- Coordinates: 42°07′N 27°25′E
- Country: Bulgaria
- Province: Burgas Province
- Municipality: Malko Tarnovo Municipality
- Time zone: UTC+2 (EET)
  - Summer (DST): UTC+3 (EEST)

Zvezdets (Bulgarian: Звездец) is a village in Malko Tarnovo Municipality, in Burgas Province, in southeastern Bulgaria, close to the border with Turkey. It is situated in Strandzha Nature Park.
