= Ministry of Environment and Water (Bulgaria) =

Government ministry of Bulgaria

- Министерство на околната среда и водите

Agency overview
- Formed: 1976
- Jurisdiction: Government of Bulgaria
- Headquarters: 22 Maria Louiza Blvd., Sofia
- Agency executive: Borislav Sandov, Minister of Environment and Water
- Website: Ministry of Environment and Water

The Ministry of Environment and Water (Bulgarian: Министерство на околната среда и водите, romanized: Ministerstvo na okolnata sreda i vodite) is a Bulgarian government ministry responsible for environment protection.

The predecessor of the ministry is the Environmental Protection Committee attached to the Council of Ministers and established on 19 June 1976. It was elevated to a Ministry of Environment in 1990 and has its current structure since 1997.
