= Malko Tarnovo Municipality =

Coordinates: 41.9794°N 27.5268°E

Malko Tarnovo Municipality Община Малко Търново
- Municipality (Obshtina)
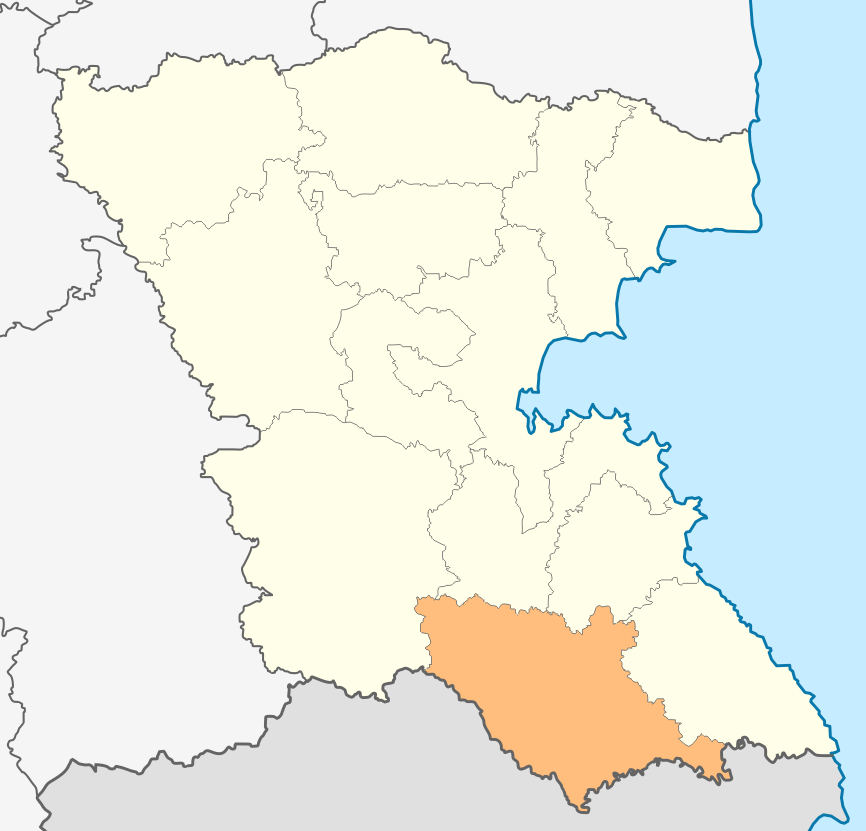
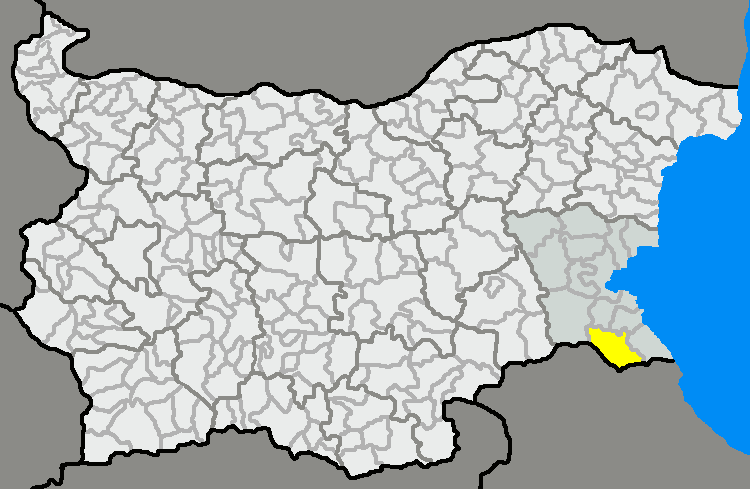
- Location in Burgas province Location on map of Bulgaria
- Country: Bulgaria
- Province (Oblast): Burgas
- Seat: Malko Tarnovo

Area
  - Total: 783.67 km^{2} (302.58 sq mi)

Population (2011)
  - Total: 3,793
  - Density: 4.840/km^{2} (12.54/sq mi)
- Time zone: UTC+2 (EET)
  - Summer (DST): UTC+3 (EEST)
- Website: www.malkotarnovo.org

Malko Tarnovo Municipality (Bulgarian: Община Малко Търново, Obshtina Malko Tarnovo) is a municipality in Burgas Province, Bulgaria. It includes the town of Malko Tarnovo and a number of villages.

== Demographics ==
=== Religion ===
According to the latest Bulgarian census of 2011, the religious composition, among those who answered the optional question on religious identification, was the following:

Religious composition of Malko Tarnovo Municipality
Orthodox Christianity	70.6%
Catholicism	3.1%
Protestantism	4.2%
Islam	0.0%
No religion	15.7%
Prefer not to answer, others and aindefinable	6.4%
