= II-99 road (Bulgaria) =

Road in Bulgaria

Republic Road I-99
- Републикански път I-99

Route information
- Length: 109.1 km (67.8 mi)

Major junctions
- From: Km 248.8 of I-7, Burgas
- To: Km 319.3 of I-9, Malko Tarnovo

Location
- Country: Bulgaria
- Towns: Burgas, Sozopol, Tsarevo, Malko Tarnovo

Highway system
- Highways in Bulgaria

Republican Road II-99 (Bulgarian: Републикански път II-99) is a 2nd class road in southeastern Bulgaria, running entirely through the territory of Burgas Province. Its length is 109.1 km. The road follows most of the southern Bulgarian Black Sea Coast.

== Route description ==
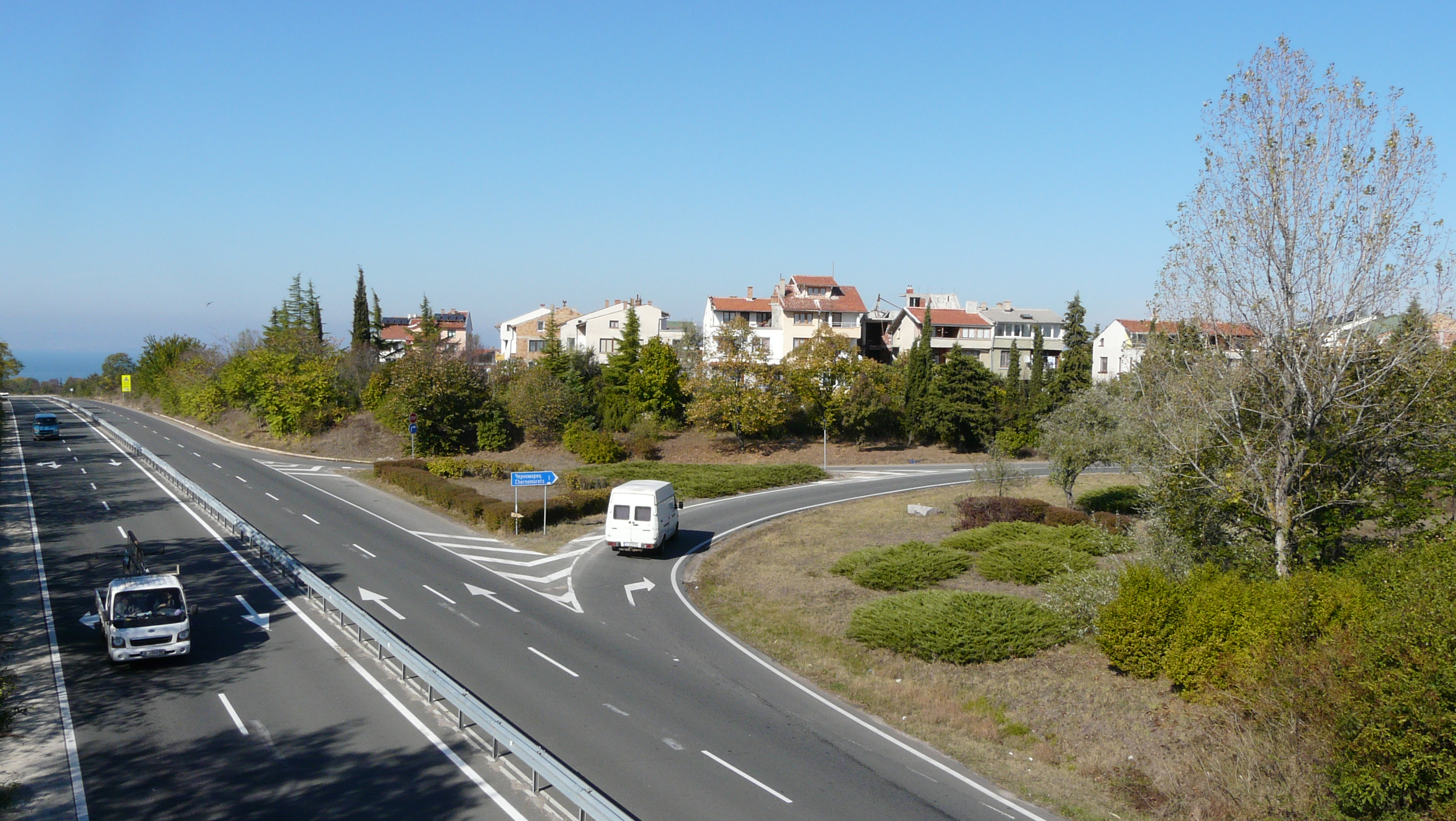
II-99 near Chernomorets

The road starts at Km 248.8 of the first class I-9 road southwest of the Kraymorie neighbourhood of the city of Burgas, and heads east through the ridges of Rosen Bair and Medni Rid, parallel to the south coast of the Gulf of Burgas. At the town of Chernomorets it turns south and then southeast, following the southern coast of the Sozopol Bay and reaches the town of Sozopol. In the section Burgas–Sozopol the road has four lanes. From the town the II-99 follows a new route through the eastern slopes of Medni Rid, instead of the old one along the coast, until the area north of the river Ropotamo. After crossing the river, the road ascends a low saddle and west of the town of Primorsko descends into the valley of the river Dyavolska reka. From there to the town of Tsarevo it runs parallel to the coast. In this section, the II-99 passes west of the town of Kiten and the village of Lozenets, before reaching the southwestern part of Tsarevo.

At the town the road heads inland in direction southwest and ascends the Bosna Ridge of the Strandzha mountain range, following its crest west through the Strandzha Nature Park, the largest protected area in Bulgaria. It passes through the villages of Izgrev, Balgari and Kondolovo. Some 4 km after the latter the road turns south, passes through the village of Gramatikovo and descends along the southern slopes of Bosna to the deep valley of the river Veleka. After crossing the river it continues southwest, ascends the Granichia Ridge of Strandzha, passes east of the town of Malko Tarnovo and southeast of the town reaches its terminus at Km 319.3 of the first class I-9 road, close to the Bulgaria–Turkey border.
