= Malko Tarnovo =

Town in Burgas, Bulgaria

Malko Tarnovo Малко Търново
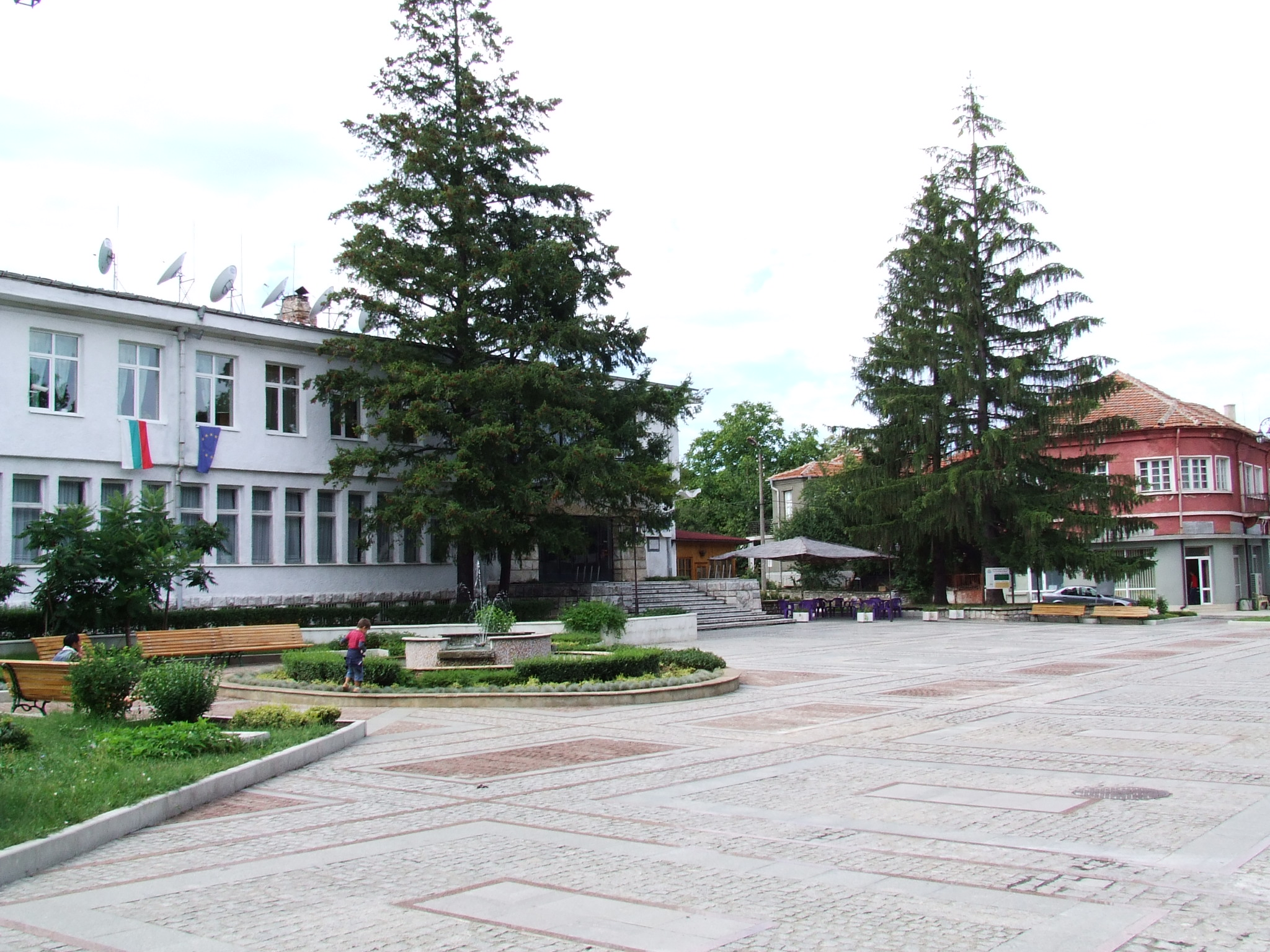

- Coat of arms

- Location of Malko Tarnovo
- Coordinates: 41°59′N 27°32′E
- Country: Bulgaria
- Province (Oblast): Burgas

Government
  - Mayor: Iliyan Yanchev
- Elevation: 348 m (1,142 ft)

Population (December 2024)
  - Total: 1,576
- Time zone: UTC+2 (EET)
  - Summer (DST): UTC+3 (EEST)
- Postal Code: 8350
- Area code: 05952

Malko Tarnovo (Bulgarian: Малко Търново [ˈmaɫko ˈtɤrnovo], "Little Tarnovo"; as opposed to Veliko Tarnovo) is a town in Burgas Province, southeastern Bulgaria, 5 km from the Turkish border. It is the only town in the interior of the Bulgarian Strandzha Mountains and lies in Strandzha Nature Park. Malko Tarnovo is the administrative centre of the homonymous Malko Tarnovo Municipality. As of December 2024, the town had 1,576 inhabitants.

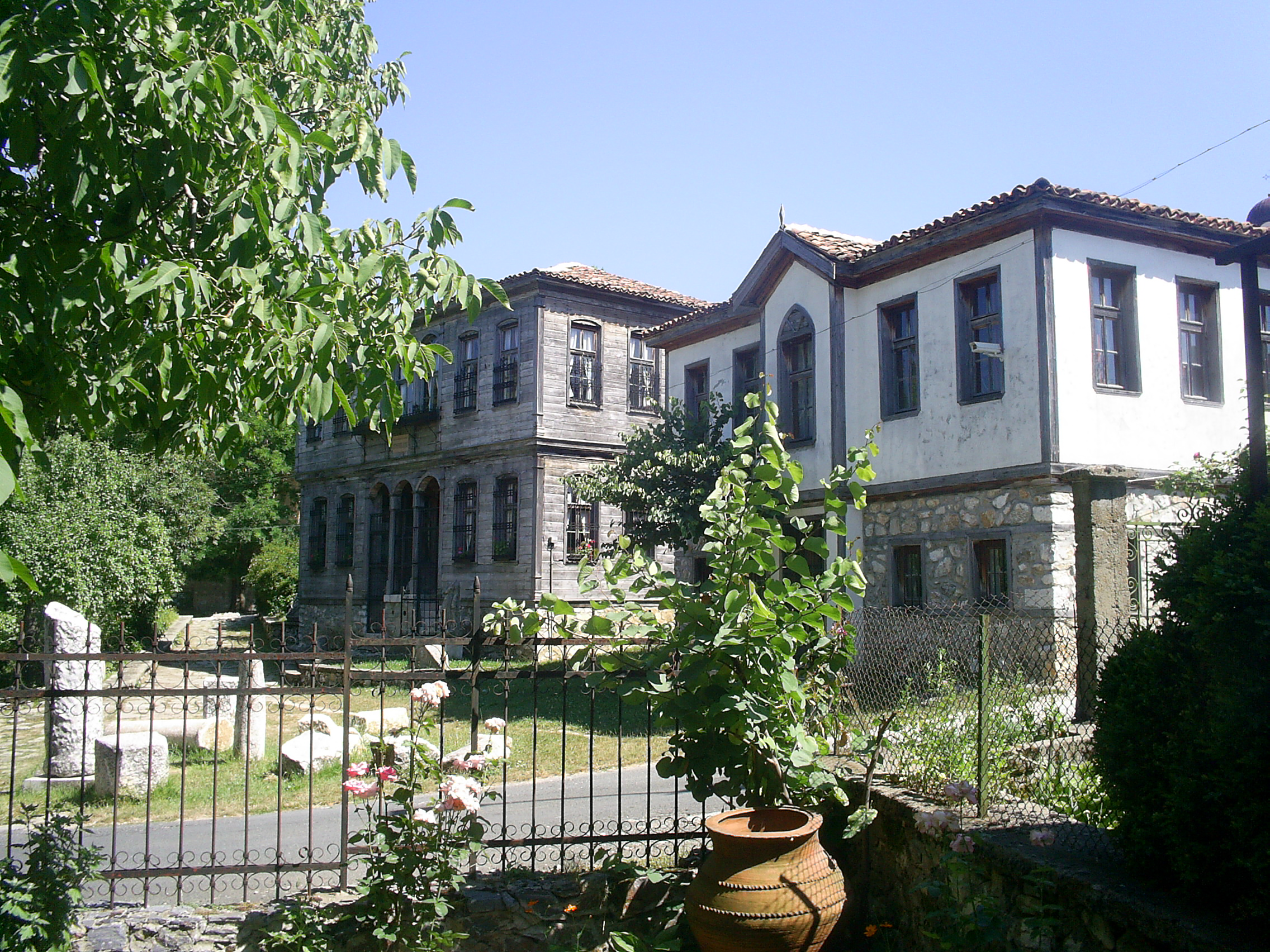
Historic buildings in Malko Tarnovo

Christianity is the dominant religion in the town, where an Eastern Orthodox and an Eastern Rite Catholic church exist. According to Lyubomir Miletich's demographic survey of the Ottoman province of Edirne in The Destruction of Thracian Bulgarians in 1913, published in 1918, before the wars Malko Tarnovo was a district centre inhabited by 1,200 Bulgarian Exarchist families and 80 Eastern Catholic Bulgarian families.

Before the Balkan Wars (1912–1913), Malko Tarnovo was a township (kaza) of the Kırklareli sanjak in Edirne vilayet as "Tırnovacık" that was ceded to Bulgaria following the wars.

Since 25 October 1913, it has been within the borders of Bulgaria.

== Climate ==
The climate of Strandzha is influenced by the proximity of the Black, Marmara and Aegean seas which clearly distinguishes the local climate from that of the rest of Bulgaria. The region is among the warmest in the country with temperatures rarely falling below 0 °C in winter and rising above 24 °C in summer due to the cooling effect of the Black Sea. The average temperature drops with the rising elevation in the interior which creates conditions for more frequent and longer-lasting mists, heavier snowfall and earlier frosts. In winter frequent fogs lead to hard rime and the icing of the forests at altitudes above 500 metres (0 yd).

Climate data for Malko Tarnovo
Month	Jan	Feb	Mar	Apr	May	Jun	Jul	Aug	Sep	Oct	Nov	Dec	Year
Mean daily maximum °C (°F)	5.1 (41.2)	6.7 (44.1)	8.1 (46.6)	15.6 (60.1)	20.8 (69.4)	24.6 (76.3)	27.1 (80.8)	27.9 (82.2)	23.5 (74.3)	17.9 (64.2)	12.9 (55.2)	7.9 (46.2)	16.6 (61.9)
Daily mean °C (°F)	1.4 (34.5)	2.8 (37.0)	4.5 (40.1)	10.0 (50.0)	14.9 (58.8)	18.6 (65.5)	20.6 (69.1)	20.7 (69.3)	16.6 (61.9)	12.2 (54.0)	8.5 (47.3)	4.5 (40.1)	11.3 (52.3)
Mean daily minimum °C (°F)	−2.1 (28.2)	−0.7 (30.7)	0.7 (33.3)	5.2 (41.4)	9.6 (49.3)	12.5 (54.5)	13.6 (56.5)	14.2 (57.6)	11.0 (51.8)	7.9 (46.2)	5.1 (41.2)	1.1 (34.0)	6.5 (43.7)
Average precipitation mm (inches)	120 (4.7)	91 (3.6)	74 (2.9)	65 (2.6)	64 (2.5)	64 (2.5)	40 (1.6)	34 (1.3)	62 (2.4)	102 (4.0)	121 (4.8)	131 (5.2)	968 (38.1)
Source: Climate guide of Bulgaria (temperature 1931–1970; precipitation 1931–1985)

The winds are predominantly northern. Along the coastline the winds flow from the north in November – March, from the east in April – August and from the north-east in September – October. The sea breeze causes the high frequency of eastern winds in summer. In the interior the predominant wind direction is more varied with northern winds being the most frequent in January – March and in October.

The annual precipitation is high, reaching in some areas above 1,000 millimetres (39 in). Along the coast rainfall is under the influence of the Mediterranean and is characterised with a winter maximum while the higher regions of Strandzha also have a second maximum in May – June as a result of the continental climate. In the interior rainfall is higher and influenced by the cold northern and north-eastern winds. There is no natural protection to the north which often results in abrupt temperature falls.

Strandzha has a significant potential for climate therapy. Due to the healthy climate along the coastline combined with sandy beaches, Ahtopol was designated a climatic sea resort of national importance and Sinemorets a climatic sea resort of local importance.

== Municipality ==
Malko Tarnovo is the seat of Malko Tarnovo municipality, part of Burgas Province. It includes the following 14 localities:

- Bliznak
- Brashlyan
- Byala Voda
- Evrenozovo
- Gramatikovo
- Kalovo
- Malko Tarnovo
- Mladezhko
- Slivarovo
- Stoilovo
- Vizitsa
- Zabernovo
- Zvezdets

== Gallery ==
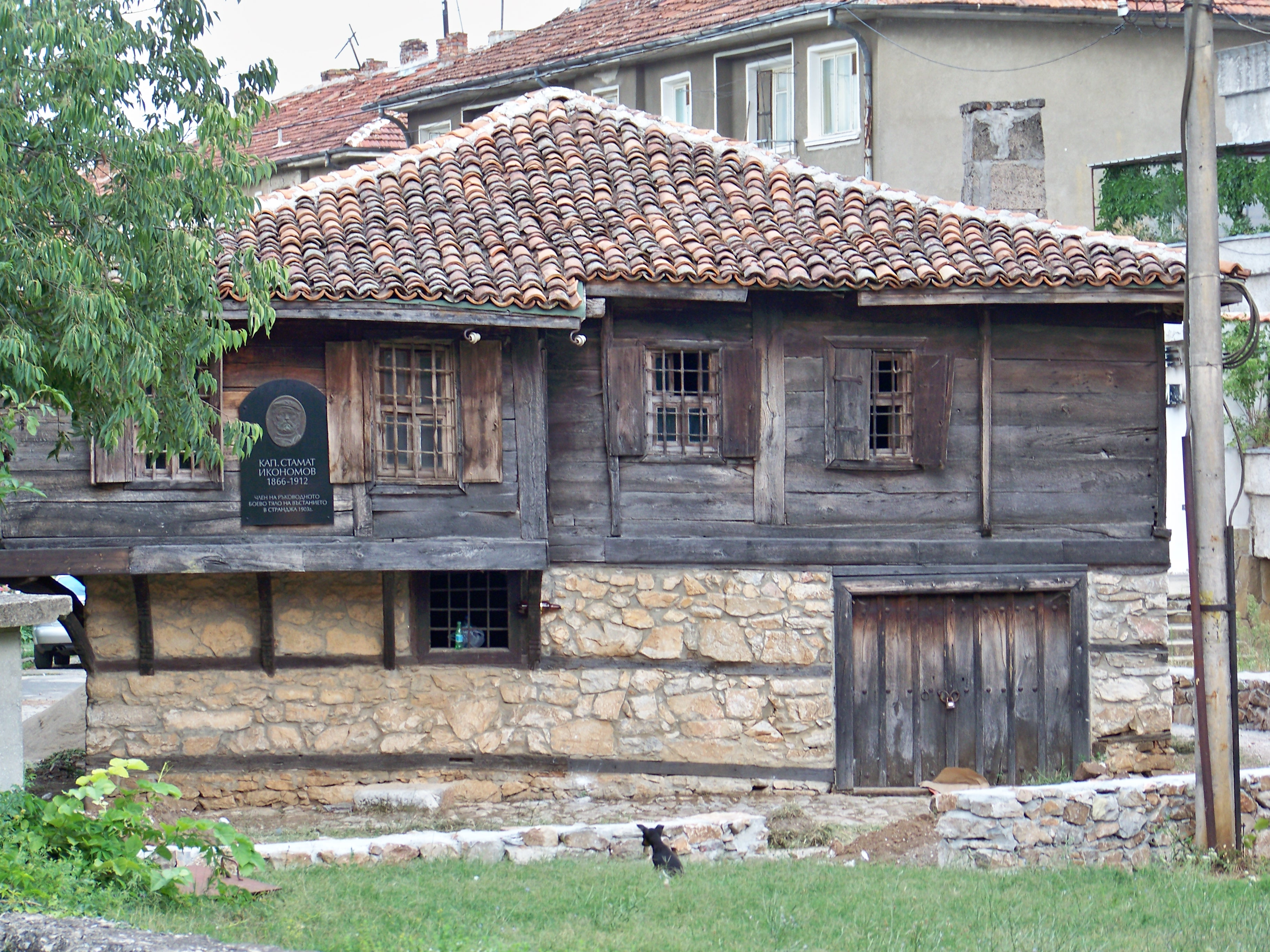

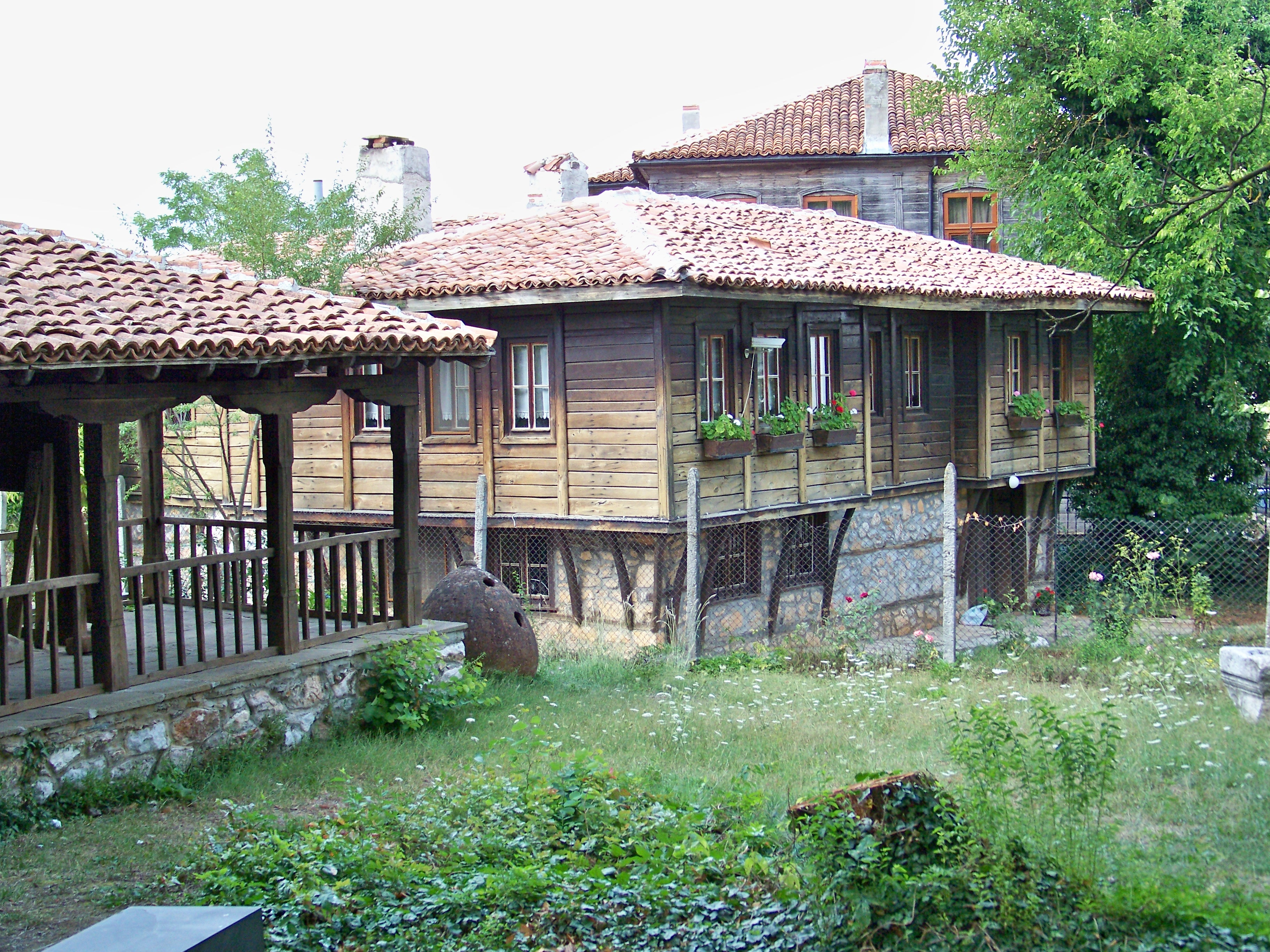

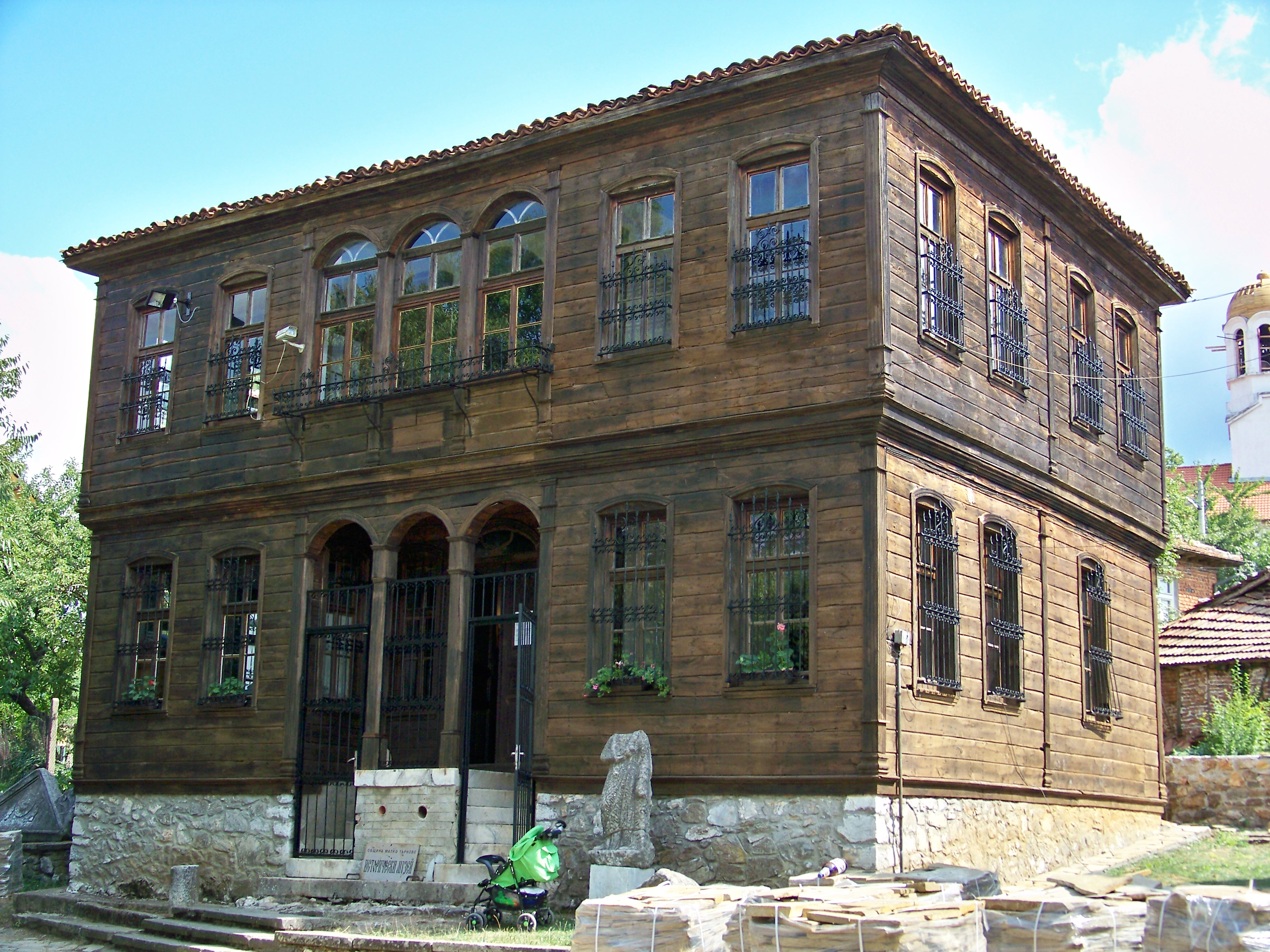

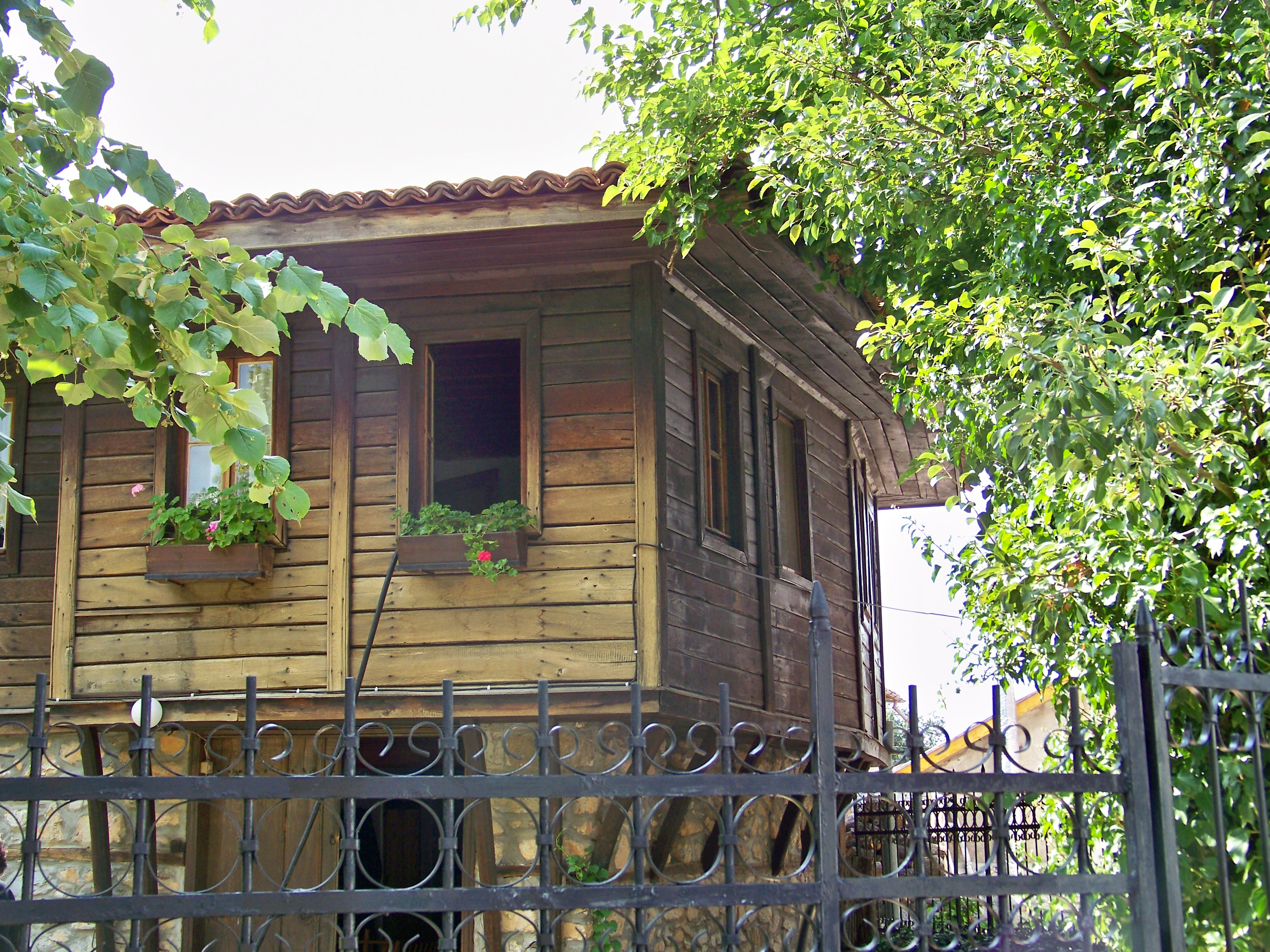

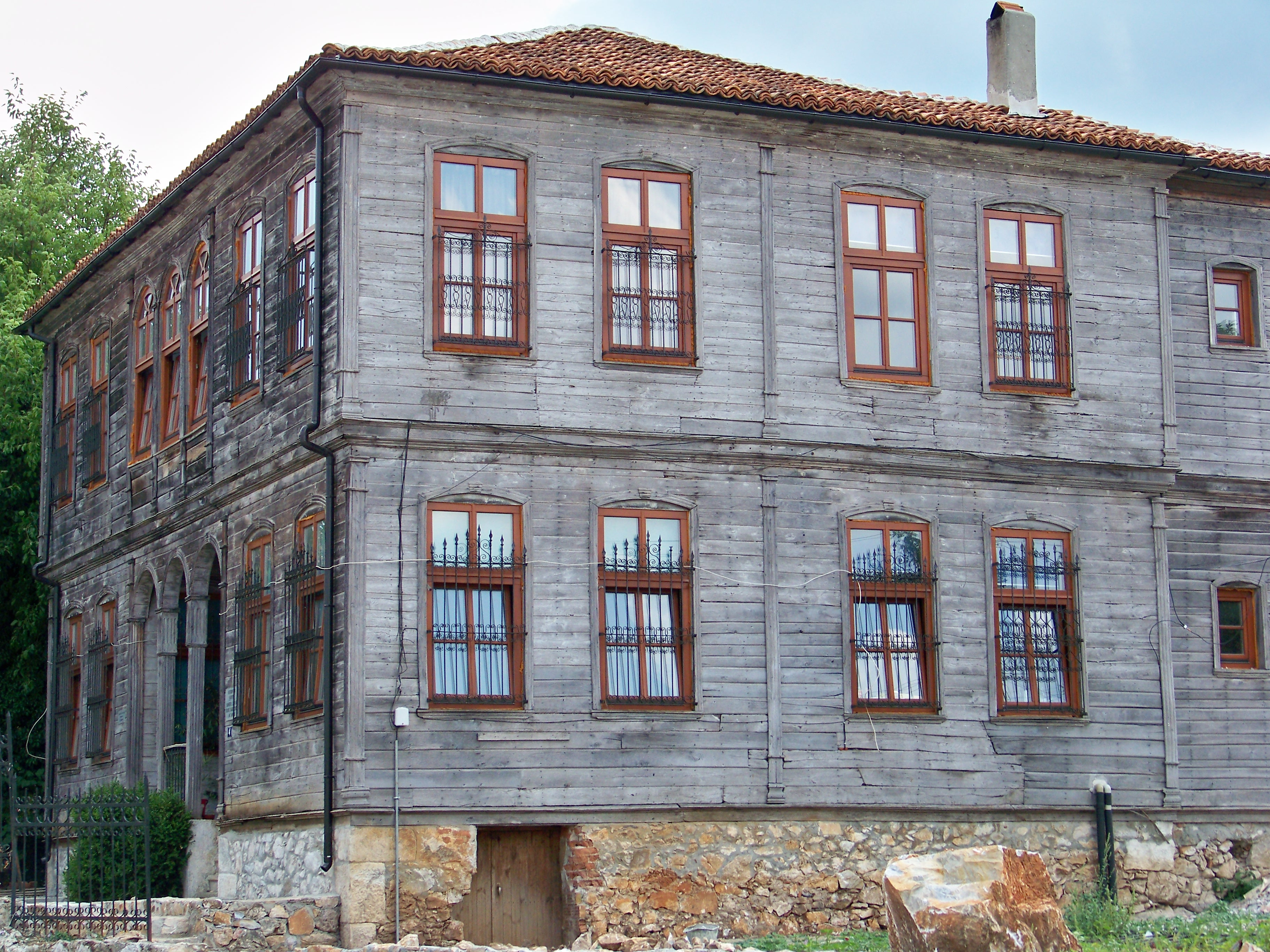
