= Veleka River =

River in Bulgaria

Veleka
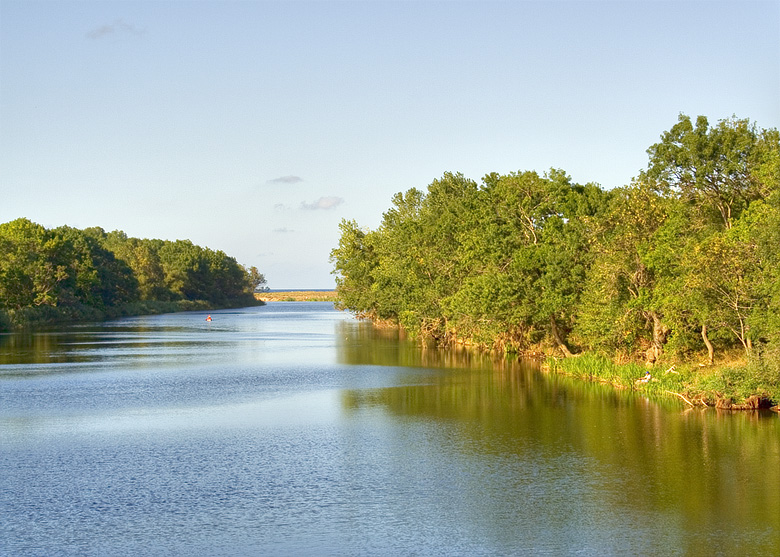

Location
- Country: Bulgaria, Turkey

Physical characteristics
- Source
  - location: Strandzha mountains, Turkey
  - coordinates: 42°3′32.04″N 27°13′9.12″E
  - elevation: 664 m (2,178 ft)
- Mouth
  - location: Black Sea, at Sinemorets, Bulgaria
  - coordinates: 42°4′9.84″N 27°58′5.88″E
- Length: 147 km (91 mi)
- Basin size: 995 km^{2} (384 sq mi)

The Veleka (Bulgarian: Велека [vɛˈlɛkɐ], Turkish: Kocadere [koˈd͡ʒadeɾe]) is a river in the very southeast of Bulgaria, as well as the very northeast of European Turkey. It is 147 km long, of which 108 km lie in Bulgaria and 25 km are in Turkey. It flows into the Black Sea at the Bulgarian village of Sinemorets. Veleka Ridge on Livingston Island in the South Shetland Islands, Antarctica is named after the river.

== Geography ==
=== Course ===
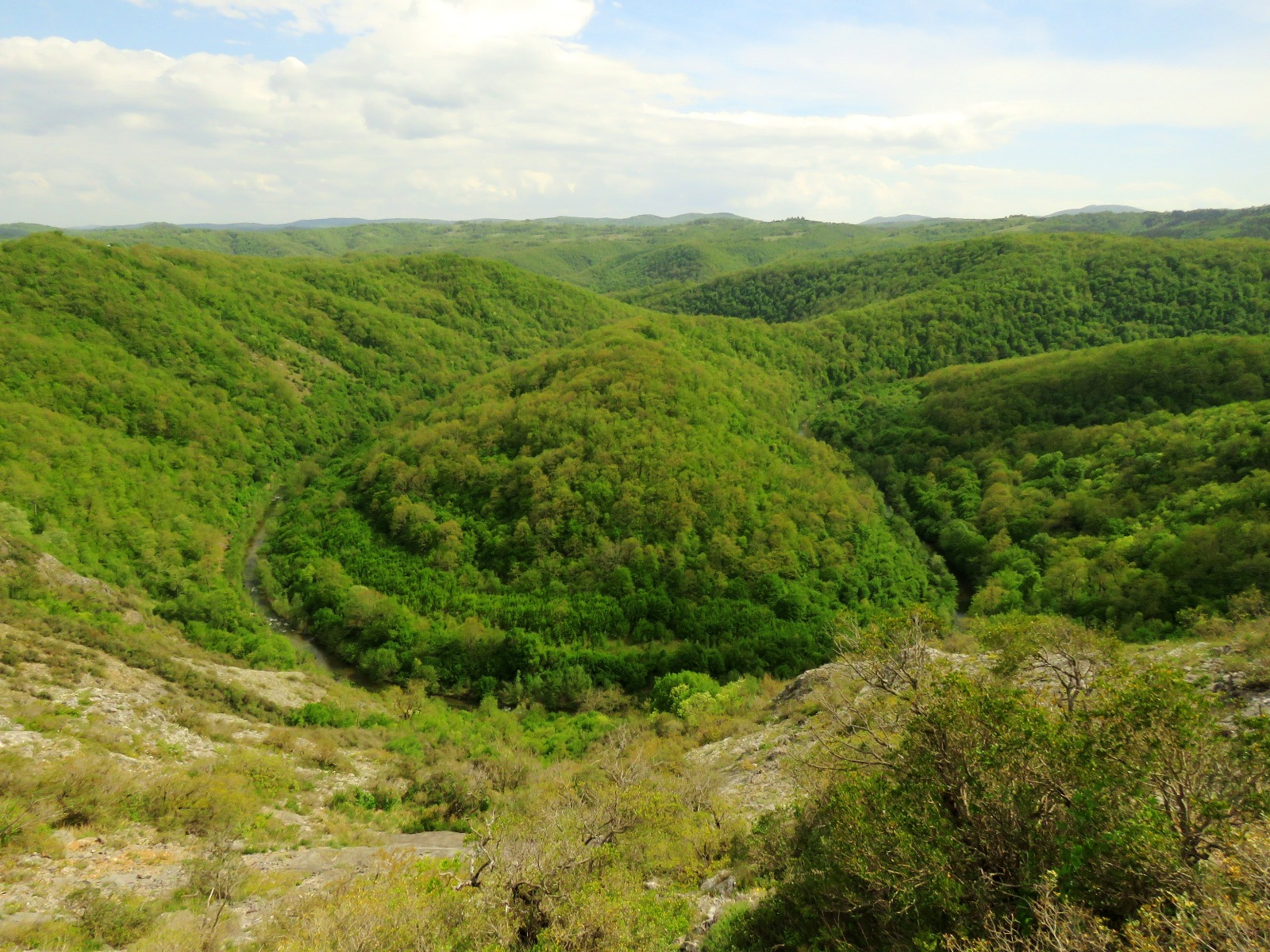
Meanders of the Veleka

The Veleka takes its source at an altitude of 664 m from several karst springs in the Turkish part of the Strandzha (İstranca) mountain range some 3 km southwest of the Turkish village of Ahlatlı and 5 km southeast of the Bulgarian village of Belevren. It flows in a deep forested valley, forming a large arc jutting southwards. About 3 km north of the Turkish village of Çaalayık the river reaches Bulgaria and serves as the border between the two countries for about 2 km. At the mouth of its left tributary, the Bostanlık at 340 m asl, the Veleka enters entirely Bulgarian territory for the rest of its course.

For the first 5 km on Bulgarian territory the flows north, and then bends in general eastern direction up to its mouth. In its upper reaches, up to the bridge if the first class I-9 road, the Veleka flows in a deep narrow valley with a very high longitudinal gradient of up to 33‰. The slopes of the river banks are steep, reaching up to 50°, and are entirely forested with tall stands of oaks, maples and other deciduous trees. Downstream from the bridge, the river curves strongly, forming a succession of strongly pronounced meanders. The width of the river channel at that section is about 20 m; the depth is about one meter. The bottom is sandy with occasional large stones.

The features of the valley changes towards the mouth of the tributary the Mladezhka reka, widening significantly to 800 m. The height of the slopes and their gradient decrease markedly to 25–30°. The forest cover decreases to 50%, with the remainder of the land under cultivation. The riverside meadows reach width of up to 150 m. The longitudinal gradient falls to 2‰, while the river channel widens to about 80 m. The bottom in that section consists of mainly coarse gravel and sand.

Downstream to the confluence with the right tributary Aydere, the valley of the Veleka narrows again to about 300 m. Towards the village of Kosti the valley's cross profile becomes trapezoidal with a bottom width of over 600 m, entirely covered with meadows. The width of the river averages 10–12 m and its depth is about two meters in average. The riverbed is sandy.

In the vicinity of the village of Brodilovo the Veleka valley widens up to 1200 m. The slopes are low, up to 30–50 m, and overgrown with low-lying forests. The depth increases to about 2.5 m. The influence of the sea becomes more pronounced, the water flow becomes very slow and any rapids disappear. The longitudinal gradient of the river is from 1.0–1.80‰. The slopes are low, with a gradient of 20–30°, covered with low-stemmed forests and arable lands. After the confluence of the tributary Selmata, the valley changes its character, widening to about 1000 m, with the gradient and the height of the slopes decreasing rapidly. The width of the river in that section is almost constant to an average of 8–10 m; the depth is 2–4 m; the riverbed consists of clay and sand. At its mouth, the Veleka is 50 m wide and 8–10 m deep. It forms a spit before flowing into the Black Sea at the village of Sinemorets, some 4.5 km south of the town of Ahtopol.

=== Basin and hydrology ===
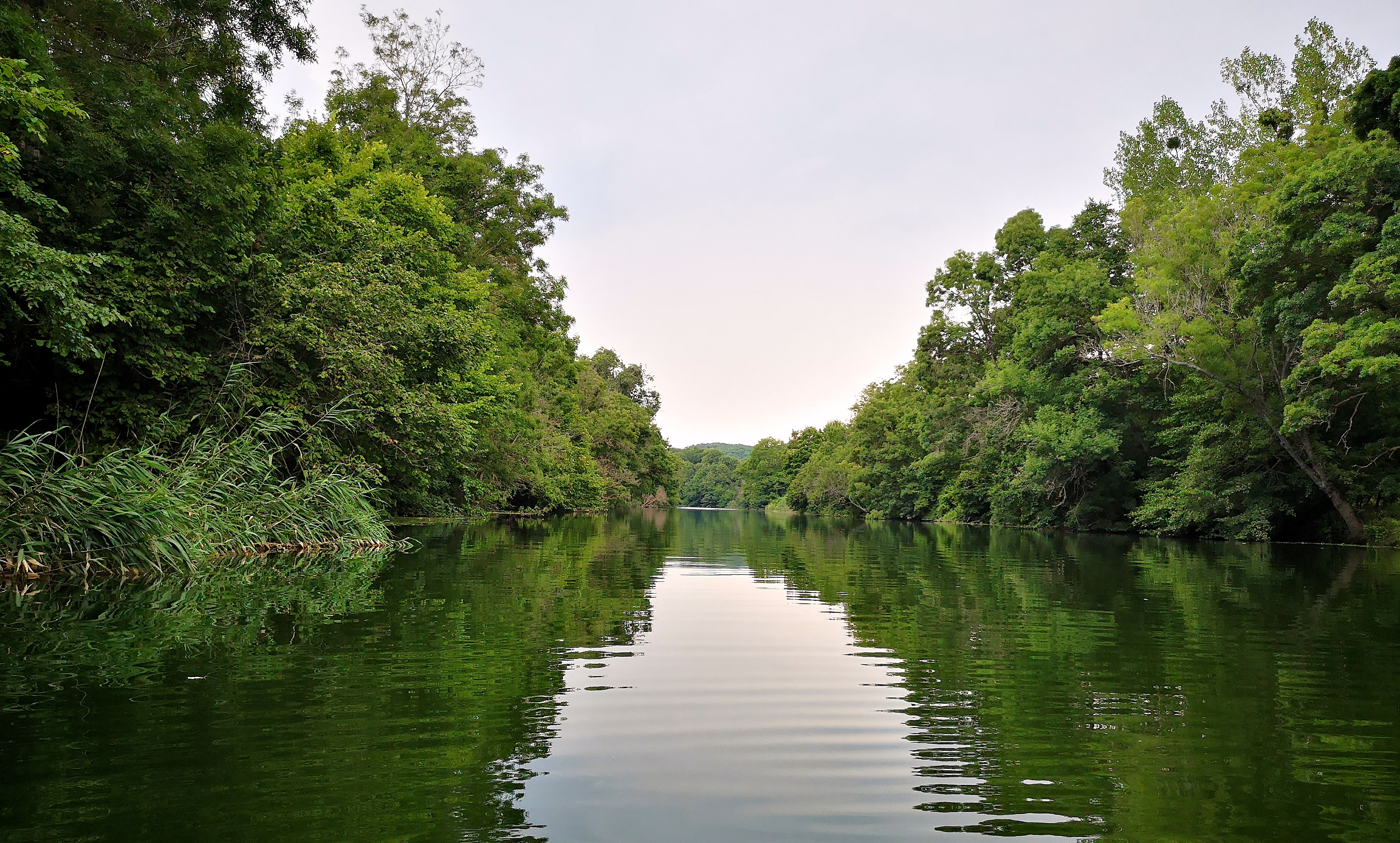
The lower course of the Veleka

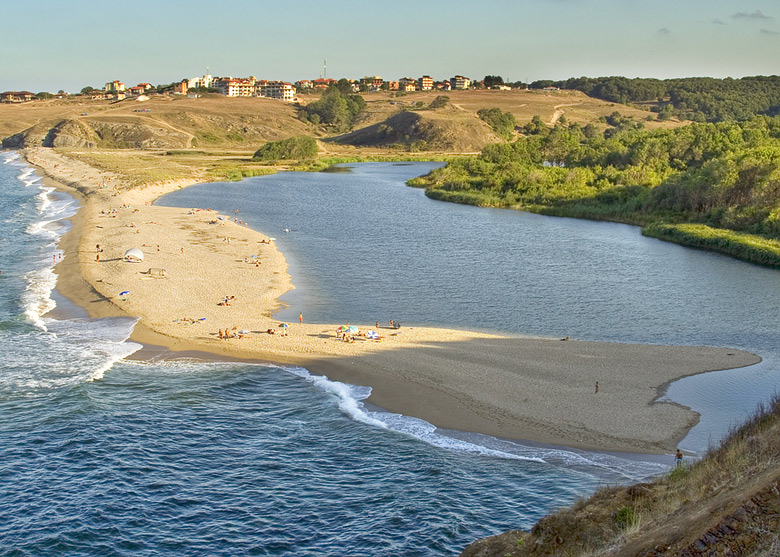
The estuary of the Veleka. Longshore drift has led to sediment deposition which has led to the formation of a spit. Sinemorets, Bulgaria

The Veleka drainage basin covers a territory of 995 km^{2}, of which 792 km^{2} are in Bulgaria. To the northwest and the north along the Bosna Ridge it borders the basins of the Fakiyska reka, the Izvorska reka, the Ropotamo, the Dyavolska reka and the Karaagach; to the southwest along the crest of the Strandzha it shares a small boundary with the Maritsa drainage of the Aegean Sea; to the south it borders the basin of the Rezovska reka. The main tributaries are the Mladezhka reka (40 km, left) and the Aydere or Mechi Dol (26 km, right). About 60% of the river basin is forested.

The Veleka has a predominantly rain feed with typical Mediterranean features with high water in February and low water in August–September. The average annual discharge is 9.41 m^{3}/s at the bridge of the second class II-99 road Tsarevo–Malko Tarnovo south of Gramatikovo in its middle course. The National Institute of Meteorology and Hydrology maintains a hydrological station on the Veleka south of the village of Zvezdets.

== Ecology ==
The whole river basin within Bulgaria is part of Strandzha Nature Park, the largest protected territory in the country, that includes the nature reserves of Silkosiya and Srednoka, as well as the protected areas Paroria and Mouth of the Veleka River.

Situated on the Via Pontica bird migration route, the latter is home to a number of protected bird species, including red-footed falcon, Eurasian eagle-owl, pygmy cormorant, black-necked grebe, common shelduck, sandwich tern, black-headed gull, as well as wintering populations of mute swan, red-breasted goose, white-headed duck, red-crested pochard, European shag, etc. The lower Veleka is among the few nestling spots of the yelkouan shearwater in Bulgaria.

The Veleka is among the northernmost locations of coexistence of the European pond turtle and the Balkan terrapin.

The waters of the Veleka are rich in flora and fauna, with at least 32 species of freshwater and brackish fish present, including endangered taxa, such as Black Sea roach, Pontic shad, Azov shad, European eel and three-spined stickleback, as well as endemic species shared with a few neighbouring Black Sea river basins, including Pontic spined loach, Black Sea bleak, Bulgarian minnow, Thracian spirlin and Bulgarian barbel. Other common fish species are river trout, common carp, European bitterling, European chub, common minnow, common gudgeon, racer goby, etc.

== Settlements and economy ==
The Veleka flows in Burgas Province of Bulgaria and Kırklareli Province of Turkey. Despite its significant length, there are only two settlements along its course in Bulgaria, the villages of Kosti and Brodilovo in Tsarevo Municipality. Due to the lack of major industrial enterprises, its waters are clear; they are utilized for irrigation in the valley widenings. The lowermost 8 km are navigable for small vessels. While there are no paved roads running in parallel to the river banks, the Veleka is crossed by two important transport arteries serving eastern Bulgaria and the Bulgarian Black Sea Coast, the first class I-9 road Durankulak–Varna, Bulgaria–Burgas–Malko Tarnovo and the second class II-99 road Burgas–Malko Tarnovo.

Nestled in one of the Veleka's meanders north of the villages of Stoilovo lies the historic area of Petrova Niva, where in 1903 a group of Bulgarian Internal Macedonian-Adrianople Revolutionary Organization delegates announced the outbreak of the Preobrazhenie Uprising against the Ottoman Empire and proclaimed the Strandzha Commune.

== Gallery ==
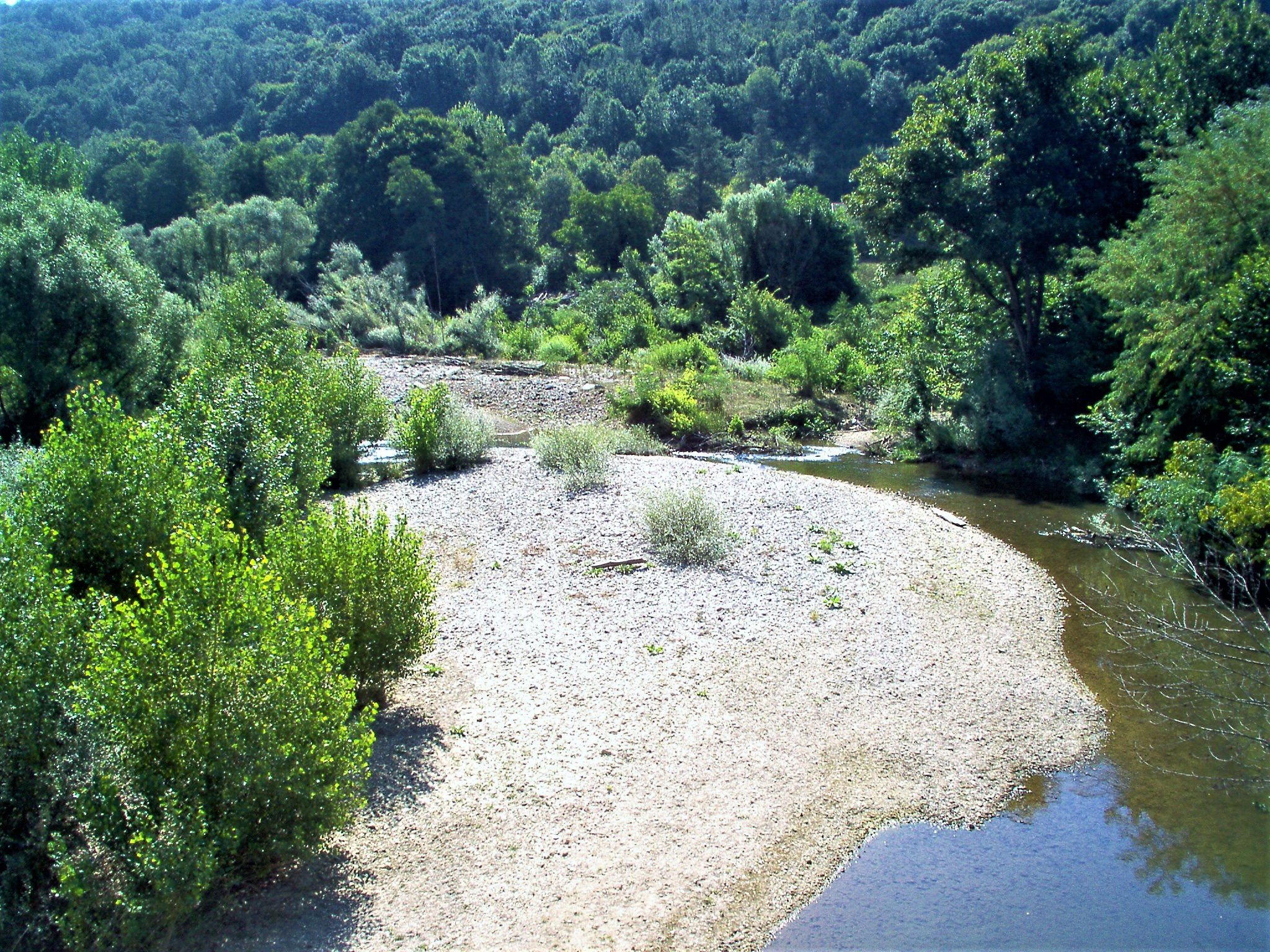
The Veleka

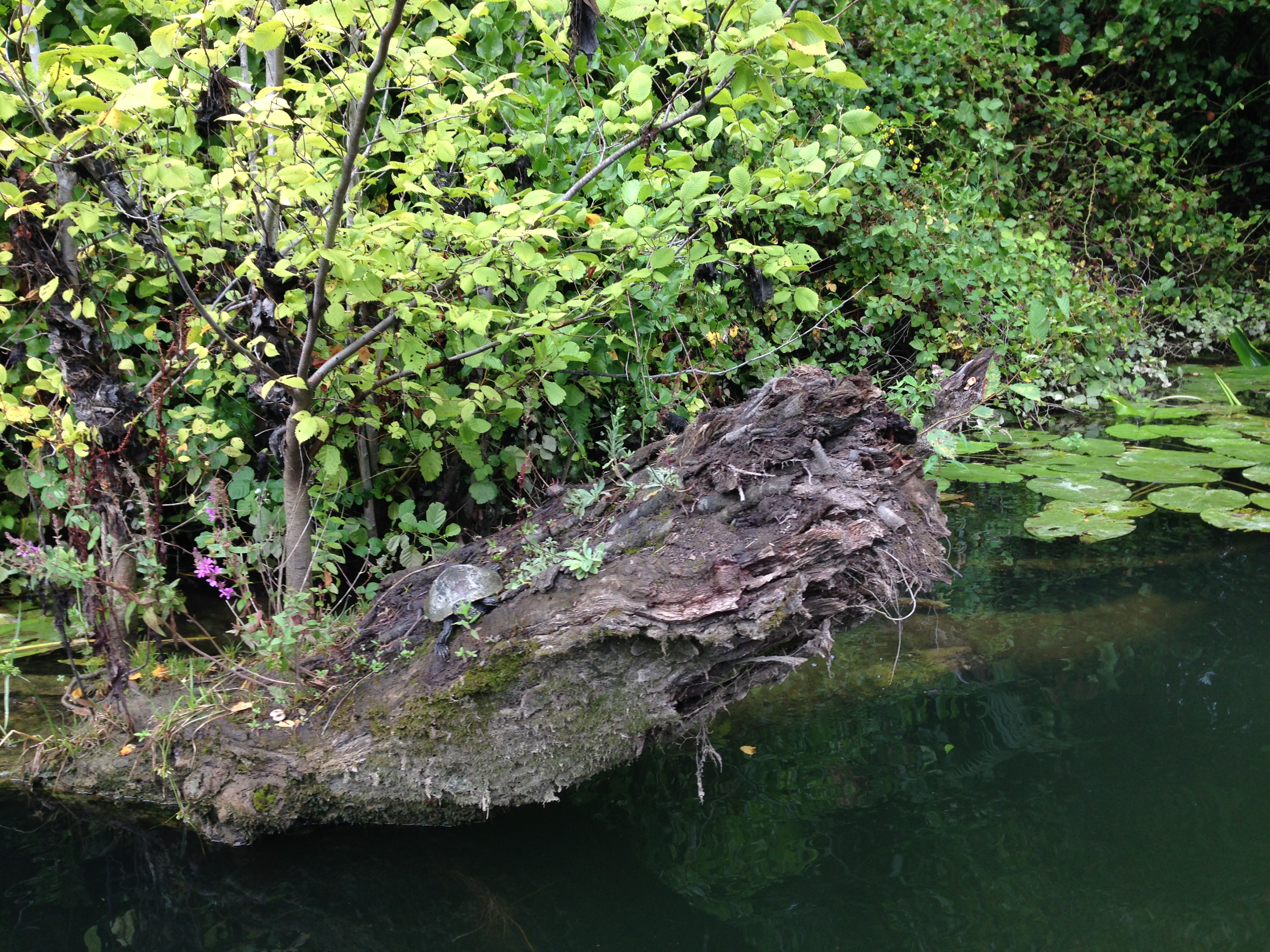
Vegetation on the river banks

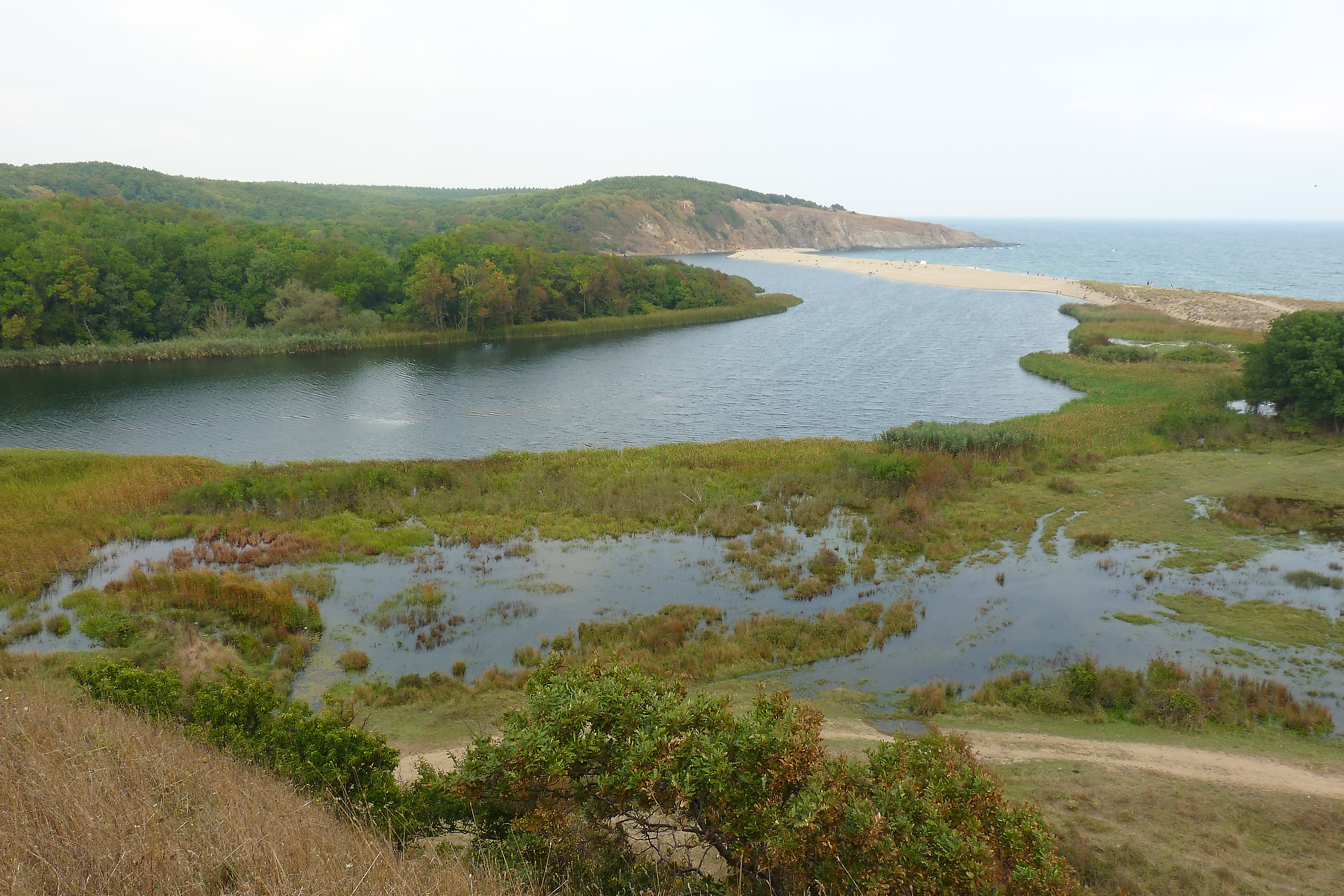
The Veleka before its mouth

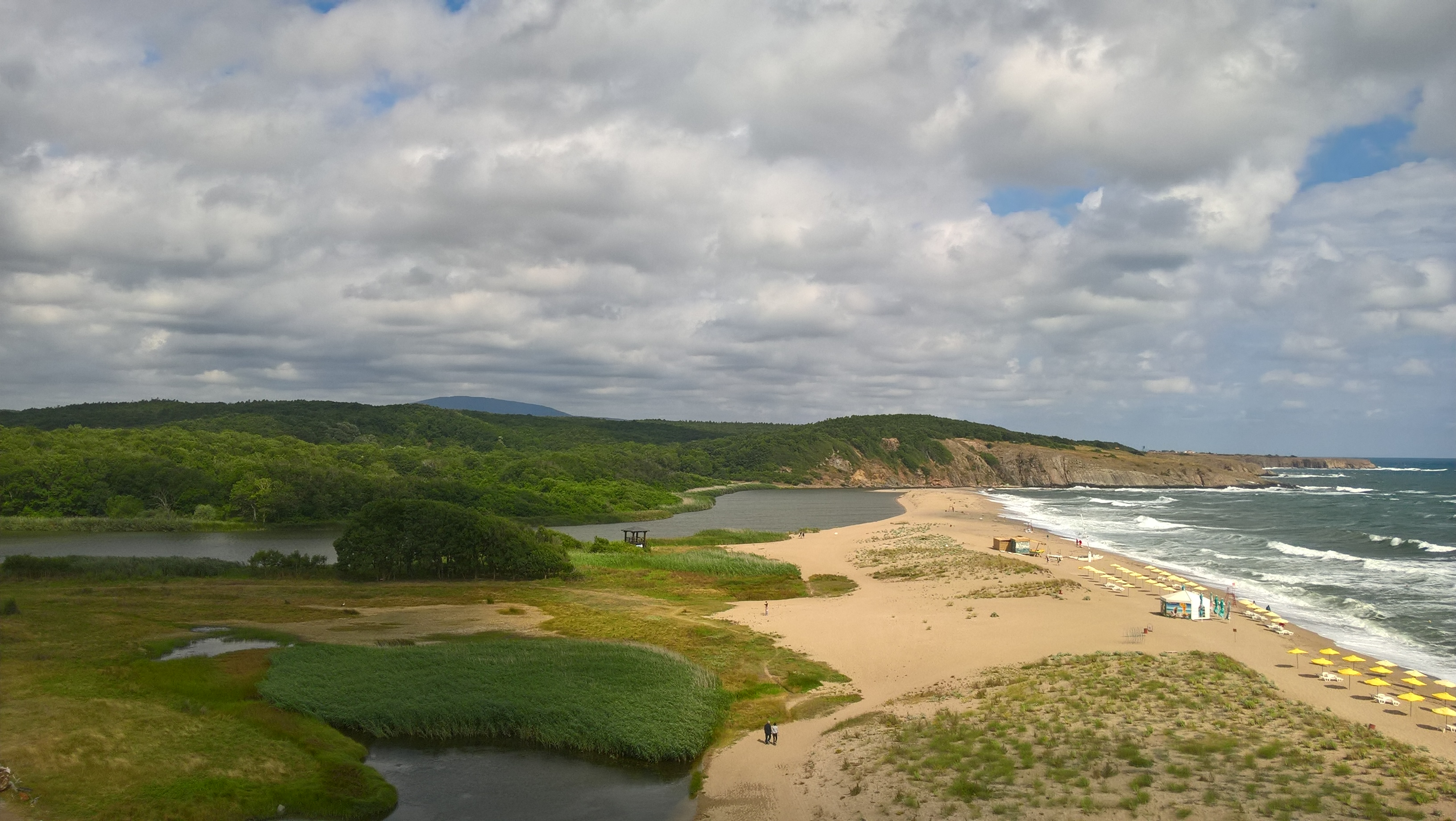
Mouth of the Veleka
