= Bulgarian minnow =

Conservation status
- Endangered (IUCN 3.1)

Scientific classification
- Kingdom: Animalia
- Phylum: Chordata
- Class: Actinopterygii
- Order: Cypriniformes
- Family: Leuciscidae
- Subfamily: Phoxininae
- Genus: Phoxinus
- Species: P. strandjae

Binomial name
- Phoxinus strandjae Drensky, 1926

Species of fish

The Bulgarian minnow (Phoxinus strandjae) is a species of freshwater ray-finned fish belonging to the family Leuciscidae, which includes the daces, minnows and related fishes. This fish is endemic to southeastern Europe and Anatolia.

== Taxonomy ==
The Bulgarian minnow was first formally described in 1926 as the subspecies strandjae of the "common minnow" Phoxinus phoxinus by the Bulgarian zoologist Pencho Drensky, with its type locality given as the Mladezhka reka in the Veleka River drainage in Bulgaria at 42°05'31"N, 27°23'47"E. Studies of the "common minnow" in the late 20th and 21st centuries have shown that what had been thought to be a single widespread Palearctic species was, in fact, a species complex. This means that this taxon is now considered to be a valid species within the genus Phoxinus, the only genus in the monotypic subfamily Phoxininae of the family Leuciscidae.

== Etymology ==
The Bulgarian minnow belongs to the genus Phoxinus. This name is derived from the Greek phoxinos, meaning "small fishes". In 1553, Pierre Belon used it to refer to the fishes known as minnows in English, and Carl Linnaeus used it as the specific name of a fish in 1758, which Constantine Samuel Rafinesque applied tautologically to the genus of minnows in 1820, its only species being Phoxinus phoxinus. The specific name, strandjae, refers to the Strandzha mountain massif in which the type locality is located.

== Description ==
The Bulgarian minnow is identified from the other European minnows in the genus Phoxinus by the anal fin origin being located below or behind the base of last dorsal fin ray. The maximum standard length of the Bulgarian minnow is 6.7 cm (2.6 in).

== Distribution and habitat ==
The Bulgarian minnow is endemic to southeastern Europe and western Asia, where it is found in the coastal streams of Bulgaria from the Prodaviya River basin south to the Biga Peninsula, on the Sea of Marmara coast of Anatolia, and east to the Filyos River drainage. It inhabist small streams with gravel or stone substrates with clear, well oxygenated water.
