= Bliznak =

Bliznak is a South Slavic toponym that may refer to:

- Bliznak, Malko Tarnovo, in Bulgaria
- Bliznak (Žagubica), in Serbia
