= Mladezhka reka =

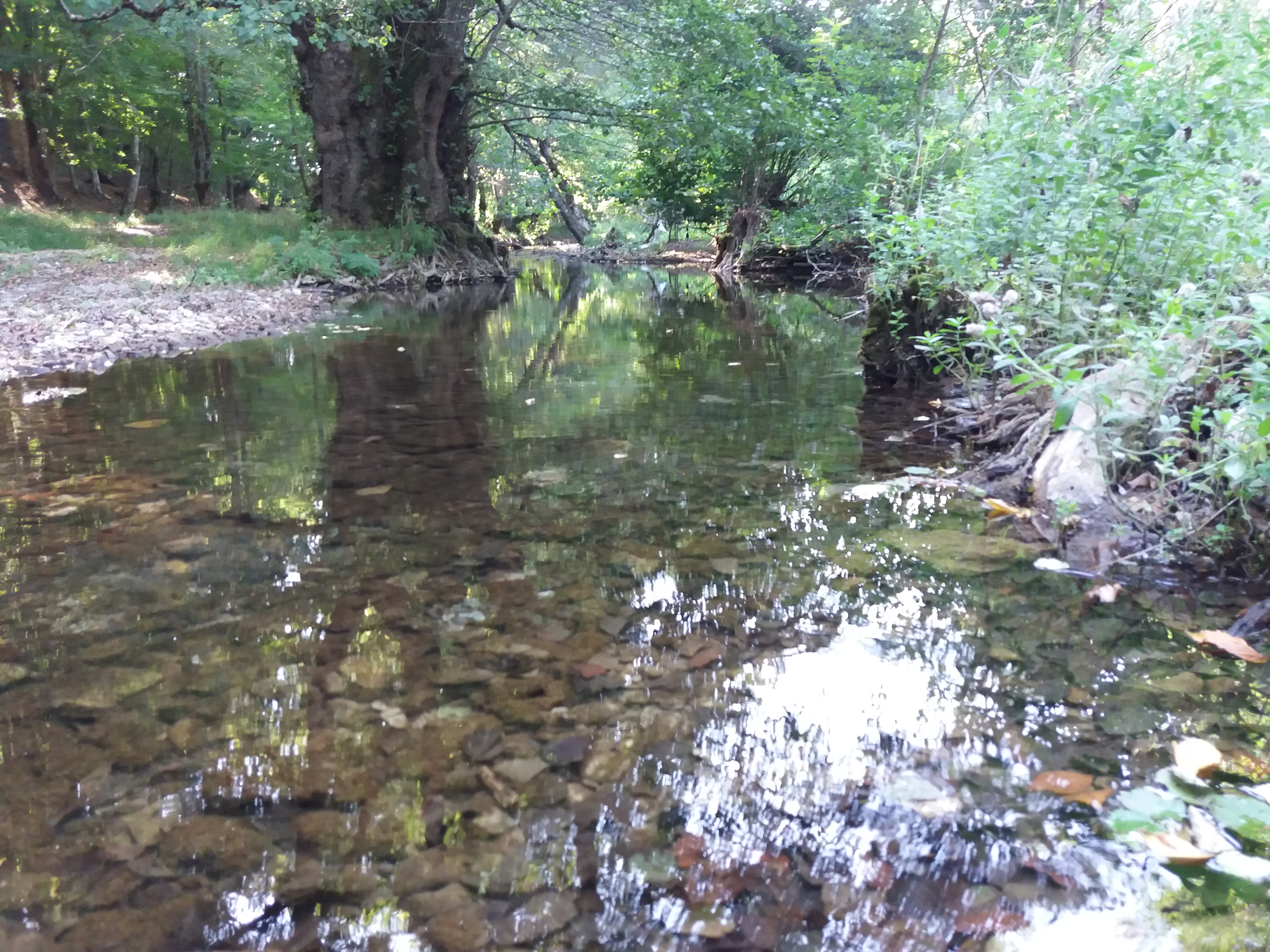

Location
- Country: Bulgaria

Physical characteristics
- Source
  - location: Strandzha
  - coordinates: 42°6′0″N 27°16′32.16″E
  - elevation: 486 m (1,594 ft)
- Mouth
  - location: Veleka
  - coordinates: 42°3′56.16″N 27°33′10.08″E
  - elevation: 96 m (315 ft)
- Length: 40 km (25 mi)
- Basin size: 232 km^{2} (90 sq mi)

Basin features
- Progression: Veleka → Black Sea

The Mladezhka reka (Bulgarian: Младежка река) is a 40 km long river in southeastern Bulgaria, a left tributary of the Veleka, which flows into the Black Sea.

The river takes its source at an altitude of 486 m some 800 m southeast of the summit of Batak Cheshma (509 m) on the Bulgaria–Turkey border. Along its whole course it flows in a deep densely forested valley, initially in direction northeast until the village of Mladezhko and then in direction southeast until its mouth. The Mladezhka reka flows into the Veleka at an altitude of 96 m about 2 m east of the historic locality of Petrova Niva.

Its drainage basin covers a territory of 232 km^{2}, or 23.3% of the Veleka's total. The river has typically Mediterranean characteristics with high water in February and low water in August. The average flow at the crossing of the first class I-9 road is 1.01 m^{3}/s.

The Mladezhka reka flows entirely in Burgas Province. There is one settlement along its course, the village of Mladezhko in Malko Tarnovo Municipality. Its waters are among the cleanest in Bulgaria and are not diverted for economic purposes. Its whole valley is part of the Strandzha Nature Park and its lower course is located in the Paroria protected area, which sheltered an important monastic community in the 14th century during the Second Bulgarian Empire. The historic locality of Petrova Niva at the mouth of the Mladezhka reka was the starting point of the 1903 Bulgarian Ilinden–Preobrazhenie Uprising against the Ottoman Empire in the Strandzha region.

== Gallery ==
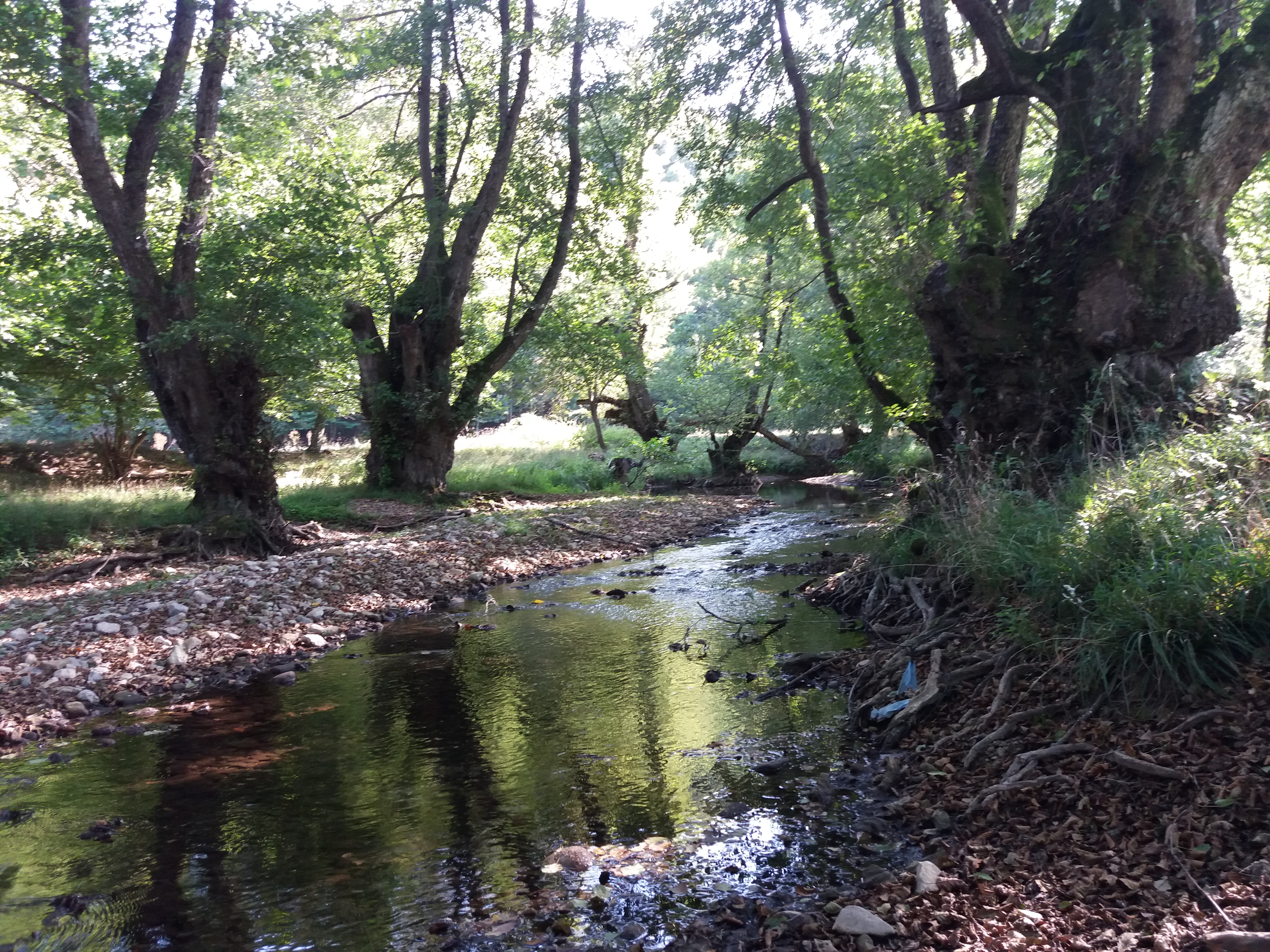

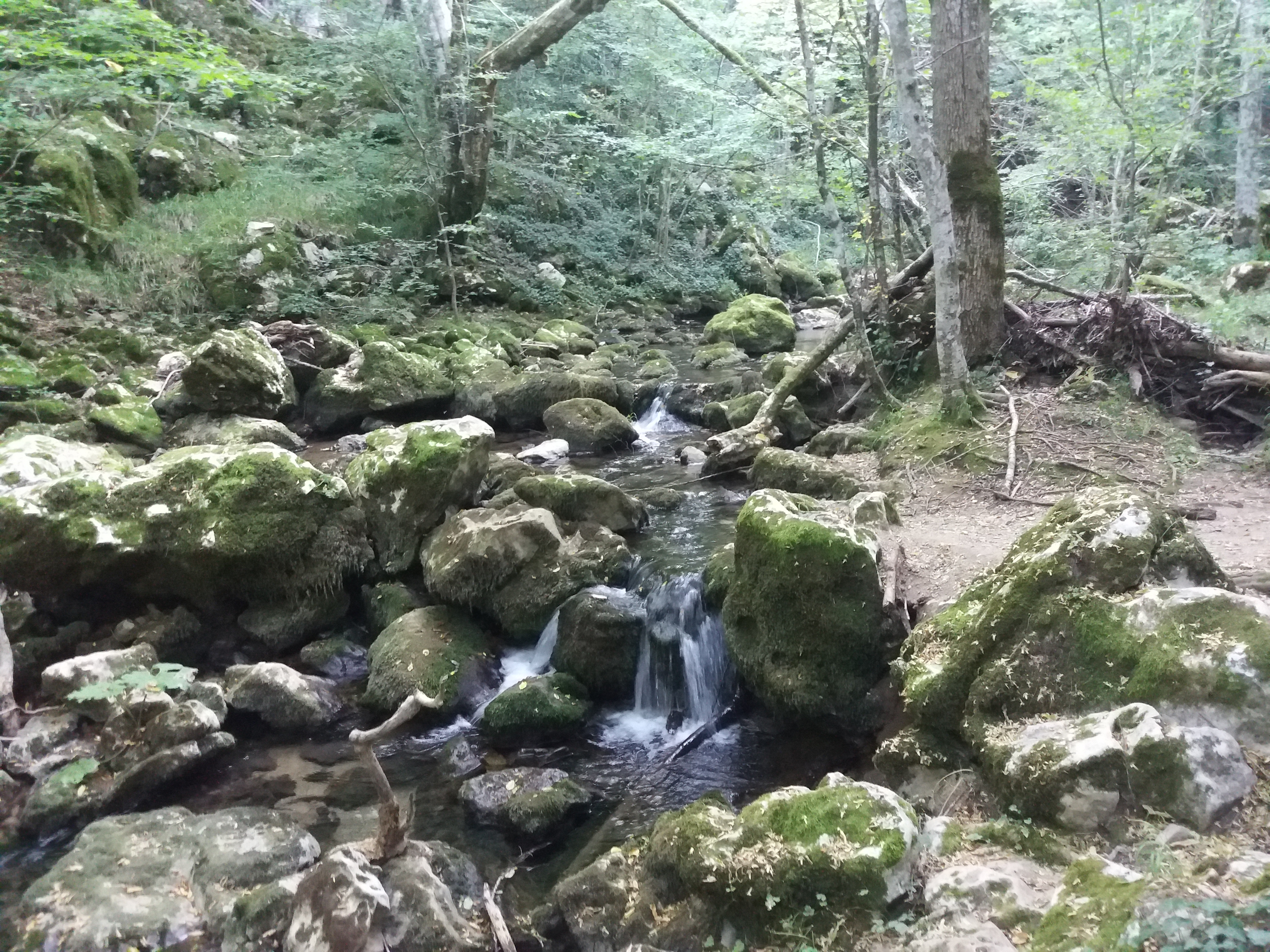

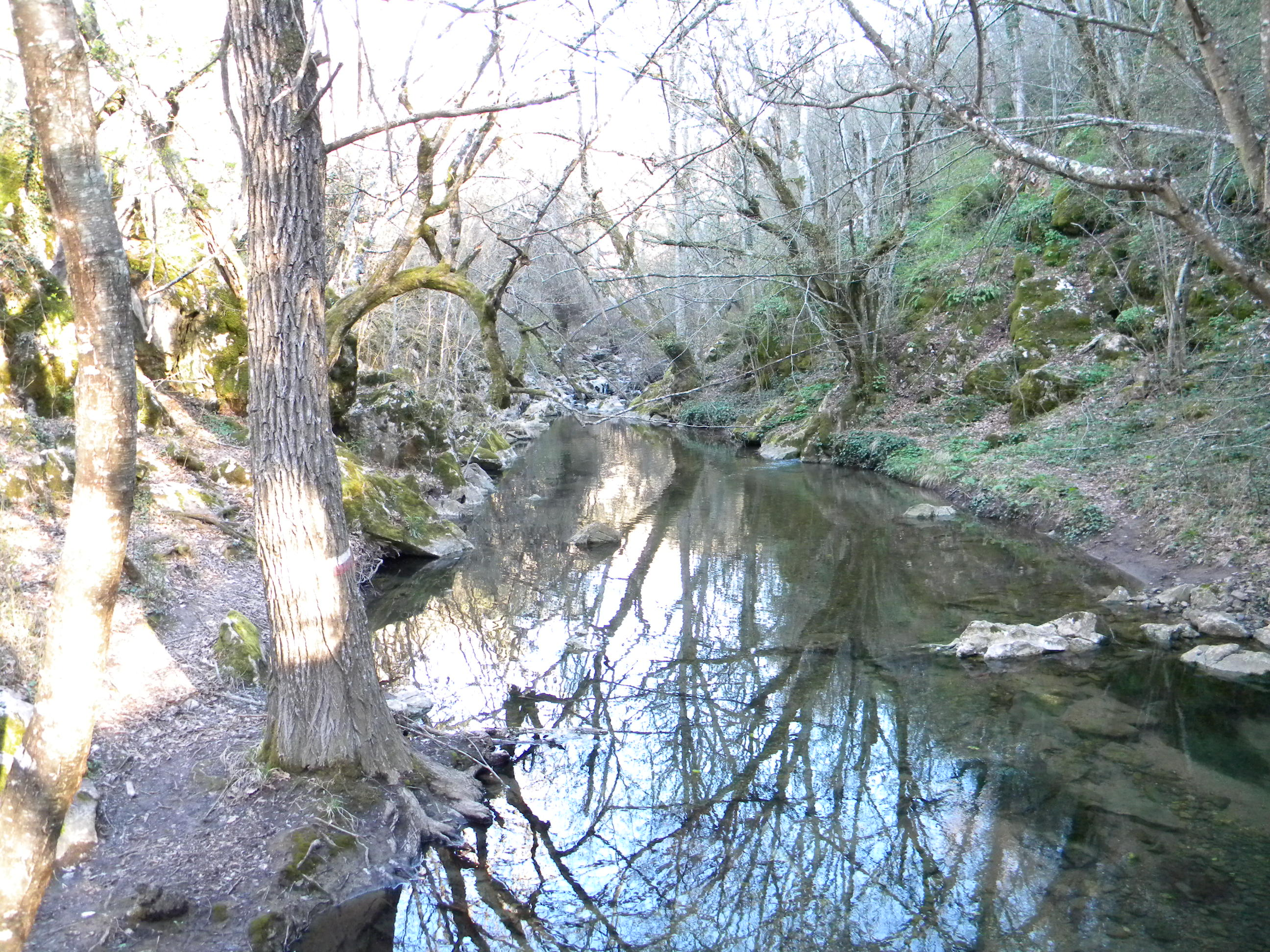
