= Karaagach (river) =

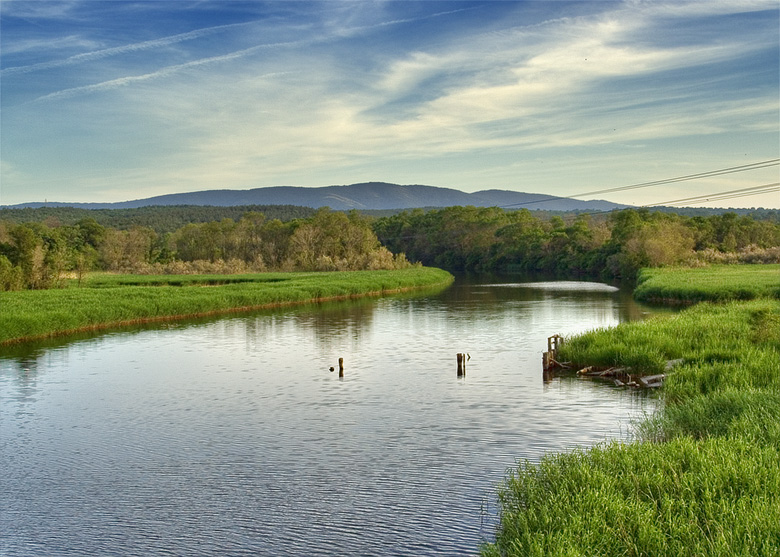

Location
- Country: Bulgaria

Physical characteristics
- Source
  - location: NE of Demira, Strandzha
  - coordinates: 42°9′51.12″N 27°35′17.16″E
  - elevation: 331 m (1,086 ft)
- Mouth
  - location: Black Sea
  - coordinates: 42°13′32.88″N 27°46′42.96″E
  - elevation: 0 m (0 ft)
- Length: 36 km (22 mi)
- Basin size: 182 km^{2} (70 sq mi)

The Karaagach (Bulgarian: Караагач), also known as Kitenska reka (Китенска река), is a 36 km long river in Burgas Province, southeastern Bulgaria. There are no settlements along its course. The river is rich in rare fish species and has varied flora.

The river takes its source under the name Stara Vizitsa at an altitude of 331 m, some 400 m northeast of the summit of Demira (424 m) in the Bosna Ridge of the Strandzha mountain range. Throughout most of its course the Karaagach flows in a deep forested valley. It initially flows in eastern direction, then takes a northeastern turn and after taking the waters from its left tributary Uzunchairska reka, it again heads east. It flows into the Black Sea in the southeastern part of the small Karaagach bay, at 800 m south of the town of Kiten on the territory of the Tsarevo Municipality. It forms a deep estuary which reaches depth of 11–14 metres (36–46 ft).

Its drainage basin covers a territory of 182 km^{2} and borders the drainage basins of the Dyavolska reka to the north and west, the Veleka to the south and southwest, and several small rivers flowing into the Black Sea to the east. The Karaagach has predominantly rain feed with high water in January–February and low water in August.

== Gallery ==
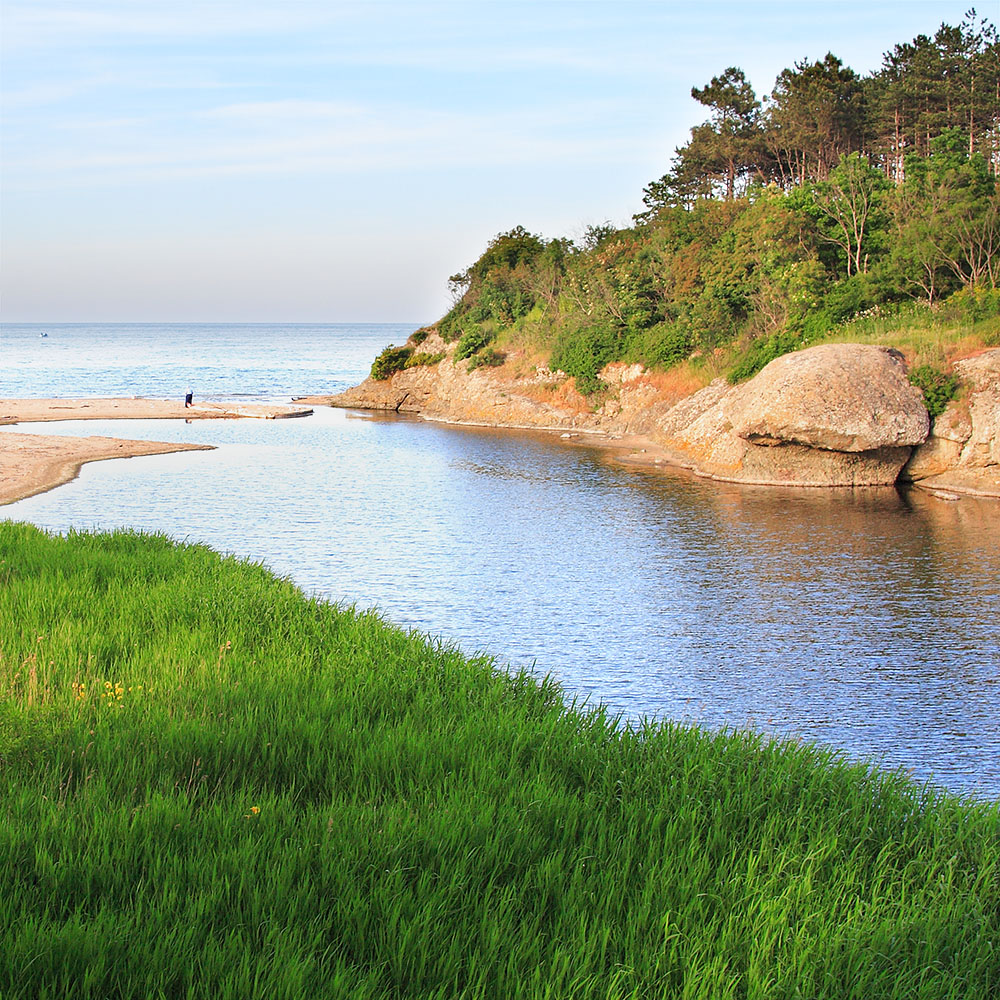

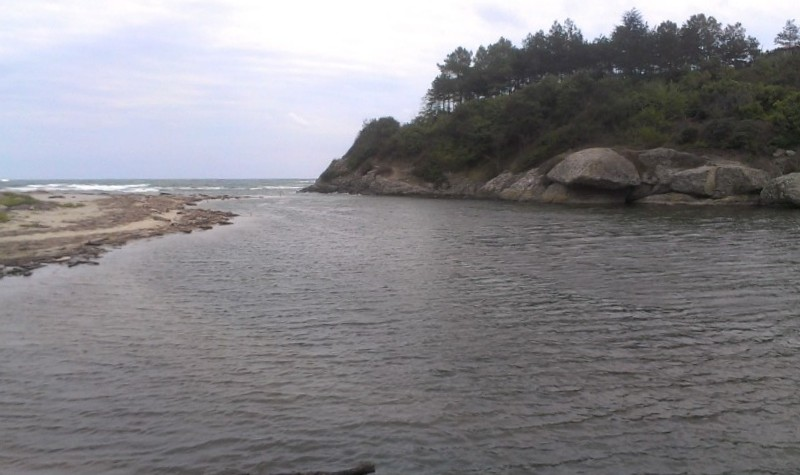

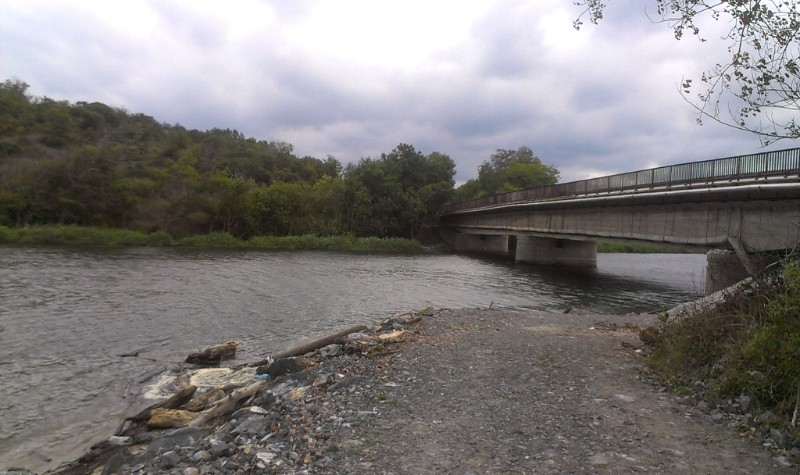
