= Silkosiya Reserve =

Nature reserve in southeastern Bulgaria

Silkosia Nature Reserve
- IUCN category Ia (strict nature reserve)
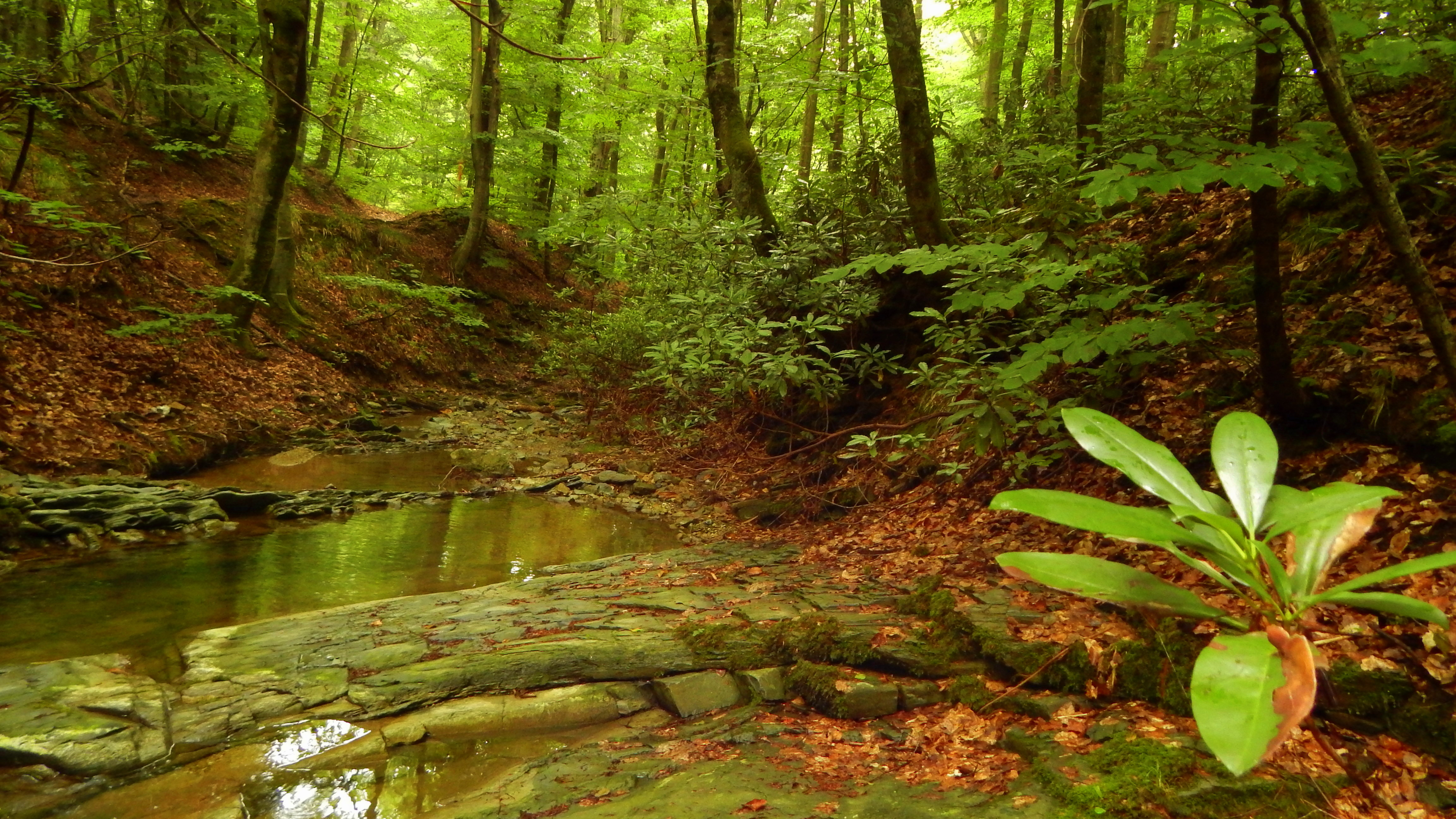

- Location within Bulgaria
- Location: Municipality of Tsarevo, Burgas Province, Bulgaria
- Nearest city: Tsarevo
- Coordinates: 42°04′59″N 27°45′15″E
- Area: 3.896 km^{2} (1.504 sq mi)
- Established: 1931
- Governing body: Ministry of Environment and Water

Silkosia (Bulgarian: Силкосия) is a nature reserve in Strandzha Nature Park, located in the homonymous mountain, southeastern Bulgaria. Its territory close to the villages Kosti and Balgari. Silkosia is the oldest reserve in the country, declared on 23 July 1931 in order to protect the evergreen bushes unique for Europe. It encompasses part of the Veleka river catchment area with a territory of 389.6 ha or 3.896 km^{2}. The terrain is various, in the lower parts there are predominantly swamp areas with typical Central European flora. The reserve encompasses territory between 100 and 250 m altitude and is thus among the lowest-lying nature reserves in the country.

== Flora ==
The variety of plant species is high and includes 260 vascular plant species on a territory of less than 4 km^{2}. Of them, 3 are endemic and 16 are relict species. There are specimen from different geographical latitudes which makes it interesting for the scientists. Plant inversion can be observed in the reserve. Usually, the beech trees are located in the higher and cooler areas, while the oak trees occupy the lower parts. In Silkosia it is the other way round: the oak forests are located higher in the mountain. Forests cover 97.9% of the total area of the reserve. The average age of the trees is 120–130 years, at places – over 200 years.

In the wet valley rare species such as the strandzhan periwinkle, laurel, caucausian blueberry, common yew can be observed. It is also the only place in Europe, where the wild medlar tree can be found. The most common flowers are the caucausian cowslip and the spring cyclamen which blossom in February and March.

== Fauna ==
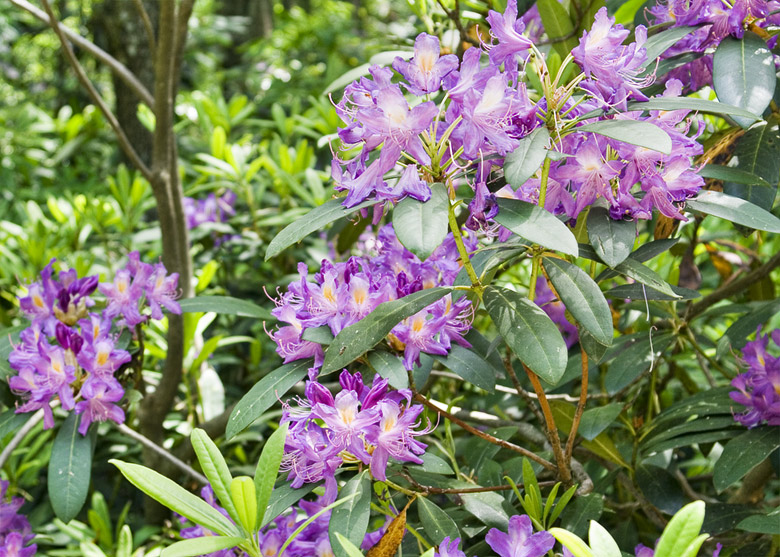
Strandzhan periwinkle in Silkosia.

The Silkosia reserve has rich wildlife. The most common amphibian species include the European green toad, European tree frog and the agile frog.

Typical reptilians in the reserve are the spur-thighed tortoise, Hermann's tortoise, slowworm and scheltopusik. There are also many species of snakes - Caspian whipsnake, Aesculapian snake, Blotched snake, and Montpellier snake among the others.

There are various bird species. The golden oriole, nightingale, Sardinian warbler, whitethroat, common blackbird, Eurasian jay, common chaffinch nest in the reserve, as well as different species of falcons, woodpeckers and many others.

Mammals include the wild cat, beech marten, European pine marten, gray wolf, wild boar and others.

== Sources ==
- Георгиев, Георги. Националните и природните паркове и резерватите в България. Гея-Либрис, София, 2004, с. 130 - 131 ISBN 954-300-028-X
