= Primorski Pass =

Mountain pass in Bulgaria

- Interactive map of Primorski Pass
- Elevation: 450 m (1,480 ft)
- Traversed by: Road

Third Approach
- Location: Bulgaria
- Range: Balkan Mountains
- Coordinates: 42°45′30″N 27°45′11″E

Primorski Pass, also called Obzor Pass, (Bulgarian: Приморски проход or Обзорски проход or Поморийски проход) is a mountain pass along the I-9 road in the Balkan Mountains in Bulgaria, near the town of Obzor. It connects Varna and Burgas. It is the easternmost pass in the Balkan Mountains, running near the water.
