= I-9 road (Bulgaria) =

Road in Bulgaria

Republic Road I-9
- Републикански път I-9
- I-9 road highlighted in orange

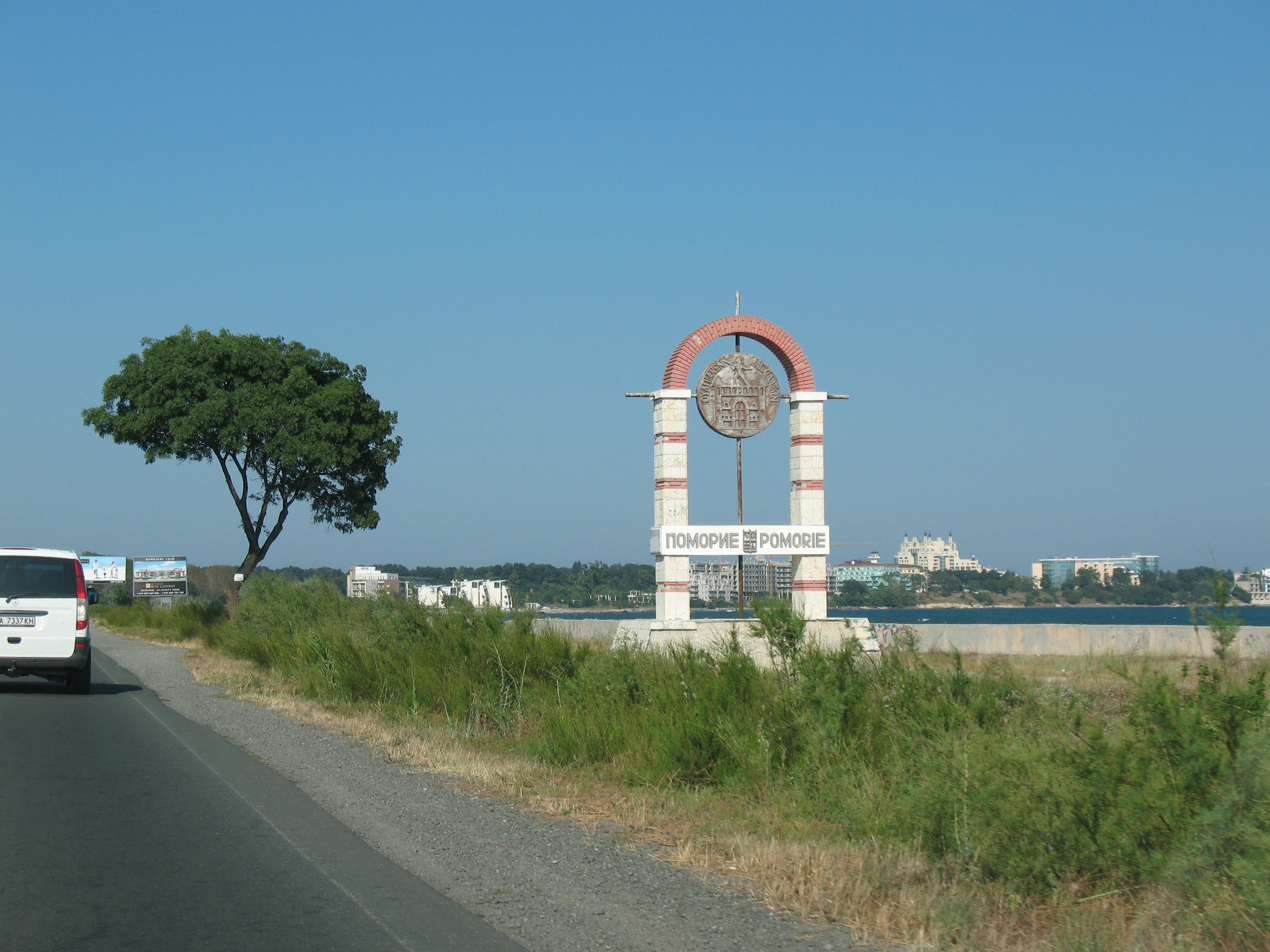
- I-9 road at Pomorie

Route information
- Length: 325.6 km (202.3 mi)

Major junctions
- From: Durankulak; (Romania)
- To: Malko Tarnovo; (Turkey)

Location
- Country: Bulgaria
- Major cities: Shabla, Kavarna, Balchik, Albena, Zlatni Pyasatsi, Varna, Byala, Obzor, Slanchev Bryag, Pomorie, Burgas

Highway system
- Highways in Bulgaria

Republican road I-9 (Bulgarian: Републикански път I-9) is a first class road in eastern Bulgaria, serving most of the Bulgarian Black Sea Coast. It runs between the village of Durankulak, at the border with Romania, and the Malko Tarnovo border crossing to Turkey in general direction north-south. The total length of the road is 325.6 km (202.3 mi). Throughout its entire length, road I-9 it is part of European route E87. In its southernmost section the road runs through Strandzha Nature Park. The road passes through the provinces of Dobrich, Varna and Burgas.

== Description ==
The road begins at the Bulgaria–Romania border at the Durankulak checkpoint on the Black Sea and heads south through the easternmost part of the Dobrudzha Plateau of the Danubian Plain. It passes successively through the villages of Durankulak, Vaklino and Ezerets and reaches the town of Shabla. The road the turns in a southwest, runs through the villages of Gorun, Poruchik Chunchevo and Hadzhi Dimitar and reaches the town of Kavarna, where it turns west. The I-9 next passes through the villages of Bozhurets and Topola, runs north of the town of Balchik, turns southwest, descends from the Dobrudja Plateau at the village of Obrochishte and reaches the valley of the river Batova. It continues south along the river valley, passes through the western part of the seaside resort of Albena and through the village of Kranevo, reaches the Black Sea coast and enters Varna Province.

Maintaining southern direction, the road passes successively through the resorts of Golden Sands and Saints Constantine and Helena, crosses the city of Varna from east to west, overcomes the channel between Lake Varna and the Black Sea through the Asparuhov Bridge, ascends the ridge of the Avren Plateau and south of the village of Zvezditsa connects with the Cherno More motorway at the latter's Km 9.2. From there, the road continues south along the plateau, passing through the villages of Priseltsi and Bliznatsi, descends the plateau, crosses the river Kamchiya and reaches the village of Staro Oryahovo. At the village of Rudnik it crosses the northern branch of the Kamchiya Mountain of the Balkan Mountains, descends into the valley of the Fandakliyska reka, crosses the southern branch of the Kamchiya Mountain at the village of Goritsa, passes through the town of Byala and enters Burgas Province.

Road I-9 then crosses the river Dvoynitsa, passes through the center of the town of Obzor and the village of Banya, overcomes the ridge of the Eminska Mountain through the Primorski Pass (450 m) and descends to the Burgas Plain in the northern part of the Sunny Beach resort. From here to the city of Burgas, the road follows the coastline as it passes through the western part of the resort, crosses the Hadzhiyska reka and as a four-lane dual carriageway bypasses the towns of Nesebar, Aheloy and Pomorie from the west and passes through the Sarafovo neighbourhood of Burgas. It crosses the entire city from north to south, passes east of Lake Mandrensko and, again as a single carriageway, continues through the village of Marinka, and gradually enters the Bosna Ridge — the northernmost part of the Strandzha mountain range. Maintaining its southern direction, the road passes through the village of Krushevets, descends into the valley of the Mladezhka reka in Strandzha Nature Park and at the village of Zvezdets ascends another ridge of Strandzha. The I-9 then descends into the deep valley of the river Veleka, crosses the river and turns southeast, reaching the town of Malko Tarnovo. After the town the road turns sharply west and in 7.3 km reaches its terminus at the Bulgaria–Turkey border at the Malko Tarnovo checkpoint.
