= Zabernovo =

Zabernovo Заберново
- Village
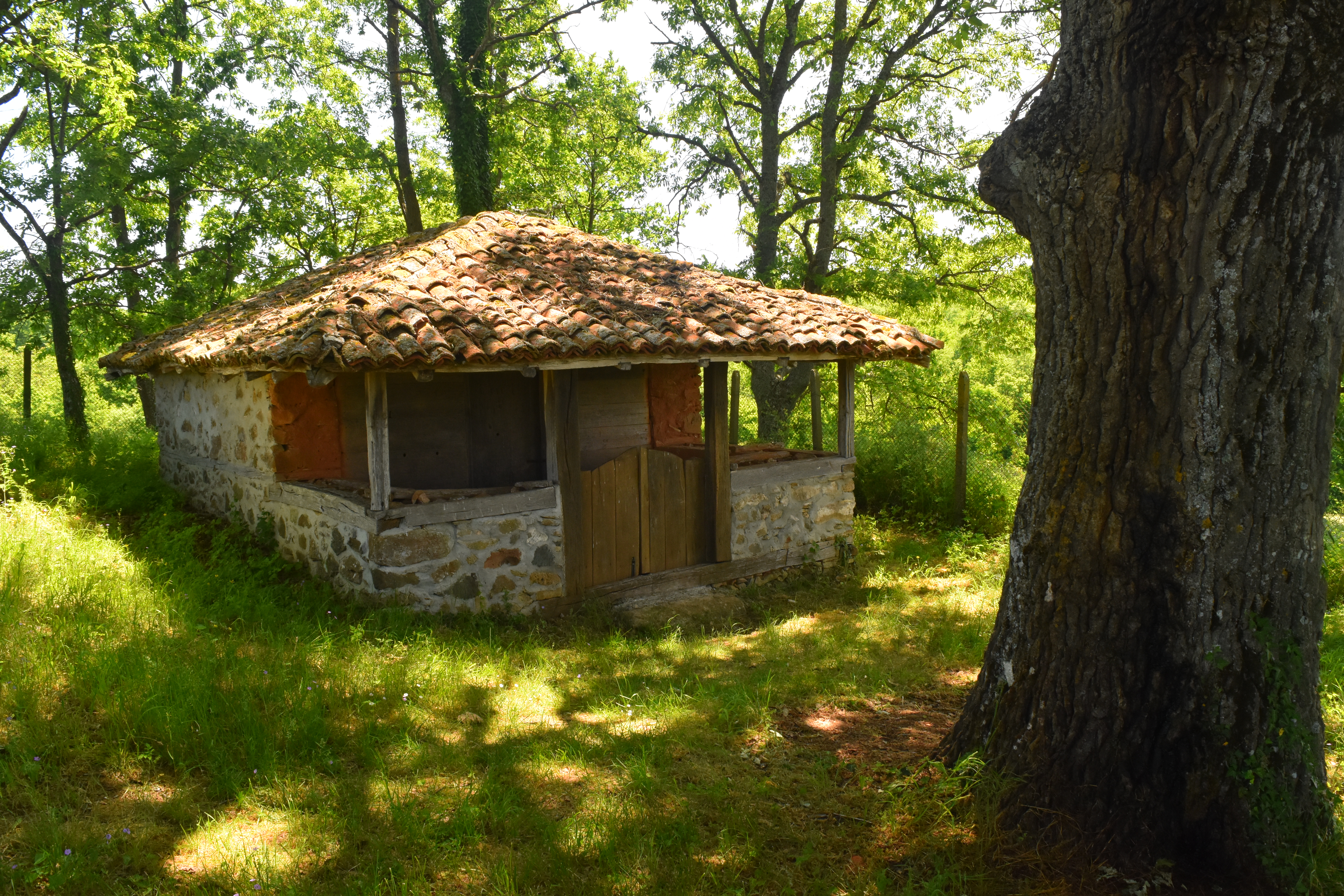

- Location within Bulgaria
- Coordinates: 42°06′N 27°34′E
- Country: Bulgaria
- Province: Burgas Province
- Municipality: Malko Tarnovo Municipality
- Time zone: UTC+2 (EET)
  - Summer (DST): UTC+3 (EEST)

Zabernovo (Bulgarian: Заберново) is a village in Malko Tarnovo Municipality, in Burgas Province, in southeastern Bulgaria. It is situated in Strandzha Nature Park.

Paroria, a forest known for being the 14th-century monastic site of the hesychast Gregory of Sinai, is located just to the west of Zabernovo.

== Honours ==
Zabernovo Bastion on Davis Coast, Antarctica is named after the village.
