= Kalovo, Bulgaria =

Kalovo Калово
- Village
- Location within Bulgaria
- Coordinates: 42.3378°N 22.1700°E
- Country: Bulgaria
- Province: Burgas Province
- Municipality: Malko Tarnovo Municipality
- Time zone: UTC+2 (EET)
  - Summer (DST): UTC+3 (EEST)

Kalovo (Bulgarian: Калово) is a village in Malko Tarnovo Municipality, in Burgas Province, in southeastern Bulgaria. It is situated in Strandzha Nature Park.

Kalovo village is located 54 km from Malko Tarnovo and 56 km from Bourgas. The name comes from the Greek word "Kalos", which means "beautiful". There is a legend which says that prior to moving to Kalovo, the village founders lived in the area Strandjan Sarzhdevo, but their children are sick and dying. Then the people decided to move to another place and asked the Greek merchant, who traveled around the world to show their place. People on the left of the dealer, and when they reached the land of this village, garkat them as the most suitable place and since then the village is here.

Kalovo village has narrow, winding streets and old houses. The village church, St. George's Church, was built in the late 18th and early 19th centuries.

St. Panteleimon is located just 2 km from the village of St. Todor "at the end of the village, and St. Petka - 4 km north of Kalovo in place" Paroria.

In the vicinity of the village, in the district Zmeyuvi, there are three dolmens, 5 meters long. Also 1.5 km northwest of Kalovo is "not a stone point", where there are a lot of dolmens.

East Kalovo Paroria is a protected area, and the village is the starting point for a number of "Eco Tours".
