= Sinemorets =

Sinemorets Синеморец
- Village
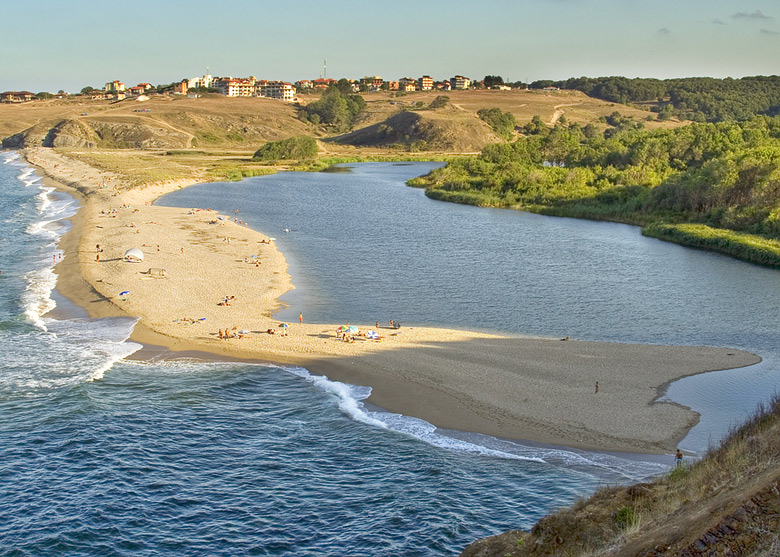
- A beach at the mouth of the Veleka, Sinemorets

- Location within Bulgaria
- Coordinates: 42°4′N 27°59′E
- Country: Bulgaria
- Province: Burgas
- Municipality: Tsarevo

Government
  - Mayor: Georgi Lapchev (GERB)

Area
  - Total: 27.808 km^{2} (10.737 sq mi)
- Elevation: 0 m (0 ft)

Population (2024)
  - Total: 524
  - Density: 18.8/km^{2} (48.8/sq mi)
- Time zone: UTC+2 (EET)
  - Summer (DST): UTC+3 (EEST)
- Postal code: 8279
- Area code: (+359) 550

Sinemorets (Bulgarian: Синеморец, also Sinemorec, Sinemoretz, "place on the blue sea") is a village and seaside resort on the Black Sea coast of Bulgaria.

== Etymology ==
The current name dates back to 1934; prior to that, the village was known as Γαλαζάκι (Galazáki, in Greek, meaning "little blue") or Kalanca (in Turkish).

== Geography ==
Located in the very southeast of the country close to the border with Turkey, where the river Veleka flows into the sea. Sinemorets is part of Tsarevo Municipality, Burgas Province, and has a population of 216 as of September 2005. It is situated in Strandzha Nature Park, which assists in its range of flora and fauna.

== History ==
Ceramic fragments from the 5th-4th century BC have been found in the Potamya inlet south of the village, as well as anchors and metal casing of an ancient ships. The village was first mentioned in an Ottoman document in 1496; the population then consisted of only 16 Christian families, as the attacks of sea pirates had forced many to move to inland Strandzha. According to Austrian diplomat Wenzel von Brognard who sailed near the village, in 1766 it had 17 houses and its population mainly engaged in wooden exports. According to another westerner, Enelholm, in 1824 it had 30 houses and was located somewhat inland, with only its pier on the coast. Again, the low population and the location is explained by the attacks of the Caucasian Laz pirates.

After the Balkan Wars, the village and the surrounding area were ceded to Bulgaria. According to the Mollov-Kafandaris Agreement of 1927, the entire Greek population of the village moved to Greece and was substituted with Bulgarian refugees from Eastern Thrace. In 1926, it had 68 households.

== Current Use ==
The area was opened to the public in 1989 when access to the border zone was allowed, and it has since developed rapidly although efforts are still made to maintain the animal population that evolved prior to population growth. It has two lifeguarded beaches, Veleka Beach (Bulgarian: Плаж "Велека") to the north and Butamya Beach (Bulgarian: Плаж "Бутамя") to the south of the village.

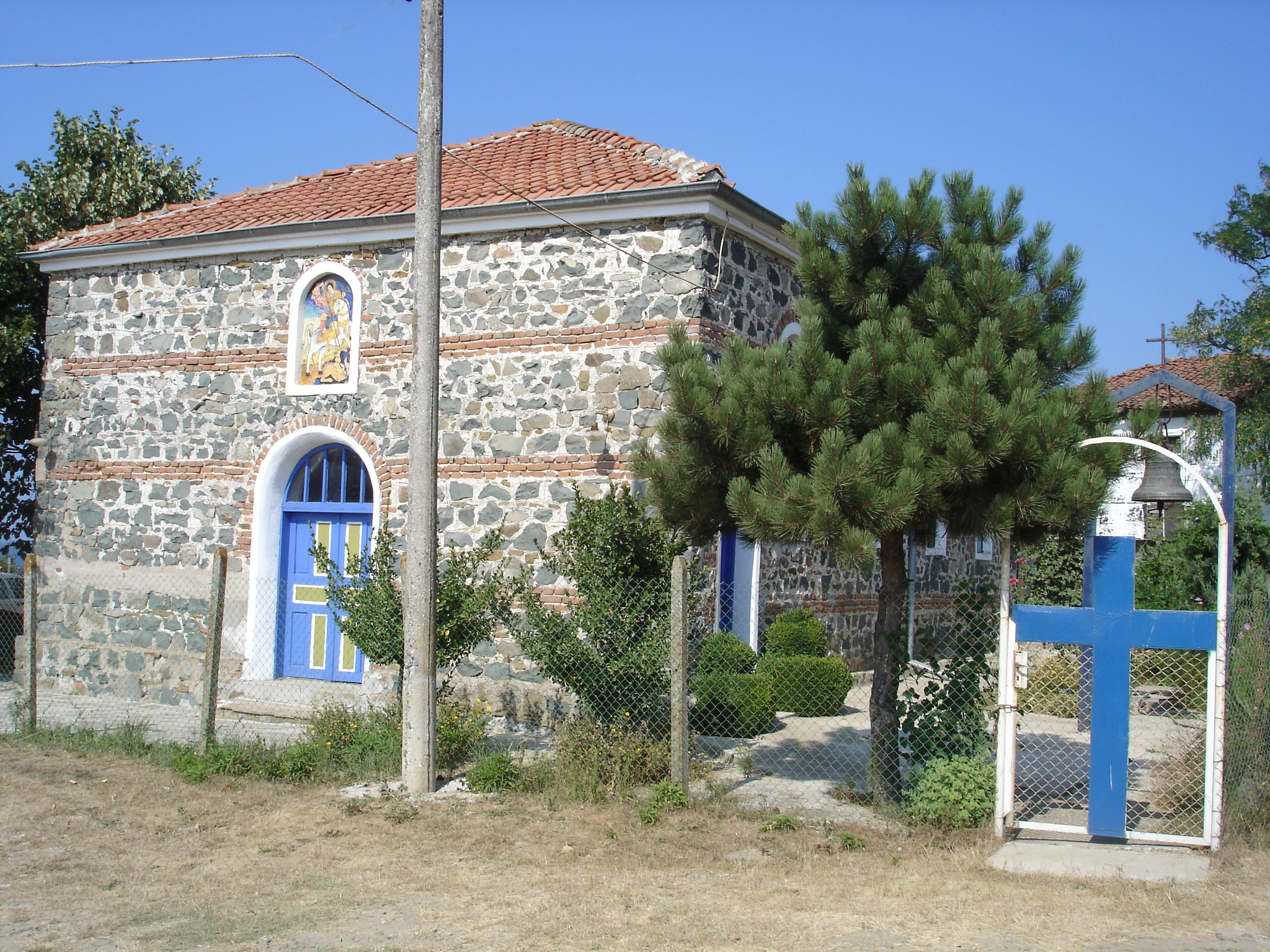
An Orthodox church in Sinemorets

== Honour ==
Sinemorets Hill on Livingston Island in the South Shetland Islands, Antarctica is named after Sinemorets.
