= Dyavolska reka =

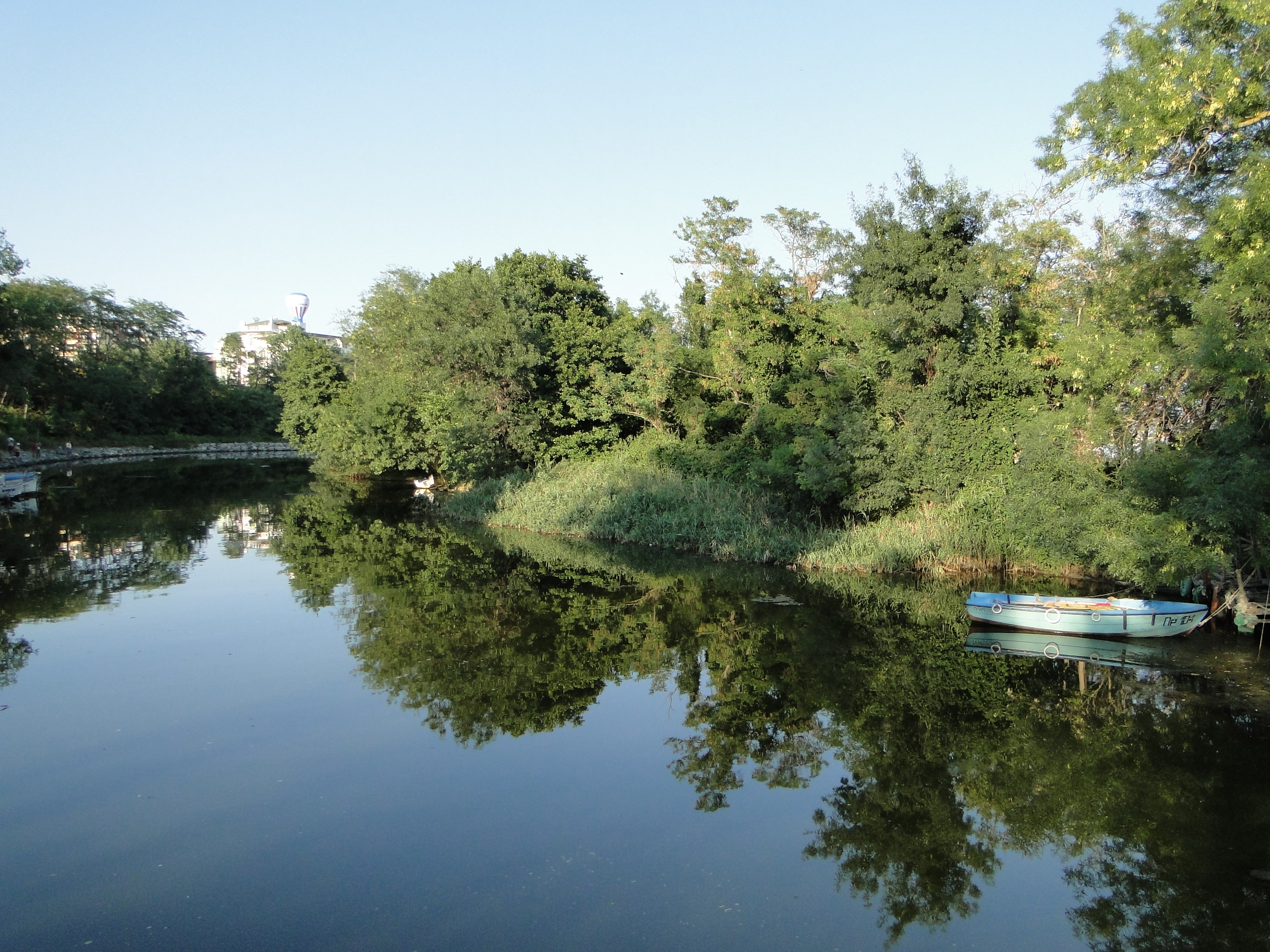

Location
- Country: Bulgaria

Physical characteristics
- Source
  - location: SE of Chukara, Strandzha
  - coordinates: 42°9′14.04″N 27°32′48.12″E
  - elevation: 440 m (1,440 ft)
- Mouth
  - location: Black Sea
  - coordinates: 42°15′52.92″N 27°45′18″E
  - elevation: 0 m (0 ft)
- Length: 37 km (23 mi)
- Basin size: 133 km^{2} (51 sq mi)

The Dyavolska reka (Bulgarian: Дяволска река, "devil's river") is a 37 km long river in Burgas Province, southeastern Bulgaria.

The river originates under the name Dudenska reka from a spring at an altitude of 440 m, southeast of the summit of Chukara (466 m) in the Bosna Ridge of the Strandzha mountain range. It flows in northeastern direction though a forested valley until the village of Yasna polyana. Downstream of the village it turns east and forms a wide swampy valley until its mouth in a dike-protected riverbed. It flows into the Black Sea at the town of Primorsko. The marshy area at is mouth is known as Dyavolsko blato (Bulgarian: Дяволско блато, "devil's swamp"), covered by common reed ("Phragmites australis"). The swamp is fed by a freshwater spring, has an area of 2.7 km^{2} and depth up to 3 m.

Its drainage basin covers a territory of 133 km^{2} and borders the drainage basins of the Ropotamo to the north and west, the Veleka to the southwest, and the Karaagach to the south and southeast, all of them flowing into the Black Sea.

The Dyavolska reka has predominantly rain feed with high water in January–February and low water in August.

The river flows entirely in Burgas Province. There are two settlements along its course: the village of Yasna polyana and the town of Primorsko in Primorsko Municipality. Two kilometers upstream from the village is located Yasna Polyana Reservoir, built for irrigation and potable water supple for many settlements along the southern Bulgarian Black Sea Coast.

== Gallery ==
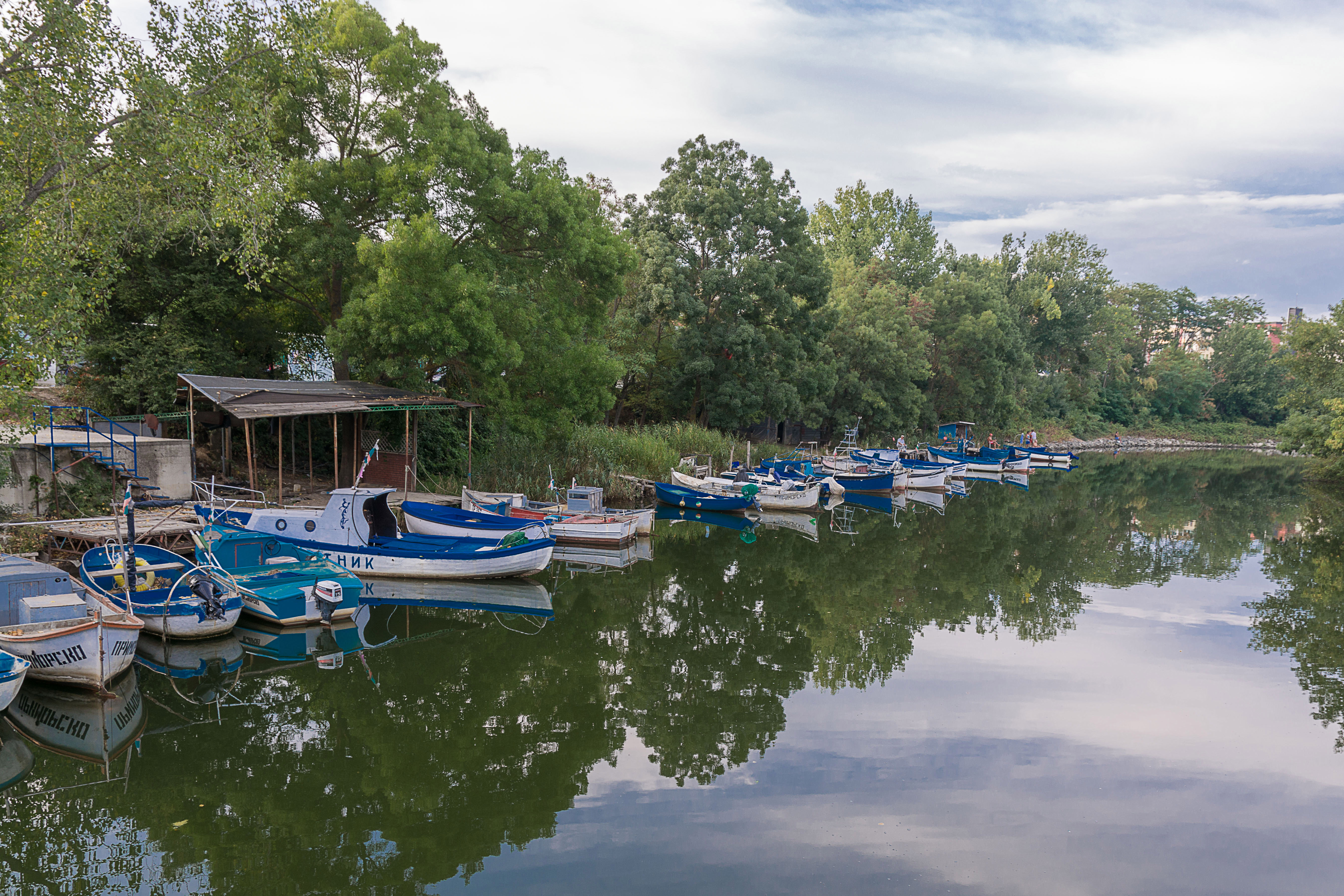

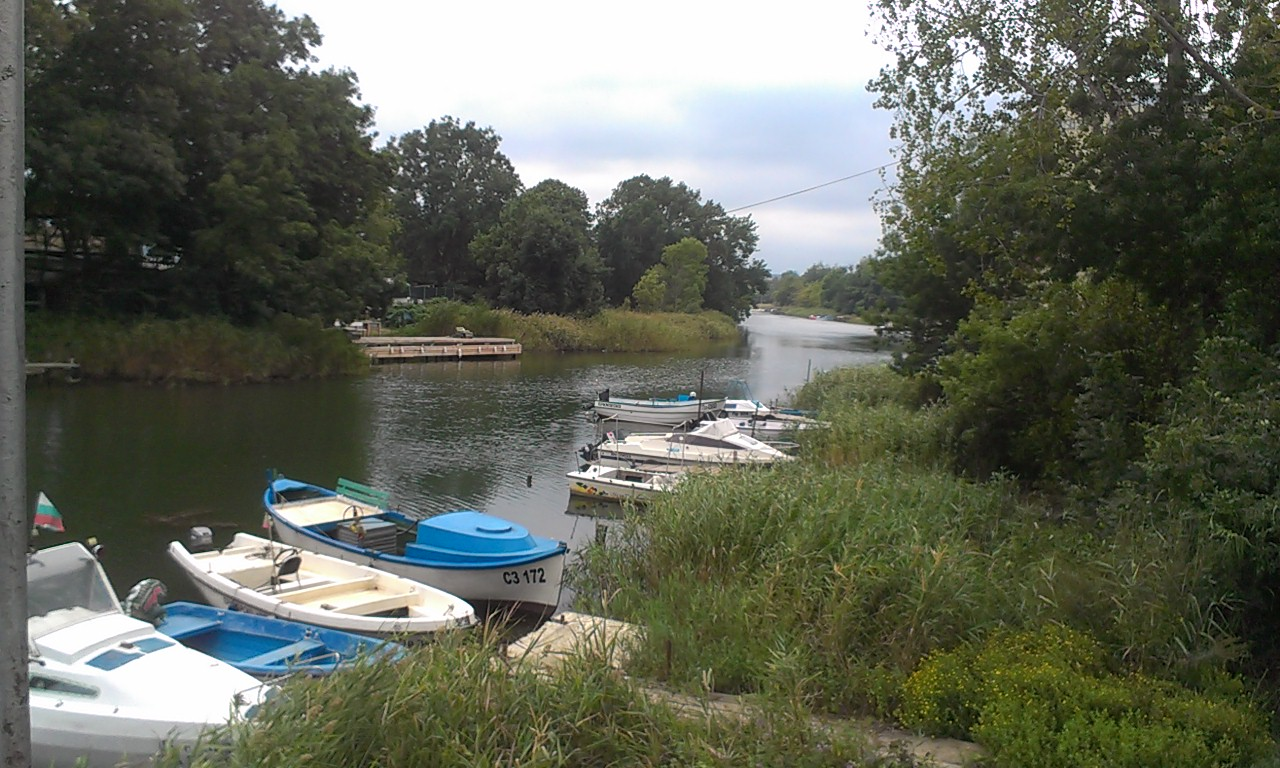

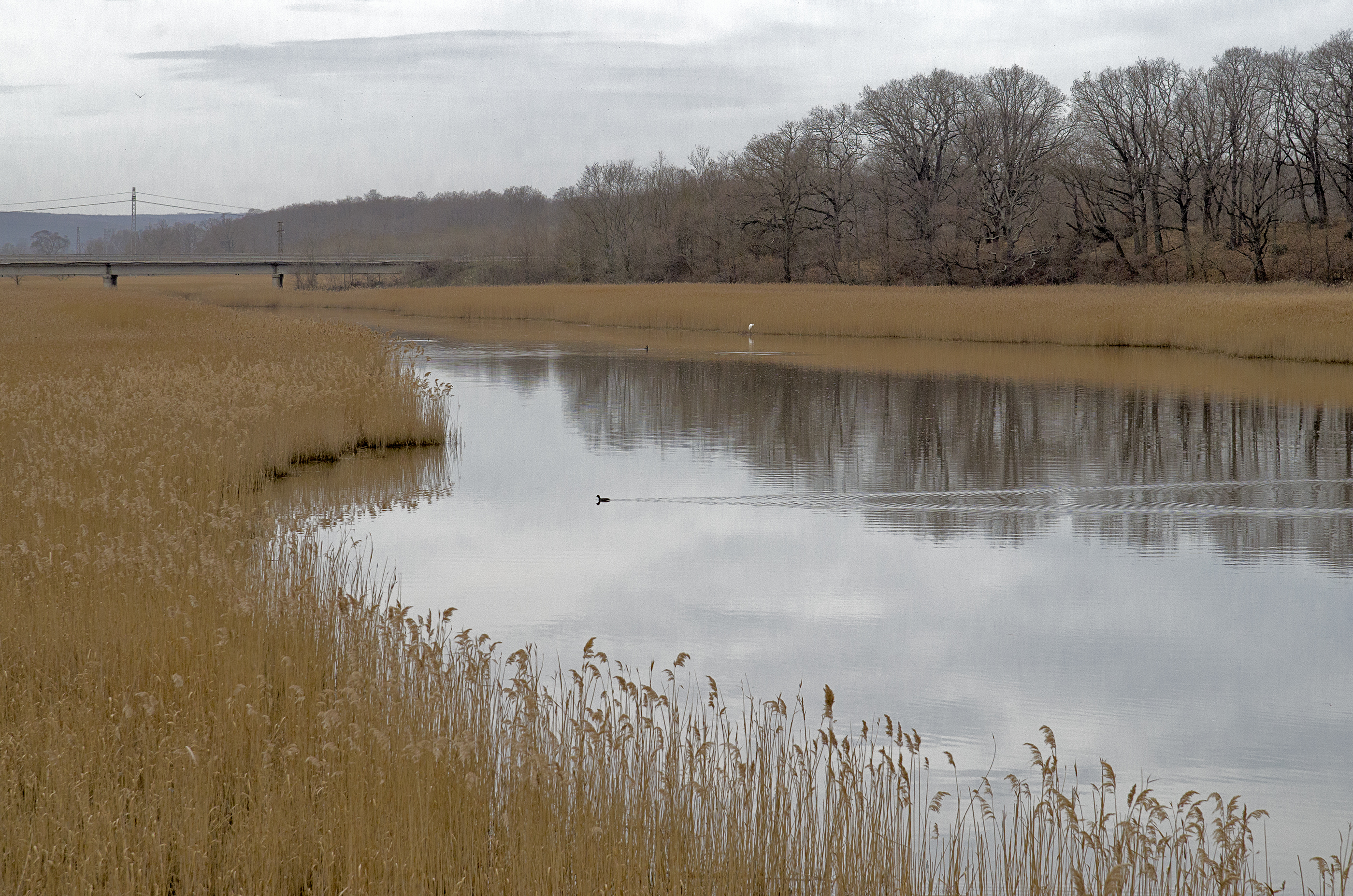
