= Mladezhko =

Mladezhko Младежко
- Village
- Location within Bulgaria
- Coordinates: 42°09′N 27°22′E
- Country: Bulgaria
- Province: Burgas Province
- Municipality: Malko Tarnovo Municipality
- Time zone: UTC+2 (EET)
  - Summer (DST): UTC+3 (EEST)

Mladezhko (Bulgarian: Младежко) is a village in Malko Tarnovo Municipality, in Burgas Province, in southeastern Bulgaria. It is situated in Strandzha Nature Park.
