= Paroria (region) =

Area in southeastern Bulgaria

- Парория
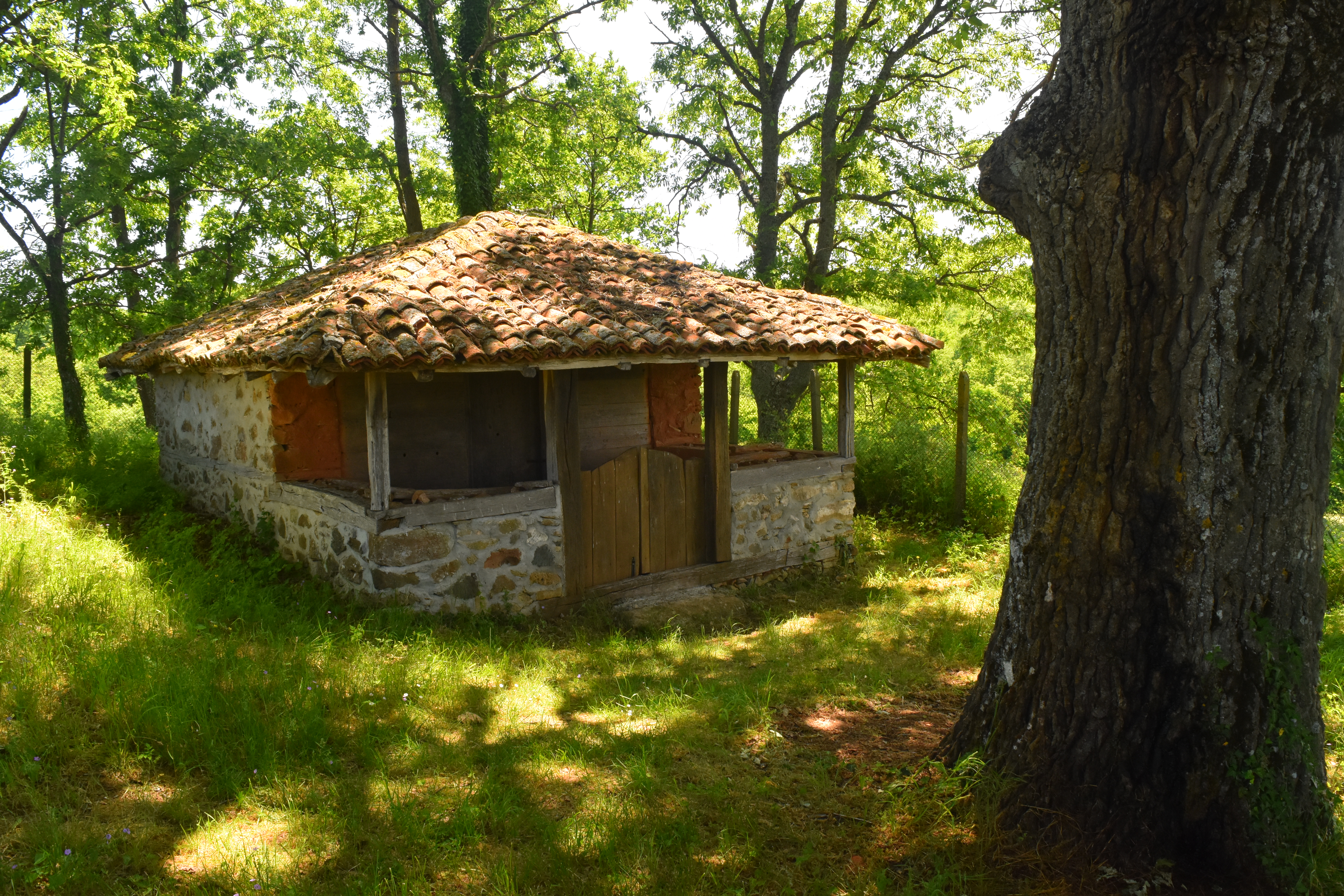
- The Chapel of Saint George near Zabernovo stands on one of Paroria's traditional holy sites
- Interactive map of Paroria
- Location: Bulgaria
- Nearest city: Zabernovo
- Coordinates: 42°6′0″N 27°32′13″E

Paroria (Bulgarian: Парория, Greek: Παρορία) is a protected area in the Strandzha Mountains of southeastern Bulgaria. It is known for its old-growth forests and also for being a 14th-century monastic center led by Gregory of Sinai and his disciples such as Romylos of Vidin. The Serbian monk Grigorije of Gornjak also lived in Paroria.

Paroriais located just to the west of the villages of Zabernovo and Kalovo in Malko Tarnovo Municipality, Burgas Province (less than 30 km from the border with Turkey).

== Monasticism ==
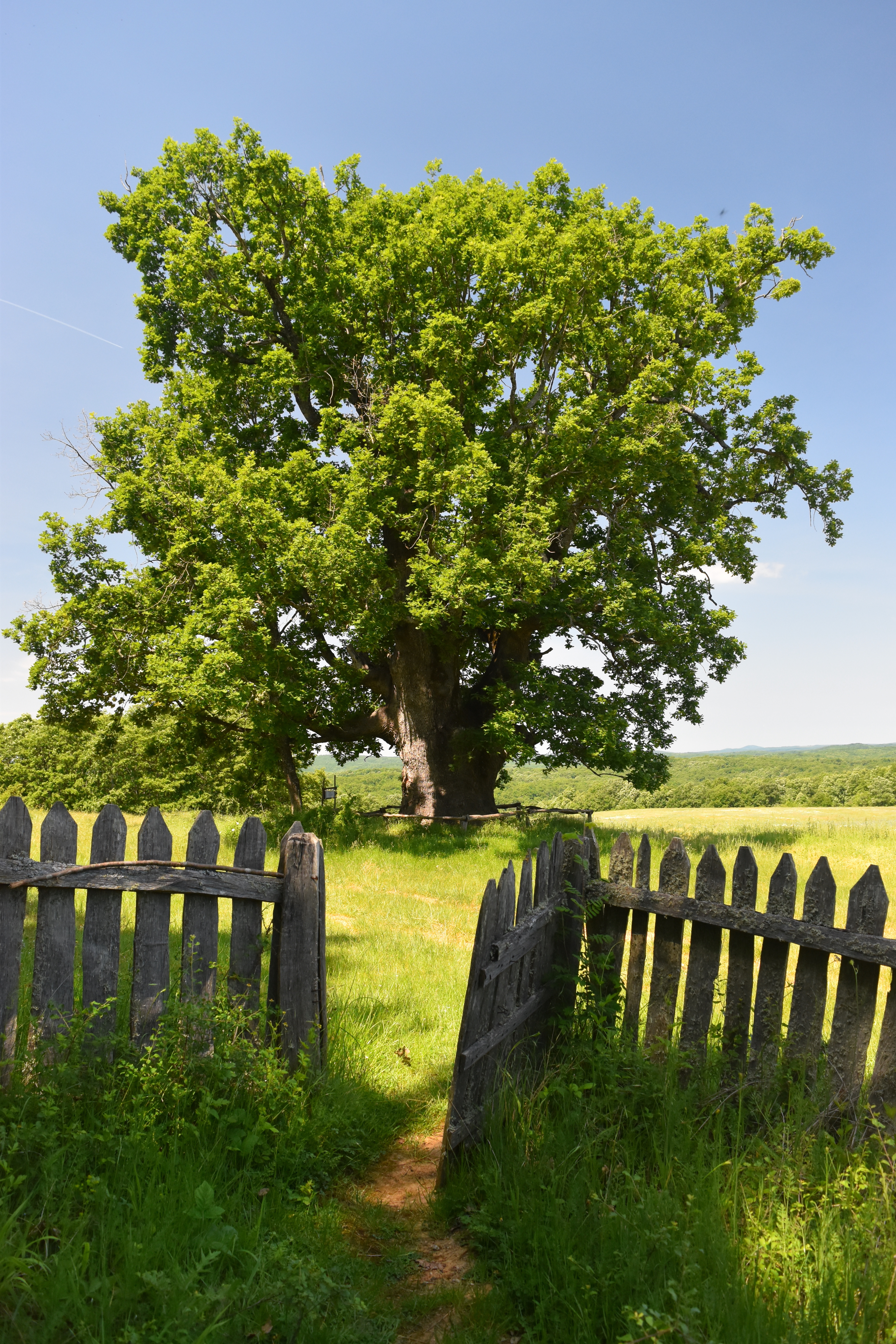
This 970-year-old Italian oak tree (Quercus frainetto) is one of the oldest known oak trees in the Bulgarian Strandzha. It is located on the outskirts of Zabernovo village in Malko Tarnovo Municipality.

Paroria is known for being a Christian monastic center in the 14th century. During the mid-1300s, Gregory of Sinai moved from Mount Athos to Paroria with his disciples in order to practice hesychasm. The Bulgarian emperor Ivan Alexander (reigned 1331–1371) gave refuge to Gregory of Sinai and provided funds for the construction of a monastery in Paroria, which attracted clerics from Bulgaria, Byzantium, and Serbia. Gregory founded the monastery in 1330 and died in Paroria in 1346.

Throughout the 14th century, Paroria had many bandits who regularly harassed the local monks, although imperial intervention had often helped to ameliorate the situation.

During that time, Paroria became second only to Mount Athos in its importance as a center for the practice and dissemination of hesychasm. However, by the 15th century, Paroria was abandoned by Christian monks as they moved to Kilifarevo Monastery in Kilifarevo (near Trnovo) and other locations, due to continual raids by the Ottoman Turks.

Today, Paroria Monastery's ruins can be found in a few different sites at Paroria, including in Voden, Bolyarovo.

== See also ==
- Strandzha Nature Park
- Monastic community of Mount Athos
- Kilifarevo
- Grigorije of Gornjak
