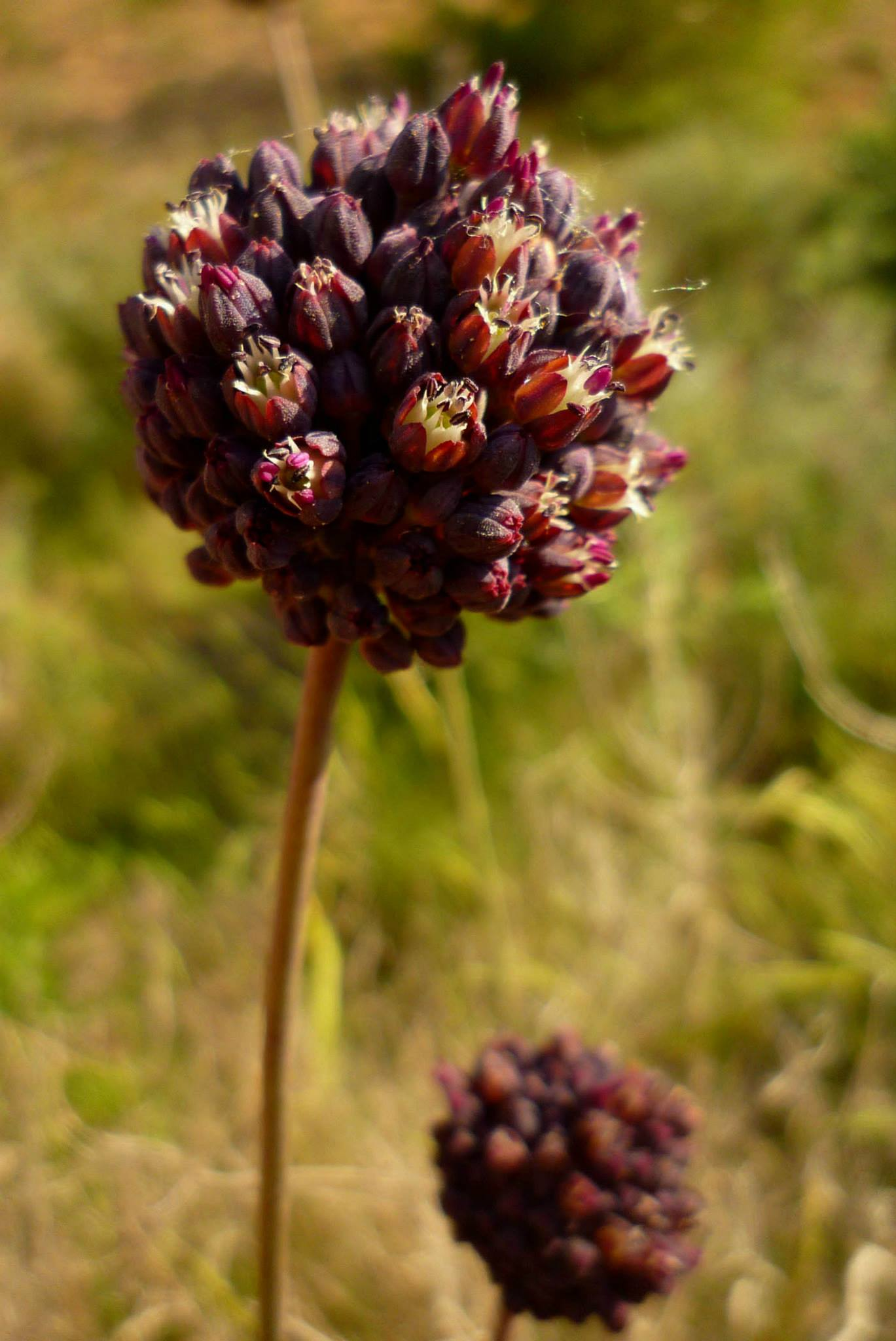

Conservation status
- Near Threatened (IUCN 3.1)

Scientific classification
- Kingdom: Plantae
- Clade: Embryophytes
- Clade: Tracheophytes
- Clade: Spermatophytes
- Clade: Angiosperms
- Clade: Monocots
- Order: Asparagales
- Family: Amaryllidaceae
- Subfamily: Allioideae
- Genus: Allium
- Species: A. melananthum

Binomial name
- Allium melananthum Coincy

= Allium melananthum =

Species of flowering plant

Allium melananthum, called ajo oscuro (dark garlic), ajo negro (black garlic) or ajo de flor negra (black-flowered garlic), is a species of wild garlic native to southeast coastal areas of Spain. It is similar to three other species of Allium of the western Mediterranean, A. pruinatum, A. sphaerocephalon and A. ebusitanum, but can be distinguished from them by its dark purple to blackish-purple tepals, and its exerted stamens.
