= Uzunbodzhak =

UNESCO Biosphere Reserve in south-eastern Bulgaria

Uzunbodzhak Biosphere Reserve
- IUCN category Ia (strict nature reserve)
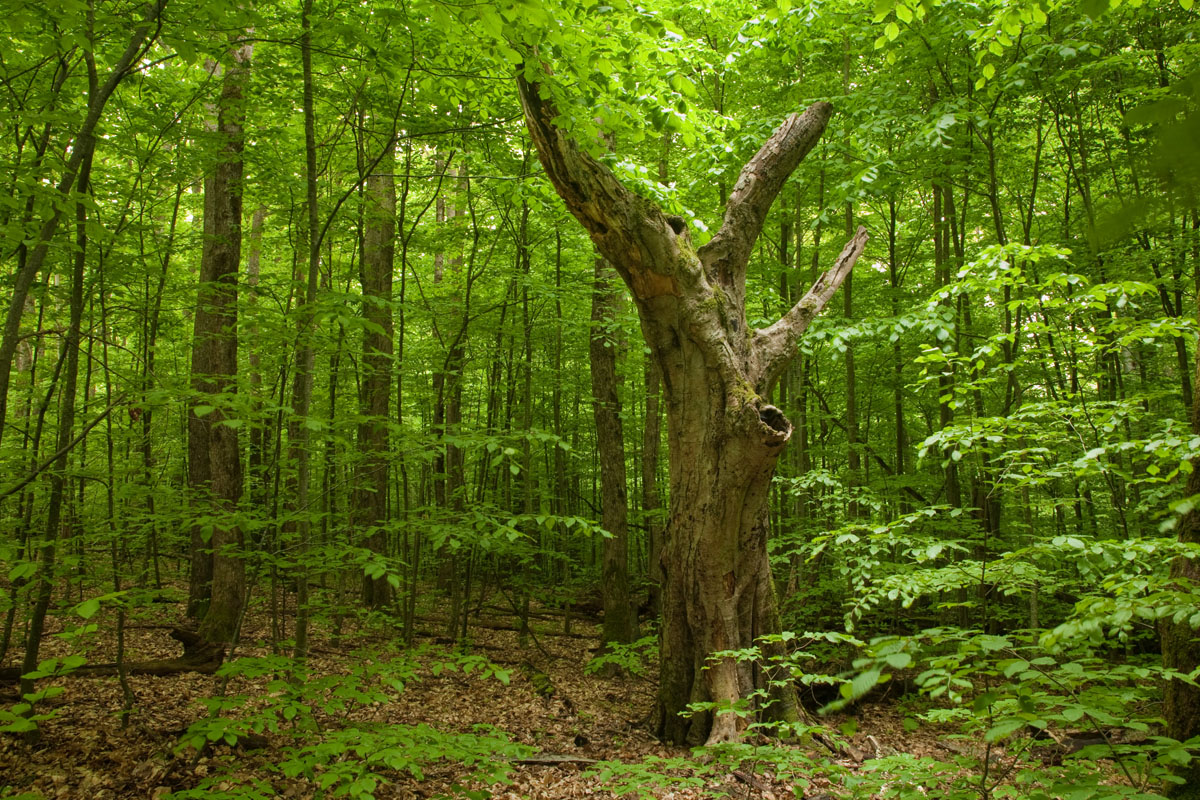

- Location within Bulgaria
- Location: Municipalities of Malko Tarnovo and Tsarevo, Burgas Province, Bulgaria
- Nearest city: Malko Tarnovo, Tsarevo
- Coordinates: 42°04′01.2″N 27°46′58.8″E
- Area: 25.296 km^{2} (9.767 sq mi)
- Established: 1956
- Governing body: Ministry of Environment and Water

Uzunbodzhak (Bulgarian: Узунбоджак), also transliterated as Ouzounboudjak is an UNESCO Biosphere Reserve, one of the five nature reserves in Strandzha Nature Park in south-eastern Bulgaria. The reserve is sometimes called Lopushna (Bulgarian: Лопушна). Uzunbodzhak was established on 13 December 1956 and was included in the UNESCO network of biosphere reserves in March 1977. It covers an area of 2529.6 hectares, or 25.296 km^{2}. All economic activities are prohibited on the territory of the reserve.

== Geography ==
The reserve is situated between the villages of Kosti in Tsarevo Municipality и Slivarovo in Malko Tarnovo Municipality, in the valley of the Rezovo river at about 20 km from its mouth. The relief is uneven. The altitude varies between 50 and 300 m.

The climate is continental Mediterranean and tends to be milder because of the proximity to the Black Sea. The average monthly temperature in winter does not fall under 0°C (2-3°C in January). The soils are cinnamon and yellow-podzolic.

Uzunbodzhak is crossed by the rivers Rezovo, Karetarski Dol and Lopushnitsa.

== Flora ==
There are 651 species and subspecies of vascular plants. Around 65% of the forests are dominated by oak, and 30% by beech. The forests are more than 200 years old.

Relict plant species include Strandzhan oak (Quercus hartwissiana), cherry laurel (Laurocerasus officinalis), pontic rhododendron (Rhododendron ponticum), Pontic daphne (Daphne pontica), Colchic holly (Ilex colchica), Rose-of-Sharon (Hypericum calycinum), Caucasian whortleberry (Vaccinium arctostaphylos), oleaster-leafed pear (Pyrus elaeagrifolia), common medlar (Mespilus germanica), Pontic fritillary (Fritillaria pontica), etc.

== Fauna ==
The fauna in Uzunbodzhak is diverse. The most common mammals are the wild boar, wildcat, grey wolf, golden jackal, red fox, European badger, roe deer, European hare, grey dwarf hamster. The Eurasian lynx roamed the territory of the reserve until the 1930s, when it went extinct from the region.

The reserve is home to a number of species, such as common buzzard, long-legged buzzard, Eurasian sparrowhawk, lesser spotted eagle, common kingfisher, white-throated dipper, fieldfare, grey wagtail, corn bunting, hawfinch, European stonechat, common cuckoo, black stork, different species of falcons, woodpeckers, swallows, etc.

The amphibians and the reptiles include common toad, marsh frog, agile frog, as well as European green lizard, Darevskia praticola, slowworm, Kotschy's gecko, smooth snake, Caspian whipsnake, Aesculapian snake, Montpellier snake and European ratsnake.
