= Nicolai Anders von Hartwiss =

Russian botanist and plant breeder (1793–1860)

Nicolai Anhorn von Hartwiss
- Born: 24 May 1793; Kokenhof, Governorate of Livonia, Russian Empire
- Died: 6 December 1860 (aged 67); Artek, Russian Empire
- Education: University of Dorpat
- Occupations: Botanist; plant breeder
- Employer: Russian Imperial Botanical Garden
- Title: Director of the Botanic Garden
- Term: 1827–1860
- Predecessor: H.H. Steven
- Spouse: Elizabeth Feodorovna Baroness von Rosen
- Parents: Heinrich Ernst Anhorn von Hartwiss (father); Christiane Anhorn von Hartwiss (mother)

Nicolai Anhorn von Hartwiss (Russian: Николай Андерс фон Гартвис), also known as Nikolai Andreyevich Gatvis (Russian: Николай Андреевич Гартвис; 1793–1860) was a Russian botanist, plant explorer and plant breeder of Baltic German descent.

His education at the Imperial University of Dorpat was interrupted by the Napoleonic Wars of 1812–1818 as he served in the Imperial Russian Army. Afterwards he worked on his father's estate, and by 1824, he was living in Riga and had a collection of 500 varieties of fruit trees and roses. He was then appointed to the Russian Imperial Botanical Garden at Nikita, Crimea, where he served as a director for the rest of his career. He is remembered for his plant collection explorations of Georgia and the Crimea, and for the breeding of roses.

== Life ==
Von Hartwiss was born Ritter (esquire) Nikolaus Ernst Bartholomäus Anhorn von Hartwiss (Hartwiß) in 1793 at his father's estate at Kokenhof, near Wolmar, Livonia (now Valmiera, Latvia).

The family Anhorn von Hartwiss (double name) comes from Switzerland. His grandfather, Silvester Samuel (1708–1782), descended from Swiss Protestant pastors and emigrated to Russia. His father, Heinrich Ernst, was a registered member of the Livonian nobility (reg. 1769). He married his first cousin Christina Louisa. Nikolaus was their tenth child. By that time, Livonia (present-day Latvia and Estonia) had been absorbed into the Russian Empire as the Governorate of Livonia, but the nobility still retained its ancient Baltic German forms and spoke Low German.

Hartwiss was educated at the German-speaking Imperial University of Dorpat (1809–1812), where his studies were interrupted by the Napoleonic Wars. He was an officer in the Imperial Russian Army from 1812 to 1818; he was discharged as a result of his wounds.

Hartwiss at one time gained practical gardening experience laying out fields of flowers, fruit trees and both exotic and domestic trees on his father's estate. From 1819 to 1824, he lived in Riga, gardening and fruit growing, with a collection of 500 varieties of fruit trees and roses.

In 1824, he was appointed by Mikhail Semyonovich Vorontsov, governor-general of New Russia, to the Russian Imperial Botanical Garden at Nikita, Crimea. In 1827, he became its second director, which he remained until he died. He extended the Imperial Botanical Garden's collection of plant varieties from more than a thousand to about three thousand, including the largest collection of fruit varieties in Europe.

From Nikita, he organised plant hunting expeditions into the surrounding territories, especially the Crimea and Abkhazia in the Caucasus.

He and his first wife, Elizabeth Feodorovna Baroness von Rosen, had a 500-acre estate called Artek near Bear Mountain (Ayu-Dag) in Crimea. After the death of his first wife in 1855, he married a young girl from Riga, Leontine Werther, in Simferopol on 2 February 1858. However, she died at the end of the same year giving birth to a daughter.

== Exploration ==
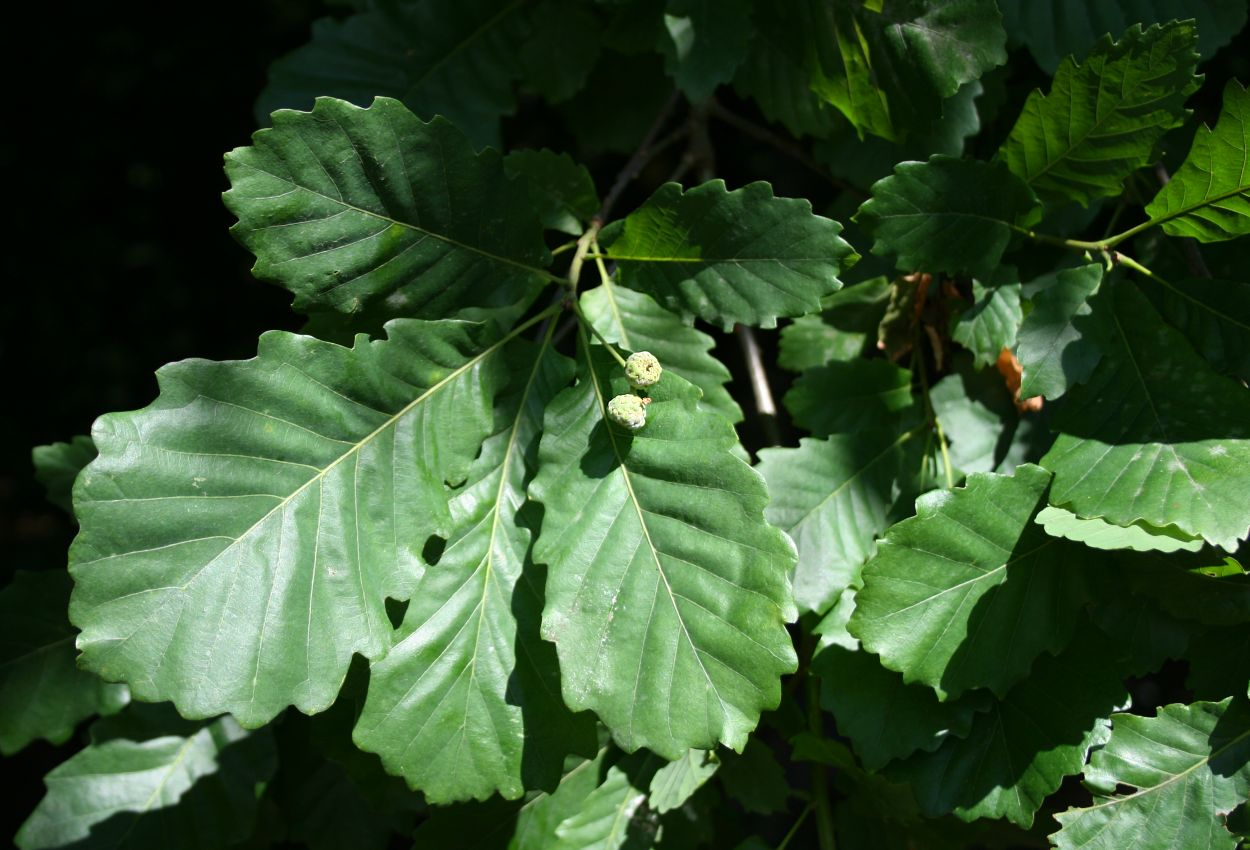
Quercus hartwissiana, named after von Hartwiss by Steven, first director of the Nikita Gardens.

Von Hartwiss collected plants in Georgia and the Crimea. Some species were named by him, some named after him. "Three long expeditions [were made] to the Caucasus in search of new ornamental plants for the Crimea … Caucasian fir, spruce, … Caucasian basswood, rhododendrons, azaleas and other flowering shrubs."

=== Eponyms ===
- (Boraginaceae) Cordia hartwissiana Regel
- (Cupressaceae) Juniperus hartwissiana Steven ex Koeppen
- Strandzha oak (Fagaceae) Quercus hartwissiana Steven
- (Paeoniaceae) Paeonia hartwissiana hort. ex Trautv.

== Plant breeding ==
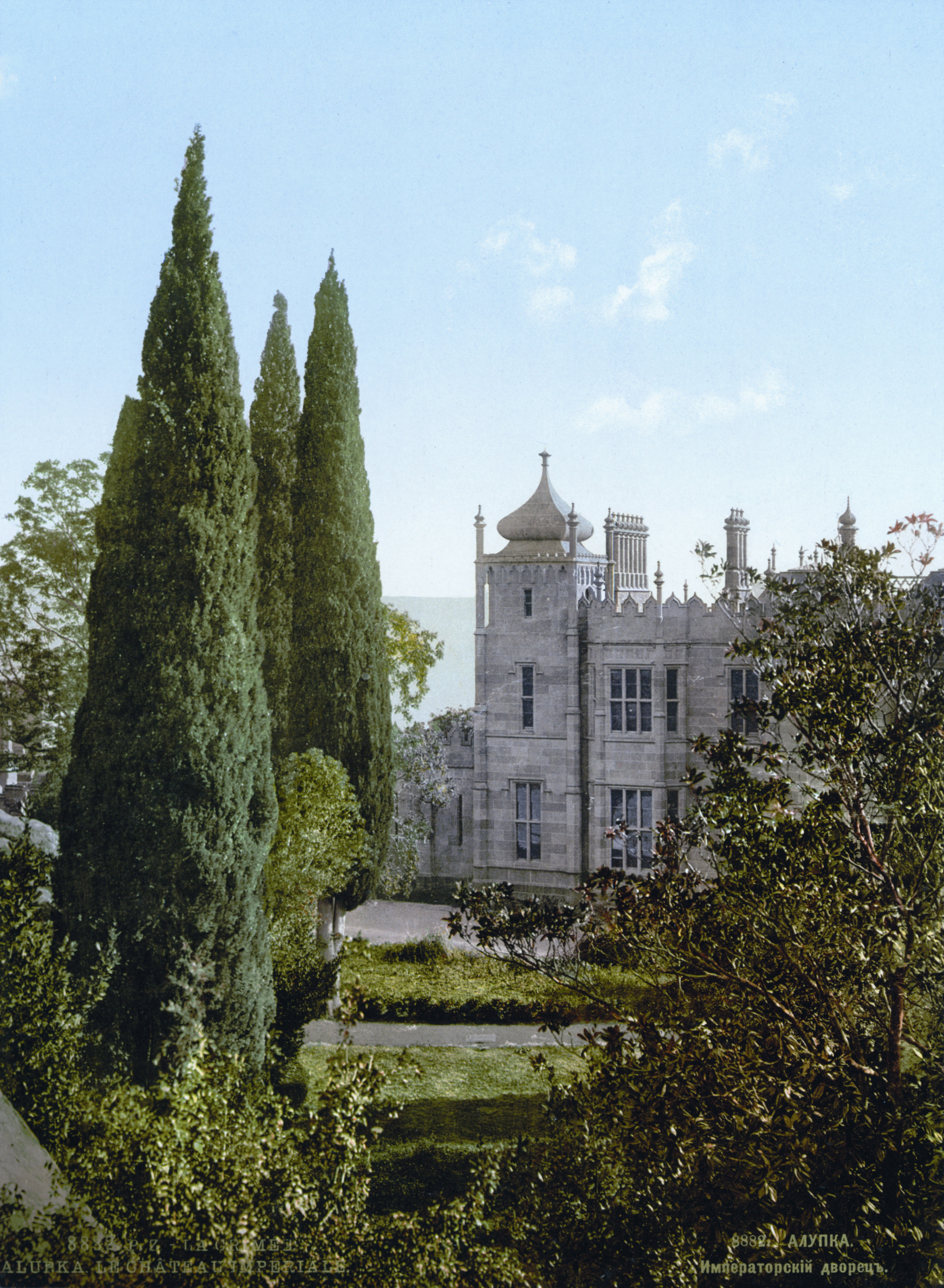
The Vorontsovs' Moorish Castle in Alupka, Crimea (1828-46)

Von Hartwiss imported many plants for the Botanic Garden, including roses. In 1827 he began to breed roses. These were partly for the Garden itself, but also for the Alupka Palace of Count (later Prince) Michael Vorontsov. Some thirty of his roses were sold from the Alupka Palace nursery.

=== Roses bred ===
Von Hartwiss bred more than 100 varieties of roses at the Nikita Garden. Two are still growing at the Alupka Palace: 'Comtesse Elizabeth Woronzof' 1829 and 'Belle de Nikita' 1829. There may also be his rose 'Mignonette d'Alupka' 1829, thought by some to be the rose imported into France and sold as 'Maréchal Niel'. Hartwiss's hand-written 1834 catalogue of roses at Nikita lists scores of roses bred there identified only by description. The Crimean Rose Society – including roses bred after 1834 – lists 127 named varieties.

==== Sortable selection of Hartwiss-bred roses ====
Name	Date	Type	Colour	Extant
Baronne Julie de Berkheim	<1834	China hybrid	unknown	Lost
Belle Lila	<1834	Gallica	unknown	Lost
Belle de Livonie	1827	Alba hybrid	unknown	Lost
Belle de Nikita	1829	China hybrid	Pink	Yes
Belle de Riga	<1834	Gallica hybrid	unknown	Lost
Blanche de Riga	<1834	Alba hybrid	White	Lost
Bouquet de Nikita	1829	Sempervirens hybrid	unknown	Lost
Comtesse Elizabeth Woronzof	1829	China hybrid	Chamois with pink	Yes
Comtesse Nathalie Tchernischoff	<1834	semperflorens hybrid	unknown	Lost
Comtesse Pahlen	<1834	semperflorens hybrid	unknown	Lost
Foncée-brillante de Livonie	<1834	Gallica hybrid	unknown	Lost
Incomparable de Livonie	<1834	Gallica hybrid	unknown	Lost
Mignonette d'Alupka	1829	Hybrid Noisette	Cream	Yes
Ombrée de Riga	<1834	Gallica hybrid	unknown	Lost
Princesse Anne Golitzin	<1834	Grevilliae hybrid	Rich red	Lost
Prometheus	<1834	Gallica hybrid	unknown	Lost
Violacea	<1834	China-semperflorens hybrid	unknown	Lost
Woldemar Hagen	<1834	Gallica hybrid	unknown	Lost
