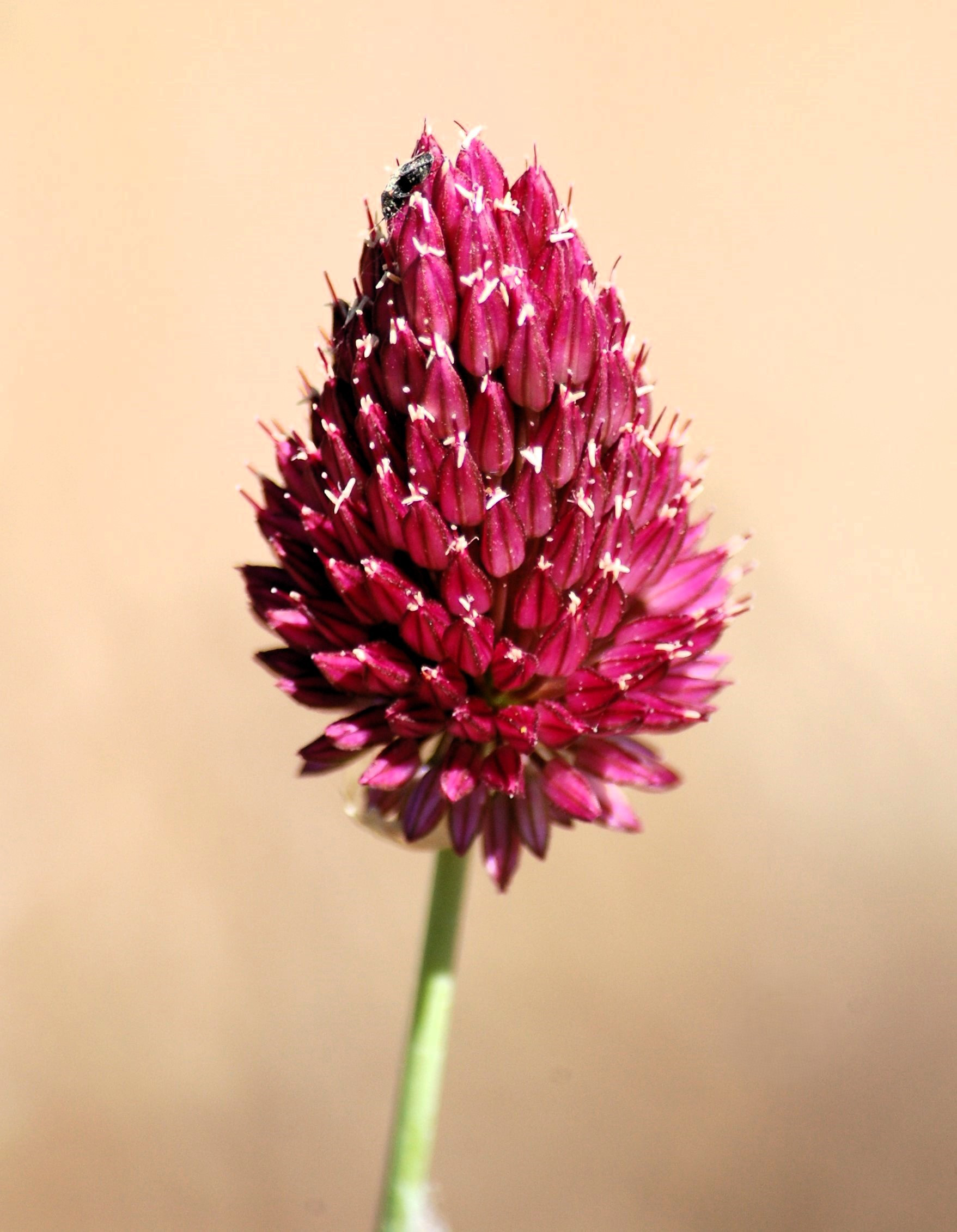

Scientific classification
- Kingdom: Plantae
- Clade: Embryophytes
- Clade: Tracheophytes
- Clade: Angiosperms
- Clade: Monocots
- Order: Asparagales
- Family: Amaryllidaceae
- Subfamily: Allioideae
- Genus: Allium
- Subgenus: A. subg. Allium
- Species: A. sphaerocephalon

Binomial name
- Allium sphaerocephalon L.

Synonyms
- Species synonymy: Allium aegaeum Heldr. & Halácsy; Allium aestivum Tineo; Allium approximatum Gren. & Gord.; Allium arvense subsp. aestivum (Tineo) Nyman; Allium arvense var. tenuiflorum Nyman; Allium atroviolaceum Hornem. ex Steud.; Allium borbasii A.Kern.; Allium bosniacum Kumm. & Sendtn.; Allium cornutum Kit.; Allium crinitum Tausch; Allium densiflorum De Not.; Allium descendens L.; Allium deseglisei Boreau; Allium eminens Gren. ex Parl.; Allium gherardii De Not.; Allium lineare Ten.; Allium loscosii K.Richt.; Allium macrocephalum Kit.; Allium margaritaceum var. robustum Maire; Allium parviflorum L.; Allium parviflorum Desv.; Allium parvifolium Crantz; Allium purpureum Loscos; Allium pygmaeum E.Perrier; Allium regnieri Maire; Allium rotundum var. bosniacum (Kumm. & Sendtn.) Nyman; Allium sardoum var. gherardii (De Not.) Nyman; Allium schmidtianum Tausch; Allium sphaerocephalon var. aegaeum (Heldr. & Halácsy) Hayek; Allium sphaerocephalon var. approximatum (Gren. & Gord.) Nyman; Allium sphaerocephalon var. bosniacum (Kumm. & Sendtn.) Asch. & Graebn.; Allium sphaerocephalon var. crinitum (Tausch) Nyman; Allium sphaerocephalon var. descendens (L.) Regel; Allium sphaerocephalon subsp. descendens (L.) K.Richt.; Allium sphaerocephalon f. prostratum Corill., Figureau & Godeau; Allium sphaerocephalon var. purpureum Nyman; Allium tenuiflorum Delastre; Allium veronense Spreng.; Kromon parviflorum (L.) Raf.; Porrum crinitum (Tausch) Rchb.; Porrum descendens (L.) Rchb.; Porrum sphaerocephaluon (L.) Rchb.

= Allium sphaerocephalon =

Species of flowering plant

Allium sphaerocephalon is a plant species in the Amaryllis family known as round-headed leek, round-headed garlic, ball-head onion, and other variations on these names. Drumstick allium is another common name applied to this species. Some publications use the alternate spelling Allium sphaerocephalum. It is a bulbous herbaceous perennial plant.

Allium sphaerocephalon is found in the wild across all parts of Europe except in the northern and western countries (Scotland, Ireland, Netherlands, Scandinavia, and the Baltic States). Its native range extends to northern Africa and to western Asia as far east as Iran. It is also reportedly naturalised in New York State in the United States. In England it grows wild only in the Avon Gorge so is known locally as the Bristol onion.

The species is prized by gardeners because of its striking floral display. The spherical "head" (technically an umbel) is borne on a long scape, up to 50 cm in height, usually in July. It can contain hundreds of deep reddish purple flowers.

The specific epithet sphaerocephalon derives from ancient Greek, meaning "spherical head".

This plant has gained the Royal Horticultural Society's Award of Garden Merit.

== Description ==
Allium sphaerocephalon produces egg-shaped bulbs. Small bulblets are present under the outer layer of the stem (making the plant potentially invasive when grown in gardens). Flowers are borne on a scape up to 50 cm in height, in a spherical to egg-shaped umbel, 1–6 cm in diameter, tightly packed with many flowers crowded together. The relatively small size of the umbel relative to the height of the stem makes this one of those described as "drumstick alliums". Individual flowers are reddish-purple and are occasionally replaced by bulbils (again making this a potentially invasive species).

=== Subspecies and varieties ===
- Allium sphaerocephalon var. aegaeum (Heldr. & Halácsy) Hayek - Aegean Islands
- Allium sphaerocephalon subsp. arvense (Guss.) Arcang. - Sicily, Malta, Albania, Greece, Turkey, Cyprus, Syria, Lebanon, Egypt, Algeria, Tunisia, Morocco
- Allium sphaerocephalon subsp. laxiflorum (Guss.) Giardina & Raimondo - Sicily
- Allium sphaerocephalon subsp. sphaerocephalon - much of Europe plus Morocco, Canary Islands, Middle East
- Allium sphaerocephalon subsp. trachypus (Boiss. & Spruner) K.Richt. - Greece and Turkey incl Aegean Islands

=== Formerly included ===
- Allium sphaerocephalon subsp. durandoi, now called Allium ebusitanum
- Allium sphaerocephalon subsp. ebusitanum, now called Allium ebusitanum
- Allium sphaerocephalon subsp. rollii, now called Allium amethystinum
- Allium sphaerocephalon subsp. sardoum, now called Allium guttatum subsp. sardoum
- Allium sphaerocephalon var. scaberrimum, now called Allium scaberrimum
