= Kokmuiža Manor =

Manor house in Latvia

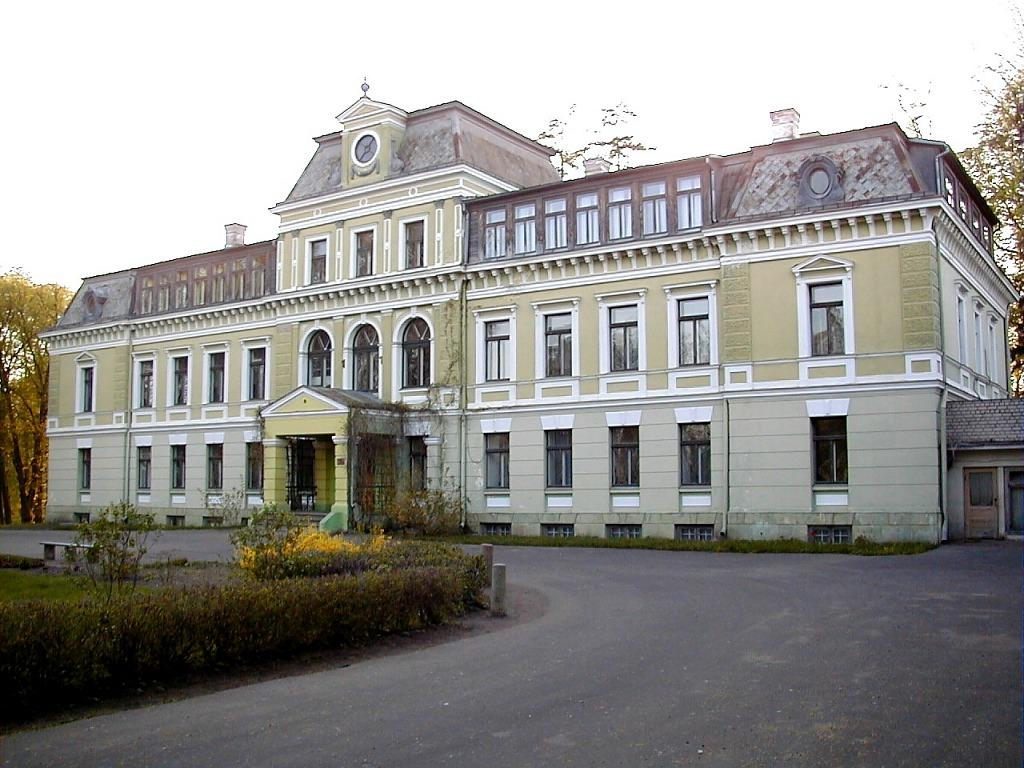

- Location within Latvia

General information
- Location: Kocēni, Kocēni Parish, Valmiera Municipality, Vidzeme, Latvia
- Coordinates: 57°31′22″N 25°20′03″E
- Completed: before 1760

Kokmuiža Manor (Latvian: Kokmuižas kungu māja; German: Kokenhof), also called Kocēni Manor, is a manor house in the Kocēni, Kocēni Parish, Valmiera Municipality in the historical region of Vidzeme, in northern Latvia.

== History ==
It was built before 1760 in late Baroque style. The building currently houses the Kocēni primary school.

It was the birthplace in 1793 of the famous botanist and plant explorer, Nicolai Anders von Hartwiss.

== See also ==
- List of palaces and manor houses in Latvia
