= Christian von Steven =

Russian botanist and entomologist (1781–1863)

- Христиан Стевен
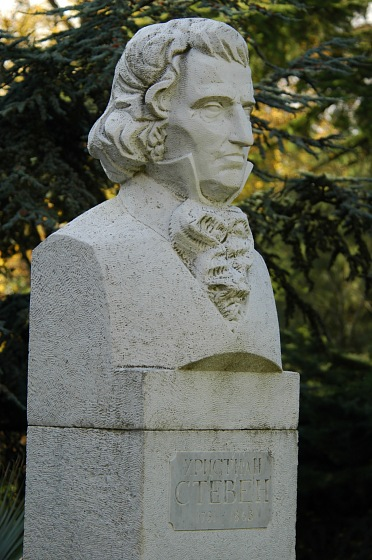
- Monument to Christian von Steven, Nikitsky Botanical Garden
- Born: 19 January 1781; Fredrikshamn, Vyborg Governorate, Russian Empire
- Died: 30 April 1863 (aged 82); Simferopol, Russian Empire
- Education: St Petersburg Medical and Surgical Academy
- Spouse: Marie Karlovna Gartzewitsch (née Hagendorff)
- Awards: Order of Saint Anna, Second Class; Order of St. Vladimir, Third Class (Russia)
- Scientific career
- Fields: Botany; Entomology
- Thesis: Spicilegium cryptogamicum florae Petropolitanae (1800)
- Author abbrev. (botany): Steven

Christian von Steven (Russian: Христиан Христианович Стевен, romanized: Khristian Khristianovich Steven; 19 January 1781 – 30 April 1863) was a Finnish-born Russian botanist and entomologist.

== Personal life ==
Steven was of Swiss descent.

At the age of 57, he married a young widow, Marie Karlovna Gartzewitsch (née Hagendorff), with whom he had five children:

- Anton (b. 12 December 1835), a lieutenant in the Russian Navy, present at the siege of Sevastopol;
- Julia (24 August 1837 – 1855);
- Natalia (27 August 1839 – 1862), married Lieutenant Colonel Hippenreiter;
- Alexander (1844–1910);
- Katharina (b. 16 August 1841).

== Career ==
He studied at the Royal Academy of Turku in Sweden and at Jena in Saxe-Weimar, before studying medicine at Saint Petersburg University in Russia.

The senior Russian sericulture (silk farming) inspector Friedrich August Marschall von Bieberstein employed Steven as his assistant in 1800. He inspected sericulture in the Caucasus, progressing to deputy senior inspector of sericulture in 1806.

In 1812, he participated in the creation of the Nikitsky Botanical Garden at Nikita in Crimea, which he directed until 1827. After von Bieberstein's death in 1826 Steven was appointed senior inspector of sericulture in southern Russia, and Nicolai Anders von Hartwiss became director of the Botanical Garden, with Steven remaining as supervisor. He retired in 1850.

In 1815, he was elected a corresponding member of the Royal Swedish Academy of Sciences.

In his later life, Steven studied the flora of Crimea, where he settled, but he had also collected numerous specimens from the Lower Volga area at the start of his career.

=== Expeditions ===
In the spring of 1800, von Bieberstein and Steven departed from Saint Petersburg to Moscow, where they stayed for several weeks with Christian Friedrich Stephan, the director of the Moscow Apothecary garden and professor of chemistry and botany at the Medical-Surgical Academy.

They made their way to Kizlyar, collecting in Astrakhan, Sarepta, and between the Volga and the Don Rivers.

In 1806, Steven visited the Lower Volga again, including Sarepta, Saratov, Norka and the area between the Volga and Medveditsa Rivers.

In 1807, Steven moved to Simferopol, Crimea, but returned to Sarepta and Kamyshin in 1811, and Astrakhan in 1816.

=== New taxa from the Lower Volga ===
On these excursions he collected material which was described by other botanists. Allium sabulosum was described by Alexander von Bunge, whereas Adonis volgensis and Delphinium cuneatum were described by Augustin Pyramus de Candolle in 1818.

=== Collaborations ===
He was an active member of the Imperial Society of Naturalists of Moscow.

The botanist Robert Lyall said "one of the first naturalists of the age [is] Mr Christian Steven who after having travelled in the Caucasus Georgia and the Crimea has been appointed director of the botanic garden at Nikita on the southern coast where he spends several months in the year".

He met Carl Reinhold Sahlberg when Sahlberg travelled to St. Petersburg in 1813 to collect specimens for Åbo Akademi's Botanical Museum and Gardens.

Steven's letters written in 1828–1863 to professor Alexander von Nordmann are maintained in the archives of Finnish national library. Some letters are also at the central archive of Simferopol and at Geneva library in Switzerland.

== Awards ==
In 1849, to celebrate 50 years of service, he was elected Honourable Member of all Russian Universities and Academies of Sciences

- Order of Saint Anna, Second Class
- Order of St. Vladimir, Third Class (Russia)

== Works ==
- Monographia Pedicularis, 1822.
- Verzeichnis der auf der taurischen Halbinsel wildwachsenden Pflanzen, 1856–1857.
- A review of the success of sericulture, horticulture and wine-making in the midday provinces of Russia (1834-1835). Magazine of the Ministry of Internal Affairs. 1835. T. XV. N 2. P. 301.
- A review of the success of sericulture, horticulture and wine-making in the midday provinces of Russia (1835-1836). Magazine of the Ministry of Internal Affairs. 1836. T. XX. N 4. P. 46.
- A review of the success of sericulture, horticulture and wine-making in the midday provinces of Russia (1836-1837), Magazine of the Ministry of Internal Affairs. 1837. T. XXIII. Part 3. P. 469-471

== Legacy ==
He collected an important herbarium of more than 23,000 species which he donated in 1860 to the Botanical Museum of the University of Helsinki. Other specimens are kept at herbaria LE, MW, and KW.

Steven named the genus Callipeltis and some 30 species, including:

- Allium guttatum
- Colchicum laetum
- Corispermum pallasii
- Crambe cordifolia
- Orchis punctulata
- Quercus hartwissiana
- Tilia dasystyla

IPNI. List of plant names with authority Steven.

== Sources ==
- "Стевен, Христиан" . Brockhaus and Efron Encyclopedic Dictionary (in Russian). 1906.
