= Nikitsky Botanical Garden =

Botanical garden in Crimea

Coordinates: 44.5094°N 34.2328°E

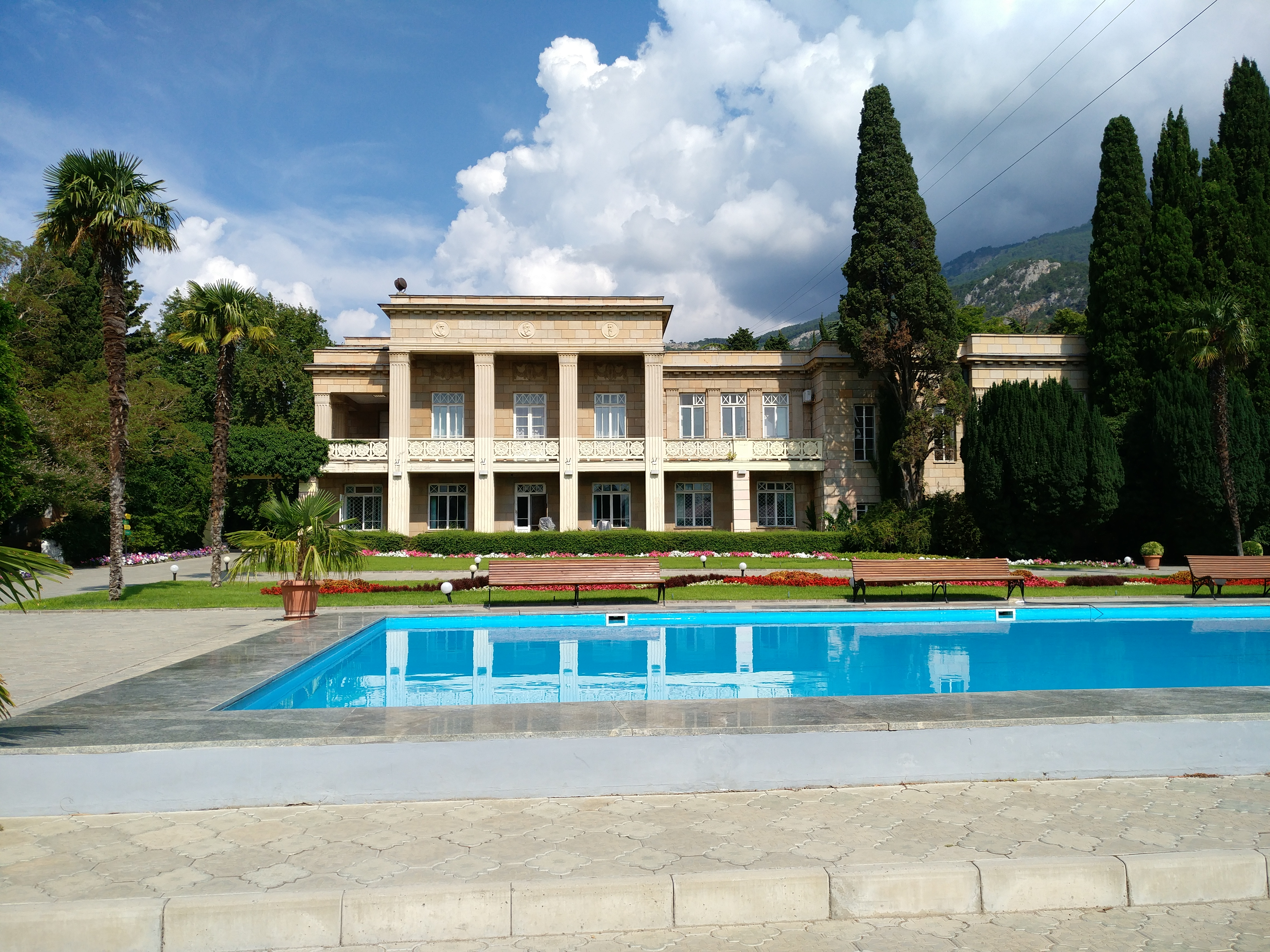
Main building

Nikita Botanical Garden (Ukrainian: Нікітський ботанічний сад; Russian: Никитский ботанический сад) is one of the oldest botanical gardens in Europe. It is located in Crimea, close to Yalta, by the shores of the Black Sea.

== History ==
It was founded in 1812 and named after the settlement Nikita, Crimea, in the Russian Empire.

Its founder and first director was Christian von Steven. The garden and its collections were greatly expanded by Nicolai Anders von Hartwiss, who was director from 1827 to 1860.

== Description ==
The total area is 11 square kilometres (4.2 sq mi). It is a scientific research centre, a producer of saplings and seeds, and a tourist attraction. The garden opened a representative office in Damascus in 2022.

The garden was the part of the Ukrainian Academy of Agrarian Sciences. It has subsidiaries in Crimea and Kherson Oblast. Its collection counts over 50,000 species, sorts and hybrides. Its scientific work consists in study of natural flora, collection of gene fund, selection and introduction of new agricultural plants for southern Ukraine, Russia, and other countries.

== Gallery ==
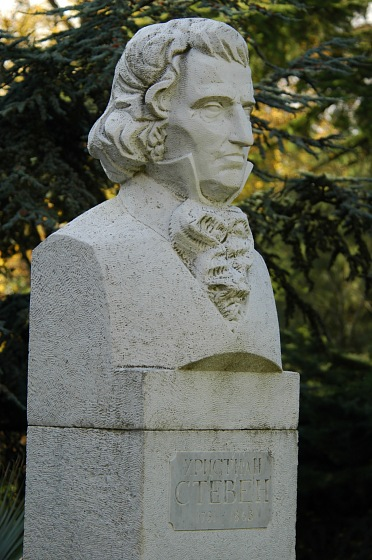
Monument to Christian von Steven

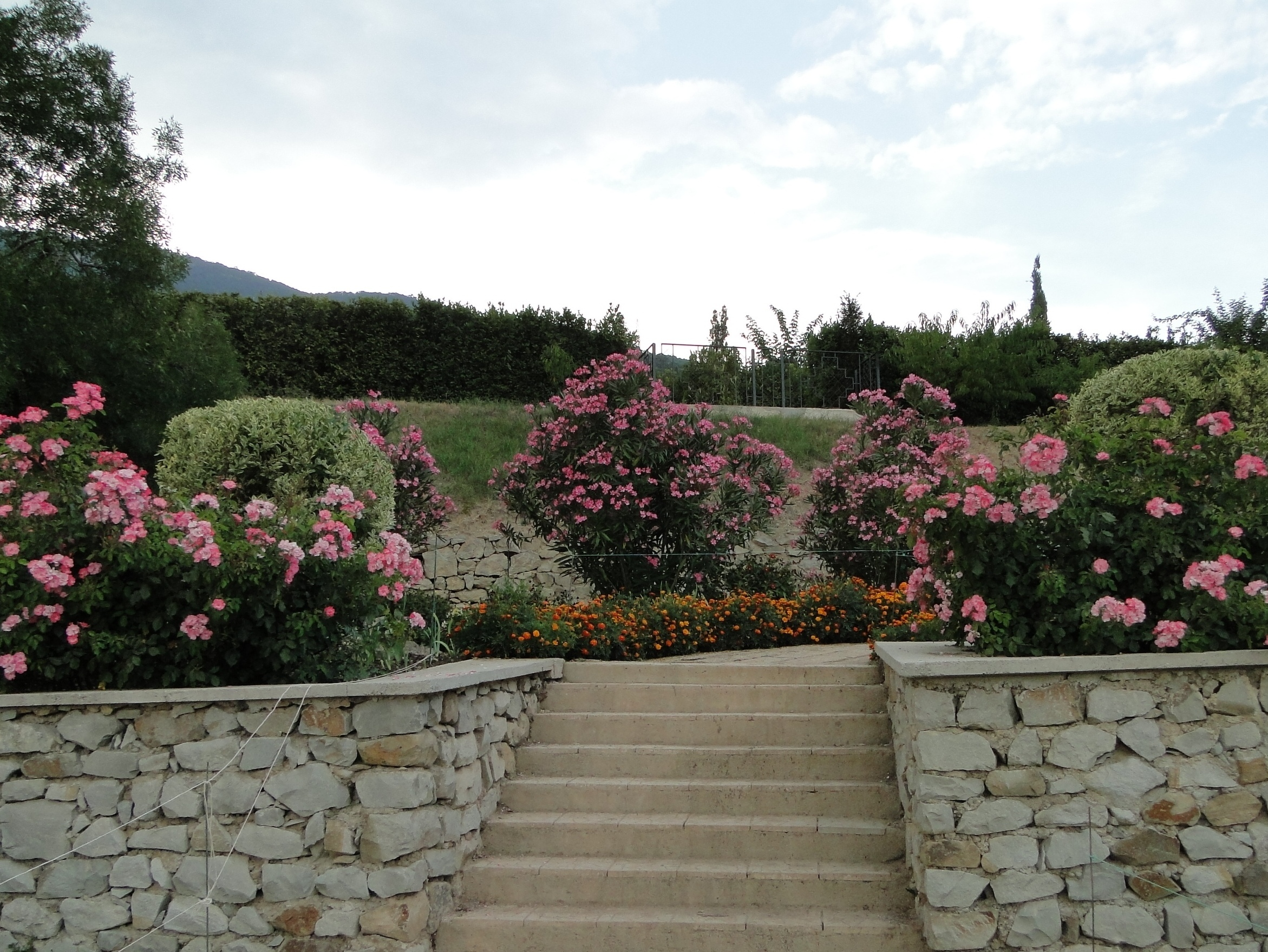
Oleander shrubs

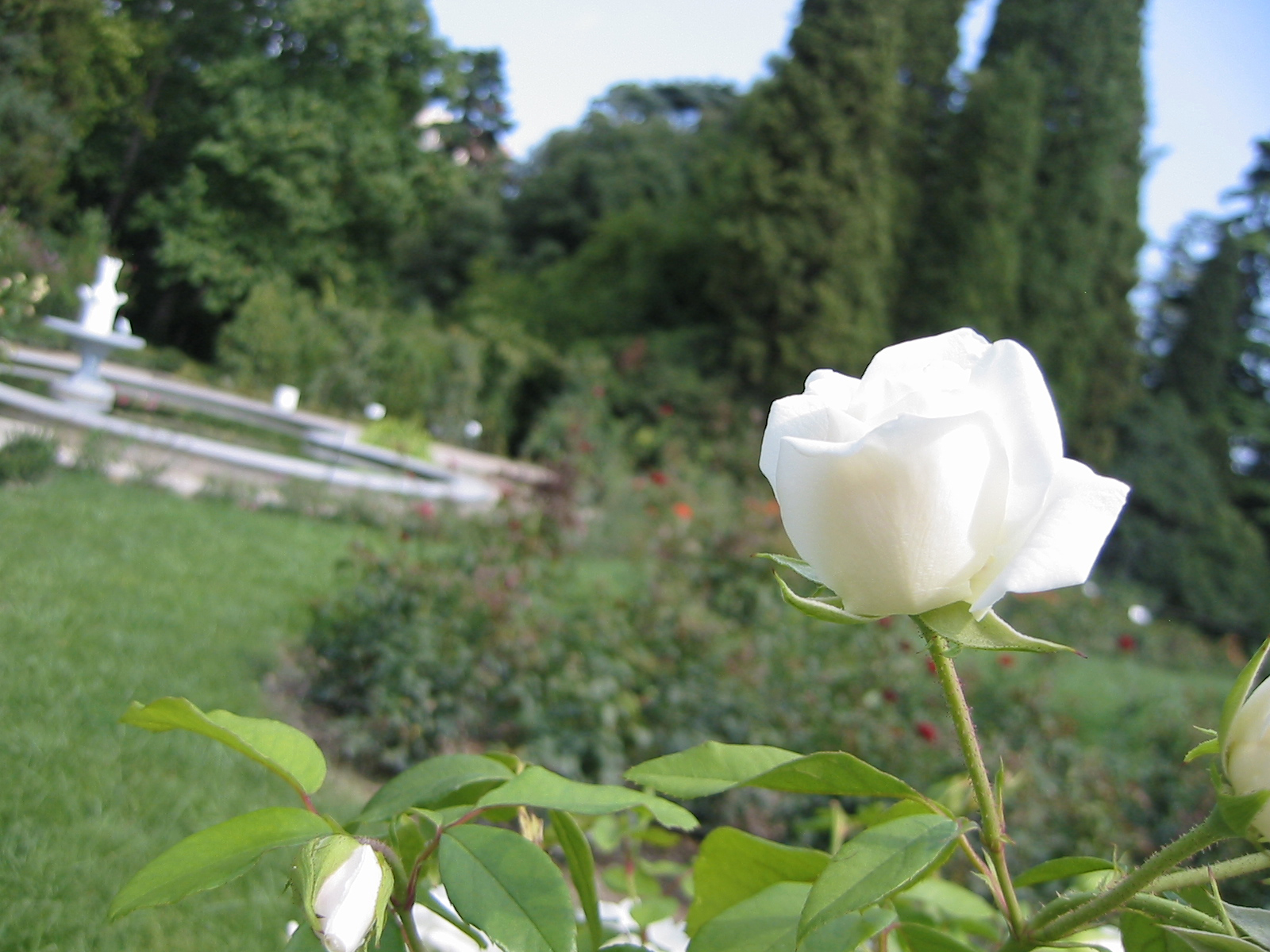
White roses

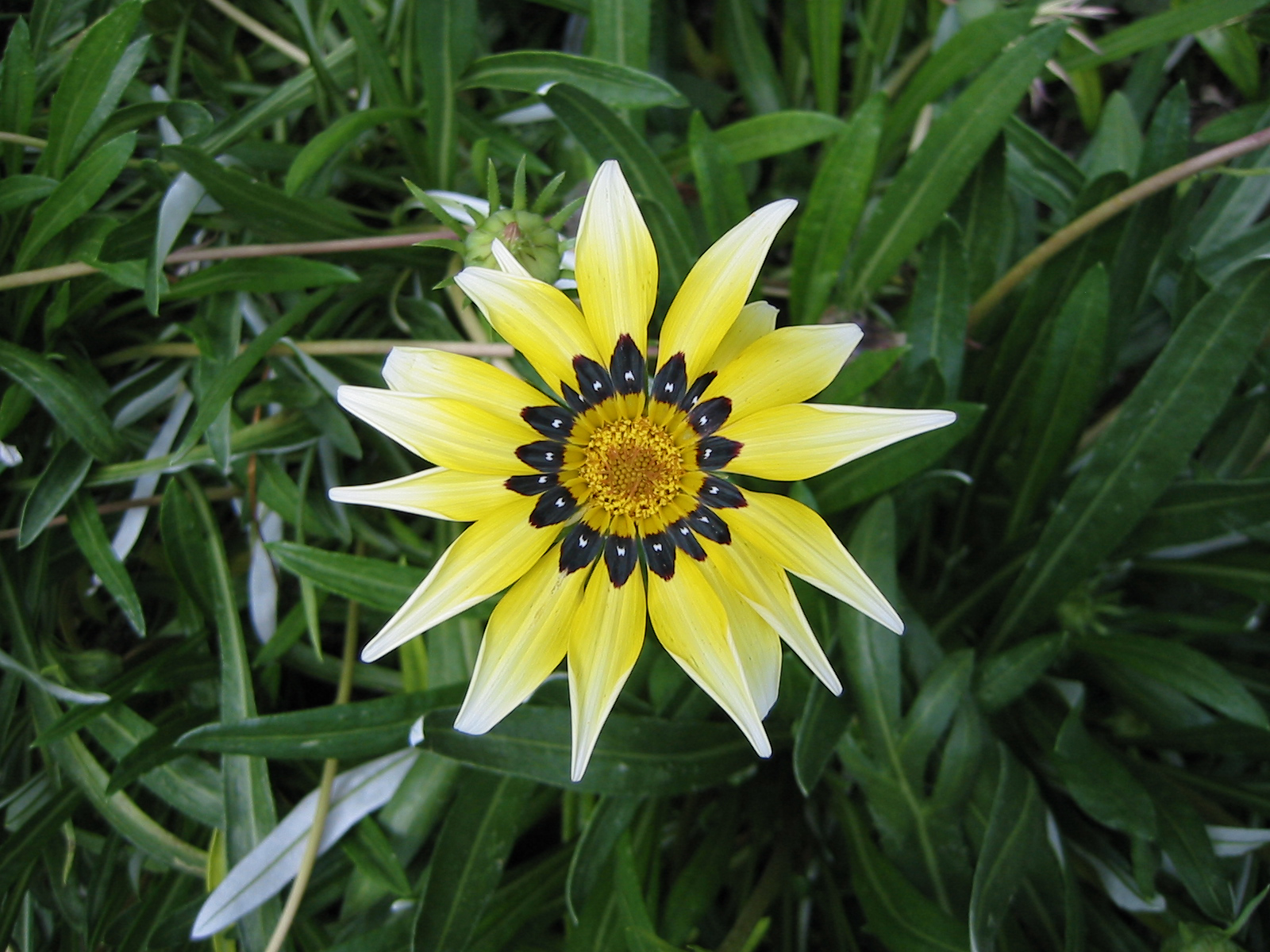
Passionfruit

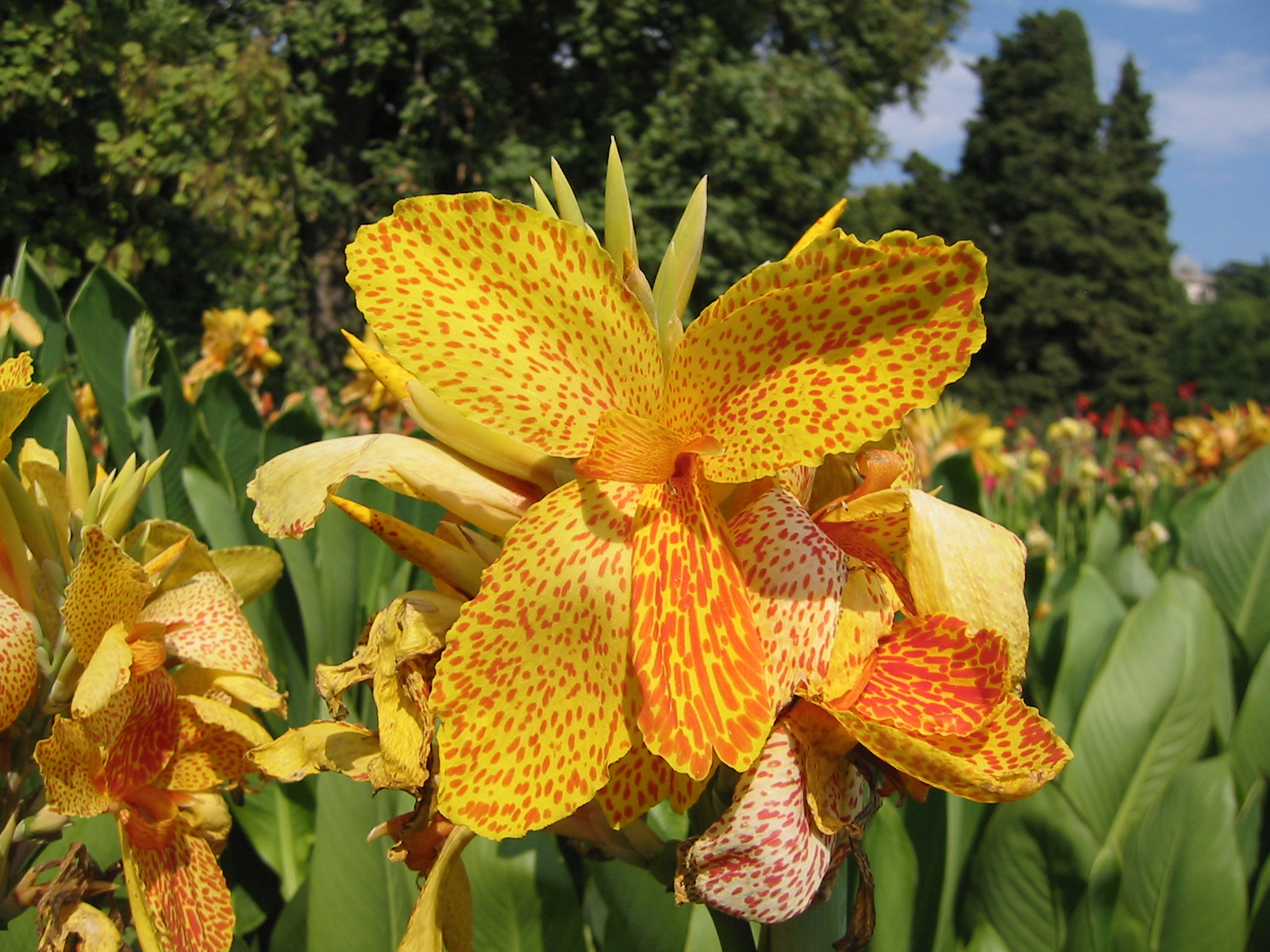
Lilies

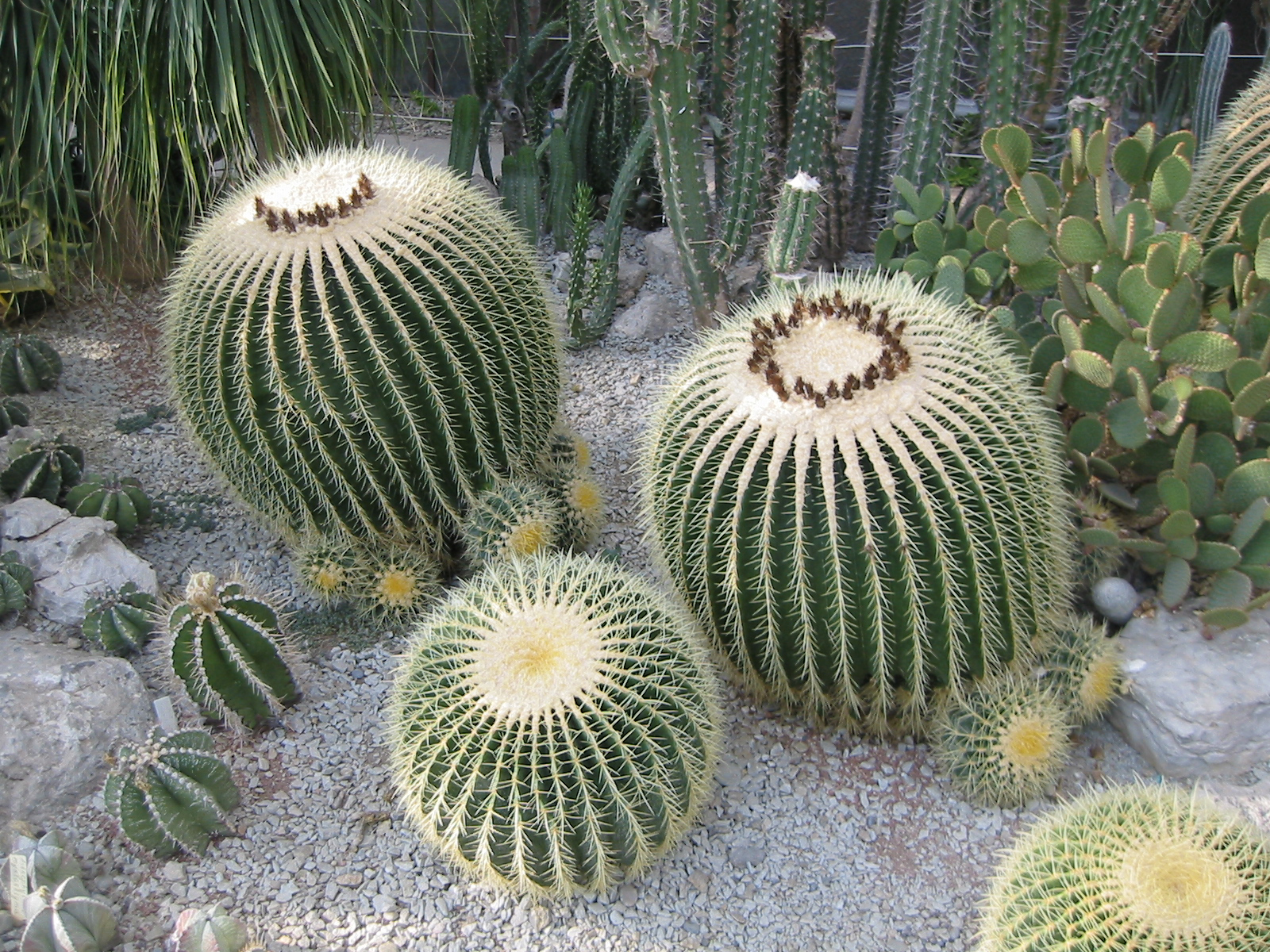
Cacti

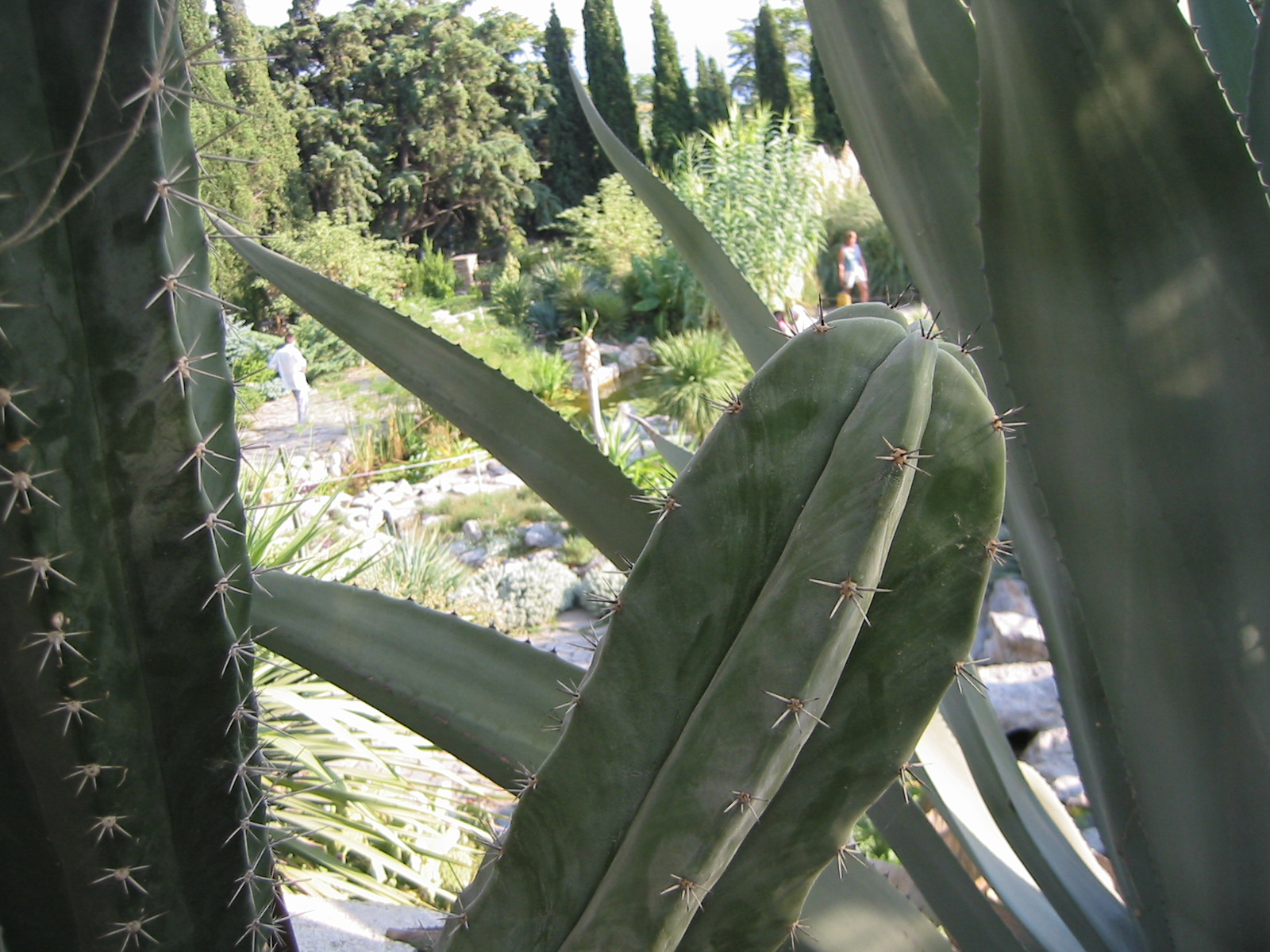
Succulents
