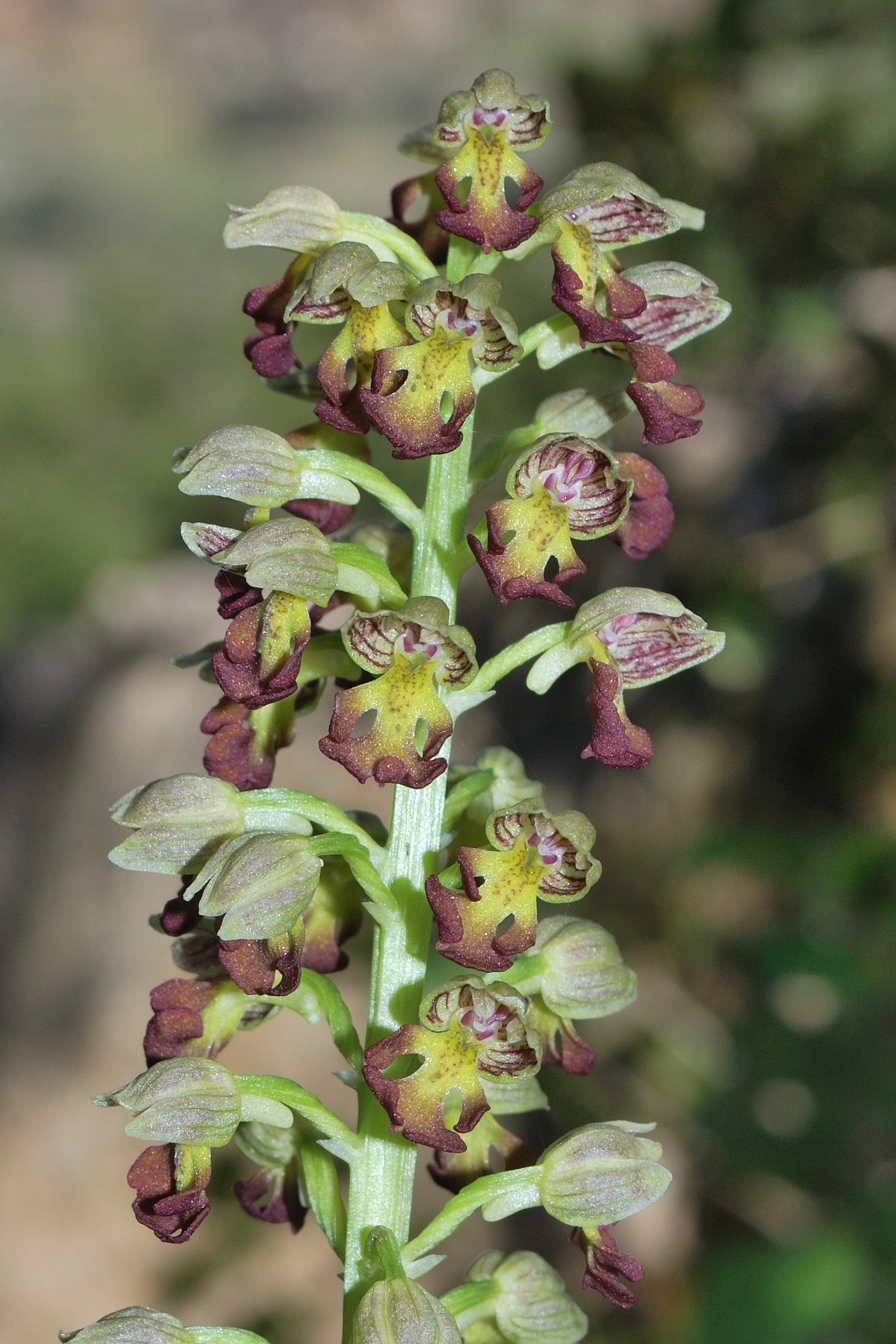
- Flower of Orchis punctulata

Scientific classification
- Kingdom: Plantae
- Clade: Embryophytes
- Clade: Tracheophytes
- Clade: Angiosperms
- Clade: Monocots
- Order: Asparagales
- Family: Orchidaceae
- Subfamily: Orchidoideae
- Genus: Orchis
- Species: O. punctulata

Binomial name
- Orchis punctulata Steven ex Lindl.

Synonyms
- Orchis steveniana Comper. ex Lév.; Orchis sepulchralis Boiss. & Heldr.; Orchis schelkownikowii Woronow; Orchis punctulata ssp. sepulchralis (Boiss. & Heldr.) Soó; Aceras fragrans Kotschy ex Soó; Orchis punctulata ssp. schelkownikowii (Woronow) Soó; Orchis punctulata var. sepulchralis (Boiss. & Heldr.) Kreutz

= Orchis punctulata =

Small-dotted orchis

Species of orchid

Orchis punctulata, the small-dotted orchis, is a species of orchid. It is native to southeastern Europe (Greece, the part of Turkey in Europe known as East Thrace, and possibly Bulgaria), Crimea in eastern Europe, western Asia (Cyprus, East Aegean Islands, Iran, Iraq, Lebanon, Syria, israel, Palestine, and Turkey), and both the North Caucasus and Transcaucasia.
