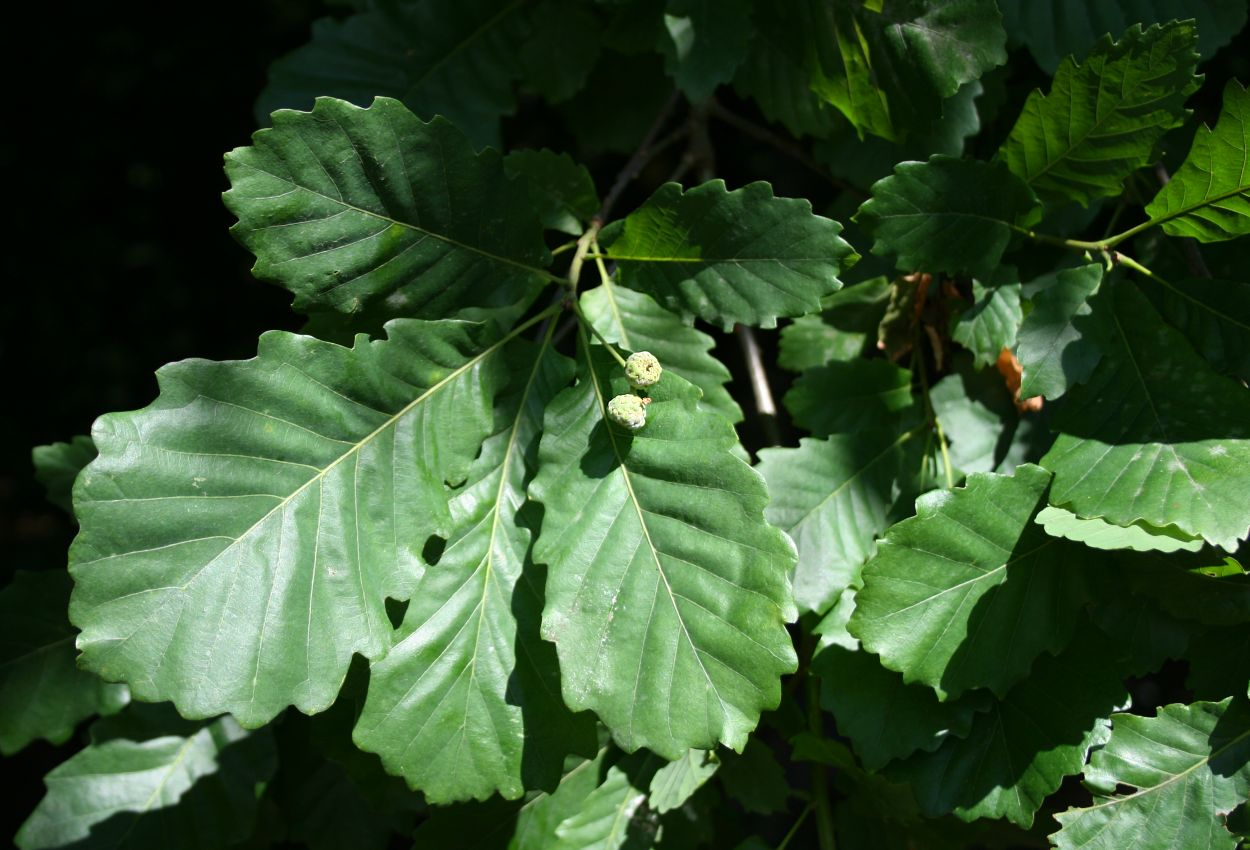

Conservation status
- Data Deficient (IUCN 3.1)

Scientific classification
- Kingdom: Plantae
- Clade: Embryophytes
- Clade: Tracheophytes
- Clade: Spermatophytes
- Clade: Angiosperms
- Clade: Eudicots
- Clade: Rosids
- Order: Fagales
- Family: Fagaceae
- Genus: Quercus
- Subgenus: Quercus subg. Quercus
- Section: Quercus sect. Quercus
- Species: Q. hartwissiana

Binomial name
- Quercus hartwissiana Steven

Synonyms
- List: Quercus ajudaghiensis Steven ex G.Kirchn.; Quercus armeniaca Kotschy; Quercus armeniaca f. macrocarpa Medw.; Quercus armeniaca f. typica Medw.; Quercus hartwissiana var. macrocarpa (Medw.) A.Camus; Quercus hartwissiana var. typica (Medw.) A.Camus; Quercus kassanogluanensis Kotschy; Quercus lasistana Kotschy ex A.DC.; Quercus robur var. armeniaca A.DC.; Quercus stranjensis Turrill

= Quercus hartwissiana =

Species of oak tree

Quercus hartwissiana, the Strandzha oak (Bulgarian: странджански дъб), is a species of oak, native to southeastern Bulgaria, northern Asia Minor along the Black Sea, and the Caucasus. It was described by the Finnish-born Russian botanist and entomologist Christian von Steven in 1857.

== Description ==
Quercus hartwissiana is a large deciduous tree, reaching heights of 35 metres (115 feet), with umbrella-shaped crown and ascending branches. The bark is thick, finely furrowed, almost black. The shoots are dark reddish-brown and bald. The buds are broad, oval or almost round, 6 to 7 millimetres (1/4 to 9/32 inch) long, with short burnished scales. The petiole is 1.5 to 2 centimetres (1/2 to 3/4 in) long. The leaves are 12 to 14 cm (4 1/2 to 5 1/2 in) long and 7 to 9 cm wide, slightly convex in the base, and have seven to ten pairs of fairly regular, short, rounded to pointed lobes. The leaf veins are all directed into the lobes of the leaf, not into the indentations between them. The top of the leaf is bright green, the underside is dull, with a dark brown shading, with fine fleece and somewhat longer reddish hairs along the leaf veins, or in the angles between them.

On a petiole with a length of 2 to 7 cm, there are one to four acorns. Their fruits mature in the first year. The acorns are 2.5 to 3 cm long and 1.2 to 1.5 cm wide, the fruit cups measure 1.5 cm in length and 2 cm in diameter. The scales of the fruit cup are almost full to the top.

== Epithet ==
The specific epithet hartwissiana is in honour of Russian botanist Nicolai Anders von Hartwiss.

== Distribution ==
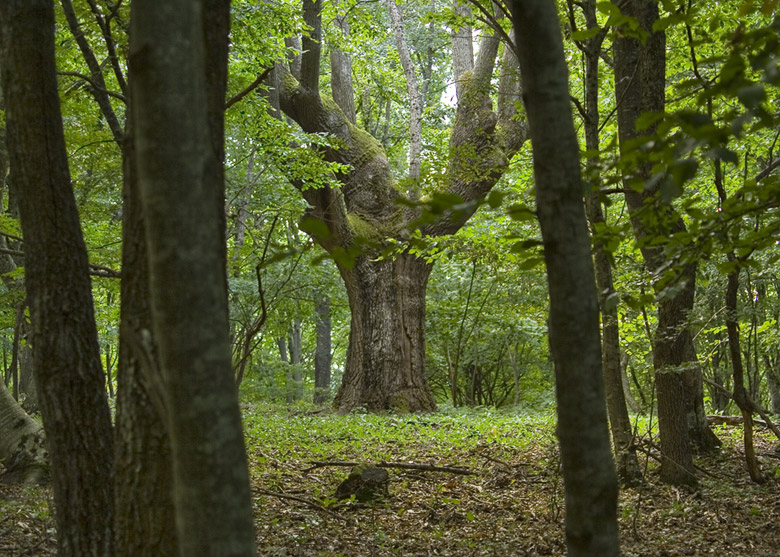
A Quercus hartwissiana habitat in Strandzha Nature Park, Bulgaria

Quercus hartwissiana is found in the Euxine–Colchic deciduous forests ecoregion, in the temperate broadleaf and mixed forests biome along the Black Sea from the south-easternmost parts of the Balkan Peninsula along northern Asia Minor to western Caucasus. It grows in Bulgaria, Turkey, Georgia and Russia. In Bulgaria Quercus hartwissiana grows in Strandzha Nature Park and is distributed in the dense forest ecotype and the karst or xelophilous ecotype. In Strandzha it grows near river valleys, especially those of Veleka and Rezovo. There it is mixed with Carpinus betulus, Fagus orientalis, Torminalis glaberrima, Quercus pubescens, Quercus cerris, Quercus frainetto, Carpinus orientalis and the shrubs Cistus creticus and Daphne pontica.

In Russia it occurs in the basin of the Mzymta River and in the North Caucasus. In Georgia it is known from Abkhazia, Racha-Lechkhumi and Kvemo Svaneti, Samegrelo, Imereti, Guria and Adjara; in eastern Georgia it is now known only from Kakheti.

It always occurs in mixed forests along with other tree species. Quercus hartwissiana prefers warm and humid climate and grows on fresh to moist soil from the lowland to an elevation of 1,200 to 1,500 m (3,900 to 4,900 ft). It is a pre-glacial relict and is considered to be the ancestor of Quercus robur and Quercus petraea.

== Fossil record ==
Fossils of Quercus hartwissiana have been described from the fossil flora of Kızılcahamam district in Turkey, which is of early Pliocene age.

== See also ==
- List of Quercus species
- Euxine-Colchic deciduous forests
- Strandzha Nature Park
