= Strict nature reserve =

Highest category of protected area recognised by the WCPA

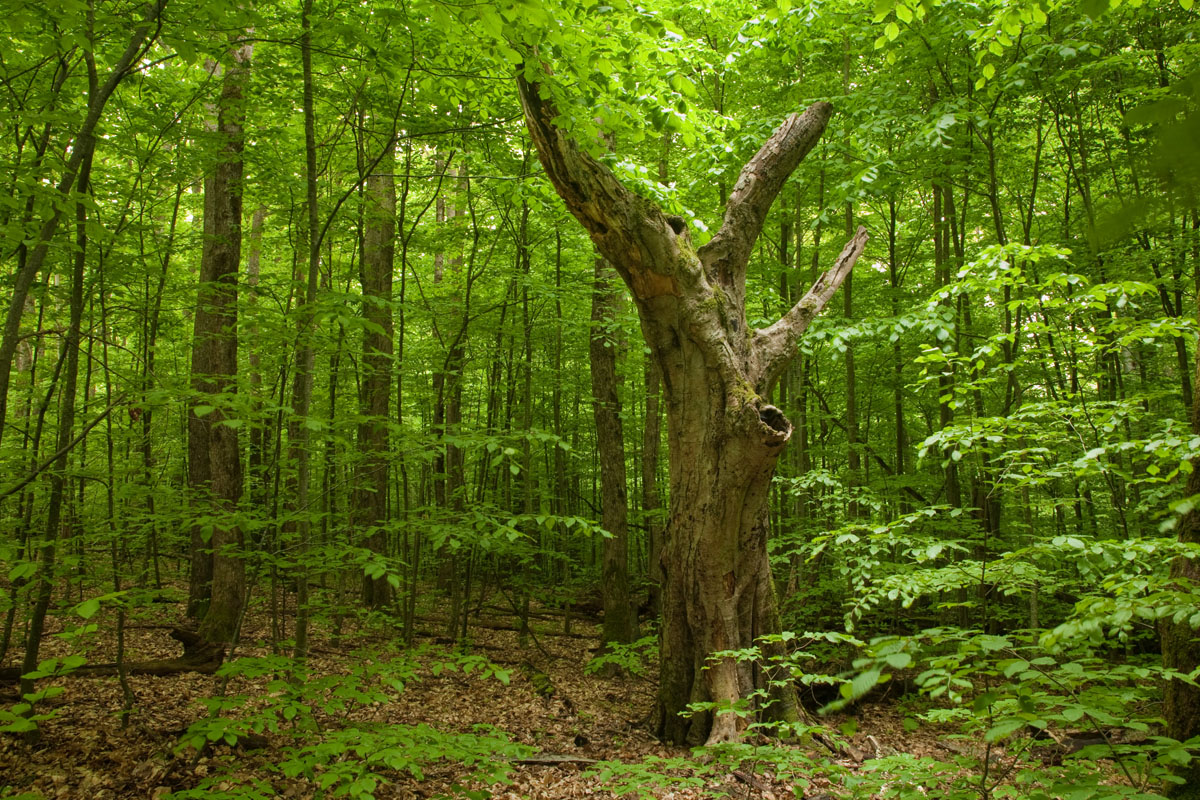
Uzunbodzhak in Bulgaria

A strict nature reserve (IUCN category Ia) or wilderness area (IUCN category Ib) is the highest category of protected area recognised by the World Commission on Protected Areas (WCPA), a body which is part of the International Union for Conservation of Nature (IUCN). These category I areas are the most stringently protected natural landscapes.

== Purpose ==
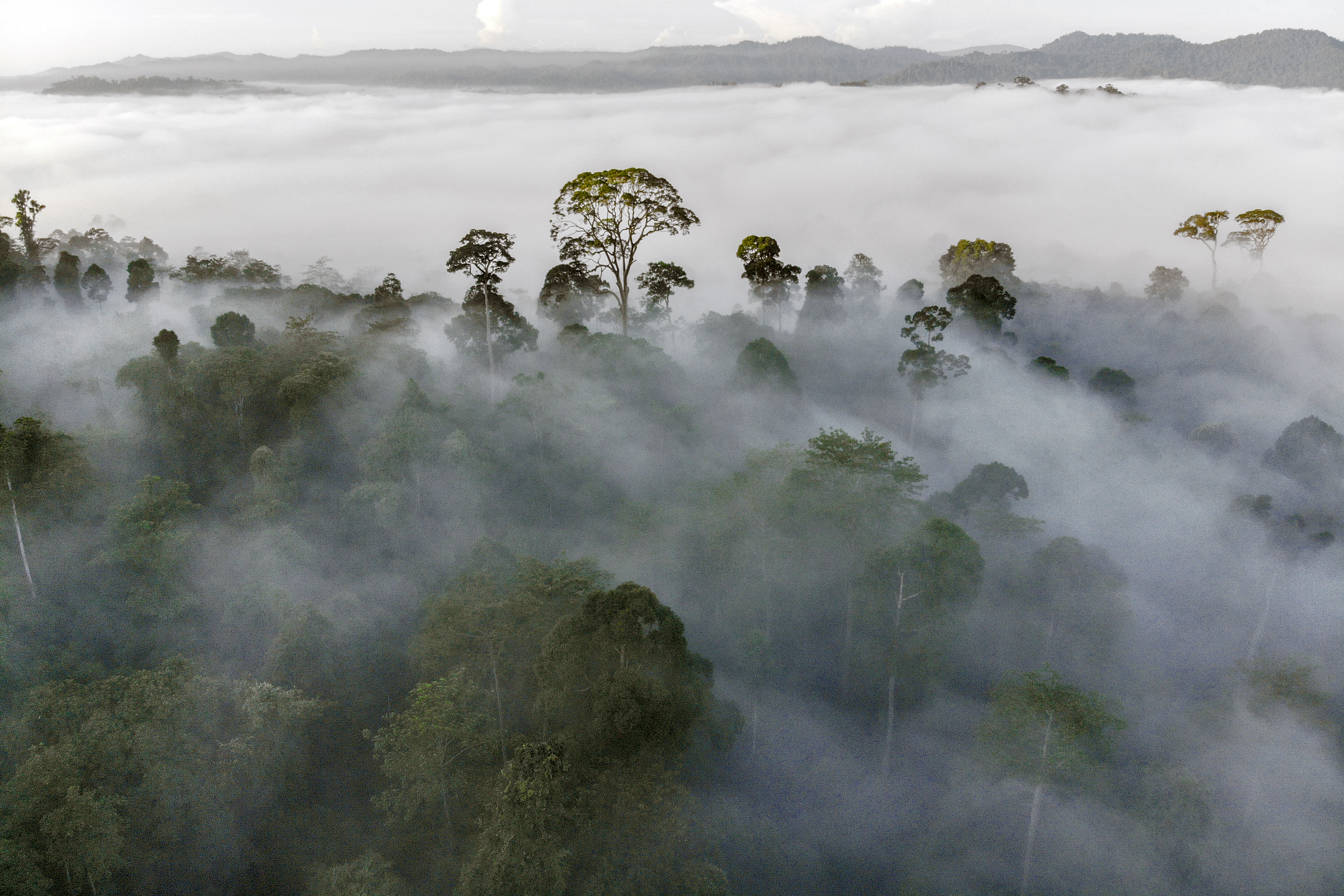
Danum Valley Conservation Area, Sabah, Malaysia

Strict nature reserves and wilderness areas are protected areas that are created and managed mainly for the purposes of research or for the protection of large, unspoiled areas of wilderness. Their primary purpose is the preservation of biodiversity and as essential reference areas for scientific work and environmental monitoring.

- IUCN category Ia strict nature reserves are generally established exclusively for scientific field work.
- IUCN category Ib wilderness areas are defined as "large unmodified or slightly modified areas, retaining their natural character and influence, without permanent or significant human habitation, which are protected and managed so as to preserve their natural condition".

Usage and intrusion are strictly controlled. As a result, strict nature reserves often form the core zones, with wilderness areas acting as a buffer zone, similar to the concept used for national parks (which are IUCN category II), but also for UNESCO World Heritage Sites.

== By country ==
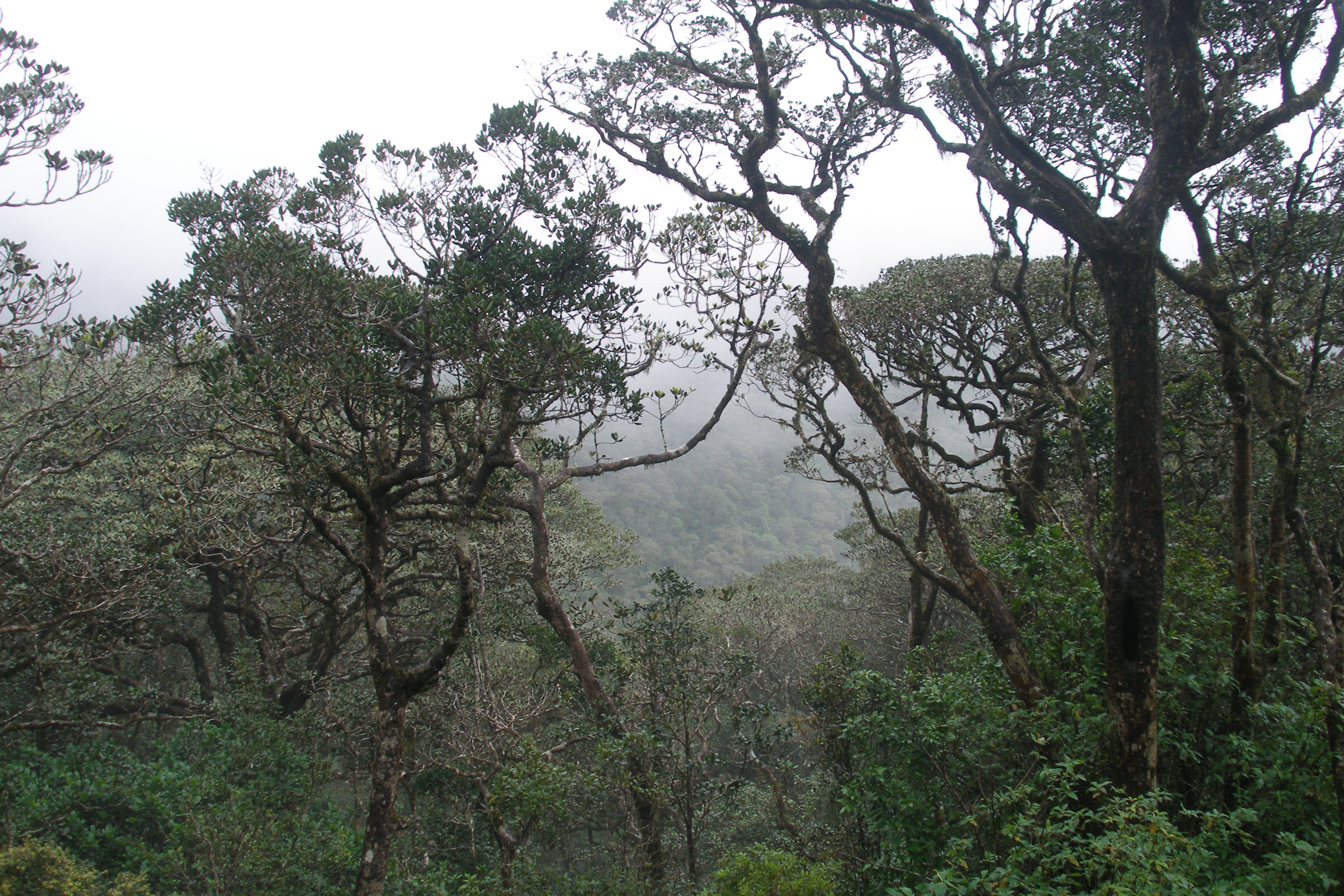
Peak Wilderness Sanctuary, Sri Lanka

The complete list of countries (as of 2016) with IUCN category 1b sites can be found in the Management Guidelines for IUCN Category 1b (wilderness) Protected Areas. The most up-to-date resource is the Protected Planet World Database on Protected Areas, which can be searched by many filters including IUCN category levels and country.

=== Australia ===
Of all protected areas, two-thirds are considered strictly protected (IUCN categories I to IV), and the rest is mostly managed resources protected area (IUCN category VI). Over 43% of the protected area in Australia is publicly owned and managed by the Australian government or state and territory governments. The second-largest component of protected areas are the Indigenous Protected Areas, at over 44% and growing as of February 2022.

=== Austria ===
In Austria, only one area has been designated as an IUCN category I protected area:

- Urwald Rothwald (IUCN Ia) in the Wildnisgebiet Dürrenstein (Ib), Lower Austrian Eisenwurzen

=== British Overseas Territories ===
Parts of Diego Garcia and other islands in the British Indian Ocean Territory are protected as strict nature reserves.

=== Finland ===
Strict nature reserves (luonnonpuisto) are specific areas on state-owned lands in Finland which have been established by law for scientific reasons. Their primary purpose is the conservation of nature and research and "are to be permanently preserved undisturbed in as close to their natural state as possible." The regulations for the nature reserves are much stricter than those for the national parks of Finland. It is usually not permitted to travel inside the areas, although some areas have trails open for the public. The strict nature reserves cover a total area of 1,530 km^{2}.

There are a total of 19 strict nature reserves in Finland. As of 2025, all of them are managed by the Metsähallitus.

=== France ===
Officially created in the 1950s, Integral Biological Reserves (French: Réserves biologiques intégrales, RBI) were dedicated to man free ecosystem evolution, on the contrary of Managed Biological reserves (French: Réserves biologiques dirigées, RBD) where a specific management is applied to conserve vulnerable species or threatened habitats.

Integral Biological Reserves occurs in French State Forests or City Forests and are therefore managed by the National Forests Office. In such reserves, all harvests coupe are forbidden excepted exotic species elimination or track safety works to avoid fallen tree risk to visitors (already existing tracks in or on the edge of the reserve).

At the end of 2014, there were 60 Integral Biological Reserves in French State Forests for a total area of 111,082 ha (1,110.82 km^{2}; 274,490 acres) and 10 in City Forests for a total of 2,835 ha (28.35 km^{2}; 7,010 acres).

=== Germany ===
The German federal government's national strategy for biological diversity up to 2020 published in 2007 set the aim of allowing 2% of the area of Germany to develop naturally and in an undisturbed way into wilderness areas.

=== United States ===
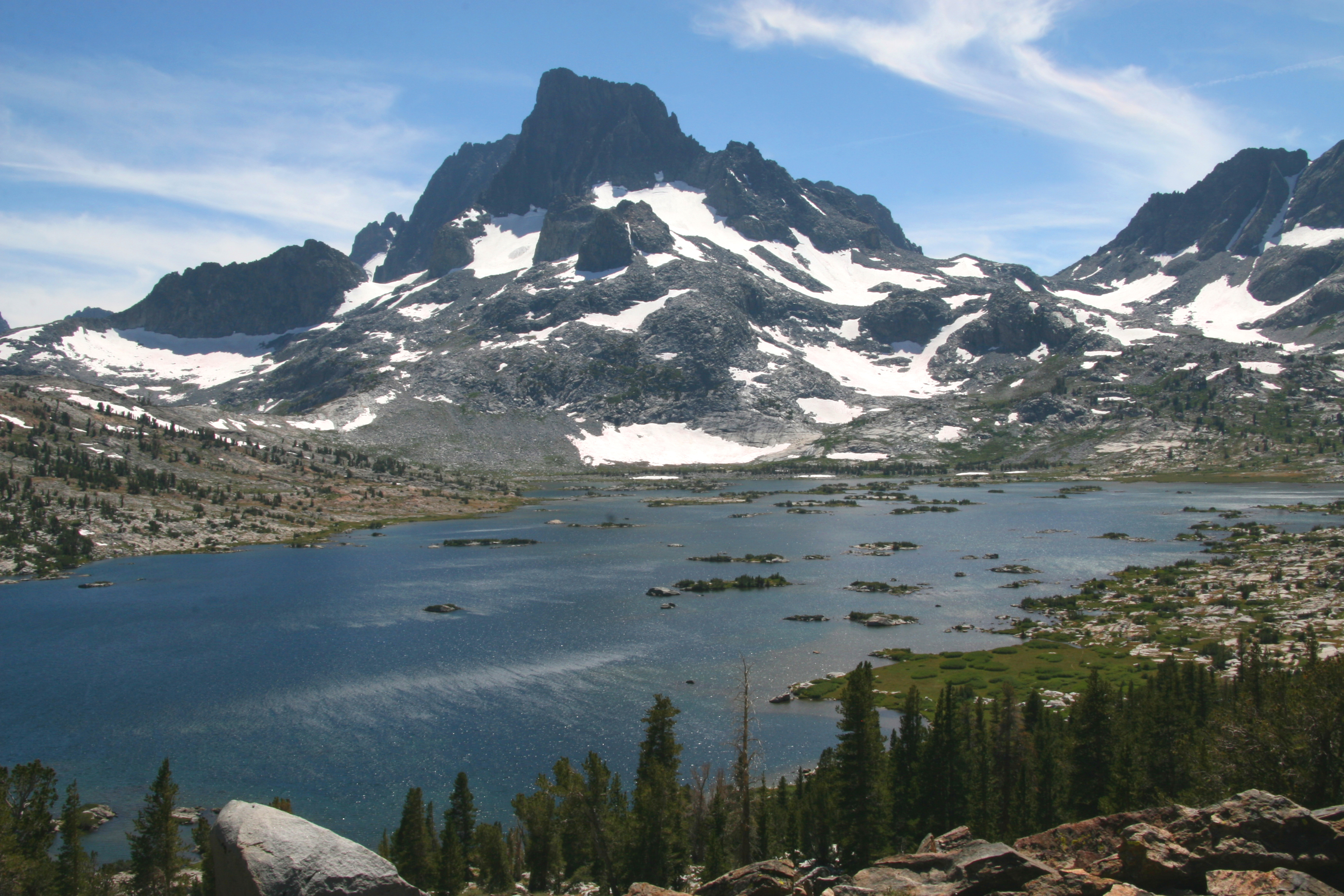
Banner Peak above Thousand Island Lake in Ansel Adams Wilderness, United States

In the U.S. wilderness areas (NWPS) are the strictest category of protected area. They are designated by law in accordance with the Wilderness Act of 1964 by the United States Congress. They must be large enough to adequately preserve their resources and may only be entered on foot, by canoe or on horseback. Limited exceptions are the extensive areas of wilderness in Alaska. There are over 800 recognised wilderness areas.

== Sources ==
- Nigel Dudley (25 September 2012). Guidelines for applying protected area management categories (2008, pdf in en, fr, es). IUCN. ISBN 978-2-8317-1086-0.
- Casson, S. et al. (Ed.s). (2016). Wilderness Protected Areas: Management Guidelines for IUCN Category 1b (wilderness) Protected Areas ISBN 978-2-8317-1817-0
