= Rezovo (river) =

Rezovo River
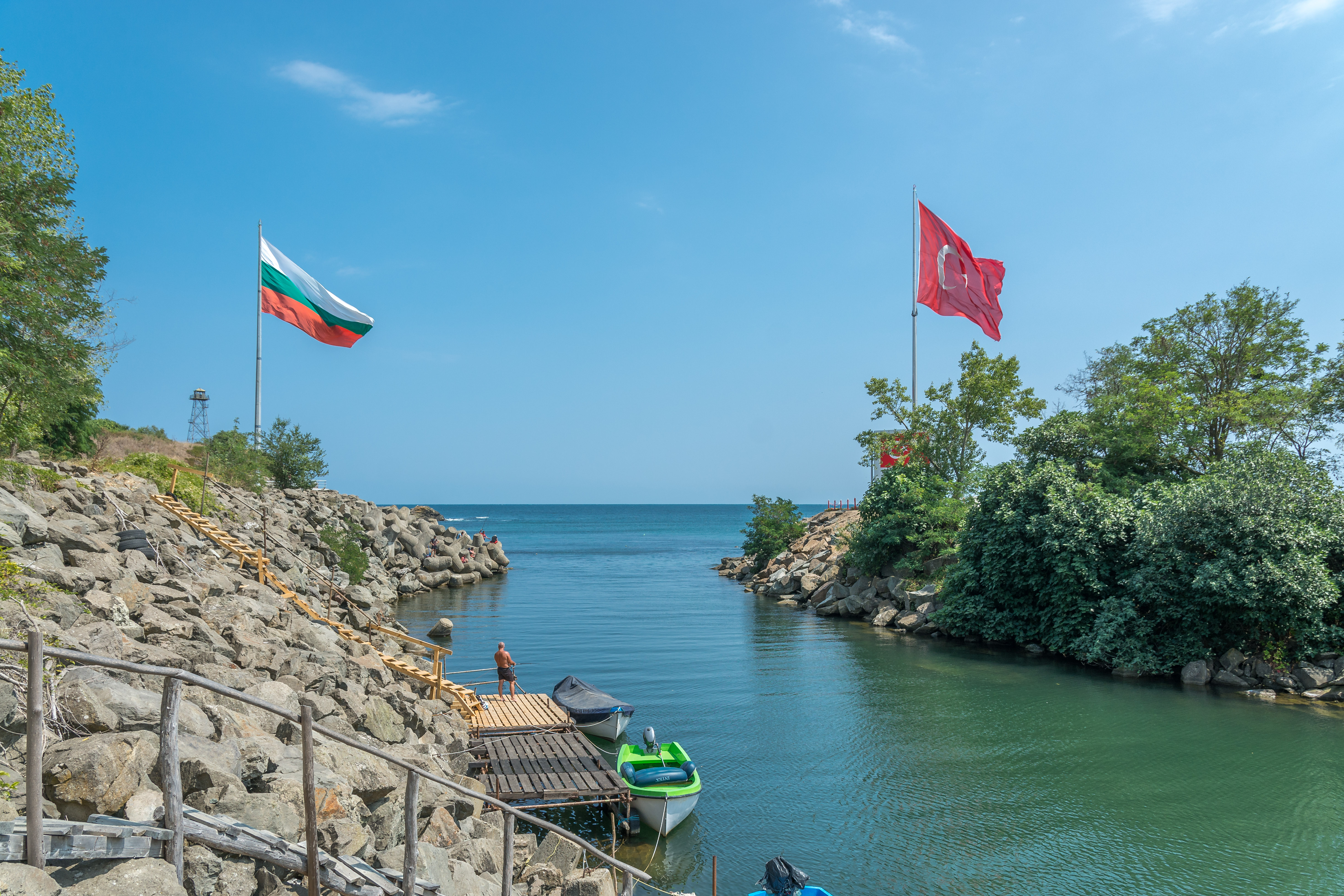
- The Bulgarian–Turkish border at the Rezovo River mouth
- Native name: Резовска река (Bulgarian); Mutludere (Turkish)

Location
- Country: Bulgaria, Turkey

Physical characteristics
- Source
  - location: Strandzha mountains, Turkey
  - coordinates: 41°57′08″N 27°16′12″E
  - elevation: 666 m (2,185 ft)
- Mouth
  - location: Black Sea, Bulgaria–Turkey border
  - coordinates: 41°58′59″N 28°1′46″E
- Length: 112 km (70 mi)
- Basin size: 739 km^{2} (285 sq mi)

The Rezovo (also Rezovska reka, Rezvaya and Rezve; Bulgarian: Резовска река [ˈrɛzofskɐ rɛˈka]; Turkish: Mutludere [mutˈludeɾe]) is a river in the extreme southeast of Bulgaria and northernmost part of European Turkey. Its length is 112 km, of which the uppermost 23 km are in Turkey and 89 km form the Bulgaria–Turkey border.

The name Rezovo is thought to have originated from the mythical king of Thrace Rhesus.

== Geography ==
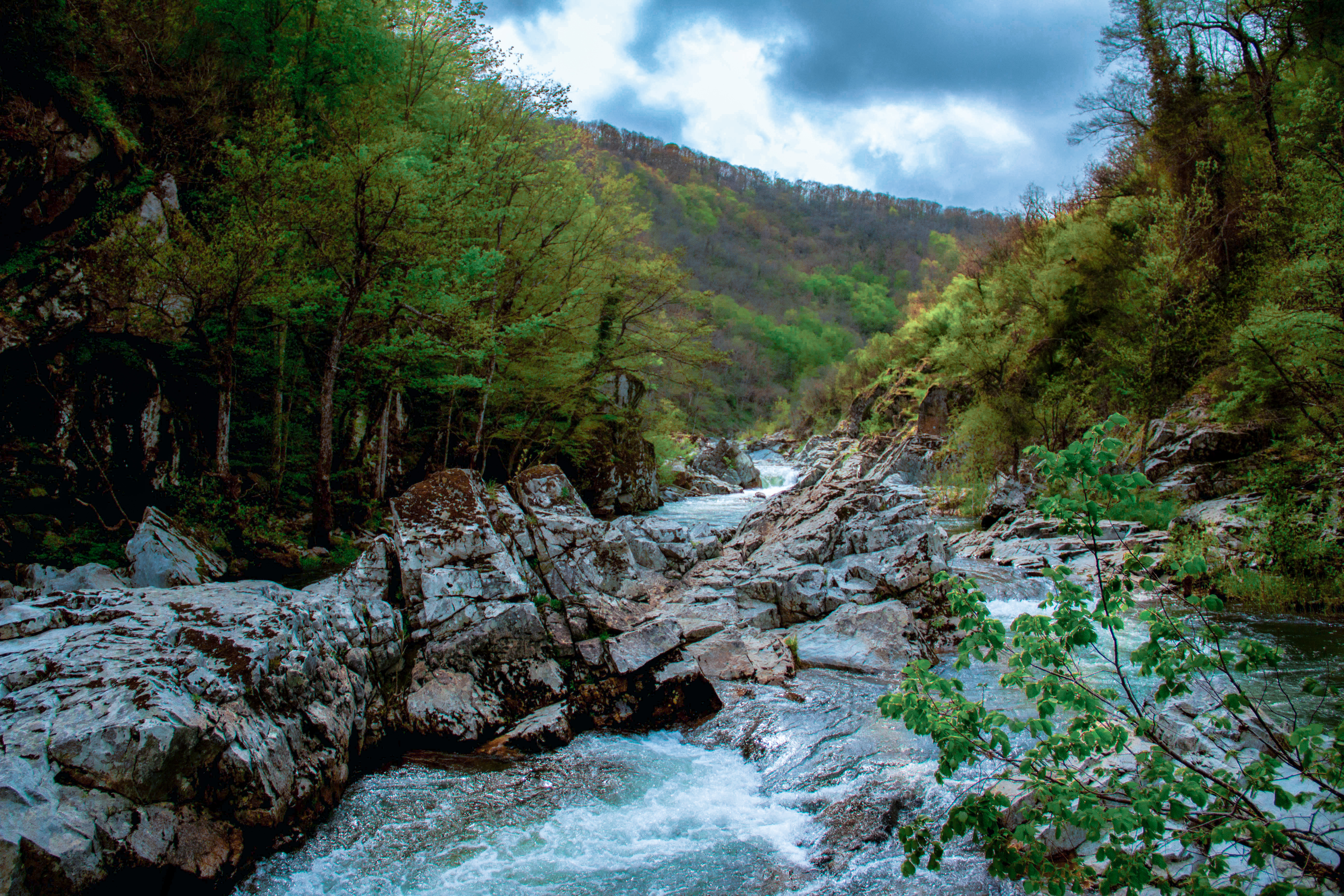
Rezovo River, Strandzha Nature Park

The source of the Rezovo is in the Turkish part of the Strandzha mountain range at an altitude of 666 m east of the town of Kofçaz under the name of Paspalderesi, which is considered its main stem. It flows in southeastern direction until the Armağan Reservoir and then turns east until the confluence with the river Velika at an altitude of 291 m, which is considered the beginning of the river proper. The Rezovo then bends north and in 3 km reaches the Bulgaria–Turkey border at the mouth of its left tributary the Delievska reka some 8 km south of the town of Malko Tarnovo. From there the river forms the frontier between the two countries, flowing in general eastern direction in a deep meandering valley covered with dense oak forests. It flows into the Black Sea at the Bulgarian village of Rezovo. That location constitutes the southernmost point of the Bulgarian Black Sea Coast and the northernmost point of the Turkish one.

The Rezovo drainage basin covers a territory of 739 km^{2}, of which 555 km^{2} are in Turkey, and 184 km^{2} in Bulgaria. It borders the basins of the Veleka to the north; the Maritsa to the southwest along the crest of the Strandzha, and those of several small rivers flowing directly into the Black Sea to the south. The Rezovo has strong inter- and intra-annual variability. High water is in January–April; during that period the river receives 64% of its annual discharge. Low water is in late summer, with only 6% of the annual waterflow running in July–September. The climate is transitional Mediterranean under the influence of the three nearby seas, the Black, Marmara and Aegean Seas. Maximum rainfall is in November-December; the minimum is in August. Temperatures rarely fall below freezing in winter.

The river flows through a sparsely populated region in Kırklareli Province of Turkey and Burgas Province of Bulgaria. There are only three villages along its course, Geçitağzı and Dereköy in the upper reaches in Turkey, and Rezovo at the mouth in Bulgaria's Tsarevo Municipality.

== Ecology ==
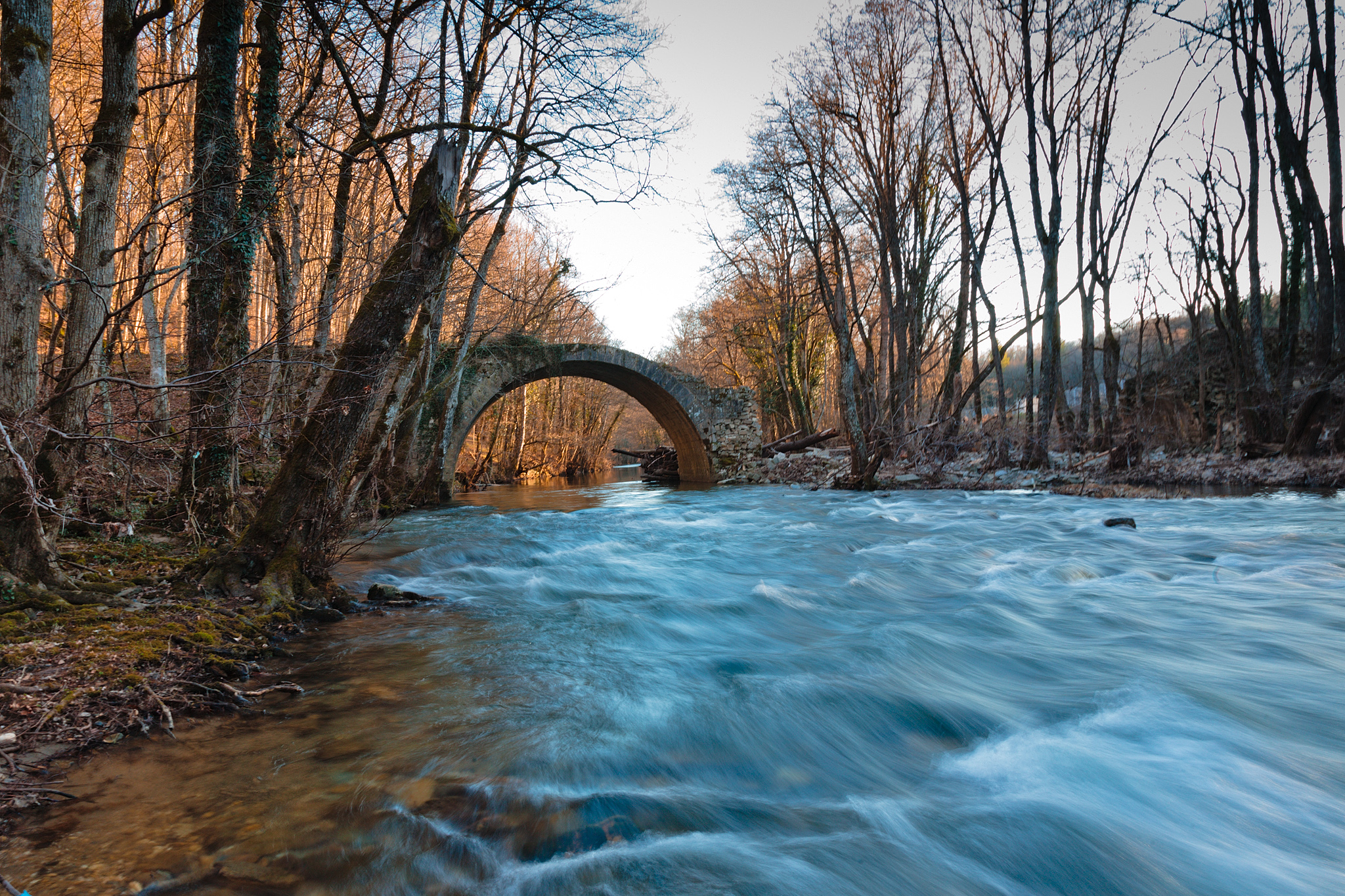
Valchanov Bridge between Bulgaria and Turkey

The whole river basin within Bulgaria is part of Strandzha Nature Park, the largest protected territory in the country, that includes the Uzunbodzhak along the Rezovo's left banks, which is a UNESCO Biosphere Reserve. Along with the neighbouring Veleka river basin to the north, it forms the Veleka–Rezovska wetland complex of national importance. Due to its status as a border river, the Rezovo is still not fully studied.

The river valley is covered with dense forests of Oriental beech (Fagus orientalis) and oaks, including the rare Strandzha oak (Quercus hartwissiana). The Mediterranean maquis shrublands are widespread on its rocky inclines and are the habitat of a number of reptiles, including European ratsnake, Montpellier snake and eastern slowworm.

Faster and colder compared to the Veleka, the Rezovo River shares many similarities with the former in terms of the ichthyofauna, including local endemic fishes, such as Pontic spined loach, Black Sea bleak, Bulgarian minnow, Thracian spirlin and Bulgarian barbel, as well as endangered species like Black Sea roach, Pontic shad and Azov shad. The river trout is abundant; other common fish species include common carp, European chub, common gudgeon, etc.

== Bulgaria–Turkey riverine border ==
The border at the Rezovo's mouth was the subject of a minor territorial dispute between Bulgaria and Turkey, which was settled in the 1990s. As a result of an agreement between the two countries of 6 May 1992 (ratified by Bulgaria in 1998), Bulgaria received a small land area of several square kilometres in the Rezovo Bay in return for water area in the continental shelf.

== Gallery ==
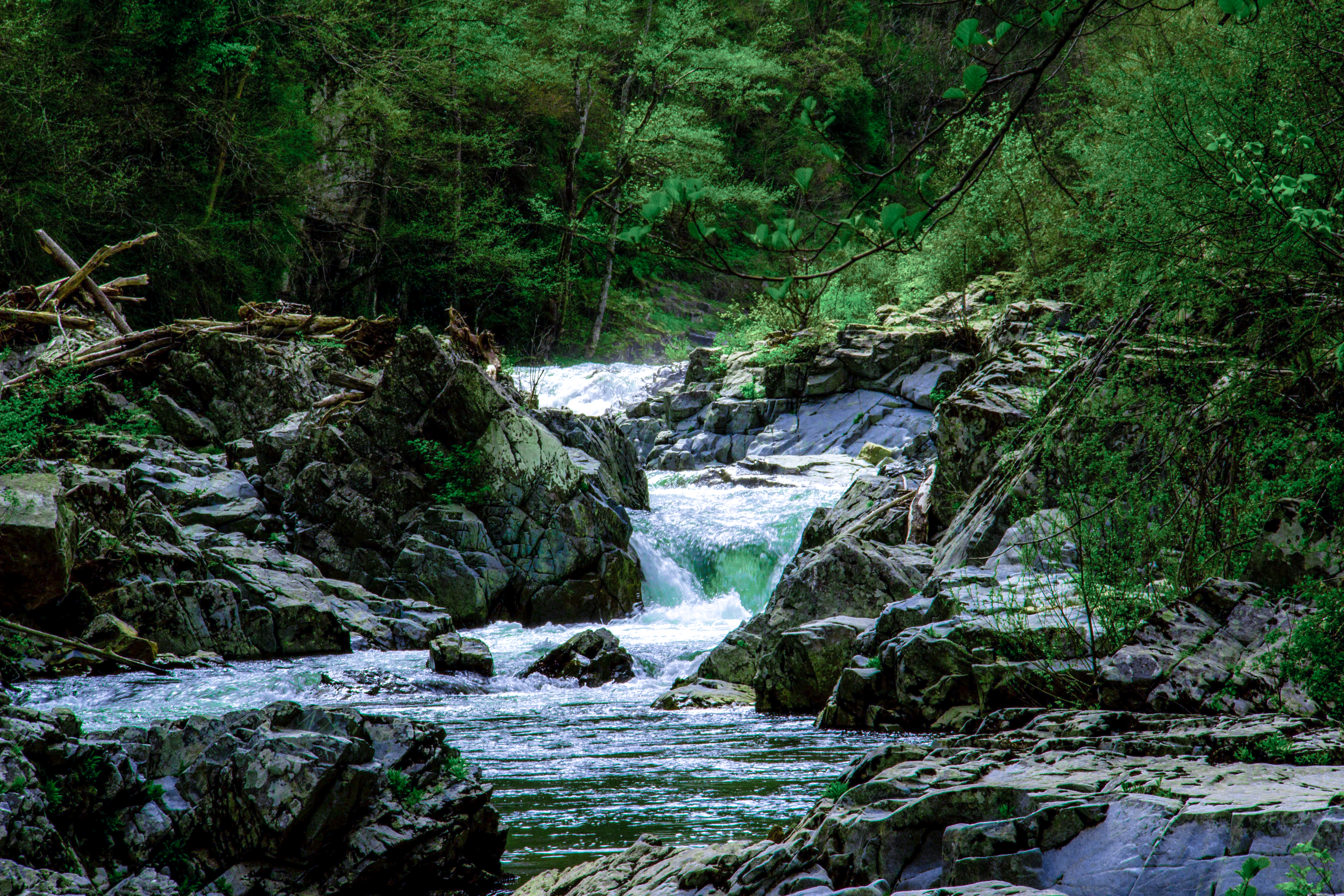
The Rezovo River

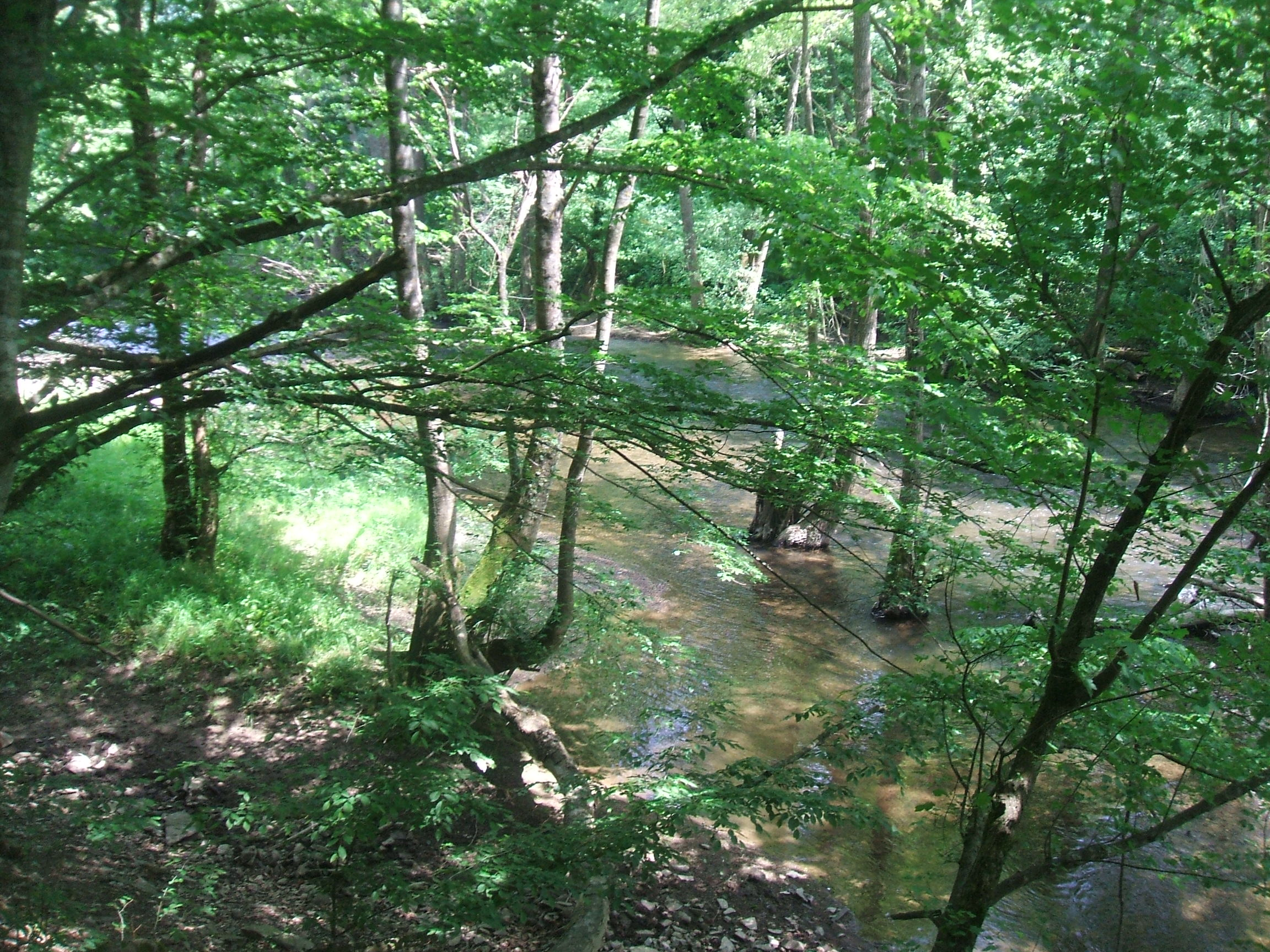
The Rezovo River banks

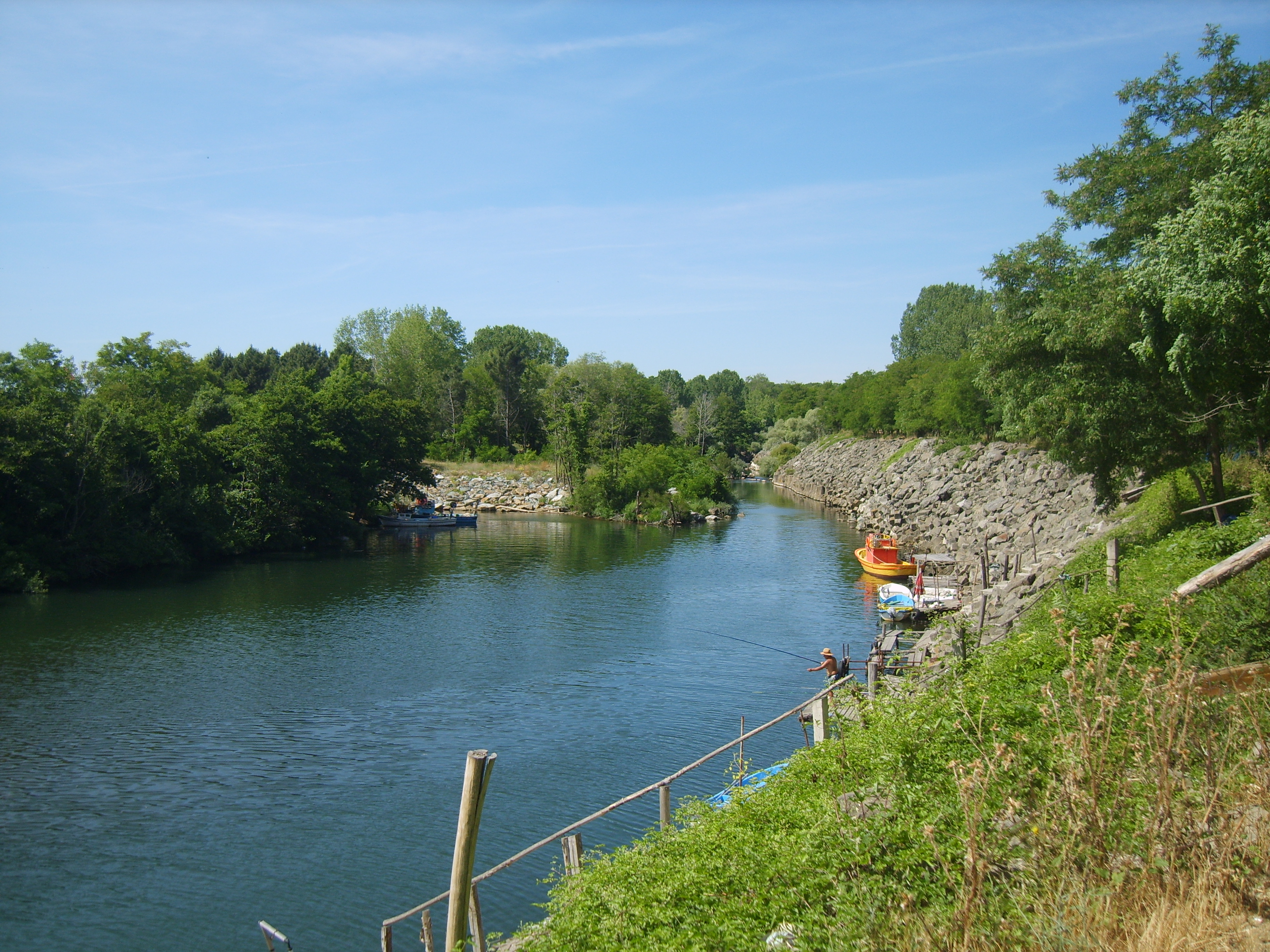
Mouth of the Rezovo

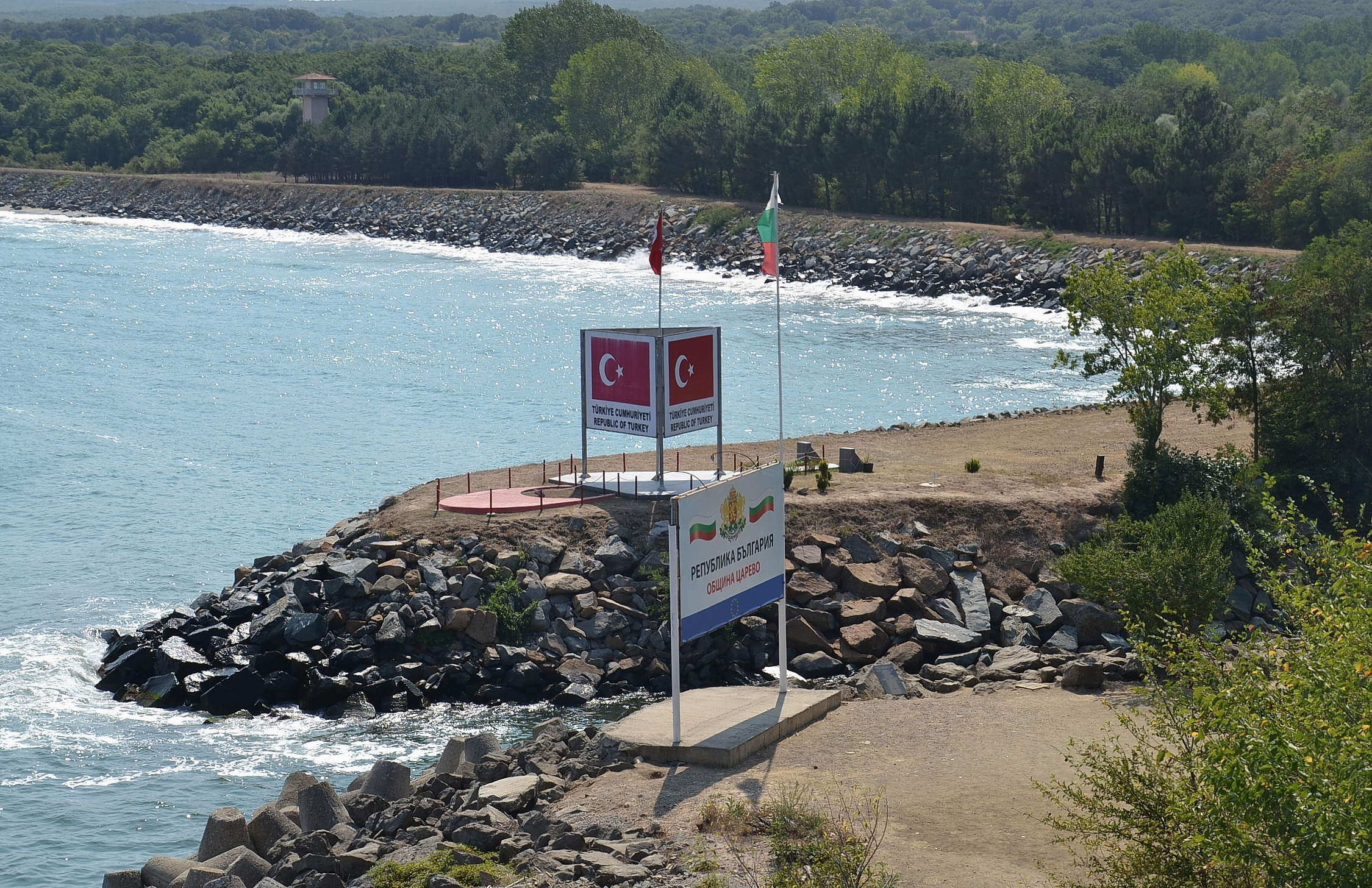
Mouth of the Rezovo
