= Black Sea bleak =

Conservation status
- Endangered (IUCN 3.1)

Scientific classification
- Kingdom: Animalia
- Phylum: Chordata
- Class: Actinopterygii
- Order: Cypriniformes
- Family: Leuciscidae
- Subfamily: Leuciscinae
- Genus: Alburnus
- Species: A. schischkovi

Binomial name
- Alburnus schischkovi (Drensky, 1943)

Synonyms
- Chalcalburnus chalcoides schischkovi Drensky, 1943

Species of fish

The Black Sea bleak (Alburnus schischkovi) is a species of ray-finned fish in the genus Alburnus, that can be found in Bulgaria in river Veleka, and Turkey in river Rezovska. The species is threatened due to the drought in their rivers.
