= Kocēni =

Village in Latvia

Kocēni Kokenhof
- Village
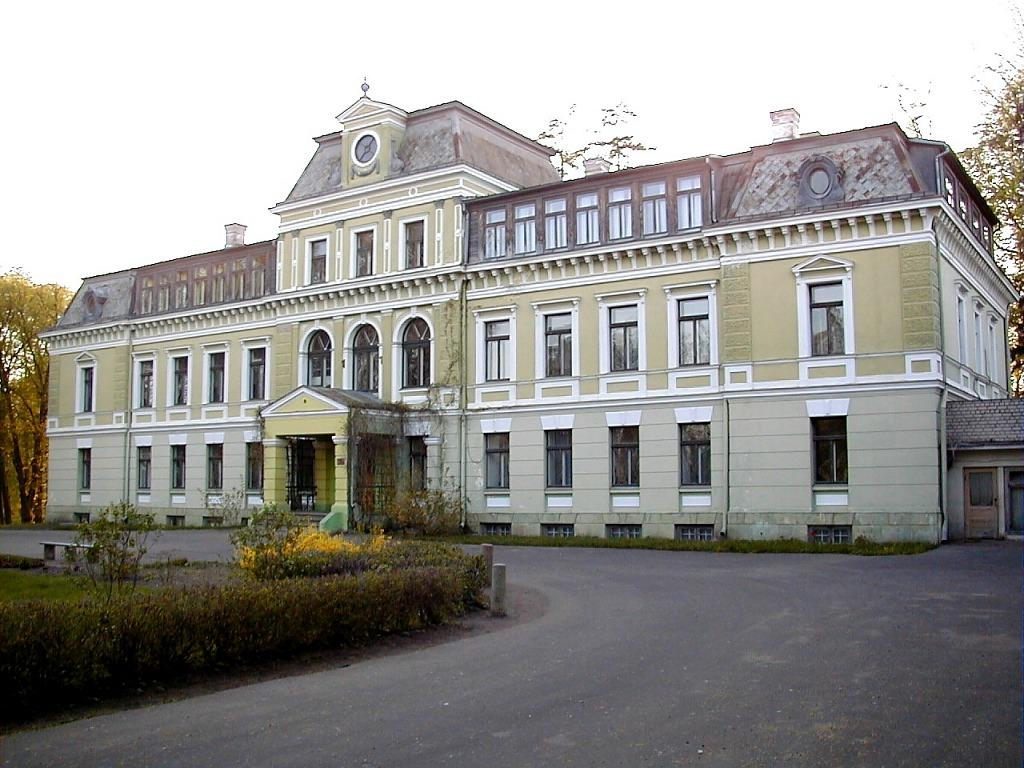
- Kokmuiža Manor in Kocēni

- Kocēni's location in Latvia
- Coordinates: 57°31′11.78″N 25°20′17.65″E
- Country: Latvia
- Municipality: Valmiera
- Parish: Kocēni

Population (2006)
  - Total: 905

Kocēni (German: Kokenhof) is a village in Kocēni Parish, Valmiera Municipality in the Vidzeme region of Latvia.
