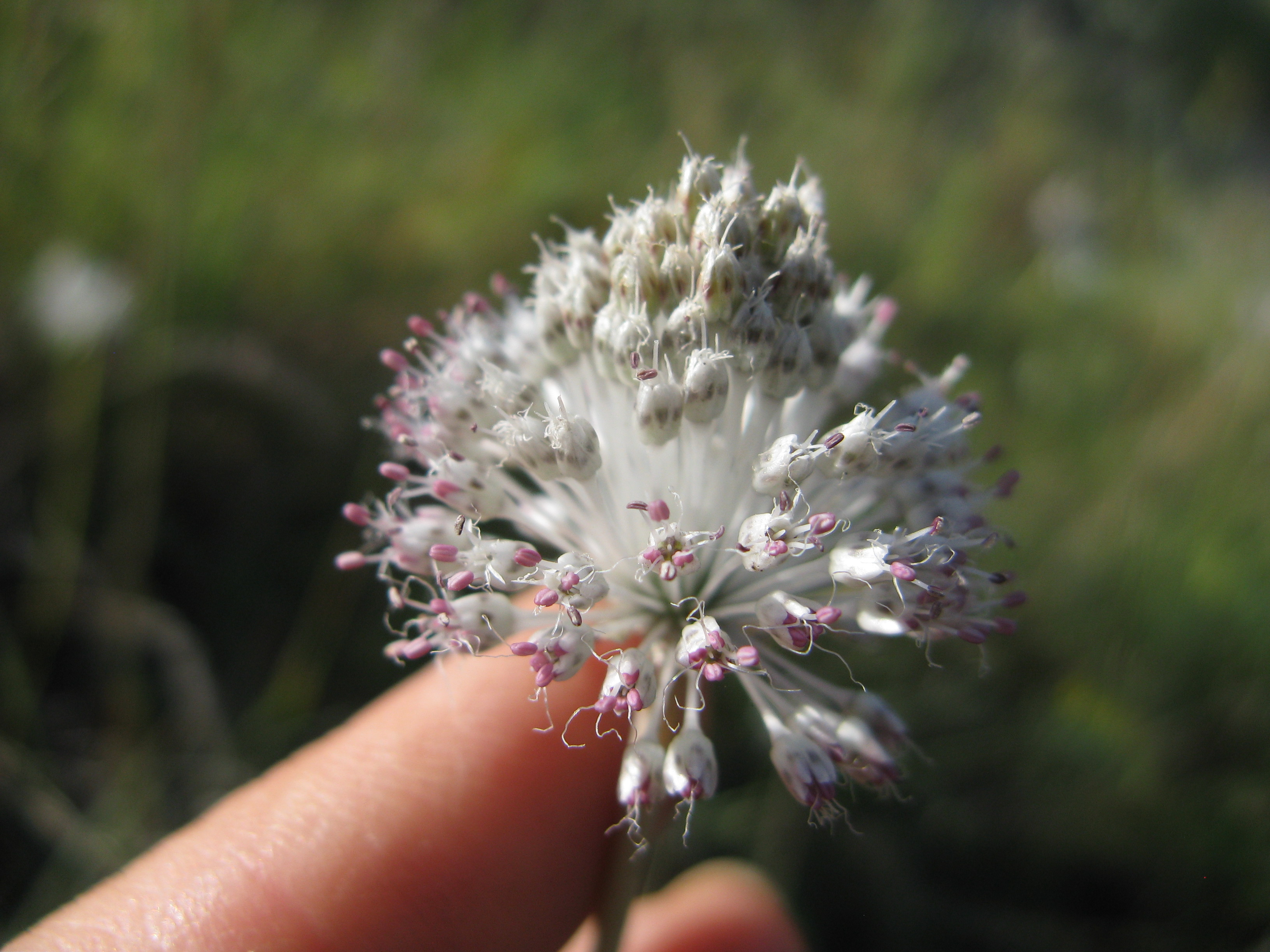
- Allium guttatum tepals have spots

Scientific classification
- Kingdom: Plantae
- Clade: Embryophytes
- Clade: Tracheophytes
- Clade: Spermatophytes
- Clade: Angiosperms
- Clade: Monocots
- Order: Asparagales
- Family: Amaryllidaceae
- Subfamily: Allioideae
- Genus: Allium
- Subgenus: A. subg. Allium
- Species: A. guttatum

Binomial name
- Allium guttatum Steven

= Allium guttatum =

Species of flowering plant

Allium guttatum, spotted garlic, is a species of wild garlic native to Morocco, Algeria, Tunisia, Libya, Portugal, Spain, France, Italy, Sardinia, Sicily, the Balkan Peninsula, the Aegean Islands, Turkey, Cyprus, Romania, and Ukraine (including Crimea). Described in 1809, by 1819 it was being cultivated in British gardens as an ornamental.

== Subspecies ==
The following subspecies are currently accepted:

- Allium guttatum subsp. dalmaticum (A.Kern. ex Janch.) Stearn
- Allium guttatum subsp. guttatum
- Allium guttatum subsp. kartalkayaense Yild.
- Allium guttatum subsp. sardoum (Moris) Stearn
- Allium guttatum subsp. tenorei (Parl.) Soldano
