= Allium pruinatum =

Conservation status
- Data Deficient (IUCN 3.1)

Scientific classification
- Kingdom: Plantae
- Clade: Tracheophytes
- Clade: Angiosperms
- Clade: Monocots
- Order: Asparagales
- Family: Amaryllidaceae
- Subfamily: Allioideae
- Genus: Allium
- Subgenus: A. subg. Allium
- Species: A. pruinatum

Binomial name
- Allium pruinatum Link ex Spreng.

Synonyms
- Species synonymy: Allium monspessulanum subsp. pruinatum (Link ex Spreng.) K.Richt.; Allium pruinatum var. bulbiferum Cout.; Allium pruinatum var. genuinum Cout.; Allium rubrovittatum var. occidentale Rouy ex Willk.; Allium welwitschii Regel

Species of flowering plant

Allium pruinatum is a member of the onion genus Allium native to the Iberian Peninsula.
