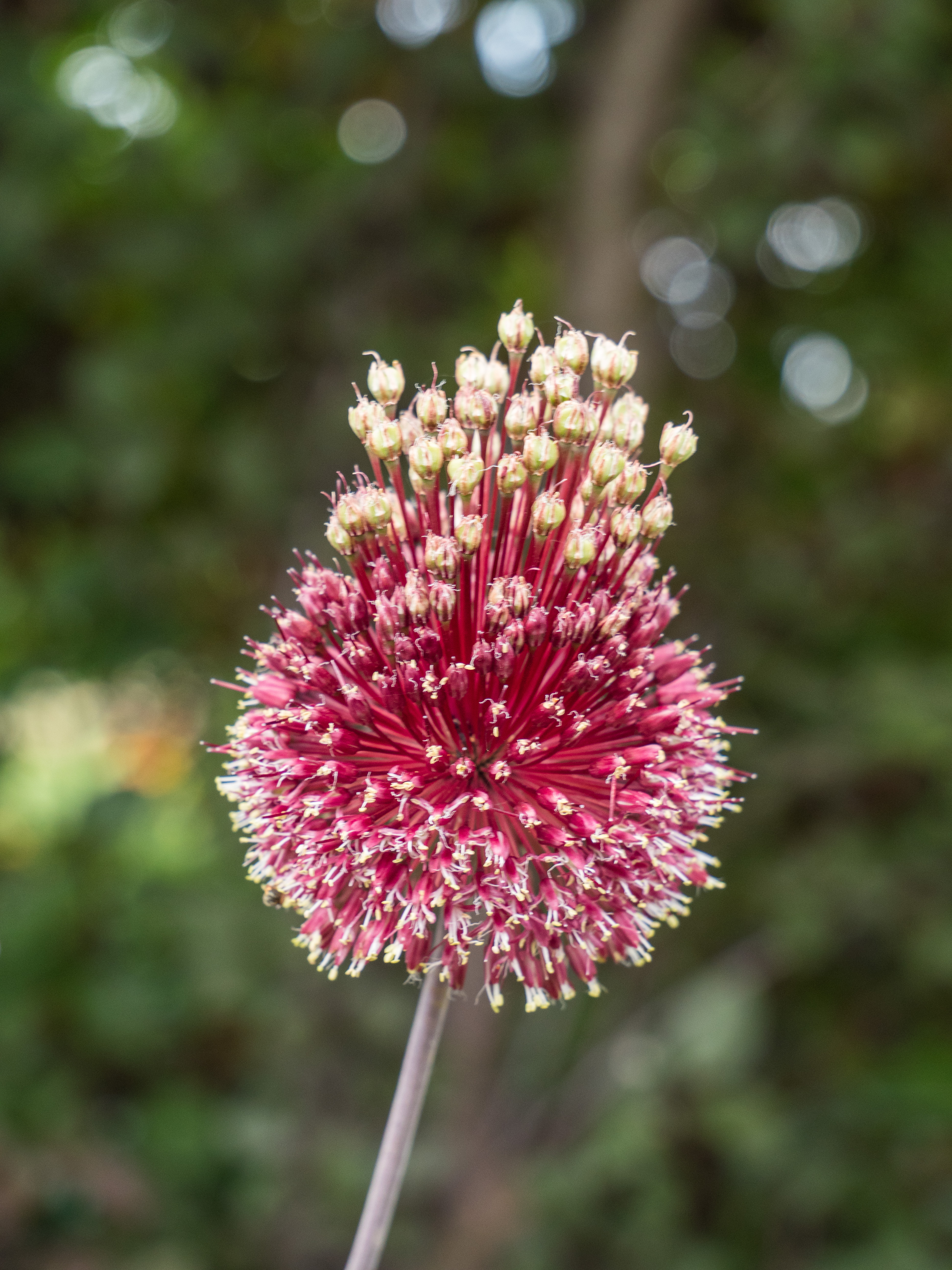
- Allium amethystinum 'Red Mohican'

Scientific classification
- Kingdom: Plantae
- Clade: Tracheophytes
- Clade: Angiosperms
- Clade: Monocots
- Order: Asparagales
- Family: Amaryllidaceae
- Subfamily: Allioideae
- Genus: Allium
- Subgenus: A. subg. Allium
- Species: A. amethystinum

Binomial name
- Allium amethystinum Tausch

Synonyms
- Allium rollii A.Terracc.; Allium segetum Jan ex Schult. & Schult.f.; Allium sphaerocephalon subsp. rollii (A.Terracc.) K.Richt.; Allium stojanovii Kov.

= Allium amethystinum =

Round-headed leek Aglio ametistino

Species of plant

Allium amethystinum is a plant species native to Italy, Greece, Turkey, Sicily, Crete, Malta, Albania, Bulgaria, and the former Yugoslavia, and cultivated elsewhere as an ornamental. It is one of several species that horticulturalists refer to as "drumstick onions" because of the tight spherical "knob" of flowers at the top, resembling a drumstick.

Allium amethystinum has a single bulb. Leaves are tubular, withering before flowering time. Flowers are reddish-purple, the tepals barely opening at flowering time, remaining wrapped around the ovary and filaments so that only the anthers and stigma are exposed.
