= Allium ebusitanum =

Scientific classification
- Kingdom: Plantae
- Clade: Tracheophytes
- Clade: Angiosperms
- Clade: Monocots
- Order: Asparagales
- Family: Amaryllidaceae
- Subfamily: Allioideae
- Genus: Allium
- Subgenus: A. subg. Allium
- Species: A. ebusitanum

Binomial name
- Allium ebusitanum Font Quer

Synonyms
- Allium durandoi (Batt. & Trab.) Seregin; Allium sphaerocephalon var. durandoi Batt. & Trab.; Allium sphaerocephalon subsp. durandoi (Batt. & Trab.) Duyfjes; Allium sphaerocephalon subsp. ebusitanum (Font Quer) Rosselló, Mus & N.Torres

Species of flowering plant

Allium ebusitanum is a plant species known from the Spanish Island of Ibiza in the Balearic Islands, as well as from Tunisia and Algeria.
