= Nikita, Crimea =

Nikita Нікіта
- Urban-type settlement
- Location of Nikita within the Crimea
- Coordinates: 44°30′40″N 34°14′7″E
- Republic: Crimea
- Municipality: Yalta Municipality
- Local council: Massandra
- Elevation: 250 m (820 ft)

Population (2014)
  - Total: 2,257
- Time zone: UTC+4 (MSK)
- Postal code: 98648, 98649
- Area code: +380-654
- Former name: Botanicheskoye (1971—1991)
- Climate: Cfb

Nikita (Ukrainian: Нікіта; Russian: Никита; Crimean Tatar: Nikita) is an urban-type settlement in Yalta Municipality of the Autonomous Republic of Crimea, a territory recognized by a majority of countries as part of Ukraine and incorporated by Russia as the Republic of Crimea. It is known for the Nikitsky Botanical Garden named after the settlement. Population: 2,257 (2014 Census).

Originally it was a village of Nikita owned by a landowner Smirnov, bought by the state in 1811 for the creation of the botanical garden. During the times of the Soviet Union the settlement was renamed into Botanicheskoye ("Botanical" in Russian). The name was restored after the dissolution of the Soviet Union.
