= Kocēni Parish =

Parish of Latvia

- parish of Latvia
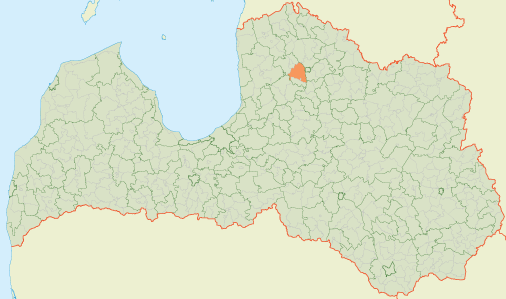
- Coordinates: 57°30′36″N 25°16′41″E
- Country: Latvia

Population (1 January 2026)
  - Total: 2,677

Kocēni Parish (Latvian: Kocēnu pagasts) is an administrative territorial entity of Valmiera Municipality in the Vidzeme region of Latvia. The administrative center is Kocēni.

== Towns, villages and settlements of Kocēni Parish ==
- Brandeļi
- Kocēni
- Rubene
- Tožas

== See also ==
- Henry of Latvia
- Rubene (floorball club)
