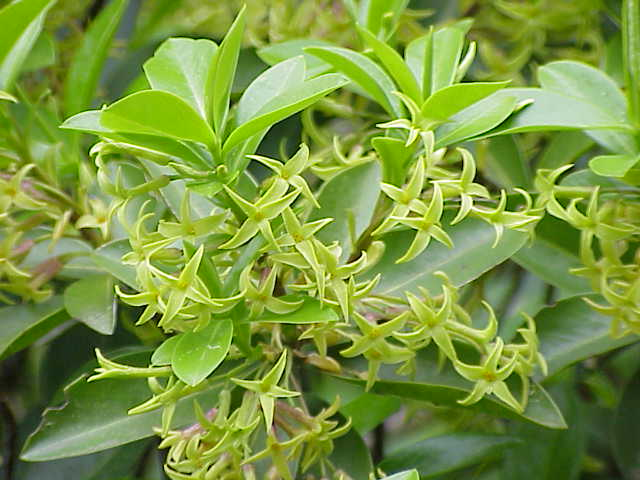

Scientific classification
- Kingdom: Plantae
- Clade: Tracheophytes
- Clade: Angiosperms
- Clade: Eudicots
- Clade: Rosids
- Order: Malvales
- Family: Thymelaeaceae
- Genus: Daphne
- Species: D. pontica

Binomial name
- Daphne pontica L.

= Daphne pontica =

Species of shrub

Daphne pontica, commonly known as twin-flowered or Pontic daphne, is a species of flowering plant in the family Thymelaeaceae, native to Bulgaria, northern Turkey and the Caucasus. It is a small evergreen shrub growing to 1 m (3 ft 3 in) tall by 1.5 m (4 ft 11 in) wide, with leathery leaves and clusters of fragrant yellow flowers in pairs, in spring. The flowers are often followed by black berries. It tolerates deep shade in the garden, but dislikes transplanting.

This plant has gained the Royal Horticultural Society's Award of Garden Merit.

The specific epithet pontica, refers to the Latin term for Pontus, a city of the Black Sea.
