= Veselie (village) =

Veselie Веселие
- Village
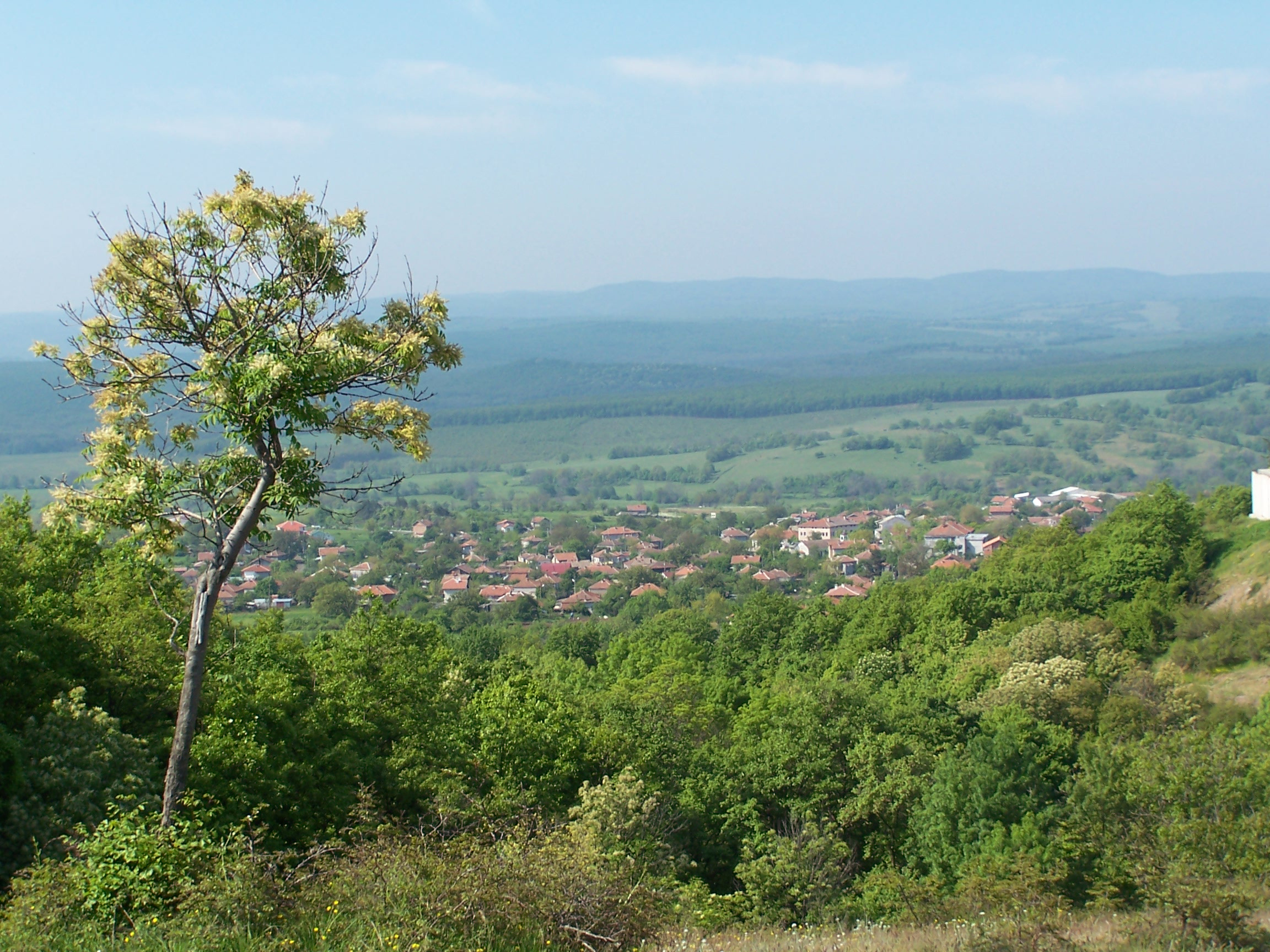

- Location within Bulgaria
- Coordinates: 42°20′N 27°38′E
- Country: Bulgaria
- Province: Burgas Province
- Municipality: Primorsko

Area
  - Total: 61.054 km^{2} (23.573 sq mi)
- Elevation: 117 m (384 ft)

Population (2013)
  - Total: 539
- Time zone: UTC+2 (EET)
  - Summer (DST): UTC+3 (EEST)
- Postal code: 8145

Veselie (Bulgarian: Веселие) is a village in Primorsko Municipality, Burgas Province, in southeastern Bulgaria. As of 2013 it has 539 inhabitants.

== Geography ==
The village is situated in a valley near the Ropotamo River at the western foothills of Medni Rid Ridge, which is the north-eastern extreme of the Bosna Ridge in the Strandzha Mountains. It is located at about 30 km south of Burgas and 14 km from the municipal centre Primorsko on the Bulgarian Black Sea coast.

== History ==
The village was established in 1731 during the Ottoman rule of Bulgaria. It was originally named Saramusa. In 1861 a group of Circassians, expelled from the Caucasus, was settled near the village and established a settlement named Chenger. However, all attempts of the Ottoman authorities to convert them to farmers failed and Circassians indulged in looting, stealing cattle, rape and murder. During the Russo-Turkish War of 1877–1878, the Circassians from Chenger formed bandit gangs and terrorised the local population. Some of them were mobilized in the army of Mehmed Ali Pasha that fought in north-eastern Bulgaria. After the general retreat of the Ottoman army in the winter of 1878 the Circassians from Chenger left the village and settled in Turkey.

== Religion ==
The population of the village is Christian. There is a church named after Saint Elijah and a chapel.

== Regular events ==
The village feast is celebrated the first Sunday of August or the last Sunday of July.

== People from Veselie ==
- Bozhidar Dimitrov, historian

== Honour ==
Veselie Glacier in Antarctica is named after the village.
