= Rosen, Burgas Province =

Rosen Росен
- Village
- Location within Bulgaria
- Coordinates: 42°23′N 27°34′E
- Country: Bulgaria
- Province: Burgas Province
- Municipality: Sozopol

Area
  - Total: 38.386 km^{2} (14.821 sq mi)
- Elevation: 87 m (285 ft)

Population (2013)
  - Total: 1,470
- Time zone: UTC+2 (EET)
  - Summer (DST): UTC+3 (EEST)
- Postal code: 8150

Rosen (Bulgarian: Росен) is a village in Sozopol Municipality, in Burgas Province, in south-eastern Bulgaria. As of 2013 it has 1470 inhabitants.

The village is situated at the river Rosenska, a tributary to the Ropotamo, at the western foothills of Medni Rid Ridge, which is the north-eastern extreme of the Bosna Ridge in the Strandzha Mountains. It is located at about 22 km south of Burgas and 19 km of the municipal centre Sozopol on the Bulgarian Black Sea coast.

The vestiges of the medieval fortress of Krimna are situated at Bakarlaka peak in Medni Rid. In 1328 the Bulgarian emperor Michael Shishman and the Byzantine emperor Andronikos III Palaiologos signed an alliance treaty there. The first school in what is now Sozopol Municipality was established in Rosen in 1830. The Church of Saint George was constructed in 1882.
