= Ravadinovo =

Ravadinovo Равадиново
- Village
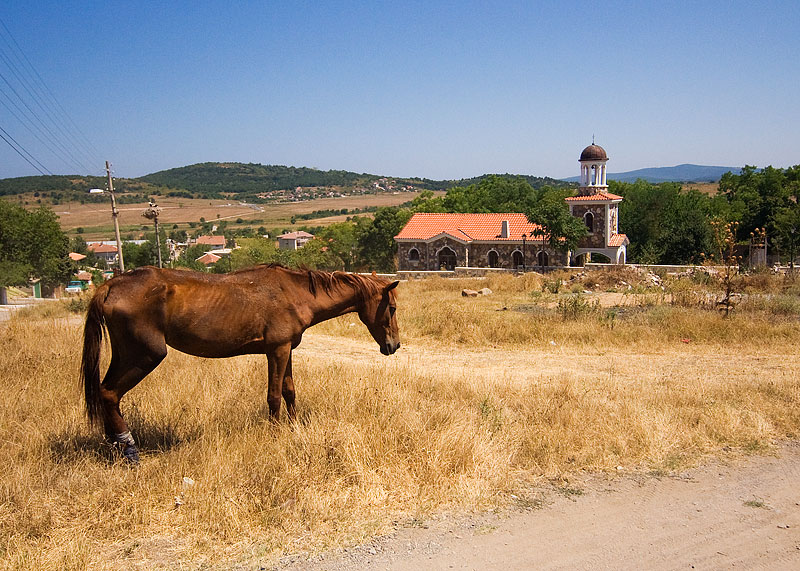

- Location within Bulgaria
- Coordinates: 42°23′N 27°40′E
- Country: Bulgaria
- Province: Burgas Province
- Municipality: Sozopol

Area
  - Total: 27.25 km^{2} (10.52 sq mi)
- Elevation: 87 m (285 ft)

Population (2013)
  - Total: 691
- Time zone: UTC+2 (EET)
  - Summer (DST): UTC+3 (EEST)
- Postal code: 8131

Ravadinovo (Bulgarian: Равадиново) is a village in Sozopol Municipality, in Burgas Province, in southeastern Bulgaria. As of 2013 it has 691 inhabitants.

The village is situated at a distance of 2.5 km from the Black Sea, at the north-eastern foothills of Medni Rid Ridge, which is itself the north-eastern extreme of the Bosna Ridge in the Strandzha Mountains. Ravadinovo is located at some 6 km of the municipal centre Sozopol on the Bulgarian Black Sea coast. The village was established in 1913 by Bulgarian refugees from Eastern and Western Thrace.
