= Roussalka =

Roussalka may refer to

- Rusalka, Bulgaria, also called Roussalka
- MY Roussalka, a luxury yacht in operation from 1931 to 1933
- Roussalka (horse), a British Thoroughbred racehorse

== See also ==
- Rusalka (disambiguation)
