= Stomoplo =

Bay in Burgas Province, Bulgaria

- Location in Bulgaria
- Location: Bulgarian Black Sea Coast
- Coordinates: 42.27997°N 27.753264°E
- Basin countries: Bulgaria
- Max. depth: 22 metres (72 ft)
- Settlements: Primorsko

Stomoplo or Stamopolu, also known as "The Crocodile Island", is a bay on which the town of Primorsko is situated, on the southern coast of the Thracian Black Sea, in the Burgas Province of Bulgaria.

It is a destination for divers and spearfishermen. The maximum depth is 22 metres (72 ft). The lagoon is rich in fish and has a varied flora and fauna.
