= Kiten, Burgas Province =

Kiten
- Location of Kiten, Burgas Province
- Coordinates: 42°14′05″N 27°46′27″E
- Country: Bulgaria
- Province (Oblast): Burgas

Government
  - Mayor: Nikolay Markov

Area
  - Total: 17.003 km^{2} (6.565 sq mi)
- Elevation: 15 m (49 ft)

Population (13.09.2005)
  - Total: 1,131
  - Density: 66.52/km^{2} (172.3/sq mi)
- Time zone: UTC+2 (EET)
  - Summer (DST): UTC+3 (EEST)
- Postal Code: 8183
- IDD : area code: +359 (0)550
- Climate type: Cfa humid subtropical climate

Kiten (Bulgarian: Китен [ˈkitɛn]) is a seaside resort town on the Bulgarian Black Sea Coast, part of Burgas Province. It is situated on the small Urdoviza peninsula, near the mouth of the Kiten River, and has two beaches: Atliman and Urdoviza.

Until the Balkan Wars in 1912–1913, there was only an unmanned pier used to export wood and charcoal on the site. Kiten was founded in 1931 by 30 families of Bulgarian refugees from Eastern Thrace who resettled there from the newly founded refugee village of Fazanovo. However, the area has roots from antiquity, as amphoras from the 6th century BCE were found on the south beach (Urdoviza). Kiten was declared a national resort in 1962, and since 1981 it had been administratively a quarter of nearby Primorsko. On 17 June 2005, the former village was proclaimed a separate town in order to more effectively cope with the growing number of tourists, primarily from Bulgaria, Romania, Czech Republic, Slovakia, Poland, Serbia, Russia and Germany.

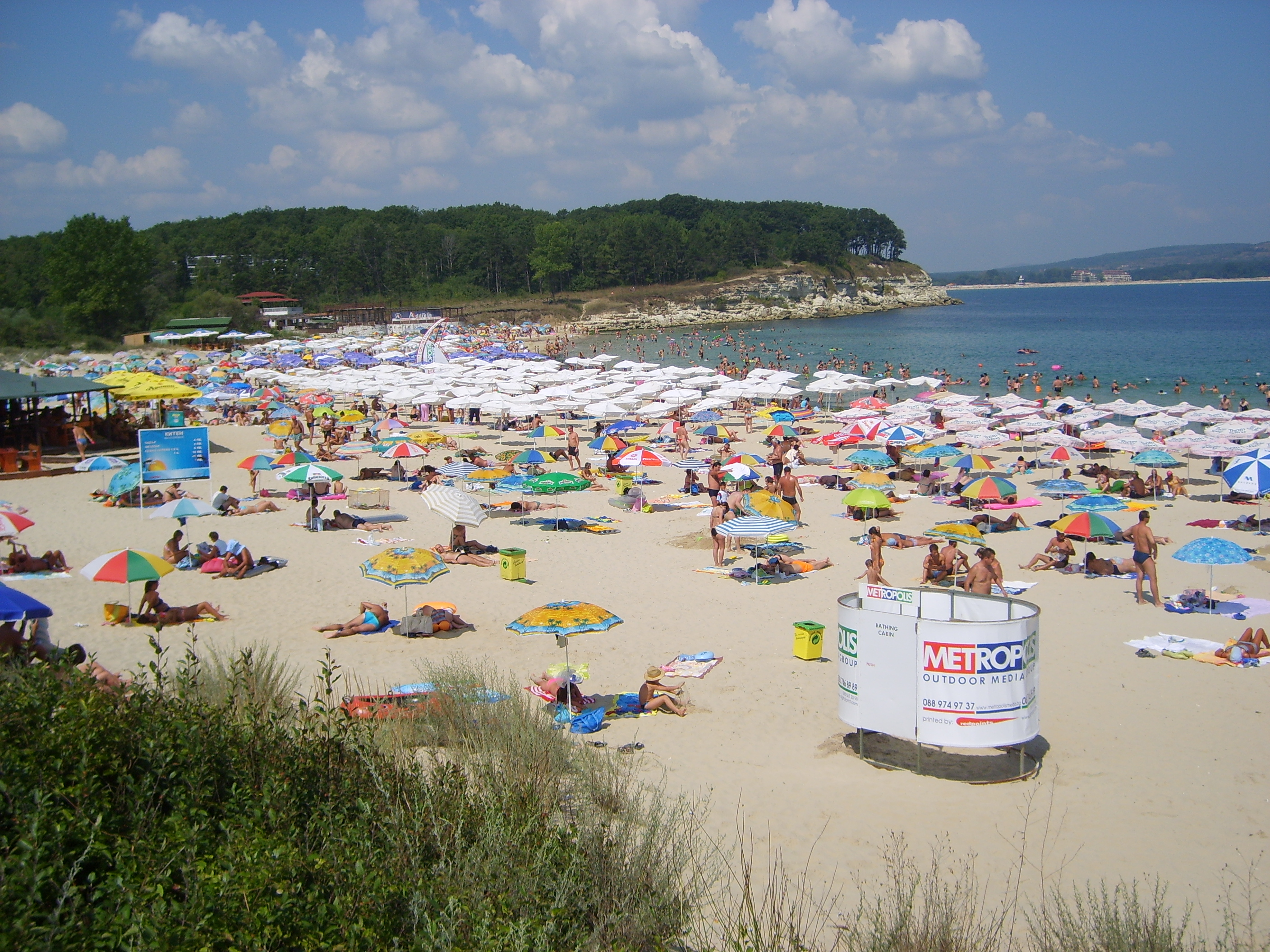
Atliman beach

== Geography ==
The town of Kiten is located in the southeastern part of the Republic of Bulgaria, on the Black Sea coast, 53 km southeast of the regional center of Bourgas, 6 km south of the municipal center of Primorsko and 12 km northwest of the center of the neighboring municipality of Tsarevo. It is located north of the mouth of the Kitenska River, and part of it - on the small peninsula Urdoviza.

The main features of the relief in Kiten, which drive tourism, are the beaches and the two bays - Karaagach and Konnik, better known as Atliman. There are other small bays along the Strandzha coast (Sozopol, Kavatsite, Stomoplo). The combination of the forested branches of Strandzha and the sea makes these beaches a tourist destination.

The beaches are perhaps the main natural resource that determines the development of Kiten as a resort and as a center for summer sea recreation. The town of Kiten has two sandy beaches with a total area of about 145,000 m2. The northern beach or "Kiten-Atliman" is located at the bottom of the bay of the same name. It has an area of about 81,000 m2, which includes beautiful sand dunes. On both sides the beach is surrounded by a high rocky shore. The southern beach is conditionally divided into two - "Kiten-South" beach and "Camping Kiten" beach. It is located on the Gulf of Urdoviza, which is more open to the sea. The length of its coastline is 1380 m. To the south it reaches the mouth of the Karaagach River, and to the north to the beginning of the rocky Urdoviza peninsula, where the port quay is now built. Near Kiten are the beaches of MMC - "Primorsko" and "Primorsko-South", which are among the largest beaches on the Black Sea coast south of Bourgas.

Kiten has a mild, sunny, warm and humid transitional Mediterranean climate. The average annual temperature is 12 °C and the average January temperature does not fall below 2 °C. In Kiten there are no frosts typical for the interior of Strandzha in winter. The average daily temperature in summer is 27 °C, and it is warm with about 1700 hours of sunshine from May to October. The prevailing winds are northwest, as well as breeze circulation during the warm half of the year. The good climatic conditions, combined with the peculiarities of the relief - the closed bays, suggest a calm sea during most of the summer season. Unfavorable are the strong rain and thunderstorms at the end of the summer season, usually in late August and September. The resort is located on the Black Sea coast, which is in itself a closed sea - its only connection to the World Ocean is the Bosphorus Strait, which connects it to the Sea of Marmara. This determines its low salinity, which is due to the large European rivers Danube, Dnieper, Dniester and Don flowing into it. The 18 per mille salinity distinguishes the Black Sea from all other seas, as well as the weak tides and the lack of dangerous marine life. These conditions provide excellent prerequisites for the development of summer sea tourism on the shores of this water basin, as well as other recreational activities such as water sports, fishing, etc.

Kiten is located on a small peninsula between the two small Black Sea bays Karaagach and Konnik (the latter is the southernmost part of the Devil's Bay). The rivers Karaagach, or also called Kitenska river, and Dyavolska river flow into them, respectively. In both rivers there are river and swamp mullet, black barbel, white fish. There is also a mineral spring in the resort, which is located near the Atliman campsite. The water comes from a depth of about 700 m. It is canalized and has an established chemical composition (nitrates, chlorides - 277 mg / dm3). The water of this spring is used mainly for drinking.

The main plant species that create the appearance and among which is located a large part of the resort are the various species of oak, such as hornbeam, sessile oak, cer, and artificial plantations of white and black pine. Dogwood is also found, and mainly around Karaagach Bay there is significant poplar afforestation. The mouth of the Kitenska River is overgrown with swamp reeds, willow, and along the steep cliff to the South Beach there is a wild vine. From the Strandzha vegetation there are certain species of plants, the growth of which is determined by the climatic influences of the sea tropics, such as the bushy subtropical plant Filirea media, called "parnar", the beautiful evergreen plant Rhododendron ponticum, known as Strandzha periwinkle and others.

== Honour ==
Kiten Point on Graham Land in Antarctica is named after the town.
