= Medni Rid =

Medni Rid/Bakarlak
- Bulgarian: Медни рид/Бакърлък
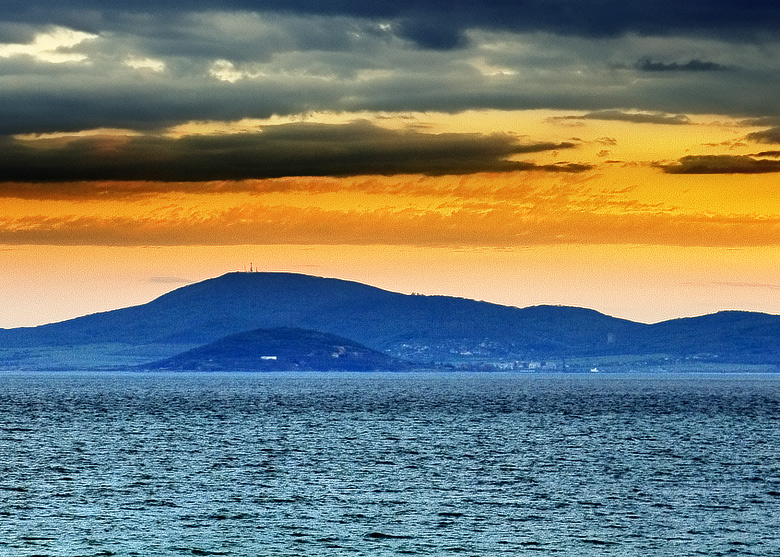
- Medni Rid seen from the Black Sea

Highest point
- Peak: Bakarlaka
- Elevation: 376 m (1,234 ft)
- Coordinates: 42°23′51″N 27°36′28″E

Dimensions
- Length: 20 km (12 mi) northwest-southeast
- Width: 5 km (3.1 mi) northeast-southwest

Geography
- Location within Bulgaria
- Country: Bulgaria

Geology
- Rock type(s): andesite, tuffite

Medni Rid (Bulgarian: Медни рид, meaning Copper Ridge), also known as Bakarlak (Бакърлък) until 1942, is a ridge in south-eastern Bulgaria. It forms the north-eastern extreme of the Bosna Ridge in the Strandzha Mountains. Administratively, it lies in the municipalities of Sozopol and Primorsko, Burgas Province.

The main orographic ridge extends from the north-west to the south-east with a maximum length of 18–20 km and width of 3–5 km. The north-western extreme of Medni Rid reaches Cape Chukalya on the southern coast of the Gulf of Burgas; to the south-east it reaches the valley of the river Ropotamo, which separates it from the isolated ridge of Kitka Ridge. To the west, the valleys of the rivers Rosenska (a left tributary of the Ropotamo) and Otmanliy (flowing directly into the Gulf of Bourgas) separate it from the small ridge Rosen Bair. The two ridges are connected via a low saddle near the village of Rosen. To the east, Medni Rid descends to the shores of the Black Sea.

Its highest point, Mount Bakarlaka (376.2 m), rises in the northern section. Medni Rid is composed by andesite, tuff and plutonic rocks. In its northern part there are copper ore deposits. The climate is continental with significant Black Sea influence. The ridge is drained by small rivers and streams. The predominant soils are cinnamon forest ones. The ridge and its slopes are overgrown with oak, hornbeam and lime forests.

On its eastern and western foothills there are four villages: Atia and Ravadinovo to the east, Rosen and Veselie to the west.

The south-eastern part of Medni Rid falls within the territory of the Ropotamo Nature Reserve; its northern part is occupied by the Rosenets recreational forest. A 7.21-hectare (17.8-acre) section of the ridge is designated as a protected area named Bakarlaka. About 172 bird species have been discovered in Medni Rid and the ridge has been declared a site of ornithologic importance. It is an important stop for migrating storks and pelicans after they cross the Gulf of Burgas from Cape Emine in the easternmost Balkan Mountains. Medni Rid is among the nation's foremost nesting sites for middle spotted woodpecker, olive-tree warbler, spotted crake and yelkouan shearwater. There are significant populations of barred warbler and ortolan bunting.

On all high points of the ridge — from north to south Atia, Bakarlaka, Lobodovo Kale, Malkoto Kale — there are remnants of Thracian fortresses, built of crushed stone. Methodical excavations were conducted only at Malkoto Kale between 1973 and 1977. Copper, as well as some quantities of silver, had been mined since the second millennium BC. The last copper mine "Rosen" was closed down in 1995.
