= Bozhurets =

Village in Kavarna municipality, Dobrich oblast, Bulgaria

Coordinates: 43°25′25.8″N 28°17′32.9″E

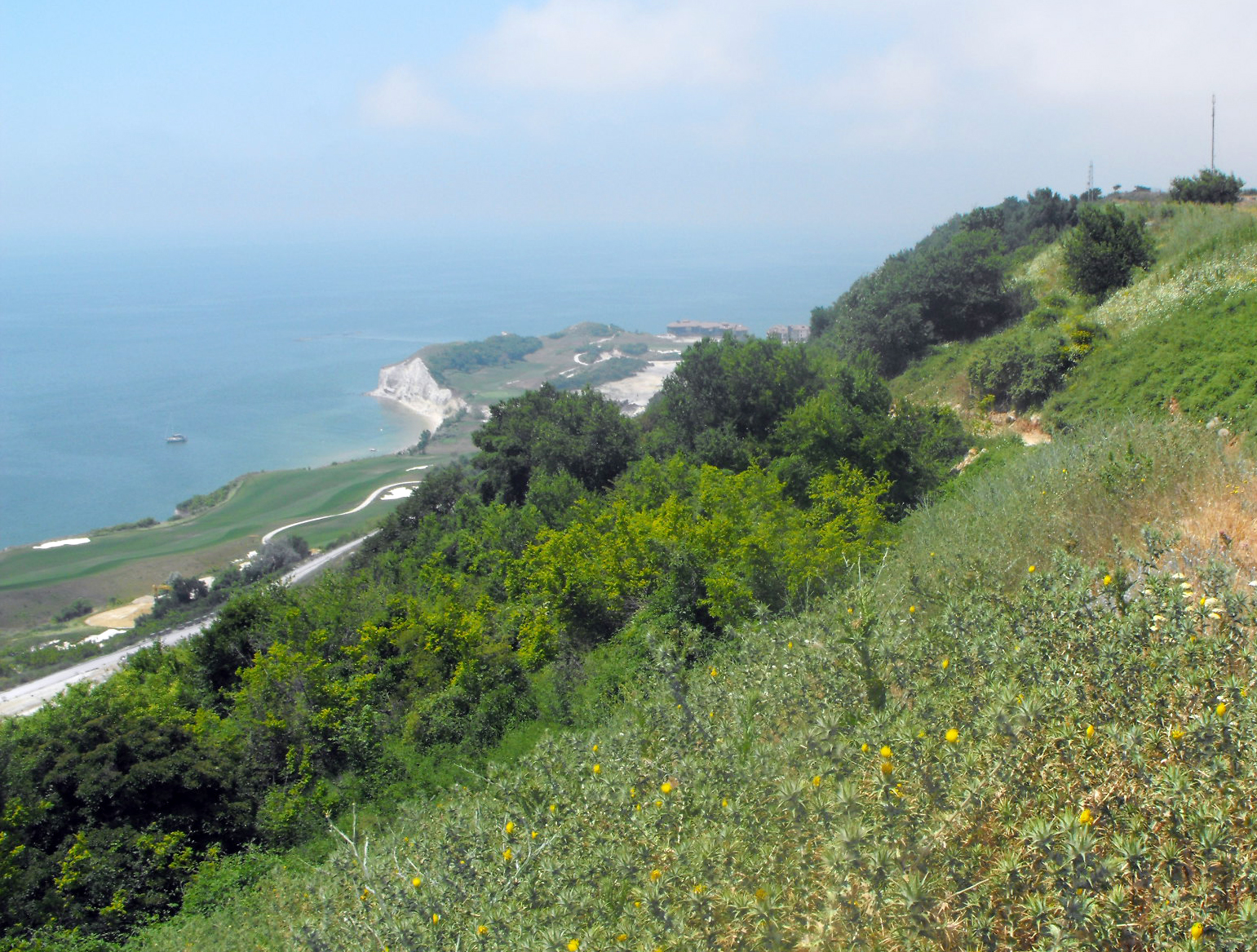
Bozhurets

Bozhurets (Bulgarian: Божурец) is a coastal village and seaside resort on the north Bulgarian Black Sea Coast, part of Dobrich Province.

It is located between the sea towns Balchik and Kavarna, with a distance of 56 km (35 mi) to Varna International Airport.

== Resort ==
The flat landscape ends with a dramatic cliff with a prominent sea view. The seashore is quite rocky, but there are several large coves with sandy beaches. The nearest town Kavarna is a quickly developing tourist centre, but the prices are still cheaper than other places on the Bulgarian Seaside.

The distance from the village to the Gary Player PGA Championship Golf Course is only 2 km which is one of the biggest projects on the Black Sea Coast called "Thracian Cliffs". It will include a four star hotel, villa complex, luxury apartments and a marina. A second Gary Player Golf Resort is being built just 3 km away, while 8 km away, a third golf course designed by Ian Woosnam is also under construction.
