= Primorsko Airfield =

- IATA: none; ICAO: LBPR

Summary
- Airport type: Public
- Owner: Intersky
- Location: Primorsko, Bulgaria
- Elevation AMSL: 14 ft / 4 m
- Coordinates: 42°15′58″N 027°42′22″E
- Interactive map of Primorsko Airfield

Runways
Direction	Length		Surface
Direction	m	ft	Surface
10/28	910	2,986	Asphalt
- Source: Bulgarian CAA

Primorsko Airfield (ICAO: LBPR) is an airfield in Primorsko, Bulgaria. The airfield was built in 2003. It is located 5 km west of Primorsko near the village of Yasna polyana.
