= Rusalka (disambiguation) =

Rusalka is a water-nymph in Slavic mythology.

Rusalka may also refer to:

== Places ==
- Rusałka, Szczecin, a lake in Szczecin, Poland
- Lake Rusałka, Poznań, a lake in Poznań, Poland
- Rusalka, Bulgaria, a resort on the Bulgarian Black Sea Coast
- Rusalka Planitia, a surface feature of the planet Venus

== Art and culture ==
- Rusalka (opera), an opera by Antonín Dvořák
- Rusalka (play), a major though unfinished verse play by Alexander Pushkin
- La Roussalka, a play by Édouard Schuré with incidental music by Camille Chevillard
- Rusalka (Dargomyzhsky), an opera by Alexander Dargomyzhsky based on Pushkin's play
- Rusalka (novel), a fantasy novel by C. J. Cherryh
- Mermaid (2007 film) (Russian: Rusalka), a Russian film by Anna Melikian
- Rusalka (1996 film), a 1996 Russian animated short film
- "Rusalka", a song by Radarmaker

== Others ==
- Russian monitor Rusalka, a Russian ironclad which sank near Helsinki, Finland on September 7, 1893
- Russalka Memorial in Tallinn, by Amandus Adamson
