= Ropotamo =

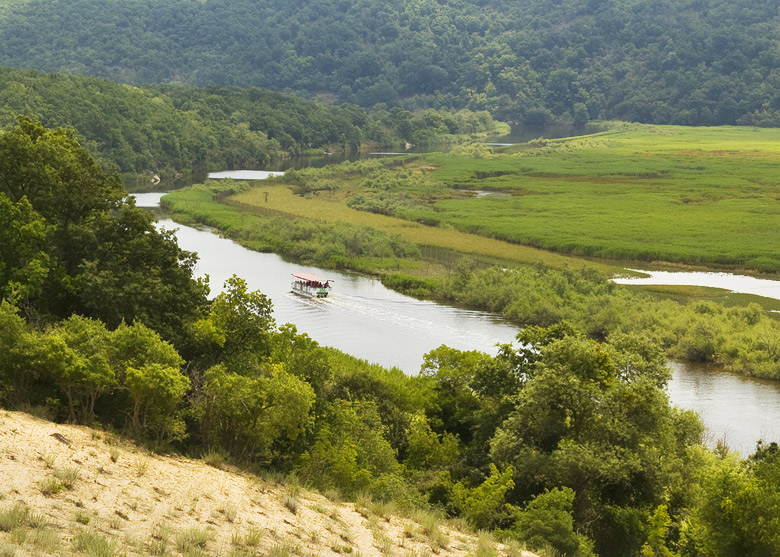

Location
- Country: Bulgaria

Physical characteristics
- Source
  - location: Bosna Ridge, Strandzha
  - elevation: 400 m (1,300 ft)
- Mouth
  - location: Black Sea
  - coordinates: 42°19′40.08″N 27°45′20.16″E
  - elevation: 0 m (0 ft)
- Length: 48 km (30 mi)
- Basin size: 249 km^{2} (96 sq mi)

The Ropotamo (Bulgarian: Ропотамо [ropoˈtamo], from the Ancient Greek word Ροπόταμος ropotamos meaning "border river") is a river in south-eastern Bulgaria. It takes its source from the Bosna Ridge in the Strandzha Mountains, running for 48.5 km to empty into the Black Sea near Cape Saint Demetrius between Dyuni and Primorsko.

The river is most often noted for its 30 m-wide mouth that is home to an abundance of flora species, over 100 of which endangered in the country. The lower section of the river is a protected area since 1940 and forms part of the Ropotamo Reserve. The lower Ropotamo is a popular tourist attraction because of the water lilies and the rock formations above the river, on some of which white-tailed eagles nest.

Ropotamo Glacier on Livingston Island in the South Shetland Islands, Antarctica is named after Ropotamo River.

== Geography ==
Under the name Tserovska River, the Ropotamo originates from the Bosna Ridge in the Strandzha Mountains at some 500 m south-west of the Bosna Peak (454 m) at an altitude of 400 m. Up until the village of Novo Panicharevo it flows in north-eastern direction in a deep and narrow forested valley. Further downstream from the village it leaves the mountains and turns eastwards in a wide valley. The Ropotamo then forms a narrow gorge between the ridges Medni Rid and Uzun Bair and enters a wide marshy valley near its mouth. It empties into the Black Sea in a small homonymous bay to the west of Cape Saint Demetrius. Near its mouth there is a long and wide liman separated from the sea by sandspits, which is navigable for small vessels.

Ropotamo's drainage basin spans a territory of 249 km^{2}. It borders the basins of the rivers Izvorska that empties into Lake Mandrensko to the north-west, Veleka to the south-west and Dyavolska reka to the south and south-east. The river has predominantly rain feed with high water in winter (January–February) and low water in autumn (August). The average annual flow is 1.31 m3/s at the village of Veselie.

== Ecology ==
Ropotamo Complex
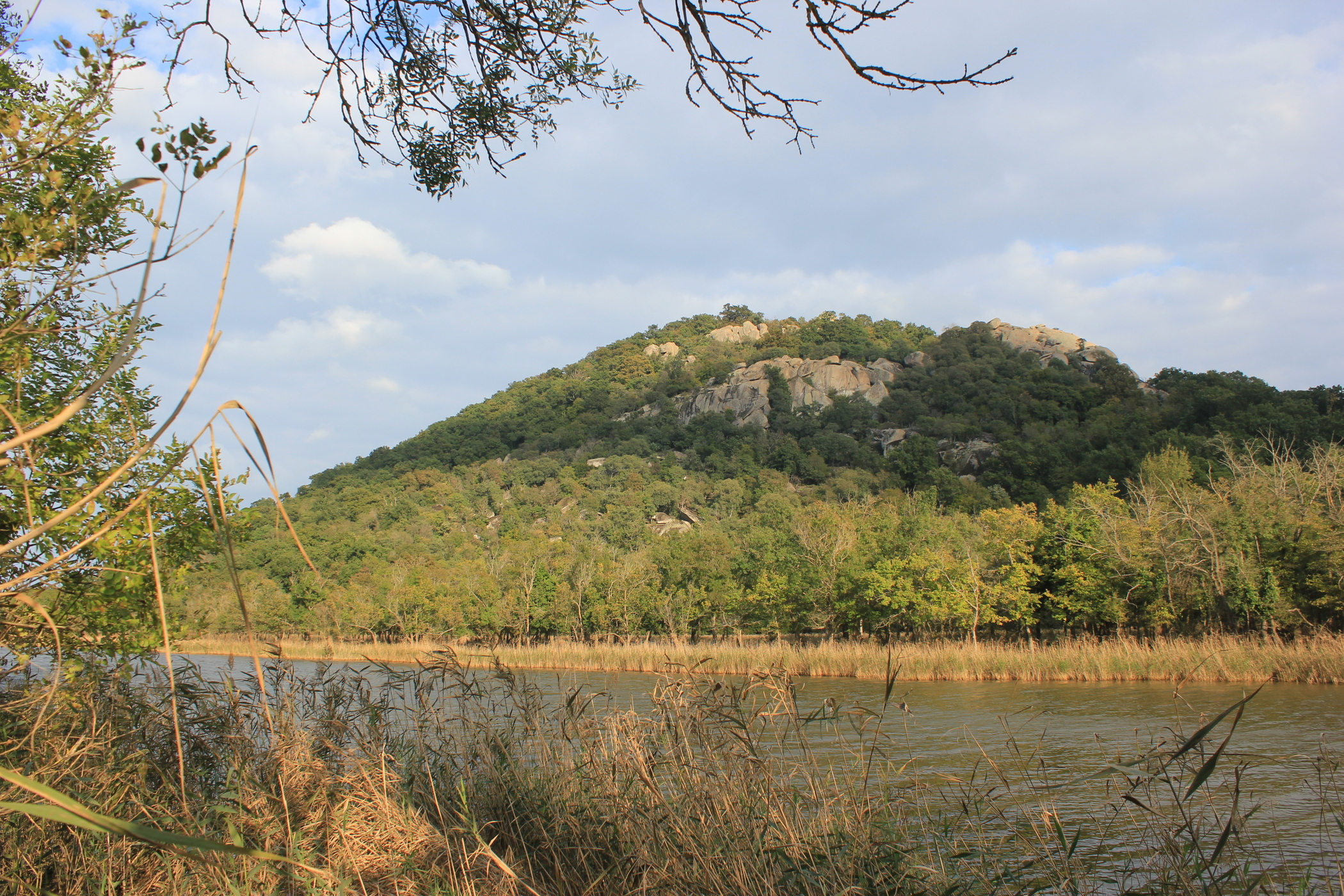
- Ropotamo River near its mouth into the Black sea
- Interactive map of Ropotamo Complex
- Location: southeastern Bulgaria
- Area: 5,500 ha (21 sq mi)

Ramsar Wetland
- Official name: Ropotamo Complex
- Designated: 24 September 1975
- Reference no.: 65

Most of the river valley is covered in dense riparian forests of oak, ash, elm, hornbeam, etc. The lower course hosts abundant populations of European white water lily (Nymphaea alba) and a number of rare plant and animal species. To protect these ecosystems in 1940 the authorities established the Ropotamo Reserve, which was designated a Ramsar site in 1975 as part of the Ropotamo Complex that also includes the swamps Alepu, Arkutino and several smaller protected areas. In the lower course there are rock formations, such as the Lion's Head, small caves, and the highest dune in the Balkans.

The most important mammal species are red deer, fallow deer, roe deer, wild boar, grey wolf, red fox and golden jackal. The largest birds of prey are the white-tailed eagles with a wing-span of over two meters, and the Eurasian eagle-owl. The river is located on the Via Pontica bird migratory route. There are about 50 fish species, such as flathead grey mullet, big-scale sand smelt, European eel, round goby, Caucasian dwarf goby, as well as abundant populations of European pond turtle.
