= Elenite =

Elenite Елените
- Resort complex
- Interactive map of Elenite
- Coordinates: 42°42′15″N 27°48′36″E
- Country: Bulgaria
- Province: Burgas Province

Elenite (Bulgarian: Елените) is a seaside resort on the southern Bulgarian Black Sea Coast in Burgas Province, eastern Bulgaria.

Elenite is situated on the southern slopes of the Stara Planina mountains, along the coast of the Black Sea, in Burgas Province. It is located 7 kilometres from Sveti Vlas, 10 kilometres (6.2 mi) from the resort town of Sunny Beach and 48 kilometres (30 mi) from Burgas.

The resort was seriously affected by catastrophic flash floods on October 3, 2025. The floods swept away dozens of cars and caused at least 3 deaths.

== Gallery ==
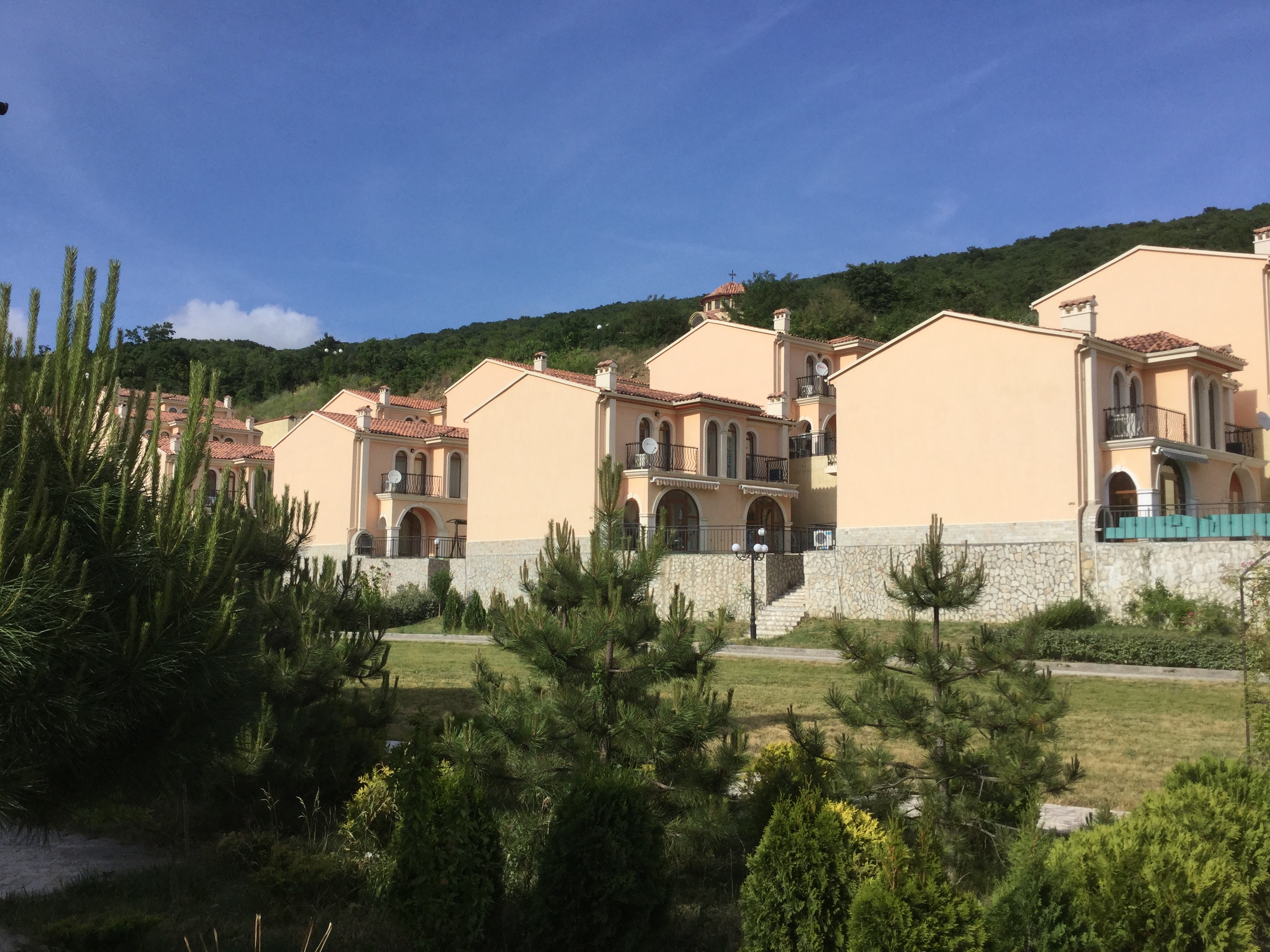
Villas Romana

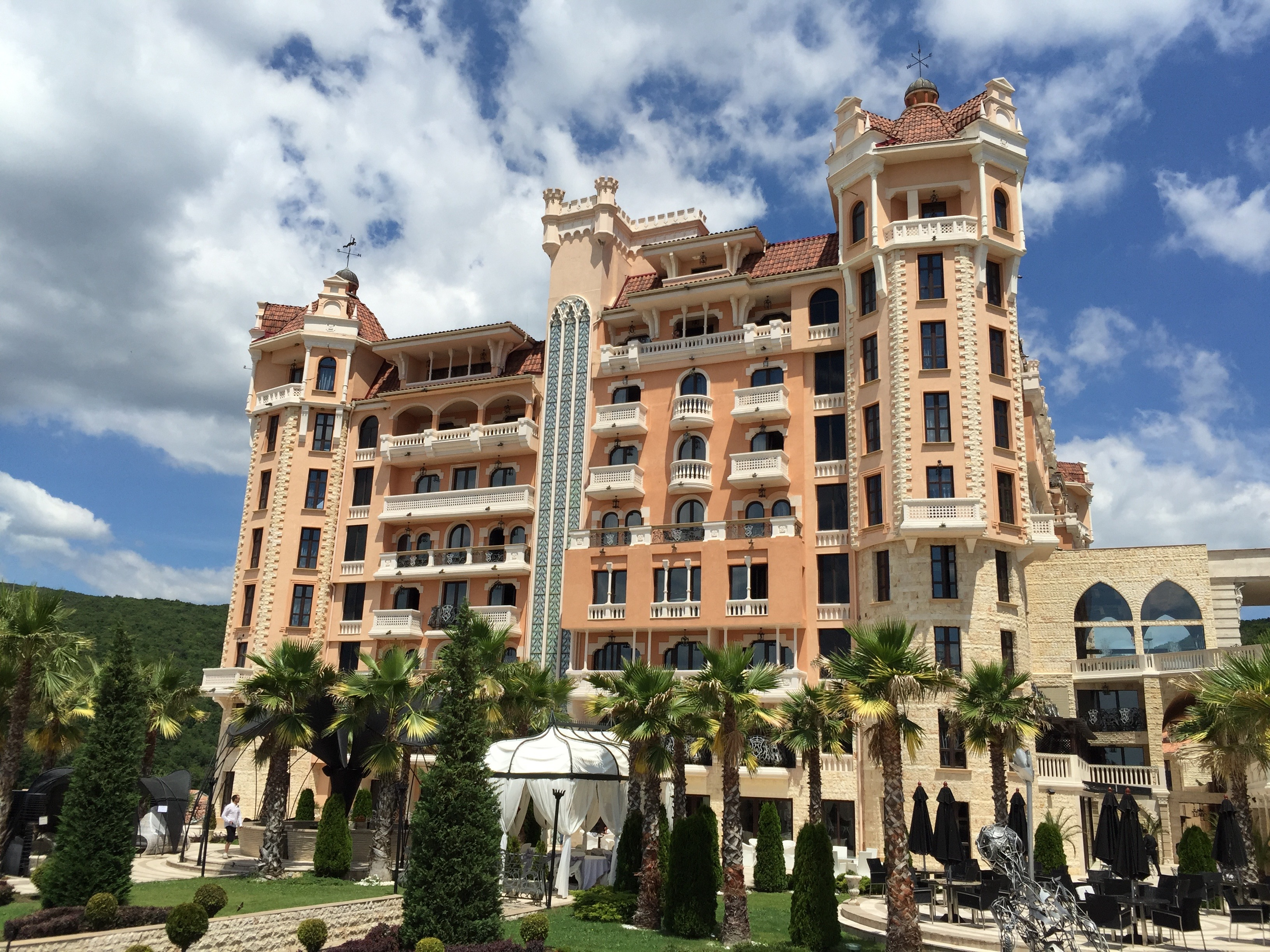
Hotel Royal Castle

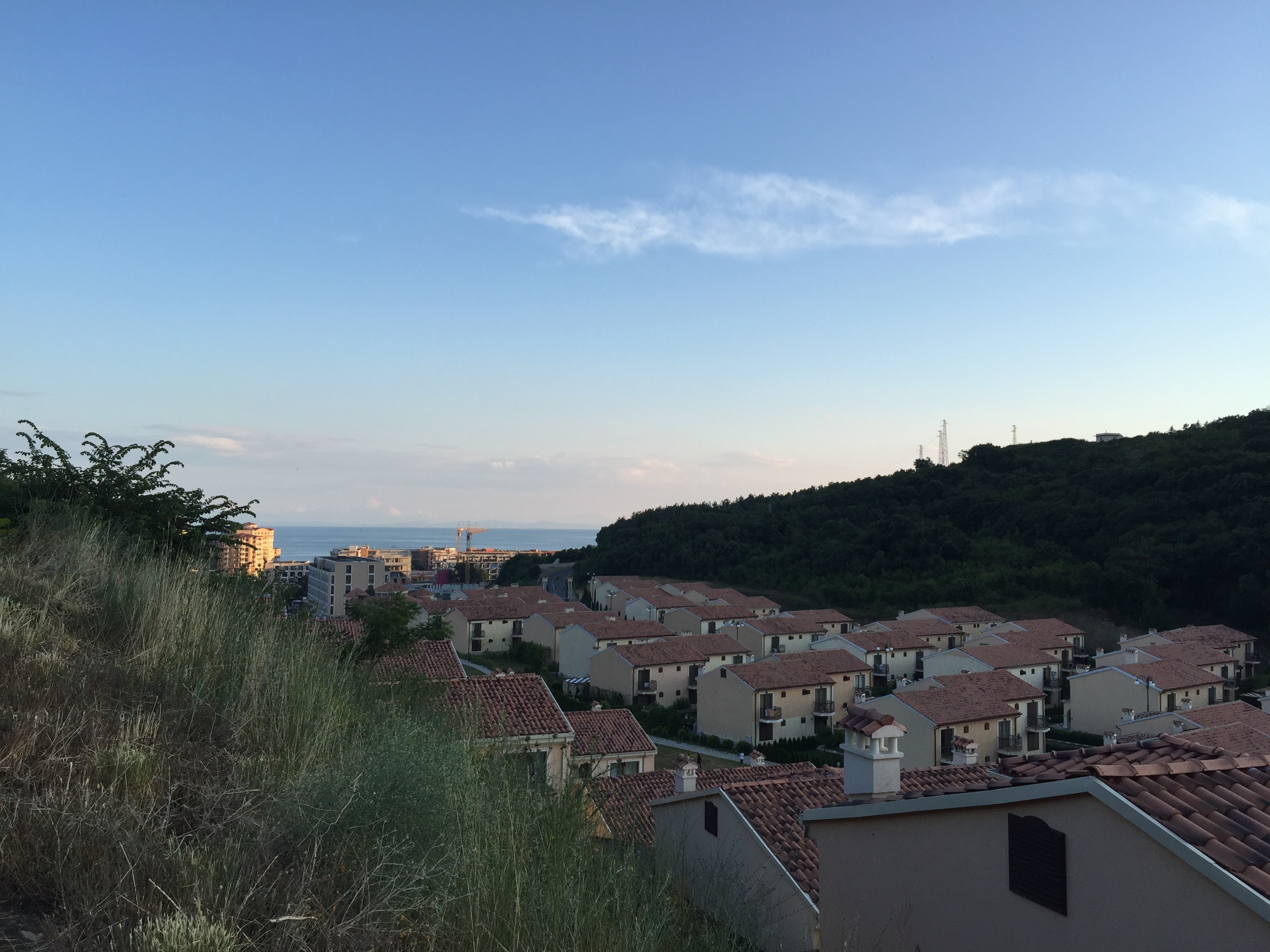
Villas Romana (view from the mountains)

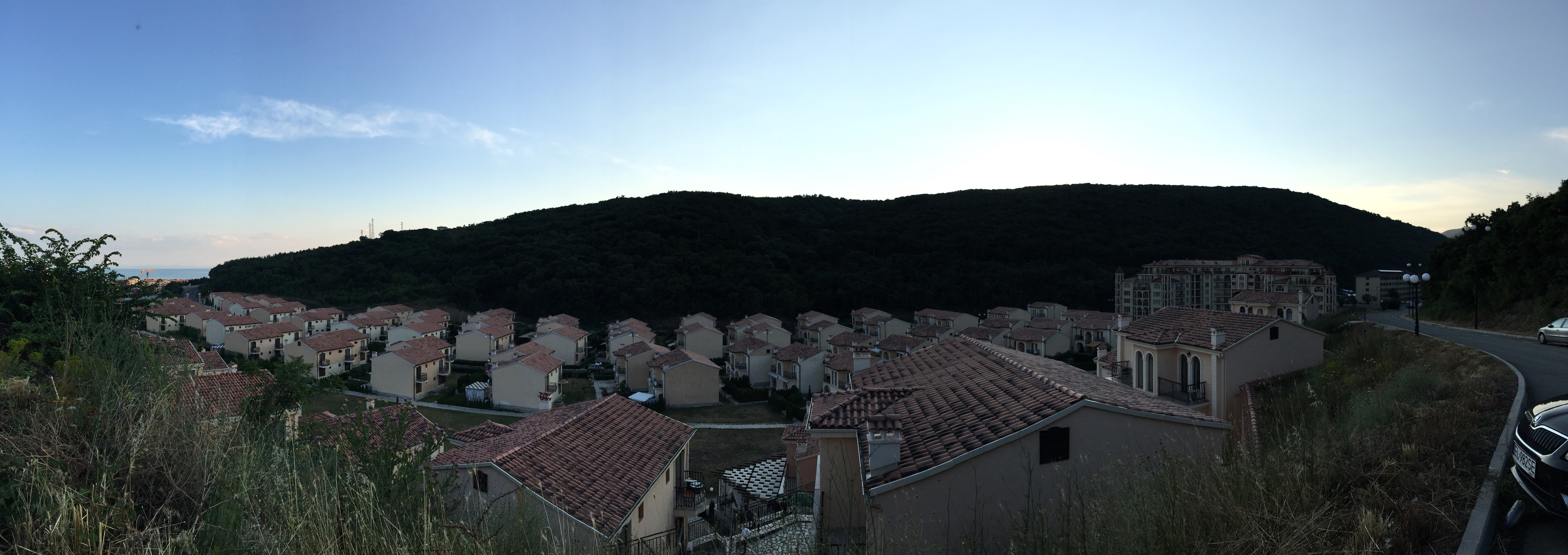
Villas Romana (panorama)
