= Rusalka, Bulgaria =

Seaside resort in Dobrich Province, Bulgaria

Coordinates: 43°25′N 28°30′E

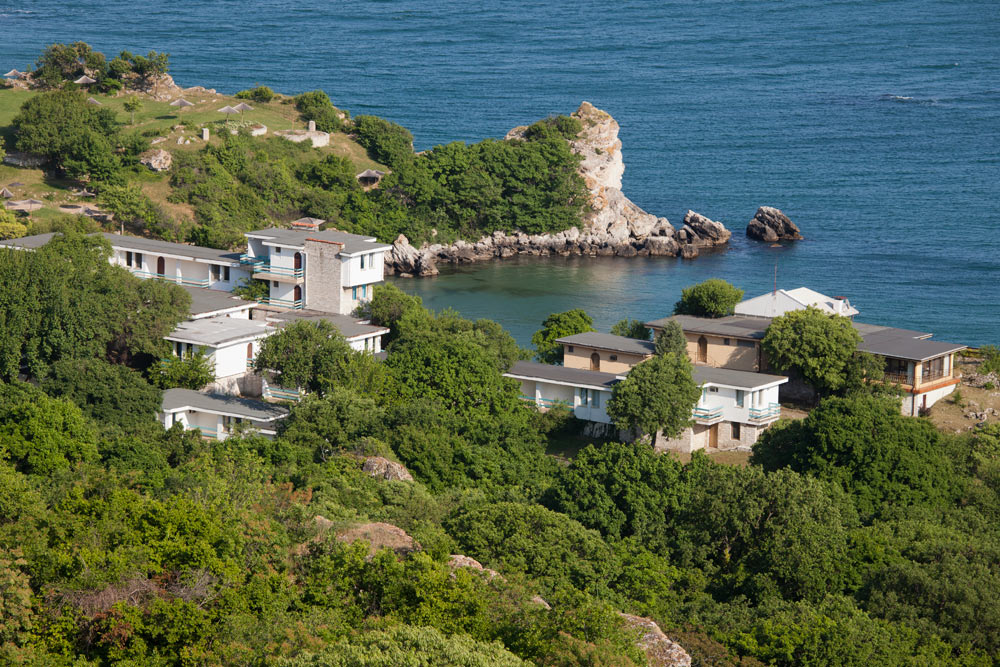
The Rusalka seaside resort

Rusalka (Bulgarian: Русалка, "mermaid"; also Russalka and Roussalka) is a seaside resort on the northern Bulgarian Black Sea Coast located in Dobrich Province, northeastern Bulgaria (the historical region of Southern Dobruja). It is located in a nature reserve in a bay 90 km northeast of Varna and 23 km from Shabla, surrounded by oak forests.

The whole resort is an all-inclusive area of 600 luxurious one-storey houses. It is a favoured place for foreign tourists, in the 2000s mainly from Germany, although in the 1990s it was a French-dominated area.

Rusalka offers 10 hard tennis courts and 5 clay ones, making it an appropriate destination for tennis fans, as well as a small football pitch and a volleyball court. Other sports that can be practised are archery, horse riding, yachting, kayaking, scuba diving, etc. The resort also has an open-air mineral-water swimming pool with water jets. Many islets and rocks lie just off the beach.

Attractions in the vicinity include the Yaylata and Kaliakra nature and history reserves.
