= Dyuni =

Resort town in southern Bulgaria

Dyuni Дюни
- Resort town
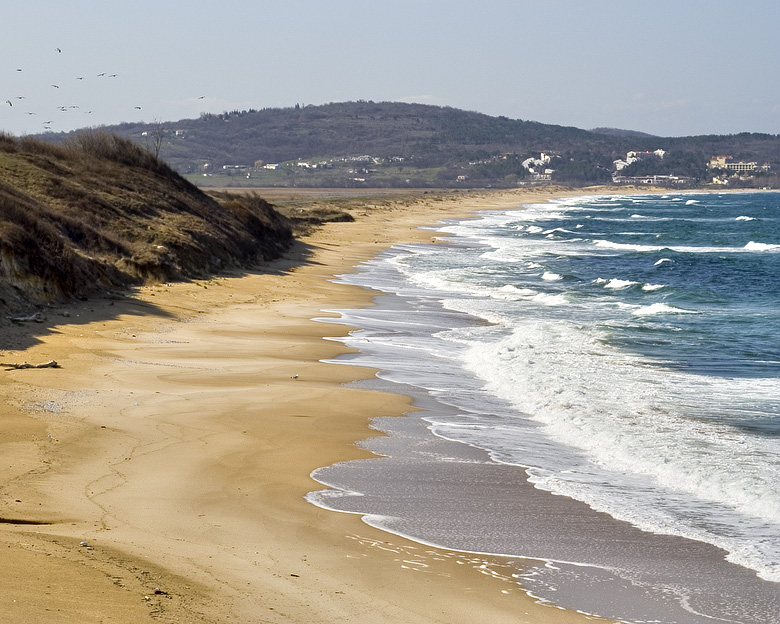
- A beach near Dyuni

- Location in Bulgaria
- Coordinates: 42°22′18″N 27°42′18″E
- Country: Bulgaria
- Province: Burgas
- Municipality: Sozopol
- Established: 1986
- Time zone: UTC+2 (EET)
  - Summer (DST): UTC+3 (EEST)

Dyuni (Bulgarian: Дюни, lit. 'Dunes') is a resort town on the Bulgarian Black Sea Coast, in Sozopol Municipality, Burgas Province, southern Bulgaria. It was purpose-built in 1986–1987 and features a large resort accompanied by several subsidiary hotels, restaurants, and entertainment venues. The resort is known particularly for its water sport activities and excursions to nearby nature reserves.

== Geography ==
Dyuni is situated along a small bay and is surrounded by pine forests and sand dunes that stretch along the coastline for approximately 4.5 kilometers. The town is located within Strandzha Nature Park, one of the largest protected areas in Bulgaria, and is surrounded by nature reserves featuring both coastal and mountainous environments. Lake Alen, a nearby lagoon, is popular among tourists interested in nature walks and birdwatching.

The town's three-kilometer beach is maintained by resort staff and the water quality is routinely checked by officials. Visitors to Dyuni often trek to the unregulated beaches of Alepou and Arkoutino located nearby, as they are less busy than the main beaches serving the resort.

== Climate ==
The climate in Dyuni is mild and temperate. In the summer months, daytime temperatures typically remain below 33 °C (91 °F), while sea temperatures hover around 24 to 25 °C (75 to 77 °F). The resort season begins in late spring and continues until mid-autumn, with August being the warmest month. The so-called "velvet season" in September and October offers pleasant weather with fewer tourists.

== Tourism ==
The Dyuni Royal Resort is the core of the town's hospitality industry and administers all the services in Dyuni, including restaurants, entertainment venues, and other hotels. Built in 1986–1987 by an Austrian company in the style of the Bulgarian National Revival period, the resort blends modern amenities with traditional architectural design, featuring wooden two-storey houses and wooden cottages. The resort has part of the Magic Life chain of resorts since 2002. Major hotels aside from the main resort include Marina Royal Palace, Holiday Village, and Pelikan.

The resort offers a wide array of recreational activities, particularly in water sports, such as yachting, water skiing, parasailing, and windsurfing. On land, facilities include tennis courts, volleyball and association football pitches, bicycle rentals, and equestrian excursions through the Strandzha mountains.

== Culture ==
Restaurants and cafes serve traditional Bulgarian cuisine, including a variety of local seafood. Cultural events include folklore evenings and the "Bulgarian Holiday in the Village", an event featuring traditional dance, music, and local crafts.

== Transport ==
Dyuni is accessible by road from Burgas Airport; the drive is approximately one hour. The town is located 40 kilometres (25 mi) south of the provincial capital of Burgas and 7 kilometres (4.3 mi) from the municipal capital of Sozopol.
