= Bulgarian Black Sea Coast =

Coordinates: 42.368°N 27.708°E

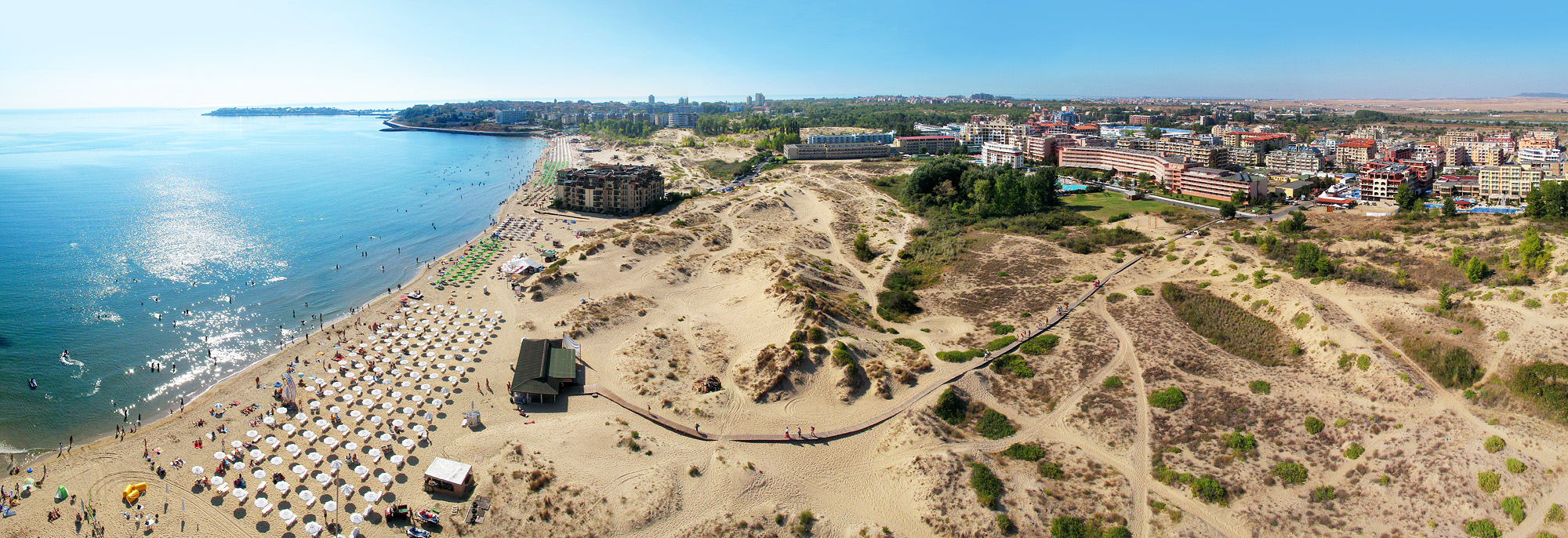
Sunny Beach aerial panorama

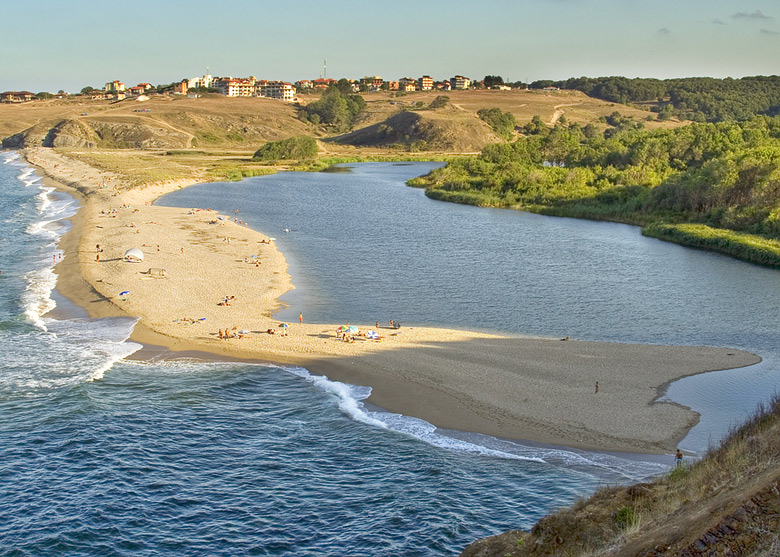
The Veleka River mouth at Sinemorets

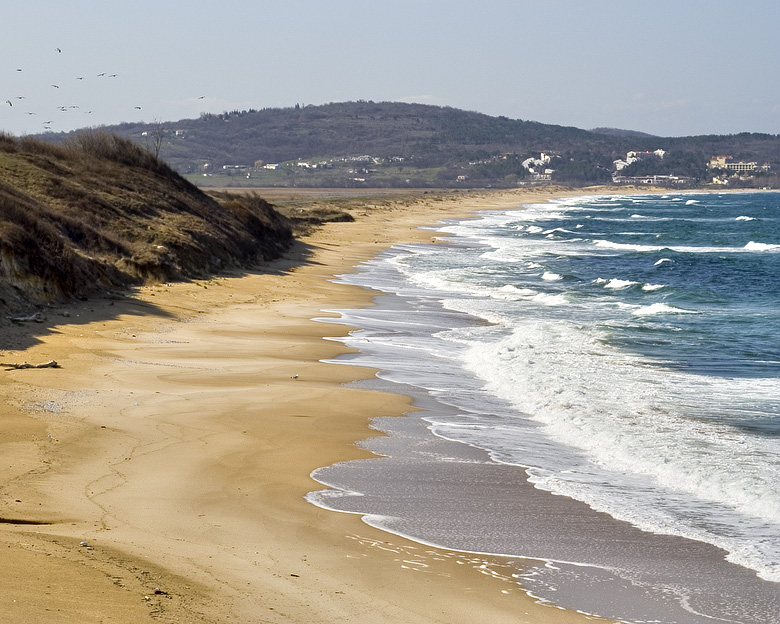
A beach close to Dyuni

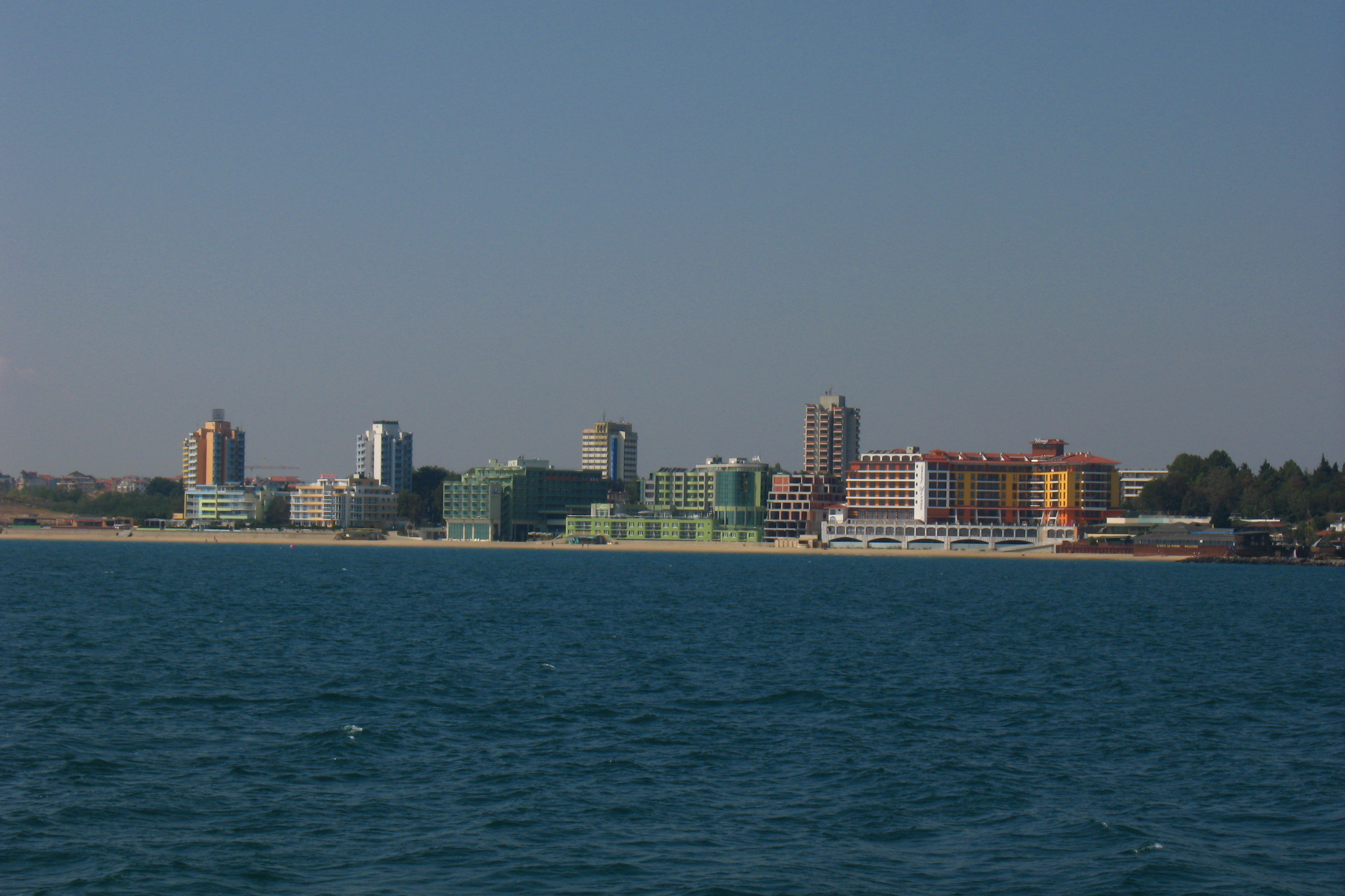
Nesebar

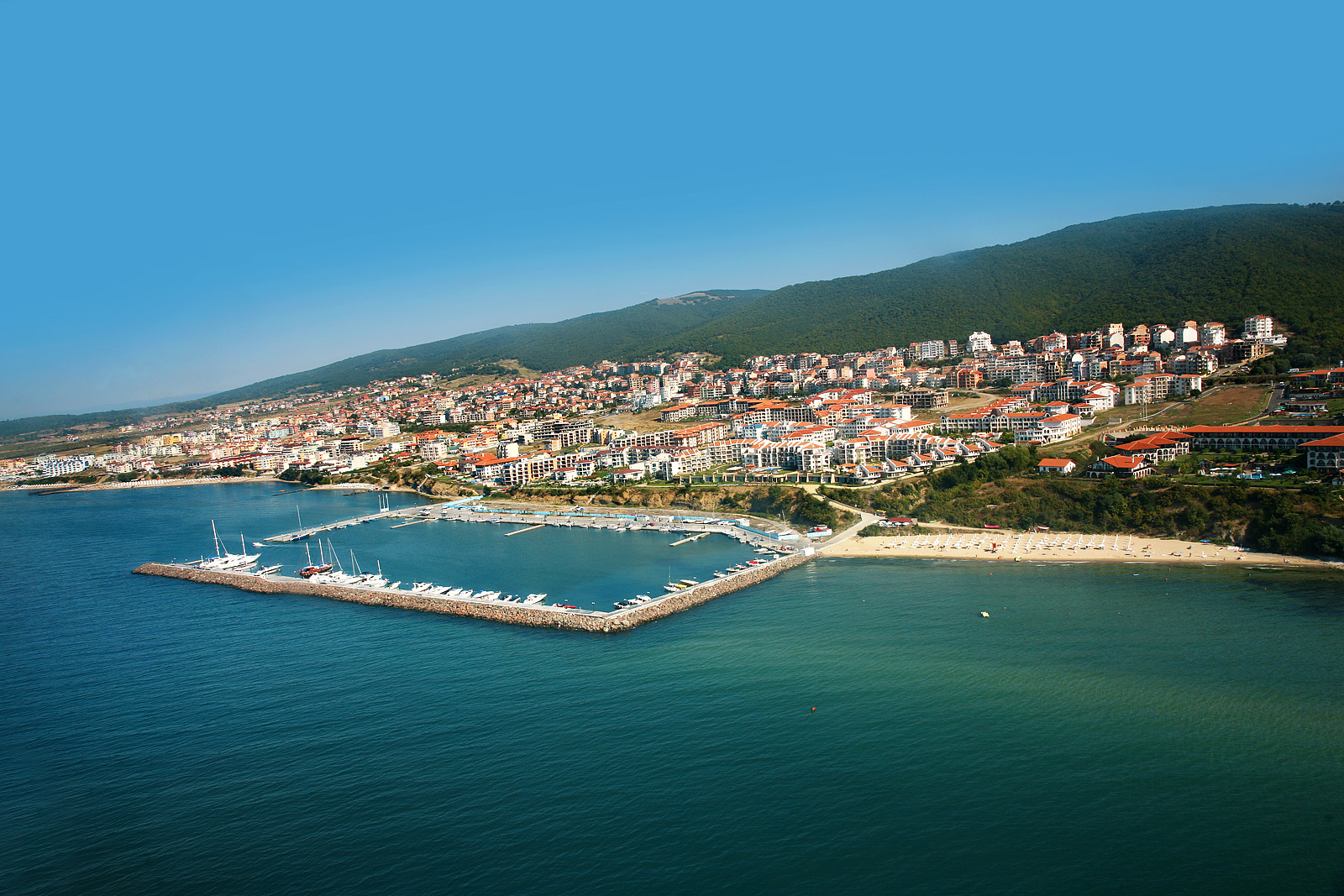
Sveti Vlas

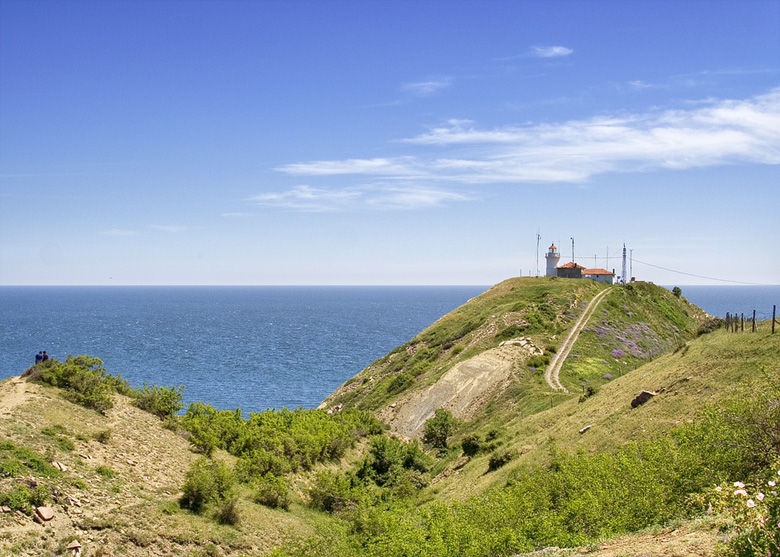
Cape Emine

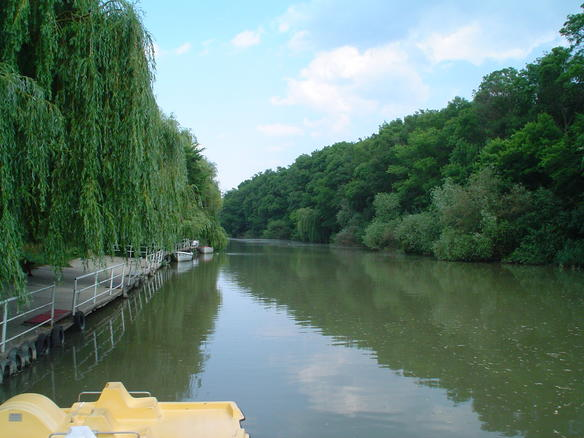
River Kamchiya

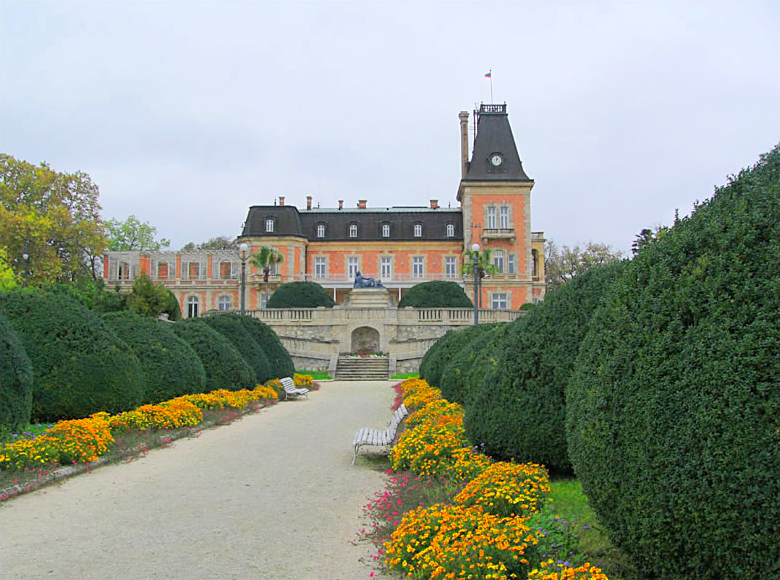
Euxinograd

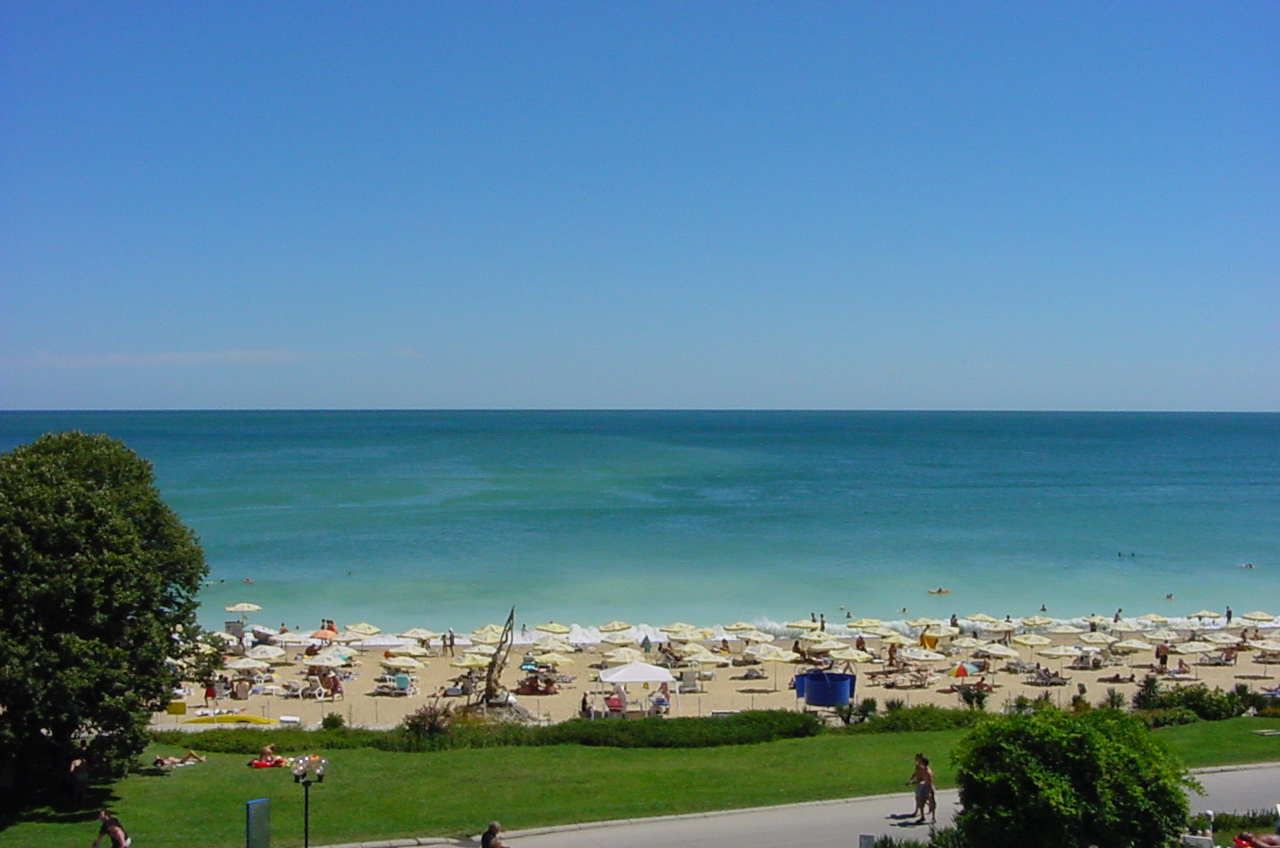
Golden Sands

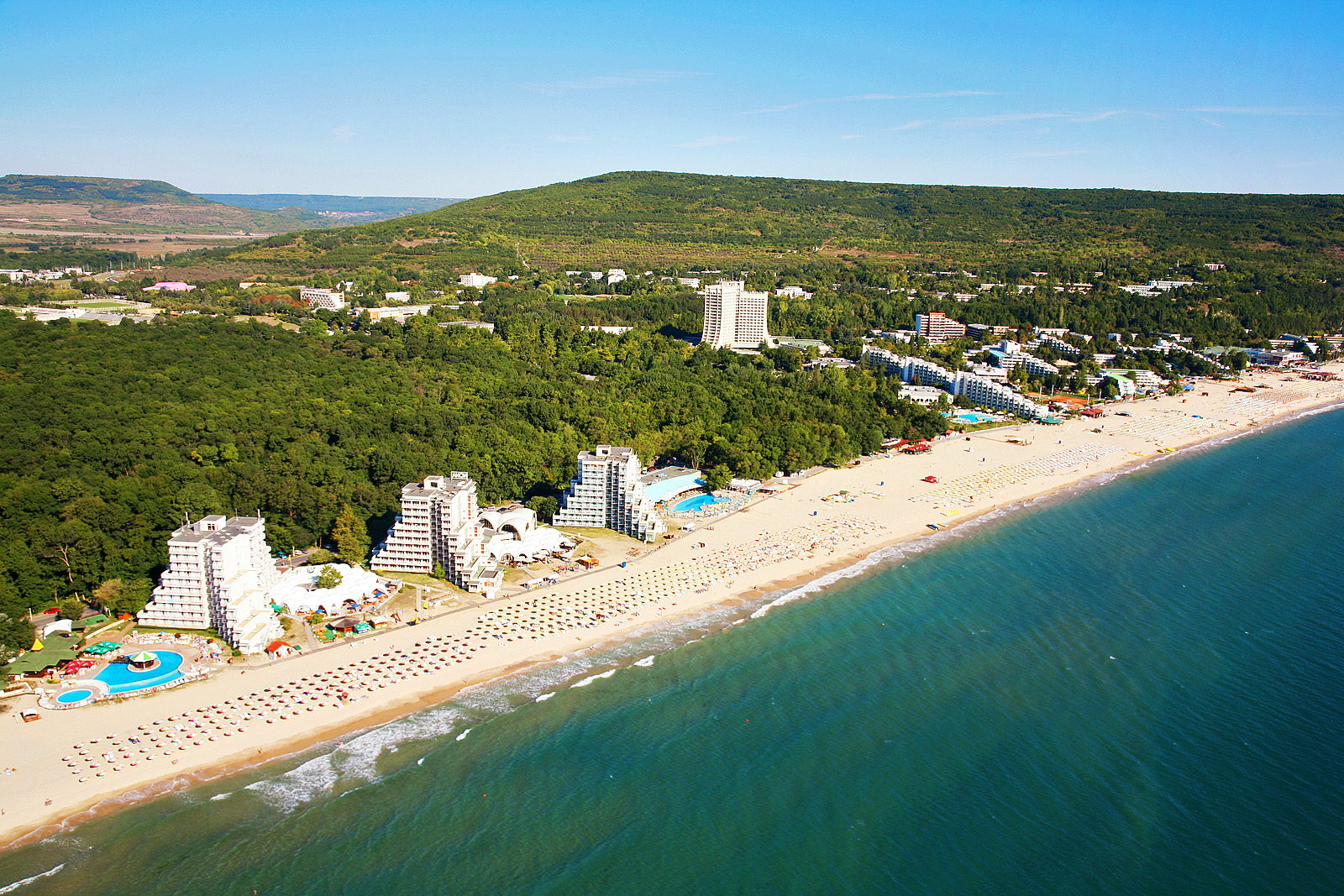
Albena

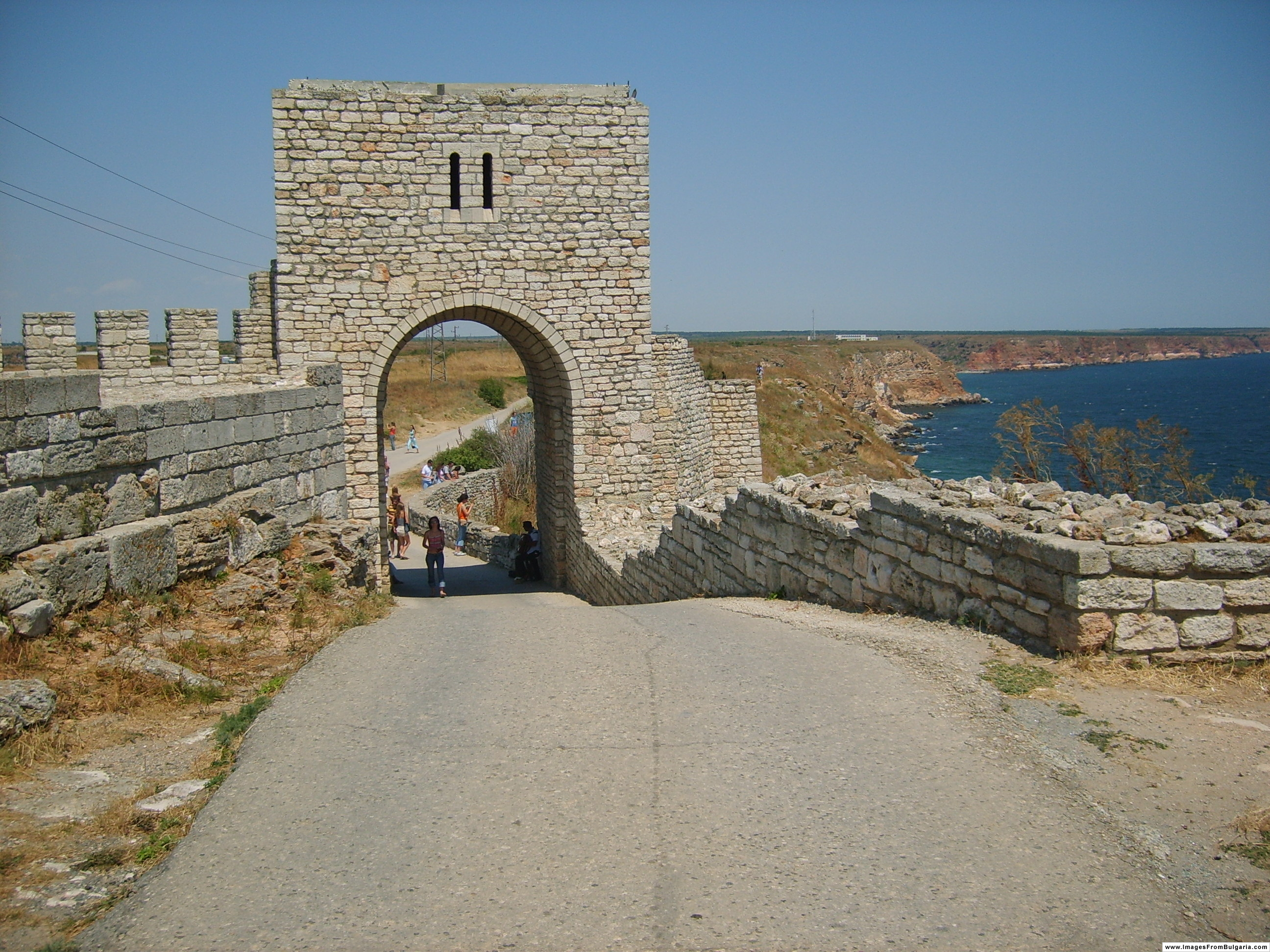
Cape Kaliakra

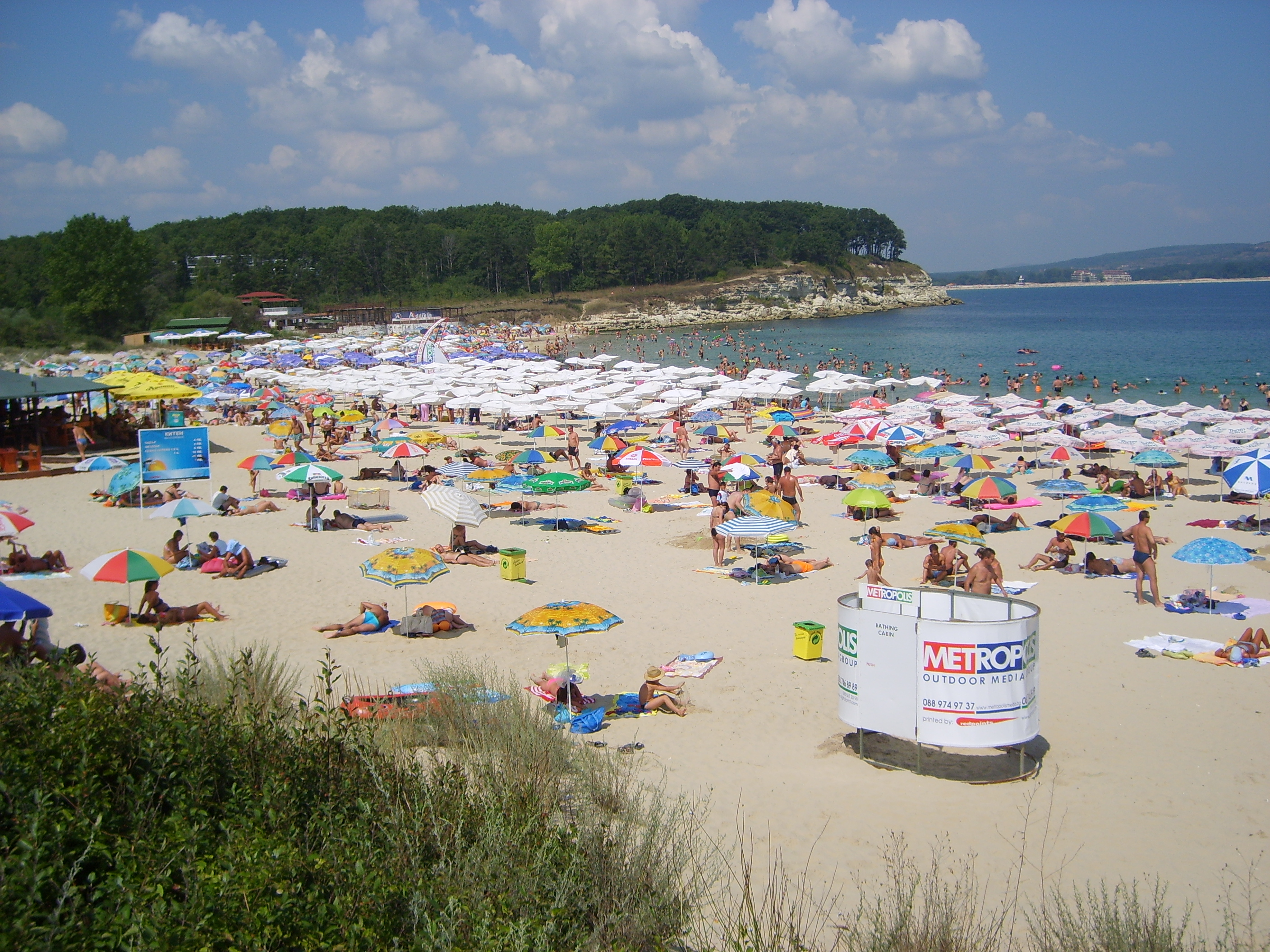
Kiten

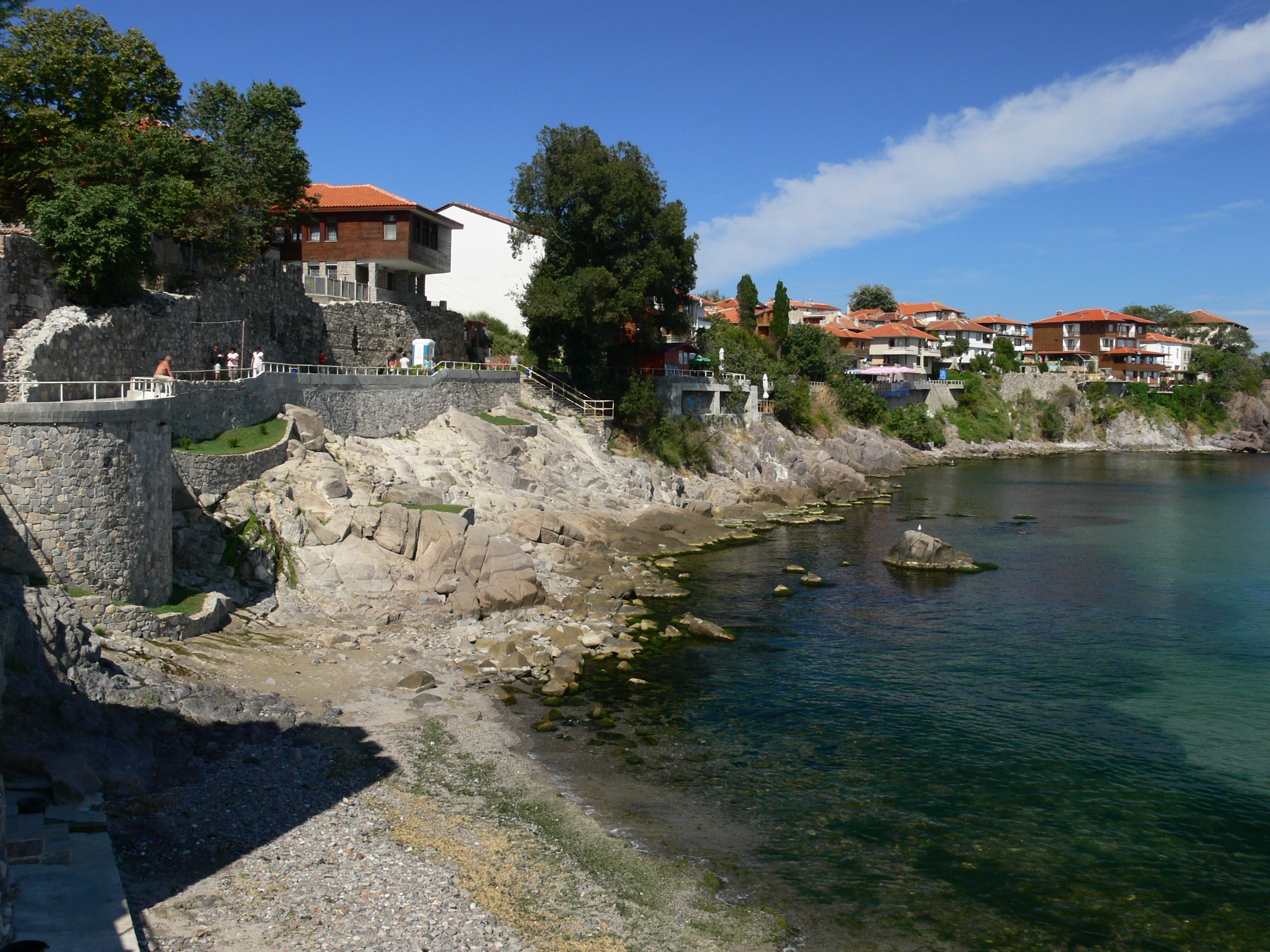
Sozopol

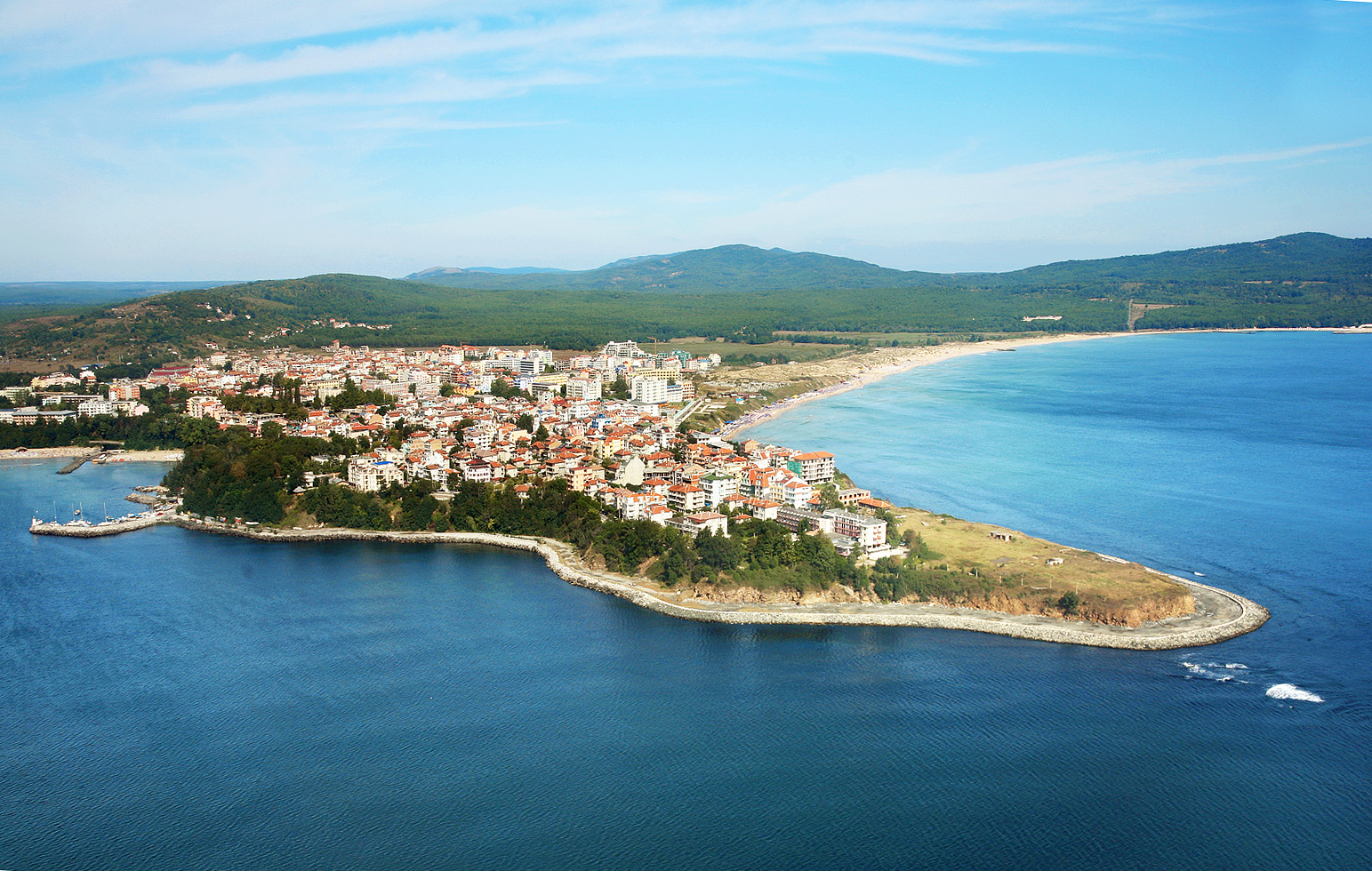
Primorsko

The Bulgarian Black Sea Coast (Bulgarian: Черноморие, romanized: Chernomorie), also known as the Bulgarian Riviera, covers the entire eastern bound of Bulgaria stretching from the Romanian Black Sea resorts in the north to European Turkey in the south, along 378 km of coastline. White and golden sandy beaches occupy approximately 130 km of the 378 km long coast. The region is an important center of tourism during the summer season (May–October), drawing millions of foreign and local tourists alike and constituting one of the country's most popular tourist destinations. Prior to 1989 the Bulgarian Black Sea coast was internationally known as the Red Riviera. Since the fall of the Iron Curtain, however, its nickname has been changed to the Bulgarian Riviera.

The Bulgarian Black Sea Coast has a humid subtropical climate (Köppen climate classification Cfa), with considerable maritime and continental influences. The area's average air temperature in the summer is about 28 °C, with the average water temperature at 26 °C. There are more than 240 hours of sunshine in May and September and more than 300 hours in July and August.

The Balkan Mountains cross the country reaching to the edge of the Black Sea at Cape Emine, dividing the coastline into a southern and northern part. Parts of Bulgaria's northern Black Sea Coast feature rocky headlands where the sea abuts cliffs up to 70 metres in height. The southern coast is known for its wide sandy beaches. The southernmost section is included in Strandzha Nature Park.

The two largest cities and main seaports on the Bulgarian Riviera are Varna (third largest in the country) and Burgas (fourth largest in the country). Varna is located on the northern part of the coast and Burgas is located on the southern coast. The two cities' international airports, Varna Airport and Burgas Airport, are the main hubs servicing the region. In addition, the Trakia motorway (A1) was completed in 2013, providing fast access between Burgas and Sofia, the capital of Bulgaria, and Plovdiv, the second largest city. Hemus motorway (A2), scheduled to be completed after 2020, would make the trip from Sofia to Varna substantially easier and faster, while the Cherno More motorway (A5) is planned to connect Varna and Burgas. Major road I-9 runs along the Black Sea coast between the border with Romania, at the village of Durankulak, and the city of Burgas.

== Largest cities ==
- Varna
- Burgas
- Tsarevo
- Balchik
- Nesebar
- Kavarna
- Sozopol
- Pomorie

== Major resorts and attractions ==
- Durankulak
- Krapets
- Shabla
- Tyulenovo
- Kamen Bryag
- Yaylata
- Rusalka
- Balgarevo
- Kavarna
- Bozhurets
- Beglik Tash
- Topola
- Tuzlata
- Albena
- Kranevo
- Golden Sands
- Golden Sands Nature Park
- Holiday Club Riviera
- Chaika
- Sunny Day (Kokodiva)
- Constantine and Helena
- Galata
- Fichoza
- Kamchia (resort)
- Kamchia (biosphere reserve)
- Shkorpilovtsi
- Karadere
- Byala
- Obzor
- Irakli
- Elenite
- Sveti Vlas
- Sunny Beach
- Ravda
- Pomorie
- Sarafovo
- Atia
- Chernomorets
- Kavatsite
- Dyuni
- Primorsko
- Kiten
- Lozenets
- Tsarevo
- Strandzha Nature Park
- Varvara
- Sinemorets
- Rezovo

== Historic sites ==
- Aheloy
- Ahtopol
- Balchik
- Euxinograd
- Kaliakra
- Nesebar (UNESCO World Heritage Site)
- Sozopol

== Islands ==
- St. Anastasia Island
- St. Cyricus Island
- St. Ivan Island
- St. Peter Island
- St. Thomas Island

== Rivers ==
- Aheloy
- Batova
- Dvoynitsa
- Fakiyska
- Hadzhiyska
- Kamchiya
- Provadiya
- Rezovska
- Ropotamo
- Shkorpilovska
- Veleka

== See also ==
- Tourism in Bulgaria
- Riviera, featuring links to articles on the many coastal strips around the world which are known as Riviera
- Romanian Black Sea resorts
