= Primorsko =

Primorsko Приморско
- Town
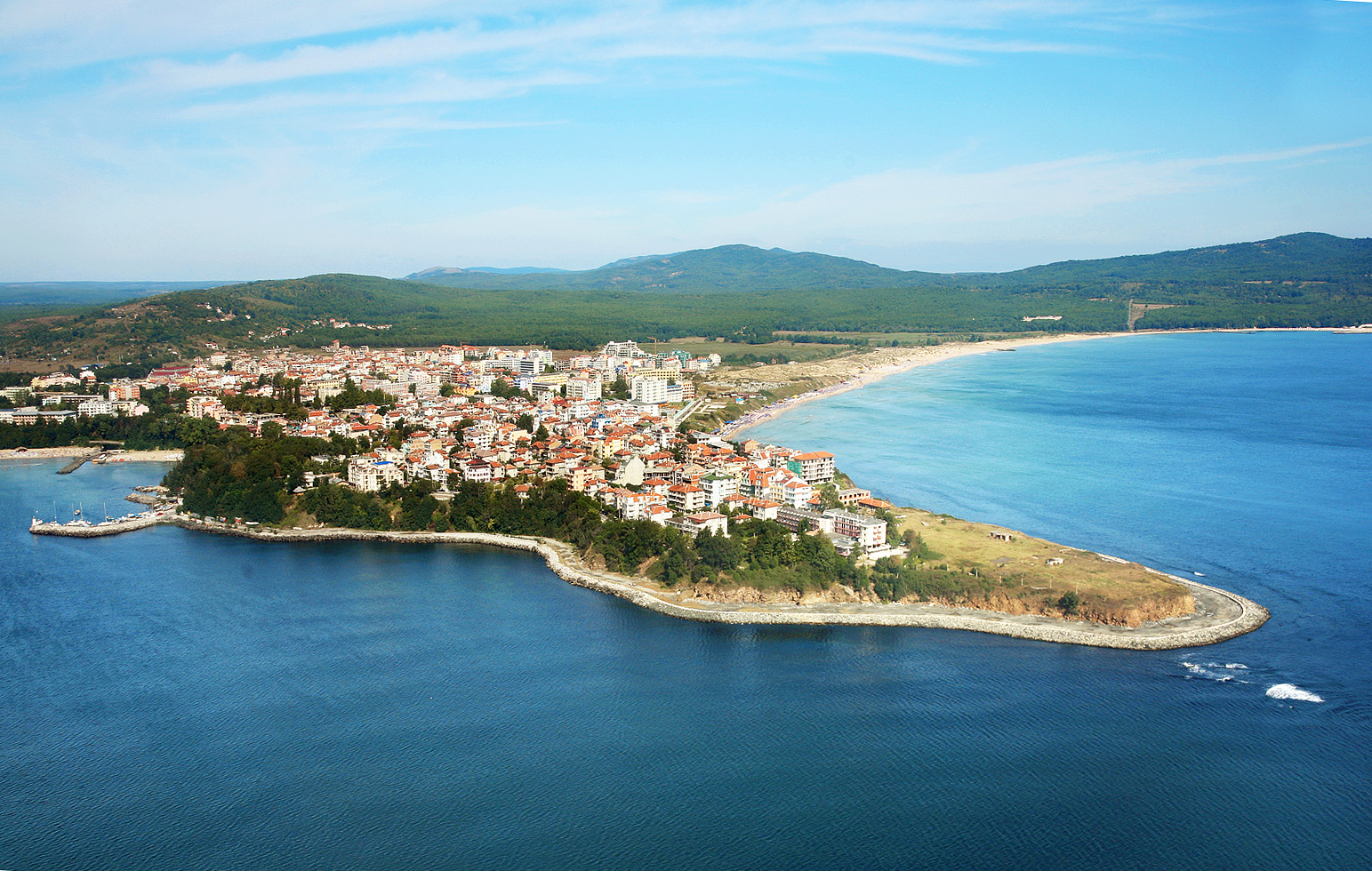

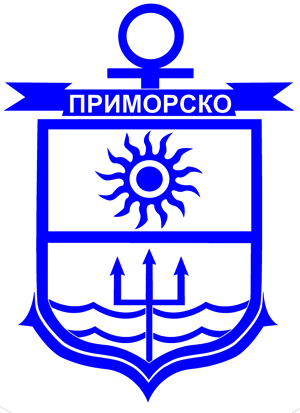
- Coat of arms

- Location of Primorsko within Bulgaria
- Coordinates: 42°16′N 27°46′E
- Country: Bulgaria
- Province: Burgas
- Municipality: Primorsko

Government
  - Mayor: Ivan Gaykov (GERB)

Area
  - Total: 69.415 km^{2} (26.801 sq mi)
- Elevation: 5 m (16 ft)

Population (2015)
  - Total: 3,531
  - Density: 50.87/km^{2} (131.7/sq mi)
- Time zone: UTC+2 (EET)
  - Summer (DST): UTC+3 (EEST)
- Postal Code: 8180
- Area code: 0550
- Website: primorsko.bg

Primorsko (Bulgarian: Приморско, lit. 'seaside'; [priˈmɔrsko]) is a town and seaside resort in southeastern Bulgaria, the capital of the municipality of the same name, and part of Burgas Province. It is a resort on the Bulgarian Black Sea Coast, and is located 52 km south of Burgas. The Ropotamo nature reserve and Snake Island reserve are nearby.

== History ==
Remains of stone anchors from the second half of the 2nd millennium and the 1st millennium BC have been discovered in the waters around Primorsko, which can possibly be linked to Neolithic navigation. Remains of lead anchors from the 4th-5th century BC have also been found, as well as traces of Copper Age pottery and stone tools. Valchanovo kale, the ruins of a nearby medieval fortress, which inhabited from the Early Iron Age to the Late Middle Ages, are often linked with the fortress of Ranouli mentioned in the Hambarli inscription of Krum of Bulgaria. Medieval amphoras and pottery have been found in the mouth of the Ropotamo, and the ancient waystation and fortress of Gera is thought to have been located on Maslen nos.

Ottoman documents of the 16th century mention a locality called Zonarita in the area. The eastern traveler Evliya Çelebi marks a cove by the name of Küprü liman at the place. During the Ottoman rule of Bulgaria, there existed a pier used to transport Strandzha wood and charcoal to Constantinople and other major cities.

The modern Primorsko was founded in 1879 as Kyupria by four families from Zabernovo and Balgari (who had left their villages after the Berlin treaty left them in Turkey), who cleared the forest and built houses. In the vicinity were two abandoned Circassian villages; the Circassians had fled to Turkey fearing retribution for their atrocities in Bulgaria. Other Bulgarians from Central Strandzha came and briefly populated these villages but then decided that Kyupriya's pier is a better source of income and soon moved there, despite the danger of malaria which Dyavolsko blato (Devil's Swamp) constituted.

The town was renamed Primorsko in 1934. Primorsko was declared a national sea resort in 1953. In 1981, it was merged with Kiten and became a town. In a 1998 local referendum, it split from Tsarevo Municipality and became a seat of Primorsko Municipality. One of the smaller towns in Bulgaria by population, Primorsko has seen a remarkable increase in residents in recent years, topping the list of Bulgarian towns by population growth between December 2004 and June 2005 with 13.5%.

== Transportation ==
The city has its own airport; its runway being too short for airliners, it has no scheduled service, serving only recreational and private aircraft.

== Climate ==
Primorsko has a humid subtropical climate (Köppen climate classification: Cfa) bordering on a mediterranean climate with light continental influences.

Climate data for Primorsko (2000-2014)
Month	Jan	Feb	Mar	Apr	May	Jun	Jul	Aug	Sep	Oct	Nov	Dec	Year
Mean daily maximum °C (°F)	5 (41)	7 (45)	10 (50)	15 (59)	20 (68)	25 (77)	26 (79)	26 (79)	23 (73)	18 (64)	11 (52)	7 (45)	16 (61)
Daily mean °C (°F)	2 (36)	3 (37)	6 (43)	10 (50)	15 (59)	20 (68)	22 (72)	21 (70)	18 (64)	16 (61)	11 (52)	7 (45)	12.6 (54.7)
Mean daily minimum °C (°F)	−1 (30)	−1 (30)	2 (36)	6 (43)	10 (50)	15 (59)	17 (63)	16 (61)	13 (55)	8 (46)	3 (37)	1 (34)	7 (45)
Average precipitation mm (inches)	44 (1.7)	37 (1.5)	48 (1.9)	70 (2.8)	50 (2.0)	62 (2.4)	48 (1.9)	28 (1.1)	46 (1.8)	52 (2.0)	68 (2.7)	45 (1.8)	598 (23.5)
Source: weatherbase.com{=1981-2011}

== Gallery ==
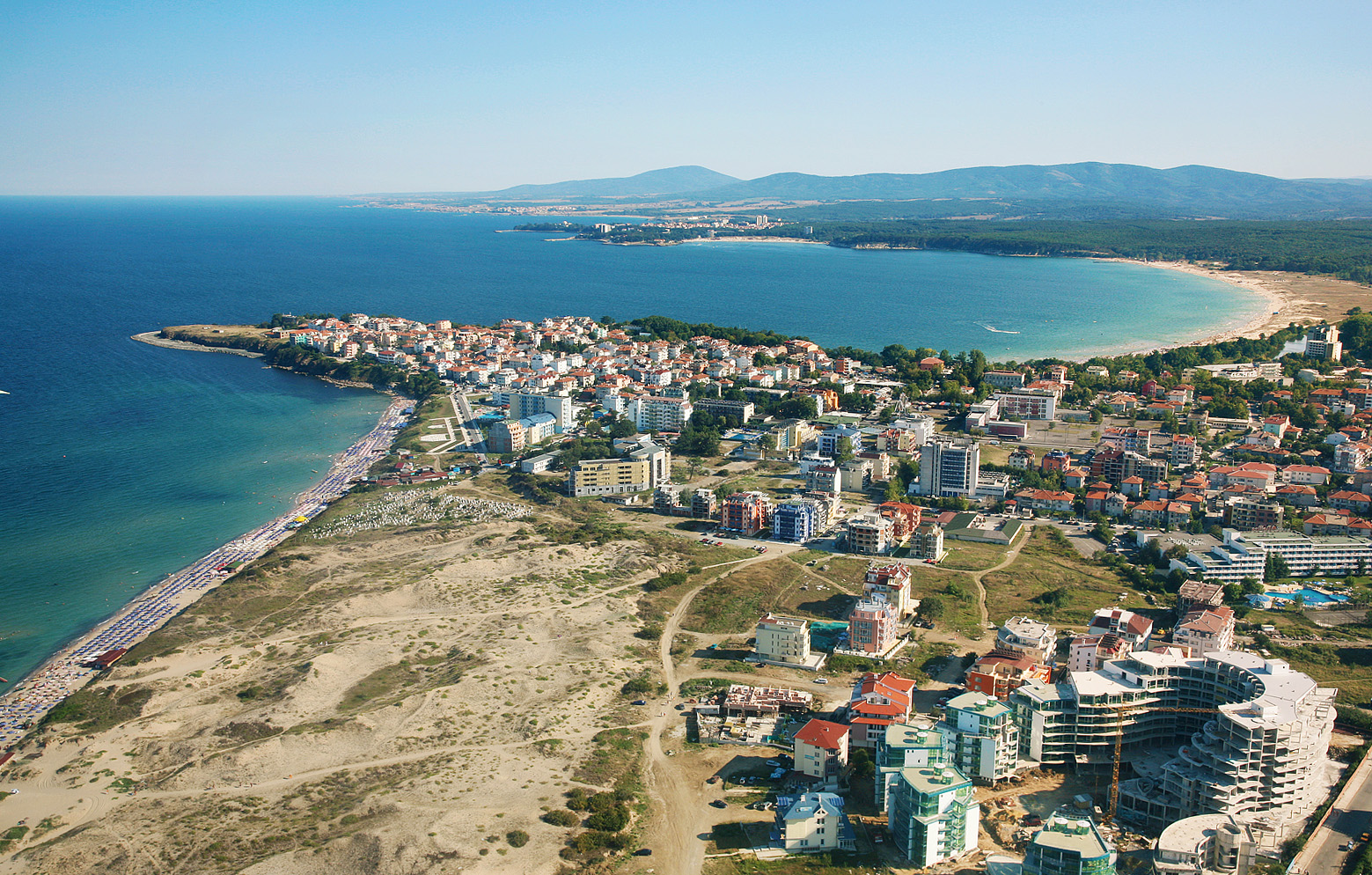
Aerial view

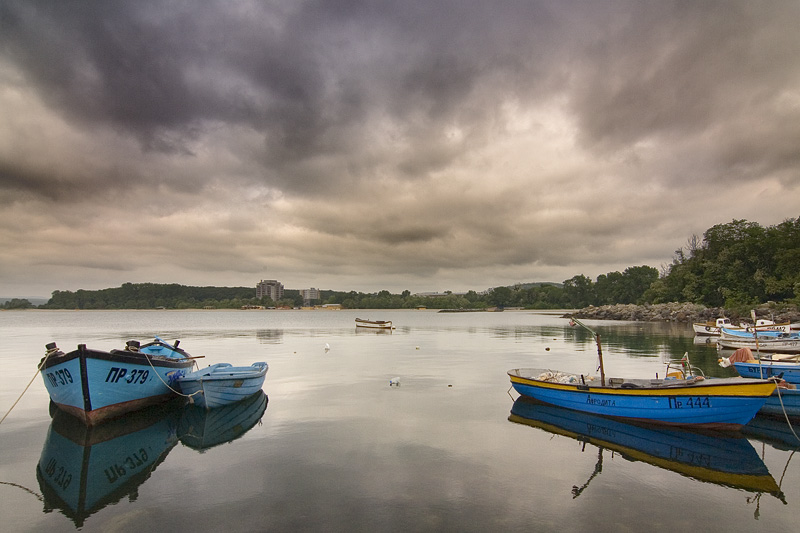
Port of Primorsko

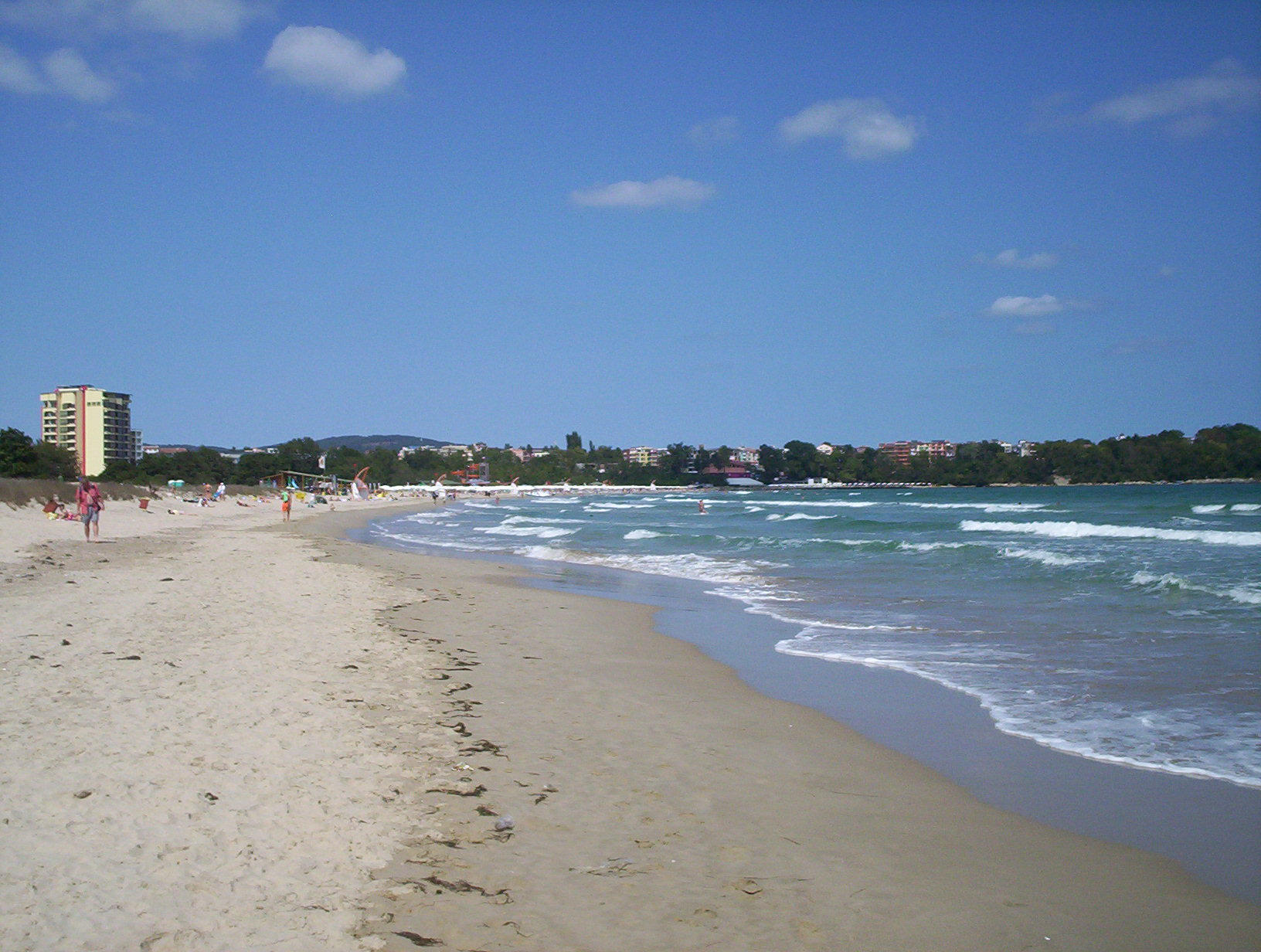
Primorsko seen from the beach

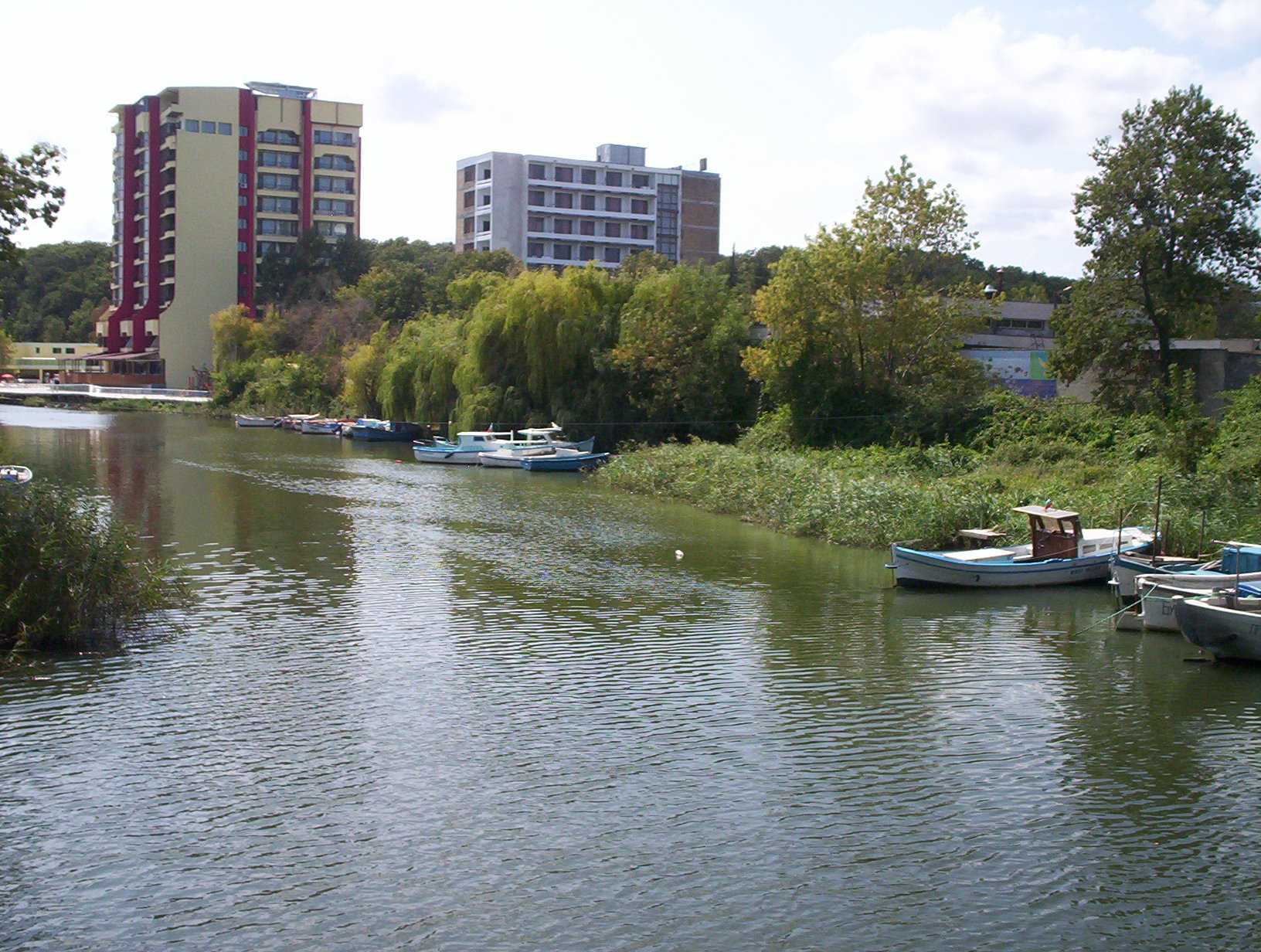
Dyavolska reka
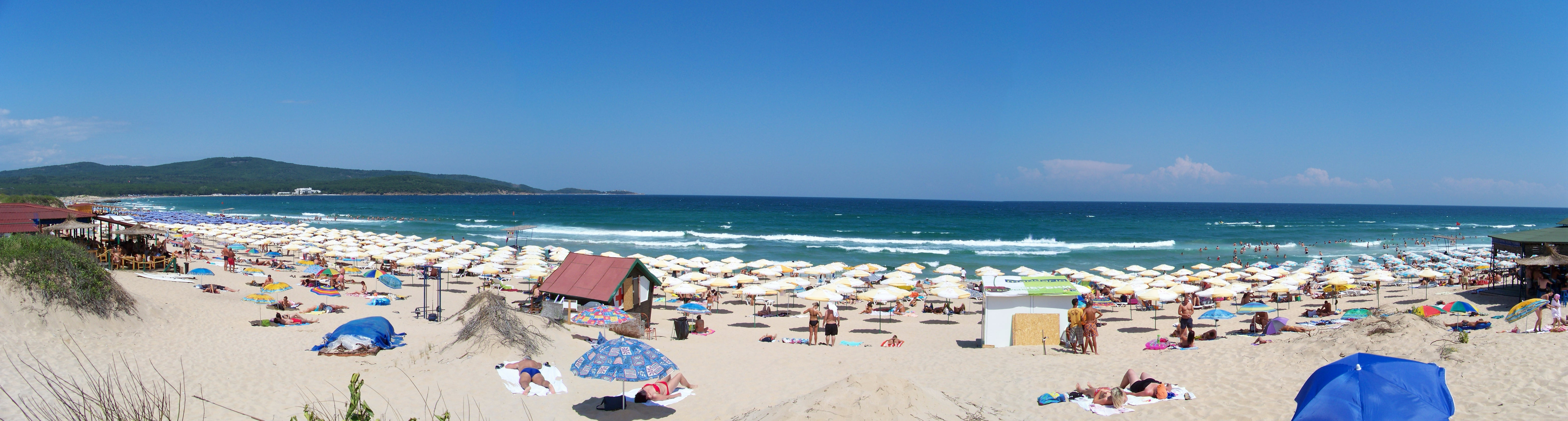
Panorama from the beach of Primorsko
