= Yaylata =

Coordinates: 43°26′4″N 28°32′25″E

Yaylata reserve

Yaylata is a protected area in Sveti Nikola village in Dobrich province, Bulgaria. It is part of the network of protected areas Natura 2000.
