= Bosna (ridge) =

Mountain ridge in Bulgaria

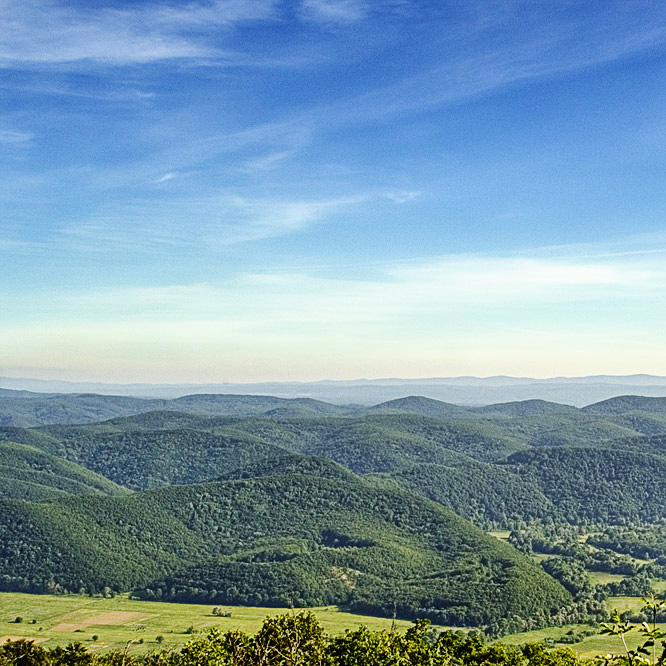

Bosna (Bulgarian: Босна) is a ridge in the northern reaches of the Strandzha mountain range situated in the south-eastern part of the Balkan peninsula close to the Black Sea coast. While Strandzha is shared between Bulgaria and Turkey, the Bosna ridge is located entirely within the Bulgarian section of the mountain range. Its highest peak is Papiya (501,4 m). The ridge is approximately 65 km in length and 25 km in width. Most of Bosna falls within the borders of Strandzha Nature Park, the largest protected area in Bulgaria.
