= Avren, Varna Province =

Avren Аврен
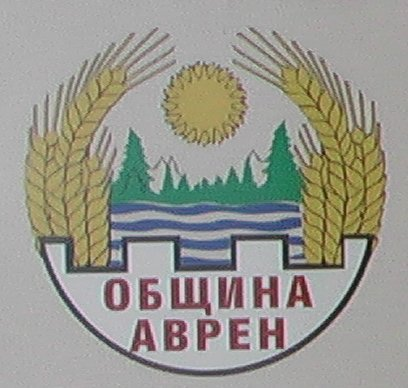
- Coat of arms

- Location of Avren
- Coordinates: 43°07′N 27°40′E
- Country: Bulgaria
- Provinces (Oblast): Varna

Government
  - Mayor: Krasimir Todorov
- Elevation: 404 m (1,325 ft)

Population (2008)
  - Total: 804
- Time zone: UTC+2 (EET)
  - Summer (DST): UTC+3 (EEST)
- Postal Code: 9135
- Area code: 05106

Avren (Bulgarian: Аврен, pronounced [ɐvˈrɛn]) is a village in northeastern Bulgaria, part of Varna Province. It is the administrative centre of the homonymous Avren Municipality in the eastern part of Varna Province.

== Village ==
The village of Avren lies 30 km south of the city of Varna, the largest city on the Bulgarian Black Sea Coast.

Avren is located in the Avren Plateau, near the valleys of the Kamchiya and Provadiya Rivers, very close to the Bulgarian Black Sea Coast. The climate is a moderate continental one, with microclimatic variances due to the influence of the Black Sea basin.

The village has a church dedicated to Saint Petka built in 1868. There is also a local observatory that is affiliated with the Nicholas Copernicus public astronomical observatory and planetarium in Varna. Avren's old name was Momino.

=== Economy ===
Major branches of the village economy are agriculture, ecological tourism, village tourism, commerce and services. Investment opportunities for wine making and vine growing are supported by a favorable climate and easy access to water.

=== Sport ===
There is a football stadium in the village that supports a football club, Avren FC. Adjacent to the stadium are other sports facilities for the use of Avren youth groups.

There are advanced plans for building a new golf and leisure facility to the south east of the town. The business plan for Avren Golf has already been approved by Avren Municipality and is due to be completed in 2012/13.

== Municipality ==
The Avren municipality borders the Black Sea (20 km) in the east and the municipalities of Varna, Beloslav, Dolni Chiflik and Provadia. The municipality covers an area of 380 square kilometres and includes the following 17 places:

- Avren
- Benkovski
- Bliznatsi
- Bolyartsi
- Dabravino
- Dobri Dol
- Kazashka Reka
- Kitka
- Krusha
- Priseltsi
- Ravna Gora
- Sadovo
- Sindel
- Trastikovo
- Tsarevtsi
- Yunak
- Zdravets

=== Geography ===
The altitude ranges from 50–380 meters above sea level, and generally slopes southwards.

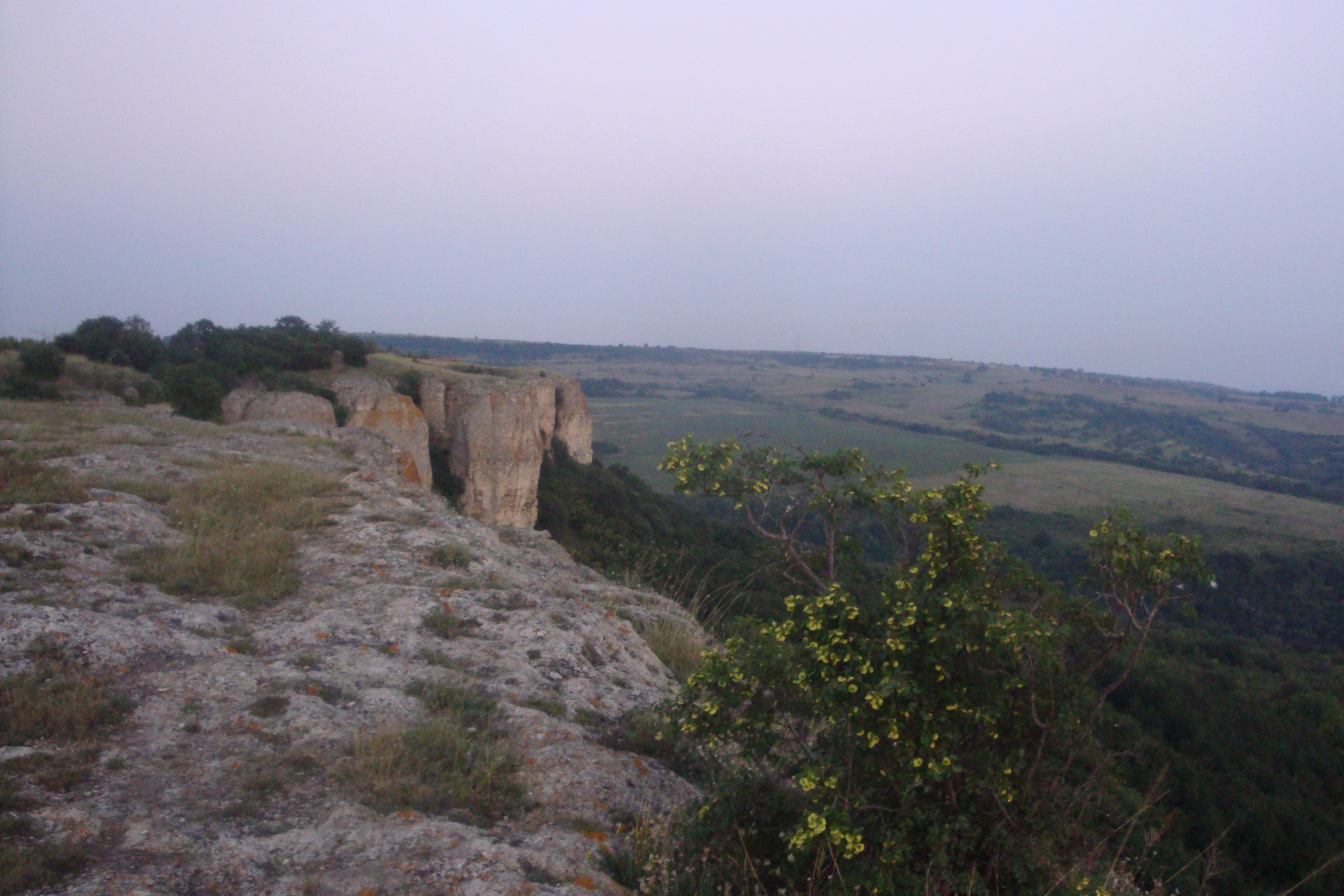
Picturesque cliffs in the Avren Municipality that overlook Petrich Kale

About 4% of municipal land in the eastern part of the region is protected territory. This includes the Kamchia Reservation encompassing 842 hectares along the banks of the Kamchia River. The reserve is listed as a biosphere reservation of UNESCO. All activities that may have a negative impact on the reservation: clear felling, industrial fishing, industrial gathering of herbs, mushrooms and flowers, the use of motorboats and the parking of vehicles near the river are limited in the zone. The Kamchiiski Piasatsi protected area runs along the coast strip of the municipality. The area is one of the unique habitats of the black stork and over 20 other species of migratory and water birds.

=== Culture ===
There are 85 monuments of cultural significance located in the municipality including 1 monastery, 3 churches, 2 mosques, 8 ancient settlements and 54 Renaissance houses. Near the villages of Benkovski and Bolyartsi there are remnants of ancient settlements and burial mounds. There are also medieval era sites including the Keshishlik rock-cut monastery and the Petrich Kale fortress. The most recent ruins found at the Petirch Kale fortress are from between the 11th and 14th centuries AD. This fortress was built on the site of an earlier Byzantine era fortress dating back to the 5th century AD. The remnants of the fortress walls, and enormous rock-cut cistern and a staircase have been preserved until present day.

The municipality supports 15 community cultural centers which run 10 amateur folklore groups, 4 choirs, and 6 traditional children's dance groups.

== Honour ==
Avren Rocks in Robert Island, South Shetland Islands are named after Avren.
