= II-55 road (Bulgaria) =

Road in Bulgaria

Republic Road I-55
- Републикански път I-55

Route information
- Length: 190 km (120 mi)

Major junctions
- From: Km 110.0 of I-5 near Debelets
- To: Km 370.7 of I-8, Svilengrad

Location
- Country: Bulgaria
- Towns: Debelets, Kilifarevo, Gurkovo, Nova Zagora, Svilengrad

Highway system
- Highways in Bulgaria

Republican Road II-55 (Bulgarian: Републикански път II-55) is a 2nd class road in Bulgaria, running in direction north–south through the territory of Veliko Tarnovo, Stara Zagora, Sliven and Haskovo Provinces. Its length is 190 km.

== Route description ==
The road starts at Km 110.0 of the first class I-5 road south of the town of Debelets in Veliko Tarnovo Province and proceeds south along the valley of the river Belitsa, a right tributary of the Yantra. After passing through the town of Kilifarevo and the villages of Vaglevtsi and Voneshta Voda, it leaves the valley and ascends the northern slopes of the Balkan Mountains. There, the road passes through the villages of Mishemorkov Han and Lagerite, follows the Pass of the Republic (698 m) and enters Stara Zagora Province. The road then descends along the valley of the Radova reka, a left tributary of the Tundzha, passes through the village of Pchelinovo and west of the town of Gurkovo exits the mountain and enters the Tvarditsa Valley. It goes through the center of Gurkovo, crosses the river Tundzha, passes the village of Panicherevo, bypasses Zhrebchevo Reservoir from the west and south and enters Sliven Province.

In Sliven Province the road crosses the easternmost reaches of the Sredna Gora mountain range and at the village of Asenovets descends to the Nova Zagora field, which is the northeasternmost part of the Upper Thracian Plain. The II-55 goes through the western neighbourhoods of the town of Nova Zagora, then bypasses the southern parts of the town and heads south, passing under the Trakia motorway without forming a junction. It crosses the western low areas of the Svetiiliyski Heights and passes through the villages of Radevo, Mlekarevo, Novoselets and Radetski and just north of the Maritsa Iztok-2 Thermal Power Plant the road reenters Stara Zagora Province. There, it passes through the dam of the Ovcharitsa Reservoir on the homonymous river, reaches the western parts of the Manastirski Heights, runs through the villages of Polski Gradets, Madrets and Glavan, after which it ascends the northern slopes of the small Sakar mountain range and enters Haskovo Province.

Between the villages of Cherepovo and Balgarska Polyana the road begins its descend through the southern slopes of Sakar along the valley of the Golyama reka, a left tributary of the Maritsa. After the villages of Dripchevo and Mladinovo it exits the mountain and enters the wide Maritsa valley. Threre, the II-55 passes through Pastrogor, forms a junction with the Maritsa motorway and in the center of the town of Svilengrad near the borders with Greece and Turkey it reaches its terminus at Km 370.7 of the first class I-8 road.
