= I-5 road (Bulgaria) =

Road in Bulgaria

Republic Road I-5
- Републикански път I-5
- I-5 road highlighted in orange

Route information
- Length: 397.3 km (246.9 mi)

Major junctions
- From: Danube Bridge; (Romania)
- To: Makaza; (Greece)

Location
- Country: Bulgaria
- Major cities: Ruse, Byala, Veliko Tarnovo, Gabrovo, Kazanlak, Stara Zagora, Dimitrovgrad, Haskovo, Kardzhali, Momchilgrad

Highway system
- Highways in Bulgaria

Republic road I-5 (Bulgarian: Републикански път I-5) is a major road in central Bulgaria. It runs between Danube Bridge, at the Danube border with Romania, and the Makaza pass, at the border crossing to Greece. The total length of the road is 397.3 km (246.9 mi). Most of it provides one driving lane per direction. Road I-5 follows European route E85 from Ruse to Haskovo.

== Description ==
Road I-5 begins from Danube Bridge, at the Danube border with Romania. The road bypasses Ruse and runs south. It bypasses Veliko Tarnovo and then turns southwest before reaching Gabrovo. In February 2015, the government announced plans to build Veliko Tarnovo–Ruse motorway, that will supersede I-5.

Currently the road passes through the Balkan Mountains via the Shipka Pass (el. 1,150 m (3,770 ft). To improve the traffic conditions, a 3.2 km tunnel is planned to be built. The construction of the Gabrovo bypass, the first stage of the project, already has begun in 2013. The heavyweight freight traffic uses another road through the Pass of the Republic to cross the mountain.

The road leaves the Balkan Mountains at Shipka and then passes through the centre of Kazanlak. It bypasses Stara Zagora before connecting with Trakia motorway (A1) at Stara Zagora interchange.

South of Dimitrovgrad, road I-5 will make connection with Maritsa motorway (A4), which shall provide fast and comfortable access to Turkey, at Kapitan Andreevo border checkpoint.

A new 24 km section of road I-5 between Kardzhali and the village of Podkova opened to traffic in February 2014, providing safer and faster access to Makaza border crossing to Greece.
