= II-57 road (Bulgaria) =

Road in Bulgaria

Republic Road I-57
- Републикански път I-57

Route information
- Length: 41.5 km (25.8 mi)

Major junctions
- From: Km 236.3 of I-5, Stara Zagora
- To: Km 114.2 of II-55, Novoselets

Location
- Country: Bulgaria
- Towns: Stara Zagora, Radnevo

Highway system
- Highways in Bulgaria

Republican Road II-57 (Bulgarian: Републикански път II-57) is a 2nd class road in Bulgaria, running in general direction northwest–southeast through the territory of Stara Zagora and Sliven Provinces. Its length is 41.5 km.

== Route description ==
The road starts at Km 236.3 of the first class I-5 road in the southeastern reaches of the city of Stara Zagora and heads southeast through the Upper Thracian Plain. It passes through the villages of Mogila and Sarnevo, crosses the river Blatnitsa, a left tributary of the Sazliyka of the Maritsa drainage, and reaches the town of Radnevo. From Radnevo the road continues eastwards, enters Sliven Province, passes through the village of Pet Mogili and in the center of the village of Novoseltsi links with Km 114.2 of the second class II-55 road.
