= Cherno More motorway =

Motorway in Bulgaria

Cherno More motorway
- Автомагистрала „Черно море“
- Cherno More motorway highlighted in red and yellow

Route information
- Length: 10 km (6.2 mi) 103 km (64 mi) planned

Major junctions
- From: Varna
- To: Burgas (planned)

Location
- Country: Bulgaria
- Major cities: Varna, Burgas (planned)

Highway system
- Highways in Bulgaria

The Cherno More motorway or the Black Sea motorway (Bulgarian: Автомагистрала „Черно море“, Avtomagistrala "Cherno more") is a Bulgarian motorway planned to link the major coastal cities of Varna and Burgas, passing along the Bulgarian Black Sea Coast. It is part of the Pan-European Corridor VIII and is estimated to be 103 km (60 miles) long when finished. As of 2016, 10 km (6 miles) of the motorway are completed, from the Asparuhov bridge in Varna to the village of Priseltsi.

The Cherno More motorway is expected to considerably shorten the journey between the two cities, since the traffic is slowed down significantly by the narrow passage of the Balkan Mountains between Nesebar and Obzor, especially during the summer season. As part of the Bulgarian motorway network, the motorway is to be linked with the Hemus motorway (A2) near Varna and with the Trakia motorway (A1) near Burgas, both leading to the capital Sofia.

The motorway is included for financing by the allocated for Bulgaria since 2022 EU funds, like other motorways in the country. In 2011 the National Company "Strategic Infrastructure Projects" was established. One of the main aims of this state-run company is to assess and update all preliminary design works and feasibility studies. In November 2013 the government announced talks to complete the remaining sections of the motorway with a loan from the Chinese Exim bank. The construction works are estimated to cost up to €307m.

The motorway is named after the Black Sea, which translates to "Cherno More" in Bulgarian.

== Exits ==
Exit	km	Destinations	Lanes	Notes
	0	Varna, Asparuhov Bridge		In service
	2.6	Asparuhovo		In service
	10.7	Priseltsi		In service
	10.7 - 103	Priseltsi - Vetren		Planned
	103	, Burgas		Planned
