= Bolyartsi =

Bolyartsi refers to the following places in Bulgaria:

- Bolyartsi, Kardzhali Province
- Bolyartsi, Varna Province
