= Zdravets, Varna Province =

Zdravets Здравец
- Village
- Location within Bulgaria
- Coordinates: 43°7′N 27°45′E
- Country: Bulgaria
- Province: Varna Province
- Municipality: Avren

Area
  - Total: 24.947 km^{2} (9.632 sq mi)

Population (2007)
  - Total: 326
- Time zone: UTC+2 (EET)
  - Summer (DST): UTC+3 (EEST)

Zdravets (Bulgarian: Здравец) is a village in the municipality of Avren, in Varna Province, northeastern Bulgaria. The village lies 10 kilometres east of Avren, south of Beloslav and Beloslav Lake and northwest of Benkovski and Priseltsi. The village covers an area of 24.947 km^{2} and according to the 2007 census had a population of 326 inhabitants.
