= Rila motorway =

Road in Bulgaria

Route information
- Length: 170 km (110 mi) Planned: 170 kilometres (110 mi)

Major junctions
- From: Gyueshevo
- To: Ihtiman, Trakia motorway, Potop, Hemus motorway

Location
- Country: Bulgaria
- Major cities: Kyustendil, Dupnitsa, Samokov and Ihtiman

Highway system
- Highways in Bulgaria

The Rila motorway, still undesignated, is a planned motorway in southern Bulgaria.

It will start from the Gyueshevo border crossing with North Macedonia and end with connection to the Trakia motorway (A1) near Ihtiman. It will pass near the cities of Kyustendil, Dupnitsa (Struma motorway (A3)) and Samokov.

The motorway will duplicate the national road I-6 to Kyustendil and II-62 to Samokov and along it will pass the European road E871 to Kyustendil. It will be a part of the Pan-European Transport Corridor 8.

The total planned length of the Rila motorway is about 170 km, with 0 km completed as of 2025.

== Name ==
The motorway is named after the Rila mountain which is nearby the main route.

== Exits ==
Exit	km	Destinations	Lanes	Notes
	0	Gyueshevo border pass; North Macedonia, Kumanovo,		Planned
	62	Sofia, Dupnitsa, Kulata, Greece,		Planned
	170	Ihtiman,		Planned
