= Abdülkerim Nadir Pasha =

Ottoman army general (1807–1883)

AbdülKerim Nadir Pasha
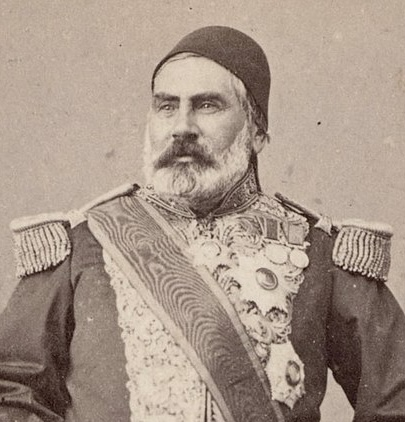
- Born: AbdülKerim Nadir; 1807; Chirpan, Rumelia Eyalet, Ottoman Empire
- Died: 1883 (aged 75–76); Sanjak of Rhodes, Vilayet of the Archipelago, Ottoman Empire
- Military career
- Allegiance: Ottoman Empire
- Branch: Ottoman Army
- Rank: General
- Conflicts: Crimean War; Russo-Turkish War (1877–78)

Abdülkerim Nâdir Pasha (1807–1883), also known as Çırpanlı Abdi Pasha or Abdul Kerim Pasha, son of Ahmed Pasha, was an Ottoman military commander.

== Early years ==
Abdülkerim Nadir was born in Çırpan of Eski Zağra, Ottoman Bulgaria in 1807. At a young age, he moved to Constantinople (today Istanbul), and entered the newly established military academy (Ottoman Turkish: Asâkir-i Mansûre-i Muhammediyye), and graduated in the rank of a first lieutenant. After the establishment of the Imperial Army War Academy, he was assigned as an officer to the school battalion. For further military education, he was sent to Vienna, Austrian Empire in 1836.

== Career ==
After five years in Vienna, he returned home in 1841, and was appointed Chief of the General Staff in the rank of a colonel. With the support of the notables of the Tanzimat period, he rose in ranks in a short time. In 1846, he was promoted to the rank of a lieutenant general, and appointe as a member of the Military Council (Ottoman Turkish: Dâr-ı Şûrâ-yı Askerî) and Chief of the Military School (Ottoman Turkish: Mekâtib-i Askeriyye).

The next year, he was promoted to the rank of a marshal, and was appointedd to the Sixth Army headquartered in Baghdad, Ottoman Iraq. During the reign of Sultan Abdulaziz (r. 1861–1876), he served as army commander, governor, Chief of the General Staff, Minister of Navy and supreme commander.

During the Russo-Turkish War (1877–1878), which broke out in the early years of the reign of Abdul Hamid II (r. 1876–1909), he became commander of the Rumelian army. He was not able to show success in the war, and could not prevent the Russian forces spreading to the Balkans. He was removed from his post by the sultan, and sent to the martial court together with another army commander. He was reinstated to his post When it was understood at the end of the trial that he was not solely responsible for the Russian defeat, and that the military council in Istanbul also had a share in this. But, ne was sent to exile on Mytilene. Later, he was transferrred to Rhodes, where he died in 1883. He was buried in the tomb of Murad Reis there.

== Legacy ==
Due to his close relationship with Hüseyin Avni Pasha (182–1876), his name is also mentioned among those who are claimed to have played a role in the death of Sultan Abdulaziz. Although he was an honest and brave soldier, Abdülkerim Nadir Pasha could not show the success expected of him, but on the other hand, together with Mehmed Namık Pasha (1804–1892), he made important contributions in the organization of the army in a European style.
