= Asparuhov Bridge =

Asparuhov Bridge Аспарухов мост
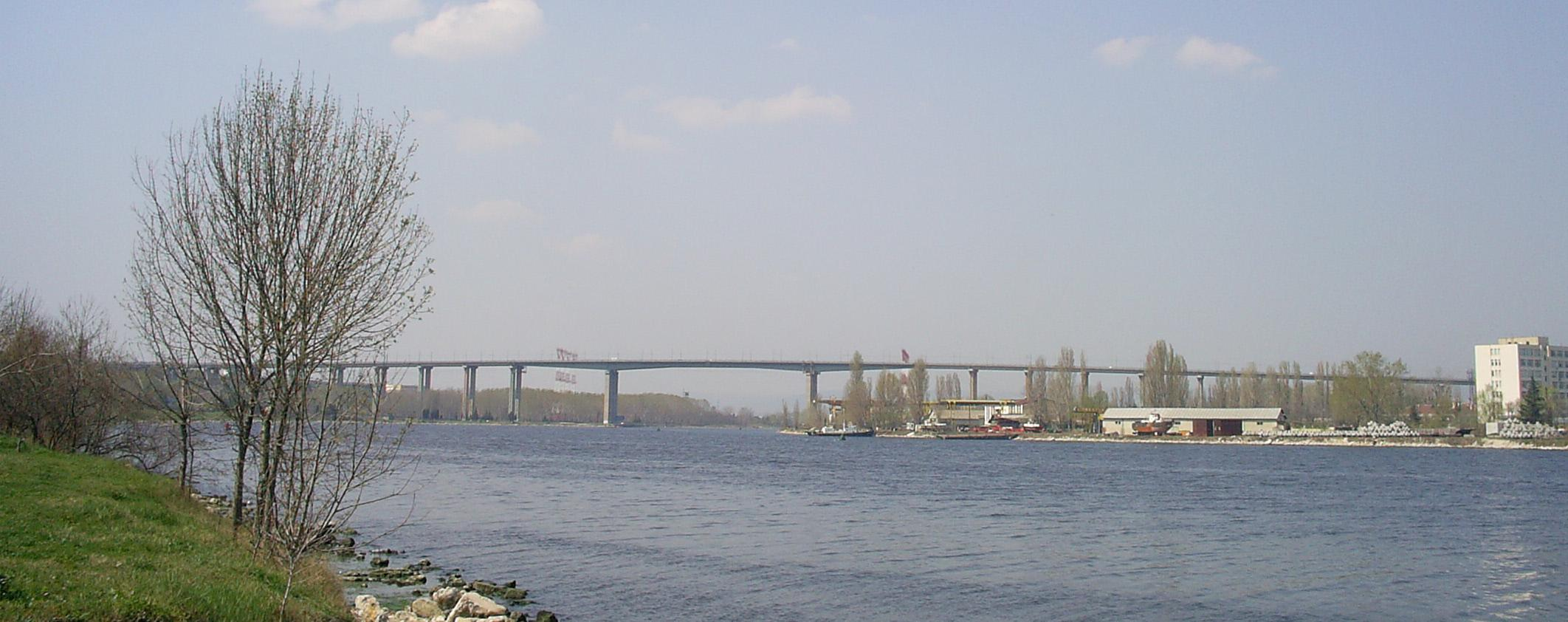
- Coordinates: 43°11′25″N 27°53′05″E
- Carries: cars: four lanes of the Cherno More motorway
- Crosses: canal between Lake Varna and the Black Sea
- Locale: Varna, Bulgaria

Characteristics
- Design: continuous beam
- Total length: 2,050 m
- Width: 21 m (two carriageways, each with two lanes 7.9 m each; two former sidewalks 1.9 m each and curbs)
- Longest span: 160 m
- Clearance below: 46 m

History
- Opened: 8 September 1976

Location
- Interactive map of Asparuhov Bridge; Аспарухов мост

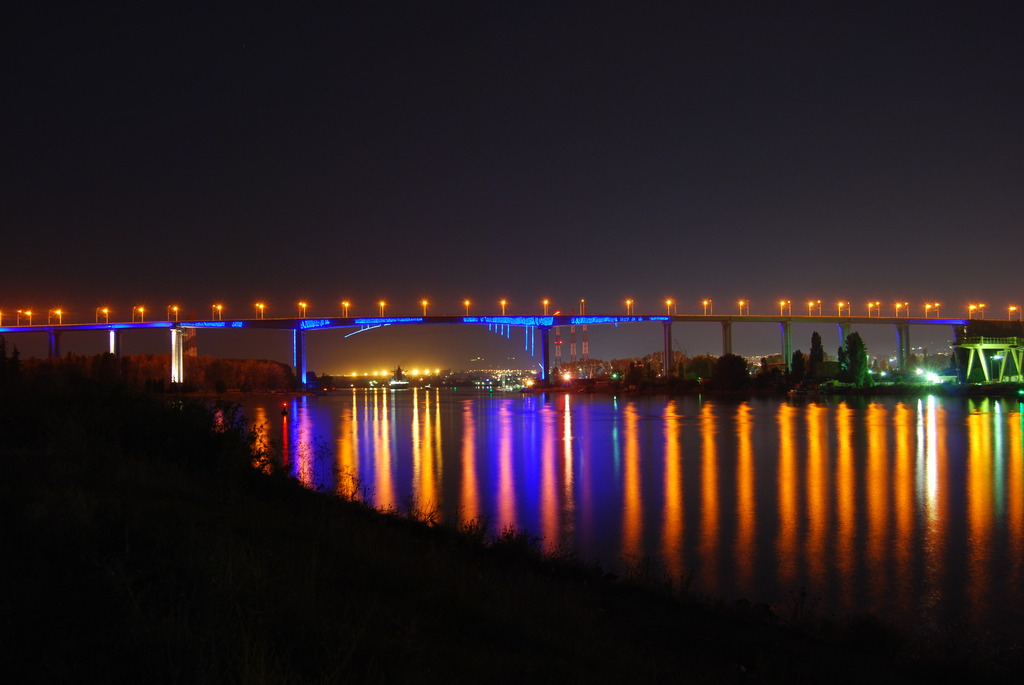
Asparuhov most at night

The Asparuhov most (Bulgarian: Аспарухов мост) or Asparuhov Bridge is a bridge in Varna on the Black Sea coast of Bulgaria. It connects the Asparuhovo district to the rest of the city over the canals between the Black Sea and Lake Varna.

The bridge is 2.05 km in length and 50 m in height, weighing 3,200 tons. It has 38 pairs of supports, each one capable of carrying 2,400 tons. The bridge experiences significant traffic, with 10,000 vehicles crossing it every day.

The bridge's construction began in 1973 when the need for a larger canal to link Lake Varna and the sea became necessary. The initial launch date was set for 30 September 1976, but construction was ahead of schedule and finished on 8 September, when the bridge was opened in a ceremony by Todor Zhivkov. Meanwhile, the new canal that the bridge crosses began operation on 1 September, with the first ship going through on 4 September of the same year.

After 20 years of neglect, reconstruction work began in 1996 with a planned completion in October 1998, but the installation was not reopened until 17 September 1999, long overdue from the initial plans of a 16-month reconstruction.

Today, the Asparuhov Most is not only an important transport installation, but also a place where extreme sports fans meet, as the bridge is a favourable location for bungee jumping. The bridge is also unfortunately a suicide bridge, with many deaths occurring over the past decades.

In September 2015, the municipality of Varna announced plans to fully renovate the bridge and add cycle tracks. Nothing happened until 2025, but a speed limit of 50 kmph and a weight limit of 12 tons was introduced because of the bad condition of the load-bearing structures.
