= National Company "Strategic Infrastructure Projects" =

The National Company Strategic Infrastructure Projects (NCSIP) was a parallel road agency in Bulgaria during the 2011 - 2016 period. NCSIP was created with the amendments in the Bulgarian Roads Act in 2011. The company was a state enterprise subordinate to the Minister of Regional Development and Public Works. NCSIP became a beneficiary under OP Transport with the decisions of the Monitoring Committee from December 2011. In accordance with the Roads Act, NCSIP was responsible for the preparation and implementation of tender procedure for construction of Struma motorway, Hemus motorway and Cherno More motorway.

In April 2016, NCSIP was closed, with its assets being merged into the Road Infrastructure Agency.
