= Georgi Danchov =

Bulgarian artist, photographer and revolutionary

Georgi Danchov Георги Данчов
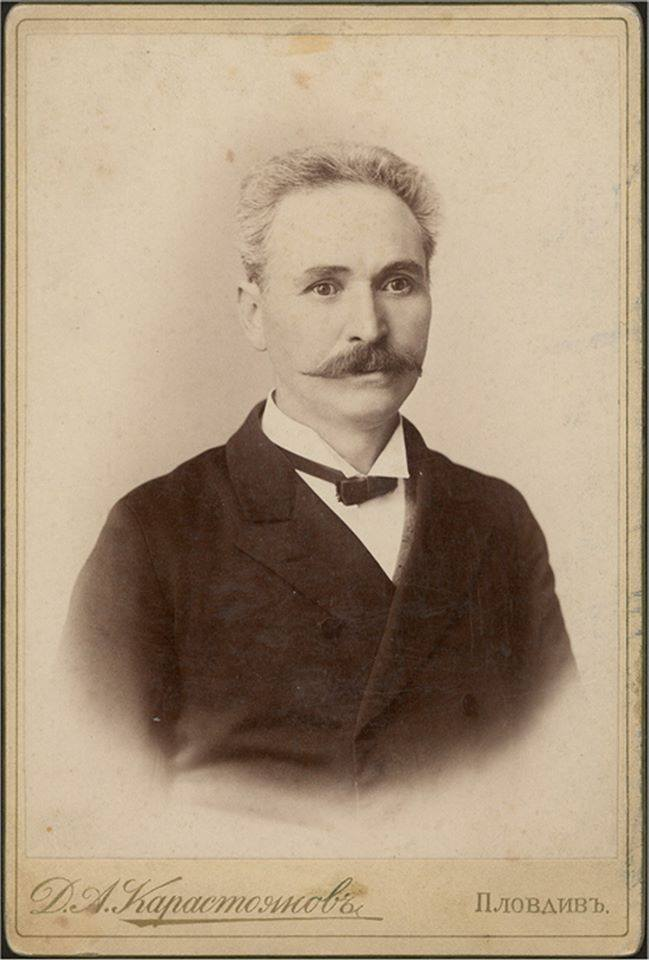
- Born: July 27, 1846; Chirpan, Ottoman Empire
- Died: January 19, 1908 (aged 61); Sofia
- Occupation: Artist

Georgi Danchov (Bulgarian: Георги Данчов) (1846–1908) was a Bulgarian Renaissance artist, photographer, illustrator, cartoonist, comics artist, caricaturist and a revolutionary.

He was one of the closest associates of Vasil Levski and the author considered the most accurate portrait of the Apostle. Georgi Danchov, father of Nicholas and Ivan Danchov, was one of the compilers of the first Bulgarian encyclopedias and numerous dictionaries.

On May 24, 1869 Levski visited Chirpan where he stayed at the home of Georgi Danchov and the local Secret Committee based there. During the revolutionary movement, he (also known as Zografina) was exiled in Diyarbakir with a life sentence, but fled to Russia in 1876 and even during his exile artistic enthusiasm keep the pressure – there lithography creates "Mermaids". During the Russo-Turkish War, taking part in the Bulgarian volunteers, and after the liberation – in Rumelian coup. Danchov was a public figure: a member of the interim government in Plovdiv, and repeatedly elected to Parliament. In 1879, Plovdiv he created his legendary work – lithography entitled "Free Bulgaria".

Georgi Danchov painted icons for churches in Plovdiv, Chirpan, Stara Zagora, Kazanlak. In 1861 izografisva altar apse of the Arapovo monastery St. Nedelja (also called Zlatovrahski monastery) and the vault of the monastery church of St. Spas "near Sopot. In 1865 he went to Constantinople, where he studied lithography. His first lithographic works are portraits of Medhat Pasha and composition Raina Princess in the cave. In 1867, on behalf of Nayden Gerov create 17 themed pictures with images of Bulgarian costumes and domestic scenes, presented an exhibition in Moscow University. Besides Levski, painted portraits and other Bulgarian revolutionaries and public figures: Hristo Botev, Georgi Rakovski, Zahari Stoyanov, Stefan Stambolov. Danchov is one of the founders of Bulgarian secular painting and one of the first photographers in Bulgaria. He is also considered to be the first Bulgarian comics artist, as he created caricatures and cartoons with sequences for 19th-century magazines. In 1890 he created a text comic named The Six Feelings.

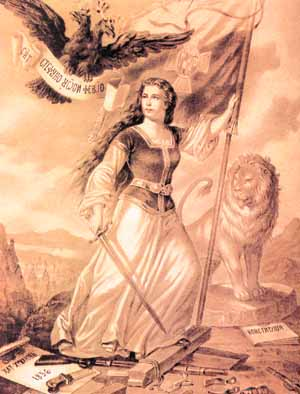
Georgi Danchov, "Free Bulgaria", lithography
