= Highways in Bulgaria =

Motorway sign from Bulgaria

Highways in Bulgaria are dual carriageways, grade separated with controlled-access, designed for high speeds. In 2012, legislation amendments defined two types of highways: motorways (Bulgarian: Aвтомагистрала, Avtomagistrala) and expressways (Bulgarian: Скоростен път, Skorosten pat). The main differences are that motorways have an alternative route and the maximum allowed speed limit is 140 km/h (87 mph), while expressways do not and the speed limit is 120 km/h (75 mph). As of November 2025, a total of 911 kilometers of motorways are in service.

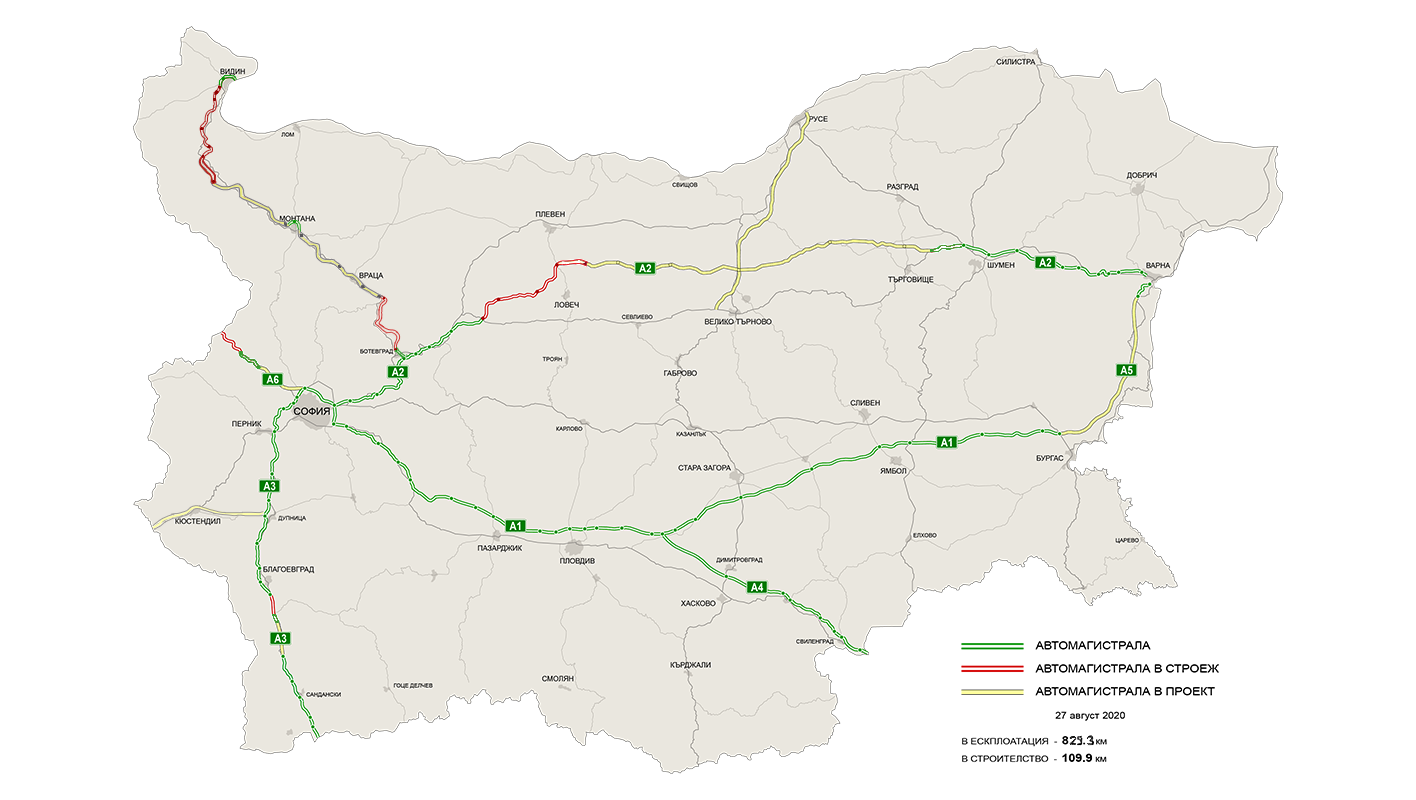
Bulgaria Infrastructure Situation March 2023

Generally, there are no toll roads in Bulgaria, and instead a vignette is required, except for municipal roads. Two bridges − New Europe Bridge and Danube Bridge are tolled, both at Danube border crossings to Romania. However, introduction of toll system to replace the vignettes is under way as being a more fair form of payment. In April 2016 the road agency launched a tender for implementation of an electronic toll collection system for vehicles heavier than 3.5 tonnes and the contract was signed in January 2018. Since January 2019, the electronic vignette is in charge instead of the sticker. Later, a toll system for vehicles over 3,5 tons got introduced.

== Network map ==
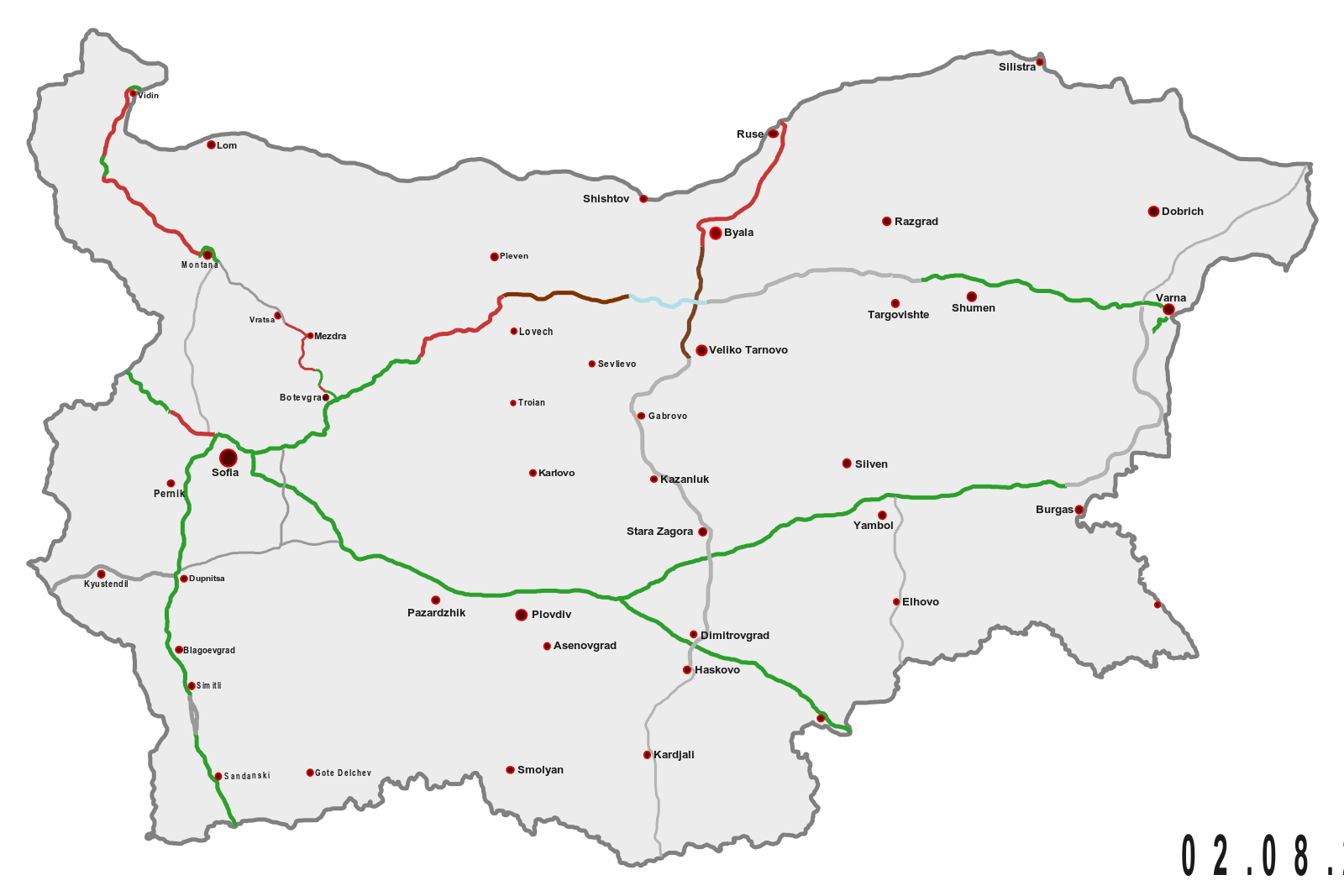
The current situation of motorways and expressways in Bulgaria Completed Under construction Tendered Environmental permit issued Planned

All highways in Bulgaria, including planned and under construction

== History ==
Motorways construction timeline between 1995 and 2015

The initial plan for construction of motorways dates back to 1973, when the government of Socialist Bulgaria approved a resolution to build a motorway ring, encompassing the country and consisting of three motorways – Trakia, Hemus and Cherno More. By the democratic changes in 1990, a total of 273 km of motorways had been built in Bulgaria. By 2007, the year of accession to the EU, this had increased to approximately 420 km with predominantly state funding. The EU accession of the country in 2007, and the in recent years improved utilization of the allocated EU funds enabled Bulgaria to speed up the expansion of its highway network. As of December 2018, 800 km (497 mi) of motorways are in service, with another 38 km (24 mi) being under various stages of construction.

The first fully completed motorway was Lyulin motorway, then designated A6, a short 19 km stretch connecting Sofia with Pernik and further merging with Struma motorway (A3) that continues to Greece at Kulata border crossing, opened in 2011. However, in 2018, the government decided to merge Lyulin motorway into Struma motorway as both are forming an interrupted route from Sofia to Greece.

After 40 years of construction, the first large motorway, spanning 360 km, Trakia (A1) was inaugurated on 15 July 2013, thus connecting the capital Sofia and Burgas, at the Black Sea coast. Two years later, on 29 October 2015, the last remaining section of Maritsa motorway (A4), branching off from A1 nearby Chirpan and connecting with the border of Turkey at Kapitan Andreevo checkpoint, entered in service. Sofia Northern Bypass motorway, an important thoroughfare north of Sofia, was inaugurated in 2015.

== List of highways ==
=== Motorways ===
Motorway	From	Route	To	Planned	In service	%	Under construction	Tender	Notes
Trakia	Sofia, Sofia Ring Road;,,	Ihtiman, Pazardzhik, Plovdiv, Chirpan;, Stara Zagora, Sliven, Yambol	Burgas	360 km	360 km	100%	−	−	Completed on 15 July 2013
Hemus	Sofia, Sofia Ring Road;,,	Botevgrad, Pleven, Lovech, Veliko Tarnovo, Targovishte, Shumen	Varna	418 km	206 km	49.28%	99 km	33 km	Estimated completion by 2030
Struma	Sofia, Sofia Ring Road;,,	Pernik, Dupnitsa, Blagoevgrad, Sandanski	Kulata; (Greece)	172 km	143 km	83,14%	4 km	−	Estimated completion by 2030
Maritsa	Chirpan,	Haskovo/Dimitrovgrad	Kapitan Andreevo; (Turkey)	117 km	117 km	100%	−	−	Completed on 29 October 2015
Cherno More	Varna	Nesebar	Burgas,	103 km	8 km	7.77%	−	−	Estimated completion by 2032
Europe	Kalotina; (Serbia)	Dragoman, Slivnitsa, Kostinbrod	Sofia;, Sofia Ring Road;,	63 km	63 km	100%	−	−	Completed on 14 September 2025
Vidin-Montana (Note: Still not designated.)	Vidin, New Europe Bridge; (Romania)	Dunavtsi, Dimovo, Ruzhintsi	Montana	95 km	14 km	14,7%	81 km	−	Estimated completion by 2030
Veliko Tarnovo–Ruse	Ruse, Danube Bridge; (Romania) towards Bucharest	Byala	Veliko Tarnovo	133 km	0 km	0%	75 km	57 km	Estimated completion by 2030
Rila	Ihtiman,	Samokov, Dupnitsa;, Kyustendil	Gyueshevo; (North Macedonia) towards Skopje	170 km	0 km	0%	−	−	Estimated completion after 2030
Total				1661 km	911 km	54.85%	259 km	90 km	

=== Expressways ===
Expressway	From	Route	To	Planned	In service	%	Under construction	Tender	Estimated completion
Montana-Botevgrad expressway	Montana	Vratsa, Lyutidol, Skravena	Botevgrad	72 km	12 km	16,6%	37 km	−	2030
Shumen-Ruse	Shumen,	Razgrad	Ruse, Danube Bridge; (Romania)	110 km	−	−	−	−	−
Montana-Sofia	Montana	Barzia, Kostinbrod	Sofia	82 km					
Total				231 km	12 km	5,53%	37 km		

== Other highway projects ==
In 2012, the Bulgarian government announced talks with Qatar to build a South–North motorway/expressway as a PPP from Svilengrad (by the border between Turkey and Greece ) to Ruse, at the Romanian border. The route is part of the Pan-European Corridor IX. In October 2012, a tender for a feasibility study was announced.

== Future openings ==
2026:

- Botevgrad – Mezdra - section 1 between Botevgrad and Skravena (2 km)
- Botevgrad – Mezdra - section 3 between Novachene and Lyutidol (13 km)
- Hemus motorway - section 3.2 between road LOV1054 and Pleven/Lovech (7 km)

2027:

- Hemus motorway - section 4 between Pleven/Lovech and Letnitsa (28 km)
- Struma motorway - section 3.2.2 - Kresna bypass (4 km)
- Vidin – Montana motorway - section 1 between Vidin and Makresh (30 km)
- Vidin – Montana motorway - section 3 between Bela and Ruzhintsi (11 km)

2028:

- Hemus motorway - section 2 between Dermantsi and Kalenik (19 km)
- Hemus motorway - section 5 between Letnitsa and Butovo (23 km)
- Vidin – Montana motorway - section 4 between Ruzhintsi and Belotintsi (15 km)
- Vidin – Montana motorway - section 5 between Belotintsi and Vinishte (12 km)
- Vidin – Montana motorway - section 6 between Vinishte and Montana (14 km)
- Ruse - Veliko Tarnovo motorway - section 2 - Byala bypass (35 km)

2029:

- Hemus motorway - section 3.1 between Kalenik and road LOV1054 (10 km)
- Hemus motorway - section 9 between Loznitsa and Buhovtsi (12 km)

== Access to highway networks of neighbouring countries ==
=== Greece ===
Struma motorway connects near Kulata with the Greek A25 motorway. The route is part of the Pan-European Corridor IV.

Also an intersection on the Maritsa motorway is built near Svilengrad, to connect with the EO51 road in Greece.

=== Romania ===
Botevgrad–Vidin, Veliko Tarnovo–Ruse and Shumen–Ruse expressways, all branching off from Hemus motorway are planned to connect with Romania. The Botevgrad-Vidin expressway is likely the first to be built.

Also, in long terms, Cherno More motorway is planned to connect with the future Romanian A4 motorway to Constanța (interchange with A2 motorway, leading to Bucharest).

=== Turkey ===
Maritsa motorway (A4) connects near Kapitan Andreevo with the Turkish O-3 motorway, heading to Istanbul.

=== Serbia ===
Europe motorway (A6) connects with the Serbian A4 motorway to Niš. The route is part of Pan-European Corridor X.

=== North Macedonia ===
Dupnitsa-Kyustendil expressway branching off from Struma motorway is planned to connect with North Macedonia.

== Gallery ==
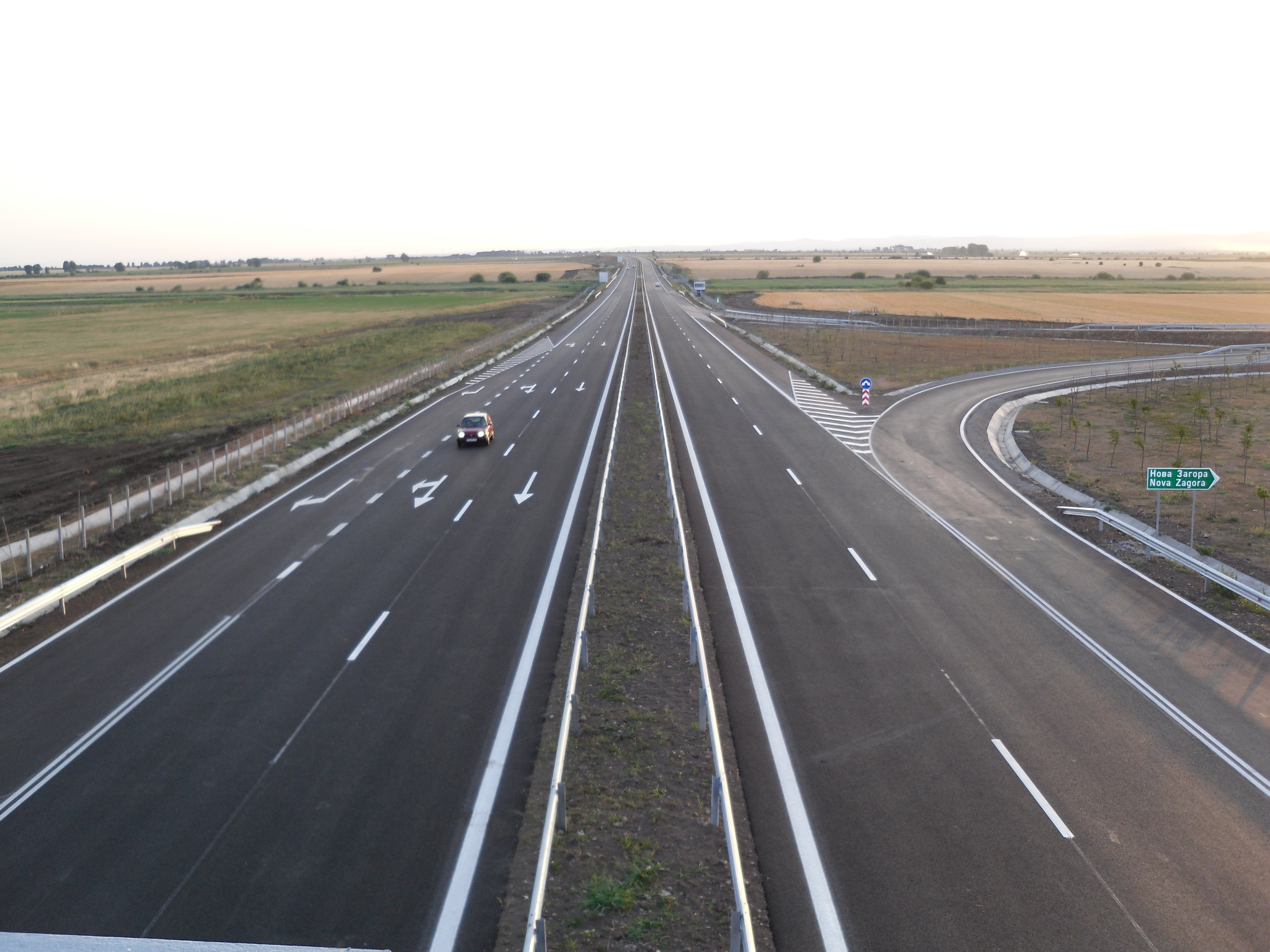
Trakia motorway near Nova Zagora

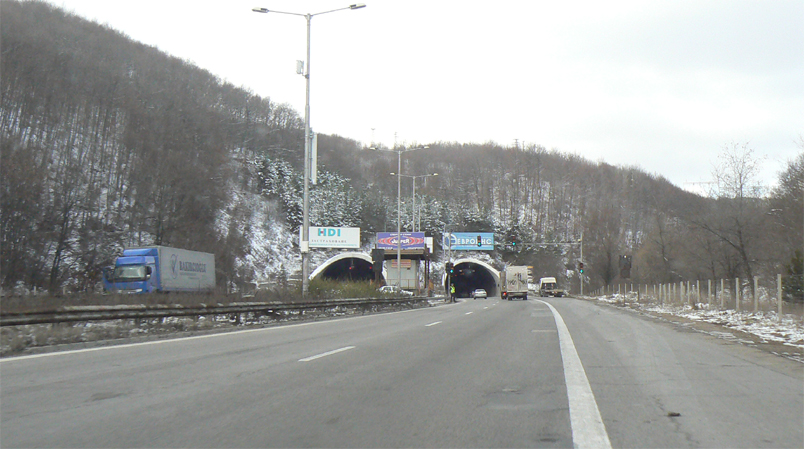
Trakia motorway near Trayanovi Vrata tunnel

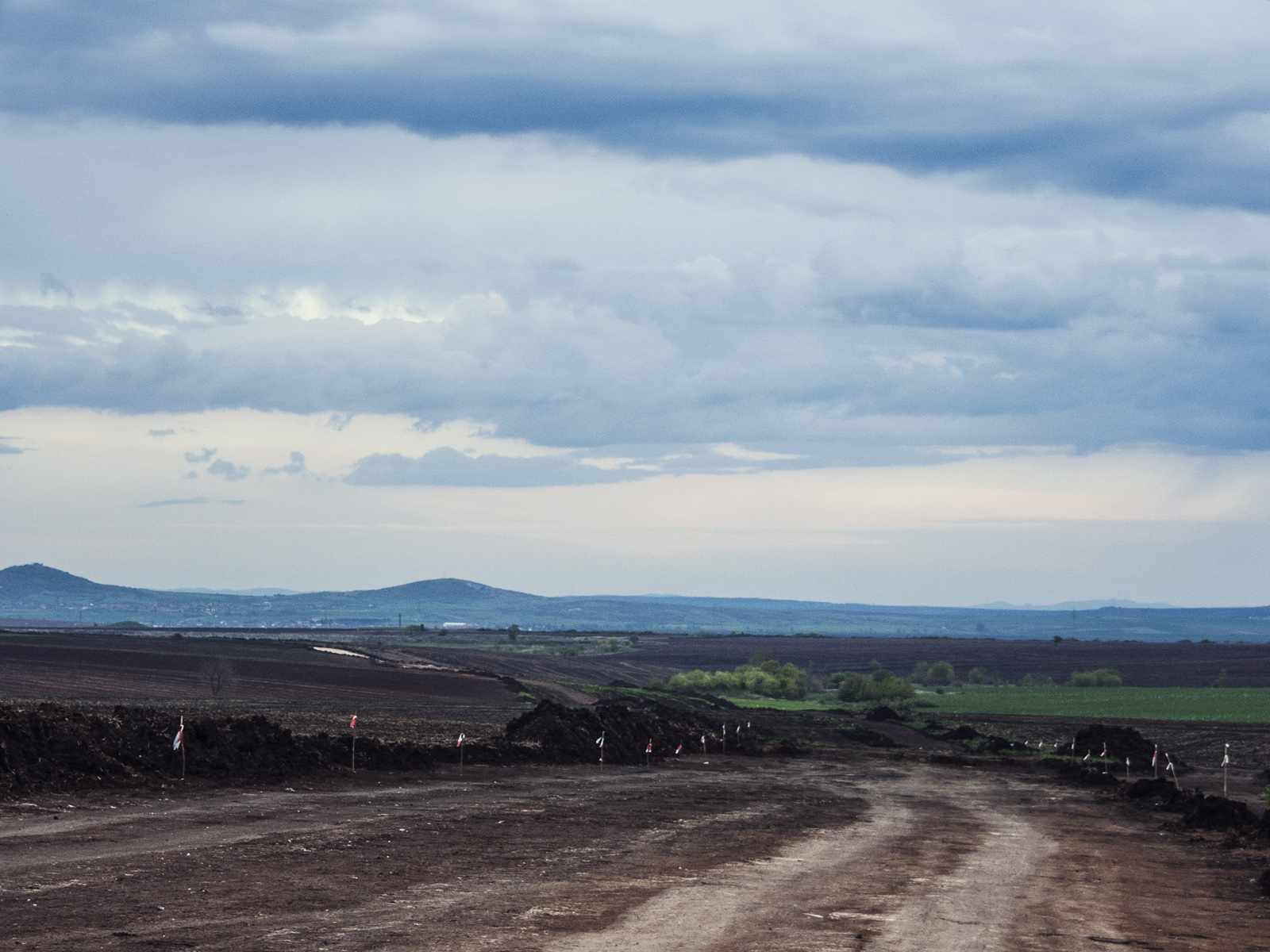
Construction works on Maritsa motorway near Chirpan

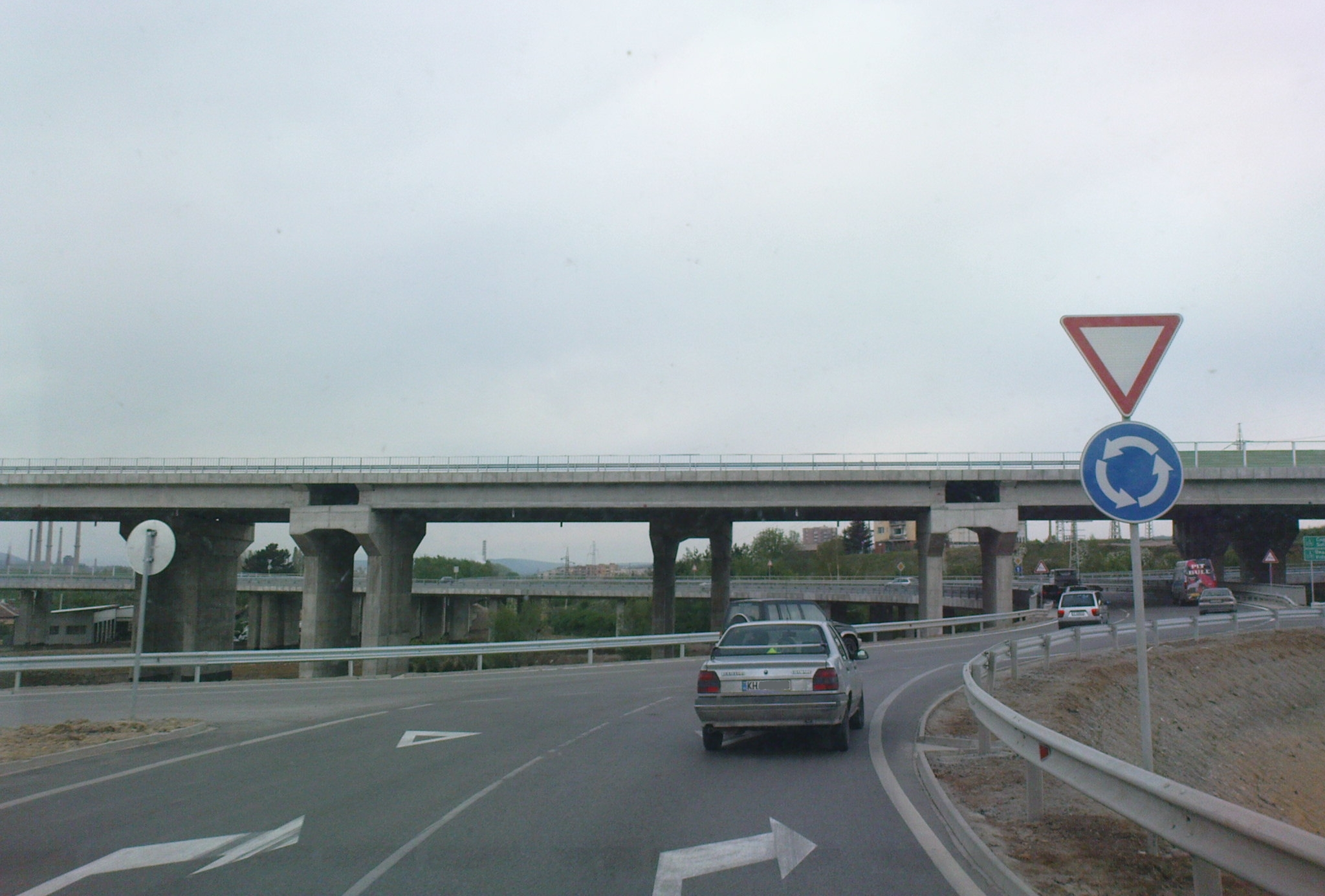
Entering Struma motorway near Pernik

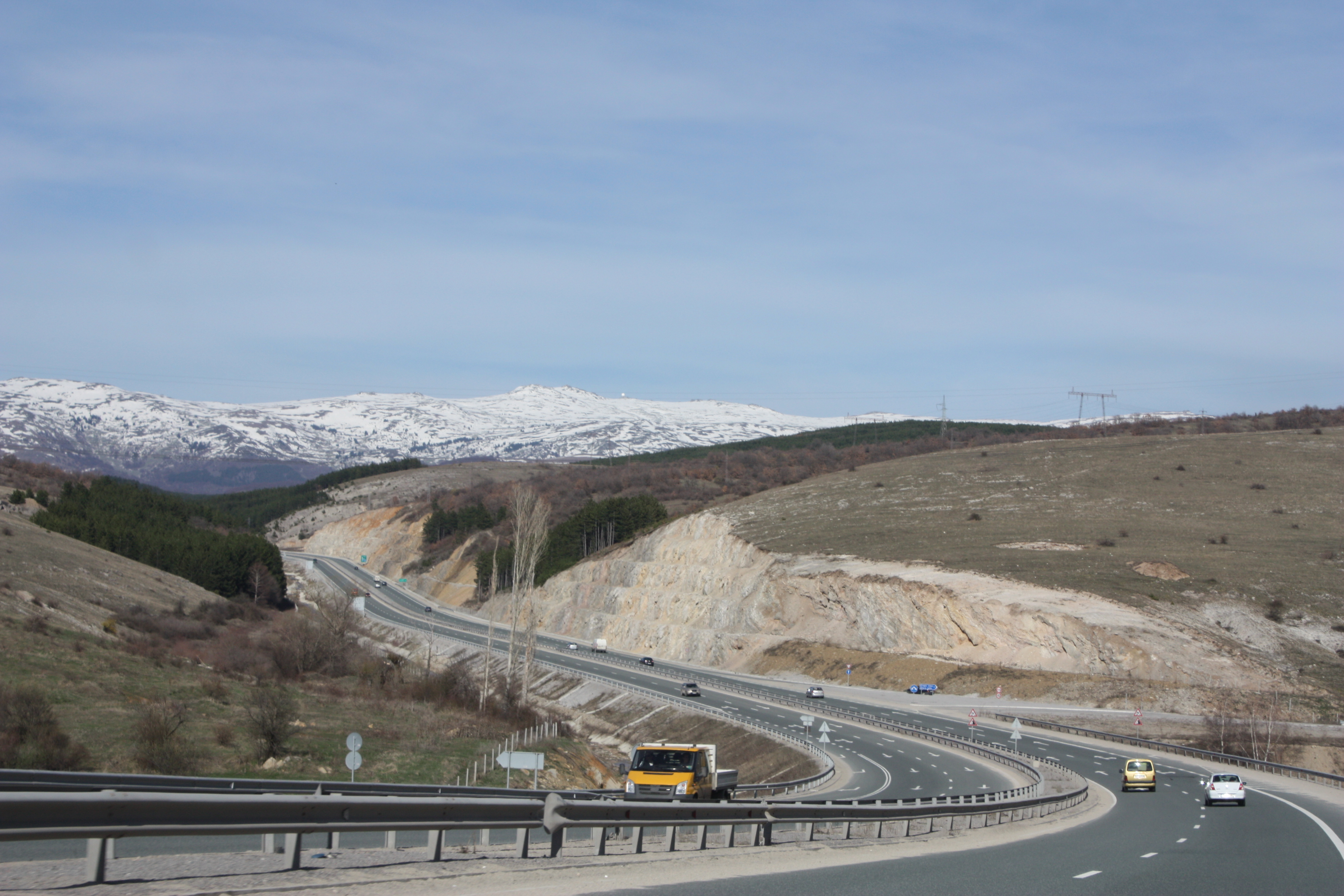
Struma motorway near Pernik

== See also ==
- Transport in Bulgaria
- List of bridges in Bulgaria
- List of controlled-access highway systems
- Evolution of motorway construction in European nations
- List of railway lines in Bulgaria
