= Avren Municipality =

Avren Municipality Община Аврен
- Municipality
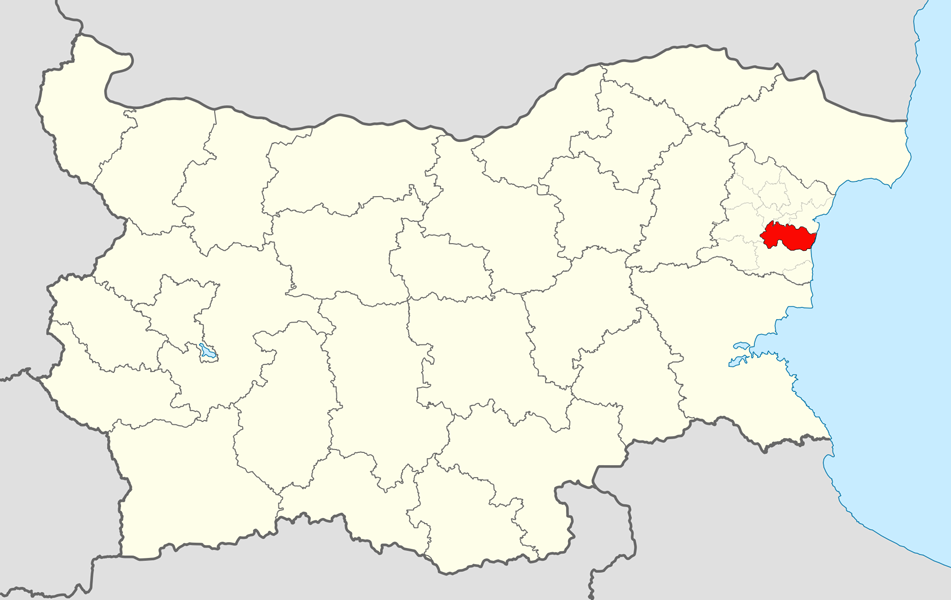
- Avren Municipality within Bulgaria and Varna Province.
- Coordinates: 43°5′N 27°44′E
- Country: Bulgaria
- Province (Oblast): Varna
- Admin. centre (Obshtinski tsentar): Avren

Government
  - Mayor: Emanuil Manolov

Area
  - Total: 380 km^{2} (150 sq mi)

Population (December 2009)
  - Total: 9,089
  - Density: 24/km^{2} (62/sq mi)
- Time zone: UTC+2 (EET)
  - Summer (DST): UTC+3 (EEST)

Avren Municipality (Bulgarian: Община Аврен) is a seaside municipality (obshtina) in Varna Province, Northeastern Bulgaria. It is named after its administrative centre – the village of Avren.

Its area spreads from Provadiya Municipality in the west to the Bulgarian Black Sea Coast in the east. To the south the municipality is mostly defined by the Kamchiya river and its estuary. It embraces a territory of 380 km^{2} (150 sq mi) with a population, as of December 2009, of 9,089 inhabitants.

== Settlements ==
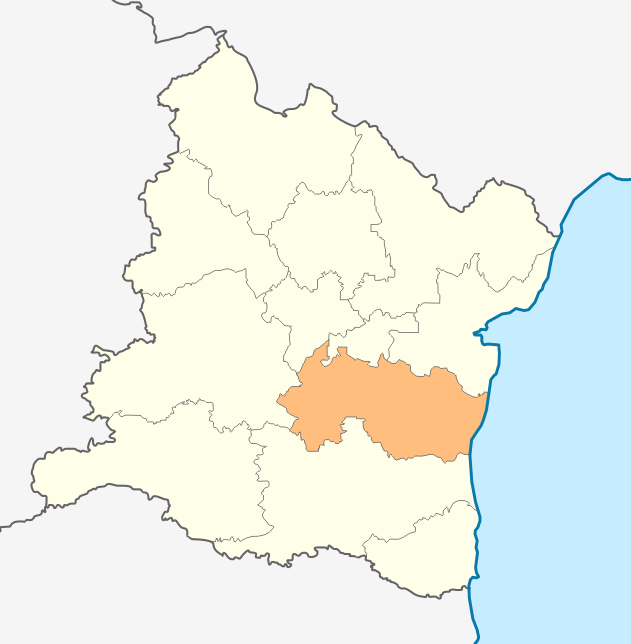
Avren Municipality within Varna Province

Avren Municipality includes the following 17 places, all of them are villages:

Town/Village	Cyrillic	Population (December 2009)
Avren	Аврен	750
Benkovski	Бенковски	445
Bliznatsi	Близнаци	842
Bolyartsi	Болярци	192
Dobri Dol	Добри дол	34
Dabravino	Дъбравино	1,460
Kazashka Reka	Казашка река	326
Kitka	Китка	247
Krusha	Круша	113
Priseltsi	Приселци	849
Ravna Gora	Равна гора	236
Sadovo	Садово	351
Sindel	Синдел	1,259
Tsarevtsi	Царевци	841
Trastikovo	Тръстиково	657
Yunak	Юнак	145
Zdravets	Здравец	342
Total		9,089

== Demography ==
The following table shows the change of the population during the last four decades.

Avren Municipality
Year	1975	1985	1992	2001	2005	2007	2009	2011
Population	12,054	9,676	8,817	8,714	9,074	9,064	9,089	...
Sources: Census 2001, Census 2011, „pop-stat.mashke.org“,

=== Religion ===
According to the latest Bulgarian census of 2011, the religious composition, among those who answered the optional question on religious identification, was the following:

Religious composition of Avren Municipality
Orthodox Christianity	62.3%
Catholicism	0.4%
Protestantism	0.6%
Islam	16.6%
No religion	6.6%
Prefer not to answer, others and indefinable	13.5%

A majority of the population of Avren Municipality identify themselves as Christians. At the 2011 census, 62.3% of respondents identified as Orthodox Christians belonging to the Bulgarian Orthodox Church. There is a relatively large Muslim minority and a large part did not answer.

== See also ==
- Provinces of Bulgaria
- Municipalities of Bulgaria
- List of cities and towns in Bulgaria
