= Sofia Ring Road =

Road in Bulgaria

Sofia Ring Road
- Софийски околовръстен път
- Sofia Ring Road highlighted in red

Route information
- Length: 61.8 km (38.4 mi)

Major junctions
- Beltway around Sofia

Location
- Country: Bulgaria

Highway system
- Highways in Bulgaria

The Sofia ring road (Bulgarian: Софийски околовръстен път, romanized: Sofiyski okolovrasten pat), also called in Bulgarian Okolovrastnoto shose (Cyrillic: Околовръстното шосе, The ring chaussée), often shortened to just Okolovrastnoto (Cyrillic: Околовръстното, literally The ring [chaussée]) is an important thoroughfare surrounding Sofia, the capital of Bulgaria. The ring road is 61.8 km long and has recently been upgraded on several sections, with plans to further improve it on the remaining sections.

== Sections ==
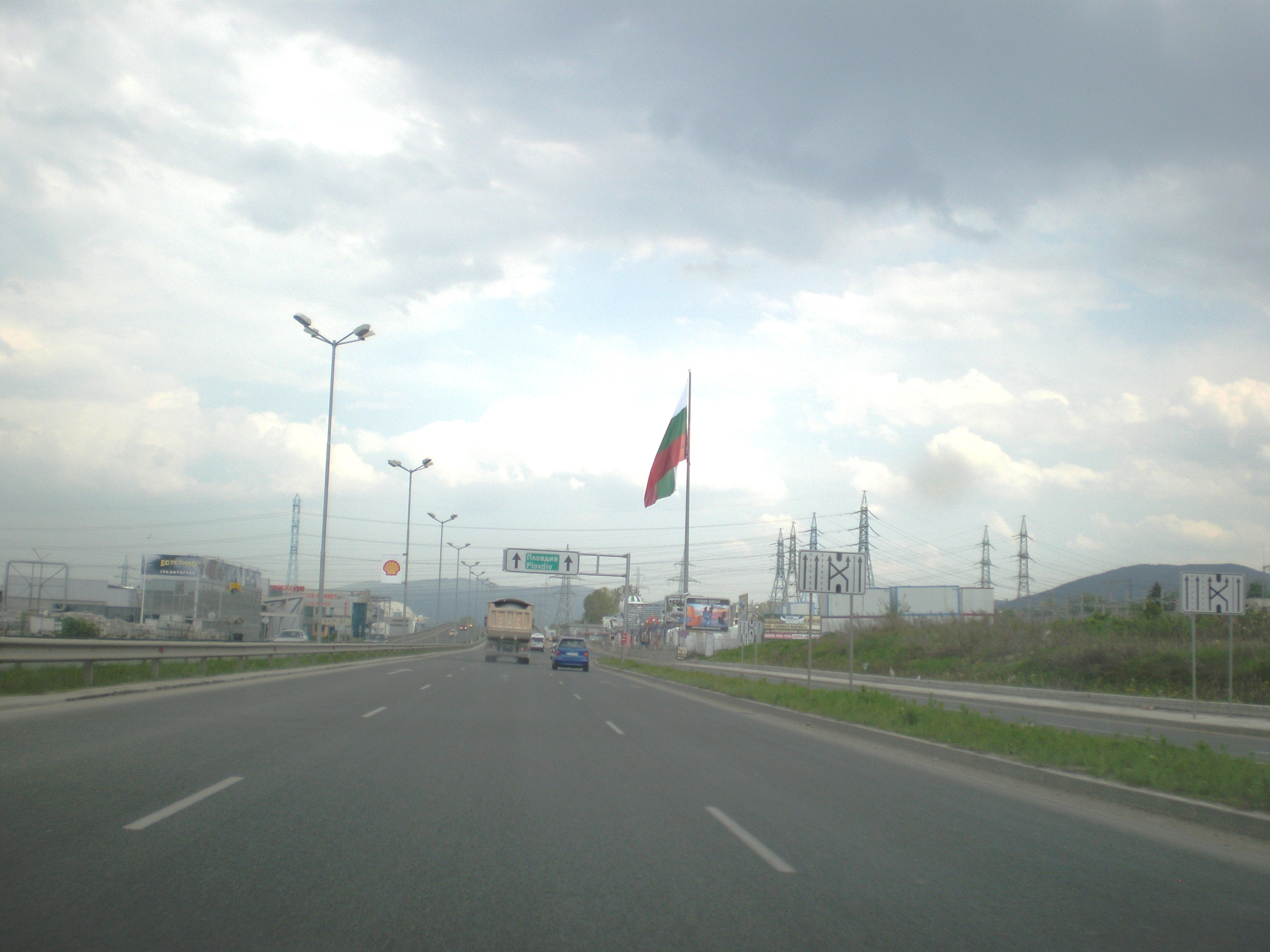
Upgraded section of the southern arc of Sofia ring road

The Sofia ring road is divided into four sections (arcs), at south, north, west and east. A major part of southern arc has been significantly upgraded in several stages between 2007 and 2012, providing now a conflict-free connection between the Boyana and the Mladost IV junctions. The next planned upgrade on the southern section will be between the Buxton district and the Lyulin motorway (A6), which may begin after 2013. The segment between Mladost and Tsarigradsko shose blvd / Trakia motorway (A1) interchange has conceptual design since 2015, with a proposal to be upgraded with an EIB loan.

The eastern arc, which lies between the Trakia motorway (A1) and the Hemus motorway (A2), is grade-separated and provides three traffic lanes and a hard shoulder in each direction. Though, it's not signed as a motorway and a 90 km/h (56 mph) speed limit applies.

In the northern part of city, the Northern Speed Tangent connects the Mramor village with the Hemus motorway. It is a controlled-access highway, designed to carry the transit traffic and supersedes the existing northern arc. It was tendered in 2012, the construction works began in 2015. and it was inaugurated in April 2016.

The western arc is completely upgraded to a grade-separated status, between the Lyulin motorway (A6) and the Northern Speed Tangent. The first section, between the Lyulin motorway and the Kakach river, was constructed between 2012 and 2015. The second section, between the Kakach river and the Northern Speed Tangent, was tendered in 2013 but the tender later failed. A second tender was announced in 2014 and the construction began in October 2015. It was inaugurated on 13 September 2016.

== See also ==
- Northern Speed Tangent

== Gallery ==
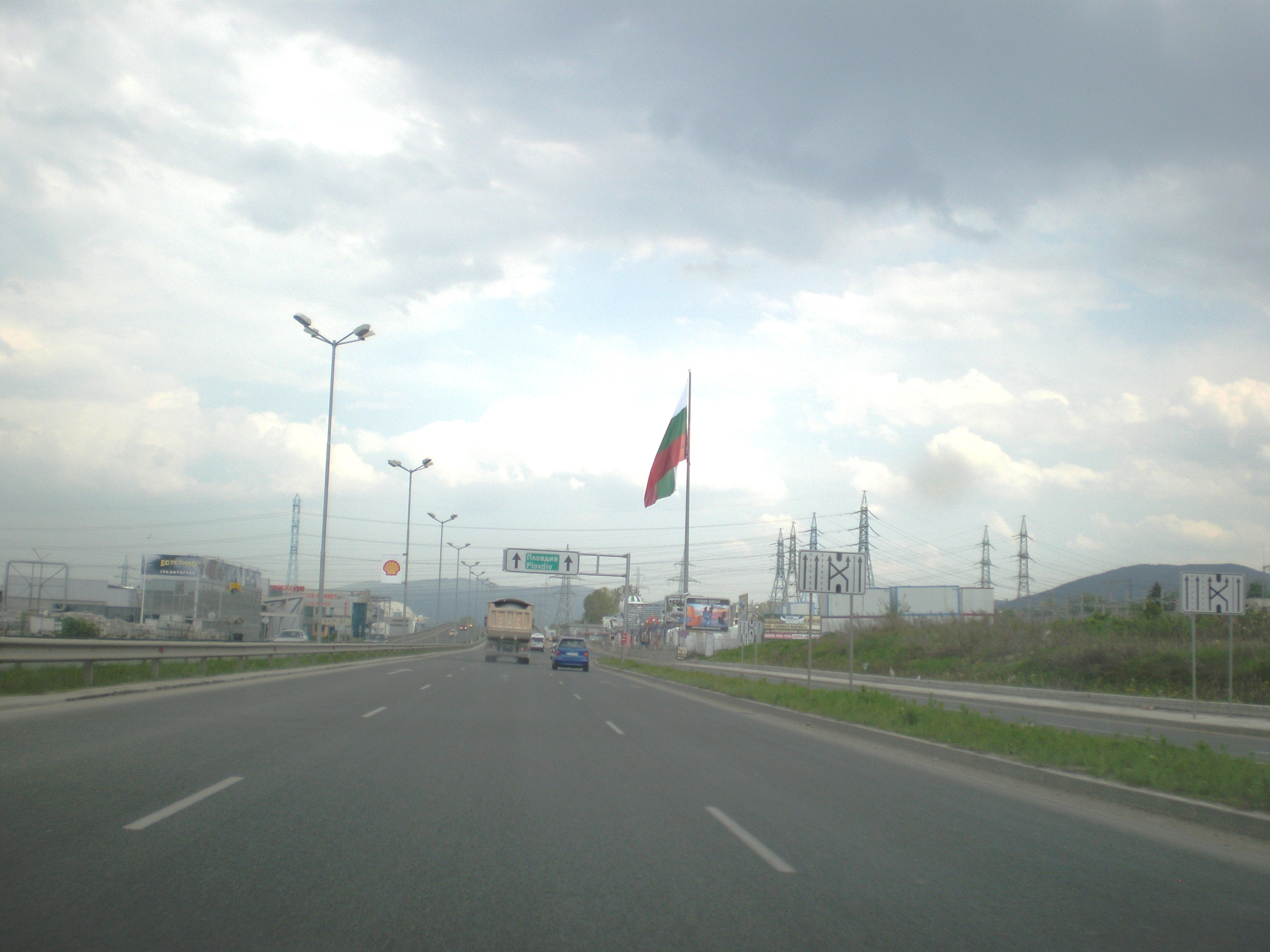
Sofia ring road near Simeonovsko chaussée junction

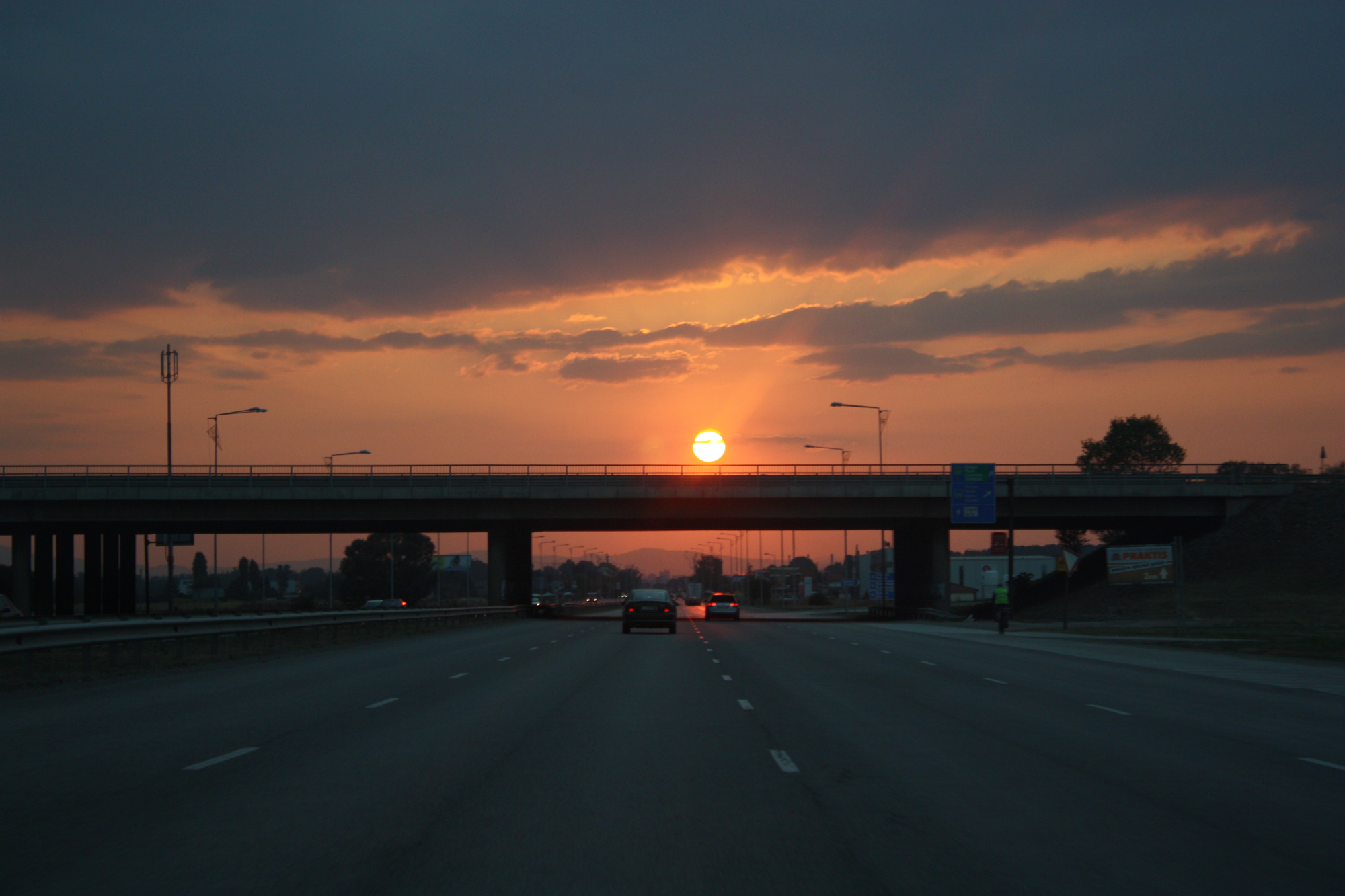
Sofia ring road near the Botevgradsko chaussée junction

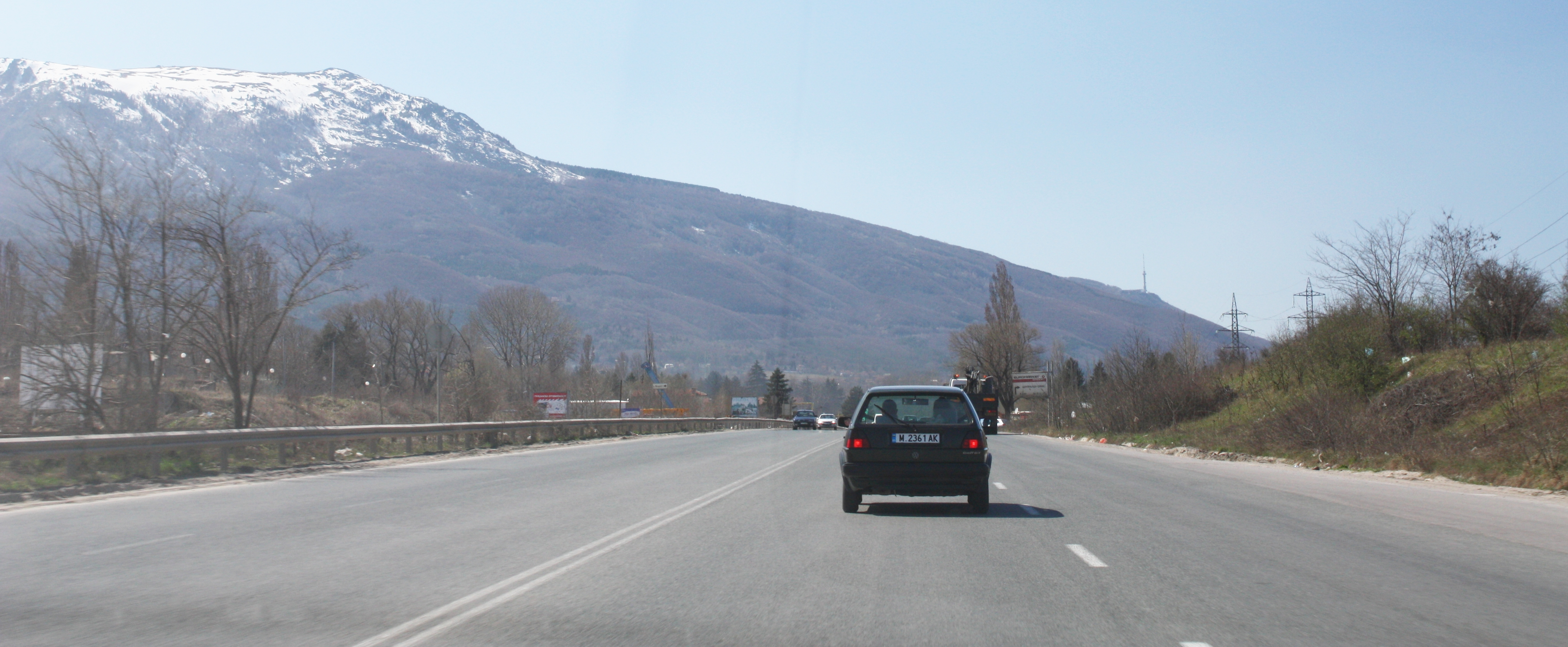
Looking at Vitosha

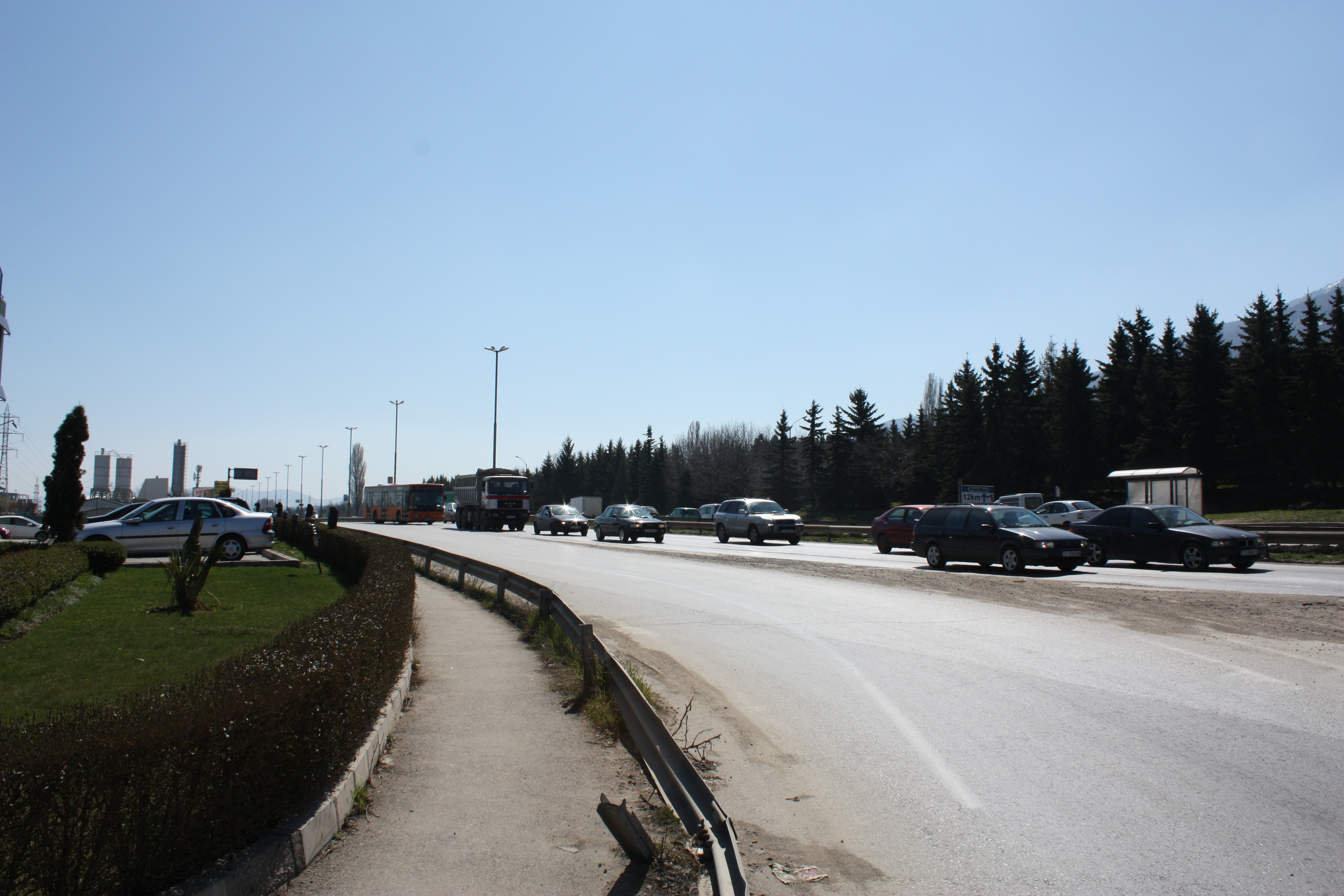
Next to the National Historical Museum
