= Maritsa motorway =

Motorway in Bulgaria

Maritsa motorway
- Автомагистрала „Марица“
- Maritsa motorway highlighted in red and yellow

Route information
- Part of E80
- Length: 117 km (73 mi)

Major junctions
- West end: A1 near Chirpan
- East end: D.100 near Kapitan Andreevo

Location
- Country: Bulgaria
- Major cities: Dimitrovgrad, Haskovo, Svilengrad

Highway system
- Highways in Bulgaria

The Maritsa motorway (Bulgarian: Автомагистрала „Марица“, Avtomagistrala "Maritsa"), designated A4, is a motorway in Bulgaria, part of the Pan-European Corridor IV, between the Trakia motorway (A1), at the town of Chirpan, and Kapitan Andreevo, at the Turkish border.

The planned completion of the last remaining stretch of the motorway was in 2013, but a delay occurred and the complete motorway enterеd service in October 2015.

It is named after the Maritsa River.

== History ==
In October 2010, a 31 km section of the Maritsa motorway between the towns of Harmanli and Lyubimets officially opened to traffic. The new interchange at Kapitan Petvo Voyvoda neighbourhood of Svilengrad, providing direct connection with the border crossing to Greece, also opened in October 2010. During construction, 6000-year-old Neolithic remains were found near Haskovo. The bypass of Kapitan Andreevo village in the border area entered service in August 2014. The construction of the Haskovo-Harmanli section began in July 2011 and was completed on 28 May 2015. An 8.6 kilometres (5.3 mi) long second carriageway near Svilengrad was inaugurated on 7 June 2015, while the other carriageway had been built during the 1980s. The last remaining section, between Chirpan and Haskovo, entered service on 29 October 2015.

The construction of the Chirpan-Haskovo and the Haskovo-Harmanli sections of the motorway was co-funded by EU funds allocated for Bulgaria, while a small section at the Turkish border was co-funded with a loan from the IBRD. Its route runs parallel to the existing major road 8, which is mainly two-lane and carried much of the road freight to and from Turkey and the Middle East. The completion of the Maritsa motorway attempts to reduce this congestion.

== Exits ==
Exit	km	Destinations	Lanes	Notes
	0	(Sofia, Plovdiv, Stara Zagora, Yambol, Burgas)		In service
	17,8	Zlatna Livada		In service
	38,8	Haskovo, Dimitrovgrad		In service
	65,6	Simeonovgrad, Harmanli		In service
	70,3	Topolovgrad, Harmanli		In service
	89,4	Lyubimets		In service
	99,2	Svilengrad-west; (Greece)		In service
	102,5	Svilengrad		In service
	114	Kapitan Andreevo		In service
	117,3	Kapitan Andreevo; (Turkey) Edirne D100 , Istanbul		In service
