= Krusha, Varna Province =

Krusha
- Village
- Location within Bulgaria
- Coordinates: 43°02′N 27°46′E
- Country: Bulgaria
- Province: Varna Province
- Municipality: Avren
- Time zone: UTC+2 (EET)
  - Summer (DST): UTC+3 (EEST)

Krusha is a village in the municipality of Avren, in Varna Province, northeastern Bulgaria.
