= Dobri Dol, Varna Province =

Dobri Dol
- Village
- Location within Bulgaria
- Coordinates: 43°04′18″N 27°45′13″E
- Country: Bulgaria
- Province: Varna Province
- Municipality: Avren
- Time zone: UTC+2 (EET)
  - Summer (DST): UTC+3 (EEST)

Dobri Dol is a village in the municipality of Avren, in Varna Province, Bulgaria.
