= Bliznatsi, Varna Province =

Coordinates: 43°04′N 27°52′E

Bliznatsi (Bulgarian: Близнаци) is a village in Avren Municipality in northeastern Bulgaria close to the Black Sea Coast. Meaning "twins" in Bulgarian, Bliznatsi is actually two small villages located on neighboring hilltops. Over time, as the villages grew, the formed one single governing town of over 1,600 permanent and temporary residents.

== Village Life ==
The town holiday of Bliznatsi is 24 May. The orthodox temple located in town is dedicated to Archangel Michael. The P.R. Slaveykov Community Center works to promote cultural projects and learning; there is a women's folklore singing group and a children's dance group.

== Economy ==
Tourism plays the largest role in the economic structuring of Bliznatsi. Due to the proximity of the Black Sea Coast and the Kamchia Resort Complex, the town has recently become an attractive location for vacation homes. The location of the town just off route 9, a major north–south coastal highway in Bulgaria, makes the commerce and services sectors prominent in the local economy as well.
