= Mladinovo =

- Village
- Location within Bulgaria
- Coordinates: 41°56′N 26°14′E
- Country: Bulgaria
- Province: Haskovo Province
- Municipality: Svilengrad
- Time zone: UTC+2 (EET)
  - Summer (DST): UTC+3 (EEST)

Mladinovo (Bulgarian: Младиново) is a village in the municipality of Svilengrad, in the Haskovo Province, situated on the foot of the Sakar Mountain in southern Bulgaria.

Until 1934, the name of the village was Enia.

== History ==
In the vicinity of the village of Mladinovo, 12 dolmens, 76 dolmens and 146 burial mounds have been found.

During the Ottoman rule, the village was called Enia (New Village).

Since 1912, the village has been a part of Bulgaria. The settlements in the Svilengrad Municipality were liberated from the Ottoman rule on October 1, 1913. In 1934, the village was renamed to Mladinovo.

There are Bulgarian, Turkish and Roma communities in the village of Mladinovo, located in two hamlets - upper and lower.

The events connected with the name of Mladinovo are not known. It is assumed that Vasil Levski visited Mladinovo.

The last mayor (Мukhtap) of the village from the time before the liberation was Stoil Paunov Kolev.
