= Kazashka Reka =

Kazashka reka
- Village
- Location within Bulgaria
- Coordinates: 43°05′N 27°38′E
- Country: Bulgaria
- Province: Varna Province
- Municipality: Avren
- Time zone: UTC+2 (EET)
  - Summer (DST): UTC+3 (EEST)

Kazashka Reka is a village in the municipality of Avren, in Varna Province, northeastern Bulgaria.
