= Trakia motorway =

Motorway in Bulgaria

Trakia motorway
- Автомагистрала „Тракия“
- Trakia motorway highlighted in red and yellow

Route information
- Part of E80
- Length: 360 km (220 mi)
- Existed: 2013–present

Major junctions
- From: Sofia
- To: Burgas

Location
- Country: Bulgaria
- Major cities: Pazardzhik, Plovdiv, Stara Zagora, Yambol

Highway system
- Highways in Bulgaria

The Trakia motorway (Bulgarian: Автомагистрала „Тракия“, Avtomagistrala "Trakiya") or Thrace motorway, designated A1, is a motorway in Bulgaria. It connects the capital city of Sofia, the city of Plovdiv and the city of Burgas on the Black Sea coast. The motorway is named after the historical region of Thrace, the northern (Bulgarian) part of which it spans from west to east. The total length of Trakia motorway is 360 km (220 mi) and the final section opened on 15 July 2013 after 40 years of construction.

Trakia motorway connects with the Sofia ring road at its east end, allowing fast access to Hemus motorway (A2) and Struma motorway (A3) via Sofia Northern Bypass motorway (part of Europe motorway, A6).

At its east end, nearby Burgas, Trakia motorway will merge with the planned Cherno More motorway (A5) providing fast access from the south to the city of Varna and the beach resorts on the Black Sea.

Maritsa motorway (A4) branches off at Orizovo Interchange at kilometer 169 to link Trakia motorway with Turkey at the Kapitan Andreevo border crossing. The interchange is situated between Plovdiv and Chirpan, roughly 5 km north of Parvomay.

== History ==
The construction of the motorway began in 1973 and the first 10 km from Sofia to Novi Han entered in service in 1978. In 1984 the motorway reached Plovdiv, the second largest city in Bulgaria. In 1995 a 32 km section between Plovdiv and Plodovitovo interchange was completed with EBRD co-financing. In 2000 EIB loan was secured for the construction of two sections, between Orizovo interchange and Stara Zagora (lot 1), and lot 5, between Karnobat and Burgas, fourth largest city, situated at the Black sea coast. The motorway reached Stara Zagora in 2007, and lot 5 entered in service in 2006.

Meanwhile, in 2005 a controversial concession contract was signed by the Bulgarian government and a Portuguese-led consortium. The concession was granted for 35 years without tender procedure and included 433 km from the Serbian border, at Kalotina border checkpoint, to Burgas. However, the contract was cancelled in 2008 and the sections between Stara Zagora and Karnobat (lots 2, 3 and 4) were approved for EU funds financing.

In 2009 and 2010, tenders for the construction of Stara Zagora - Nova Zagora, Nova Zagora - Yambol-west interchange, and Yambol-west interchange - Karnobat sections, totalling 116.8 km, were conducted and contracts were signed. The sections between Stara Zagora and Yambol-east interchange opened to traffic in mid-2012, while the last remaining section between Yambol-east interchange and Karnobat interchange was completed on 15 July 2013.

== Exits ==
Exit	km	Destinations	Lanes	Notes
	0	Sofia ring road, Tsarigradsko shose		In service
	4,4	Lozen, Ravno pole		In service
	5.9	Novi Han		In service
	23,3	Vakarel		In service
	34,3	Ihtiman-north		In service
	46,2	Ihtiman-south, Kostenets		In service
	54,0	Trayanovi vrata (675 m)		In service
	60,2	Vetren		In service
	68,9	Tserovo, Velingrad		In service
	79,8	Kalugerovo, Dinkata		In service
	89,9	Pazardzhik, Panagyurishte		In service
	112,3	Tsalapitsa, Saedinenie		In service
	118,9	Plovdiv-west, Pamporovo (to and from west only)		In service
	120,6	Plovdiv-west, Pamporovo (to and from east only)		In service
	126,1	Plovdiv-north		In service
	132,3	Plovdiv-east		In service
	137,2	Trilistnik		In service
	150,2	Belozem		In service
	164,3	Parvomay, Plodovitovo		In service
	168,5	(Haskovo/Dimitrovgrad; Istanbul (Turkey) ; (Greece) )		In service
	174,5	Chirpan-west		In service
	184,7	Chirpan-east, Stara Zagora-west		In service
	208,2	Stara Zagora, Haskovo		In service
	240	Nova Zagora		In service
	275,4	Yambol-west, Sliven		In service
	283	Rest area, Kabile		In service
	289,4	Yambol-east		In service
	323,8	Karnobat		In service
	351	Balgarovo, Neftochim oil refinery		In service
	359	Burgas, Vetren, Aytos		In service

== Gallery ==
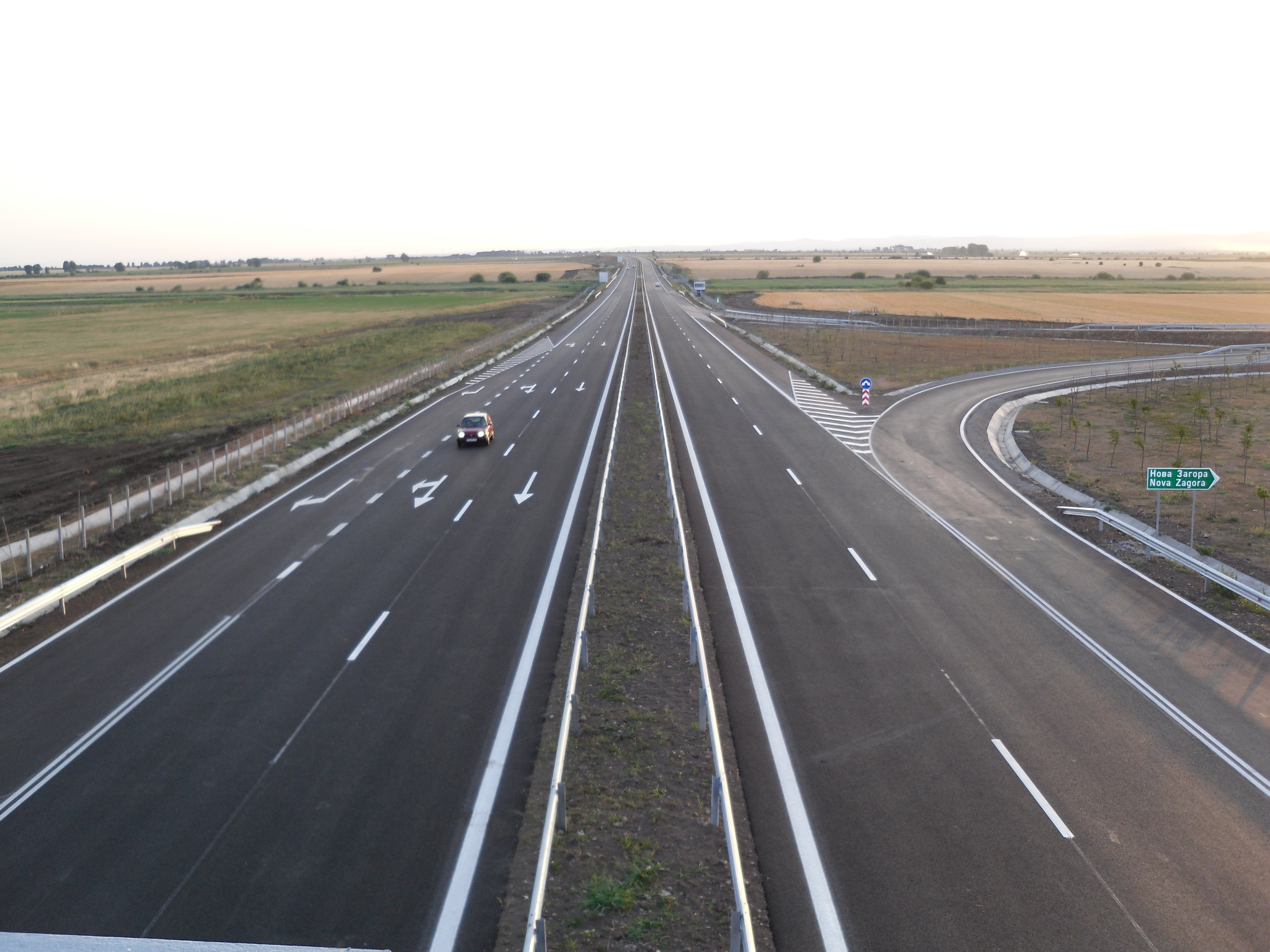
Trakia motorway near Nova Zagora

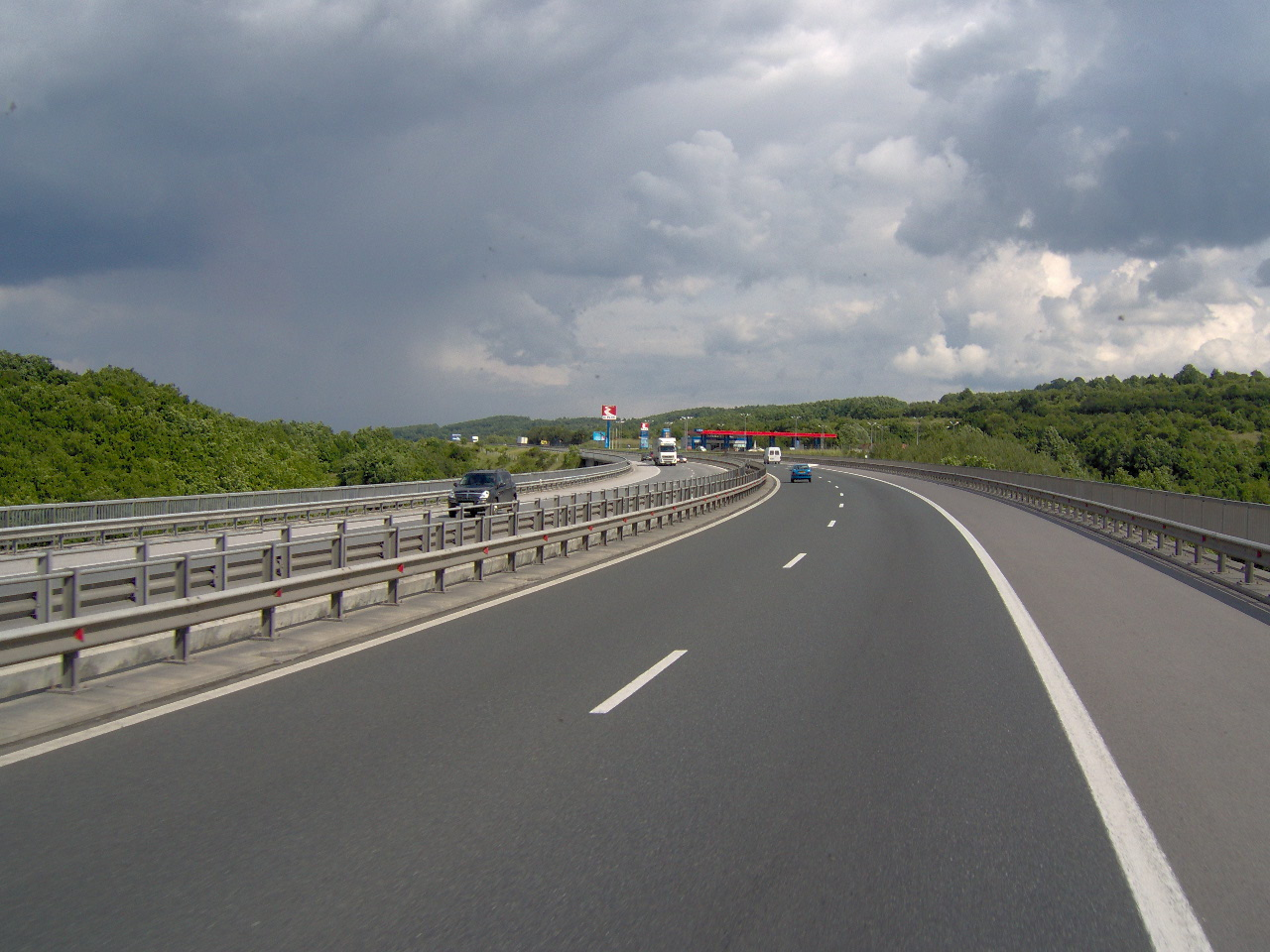
Trakia motorway near the village of Vakarel

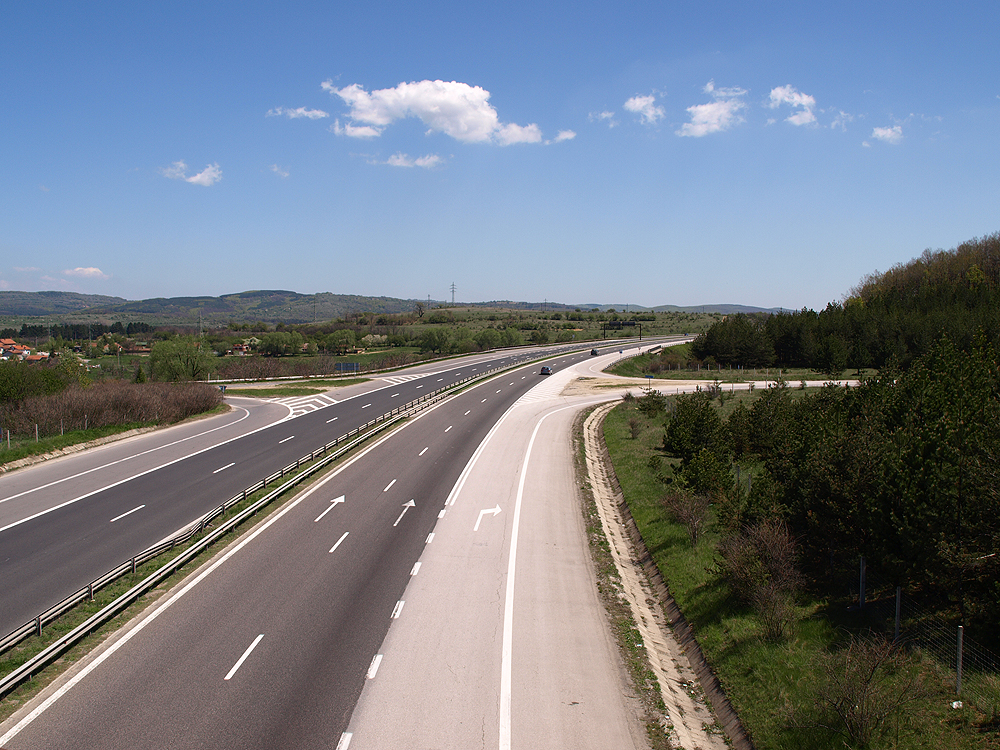
Trakia motorway at Vakarel-Panagyurishte junction

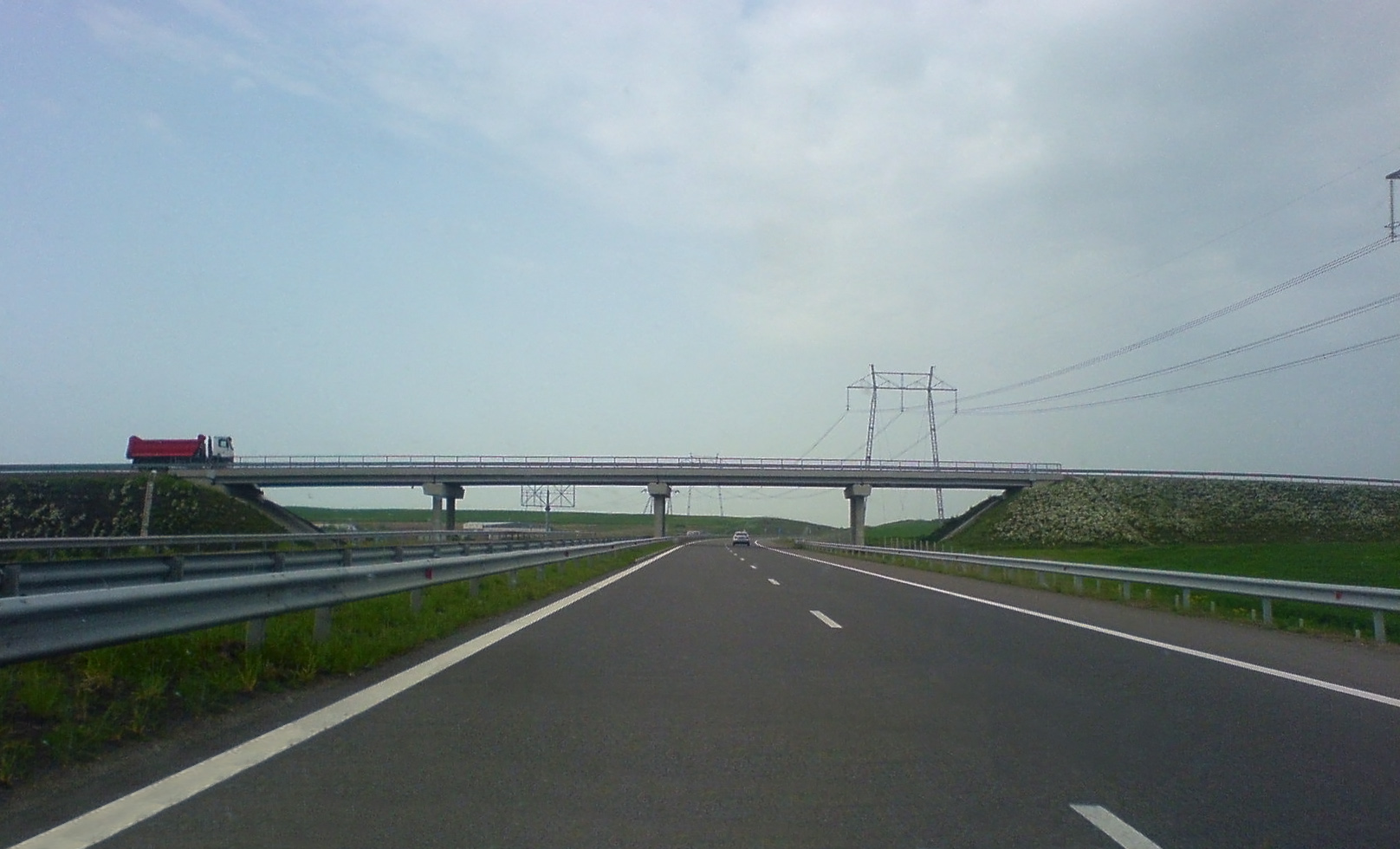
Trakia motorway near Burgas
