= Tsarevtsi, Varna Province =

Tsarevtsi
- Village
- Location within Bulgaria
- Coordinates: 43°05′25″N 27°34′11″E
- Country: Bulgaria
- Province: Varna Province
- Municipality: Avren

Population (2007)
  - Total: 891
- Time zone: UTC+2 (EET)
  - Summer (DST): UTC+3 (EEST)

Tsarevtsi is a village in the municipality of Avren, in Varna Province, northeastern Bulgaria.
