= Sindel (village) =

- Village
- Location in Bulgaria
- Coordinates: 43.109469°N 27.605868°E
- Country: Bulgaria
- Province: Varna Province
- Municipality: Avren

Population (2016)
  - Total: 1,221
- Time zone: UTC+2 (EET)
  - Summer (DST): UTC+3 (EEST)

Sindel is a village in the municipality of Avren, in Varna Province, northeastern Bulgaria. It's an important railway junction for the Varna-Sofia railway line, and the railway to the settlements of Dalgopol, Komunari, Asparuhovo and Karnobat.
