= Asparuhovo, Varna =

Asparuhovo Аспарухово
- District
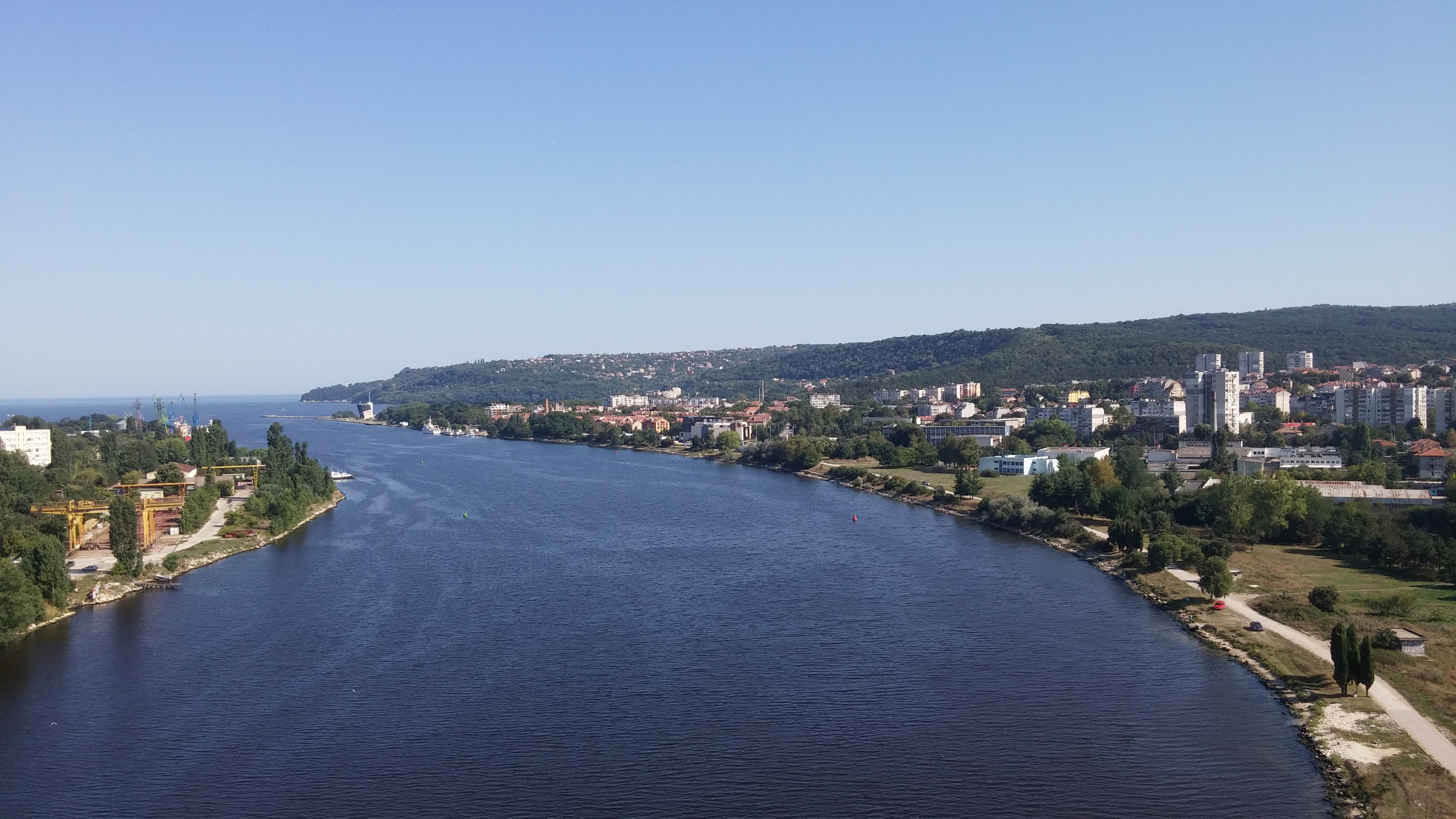
- View of the district from the Asparuhov bridge.

- Location in Bulgaria
- Coordinates: 43.179°N 27.888°E
- Country: Bulgaria
- Province: Varna Province
- Municipality: Varna Municipality
- Town: Varna

Population (2014)
  - Total: 27 000
- Postal code: 9003

Asparuhovo is a district of Varna. It is located in the southern part of the town and has a population of 27 000. In the district are located the Institute of Oceanology and the Bulgarian Ship Hydrodynamics Center, both part of the Bulgarian Academy of Sciences. Asparuhovo is located south of Varna just over the bridge and is 20 mins from Varna Airport and the main centre of varna Asparuhovo is a district situated in the outskirts of Varna. The local beach is vast and tranquil together with the marina with fish restaurants and beach bars. It is not attended by many tourists and suits well people who want to enjoy the sea and the beach but are on a tight budget. There are water attractions on the beach like water wheels, windsurf, etc. Nearby, there are also restaurants that offer food and drink.

Asparuhovo has a wide range of supermarkets, restaurants, cafes and bakeries and clothes shops. It also has many local parks with many local public transport links to central Varna.

15 minutes away from Aparuhovo is Borovets Villa Zone and also Galata which are where most local and private properties are located.

== History ==
Asparuhovo has existed on the map since 1903 when it was still a village with the name of Ses Sevmes (quiet place). The village was briefly renamed to Tihina in 1934 until 1936 when it received its current name. The name Asparuhovo is motivated by the fact that in 681 Asparuh of Bulgaria reached the city of Varna.

In 1976 a canal connecting lake Varna and the Black Sea was dug between Asparuhovo and the rest of Varna. The Asparuhov Bridge was built at the same time above the canal so the district wouldn't be separated from the rest of the city.

== 2014 Flooding ==
On June 19, 2014 severe rainfall in the district caused the drowning of 14 people as well as heavy infrastructure damage.
