= Pass of the Republic =

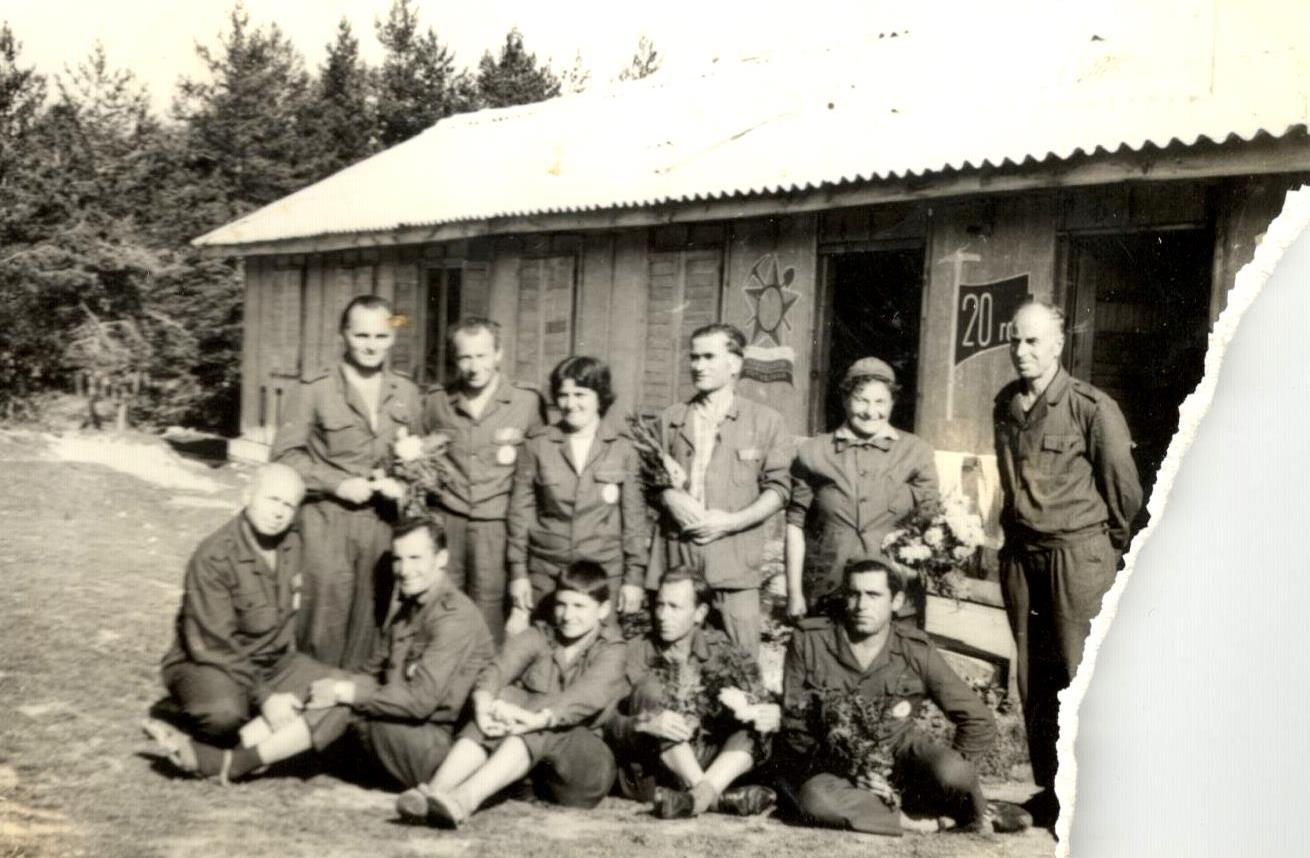
- Interactive map of Pass of the Republic
- Elevation: 700 m (2,300 ft)
- Traversed by: Road

Location
- Location: Bulgaria
- Range: Balkan Mountains
- Coordinates: 42°47′50″N 25°40′30″E

Pass of the Republic (Bulgarian: Проход на Републиката [ˈprɔhot narɛˈpublikɐtɐ]), is a mountain pass in the Balkan Mountains (Stara Planina) in Bulgaria. It connects Veliko Tarnovo and Gurkovo.

It is also known as Hainboaz Pass (Хаинбоаз [xɐˈinboˌas]).

The road was constructed in the 1960s.
