= Yunak, Bulgaria =

Yunak
- Village
- Location within Bulgaria
- Coordinates: 43°05′N 27°36′E
- Country: Bulgaria
- Province: Varna Province
- Municipality: Avren
- Time zone: UTC+2 (EET)
  - Summer (DST): UTC+3 (EEST)

Yunak is a village in the municipality of Avren, in Varna Province, northeastern Bulgaria.

== Honours ==
Yunak Peak on Brabant Island, Antarctica is named after the village.
