= Speed limits in Bulgaria =

The speed limits in Bulgaria are:

Speed limit for cars:

- 50 km/h (31 mph) within town and villages
- 90 km/h (56 mph) outside towns
- 120 km/h (75 mph) on expressways
- 140 km/h (87 mph) on motorways

Speed limit for motorcycles:

- 50 km/h (31 mph) within towns and village
- 80 km/h (50 mph) outside towns
- 90 km/h (56 mph) on expressways
- 100 km/h (62 mph) on motorways

Speed limit for cars with trailers, buses and trucks:

- 50 km/h (31 mph) within towns and village
- 70 km/h (43 mph) outside towns
- 90 km/h (56 mph) on expressways
- 100 km/h (62 mph) on motorways

Speed limit for trucks carrying dangerous goods:

- 40 km/h (25 mph) within towns
- 50 km/h (31 mph) outside towns
- 70 km/h (43 mph) on expressways
- 90 km/h (56 mph) on motorways

Speed limits for towing vehicles:

- 40 km/h (25 mph) within towns and outside towns
- 70 km/h (43 mph) on expressways and motorways (towing is only allowed with a rigid tow)

Speed limit for tractors, trolleybuses and trams:

- 50 km/h (31 mph)

Speed limit for mopeds:

- 45 km/h (28 mph)

Speed limit for other automobiles:

- 40 km/h (25 mph)
