= Benkovski, Varna Province =

Village in Avren, Varna, Bulgaria

Coordinates: 43°07′N 27°47′E

Benkovski is a village in the Avren Municipality in Varna Province in Northeast Bulgaria. The village is home to over 650 permanent residents, with roughly 40 temporary or seasonal residents. There are 2 grocery shops, and 2 hardware stores. There is a Kindergarten and 2 playgrounds. This small village is named after Georgi Benkovski.

== Village life ==
The village holiday falls on the last Sunday of September. There are several institutions that support local village life; the Zora Community Center, a kindergarten, an Aerobics club for both youth and adults, and a football club.

== Economy ==
Agriculture is the main industry in the village, with a focus on plum and sour cherry orchards. The SECASTA Company produces carved stone from a quarry near the village for the manufacture of fireplaces and is a major distributor of Deauville Fireplace products. There are also two furniture-making companies, a yacht sail making and repair workshop and a commercial snail farm in the village.
