= Priseltsi, Varna Province =

Priseltsi
- Village
- Location within Bulgaria
- Coordinates: 43°06′30″N 27°49′44″E
- Country: Bulgaria
- Province: Varna Province
- Municipality: Avren
- Time zone: UTC+2 (EET)
  - Summer (DST): UTC+3 (EEST)

Priseltsi is a village in the municipality of Avren, in Varna Province, northeastern Bulgaria.
