= Gurkovo =

Gurkovo Гурково
- Town
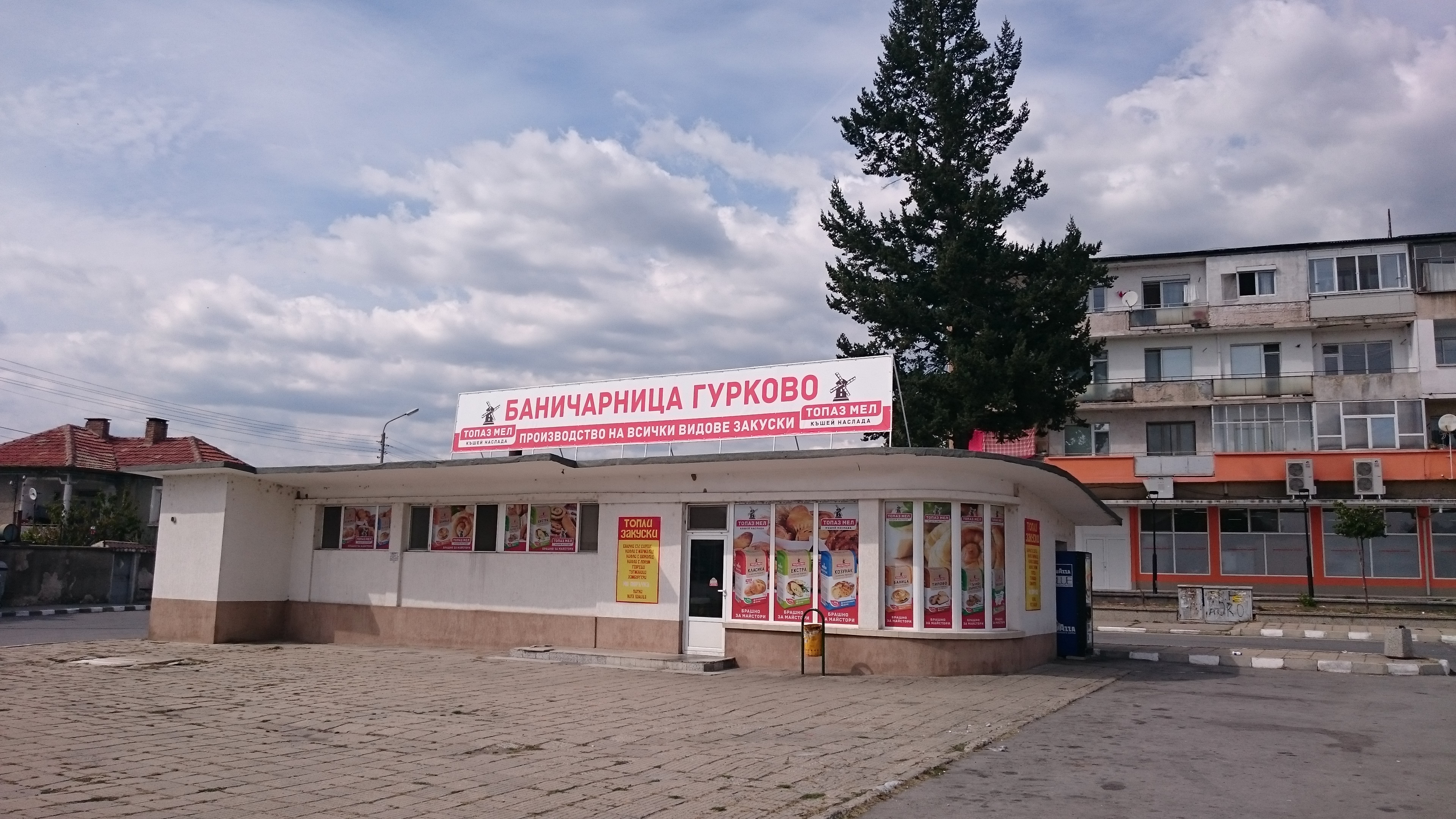

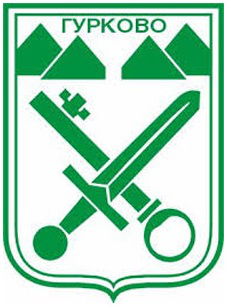
- Coat of arms

- Location in Bulgaria
- Coordinates: 42°39′26″N 25°47′46″E
- Country: Bulgaria
- Province: Stara Zagora
- Municipality: Gurkovo

Government
  - Mayor: Kuncho Papazov (Independent;2023)

Area
  - Total: 58,323 km^{2} (22,519 sq mi)
- Elevation: 350 m (1,150 ft)

Population (2024)
  - Total: ▲2,999
- Postal code: 6199
- Area code: 04331
- Vehicle registration: СТ

Gurkovo (Bulgarian: Гурково Bulgarian pronunciation: [ˈɡurkovo]) is a small town in the Stara Zagora Province, south-central Bulgaria. It is situated in the Tvarditsa Valley at the foothills of the Balkan Mountains. The town is the administrative centre of the homonymous Gurkovo Municipality. As of March 2024, the town had a population of 2,999.

It is located along the main route that links the important Bulgarian city of Veliko Tarnovo with the Thrace region of Bulgaria, notably Burgas on the Black Sea.

== Etymology ==
The town is named after General Iosif Gurko, one of Russian commanders in Russo-Turkish War (1877–1878).

== Population ==
As of December 2018, there were 2,723 inhabitants living in the town of Gurkovo. Bulgarians constitute 75% of the population, while Romani people make up the remainder (24%). There are also a few Turks. The main religion is Orthodox Christianity.
