= Bolyartsi, Varna Province =

Bolyartsi
- Village
- Location within Bulgaria
- Coordinates: 43°04′14″N 27°47′59″E
- Country: Bulgaria
- Province: Varna Province
- Municipality: Avren
- Time zone: UTC+2 (EET)
  - Summer (DST): UTC+3 (EEST)

Bolyartsi is a village in the municipality of Avren, in Varna Province, Bulgaria.

Housing one of the 230+ total airport's in Bulgaria. (Website)
