= Chirpan =

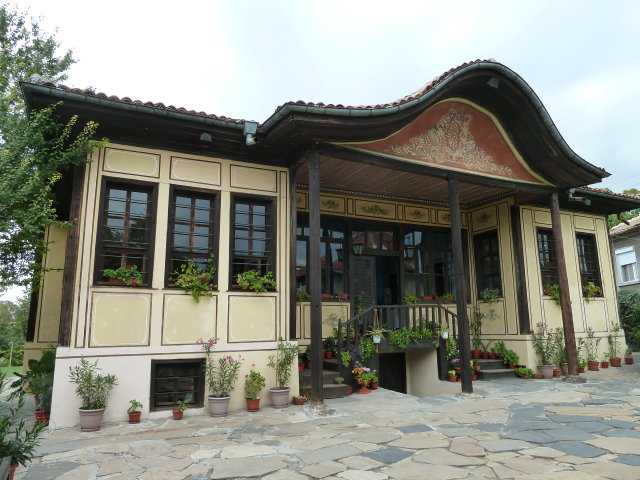

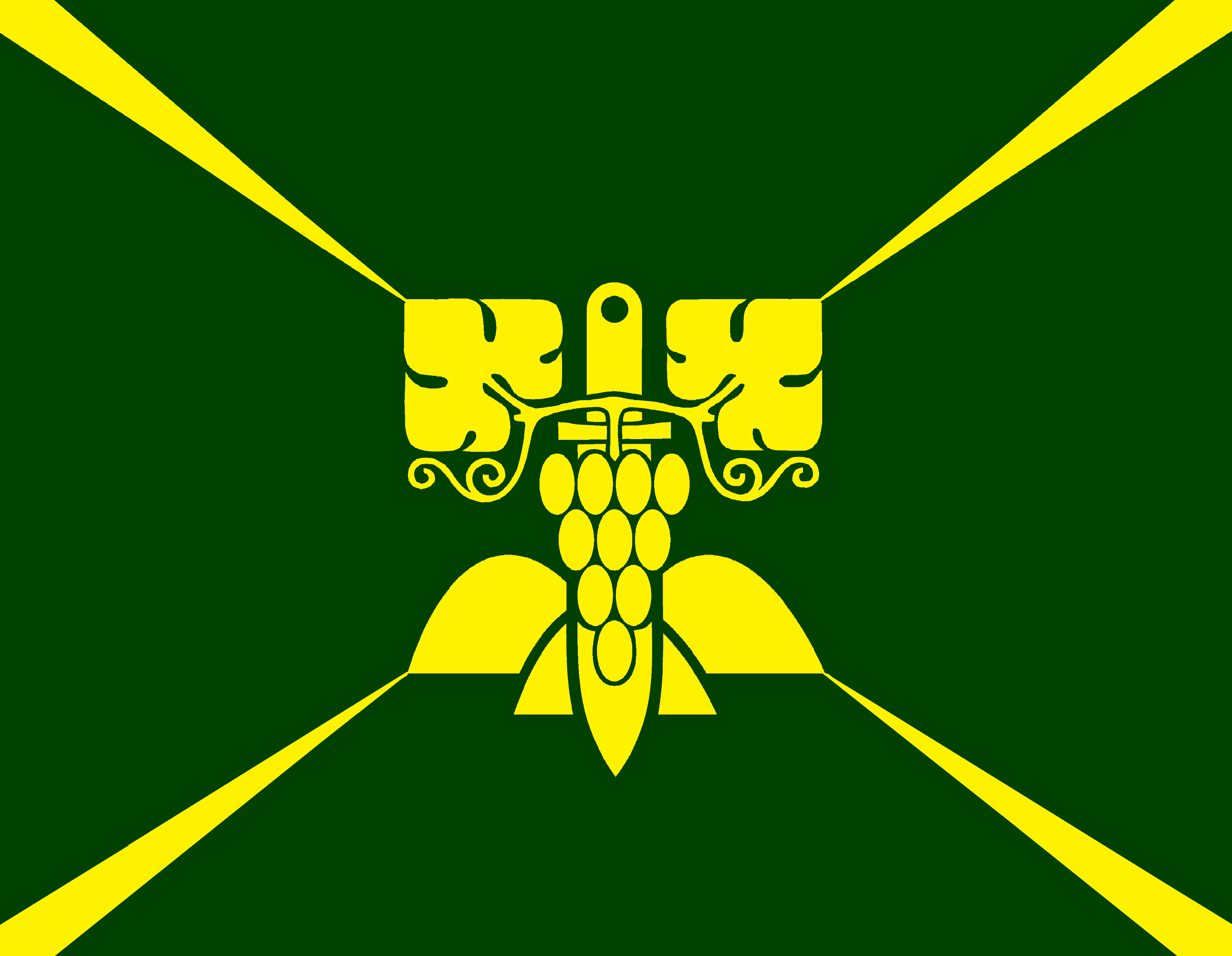
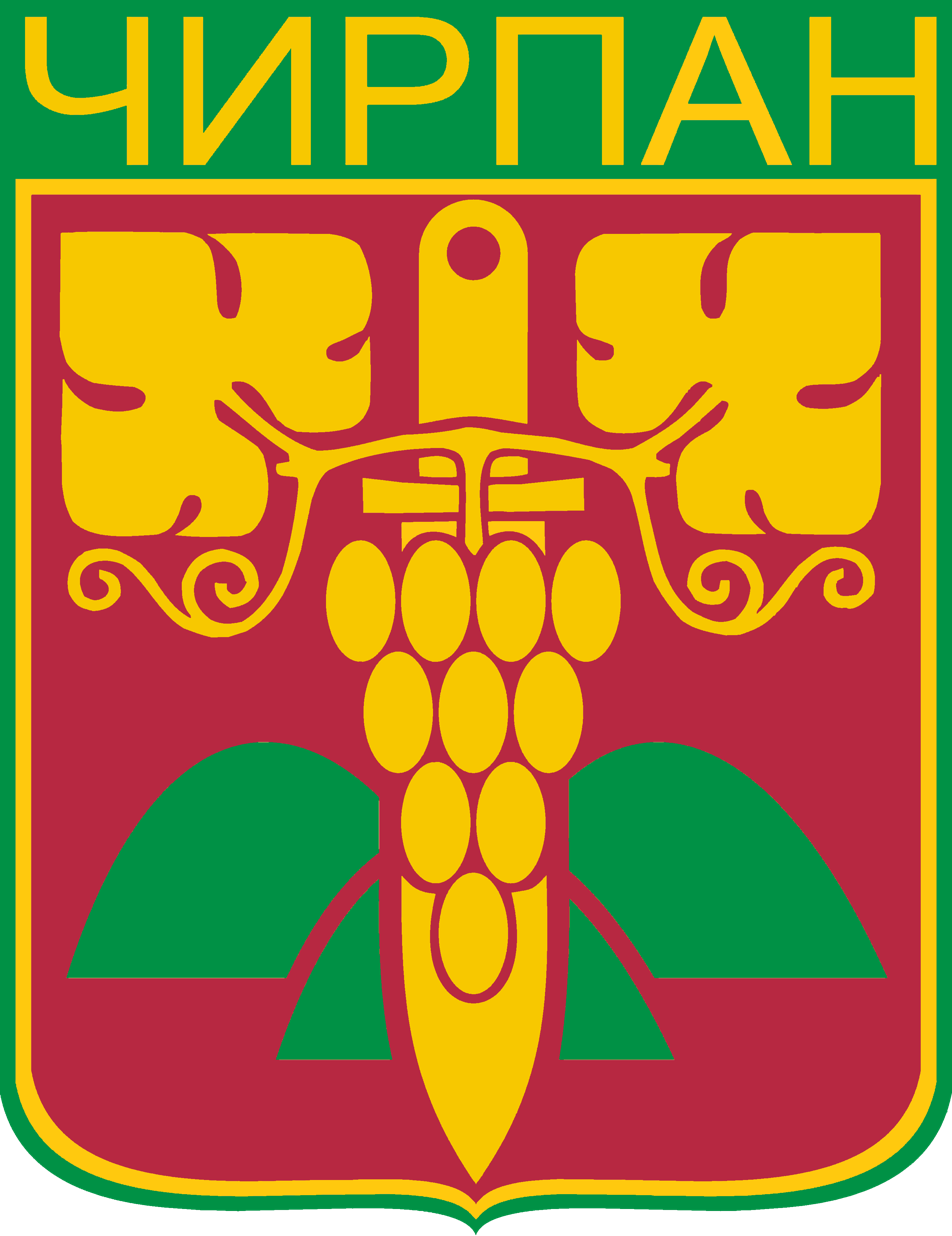
- Flag Coat of arms

- Location of Chirpan
- Coordinates: 42°11′59.31″N 25°19′27.87″E
- Country: Bulgaria
- Province (Oblast): Stara Zagora

Government
  - Mayor: Ivaylo Kracholov
- Elevation: 168 m (551 ft)

Population (Census 2021)
  - Total: 13,391
- Time zone: UTC+2 (EET)
  - Summer (DST): UTC+3 (EEST)
- Postal Code: 6200
- Area code: 0416

Chirpan (Bulgarian: Чирпан, pronounced [tʃirˈpan]) is a town on the Tekirska River in Stara Zagora Province of south-central Bulgaria. It is the administrative centre of the homonymous Chirpan Municipality. As of 2021, the town had a population of 13,391, down from 15,109 in 2013.

Chirpan is located north of the Maritsa River on the Chirpan highlands, southeast of the Sredna Gora mountains. The town is a centre for wineries and viticulture.

== History ==
The modern town is the successor of the Ancient Roman settlement of Sherampol and re-emerged in the beginning of the 15th century, its current name likely being derived from the Roman one. Upon his return from the Council of Serdica, Saint Athanasius established the first Christian monastery in Europe circa 344 near modern-day Chirpan in Bulgaria.

There has been extensive archaeological excavation at the Karasura (Carasura) site. Archaeological excavations have revealed that the Karasura has been inhabited since the 4th millennium BC all the way till its abandonment in the 14th century making it one of the longest continuously inhabited settlements in Bulgaria. During the Ottoman rule of Bulgaria, Chirpan (Turkish: Çırpan) was known for its craftsmen and agriculture. The town suffered badly from an earthquake on 18 April 1928.

Chirpan was the birthplace of Ottoman Turkish soldier Abdülkerim Nadir Pasha, and the Bulgarian poet Peyo Yavorov, whose native house is now a museum. Chirpan was the home of painter George Danchov. His house in the centre of the town is an excellent example of Bulgarian National Revival architecture.

== Climate ==
Climate data for Chirpan
Month	Jan	Feb	Mar	Apr	May	Jun	Jul	Aug	Sep	Oct	Nov	Dec	Year
Mean daily maximum °C (°F)	2 (35)	4 (39)	11 (51)	17 (63)	23 (73)	27 (80)	30 (86)	31 (87)	28 (82)	19 (67)	11 (51)	6 (42)	17 (63)
Mean daily minimum °C (°F)	−7 (20)	−6 (22)	−1 (31)	4 (40)	10 (50)	15 (59)	16 (60)	16 (60)	12 (54)	8 (46)	2 (36)	−3 (26)	6 (42)
Average precipitation mm (inches)	33 (1.3)	25 (1)	74 (2.9)	81 (3.2)	46 (1.8)	46 (1.8)	69 (2.7)	51 (2)	7.6 (0.3)	58 (2.3)	51 (2)	13 (0.5)	550 (21.8)
Source: Weatherbase

== Economy ==
There are 18,859 (2021) people in the municipality, two thirds of whom live in the town. 53% of the land is in cultivation, with major crops from wheat, sunflowers, cotton, grapes, and fruit trees. There is a 139 hectare Natura 2000 Special Protection Area for preservation of avian habitat along the Tekirska River.

== Honour ==
Chirpan Peak on Livingston Island in the South Shetland Islands, Antarctica is named after Chirpan.

== Notable people ==
- Georgi Danchov, revolutionary
- Ivan Dimov, actor
- Ivan Kolev (wrestler)
- Peyo Yavorov, poet
- Stoyan Zaimov, revolutionary
