= Kapitan Andreevo =

Kapitan Andreevo Капитан Андреево
- Interactive map of Kapitan Andreevo
- Location of Kapitan Andreevo
- Coordinates: 41°43′14.49″N 26°19′17.59″E
- Country: Bulgaria
- Provinces (Oblast): Haskovo
- Municipality: Svilengrad Municipality
- Named for: Nikola Andreevo

Government
  - Mayor: Milen Milushev (GERB)

Area
  - Total: 28.462 km^{2} (10.989 sq mi)
- Elevation: 348 m (1,142 ft)

Population (December 2009)
  - Total: 969
  - Density: 34.0/km^{2} (88.2/sq mi)
- Time zone: UTC+2 (EET)
  - Summer (DST): UTC+3 (EEST)
- Postal Code: 6530
- Area code: 03773

Kapitan Andreevo (Bulgarian: Капитан Андреево [kɐpiˈtan ɐnˈdrɛɛvo]), known until 1934 as Viran Tekke (Ottoman Turkish: ويران تكى; Bulgarian: Виран Теке) is a village near the Bulgaria—Turkey—Greece tripoint in Svilengrad municipality, Haskovo Province, southern Bulgaria. As of 2005 it has 948 inhabitants and the mayor is Dimitar Shiderov. Due to the proximity with Turkey, there is a major border checkpoint built there, with the Turkish side of the checkpoint being called Kapıkule. The busy Bulgaria–Turkey border crossing at Kapitan Andreevo is an important point of entrance to the European Union. Kapitan Andreevo is located at 41°43′N 26°19′E, 30 metres above sea level.

The checkpoint, one of the busiest in the European Union, has been notorious as an entry point for drugs into the EU, and has long been reported to be run by organized crime.
