= Aksakovo, Bulgaria =

Aksakovo Аксаково
- Location of Aksakovo
- Coordinates: 43°15′N 27°49′E
- Country: Bulgaria
- Provinces (Oblast): Varna

Government
  - Mayor: Atanas Stoilov
- Elevation: 99 m (325 ft)

Population (December 2022)
  - Total: 6,795
- Time zone: UTC+2 (EET)
  - Summer (DST): UTC+3 (EEST)
- Postal Code: 9154
- Area code: 052
- License plate: B

Aksakovo (Bulgarian: Аксаково [akˈsakovo]) is a town in Varna Province, Northeastern Bulgaria. It is the administrative centre of the homonymous Aksakovo Municipality. The town is located on the Franga Plateau three kilometers northwest of the city of Varna. As of December 2022, the municipality had a population of 19,500, while the town itself is home to around 7,000 people.

Aksakovo was declared a town on 27 May 2004. As a village, it was first mentioned in the late 17th century. It is named after Ivan Aksakov.

== Municipality ==
Aksakovo municipality includes the following 23 places:

- Aksakovo
- Botevo
- Dobrogled
- Dolishte
- General Kantardzhievo
- Ignatievo
- Izvorsko
- Kichevo
- Klimentovo
- Krumovo
- Kumanovo
- Lyuben Karavelovo
- Novakovo
- Oreshak
- Osenovo
- Pripek
- Radevo
- Slanchevo
- Vaglen
- Voditsa
- Yarebichna
- Zasmyano
- Zornitsa

== History ==
The history of Aksakovo can be traced back to Thracian times. Near the settlement is located the Roman fortress of Maglish which has had an important role for the development of the settlement and the defence of the region. After the Ottoman Empire took over the Second Bulgarian Empire, there was a decline in the Bulgarian population in the area. The village had predominant Turkish population and was called Adjemler (Persians). When the Treaty of San Stefano (1878) was signed, there was a mass exodus of Turks. The new population consisted by Bulgarian refugees that came from the region around Odrin (Edirne – now Turkey) and Lozengrad (Kırklareli – now Turkey). These refugees are called madzuri (маджури). The old Bulgarian population that was already living in this area is called vayatsi (ваяци). On 14 August 1934, the name of the village was changed from Adjemler to Aksakovo. The new name is after the Russian publicist Ivan Aksakov who was actively involved in the process of the liberation of Bulgaria from the Ottoman Empire.

== International projects: Europe for Citizens Programme ==
Aksakovo municipality was awarded by the Ministry of Culture for its projects in the framework of the European Programme Europe for Citizens. http://europeinfuture.eu/

== Day of Aksakovo ==
Each year the last Sunday of August is announced as the official holiday of the city and it is celebrated annually with events planned by the municipality of Aksakovo.

== Religion ==
The oldest and most important church in Aksakovo is an Eastern Orthodox one and is called Dormition of the Mother of God.

== Industry ==
The biggest factory located in the territory of the city is Plastchim-T. Plastchim-T is one of the leading privately owned European manufacturers of biaxially oriented polypropylene films (BOPP), cast polypropylene films (CPP) and flexible packaging products. For more than half a century, the company has grown from a domestic-type business to a leader in the packaging and packaging-related industry. The production facilities and main office of Built Glass Ltd., which is a manufacturer of tempered glass, laminated glass, bent glass, and insulating glass units, are also located in the town of Aksakovo.

== Sport ==
The football club of Aksakovo is called FC Aksakovo.

== Twin cities ==
Aksakovo is twinned with:

- Cherasco, Italy
- Igualada, Spain
- Setubal, Portugal
- (Moldova) Taraklia, Moldavia
- Warsaw West County, Poland

== Notable people ==
Zachary Karabashliev (born 1968) is a contemporary Bulgarian writer and editor-in-chief of the major publishing house Ciela in Bulgaria
