= Krakra, Bulgaria =

Krakra Кракра
- Village
- Location within Bulgaria
- Coordinates: 43°25′N 27°29′E
- Country: Bulgaria
- Province: Varna Province
- Municipality: Valchi Dol

Area
  - Total: 11.016 km^{2} (4.253 sq mi)
- Elevation: 233 m (764 ft)

Population (2007)
  - Total: 20
- Time zone: UTC+2 (EET)
  - Summer (DST): UTC+3 (EEST)
- Postal code: 9287

Krakra (Bulgarian: Кракра) is a village in Valchi Dol Municipality, in Varna Province, north-eastern Bulgaria. The village is named after the 11th century Bulgarian noble Krakra, governor of Pernik. As of 2007 it had a population of 20 people.
