= Pobiti Kamani =

Rock formation in Varna, Bulgaria

- The Stone Desert
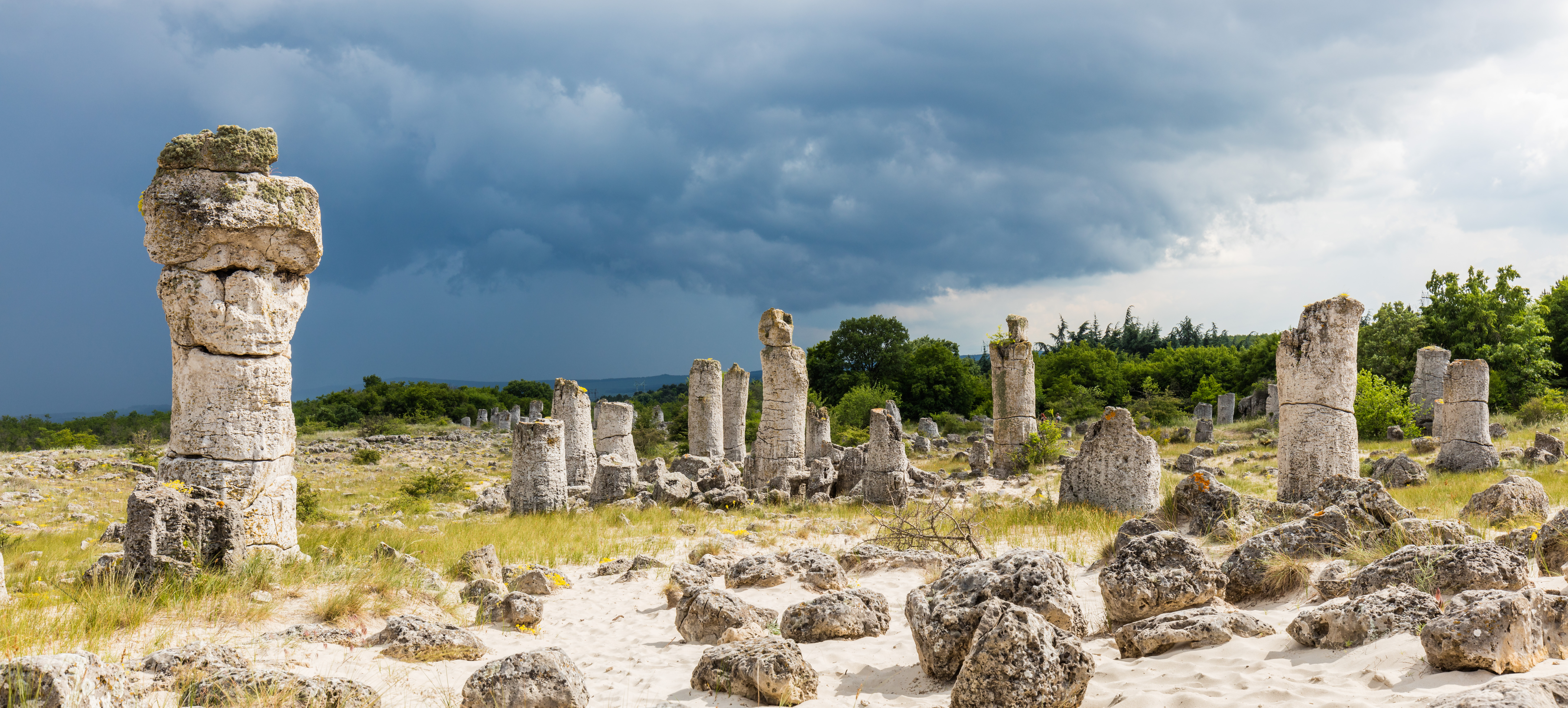
- Rock formations

- Location within Bulgaria
- Location: Varna Province, Bulgaria
- Nearest city: Aksakovo
- Coordinates: 43°13′35″N 27°42′24″E
- Area: 13 sq km (5 sq mi)

Pobiti Kamani (Bulgarian: Побити камъни, "planted stones"), tubular concretions formed around "rising methane-bearing fluid plumes", is a desert-like rock phenomenon located on the north west Varna Province border in Bulgaria.

The stone pillars were first described by Russian archaeologist and historian Victor Teplyakov in 1829. In order to be preserved, Pobiti Kamani was designated a natural landmark in the late 1930s.

There are a number of theories regarding the phenomenon's origin. The pioneering hypotheses can be divided roughly into two groups: suggesting an organic or abiotic origin. According to the former, the formations are the result of coral activity (but detail investigation shows no coral), while the latter explains the phenomenon with the prismatic weathering and desertification of the rocks, the formation of sand and limestone concretions, or lower Eocene bubbling reefs.

Based on a petrographic and stable isotope geochemical study and field observations, evidence exists that these structures represent an exceptional record of paleo-hydrocarbon seep system (low magnesium calcite cements are strongly depleted in heavy carbon isotope ^{13}C). The pathways of fluid circulation are recorded as columns set in sands, which columns after recent sand removal produced a desert-like landscape. The dynamic reconstruction of the origin of these structures, the processes of fluid migration and microbial mediation of hydrocarbon oxidation leading to carbonate precipitation have been studied by De Boever et al. (2009).

Pobiti Kamani occupies an area 8 km (5.0 mi) long and 3 km (1.9 mi) wide, running from north to south. There are seven groups of stone pillars. For example, "Dikilitash", the main group, includes over 350 stones. "Strashimirovo" features four rows of stones that are distinctive for their "bulging" middle segments.

In September 2020, Reuters reported that an image of Pobiti Kamani, photoshopped red, circulated social media under false claims that it was an "original NASA photo of Mars".

== Gallery ==
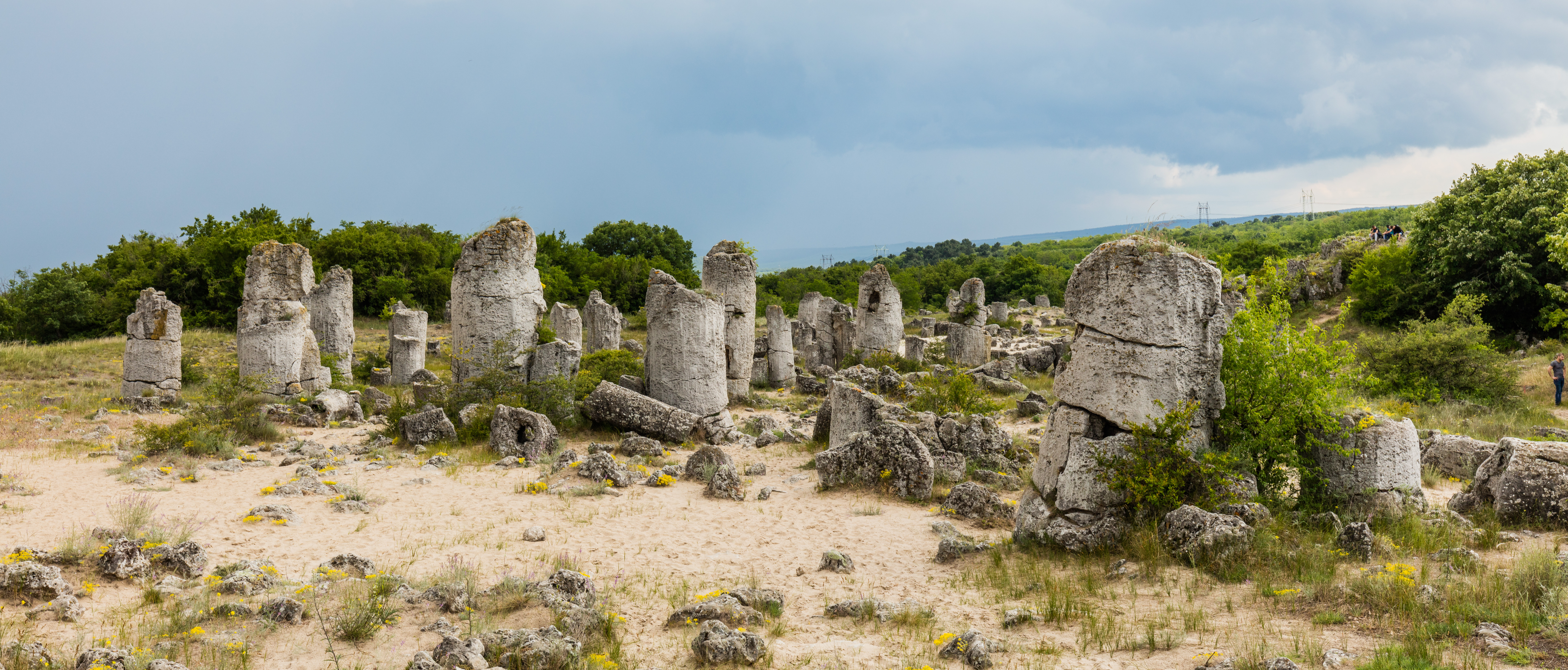

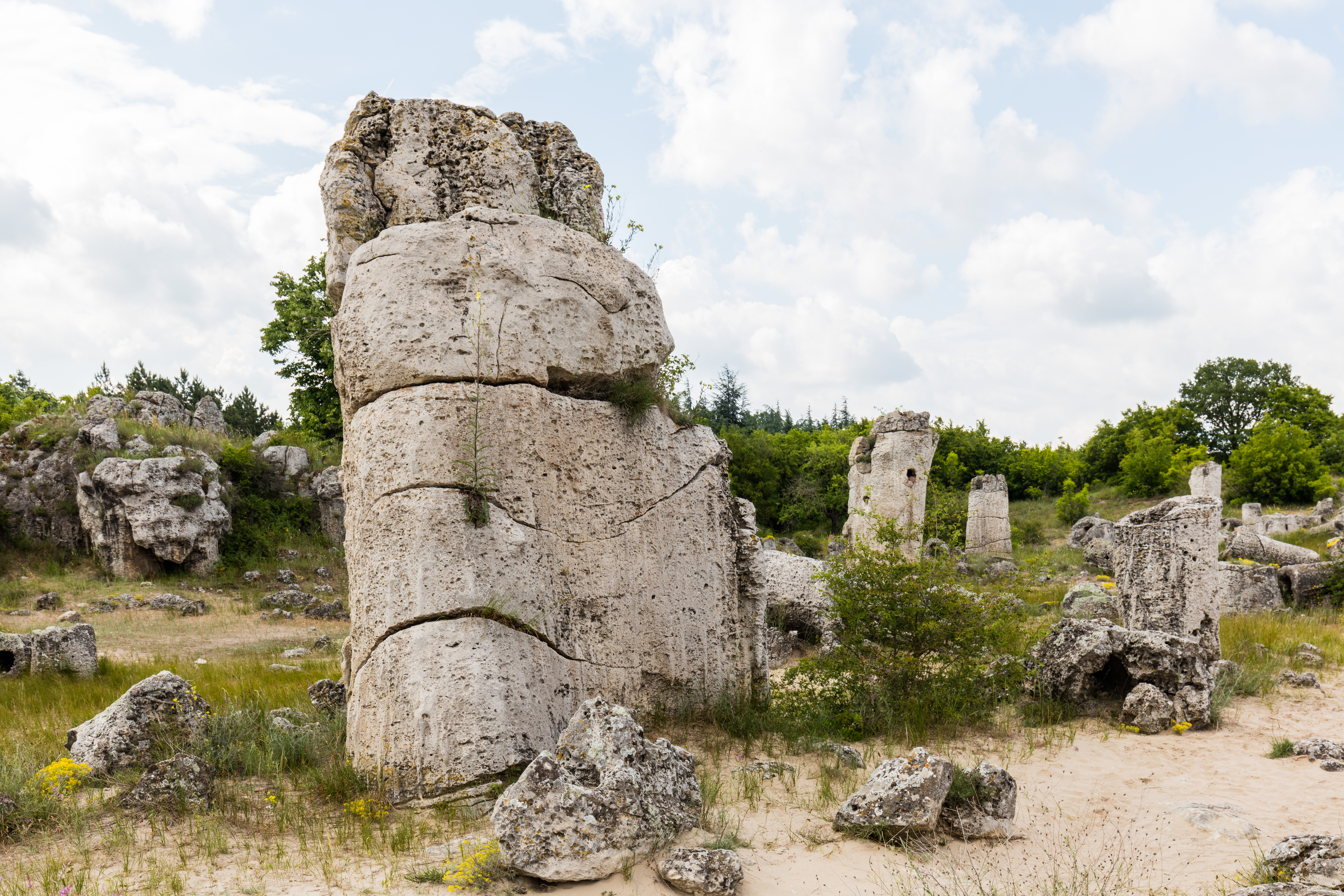

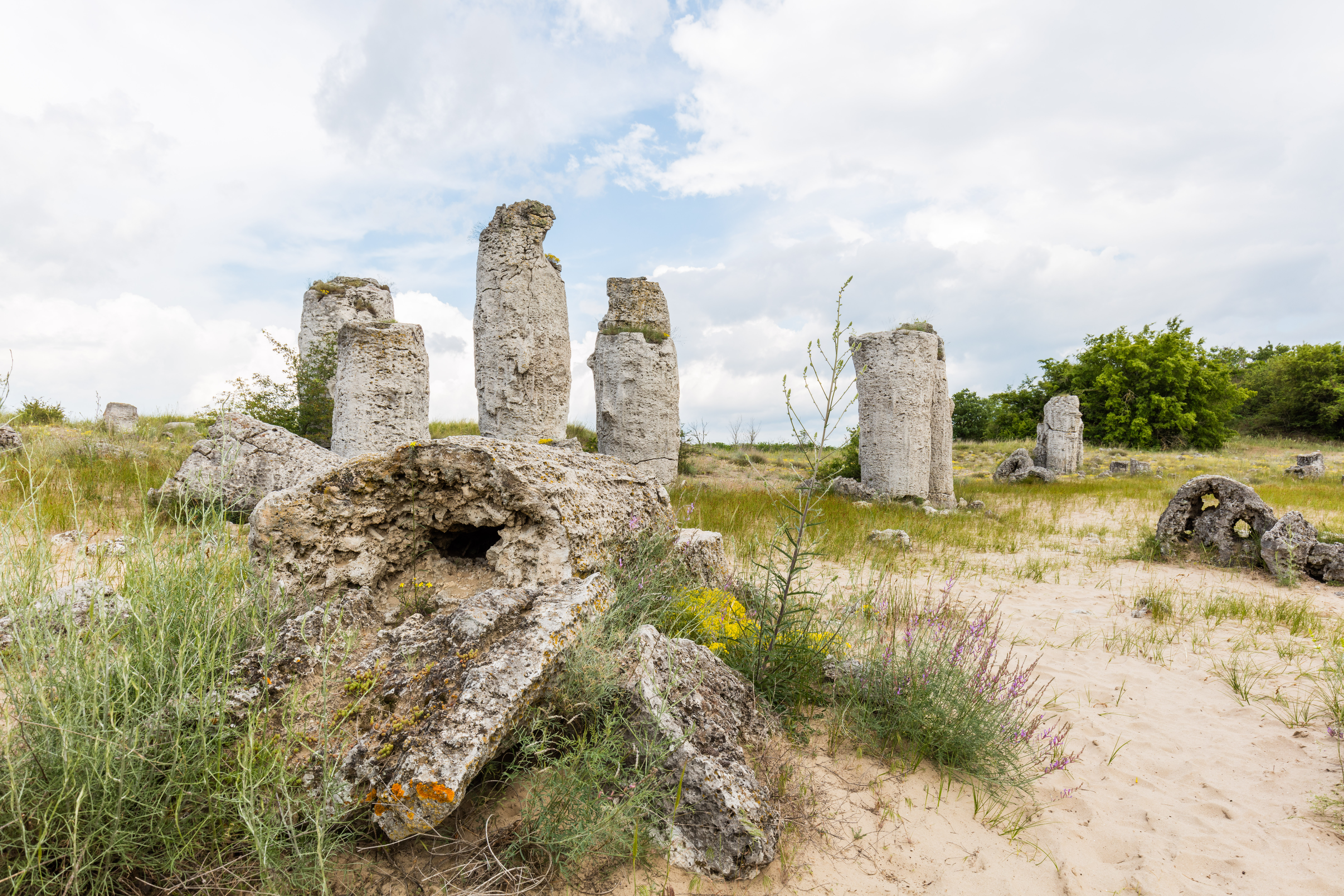

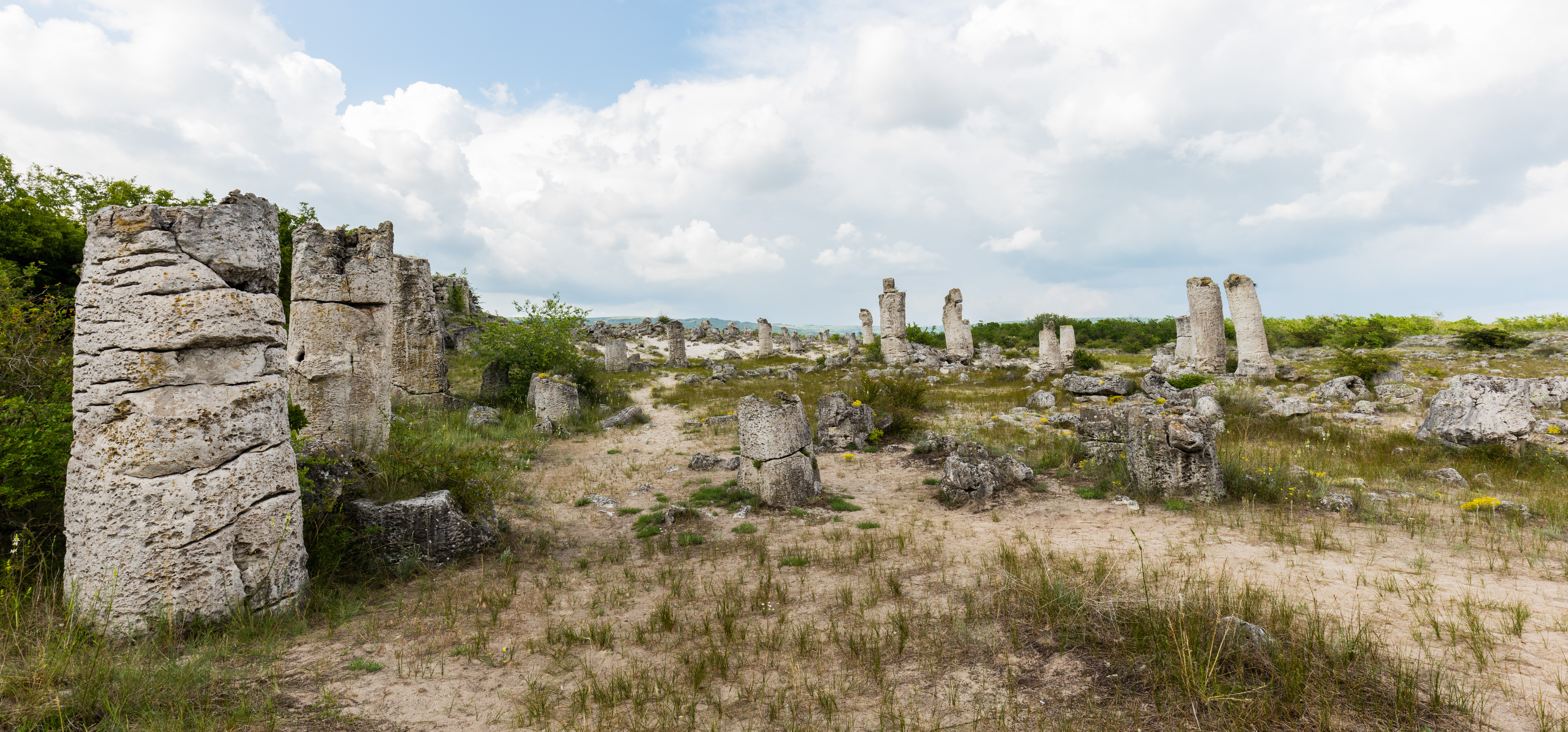

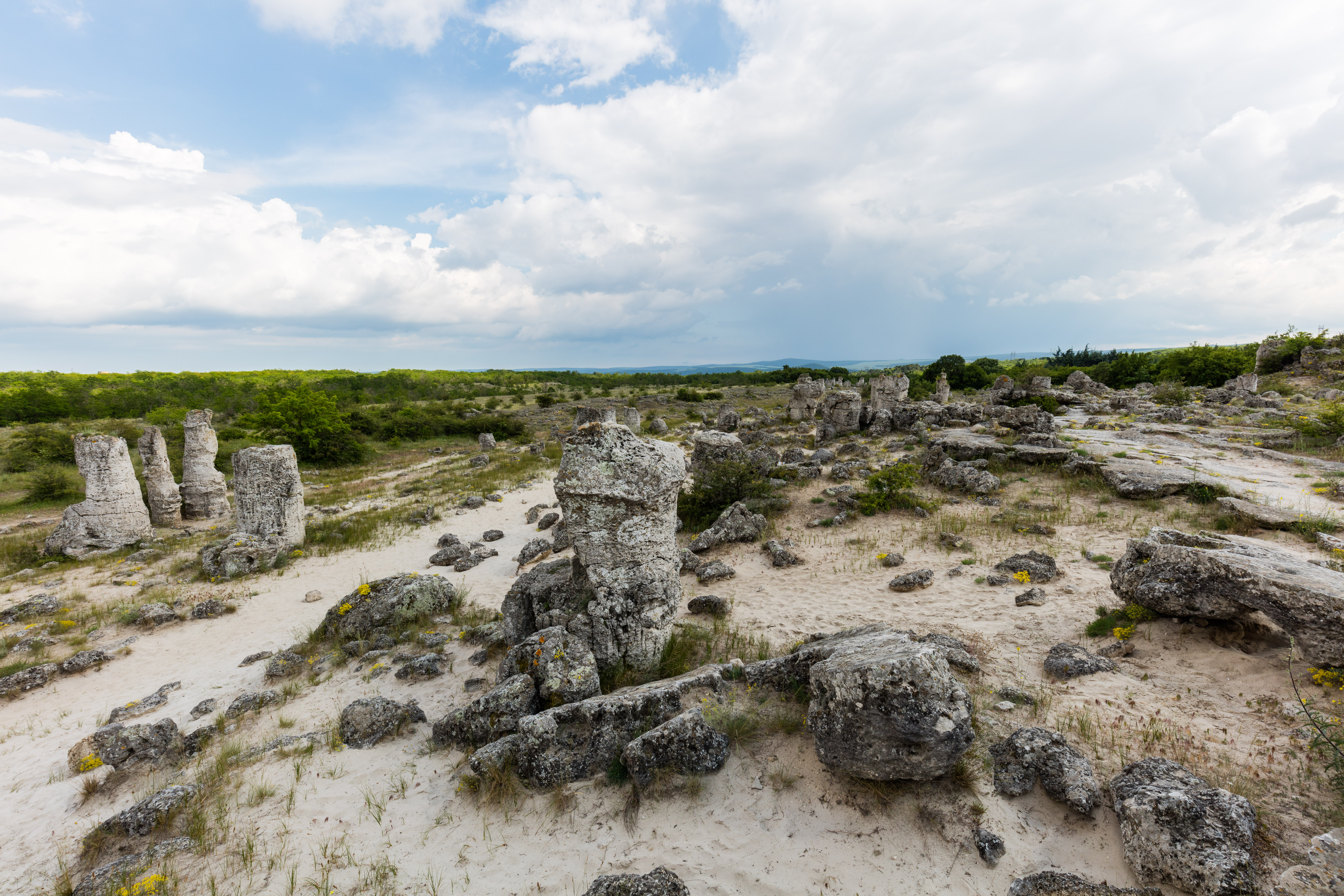
