= Dormition of the Mother of God Cathedral, Varna =

Largest church building in Varna, Bulgaria

Coordinates: 43°12′19″N 27°54′36″E

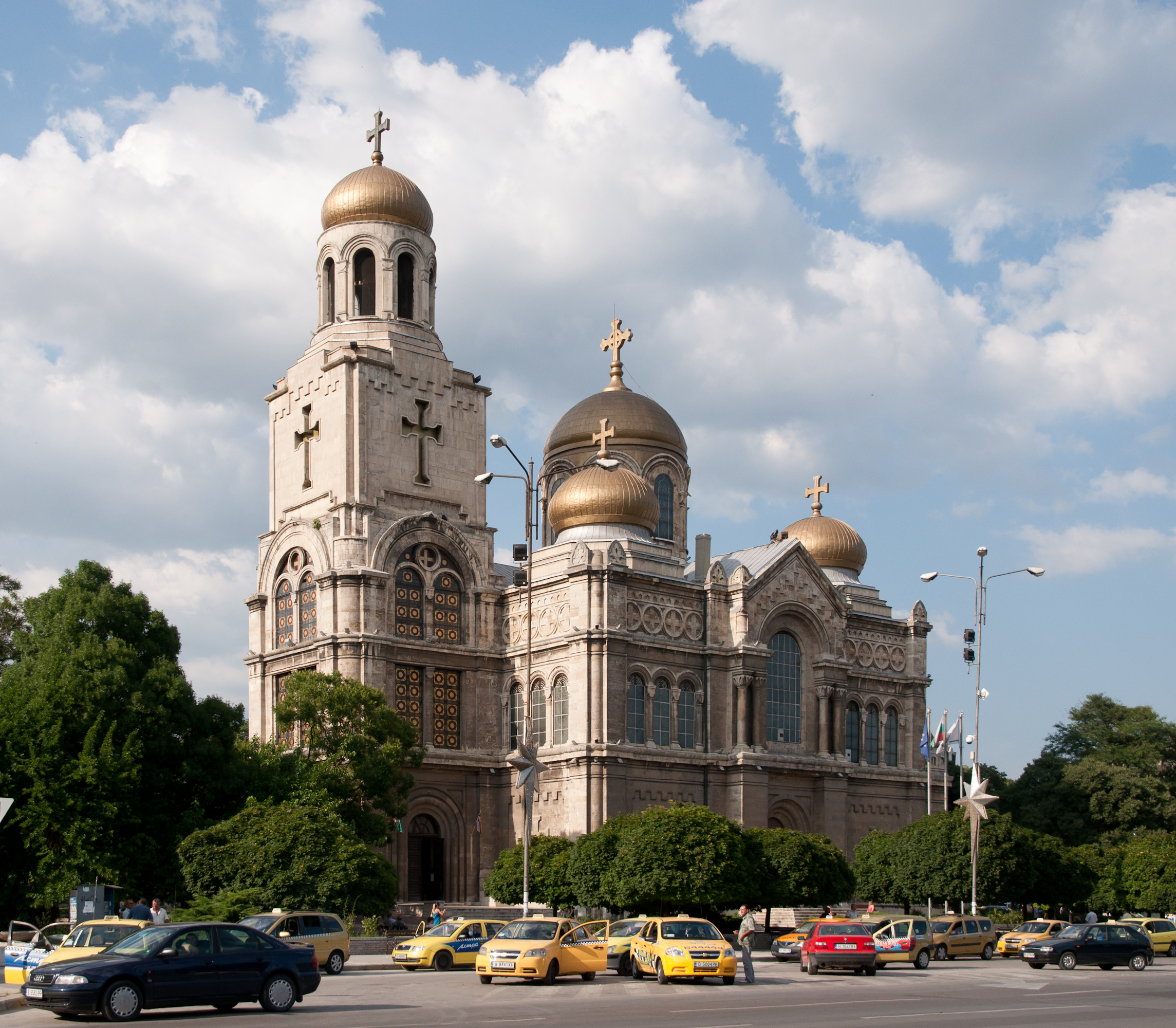
The Dormition of the Mother of God Cathedral

The Dormition of the Mother of God Cathedral (Катедрален храм "Успение Пресвятия Богородици" or Катедрален храм "Успение Богородично", translit. Katedralen hram Uspenie Bogorodichno) is the largest church building in Varna and the third largest cathedral in Bulgaria (after St. Alexander Nevski Cathedral in Sofia and St. Demetrius Cathedral in Vidin). Officially opened on 30 August 1886, it is the residence of the bishopric of Varna and Preslav and one of the symbols of Varna.

== History ==
=== Preparations and planning ===
During Russian Knyaz Dondukov-Korsakov's visit to Varna, he noticed the need for a cathedral church that would suit the needs of the growing city's population of Eastern Orthodox Christians. Metropolitan Simeon gathered the community to elect a commission aimed at preparing the construction of a new church, particularly selecting the spot, raising money and securing timber and building materials. The construction was evaluated at 300–400,000 French francs, most of them expected to be collected by means of voluntary donations. The 15,000 francs that were initially collected were quickly laid out, but the Bulgarian government granted a sum of 100,000 leva and a lottery of 150,000 2-lev tickets was run.

Primarily materials from the vicinity of Varna were used for the construction of the cathedral. Stones from the destroyed fortified walls of the city were collected, material for the façade was brought from the neighbouring villages of Lyuben Karavelovo and Kumanovo, the inner columns were made of local stone. The outer columns under the windows used stone from Rousse and the arches relied on limy freestone. Copper plates for the roof, as well as elevating gear to lift the blocks of stone, were brought from England.

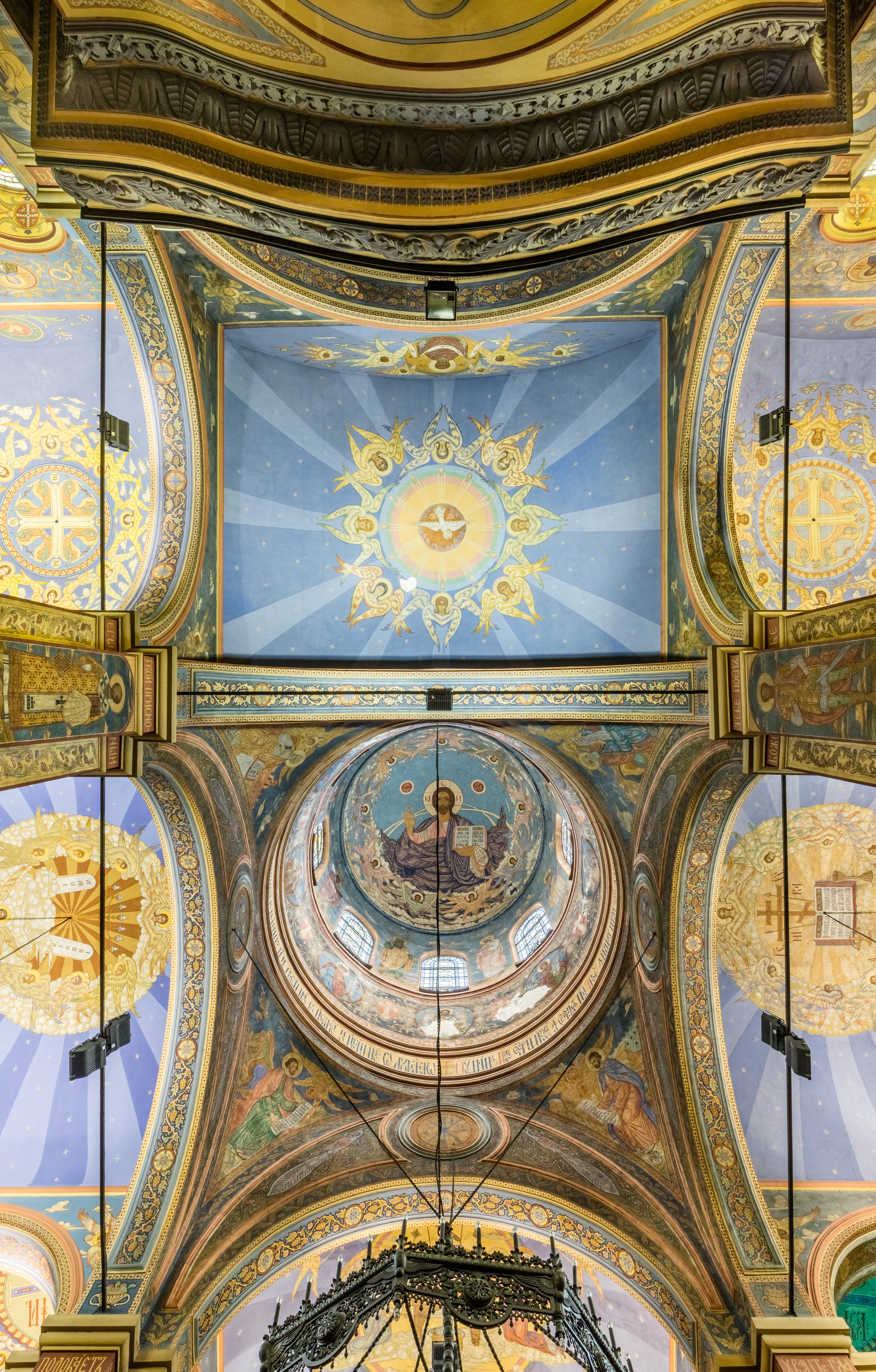
Top view.

The foundation stone was laid by Bulgarian Knyaz Alexander on 22 August 1880 after a solemn ceremony and prayer in front of a crowd of Bulgarians and Armenians. The Knyaz gave amnesty to all the local prisoners that had three months or less left to spend in prison.

The name that was chosen, Dormition of the Theotokos, was in memory of Russian Empress consort Maria Alexandrovna, a benefactress of Bulgaria and aunt of the Bulgarian knyaz, who had recently died.

The initially selected spot was not liked by the knyaz, who preferred a location on a hill in the then-outskirts of the city, where a garden could also be arranged and so that the cathedral could be seen from the whole city.

=== Construction ===
The project for the cathedral, modelled after the temple in the Peterhof Palace, was by an Odesan architect by the name of Maas. Construction began immediately after the foundation stone was laid and took six years. Initially, the local government concluded a 6,000-leva contract with the architect, but he soon asked for more resources, so the commission decided to buy his plans but not engage him with the construction. Thus, the foundations were laid after the plan of Maas, whereas the building itself followed the plan of municipal architect P. Kupka.

According to the project, the cathedral is a three-naved cross-domed basilica featuring two aisles and sized of 35 by 35 m, with the main altar being dedicated to the Dormition of the Theotokos, the north one to Saint Alexander Nevsky and the south one to Saint Nicholas the Miracle Worker.

The issue of selecting a master builder was discussed in the summer of 1880, but the negotiations with Kolyu Ficheto from Tarnovo proved unsuccessful. Local master Vasil Ivanov was given the temporary guidance, the job was however was assigned to Yanko Kostandi after a long search. On 15 March 1884, the commission entrusted Gencho Kanchev from Tryavna with the task. The temple was erected in the following year, the roof was finished in September and the first church service was given on 30 August 1886.

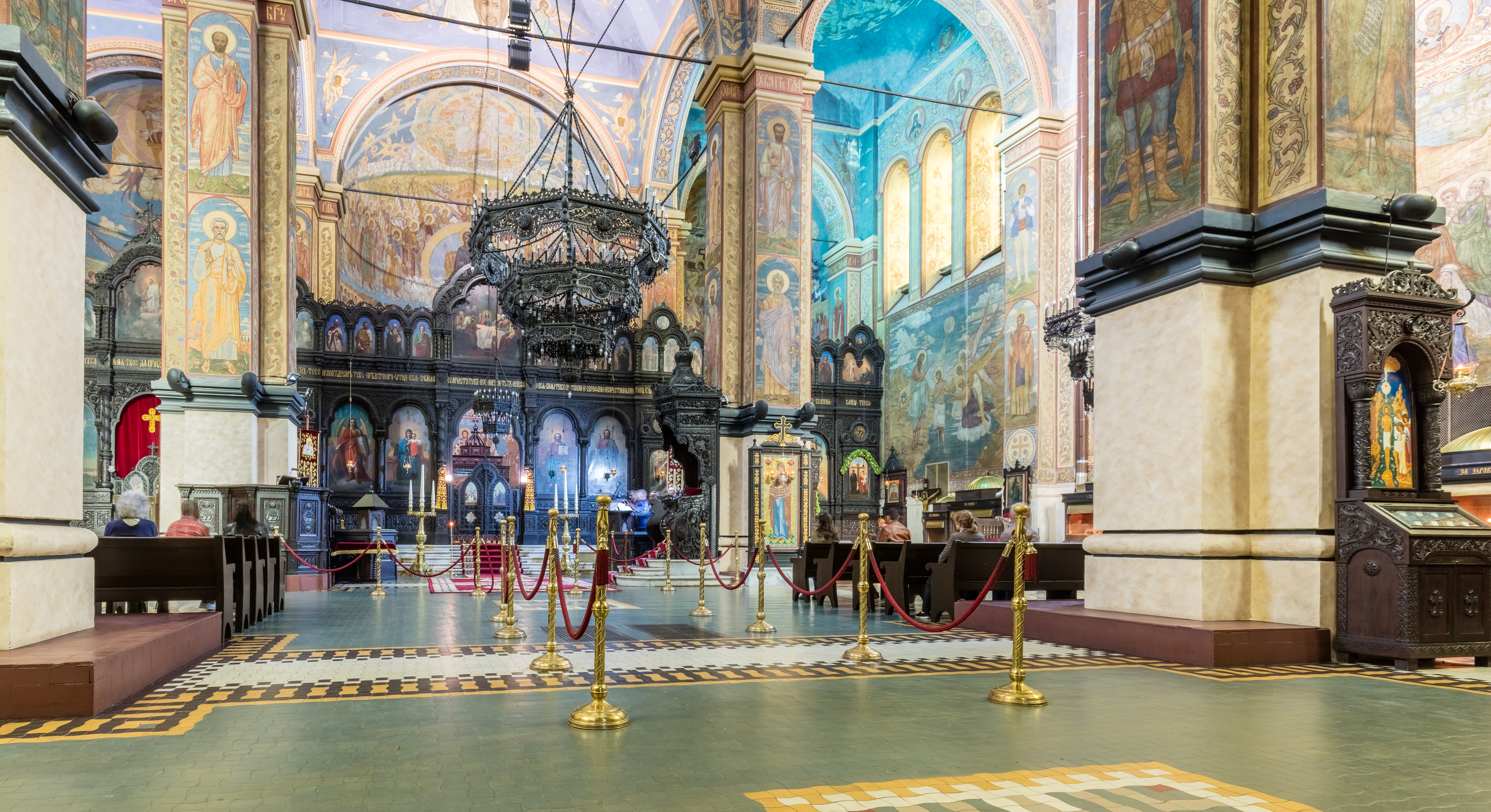
View of the interior.

=== Furnishing ===
The furnishing of the interior, however, also continued in the following years. The bishop's throne, the work of Niko Mavrudi, was placed in 1897 and the iconostasis was manufactured later by master Ivan Filipov from Debar. It was decided that a new and separate bell tower would not be erected and instead a dome would be lifted and a part of the original building adapted for the purpose. The bell was supposed to weigh 100 poods (1.6 tons) and bear the inscription "In honour of the Liberator". 42 small and 3 large icons were brought from Russia as a donation by Nicholas II in 1901, additional 8 intended for the middle and north doors following in 1904. The church's floor was covered with ceramic tiles of different colours in 1911 and the balcony was finished four years later.

The 38 m-high belfry was fully erected between 1941 and 1943 by architect Stefan Venedict Popow, the domes took their current appearance in the period, steam heating was installed and the construction of the roof was changed as well. It was initially very hard to find a contractor to sponsor the repairs, as well as the securing and transportation of materials. The decoration of the Dormition of the Theotokos Cathedral began after 1949 under Professor N. Rostovtsev, who donated the narthex murals. The chandeliers that were then installed were the work of woodcarver P. Kushlev.

The large painted windows were installed in the 1960s. Saints Cyril and Methodius are depicted on the larger south ones (looking towards the square), while the north ones portray St Angelarius and St Clement of Ohrid.

The copper domes, damaged by patina, were reconstructed and gilded in the spring of 2000. The façade was renovated the same year.

== References and sources ==
- Katedralen hram "Uspenie Presvyatiya Bogoroditsi". Varna.info.bg. Accessed 19 March 2006.
