= Varna Province =

Province in eastern Bulgaria

Varna Province Област Варна
- Province
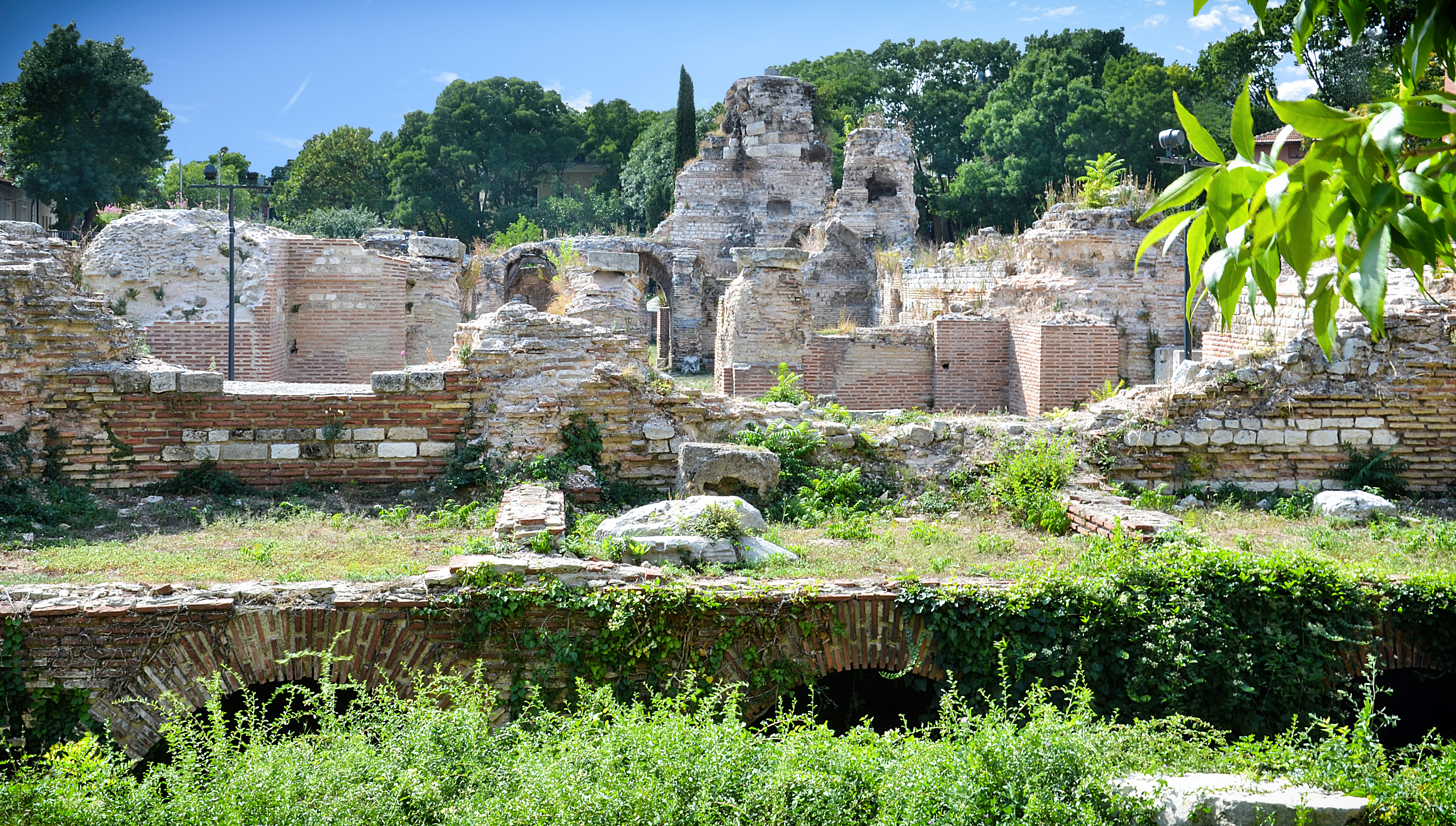
- Ancient Roman Baths in Varna Province

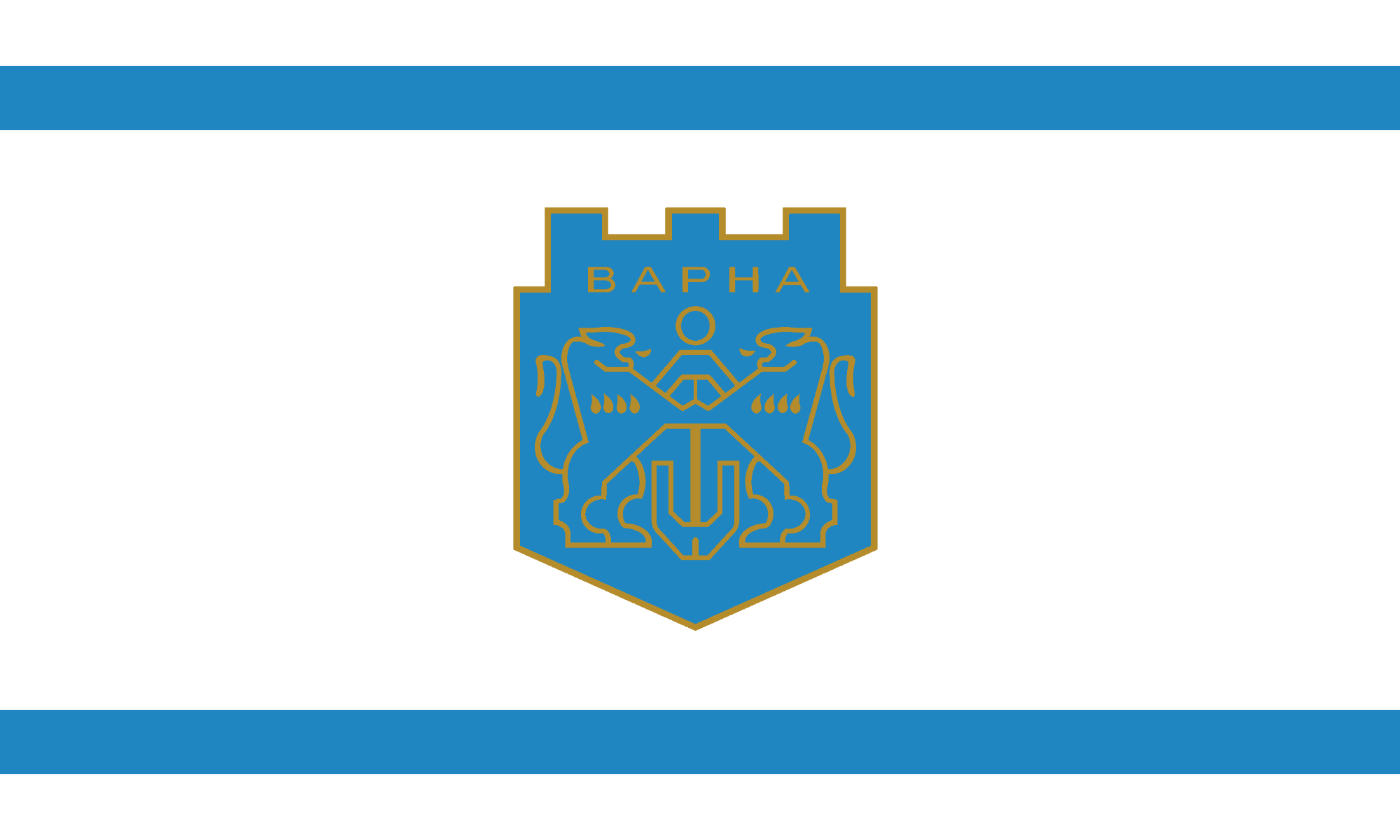
- Flag

- Location of Varna Province in Bulgaria
- Coordinates: 43°12′N 27°36′E
- Country: Bulgaria
- Capital: Varna
- Municipalities: 12

Government
  - Governor: Prof. Andriyana Andreeva

Area
  - Total: 3,819.5 km^{2} (1,474.7 sq mi)

Population (December 2022)
  - Total: 416,813
  - Density: 109.13/km^{2} (282.64/sq mi)
- Time zone: UTC+2 (EET)
  - Summer (DST): UTC+3 (EEST)
- License plate: B
- Website: varnaregion.egov.bg

Varna Province (Bulgarian: Област Варна, romanized: Oblast Varna), formerly known as Varna okrug, is a province in eastern Bulgaria, one of the 28 Bulgarian provinces. It comprises 12 municipalities (Note: общини, obštini, sing.; община, obština) with a population of 494,216 as of April 2016. The province is named after its administrative centre, Varna.

== Geography ==
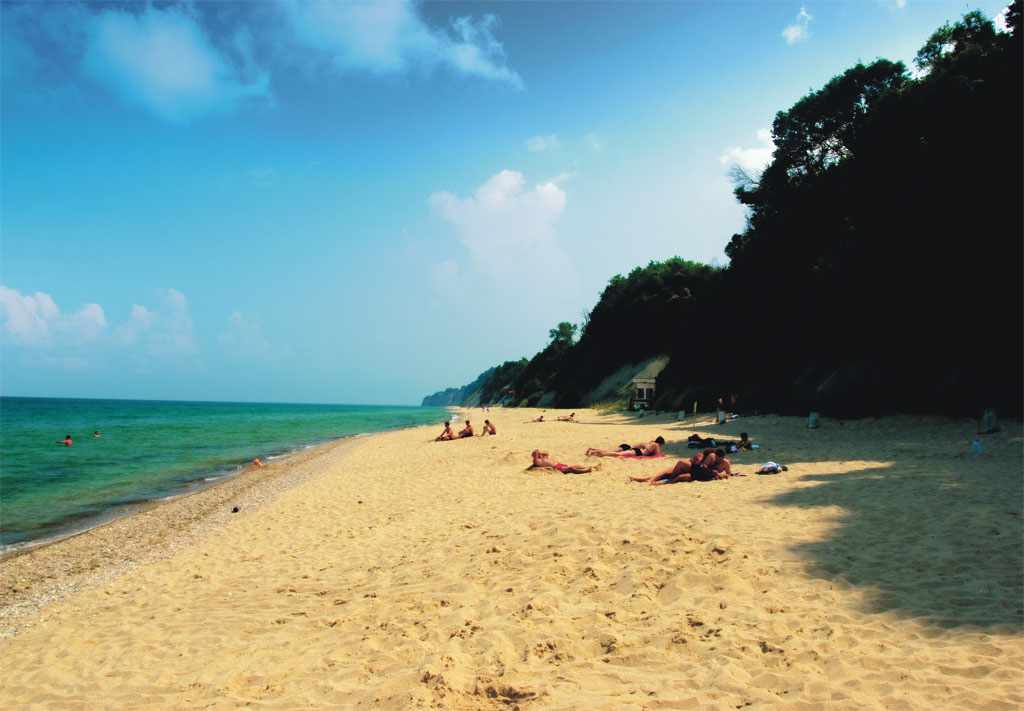
One of Byala's beaches

The province's territory is 3,819.5 km^{2}. It borders the Black Sea and covers parts of the hilly Danubian Plain (including parts of the Franga Plateau, South Dobruja, the Provadiya Plateau, Ludogorie, and the Avren Plateau), Eastern Stara Planina, the Varna–Devnya valley with the lakes (limans) of Varna and Beloslav, and the Kamchiya river valley. Other rivers include Provadiya, Devnya, and Batova, and the largest artificial lake is Tsonevo.

The Black Sea coast is hilly and verdant, mostly cliff, with a couple of rocky headlands (Cape Galata, Cape St. Athanasius), several expansive sand beaches, the largest of which, at the mouths of the rivers Kamchiya and Shkorpilovska, is nearly 13 km (8.1 mi) long and up to 200–300 m wide, and many small cove beaches. Agricultural lands cover 60% of the area, with fertile chernozem soils mostly in the north and west; forests—28.1% (with some of the oldest oak massives in the nation), mostly in the south; and urban zones—6.8%.

Natural resources include large deposits of rock salt, limestone, silica, and clays, all extensively used in local chemical, cement and glass manufacturing and construction; silica is also exported. Significant deposits of medicinal fango (mineral mud) are found in Lake Varna. The province abounds in thermal mineral waters. There are natural gas reserves. The offshore Galata gas field, a relatively minor project with planned cumulative production of 2 billion cubic meters, is expected to provide up to 15% of the nation's gas consumption for its lifetime. Manganese ore deposits are found.

The climate inland is temperate, with cold, damp winters and hot, dry summers, and akin to Mediterranean along the Black Sea coast, with milder winters and cooler summers.

=== Environment ===
Environment in Varna Province is subject to strict national and international protection, due to its vulnerability and international significance.

==== Reserves ====
- Kamchiya Biosphere Reserve (UNESCO-listed) (Dolni Chiflik, Avren)
- Valchi prehod (Dolni Chiflik)
- Kirov dol (Dolni Chiflik)
- Varbov dol (Dalgopol)
- Kalfata (Dalgopol)

==== National parks ====
- Golden Sands Nature Park (Varna, Aksakovo, Balchik (Dobrich Province))

==== Protected areas ====
- Rakitnika (Varna)
- Petricha (Beloslav)
- Slaveikova gora (Provadiya)
- Yatata (Beloslav)
- Tulumova peshtera (Dalgopol)
- Vodenitsite (Dalgopol)
- Aladzha Monastery (Varna)
- Snezhinska koriya (Provadiya)
- Vodenitsite (Dalgopol)
- Orlov kamak (Dolni Chiflik)
- Gorska baraka (Dolni Chiflik)
- Pobiti Kamani (Beloslav, Aksakovo)
- Liman (Avren)
- Pregrada (Dalgopol)
- Kazashko (Varna)
- Golyamata kanara (Vetrino)
- Kamchiyski pyasatsi (Dolni Chiflik)

==== Nature landmarks ====
- Gorna i Dolna Kapladzha (Beloslav)
- Slyapoto kladenche (Beloslav)
- Byal oman (Dolni Chiflik)
- Urumovo lale (Suvorovo)
- Kuza skoka waterfall (Dalgopol)
- Sini vir waterfall (Dalgopol)
- Chudnite Skali rock phenomenon (Dalgopol)

==== Coastal resorts, beaches, and locales ====
- Frenkliman
- Panorama
- Golden Sands
- Holiday Club Riviera
- Chaika
- Kabakum
- Sunny Day
- Constantine and Helena
- Euxinograd
- Varna
- Asparuhovo
- Galata
- Fichoza (Priboi)
- Chernomorets chalet
- Pasha dere
- Rodni balkani (formerly chalet, currently military base)
- Romantika
- Kamchia
- Kamchiyski pyasatsi
- Shkorpilovtsi
- Mecho uho
- Karadere
- Belite skali
- Byala
- Luna

== Municipalities ==
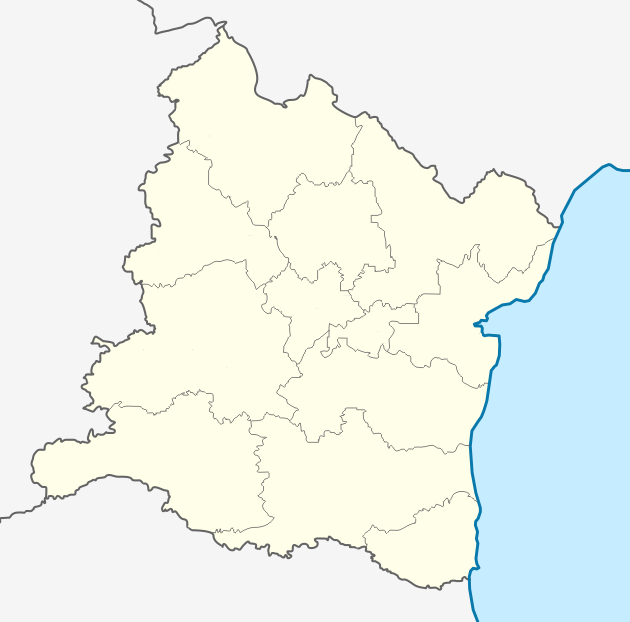

The Varna province—or oblast—contains 12 municipalities (Bulgarian: община, romanized: obština, plural: общини, obštini). The following table shows the names of each municipality in English and Cyrillic, the main town (in bold) or village, and the population of each in December 2009.

Municipality	Cyrillic	Pop.	Town/Village	Pop.
Aksakovo	Аксаково	21,919	**Aksakovo**	7,897
Avren	Аврен	9,089	Avren	750
Beloslav	Белослав	11,257	**Beloslav**	7,937
Byala	Бяла	3,729	**Byala**	2,171
Dolni Chiflik	Долни чифлик	19,316	**Dolni Chiflik**	6,706
Devnya	Девня	9,234	**Devnya**	8,383
Dalgopol	Дългопол	14,364	**Dalgopol**	4,829
Provadia	Провадия	23,045	**Provadia**	12,901
Suvorovo	Суворово	7,544	**Suvorovo**	4,723
Valchi Dol	Вълчи дол	11,093	**Valchi Dol**	3,460
Varna	Варна	329,173	**Varna**	320,837
Vetrino	Ветрино	5,702	Vetrino	1,036

== Demographics ==
Historical population
Year	Pop.	±%
1946	266,733	—
1956	314,214	+17.8%
1965	366,855	+16.8%
1975	431,024	+17.5%
1985	464,807	+7.8%
1992	462,970	−0.4%
2001	462,013	−0.2%
2011	475,074	+2.8%
2021	432,198	−9.0%
Source: pop-stat.mashke.org

In late 2009, the population of the province, announced by the Bulgarian National Statistical Institute, numbered 465,465 of which 21.6% are inhabitants over 60 years old. 320,837 (68.83%) live in the city of Varna, and 379,844 (81.61%) in urban areas (national average 70%). Population density (121.85 per km^{2}) is significantly higher than the national average (70). The birth, marriage, and divorce rates are also higher; the death rate and the unemployment rate (7.34%, 2005) are lower. 71.1% of the population are of working age; above working age are 14.8%.

=== Ethnic groups ===
Ethnic groups in Varna Province (2011 census)
Ethnic group	Percentage
Bulgarians	87.3%
Turks	7.2%
Romani	3.2%
others and indefinable	2.3%

Total population (2011 census): 475,074

Ethnic groups (2011 census): Identified themselves: 424 893 persons:

- Bulgarians: 371,048 (87.33%)
- Turks: 30,469 (7.17%)
- Romani: 13,432 (3.16%)
- Others and indefinable: 9,944 (2.34%)

A further 50,000 persons in Varna Province did not declare their ethnic group at the 2011 census.

Ethnic groups according to the 2001 census, when 462 013 people of the population of 462,013 of Varna Province identified themselves (with percentage of total population):

- Bulgarians: 393,884
- Turks: 37,502
- Romani: 15,462

The ethnic composition at the 2001 census included Bulgarians—85.3%; Turks—8.1%; Romani—3.4% (there are a few mostly Roma-populated villages such as Lyuben Karavelovo in Aksakovo municipality—inhabited by Boyash of the Kopanari subgroup); Armenians—0.6%; Russians—0.3% (including about 340 Cossacks in the Lipovan village of Kazashko); and smaller numbers of Ukrainians, Jews, Greeks, Crimean Tatars, Circassians, Vlachs, and others. There is a growing number of western expatriates and new Chinese, Arab and other immigrants.

Several rural villages in the municipalities of Aksakovo, Suvorovo, and Valchidol, as well as the Vinitsa district of Varna, have historically been populated mostly by Gagauz.

=== Religion ===
Religions in Varna Province (2011 census)
Religious group	Percentage
Orthodox Christian	59.59%
Muslim	4.32%
Protestant Christian	0.59%
Roman Catholic Christian	0.33%
others and indefinable	35.13%

Religious adherence in the province according to 2001 census:

Census 2001
religious adherence	population	%
Orthodox Christians	394,357	85.36%
Muslims	45,672	9.89%
Protestants	1,395	0.30%
Roman Catholics	749	0.16%
Other	3,296	0.71%
Religion not mentioned	16,544	3.58%
total	462,013	100%

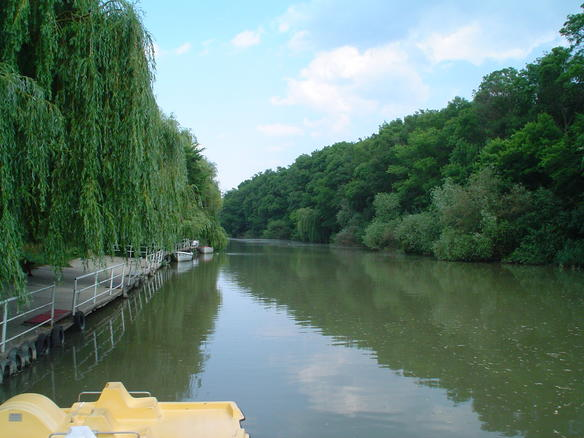
River Kamchiya

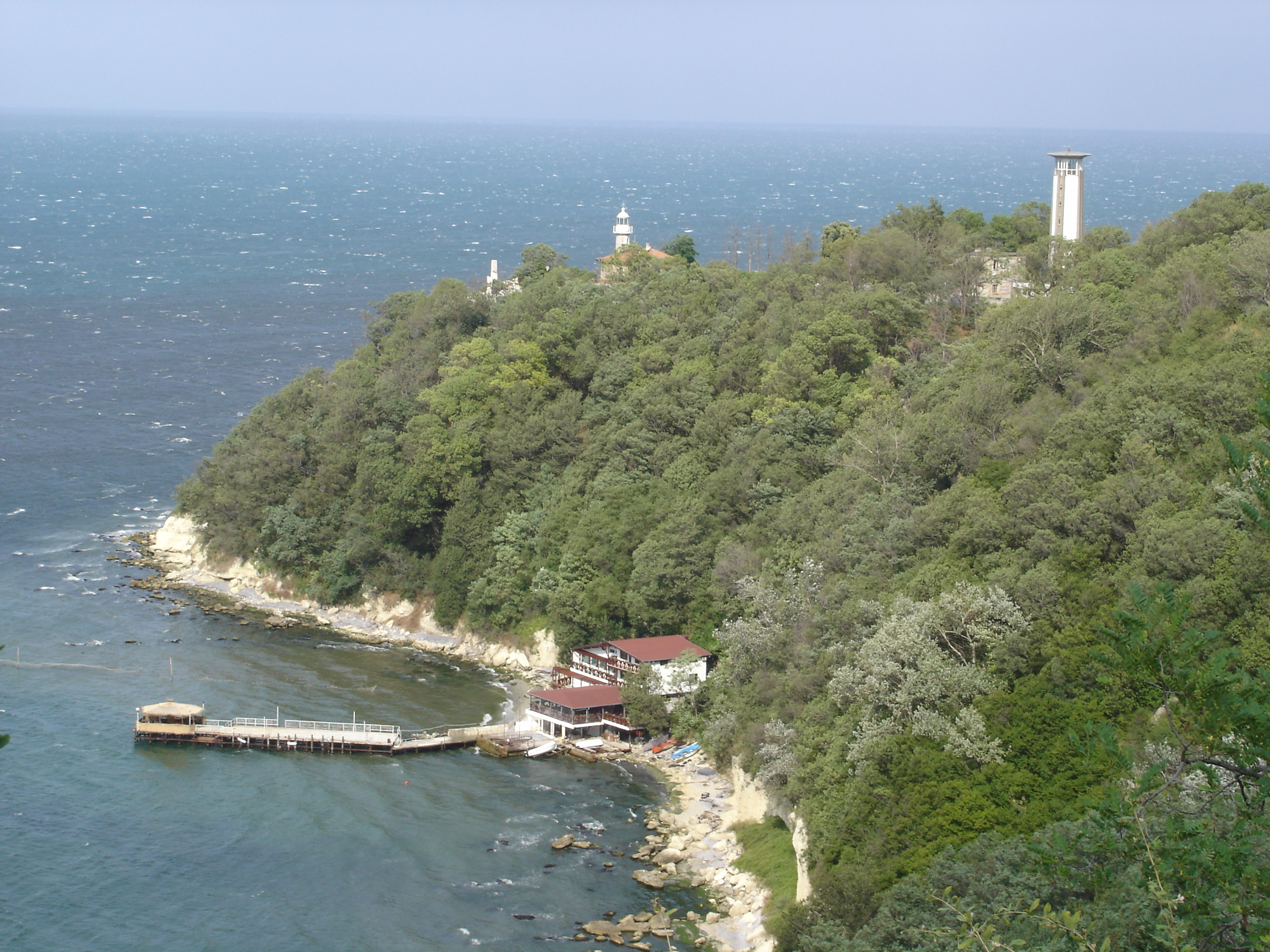
Cape Galata

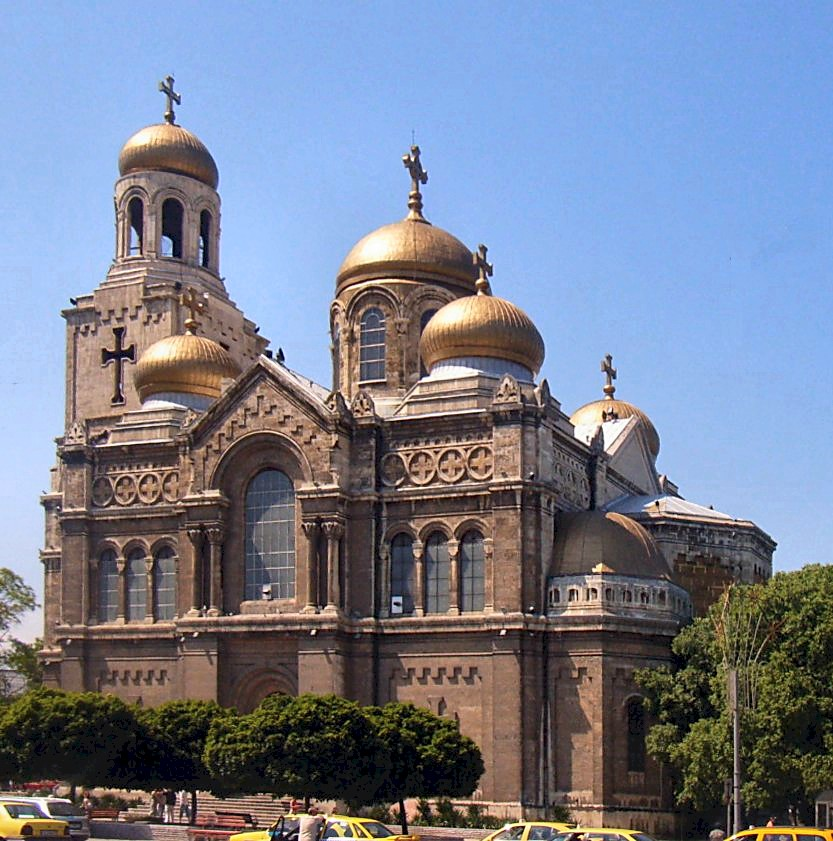
Varna

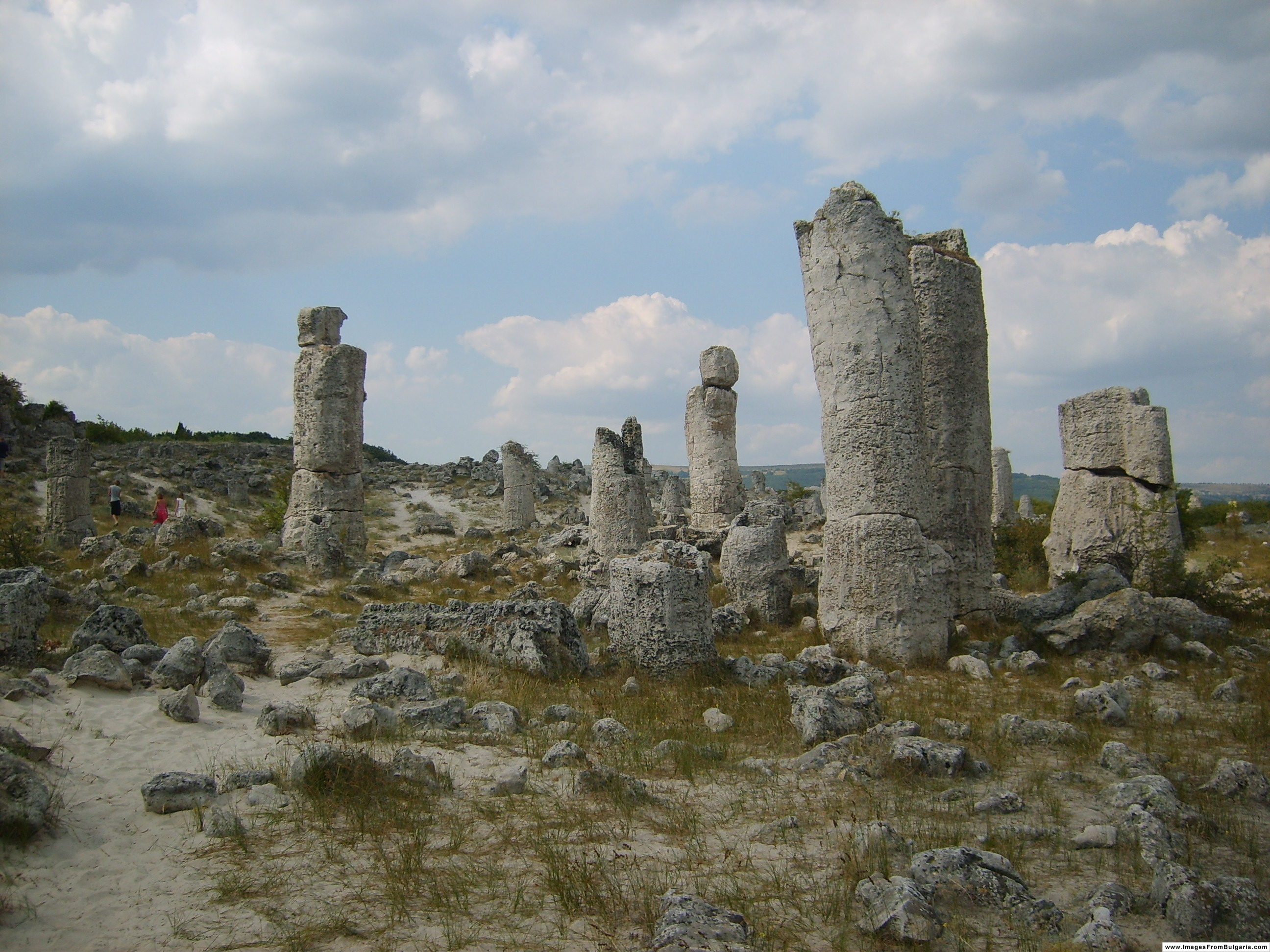
Pobiti Kamani

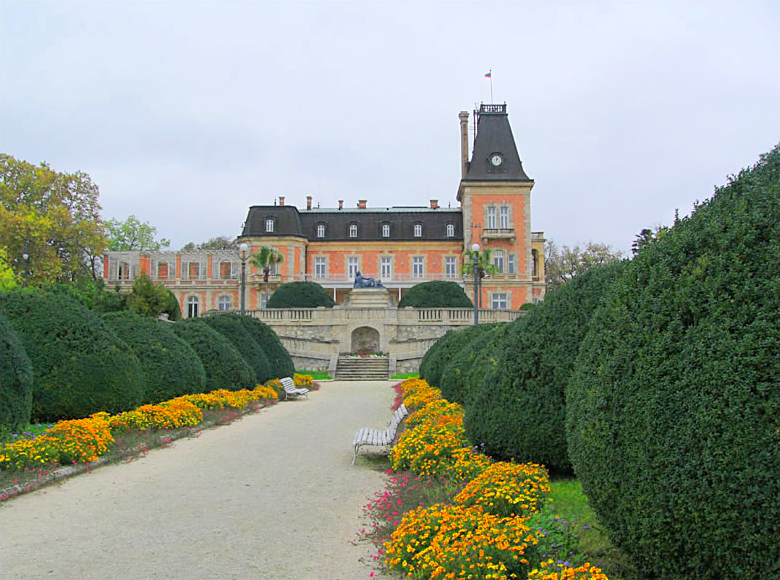
Euxinograd

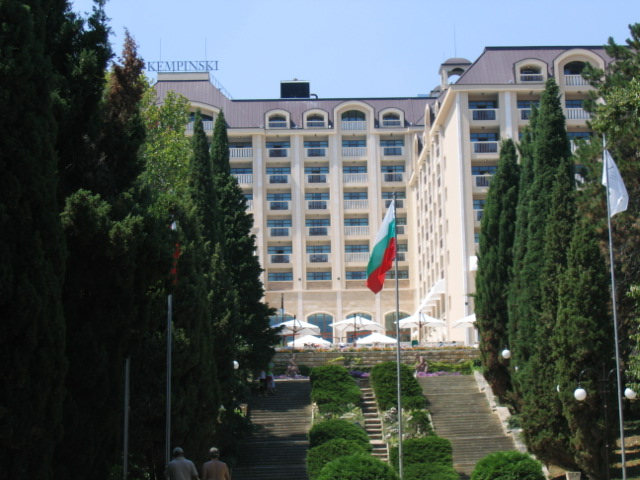
Golden Sands

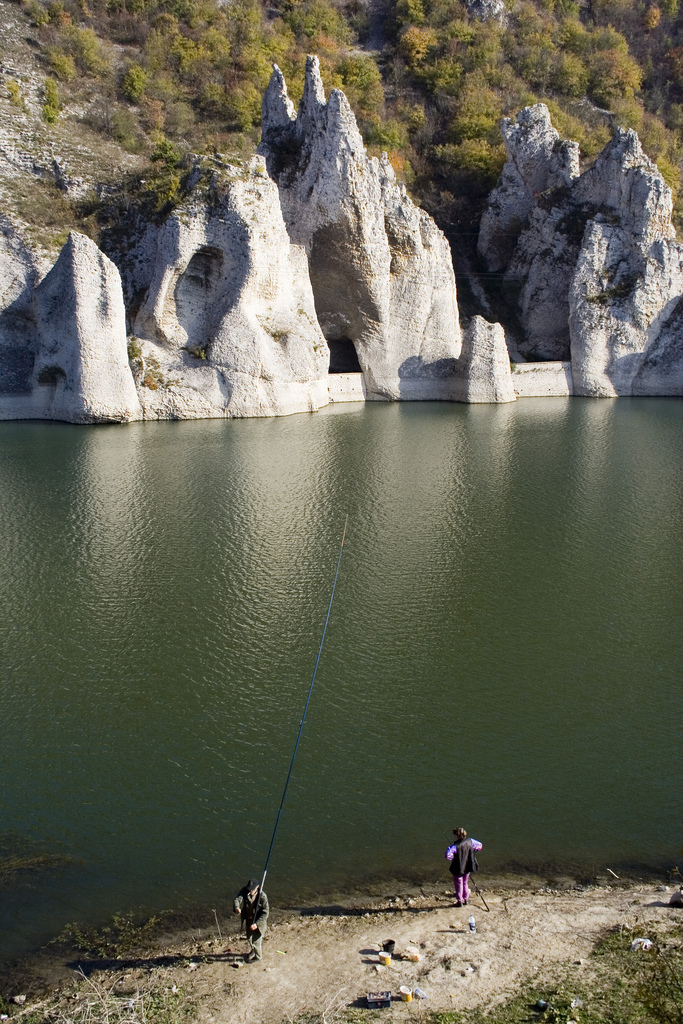
Chudnite Skali on Lake Tsonevo

== History ==
The area has been populated at least since the Neolith and was a major centre of an Eneolithic culture with unique skills in metallurgy and seafaring, with a developed social structure and religion (see Varna Necropolis, site of arguably the oldest man-made gold treasure in the world). Solnitsata, the earliest known European town, was in what is today Varna Province.

By the first millennium BC, it was inhabited by Thracians who dominated it throughout classical antiquity; by the end of the period they were largely Romanized. In the 6th century BC, an ancient Greek trading colony (apoikia), Odessos (Varna), was founded, becoming an enduring contact zone between Thracians and Greeks. In the 4th century, the province was included in the empire of Philip II, Alexander the Great and his diadochus Lysimachus.

By the first century AD, it was conquered by the Roman Empire. Under Emperor Diocletian, Marcianopolis (Devnya) became the centre of the Roman province of Moesia Secunda of the Diocese of Thrace. During Emperor Valens' wars with the Goths (366-369), this city was temporary capital of the empire. Both Marcianopolis and Odessus (the Roman name of Odessos) were major early Christian centres. It is believed that Saint Andrew founded the local Christian church and his disciple Ampliatus served as bishop at Odessus.

In the 6th century, Slavs' migrations altered the ethnic composition of the then Byzantine province. Between 680 and 681, it became the heartland of the First Bulgarian Empire, whose capital was perhaps initially near Varna, before it moved to Pliska. Two of the most significant scriptoria of the Preslav Literary School were at Ravna (near Provadiya) and Varna.

The latter two cities were major fortresses and trade emporia of the Second Bulgarian Empire as well. The peasant war of Ivailo in the late 13th century started from the region, which at the time was plagued by Tatar raids and was finally subdued by the Ottomans in 1389. In 1444, the Battle of Varna was fought, as were several ground and naval battles of the Russo-Turkish wars of the 18th and 19th century.

Under the Ottomans, the population became extremely diverse, with significant number of Turks and other Muslim peoples arriving from Asia Minor, the steppes north of the Black Sea, and the Caucasus, along with Orthodox Christian Gagauz, Armenians, and Sephardic Jews from Thessaloniki. Many Bulgarians from the region were forcibly relocated to Asia Minor and, in the wake of the Russo-Turkish wars, up to 250,000 eastern Bulgarians were transferred to Russian Bessarabia and Crimea.

Compact Bulgarian population persisted throughout the Provadiya Plateau, Devnya Valley, and Eastern Stara Planina. Villagers from places such as Chenge (modern Asparuhovo, municipality of Dalgopol), Gulitsa (modern Golitsa, municipality of Dolni Chiflik), and neighbouring Erkech (modern Kozichino, Burgas Province) later colonized and returned the Bulgarian ethnic character to dozens of villages throughout northeastern and southeastern Bulgaria, including much of Varna province.

After the liberation of 1878, with the exodus of most Turks and Greeks and the migrations of Bulgarians from other parts of Bulgaria, mostly Stara Planina, as well as North Dobruja, Asia Minor, Bessarabia, and later from Macedonia and Eastern Thrace, ethnic diversity gradually gave way to Bulgarian predominance.

One of the versions of a folk song, inspired by the Ruse blood wedding, can be heard in the province.

== Economy ==
The province is second only to Sofia in foreign direct investment; its GDP per capita is higher and its unemployment is the lowest in the country. Per capita income is fifth highest in the nation (2007). The economy is service-oriented; it was responsible for over 30% of the nation's revenue in tourism (2004). (See the list of coastal resorts, beaches, and locales below.)

It is an important communications and transportation hub with the Port of Varna on the Black Sea and inland waterways, the International Airport of Varna, the Varna railway ferry terminal, parts of several railway lines (including the oldest one in Bulgaria, Rousse-Varna, opened 1866) and junctions (Sindel, Razdelna, Komunari), and portions of two of the nation's motorways (Haemus and Cherno More). Varna is the easternmost destination of Pan-European transport corridor 8 and is closely connected to corridors 7 and 9 via Rousse.

In June 2007, Eni and Gazprom disclosed the South Stream project whereby a 900 km-long offshore natural gas pipeline from Russia's Dzhubga with annual capacity of 30 billion cubic meters is planned to come ashore possibly at Pasha dere, near the Galata offshore gas field, en route to Italy and Austria.

Manufacturing is concentrated mostly in the Varna-Devnya Industrial Complex and Provadiya. Agriculture (notably wheat, fruit, wineries) and forestry are also of economic significance.

The province is a major education and international culture centre with five universities, several other higher learning and research institutions, museums, performing arts institutions, and hosted international events.

Real estate has been booming over the last few years in Varna and rural villages near the coast and inland. "English villages" of Britons settling in Bulgaria emerged in the rural countryside at Avren, Banovo (municipality of Suvorovo), and General Kantardzhievo (municipality of Aksakovo), among others.

== Towns and villages ==
- Aksakovo Municipality includes the towns of Aksakovo and Ignatievo and the villages of Botevo, Dobrogled, Dolishte, General Kantardzhievo, Izvorsko, Kichevo, Klimentovo, Krumovo, Kumanovo, Lyuben Karavelovo, Novakovo, Oreshak, Osenovo, Pripek, Radevo, Slanchevo, Vaglen, Voditsa, Yarebichna, Zasmyano, and Zornitsa;
- Avren Municipality includes the villages of Avren, Benkovski, Bliznatsi, Bolyartsi, Dobri Dol, Dabravino, Kazashka Reka, Kitka, Krusha, Priseltsi, Ravna Gora, Sadovo, Sindel, Trastikovo, Tsarevtsi, Yunak, and Zdravets;
- Beloslav Municipality includes the town of Beloslav and the villages of Ezerovo, Strashimirovo, and Razdelna;
- Byala Municipality, includes the town of Byala and the villages of Dyulino, Goritsa, Gospodinovo, Popovich, and Samotino;
- Dalgopol Municipality includes the town of Dalgopol and the villages of Arkovna, Asparuhovo, Boryana, Kamen Dyal, Komunari, Krasimir, Lopushna, Medovets, Partizani, Polyatsite, Royak, Sava, Sladka Voda, Tsonevo, and Velichkovo,
- Devnya Municipality includes the town of Devnya and the villages of Kipra and Padina;
- Dolni Chiflik Municipality includes the town of Dolni Chiflik and the villages of Bardarevo, Bulair, Detelina, Golitsa, Goren Chiflik, Grozdyovo, Krivini, Nova Shipka, Novo Oryahovo, Pchelnik, Rudnik, Solnik, Staro Oryahovo, Shkorpilovtsi, Venelin, and Yunets;
- Provadia Municipality includes the town of Provadiya and the villages of Barzitsa, Blaskovo, Bozveliysko, Chayka, Cherkovna, Chernook, Dobrina, Gradinarovo, Hrabrovo, Kiten, Komarevo, Krivnya, Manastir, Nenovo, Ovchaga, Petrov Dol, Ravna, Slaveykovo, Snezhina, Staroselets, Tutrakantsi, Venchan, Zhitnitsa, and Zlatina;
- Suvorovo Municipality includes the town of Suvorovo and the villages of Banovo, Chernevo, Drandar, Izgrev, Kalimantsi, Levski, Nikolaevka, and Prosechen;
- Valchi Dol Municipality includes the town of Valchi Dol and the villages of Boyana, Brestak, Cherventsi, Dobrotich, Esenitsa, General Kiselovo, General Kolevo, Iskar, Izvornik, Kaloyan, Karamanite, Krakra, Metlichina, Mihalich, Oborishte, Radan Voyvoda, Shtipsko, Stefan Karadzha, Strahil, Voyvodino, and Zvanets;
- Varna Municipality includes the city of Varna and the suburban villages of Kamenar, Kazashko, Konstantinovo, Topoli, and Zvezditsa;
- Vetrino Municipality includes the villages of Belogradets, Dobroplodno, Gabarnitsa, Mlada Gvardiya, Momchilovo, Nevsha, Neofit Rilski, Sredno Selo, Vetrino, and Yagnilo.

== Sights ==
Varna is Bulgaria's third largest city, after Sofia and Plovdiv. The oldest gold (dated 4200–4600 BC) in the world was found near the city. It was an inhabited place long before the Greeks established the colony of Odessos there c. 580 BC. Later, under the Romans and their successors, the Slavs and Bulgarians, Varna became a major port trading with Constantinople, Venice and Dubrovnik.

In 1393 it was captured by the Turks, who made it an important military centre. Nowadays it is the nation's main port for both naval and commercial shipping and, adjacent as it is to the coastal resorts of Constantine and Helena, Riviera, Golden Sands, and Kamchia. Sailors on shore leave in unfamiliar ceremonial uniforms mingle with foreign tourists and locals as they promenade along shady boulevards, lined by dignified 19th- and early 20th-century buildings.

The 19th-century Dormition of the Theotokos Cathedral is an imposing landmark, which contains a finely carved iconostasis and bishop's throne, some interesting murals and stained glass.

The 2nd-century Thermae are the remains of the largest Roman public building in Bulgaria. During this century enough has been revealed by archaeologists to give a good impression of the original layout, though some parts of the building remain hidden under nearby streets. Coming across an extensive ancient building amidst the streets and houses of a modern city is not unusual in Bulgaria and is a delight.

Further from the centre, a monument commemorates the Battle of Varna, which took place in 1444. Here 30,000 crusaders were waiting to sail to Constantinople when they were attacked by 120,000 Turks. The Polish King Ladislaus III was killed in a bold attempt to capture Sultan Murad II. The subsequent retreat foreshadowed Christendom's general retreat before the advancing Ottomans. North of Varna there is a cluster of seaside resorts all with fine sandy beaches but differing in size and style.

Some other places of interest include (by municipality):

- Avren: observatory, Petrich fortress, cave monastery, museum of ethnography in Tsarevtsi
- Aksakovo: Batova chalet park near Dolishte, St. Marina monastery near Krumovo
- Dolni chiflik: museum of ethnography, Sherba state hunting farm (ДДС Шерба) and chalet
- Dalgopol: museum of history, Ovchaga ethnographical village in Asparuhovo, ecopark Vodenitsite in Sladka Voda
- Provadiya: Lambova kashta ethnographical complex, Ovech fortress, ethnographical collections in Dobrina and Manastir
- Suvorovo: museum of history, mosque, Peter Deunov house museum in Nikolaevka
- Valchidol: ski run

See also: Byala, Devnya, Provadiya

== See also ==
- Provinces of Bulgaria
- List of villages in Varna Province
