= Boyana, Varna Province =

Village in Varna, Bulgaria

Coordinates: 43.435°N 27.649°E

Boyana (Bulgarian: Бояна) is a village in Valchi Dol Municipality, Varna Province, Bulgaria.
