= Oreshak =

Oreshak may refer to:

- Oreshak, Lovech Province, Bulgaria
- Oreshak, Varna Province, Bulgaria
- Oreshak Peak, Antarctica
