= Goritsa, Varna Province =

Goritsa Горица
- Village
- Location in Bulgaria
- Coordinates: 42.910°N 27.844°E
- Country: Bulgaria
- Province: Varna Province
- Municipality: Byala Municipality
- Elevation: 190 m (620 ft)

Population (2013-12-31)
  - Total: 104
- Postal code: 9103

Goritsa (Bulgarian: Горица) is a village in eastern Bulgaria. It is located in Byala Municipality, Varna Province.

As of December 2013 the village has a population of 104.
