= Oreshak, Varna Province =

Coordinates: 43°18′5″N 27°54′46″E

Oreshak (Bulgarian: Орешак, translittered as Oreshak) is a village in Aksakovo Municipality in Varna Province, northeastern Bulgaria. It is situated about 11 kilometres (6.8 mi) to the north from Varna and at about 10 kilometres (6.2 mi) from the Black Sea. Most of the inhabitants are either local people who have lived there for a long time, or people from Varna who have moved to Oreshak more recently. There are also some foreigners who have chosen Oreshak for a vacation place. Most of the streets are covered with asphalt, but there are some that covered only with road-metal.

== Transport ==
Buses run from Varna to Oreshak every 1-2 hours. All of them stop in the village of Kichevo, and some of them continue after Oreshak to the village of Osenovo.
