= Gospodinovo, Varna Province =

Gospodinovo Господиново
- Village
- Location in Bulgaria
- Coordinates: 42.898°N 27.771°E
- Country: Bulgaria
- Province: Varna Province
- Municipality: Byala Municipality
- Elevation: 137 m (449 ft)

Population (2015-09-15)
  - Total: 323
- Postal code: 9107
- Area code: 051428

Gospodinovo (Bulgarian: Господиново) is a village in eastern Bulgaria. It is located in the municipality of Byala, Varna Province.

As of September 2015, the village had a population of 323.
