= Izvornik =

Coordinates: 43°28′N 27°21′E

Izvornik (Bulgarian: Изворник) is a village in Valchi Dol Municipality, Varna Province, Bulgaria.
