= Vaglen, Varna Province =

Vaglen Въглен
- Village
- Location within Bulgaria
- Coordinates: 43°18′N 27°51′E
- Country: Bulgaria
- Province: Varna Province
- Municipality: Aksakovo

Government
  - Mayor: Georgi Georgiev Gospodinov

Area
  - Total: 20.398 km^{2} (7.876 sq mi)
- Elevation: 368 m (1,207 ft)

Population (2021)
  - Total: 945
- Time zone: UTC+2 (EET)
  - Summer (DST): UTC+3 (EEST)
- Postal code: 9157
- Area code: 052

Vaglen (Bulgarian: Въглен) is a village in Aksakovo Municipality, in Varna Province, in north-eastern Bulgaria. Its former name was Küyümürlük (Кюмюрлюк). The village is situated on the Frangen Plateau, approximately 9 km from Varna and very close to the village of Yarebichna. Most inhabitants are Vlachs.

== Population ==
Population of Vaglen according to census data:

Population by census year
1934	1946	1956	1965	1975	1985	1992	2001	2011	2021
746	669	548	530	564	646	831	904	1028	945

=== Ethnic composition ===
Population by ethnic group according to the 2011 census:

	Population	Share (%)
Total	1,028	100.00
Bulgarians	721	70.13
Turks	3	0.29
Roma	4	0.38
Others	18	1.75
Not self-identified	6	0.58
Did not respond	275	26.75

== Cultural and natural landmarks ==
The oak forest in the Ala Kapu locality near the village was cut down for timber at the beginning of the 20th century. The village has a church dedicated to St. Prophet Elijah, which was restored in 2009. At the entrance to the village there are two public water fountains (чешми).

== Transport ==
The village is served by bus line 25 from Varna, which runs via Razlon Kamenar to Vaglen and continues to the village of Yarebichna.

== Honours ==
Vaglen Point on Clarence Island, Antarctica is named after the village.
