= Byala Municipality, Varna Province =

Byala Municipality Община Бяла
- Municipality
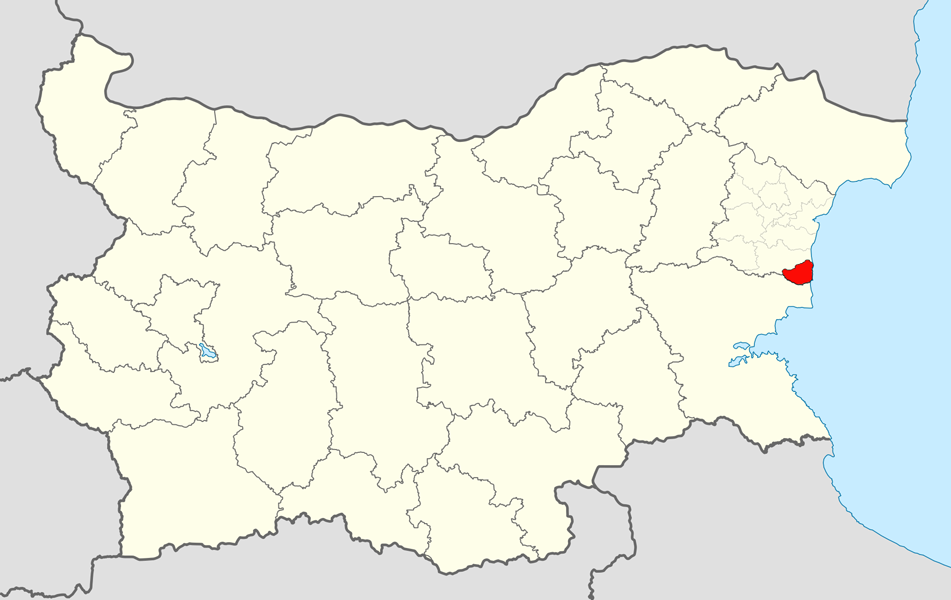
- Byala Municipality within Bulgaria and Varna Province.
- Coordinates: 42°52′N 27°48′E
- Country: Bulgaria
- Province (Oblast): Varna
- Admin. centre (Obshtinski tsentar): Byala

Area
  - Total: 162 km^{2} (63 sq mi)

Population (December 2009)
  - Total: 3,729
  - Density: 23.0/km^{2} (59.6/sq mi)
- Time zone: UTC+2 (EET)
  - Summer (DST): UTC+3 (EEST)

Byala Municipality (Bulgarian: Община Бяла) is a municipality (obshtina) in Varna Province, located in the central part of the Bulgarian Black Sea Coast. It is named after its administrative centre - the town of Byala.

The municipality embraces a territory of 162 km^{2} (63 sq mi) with a population, as of December 2009, of 3,729 inhabitants.

Not to be confused with the municipality of the same name in Ruse Province.

== Settlements ==
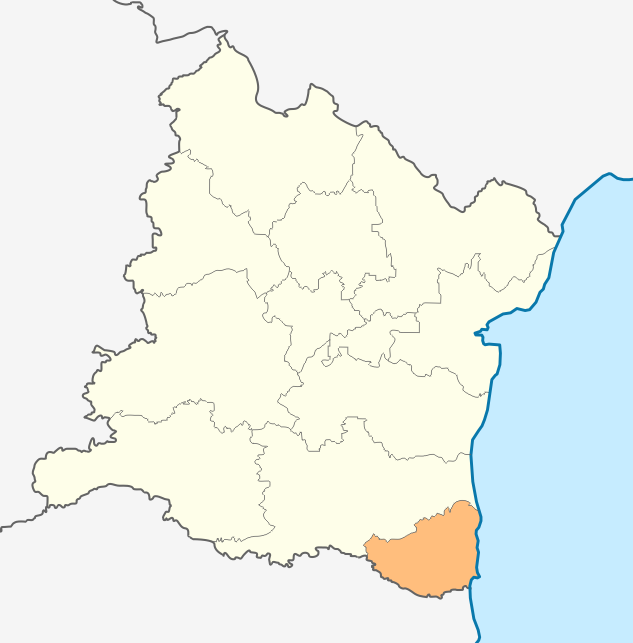
Byala Municipality within Varna Province

Byala Municipality includes the following 6 places (towns are shown in bold):

Town/Village	Cyrillic	Population (December 2009)
**Byala**	**Бяла**	2,171
Goritsa	Горица	140
Gospodinovo	Господиново	373
Dyulino	Дюлино	396
Popovich	Попович	646
Samotino	Самотино	3
Total		3,729

== Demography ==
The following table shows the change of the population during the last four decades.

Byala Municipality
**Year**	1975	1985	1992	**2001**	2005	2007	2009	**2011**
**Population**	4,346	4,065	3,787	3,413	3,349	3,780	3,729	...
Sources: Census 2001, Census 2011, „pop-stat.mashke.org“,

=== Religion ===
According to the latest Bulgarian census of 2011, the religious composition, among those who answered the optional question on religious identification, was the following:

Religious composition of Byala Municipality
Orthodox Christianity	75.3%
Catholicism	0.0%
Protestantism	0.5%
Islam	2.3%
No religion	12.7%
Prefer not to answer, others and indefinable	9.2%

An overwhelming majority of the population of Byala Municipality identify themselves as Christians. At the 2011 census, 75.3% of respondents identified as Orthodox Christians belonging to the Bulgarian Orthodox Church.

== See also ==
- Provinces of Bulgaria
- Municipalities of Bulgaria
- List of cities and towns in Bulgaria
