= Aksakovo Municipality =

Aksakovo Municipality Община Аксаково
- Municipality
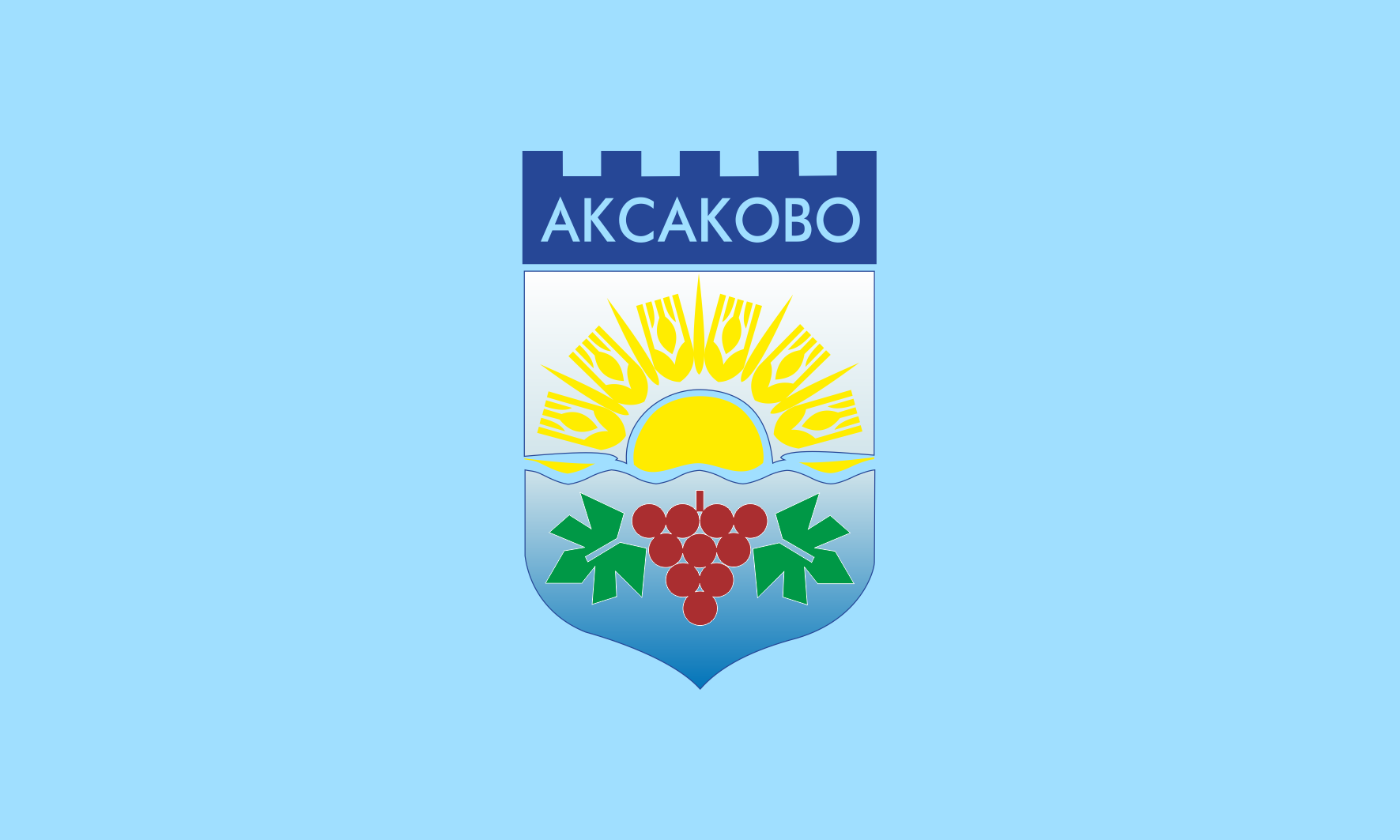
- Flag

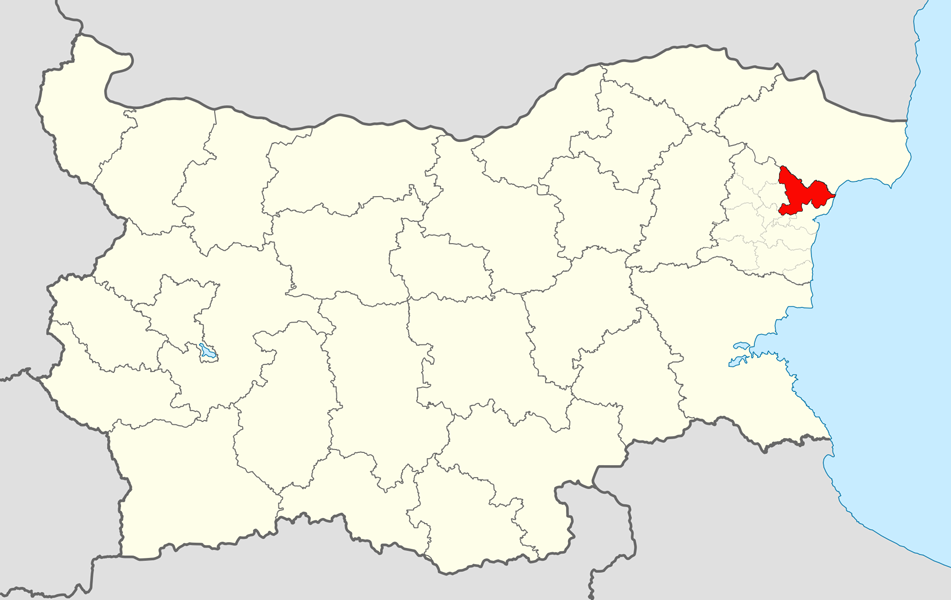
- Aksakovo Municipality within Bulgaria and Varna Province.
- Coordinates: 43°19′N 27°48′E
- Country: Bulgaria
- Province (Oblast): Varna
- Admin. centre (Obshtinski tsentar): Aksakovo

Area
  - Total: 472 km^{2} (182 sq mi)

Population (December 2009)
  - Total: 21,919
  - Density: 46.4/km^{2} (120/sq mi)
- Time zone: UTC+2 (EET)
  - Summer (DST): UTC+3 (EEST)

Aksakovo Municipality (Bulgarian: Община Аксаково) is a municipality (obshtina) in Varna Province, Northeastern Bulgaria, located near the Bulgarian Black Sea Coast. It is named after its administrative centre – the town of Aksakovo.

The municipality has a territory of 472 km^{2} (182 sq mi), bordering the Dobrich Province to the north, with a population of 21,919 inhabitants, as of December 2009. In the southernmost parts of the area is the eastern end of Hemus motorway, which is planned to connect the port of Varna withSofia capital, as well as Varna International Airport.

== General information ==
Municipality Aksakovo is located in the eastern part of the Danube plain, occupies part of the Dobrudja plateau and small part of the valley of river Batova. It has direct access to the Black sea through 4 km stripe between Zlatni Piassatsi resort and Kranevo village. The municipality embraces 23 settlements with center the town of Aksakovo.

The strategic geographic position of Municipality Aksakovo combines transport connections on land, air and water. Through the territory of the municipality passes the highway Haemus connecting Varna with the capital Sofia. Very close are located the ports Varna West – 12 km., Varna East – 8 km. and Ferryboat complex – 6 km.

The civil airport for home and international transport is the second of importance in Bulgaria and is located on the territory of Municipality Aksakovo. In summer time charter flights connect the Airport Varna with all important airports in Europe and Asia.

The most important and constant transport connection is between the municipal center Aksakovo and Varna. By its transport infrastructure Municipality Aksakovo is connected with resort complexes on the north Black sea coast – Zlatni Piassatsi, St. St. Constantine and Helena, Albena, Kranevo and Balchik. Near the municipality /on 6 km./ is located a Ferryboat complex and railway easing the contacts in the region with domestic and international partners.

Aksakovo is located next to tourist summer seaside resorts: St. Constantine and Helena, Zlatni Piassatsi and Albena.

In the municipality territory parts of the nature park Zlatni Piassatsi, nature park Pobiti kamani and the area Batova are included.

Fully reconstructed and restored churches meet locals and guests from the country and abroad as well as they keep the Christian spirit in them.

The municipality is traditionally well developed agrarian region. The climate is especially good for the production of cereals and growth of vineyards. In the region of Aksakovo is located the greatest in the region greenhouse complex, where is employed on full-time year round basis an important part of the municipality population. The potential of agrarian lands is considered as priority for the economic growth of the municipality and one of the focuses is to lay the foundations of modern agricultural sector.

The favorable conditions in the municipality create opportunities for economic growth of certain sub-sectors as food industry, meat processing industry and ecologic agricultural production, as well as furniture and construction related materials.

== Organizations ==
The municipality of Aksakovo is member of the Union of the Bulgarian Black Sea Local Authorities (UBBSLA). At the moment the organization unites 20 municipalities bordering the Bulgarian Black Sea Coast, namely: Avren, Aksakovo, Balchik, Beloslav, Burgas, Byala, Varna, Valchi dol, Dalgopol, Devnya, Dobrich, Dolni Chiflik, Kavarna, Malko Tarnovo, Nesebar, Pomorie, Primorsko, Suvorovo, Shabla and Tsarevo. The president of UBBSLA is the mayor of the municipality of AKsakovo, Eng. Atanas Stoilov.

== Characteristics ==
Land area: 460.536 km^{2} (177.814 sq mi)

- Agricultural land: 58.7%
- Forestland: 24.9%
- Settlements and urban area: 5.2%
- Water area: 0.44% (3 rivers; 5 dams; 4 deep drillings with thermal water (30°C – 50°C))
- Area used for extraction of mineral resources and waste disposals: 0.14%
- Transport infrastructure and other infrastructure: 11.02%

Important information: Significant percentage of the forestland represents part of the National Park Zlatni pjasaci (Eastern part of the municipal territory).

== Settlements ==
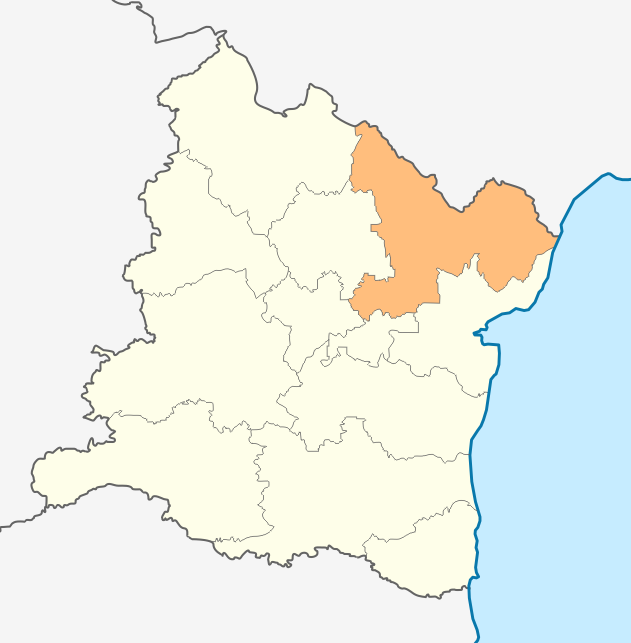
Aksakovo Municipality within Varna Province

Aksakovo Municipality includes the following 23 places (towns are shown in bold):

Town/Village	Cyrillic	Population (December 2009)
**Aksakovo**	**Аксаково**	7,897
Botevo	Ботево	251
Dobrogled	Доброглед	237
Dolishte	Долище	407
General Kantardzhievo	Генерал Кантарджиево	435
**Ignatievo**	Игнатиево	4,253
Izvorsko	Изворско	869
Kichevo	Кичево	1,103
Klimentovo	Климентово	287
Krumovo	Крумово	185
Kumanovo	Куманово	439
Lyuben Karavelovo	Любен Каравелово	1,640
Novakovo	Новаково	175
Oreshak	Орешак	300
Osenovo	Осеново	401
Pripek	Припек	116
Radevo	Радево	66
Slanchevo	Слънчево	865
Voditsa	Водица	299
Vaglen	Въглен	1,130
Yarebichna	Яребична	209
Zasmyano	Засмяно	189
Zornitsa	Зорница	166
Total		21,919

== Demography ==
The following table shows the change of the population during the last four decades.

Aksakovo Municipality
Year	1975	1985	1992	2001	2005	2007	2009	2011
Population	17,182	16,649	17,994	19,118	20,905	21,480	21,919	...
Sources: Census 2001, Census 2011, „pop-stat.mashke.org“,

=== Religion ===
According to the latest Bulgarian census of 2011, the religious composition, among those who answered the optional question on religious identification, was the following:

Religious composition of Aksakovo Municipality
Orthodox Christianity	85.7%
Catholicism	0.4%
Protestantism	1.0%
Islam	1.0%
No religion	5.4%
Prefer not to answer, others and indefinable	6.5%

An overwhelming majority of the population of Aksakovo Municipality identify themselves as Christians. At the 2011 census, 85.7% of respondents identified as Orthodox Christians belonging to the Bulgarian Orthodox Church.

== Local authorities ==
The municipal council of Aksakovo is elected for a 4-year term. The council comprises 21 municipal councillors. The current president of the Municipal Council of Aksakovo is Ms. Svetlana Dobreva. The highest-ranking official in the municipal government is the mayor who is elected for a 4-year term. The current mayor of Aksakovo is Eng. Atanas Stoilov.

== See also ==
- Provinces of Bulgaria
- Municipalities of Bulgaria
- List of cities and towns in Bulgaria
