= Devnya Municipality =

Devnya Municipality Община Девня
- Municipality
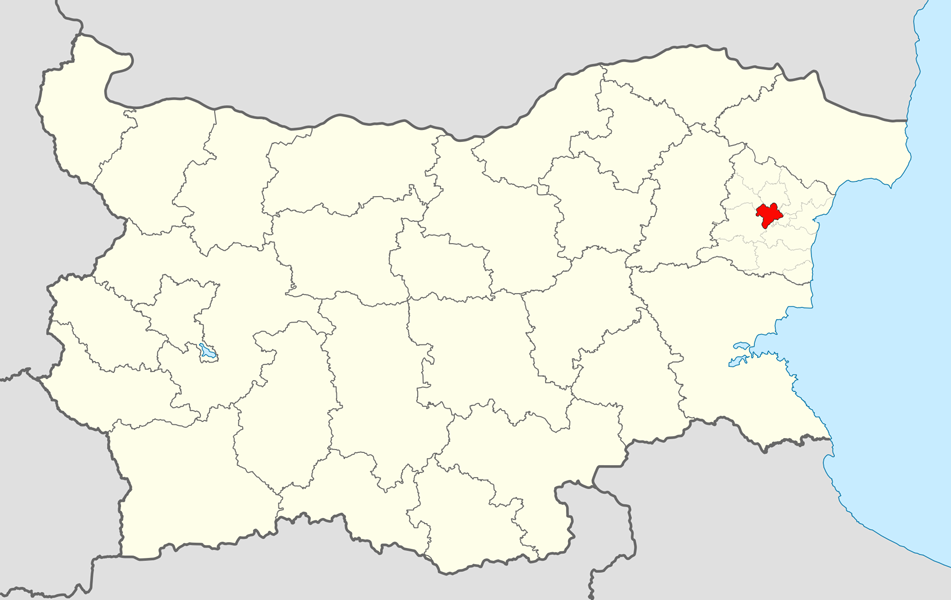
- Devnya Municipality within Bulgaria and Varna Province.
- Coordinates: 43°13′N 27°35′E
- Country: Bulgaria
- Province (Oblast): Varna
- Admin. centre (Obshtinski tsentar): Devnya

Area
  - Total: 100.98 km^{2} (38.99 sq mi)

Population (December 2009)
  - Total: 9,234
  - Density: 91.44/km^{2} (236.8/sq mi)
- Time zone: UTC+2 (EET)
  - Summer (DST): UTC+3 (EEST)

Devnya Municipality (Bulgarian: Община Девня) is a municipality (obshtina) in Varna Province, Northeastern Bulgaria, not far from the Bulgarian Black Sea Coast. It is named after its administrative centre - the town of Devnya.

The municipality embraces a territory of 100.98 km^{2} (38.99 sq mi) with a population, as of December 2009, of 9,234 inhabitants. The area is crossed by the east operating part of Hemus motorway which is planned to connect the port of Varna with the country capital - Sofia.

== Settlements ==
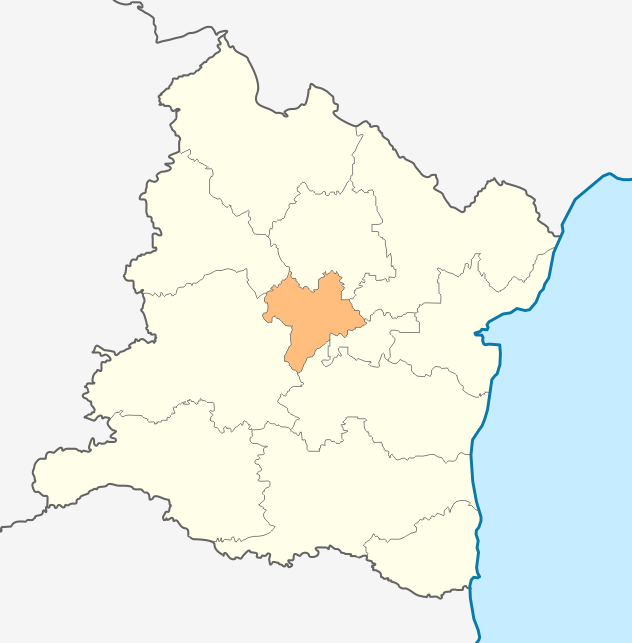
Devnya Municipality within Varna Province

Devnya Municipality includes the following 3 places (towns are shown in bold):

Town/Village	Cyrillic	Population (December 2009)
**Devnya**	**Девня**	8,383
Kipra	Кипра	509
Padina	Падина	342
Total		9,234

== Demography ==
The following table shows the change of the population during the last four decades.

Devnya Municipality
**Year**	1975	1985	1992	**2001**	2005	2007	2009	**2011**
**Population**	13,138	10,153	9,390	9,683	9,018	9,132	9,234	...
Sources: Census 2001, Census 2011, „pop-stat.mashke.org“,

=== Religion ===
According to the latest Bulgarian census of 2011, the religious composition, among those who answered the optional question on religious identification, was the following:

Religious composition of Devnya Municipality
Orthodox Christianity	77.8%
Catholicism	0.3%
Protestantism	1.2%
Islam	5.3%
No religion	5.3%
Prefer not to answer, others and indefinable	10.1%

An overwhelming majority of the population of Devnya Municipality identify themselves as Christians. At the 2011 census, 77.8% of respondents identified as Orthodox Christians belonging to the Bulgarian Orthodox Church.

== See also ==
- Provinces of Bulgaria
- Municipalities of Bulgaria
- List of cities and towns in Bulgaria
