= Popovich, Varna Province =

Popovich Попович
- Village
- Location in Bulgaria
- Coordinates: 42.835°N 27.793°E
- Country: Bulgaria
- Province: Varna Province
- Municipality: Byala Municipality
- Elevation: 29 m (95 ft)

Population (2015-09-15)
  - Total: 647

Popovich (Bulgarian: Попович) is a village in eastern Bulgaria. It is located in the municipality of Byala, Varna Province.

As of September 2015 the village has a population of 647.
