= Padina, Varna Province =

Coordinates: 43.1667°N 27.5667°E

Padina is a village of approximately 340 people situated in Devnya Municipality, Varna Province, Bulgaria.

Small and middle-sized farmers produce crops such as grain, corn, wheat, sunflowers, as well as dairy products (cow, goat, sheep milk) and livestock including meat, chicken, geese, ducks and other poultry as their primary sources of income.
