= Dyulino =

Dyulino Дюлино
- Village
- Location in Bulgaria
- Coordinates: 42.862°N 27.727°E
- Country: Bulgaria
- Province: Varna Province
- Municipality: Byala Municipality
- Elevation: 60 m (200 ft)

Population (2015-09-15)
  - Total: 393
- Postal code: 9108

Dyulino (Bulgarian: Дюлино) is a village in eastern Bulgaria. It is located in the municipality of Byala, Varna Province.

As of September 2015 the village has a population of 393.
