= Samotino =

Samotino Самотино
- Village
- Location in Bulgaria
- Coordinates: 42.939°N 27.862°E
- Country: Bulgaria
- Province: Varna Province
- Municipality: Byala Municipality
- Elevation: 130 m (430 ft)

Population (2015-09-15)
  - Total: 2
- Postal code: 9101

Samotino (Bulgarian: Самотино) is a village in eastern Bulgaria. It is located in the municipality of Byala, Varna Province.

As of September 2015 the village had a population of 2 with only one permanent resident who lives off farming. The village is accessible only via dirt roads from the neighboring villages.
