= Voditsa, Varna Province =

Voditisiasia
- Village
- Location within Bulgaria
- Coordinates: 43.3667°N 27.7333°E
- Country: Bulgaria
- Province: Varna Province
- Municipality: Aksakovo
- Time zone: UTC+2 (EET)
  - Summer (DST): UTC+3 (EEST)

Voditsa is a village in Aksakovo Municipality, in Varna Province, Bulgaria.
