= Botevo, Varna Province =

Botevo Ботево
- Village
- Location within Bulgaria
- Coordinates: 43.4333°N 27.7167°E
- Country: Bulgaria
- Province: Varna Province
- Municipality: Aksakovo

Area
  - Total: 35.676 km^{2} (13.775 sq mi)

Population (2021)
  - Total: 151
- Time zone: UTC+2 (EET)
  - Summer (DST): UTC+3 (EEST)
- Postal code: 9159
- Area code: 05117

Botevo (Bulgarian: Ботево) is a village in Aksakovo Municipality, in Varna Province, Bulgaria. Its former name was Yushenliy (Юшенлий).

== History ==
In 1914, a state-run stallion station operated in the village, under the control of the Varna district veterinary doctor.

In 1923, a railway station operated in the village, which served as an exchange station during the Romanian occupation of Dobruja. Records survive from 16 March 1923 documenting meetings held in the village between relatives living on either side of the Romanian–Bulgarian border.

== Population ==
Population of Botevo according to census data:

Population by census year
1934	1946	1956	1965	1975	1985	1992	2001	2011	2021
1696	1702	1417	928	558	396	334	282	162	151

=== Ethnic composition ===
Population by ethnic group according to the 2011 census:

	Population	Share (%)
Total	162	100.00
Bulgarians	150	92.59
Turks	9	5.55
Roma	—	—
Others	—	—
Not self-identified	—	—
Did not respond	2	1.23

== The Botev Dam ==
The Botev Dam is one of Botevo's most important features. It was built in 1956 on an area of 250 acres and is located in the Karamanliyte locality on the Suha Reka river.

By 2011, the dam was not functioning as a hydropower facility due to a lack of responsible management, and was in an emergency condition. In 2012, preparation began on complete technical documentation for the repair of the water intake and gate wells, along with construction of a control and measurement system (CIS). The firm MIT-TTX Ltd. began the overhaul of the hydraulic structures, and the dam and reservoir were completely rebuilt and restocked. Carp, grass carp, silver carp, rudd, and tench were reintroduced into the reservoir. Construction of gazebos, barbecues, bridges, and other facilities for recreational anglers was planned to begin shortly afterward.
