= Dolishte, Varna Province =

Dolishte Долище
- Village
- Location within Bulgaria
- Coordinates: 43.3333°N 27.9000°E
- Country: Bulgaria
- Province: Varna Province
- Municipality: Aksakovo

Area
  - Total: 14.048 km^{2} (5.424 sq mi)

Population (2021)
  - Total: 358
- Time zone: UTC+2 (EET)
  - Summer (DST): UTC+3 (EEST)
- Postal code: 9152
- Area code: 051104

Dolishte (Bulgarian: Долище) is a village in Aksakovo Municipality, Varna Province, Bulgaria. Until 1878 it was known as Vlahlar (Bulgarian: Влахлар). The village lies in the Batova Valley, 18 km north of Varna.

== History ==
A Thracian burial mound was excavated at Dolishte in 1962 during road construction, yielding a gold treasure.

The village was founded around 1847 by Circassians who had migrated from the Caucasus. During the April Uprising of 1876, Circassians from the village took part in suppressing the rebellion in southern Bulgaria and participated in the destruction of the village of Batak. The Circassian population left the village after the war of 1877–1878 and was replaced by Bulgarian settlers from the Odrin region.

A chapel dedicated to Saints Cyril and Methodius was established in a former mosque at the end of 1878. In 1950, an agricultural cooperative began operating in the village.

== Population ==
Population by census year
1934	1946	1956	1965	1975	1985	1992	2001	2011	2021
607	642	520	323	277	233	212	272	372	358

=== Ethnic composition ===
Population by ethnic group according to the 2011 census:

	Population	Share (%)
Total	372	100.00
Bulgarians	349	93.81
Turks	6	1.61
Roma	—	—
Others	10	2.68
Did not respond	6	1.61
