= Novakovo, Varna Province =

Novakovo
- Village
- Location within Bulgaria
- Coordinates: 43°22′N 27°50′E
- Country: Bulgaria
- Province: Varna Province
- Municipality: Aksakovo

Population (2015)
  - Total: 181
- Time zone: UTC+2 (EET)
  - Summer (DST): UTC+3 (EEST)

Novakovo is a village in Aksakovo Municipality, in Varna Province, Bulgaria.
