= Krumovo, Varna Province =

Krumovo
- Village
- Location within Bulgaria
- Coordinates: 43.3911°N 27.7806°E
- Country: Bulgaria
- Province: Varna Province
- Municipality: Aksakovo

Population (2015)
  - Total: 164
- Time zone: UTC+2 (EET)
  - Summer (DST): UTC+3 (EEST)

Krumovo is a village in Aksakovo Municipality, in Varna Province, Bulgaria.
