= Valchi Dol =

Valchi Dol Вълчи дол
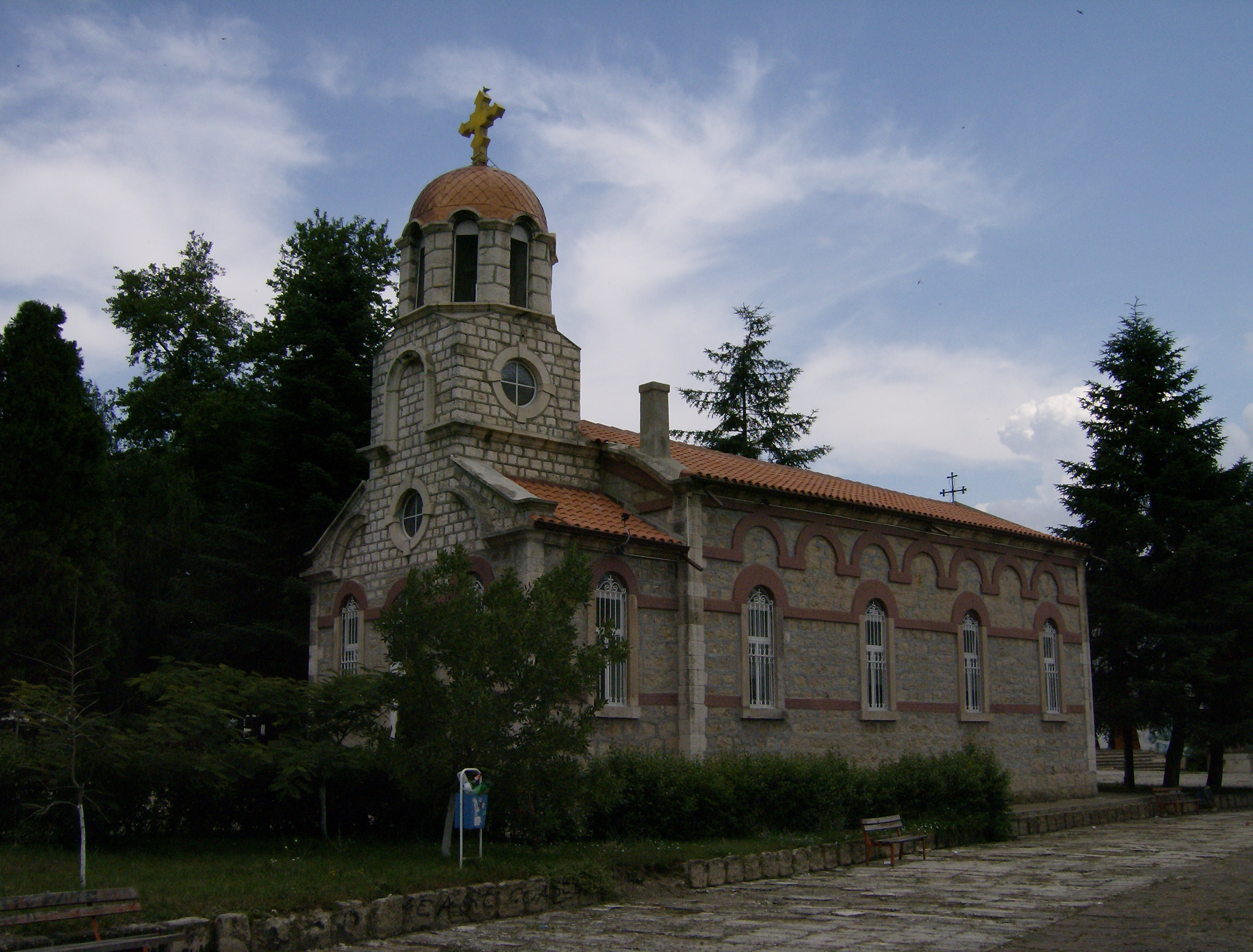
- Orthodox church in Valchi Dol

- Location of Valchi Dol
- Coordinates: 43°24′N 27°33′E
- Country: Bulgaria
- Provinces (Oblast): Varna

Government
  - Mayor: Veselin Vasilev
- Elevation: 270 m (890 ft)

Population (December 2009)
  - Total: 3,460
- Time zone: UTC+2 (EET)
  - Summer (DST): UTC+3 (EEST)
- Postal Code: 9280
- Area code: 05131

Valchi Dol (Bulgarian: Вълчи дол [ˈvɤɫtʃi ˈdɔɫ]; also transliterated Vǎlči Dol) is a town in northeastern Bulgaria, part of Varna Province. It is the administrative centre of Valchi Dol Municipality, which lies in the northwestern part of the Province. In December 2009 the town had 3,460 inhabitants.

Valchi Dol is located at the watershed of the Dobruja, Varna and Shumen plateaux. Its name means "wolf's ravine" in Bulgarian, which is also reflected in its old Ottoman Turkish name, Kurtdere. It was a village until proclaimed a town in 1974. A diesel power plant was installed in 1929, the first in a village in Bulgaria
