= Klimentovo, Varna Province =

Klimentovo
- Village
- Location within Bulgaria
- Coordinates: 43.3500°N 27.9500°E
- Country: Bulgaria
- Province: Varna Province
- Municipality: Aksakovo
- Elevation: 260 m (850 ft)
- Time zone: UTC+2 (EET)
  - Summer (DST): UTC+3 (EEST)

Klimentovo is a village in Aksakovo Municipality, in Varna Province, Bulgaria.
