= Ignatievo =

Ignatievo Игнатиево
- Town
- Location within Bulgaria
- Coordinates: 43°15′N 27°46′E
- Country: Bulgaria
- Province: Varna Province
- Municipality: Aksakovo

Government

Area
  - Total: 258 km^{2} (100 sq mi)
- Elevation: 77 m (253 ft)

Population (31–12–2019)
  - Total: 3,932
- Time zone: UTC+2 (EET)
  - Summer (DST): UTC+3 (EEST)

Ignatievo (Bulgarian: Игнатиево [iɡˈnatievo]) is a town in Aksakovo Municipality, in Varna Province, Bulgaria. It is a rural town with its population being 80% Kalderash Gypsies, Turkish Цоцоман Gypsies, with little of it populated with Bulgarian people.
