= Dobrogled =

- Village
- Location within Bulgaria
- Coordinates: 43°16′N 27°46′E
- Country: Bulgaria
- Province: Varna Province
- Municipality: Aksakovo Municipality

Area
  - Total: 7.307 km^{2} (2.821 sq mi)
- Elevation: 177 m (581 ft)

Population (2021)
  - Total: 370
- Time zone: UTC+2 (EET)
  - Summer (DST): UTC+3 (EEST)

Dobrogled is a village in Aksakovo Municipality, Varna Province, Bulgaria.

== Geography ==
Dobrogled is located in northeastern Bulgaria, approximately 13 km from Varna. It covers an area of 7.307 km² and lies at an elevation of 177 m.

== History ==
The village was known as Elech until 1934.

Records from 1914 mention the construction of a municipal fountain in the village, compensation paid to the local school board for the survey of transferred municipal lands, and legal proceedings concerning municipal land occupied without authorization by the company Grozd.

== Population ==
The population of Dobrogled according to census data was:

Year	Population
1934	274
1946	249
1956	198
1965	97
1975	68
1985	36
1992	57
2001	117
2011	281
2021	370

=== Ethnic composition ===
==== 2011 census ====
According to the 2011 census, the ethnic composition of the village was as follows:

Ethnic group	Population	%
Total	281	100.00
Bulgarians	233	82.91
Turks	4	1.42
Romani	–	–
Other	–	–
Undeclared	–	–
No response	43	15.30
