= Pripek, Varna Province =

Pripek
- Village
- Location within Bulgaria
- Coordinates: 43.2500°N 27.7833°E
- Country: Bulgaria
- Province: Varna Province
- Municipality: Aksakovo
- Elevation: 256 m (840 ft)
- Time zone: UTC+2 (EET)
  - Summer (DST): UTC+3 (EEST)

Pripek is a village in Aksakovo Municipality, in Varna Province, Bulgaria.
