= Yarebichna =

- Village
- Location within Bulgaria
- Coordinates: 43.3000°N 27.8667°E
- Country: Bulgaria
- Province: Varna Province
- Municipality: Aksakovo
- Time zone: UTC+2 (EET)
  - Summer (DST): UTC+3 (EEST)

Yarebichna is a village in Aksakovo Municipality, in Varna Province, Bulgaria.

Yarebichna is a village in the municipality of Aksakovo, in Varna Province, Bulgaria.

It is surrounded by a quiet forest necklace. From sea capital can be reached by asphalt road in Kamenar to Balchik. The distance is 12 km. Can travel in and through Kicevo deviation Municipality. The old name of the village is small Franga. According to local legend, a few centuries these places settled two French brothers. Larger staying in Kamenar. Because of him, that great name of the village Franga. Less - in analogy Yarebichna and started calling him Little Franga. Probably the old names of the two villages are connected with Frangensko plateau.

In 1934, by order of the Government of Kimon Georgiev village was renamed Yarebichna - Spider Mountain peak in Macedonia. On it at the end of May 1918, the Bulgarian army suffered a great defeat by the French-Greek troops during the First World War. 1,712 soldiers were captured. Some time in 1917, the peak is defended by sea Eighth Regiment French manage to conquer it, but after a few days with a surprise attack Primortsi recover their positions.

The village has grown over a century ago. It settled families Lozengrad and Thrace and Malko Tarnovo. They bought land from Turkish farms. Today Yarebichna live more than 300 people, but most are immigrants from Bulgaria. A few years ago the village was consecrated a new Orthodox church "Ascension of Christ". Currently six English families living in Yarebichna. Near the village there are shops for the processing of meat, production of furniture and chicken cuts.

== Sources ==
- Yarebichna Varna Province
