= Valchi Dol Municipality =

Valchi Dol Municipality Община Вълчи Дол
- Municipality
- Coat of arms

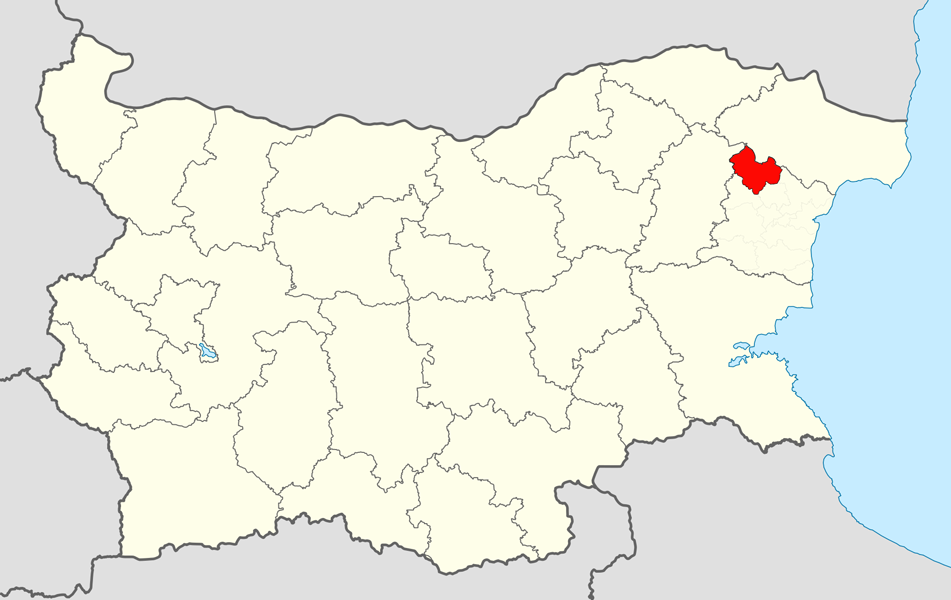
- Valchi Dol Municipality within Bulgaria and Varna Province.
- Coordinates: 43°24′N 27°33′E
- Country: Bulgaria
- Province (Oblast): Varna
- Admin. centre (Obshtinski tsentar): Valchi Dol

Area
  - Total: 472.5 km^{2} (182.4 sq mi)

Population (December 2009)
  - Total: 11,093
  - Density: 23.48/km^{2} (60.81/sq mi)
- Time zone: UTC+2 (EET)
  - Summer (DST): UTC+3 (EEST)

Valchi Dol Municipality (Bulgarian: Община Вълчи Дол) is a municipality (obshtina) in Varna Province, Northeastern Bulgaria. It is named after its administrative centre - the town of Valchi Dol.

The municipality embraces a territory of 472.5 km^{2} with a population, as of December 2009, of 11,093 inhabitants.

== Settlements ==
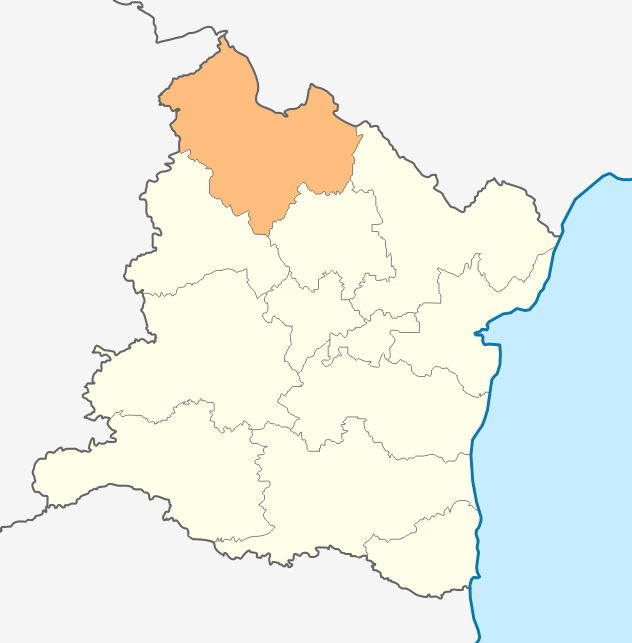
Valchi Dol Municipality within Varna Province

Valchi Dol Municipality includes the following 22 places (towns are shown in bold):

Town/Village	Cyrillic	Population (December 2009)
**Valchi Dol**	**Вълчи дол**	3,460
Boyana	Бояна	282
Brestak	Брестак	1,029
Cherventsi	Червенци	573
Dobrotich	Добротич	410
General Kiselovo	Генерал Киселово	518
General Kolevo	Генерал Колево	325
Esenitsa	Есеница	345
Iskar	Искър	147
Izvornik	Изворник	213
Kaloyan	Калоян	294
Karamanite	Караманите	331
Krakra	Кракра	34
Metlichina	Метличина	189
Mihalich	Михалич	753
Oborishte	Оборище	315
Radan Voyvoda	Радан войвода	387
Shtipsko	Щипско	221
Stefan Karadzha	Стефан Караджа	854
Strahil	Страхил	75
Voyvodino	Войводино	264
Zvanets	Звънец	74
Total		11,093

== Demography ==
The following table shows the change of the population during the last four decades.

Valchi Dol Municipality
Year	1975	1985	1992	2001	2005	2007	2009	2011
Population	20,014	16,497	14,792	12,973	12,061	11,595	11,093	...
Sources: Census 2001, Census 2011, „pop-stat.mashke.org“,

=== Religion ===
According to the latest Bulgarian census of 2011, the religious composition, among those who answered the optional question on religious identification, was the following:

Religious composition of Vlachi Dol Municipality
Orthodox Christianity	56.0%
Catholicism	0.5%
Protestantism	0.5%
Islam	26.3%
No religion	3.7%
Prefer not to answer, others and indefinable	13.0%

A majority of the population of Vlachi Dol Municipality identify themselves as Christians. At the 2011 census, 56.0% of respondents identified as Orthodox Christians belonging to the Bulgarian Orthodox Church. Muslims constitute the largest minority with 26.3% of its population.

== See also ==
- Provinces of Bulgaria
- Municipalities of Bulgaria
- List of cities and towns in Bulgaria
