= Kichevo, Bulgaria =

Kichevo
- Village
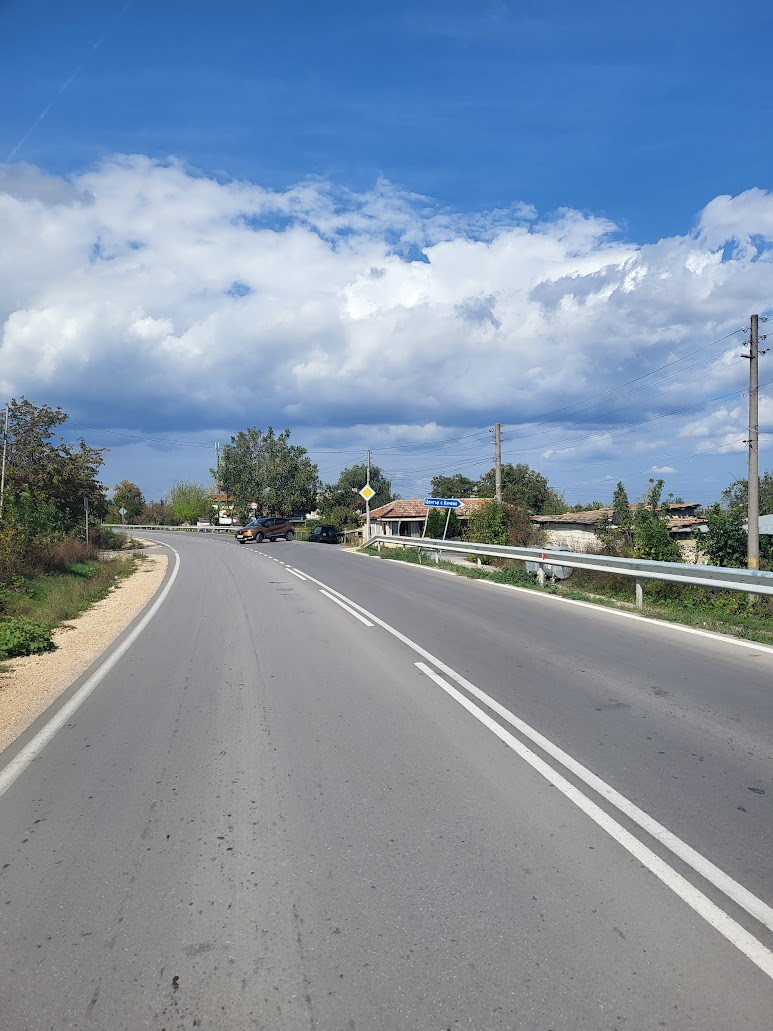

- Location within Bulgaria
- Coordinates: 43.274837°N 27.965510°E
- Country: Bulgaria
- Province: Varna Province
- Municipality: Aksakovo
- Elevation: 360 m (1,180 ft)
- Time zone: UTC+2 (EET)
  - Summer (DST): UTC+3 (EEST)

Kichevo is a village in Aksakovo Municipality, in Varna Province, Bulgaria.
