= Osenovo, Varna Province =

Osenovo
- Village
- Location within Bulgaria
- Coordinates: 43.3167°N 28.0167°E
- Country: Bulgaria
- Province: Varna Province
- Municipality: Aksakovo
- Elevation: 120 m (390 ft)
- Time zone: UTC+2 (EET)
  - Summer (DST): UTC+3 (EEST)

Osenovo is a village in Aksakovo Municipality, in Varna Province, Bulgaria.
