= Kumanovo, Bulgaria =

Kumanovo
- Village
- Location within Bulgaria
- Coordinates: 43°16′N 27°56′E
- Country: Bulgaria
- Province: Varna Province
- Municipality: Aksakovo
- Elevation: 309 m (1,014 ft)
- Time zone: UTC+2 (EET)
  - Summer (DST): UTC+3 (EEST)

Kumanovo is a village in Aksakovo Municipality, in Varna Province, Bulgaria.

Kumanovo Peak on Oscar II Coast in Graham Land, Antarctica is named after the village.
