= Lyuben Karavelovo =

- Village
- Location within Bulgaria
- Coordinates: 43°21′N 27°47′E
- Country: Bulgaria
- Province: Varna Province
- Municipality: Aksakovo
- Elevation: 346 m (1,135 ft)
- Time zone: UTC+2 (EET)
  - Summer (DST): UTC+3 (EEST)

Lyuben Karavelovo (Bulgarian: Любен Каравелово) is a village in Aksakovo Municipality, in Varna Province, Bulgaria.
