= Geography of Bulgaria =

- Continent: Europe
- Region: Balkan Peninsula, Southeast Europe
- Coordinates: 42°45′N 25°30′E
- Area: Ranked 103rd
  - Total: 110,993.6 km^{2} (42,854.9 sq mi)
- Coastline: 378 km (235 mi)
- Borders: 1,867 km
- Highest point: Musala, 2,925 m (9,596 ft)
- Lowest point: Black Sea, 0 m
- Longest river: Iskar River, 368 km (229 mi)
- Largest lake: Lake Burgas; 27 km^{2} (10 sq mi)
- Climate: temperate in north to Mediterranean in south
- Terrain: mountains and hills with lowlands in north and southeast
- Natural resources: copper, lead, zinc, coal, timber, arable land
- Natural hazards: earthquakes (in certain areas), floods, landslides
- Environmental issues: air and water pollution, deforestation, soil contamination
- Exclusive economic zone: 110,879 km^{2} (42,811 sq mi)

Bulgaria is a country situated in Southeast Europe that occupies the eastern quarter of the Balkan peninsula, being the largest country within its geographic boundaries. It borders Romania to the north, Serbia and North Macedonia to the west, Greece and Turkey to the south, and the Black Sea to the east. The northern border with Romania follows the river Danube until the city of Silistra. The land area of Bulgaria is 110,994 square kilometres (42,855 sq mi) (111,002 square kilometres (42,858 sq mi)), slightly larger than that of Cuba, Iceland or the U.S. state of Tennessee. Considering its relatively compact territorial size and shape, Bulgaria has a great variety of topographical features. Even within small parts of the country, the land may be divided into plains, plateaus, hills, mountains, basins, gorges, and deep river valleys. The geographic center of Bulgaria is located in Uzana.

Bulgaria features notable diversity with the landscape ranging from the snow-capped peaks in Rila, Pirin and the Balkan Mountains to the mild and sunny Black Sea coast and southernmost valleys; from the typically continental Danubian Plain (ancient Moesia) in the north to the strong Mediterranean climatic influence in the valleys of Macedonia and in the lowlands in the southernmost of Thrace, the lowest parts of the Upper Thracian Plain, along the Maritsa River, the Southern Bulgarian Black Sea Coast. Most of the country is situated within the humid continental climate region, with Alpine climate in the highest mountains and subtropical climate in the southernmost regions.

The country has a dense river network but with the notable exception of the river Danube, rivers are mostly short and with low water flow. The average annual precipitation is 670 mm; the rainfall is lower in the lowlands and higher in the mountains. The driest region is Dobrudzha in the north-eastern part of the Danubian Plain (450 mm), while the highest rainfall has been measured in the upper valley of the river Ogosta in the western Balkan Mountains (2293 mm).

Bulgaria has substantial land in agriculture and forest. In 2006 land use and land cover was 5% intensive human use, 52% agriculture including pasture, 31% forest, 11% woodland-shrub, grassland, and non-vegetated, and 1% water.

Phytogeographically, Bulgaria straddles the Illyrian and Euxinian provinces of the Circumboreal Region within the Boreal Kingdom. The country falls within six terrestrial ecoregions of the Palearctic realm: Balkan mixed forests (main), Rodope montane mixed forests (main in the mountains), Euxine-Colchic deciduous forests, Aegean and Western Turkey sclerophyllous and mixed forests, East European forest steppe and Pontic–Caspian steppe.

== Boundaries and territory ==
The borders of Bulgaria have a total length of 2,245 km; of them 1,181 km are land boundary and 686 km are formed by rivers. The coastline is 378 km.

The northern border with Romania is 609 km. Most of the frontier (470 km) is formed by the river Danube from the mouth of the river Timok in the west to the city of Silistra in the east. The land border from Silistra to Cape Sivriburun at the Black Sea is 139 km long. The Danube, with steep bluffs on the Bulgarian side and a wide area of swamps and marshes on the Romanian side, is crossed by two bridges – New Europe Bridge between Vidin and Calafat, and Danube Bridge between Ruse and Giurgiu. There are 48 Bulgarian and 32 Romanian islands along the river Danube; the largest one, Belene (41 km^{2}), belongs to Bulgaria. The land frontier has three border crossings at Silistra, Kardam and Durankulak at the Black Sea. It is also crossed by a major gas pipeline transporting natural gas from Russia to Bulgaria.

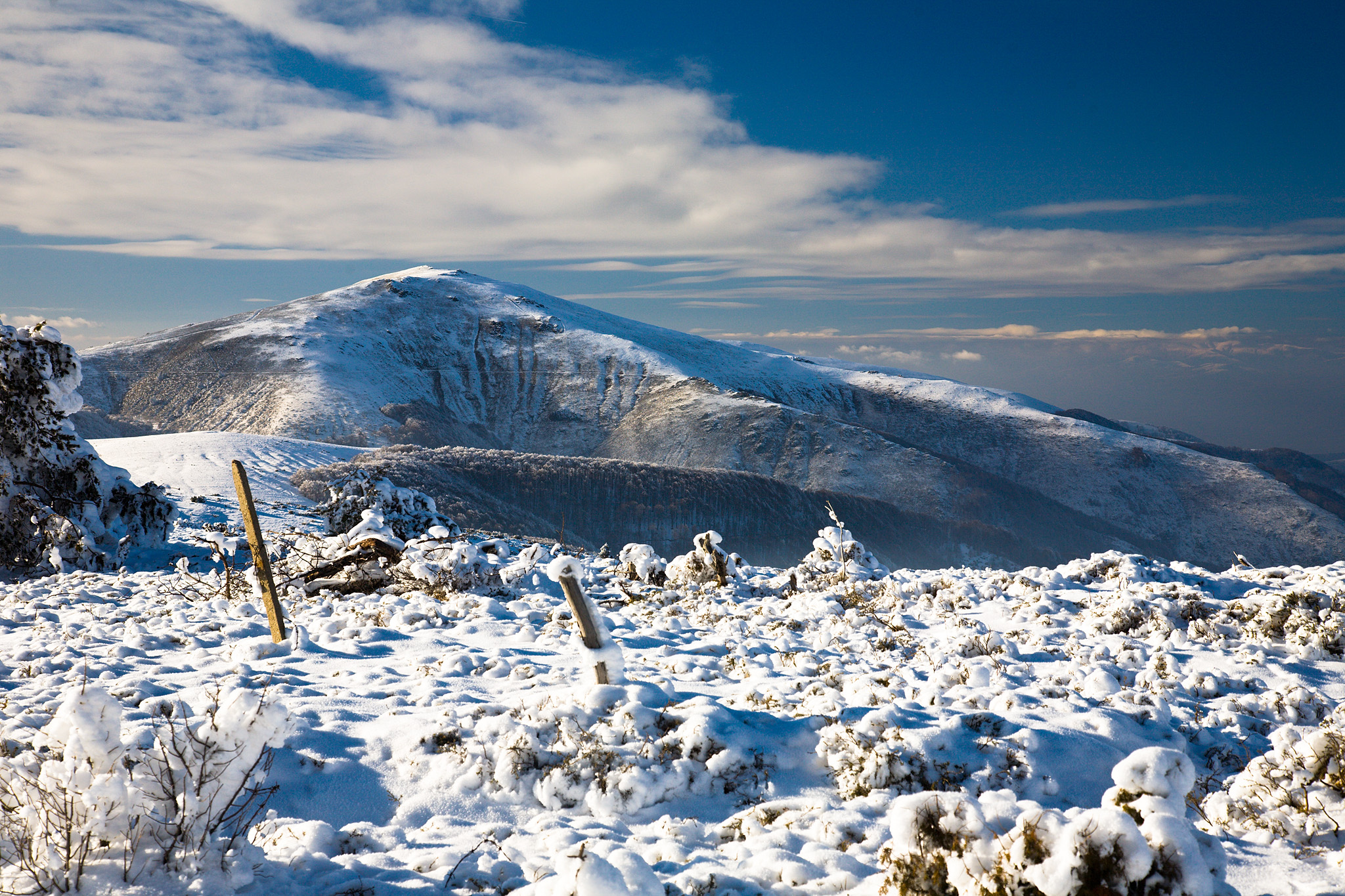
A winter view of the Vlahina Mountain near the border with North Macedonia

The eastern border (378 km) is maritime and encompasses the Bulgarian Black Sea Coast from Cape Sivriburun in the north to the mouth of the Rezovo River in the south. Bulgaria's littoral forms 1/10 of the total Black Sea coastline, and includes two important gulfs, the Gulf of Varna and the Gulf of Burgas, harbouring the country's two major ports.

The southern border is 752 km long, of them 259 km are with Turkey and 493 km are with Greece. The Bulgaria–Turkey frontier runs from the mouth of the Rezovo River in the east through the Strandzha Mountains and the Dervent Heights, crosses the river Tundzha at the village of Matochina and ends at the river Maritsa at the village of Kapitan Andreevo. There are three border crossings at Malko Tarnovo, Lesovo and Kapitan Andreevo. The border with Greece runs from Kapitan Andreevo through several ridges of the Rhodope Mountains, generally following the watershed of the rivers Arda and Vacha on the Bulgarian side, runs through the Slavyanka Mountain, crosses the river Struma at the village of Kulata and runs through the crest of the Belasitsa Mountain to the Tumba Peak. There are six border checkpoints at Svilengrad, Ivaylovgrad, Makaza, Zlatograd, Ilinden and Kulata.

The western border is 506 km long, of them 165 km are with North Macedonia and 341 km are with Serbia. The frontier with North Macedonia runs from the Tumba Peak in the south through the mountains of Ograzhden, Maleshevo, Vlahina and Osogovo up to mount Kitka. There are three border crossings near the town of Petrich and at the villages of Logodazh and Gyueshevo. The border with Serbia runs from Kitka through the mountainous region Kraishte, including the Ruy Mountain, crosses the valley of the river Nishava, runs through the main watershed of the western Balkan Mountains and follows the river Timok for 15 km until its confluence with the Danube. There are five border checkpoints at Dolno Uyno, Strezimirovtsi, Kalotina, Vrashka Chuka and Bregovo.

== Topography ==
Topographic map of Bulgaria highlighting the main mountain ranges

The relief of Bulgaria is varied. In the relatively small territory of the country there are extensive lowlands, plains, hills, low and high mountains, many valleys and deep gorges. The main characteristic of Bulgaria's topography is four alternating bands of high and low terrain that extend east to west across the country. From north to south, those bands, called geomorphological regions, are the Danubian Plain, the Balkan Mountains, the Transitional region and the Rilo-Rhodope region. The easternmost sections near the Black Sea are hilly, but they gradually gain height to the west until the westernmost part of the country is entirely high ground.

Distribution of the height zones in Bulgaria
Height zones	Height range (m)	Area	
Height zones	Height range (m)	(km^{2})	(%)
Lowlands	0–200	34,858	31.42
Hills	200–600	45,516	41.00
Low mountains	600–1000	16,918	15.24
Medium-high mountains	1000–1600	10,904	9.82
High mountains	1600–2925	2,798	2.52

More than two-thirds of the country is plains, plateaus, or hilly land at an altitude less than 600 m. Plains (below 200 m) make up 31% of the land, plateaus and hills (200 to 600 m) 41%, low mountains (600 to 1,000 m) 10%, medium-high mountains (1,000 to 1,500 m) 10%, and high mountains (over 1,500 m) 3%. The average altitude of Bulgaria is 470 m.

The contemporary relief of Bulgaria is a result of continuous geological evolution. The Bulgarian lands were often submerged by ancient seas and lakes, some land layers rose others sank. Volcanic eruptions were common both on land and in the water basins. All three main groups of rocks, magmatic, sedimentary and metamorphic, are found in the country. The oldest rock formations in Bulgaria date from the Precambrian period than 500 million years ago. During the Archean, Proterozoic and Paleozoic eras (4.0 billion to 252 million years ago) the magmatic rocks were formed. Throughout most of that period the only land areas were Rila, Pirin and the western Rhodope Mountains. The Mesozoic era (252 million to 66 million years ago) saw the beginning of the Alpine orogeny that has formed the mountain ranges of the Alpide belt, including the Balkan Mountains and Sredna Gora. The Cenozoic era (since 66 million years ago) is characterized with active tectonic processes, the definitive formation of the Balkan Mountains, the formation of grabens and horsts in Rila, Pirin and Kraishte region.

Examples of rock formations in Bulgaria

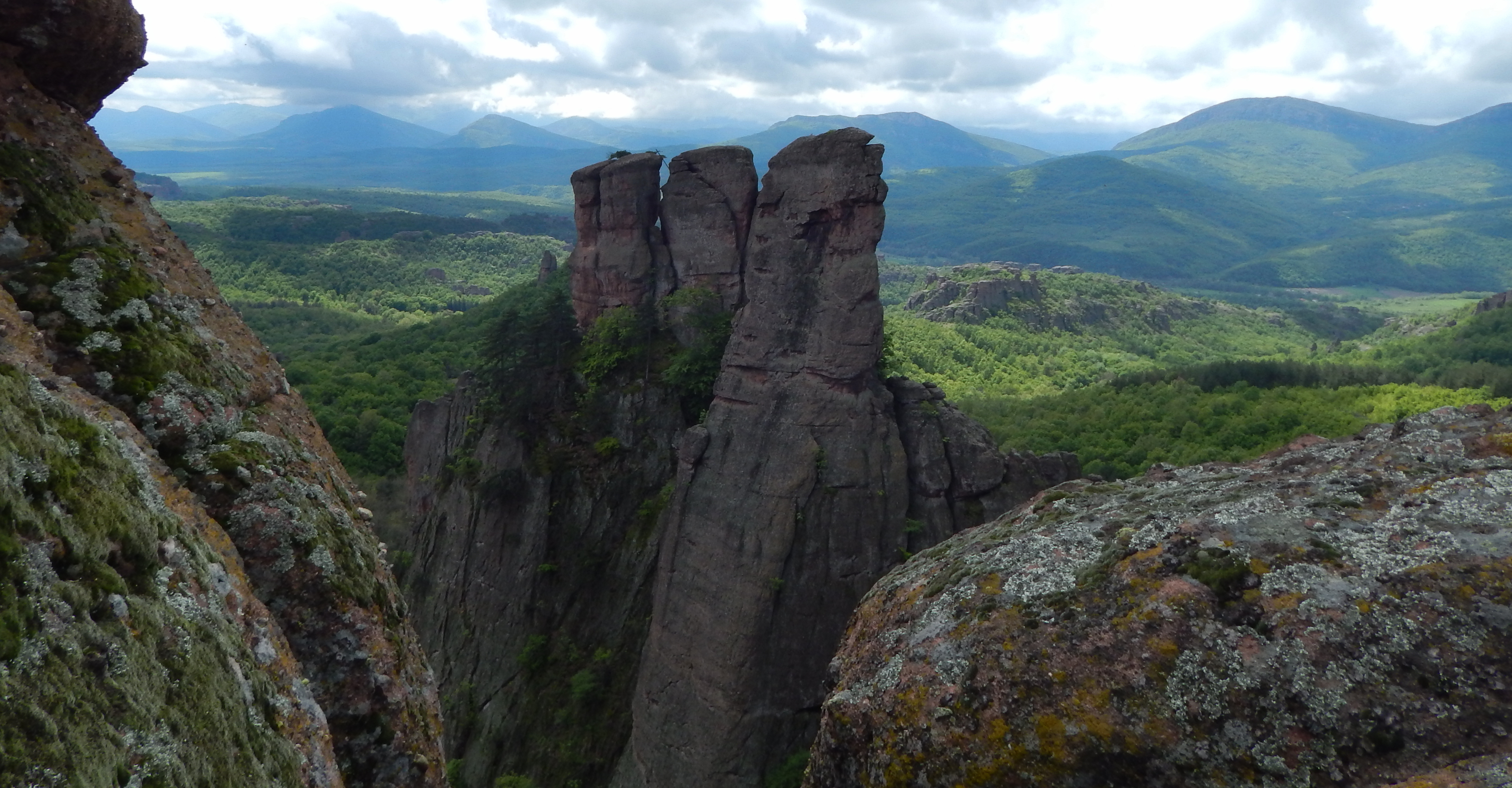
Belogradchik Rocks, western Balkan Mountains

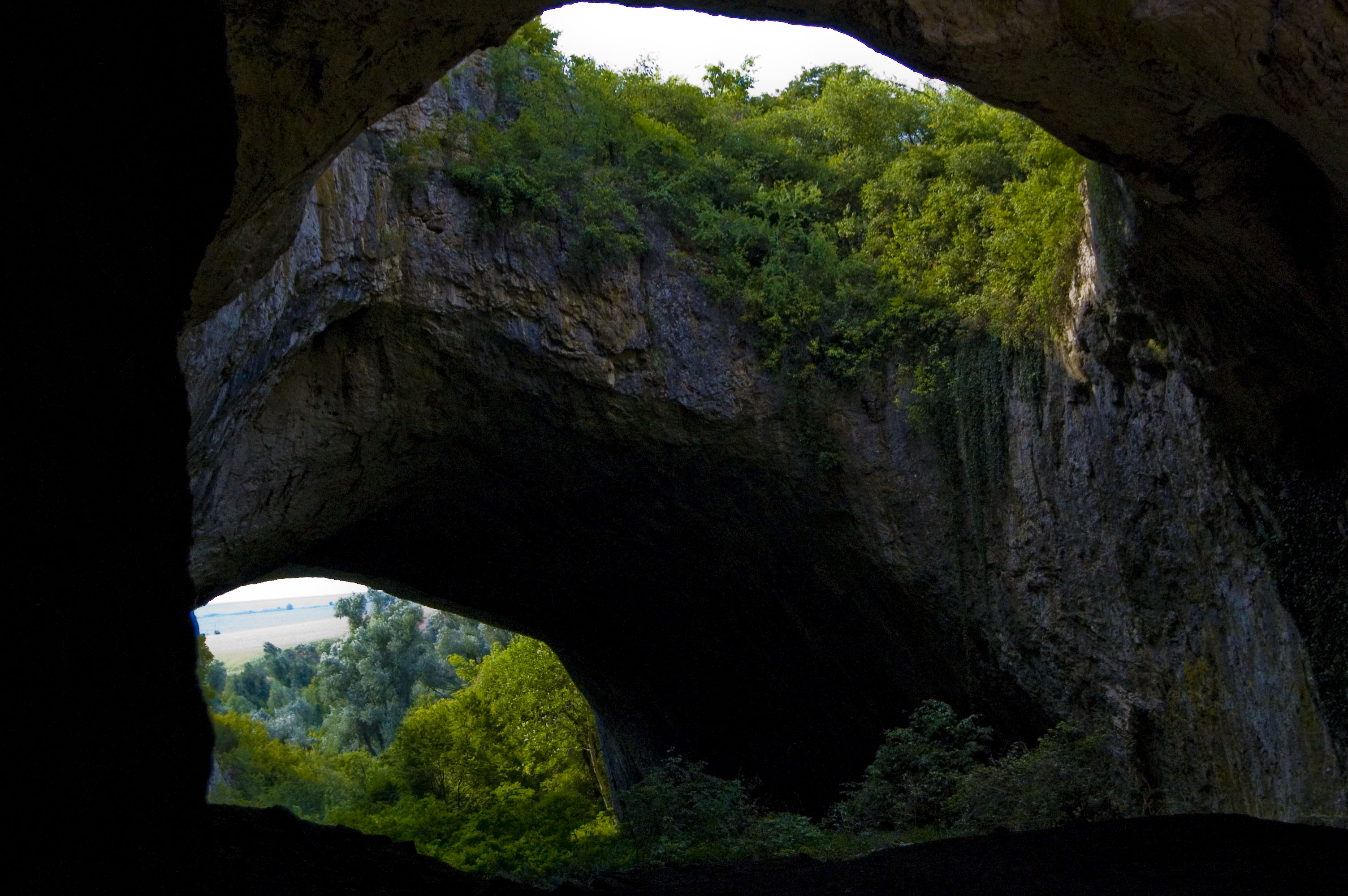
Devetashka cave, Pre-Balkan

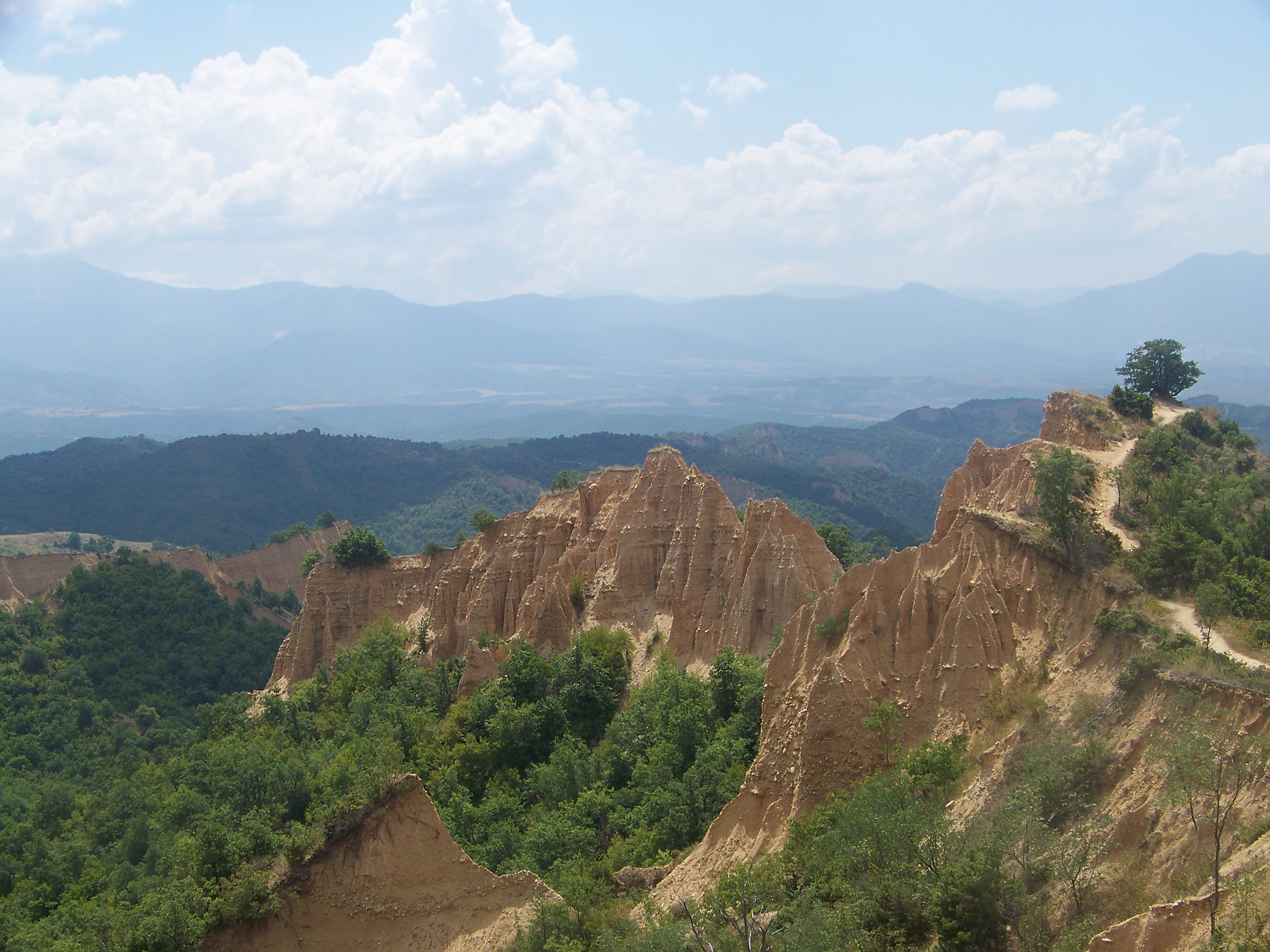
Melnik Earth Pyramids, Pirin Mountains

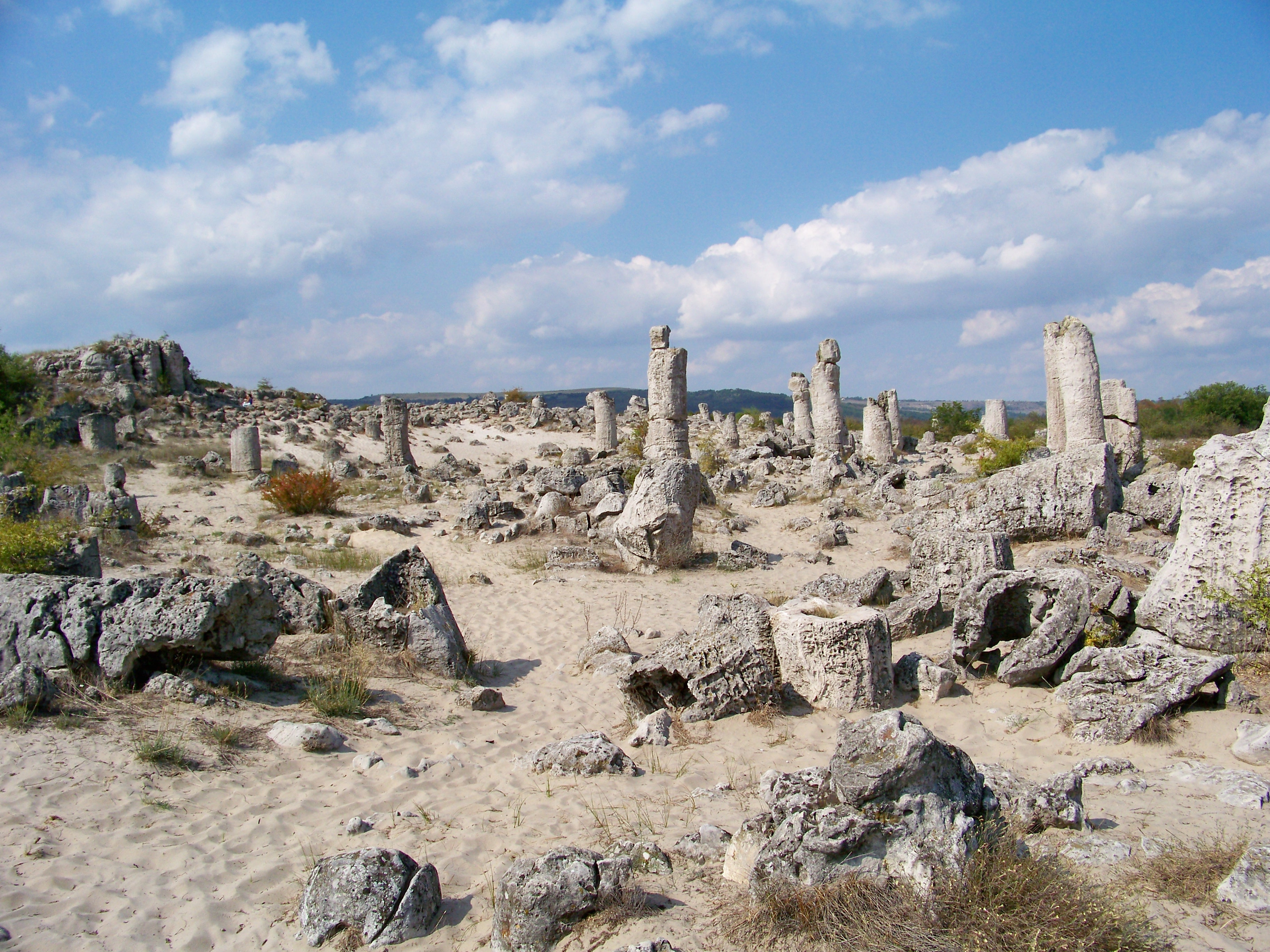
Pobiti Kamani, Danubian Plain

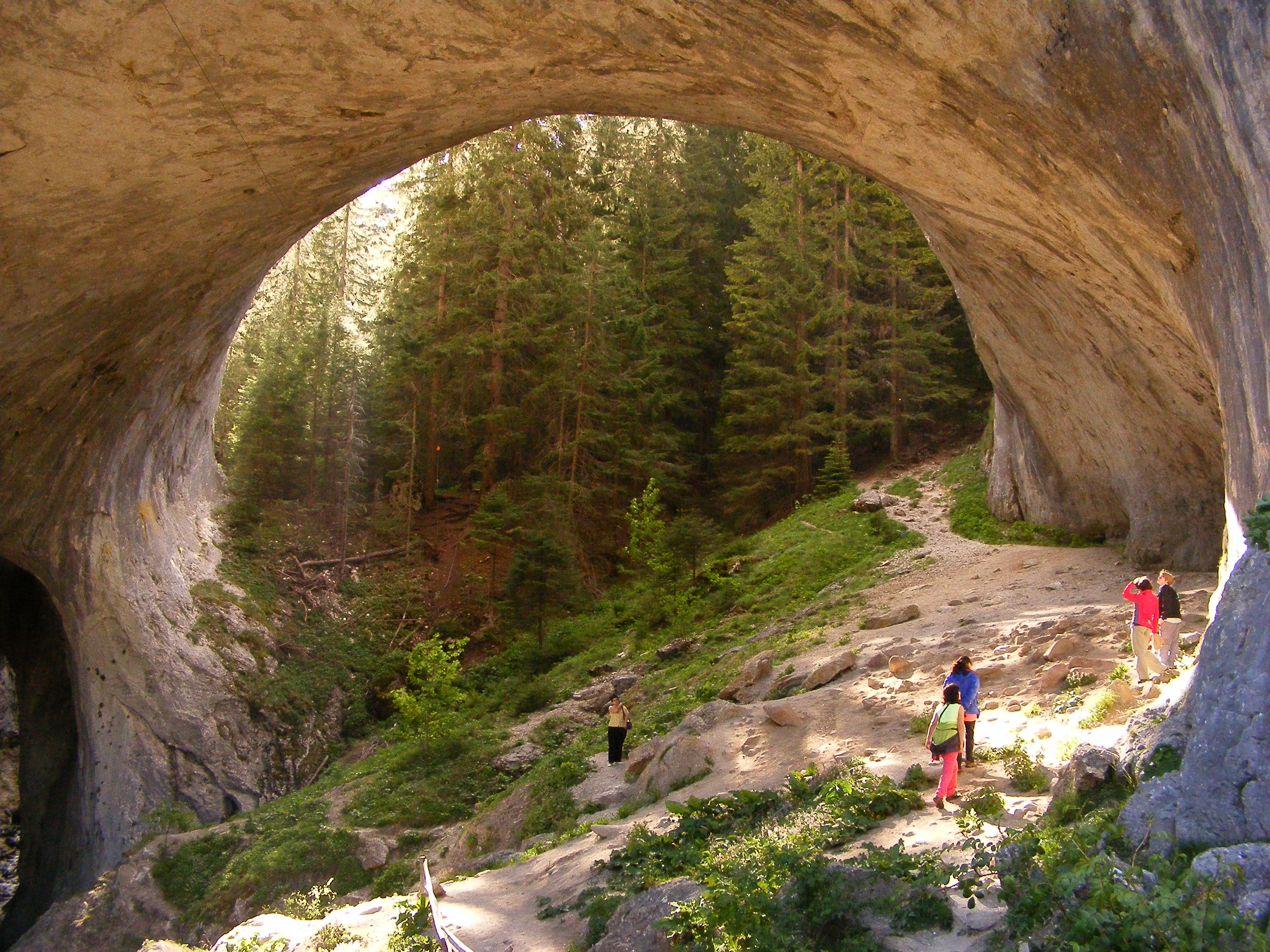
Marvelous Bridges, Rhodope Mountains

Exogenous processes such as weathering, erosion and sedimentation have an important impact on modelling the land surface and creating rock formations. The exogenous processes have formed stone rivers in Vitosha; screes in the Balkan Mountains, Rila and Pirin; earth pyramids in Melnik, Stob and Katina; landslides, mainly along the Danube banks and the northern Black Sea coast; fluvial terraces; aeolian forms, such as dunes; karst forms, including numerous caves, sinkholes, ponors, etc.

=== Danubian Plain ===
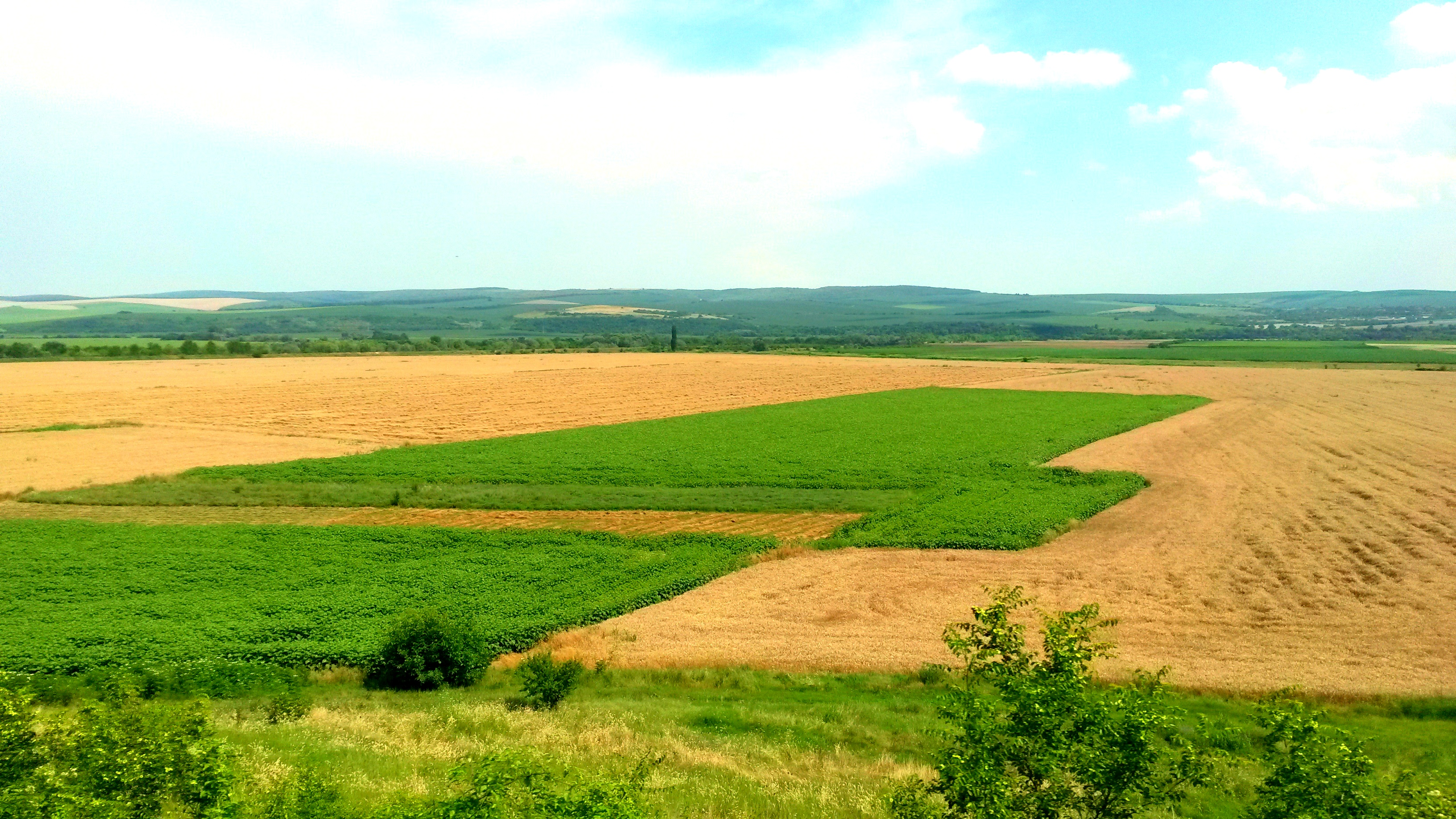
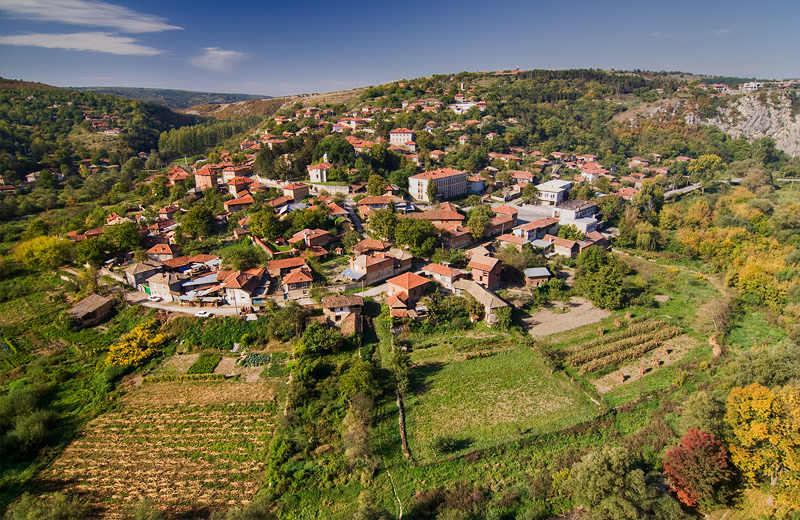
Left: Fields in the Danubian Plain between Veliko Tarnovo and Ruse. Right: The village of Cherven, Ruse Province

The Danubian Plain encompasses the Moesian plate and extends from the river Timok in the west to the Black Sea in the east and from the river Danube in the north to the Balkan Mountains in the south, covering 31,520 km^{2}, or almost 1/3 of Bulgaria's total area. Its width varies from 25 to 30 km in the west to 120 km in the east. The highest point is Tarnov Dyal (502 m) on the Shumen Plateau; the average altitude is 178 m. As a result of the rock weathering processes the relief is uneven with fertile alluvial plains along the Danube (Vidinska, Chernopolska, Zlatia, Belenska, Pobrezhie, Aidemirska), and hilly terrain in the remaining area, including plateaus in the east. The altitude rises from west to east. The valleys of the rivers Vit and Yantra divide the Danubian Plain into three parts – western, central and eastern. The topography of the plain is characterized with hilly heights and plateaus. Most of the heights and all plateaus are situated in the eastern parts. There are 14 basalt mounds between Svishtov and the village of Dragomirovo.

The predominant soil types are loess in the north, reaching a depth of up to 100 m at the banks of the Danube, and chernozem in the south. The climate is temperate. The flat relief and the openness of plain to the north facilitate arrival of moist air masses in spring, summer and autumn. In winter the Danubian Plain falls under the influence of the Eastern European anticyclone, which brings cold Arctic air masses. The mean temperature in January is −1 °C and in July is 24 °C, making it the geomorphological region with the highest average annual amplitude in Bulgaria – 25 °C.

=== Balkan Mountains ===
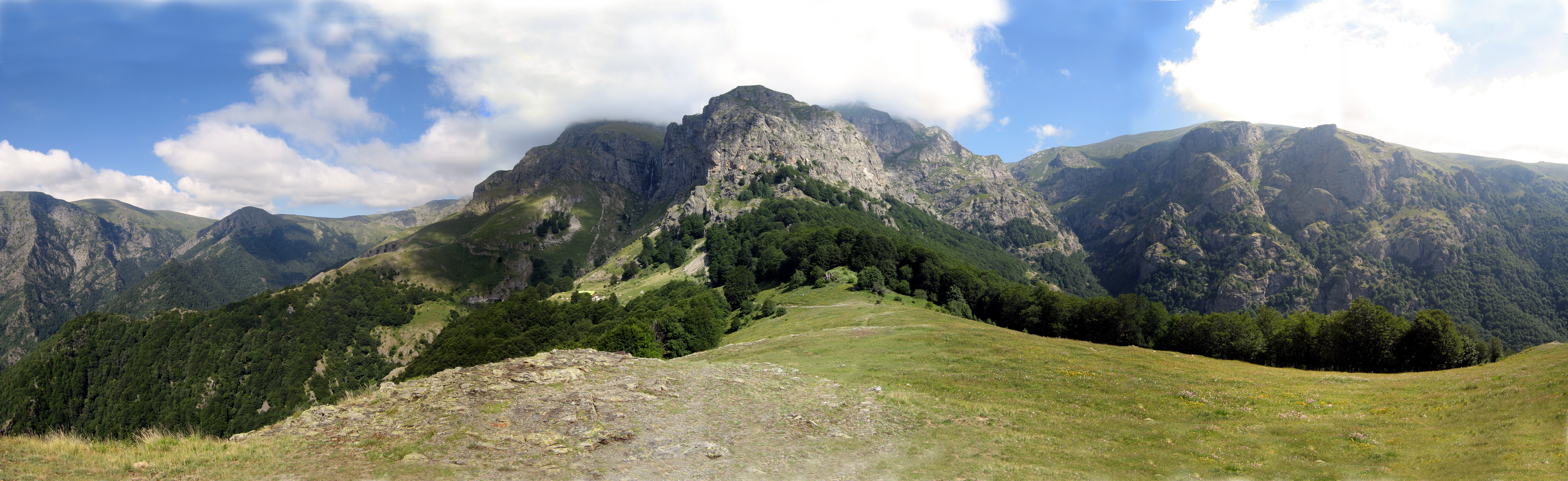
A view of the central Balkan Mountains

The Balkan Mountains range is a geological continuation of the Carpathian Mountains, forming part of the Alpine-Himalayan orogenic belt. This region is subdivided into two geomorphological units, the Pre-Balkan and the Balkan Mountains, also known in Bulgarian as Стара Планина – "Old Mountain". Their average altitude is 370 m and 735 m, respectively. Its total area is 26,720 km^{2}, of them the Pre-Balkan spans 15,730 km^{2} and the Balkan Mountains – almost 11,000 km^{2}. The mountain range stretches from the valley of the river Timok in the west to Cape Emine at the Black Sea coast in the east, spanning a length of 555 km and width between 20 and 70 km. The Balkan Mountains are divided into western, central and eastern part by the Zlatitsa and Vratnik Passes. The range is highest in its central part, which includes Botev Peak at 2,376 m; the altitude drops slowly to the east until it reaches the sea. The relief is varied, with many mountain passes, gorges and landforms. The southern slopes are steeper than the northern. For the most part the Balkan Range defines the most important watershed in Bulgaria with rivers draining north to the Danube or south to the river Maritsa and the Aegean Sea. Several rivers in the east drain directly into the Black Sea. In the west, the river Iskar forms a 65-km long gorge that runs north through the mountains.

=== Transitional region ===
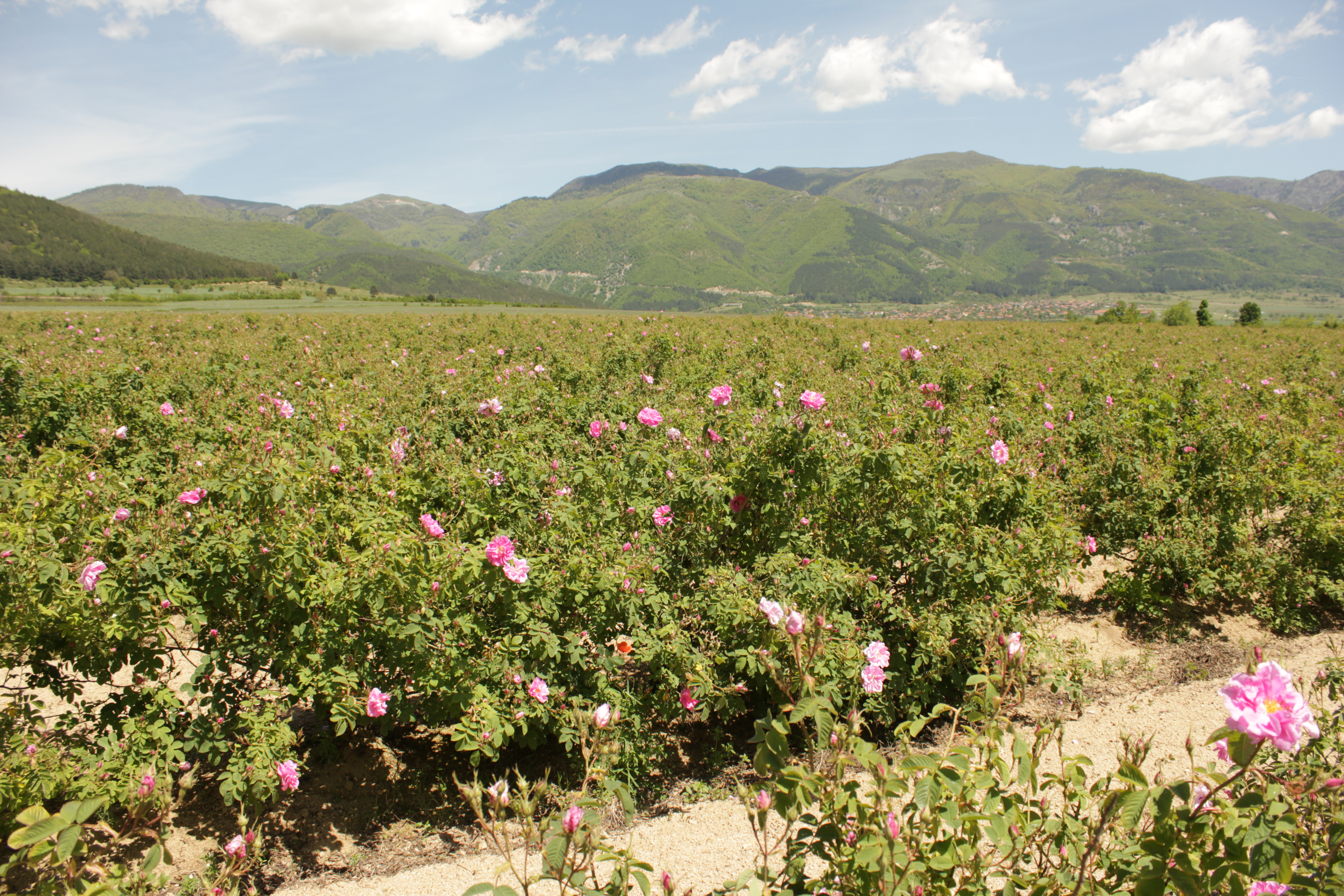
The Rose Valley

The Transitional geomorphological region encompasses the territory between the Balkan Mountains and the Rilo-Rhodope Massif and has complex, mosaic relief composed mainly of medium-high and low mountains, valleys and plains. The altitude decreases from west to east. This region includes the Sub-Balkan valleys; the mountains and valleys of the Kraishte region, such as Ruy Mountain, Miloslavska planina and Milevska Planina; the mountain ranges Lyulin, Vitosha, Sredna Gora, Strandzha and Sakar; the Dervent Heights; as well as the fertile Upper Thracian Plain. The highest point is Cherni Vrah in Vitosha at 2,290 m.

The Sub-Balkan valleys include eleven valleys, situated between the Balkan Mountains in the north and Vitosha and Sredna Gora in the south. With an area of 1,186 km^{2} and an average altitude of 550 m, Sofia Valley is the largest and contains the nation's capital, Sofia. The Rose Valley encompasses the valleys of Karlovo and Kazanlak and is renowned for its rose-growing industry, which has been thriving there for centuries, producing 85% of the world's rose oil. The Kazanlak Valley is also known as the Valley of the Thracian Kings due to the extremely high concentration and variety of monuments of the Thracian culture.

Srednogorie region stretches between the Sub-Balkan valleys in the north and the Rilo-Rhodope Massif in the south and from west to east includes the mountains Zavalska Planina, Viskyar, Lyulin, Vitosha, Plana and Sredna Gora. The largest of these, Sredna Gora, is 280 km and reaches a maximum width of 50 km. Kraishte region covers the western parts of the Transitional geomorphological region and consists of two almost parallel mountain groups, Ruysko–Verilska and Konyavsko–Milevska, as well as numerous valleys.

The Upper Thracian Plain encompasses the middle valley of the river Maritsa and has a roughly triangular shape, situated between Sredna Gora in the north, the Rhodope Mountains in the south and Sakar Mountain in the east. The lowland is 180 km long and up to 50 km wide, spanning an area of 6,000 km^{2}. To the east are located the Burgas Plain, Svetiiliyski Heights, Manastirski Heights, Hisar Heights, Bakadzhitsite, Dervent Heights, and the low mountain ranges of Sakar and Strandzha.

=== Rilo-Rhodope region ===
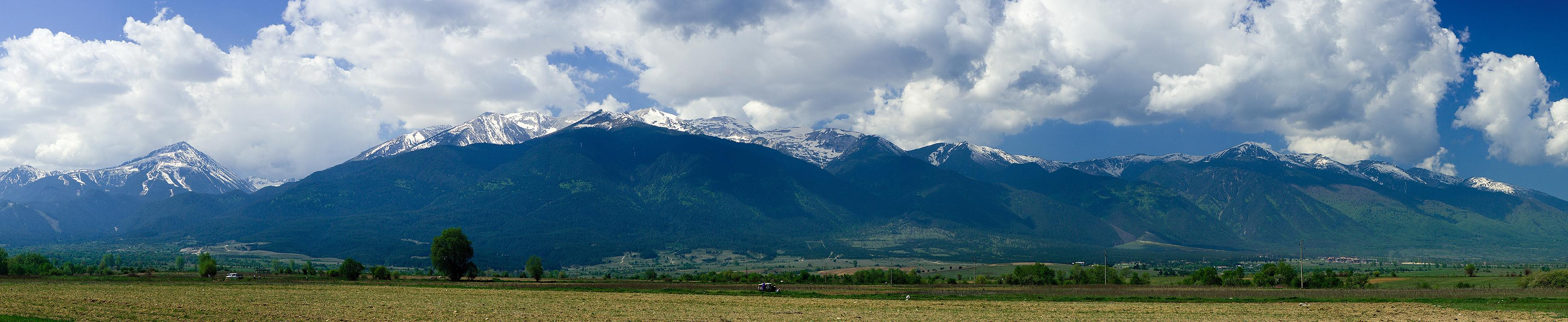
A view of Pirin

The Rilo-Rhodope geomorphological region covers the south-western regions of Bulgaria and includes the Rhodope Mountains, Rila, Pirin, Osogovo, Vlahina, Maleshevo, Ograzhden, Slavyanka and Belasitsa, as well as the valleys of the rivers Struma and Mesta. The Rhodopes are the most extensive mountain range in Bulgaria, spanning an area of 14,730 km^{2} with an average altitude of 785 m, characterized with gentle and densely forested slopes. Their length from west to east is 249 km and reach width of 100 km. The altitude decreases from west to east.

To the west are located Rila and Pirin, Bulgaria's two highest mountains. Rila includes Mount Musala, whose 2,925 m peak is the highest in the Balkan Peninsula, while Pirin's highest peak Vihren at 2,915 m is the third-highest in the Balkans. Both Rila and Pirin have rocky peaks, stony slopes, extensive Alpine zone and hundreds glacial lakes. Further west is the Osogovo–Belasitsa mountain group along the border with North Macedonia, whose highest peak is Ruen in Osogovo at 2,251 m.

=== Black Sea coast ===
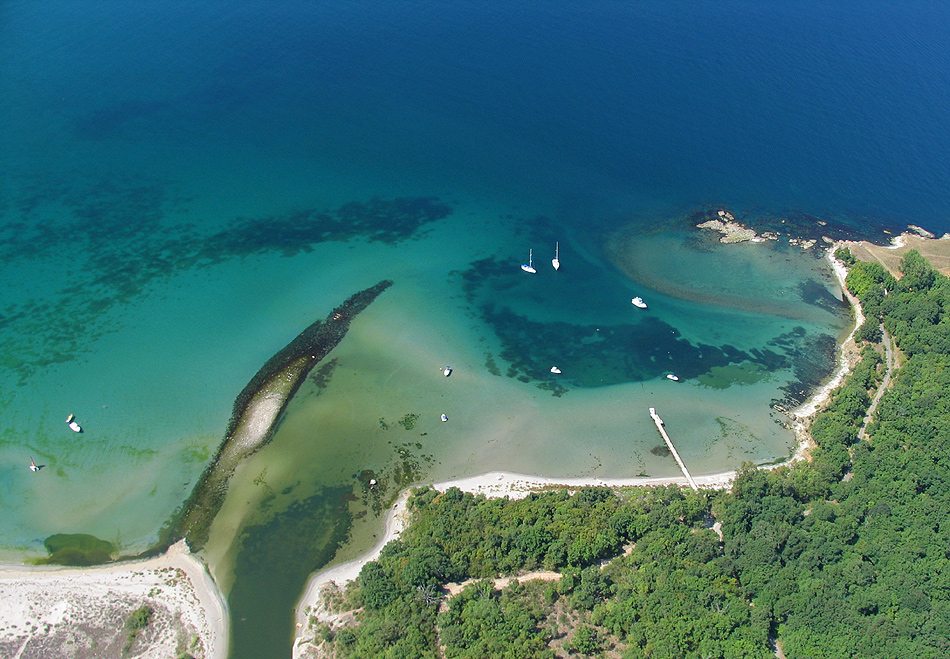
The coastline at the river Ropotamo

The Bulgarian Black Sea Coast has a total length of 378 km from Durankulak in the north to the mouth of the river Rezovska in the south. The northernmost section between the Bulgarian-Romanian border to Shabla has extensive sandy beaches and several coastal lakes, then the elevation rises as the coast reaches Cape Kaliakra, with 70 m high vertical cliffs. Near Balchik and Kavarna the limestone rocky coast is cut by wooded valleys. The landscape around the coast resorts of Albena and Golden Sands is hilly, with a clearly expressed land slides. Dense forests at the mouth of the river Batova mark the beginning of Frangensko plateau. South of Varna the coastline is densely wooded, especially at the alluvial longose groves of the Kamchia Biosphere Reserve. Cape Emine marks the end of the Balkan Mountain and divides the Bulgarian Black Sea coast in northern and southern parts. The southern section has wide and long beaches, with a number of small bays and headlands. All Bulgarian Black Sea islands are situated in the southern coast: St. Anastasia, St. Cyricus, St. Ivan, St. Peter and St. Thomas. Sandy beaches occupy 34% of the Bulgarian coastline. The two most important gulf are the Gulf of Varna in the north and the Gulf of Burgas in the south, which is the largest in the Bulgarian Black Sea coast.

== Climate ==
Köppen climate types of Bulgaria

Considering its relatively small area, Bulgaria has variable and complex climate. The country occupies the southernmost part of the continental climatic zone, with small areas in the south falling within the Mediterranean climatic zone. The continental zone is predominant, because continental air masses flow easily into the unobstructed Danubian Plain. The continental influence, stronger during the winter, produces abundant snowfall; the Mediterranean influence increases during the second half of summer and produces hot and dry weather. Bulgaria is subdivided into five climatic zones: continental zone (Danubian Plain, Pre-Balkan and the higher valleys of the Transitional geomorphological region); transitional zone (Upper Thracian Plain, most of the Struma and Mesta valleys, the lower Sub-Balkan valleys); continental-Mediterranean zone (the southernmost areas of the Struma and Mesta valleys, the eastern Rhodope Mountains, Sakar and Strandzha); Black Sea zone along the coastline with an average length of 30–40 km inland; and alpine zone in the mountains above 1000 m altitude (central Balkan Mountains, Rila, Pirin, Vitosha, western Rhodope Mountains, etc.).

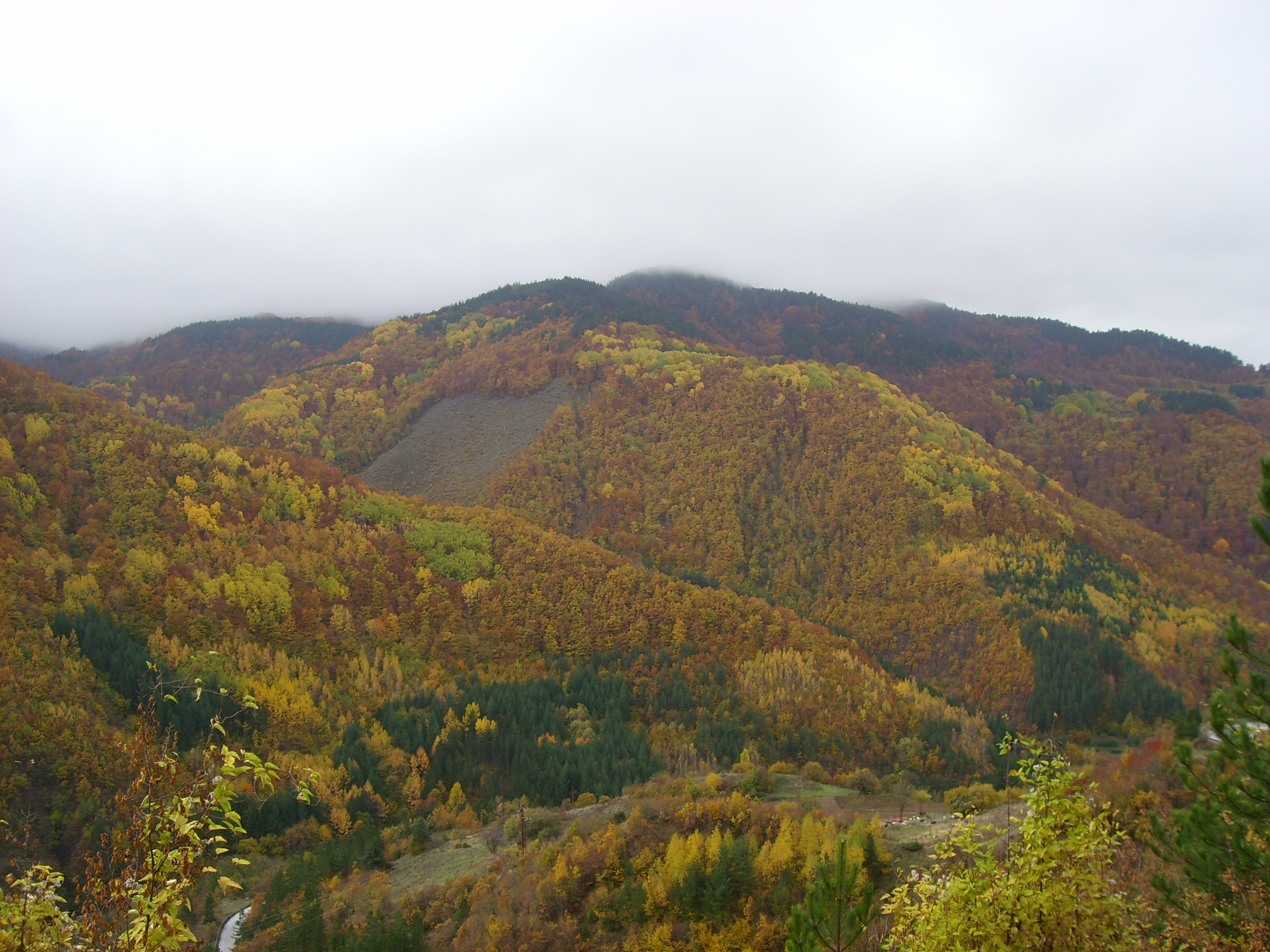
Bulgaria has four seasons. Above Autumn in the Rhodope Mountains

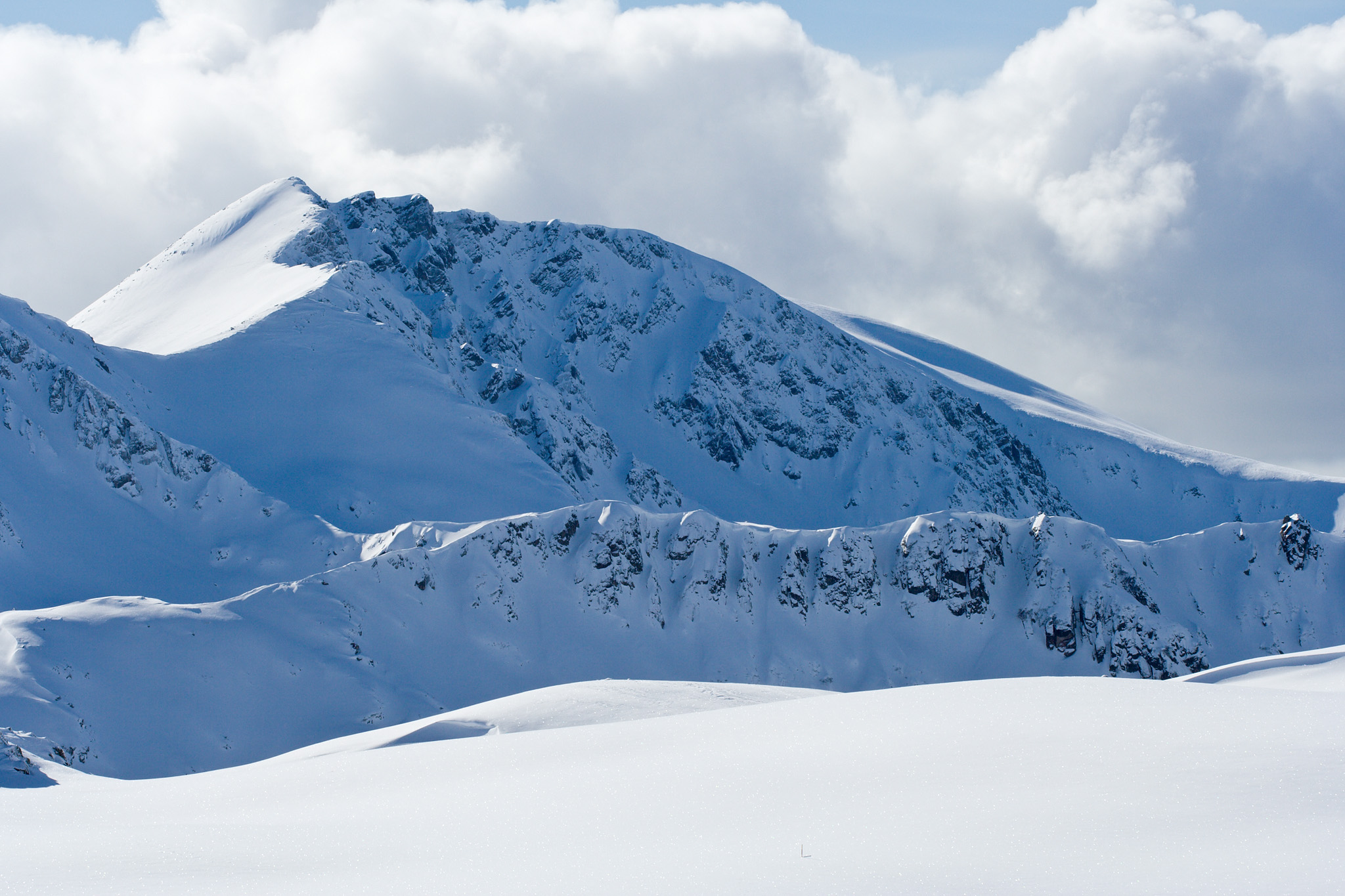
The snow cover in Pirin lasts for nearly 8 months

Despite the large distance, the most important climate-forming factor is the Atlantic Ocean through the atmospheric circulation of the Icelandic cyclone and the Azores anticyclone, which bring cool and rainy weather in summer and relatively mild weather with abundant snowfall in winter. The influence of the Mediterranean Sea is strongest in the southern parts of Bulgaria, mainly through the Mediterranean cyclones. Due to its small area, the influence of the Black Sea only affects a 30–40 km long strip along the coastline, mainly in summer, when the daily breeze circulation is most pronounced.

Another important factor is the relief. The Bulgarian mountains and valleys act as barriers or channels for air masses, causing sharp contrasts in weather over relatively short distances. The Balkan Mountains form a barrier which effectively stops the cool air masses coming from the north and the warm masses from the south. The barrier effect of the Balkan Mountains is felt throughout the country: on the average, northern Bulgaria is about one degree cooler and receives about 192 mm more rain than lowlands of southern Bulgaria. The Rilo-Rhodope Massif bars the warm Mediterranean air masses and limits the Mediterranean influence to the southern valleys of the rivers Struma, Mesta, Maritsa and Tundzha, despite the close proximity of the Aegean Sea.

The mean annual temperature in Bulgaria is 10.6 °C and varies from 2.2 °C at the nation's highest peak Musala to 14.7 °C (1991-2021 Climate data) at the town of Sandanski in the southern Struma valley. The average temperature in the Danubian Plain is 11.4 °C, in the Upper Thracian Plain 13.9 °C, in the lower mountains 8.1 °C and in the higher mountains 2.4 °C. The highest absolute temperature was measured at the town of Sadovo in 1916 45.2 °C; the lowest absolute temperature was measured at the town of Tran in 1947 –38.3 °C. The highest temperature in the lowlands and the hilly regions is in July, while in the higher mountains the warmest month is August. The lowest temperature is measured in January (Dragoman - average monthly temperature: -2, Ahtopol: + 4,2) and February, respectively. Many valleys experience regular temperature inversions and fogs in winter. The country's lowest absolute temperature was measured during an inversion in the Tran valley : −38.3 °C .

The average precipitation in Bulgaria is about 670 mm. It is uneven in terms of seasons and territory. In northern Bulgaria the highest precipitation is in May–June, while in southern Bulgaria it is in winter. The average amount of precipitation also varies in term of altitude – from 450 to 850 mm in the plains to 850–1200 mm. The lowest mean precipitation is in the eastern part of Dobrudzha and the Burgas Plain (450 mm) and in the area between Plovdiv and Pazardzhik (500 mm); the highest rainfall falls in the mountains – the Petrohan Pass in the western Balkan Mountains and Zlatograd in the Rhodope Mountains. The highest annual rainfall was measured in 1957 in the upper valley of the river Ogosta in the western Balkan Mountains (2293 mm); the highest daily rainfall was recorded at Saints Constantine and Helena resort (342 mm) near Varna in 1951. The total annual amount of the rainfall is 74 billion km^{3}; of them 70% evaporate, 20% flow into the rivers and 10% soak into the soil. Most of the country is affected by droughts in June and August. The snow cover lasts from 20 to 30 days in the lowlands to 9 months in the highest mountains.

Climate data for Bulgaria (records from all meteo stations)
Month	Jan	Feb	Mar	Apr	May	Jun	Jul	Aug	Sep	Oct	Nov	Dec	Year
Record high °C (°F)	24.8 (76.6)	26.7 (80.1)	35.7 (96.3)	37.1 (98.8)	38.8 (101.8)	42.0 (107.6)	45.2 (113.4)	44.5 (112.1)	41.9 (107.4)	39.2 (102.6)	32.4 (90.3)	28.6 (83.5)	45.2 (113.4)
Record low °C (°F)	−38.3 (−36.9)	−35 (−31)	−30.2 (−22.4)	−20.6 (−5.1)	−15.6 (3.9)	−12 (10)	−8 (18)	−9.8 (14.4)	−14 (7)	−17.8 (0.0)	−27.4 (−17.3)	−33.5 (−28.3)	−38.3 (−36.9)
Source: Stringmeteo.com, February record high : http://eea.government.bg/bg/soer/2016/climate/climate0 November record high : https://m.dir.bg/weather/novini/s-32-4-c-veliko-tarnovo-schupi-95-godishen-natsionalen-rekord

Climate data for Sofia (NIMH−BAS), 1991–2020 normals, extremes 1893–present
Month	Jan	Feb	Mar	Apr	May	Jun	Jul	Aug	Sep	Oct	Nov	Dec	Year
Record high °C (°F)	19.0 (66.2)	23.0 (73.4)	27.5 (81.5)	31.0 (87.8)	34.1 (93.4)	38.0 (100.4)	41.0 (105.8)	39.4 (102.9)	36.1 (97.0)	33.9 (93.0)	25.8 (78.4)	23.0 (73.4)	41.0 (105.8)
Mean daily maximum °C (°F)	3.6 (38.5)	6.5 (43.7)	11.5 (52.7)	16.7 (62.1)	21.4 (70.5)	25.3 (77.5)	27.9 (82.2)	28.4 (83.1)	23.3 (73.9)	17.6 (63.7)	10.7 (51.3)	4.6 (40.3)	16.5 (61.6)
Daily mean °C (°F)	−0.5 (31.1)	1.6 (34.9)	5.8 (42.4)	10.8 (51.4)	15.5 (59.9)	19.3 (66.7)	21.5 (70.7)	21.5 (70.7)	16.8 (62.2)	11.4 (52.5)	5.9 (42.6)	0.8 (33.4)	10.9 (51.5)
Mean daily minimum °C (°F)	−3.8 (25.2)	−2.3 (27.9)	1.1 (34.0)	5.4 (41.7)	9.9 (49.8)	13.4 (56.1)	15.3 (59.5)	15.3 (59.5)	11.1 (52.0)	6.7 (44.1)	2.2 (36.0)	−2.3 (27.9)	6.0 (42.8)
Record low °C (°F)	−31.2 (−24.2)	−25.0 (−13.0)	−19.0 (−2.2)	−6.0 (21.2)	−2.2 (28.0)	1.4 (34.5)	2.0 (35.6)	3.5 (38.3)	−2.0 (28.4)	−6.0 (21.2)	−15.3 (4.5)	−21.1 (−6.0)	−31.2 (−24.2)
Average precipitation mm (inches)	35.9 (1.41)	35.5 (1.40)	45.3 (1.78)	52.3 (2.06)	73.1 (2.88)	81.6 (3.21)	64.7 (2.55)	53.1 (2.09)	52.3 (2.06)	53.9 (2.12)	38.1 (1.50)	39.9 (1.57)	625.7 (24.63)
Average snowfall cm (inches)	24.5 (9.6)	20.6 (8.1)	14.8 (5.8)	3.1 (1.2)	0.0 (0.0)	0.0 (0.0)	0.0 (0.0)	0.0 (0.0)	0.0 (0.0)	1.5 (0.6)	10.4 (4.1)	20.7 (8.1)	95.6 (37.5)
Average precipitation days	10.2	9.5	10.9	10.7	13.8	10.9	7.7	7.3	8.7	9.6	7.1	10.3	116.7
Average snowy days	7.5	6.5	5.2	1.3	0.0	0.0	0.0	0.0	0.0	0.7	2.7	6.4	30.3
Mean monthly sunshine hours	87.9	117.2	169	195.1	236	268.1	311.9	307.3	225.1	166.8	107.7	69.1	2,261.2
Average ultraviolet index	1	2	4	5	7	9	9	8	6	4	2	1	5
Source: Stringmeteo.com, Climatebase.ru (precipitation days and extremes), NOAA, freemeteo.bg and Weather Atlas

Climate data for Ahtopol (NIMH−BAS) 1991–2020 normals,
Month	Jan	Feb	Mar	Apr	May	Jun	Jul	Aug	Sep	Oct	Nov	Dec	Year
Daily mean °C (°F)	4.2 (39.6)	4.9 (40.8)	7.4 (45.3)	11.1 (52.0)	15.8 (60.4)	20.4 (68.7)	23.2 (73.8)	23.3 (73.9)	19.5 (67.1)	15 (59)	10.1 (50.2)	6.1 (43.0)	13.4 (56.1)
Source: Stringmeteo.com, Climatebase.ru (precipitation days and extremes), NOAA, freemeteo.bg and Weather Atlas

== Hydrography ==
Map of drainage systems and drainage divide in Bulgaria

Bulgaria has a dense network of about 540 rivers, but with the notable exception of the Danube, most have short length and low water-level. The density is highest in the mountain areas and lowest in Dobrudzha, the Danubian Plain and the Upper Thracian Plain. There are two catchment basins: the Black Sea (57% of the territory and 42% of the rivers) and the Aegean Sea (43% of the territory and 58% of the rivers) basins.

The Balkan Mountains divide Bulgaria into two nearly equal drainage systems. The larger system drains northward to the Black Sea, mainly by way of the Danube. This system includes the entire Danubian Plain and a stretch of land running 48–80 km inland from the coastline in the south. The Danube gets slightly more than 4% of its total volume from its Bulgarian tributaries. As it flows along the northern border, the Danube typically varies from 1.6 to 2.4 km in width. The river's highest water levels usually occur during the May floods; it is frozen over an average of 40 days per year. The longest river located entirely in Bulgarian territory, the Iskar, with a length of 368 km and a catchment area of 8,640 km^{2}, is the only Bulgarian Danubian tributary that does not rise in the Balkan Mountains. Instead, the Iskar has its origin in the Rila Mountains. It passes through Sofia's eastern suburbs and crosses the Balkan Mountains through a spectacular 65 km–long gorge. Other important tributaries of the Danube include the rivers Lom, Ogosta, Vit, Osam and Yantra. The longest river flowing directly to the Black Sea is the Kamchiya (254 km), while other rivers include the Batova, Provadiya, Aheloy, Ropotamo, Veleka and Rezovo.

The Aegean Sea catchment basin drains the Thracian Plain and most of the higher lands to the south and southwest. Several major rivers flow directly to the Aegean Sea. Most of these streams fall swiftly from the mountains and have cut deep, scenic gorges. The 480 km–long Maritsa (of them 321 km in Bulgaria) and its tributaries drain all of the western Thracian Plain, all of Sredna Gora, the southern slopes of the Balkan Mountains, and the northern slopes of the eastern Rhodopes. After it leaves Bulgaria, the Maritsa forms most of the Greco-Turkish border. Maritsa's major tributaries include the Tundzha, Arda, Topolnitsa, Vacha, Stryama, etc. The other Bulgarian rivers flowing directly to the Aegean are the Struma and the Mesta.

Bulgaria has around 400 natural lakes with a total area of 95 km^{2} and volume of 278 million km^{3}. The limans and lagoons along the Black Sea coast include from north to south Lake Durankulak, Lake Shabla, Lake Varna, Lake Beloslav, Lake Pomorie, Lake Atanasovsko, Lake Burgas and Lake Mandrensko. Of them, Lake Burgas is the most extensive with 27,6 km^{2} and Lake Varna has the largest volume with 165,5 million m^{3}. The lakes along the Danube were dried to clear land for agriculture with the notable exception of the UNESCO World Heritage Site Lake Srebarna. There are 170 glacial lakes in Rila and 164 in Pirin. They are an important tourist asset. The most renown lakes include the Seven Rila Lakes, Popovo Lake, Banderishki Lakes, Vasilashki Lakes, Vlahini Lakes, etc. Swamps and marshes include Alepu, Arkutino, Aldomirovtsi Marsh, Dragoman Marsh, etc. There are around 2,200 reservoirs with a total volume of c. 7 billion km^{3}. The largest ones are Iskar Reservoir, Ogosta Reservoir, Dospat Reservoir, Batak Reservoir, Kardzhali Reservoir, Ivaylovgrad Reservoir, Studen Kladenets, Koprinka Reservoir, Ticha Reservoir, etc.

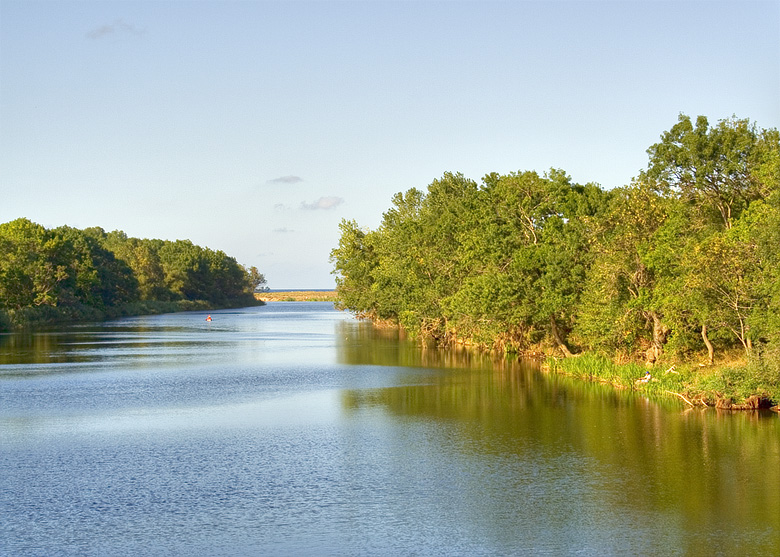
River Veleka

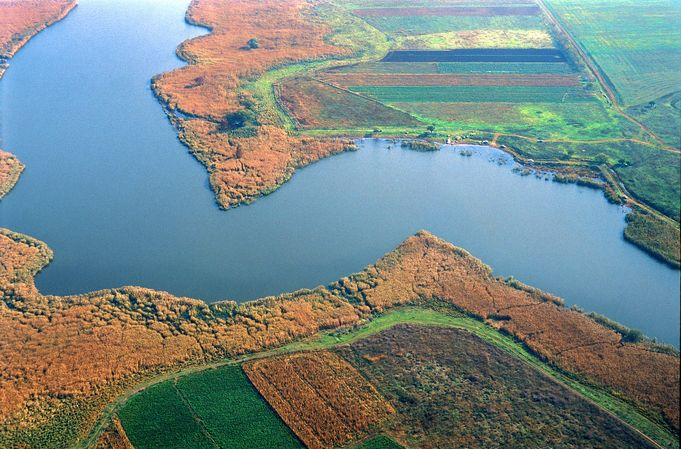
Lake Shabla

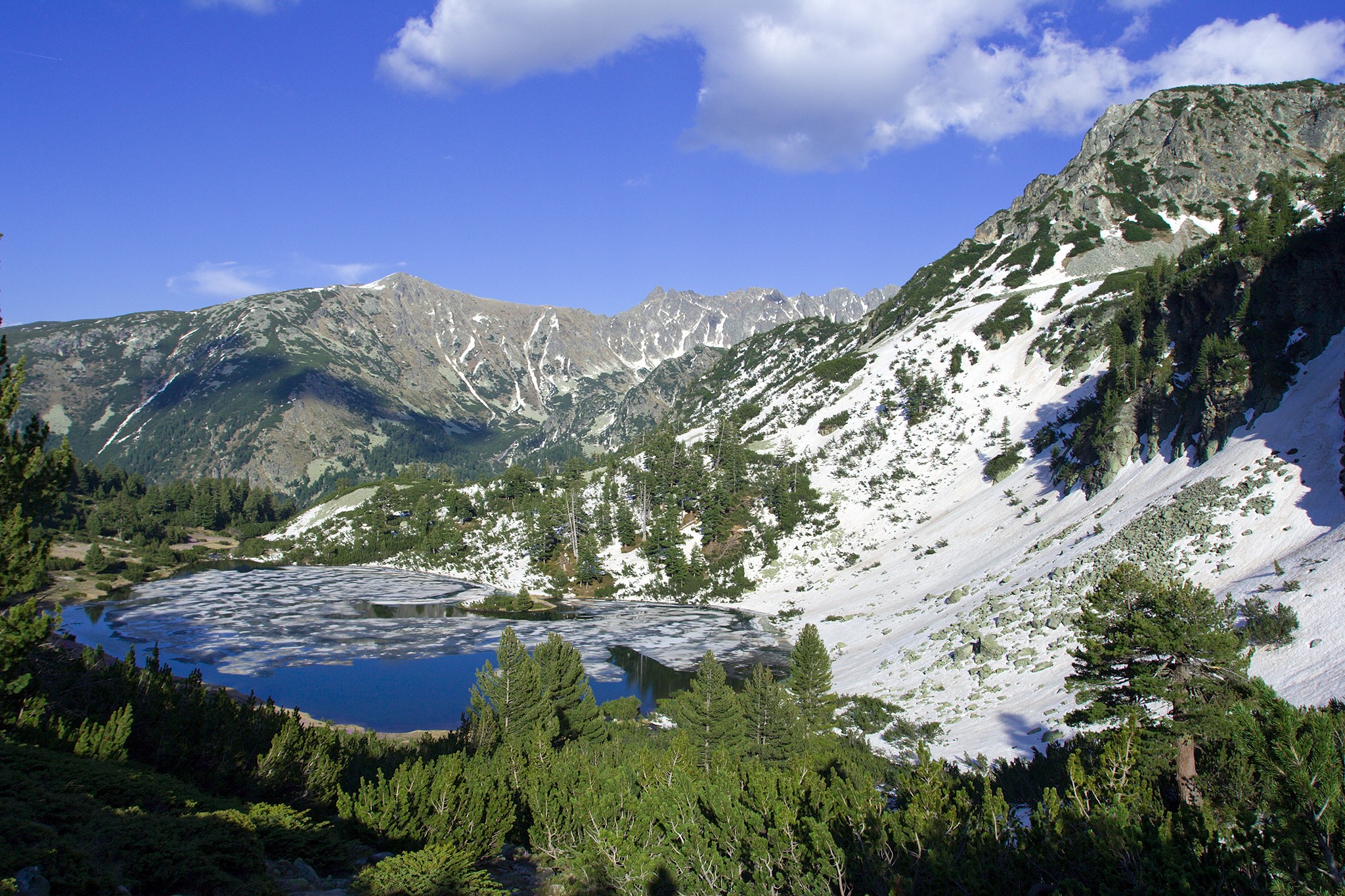
Dolno Vasilashko Lake

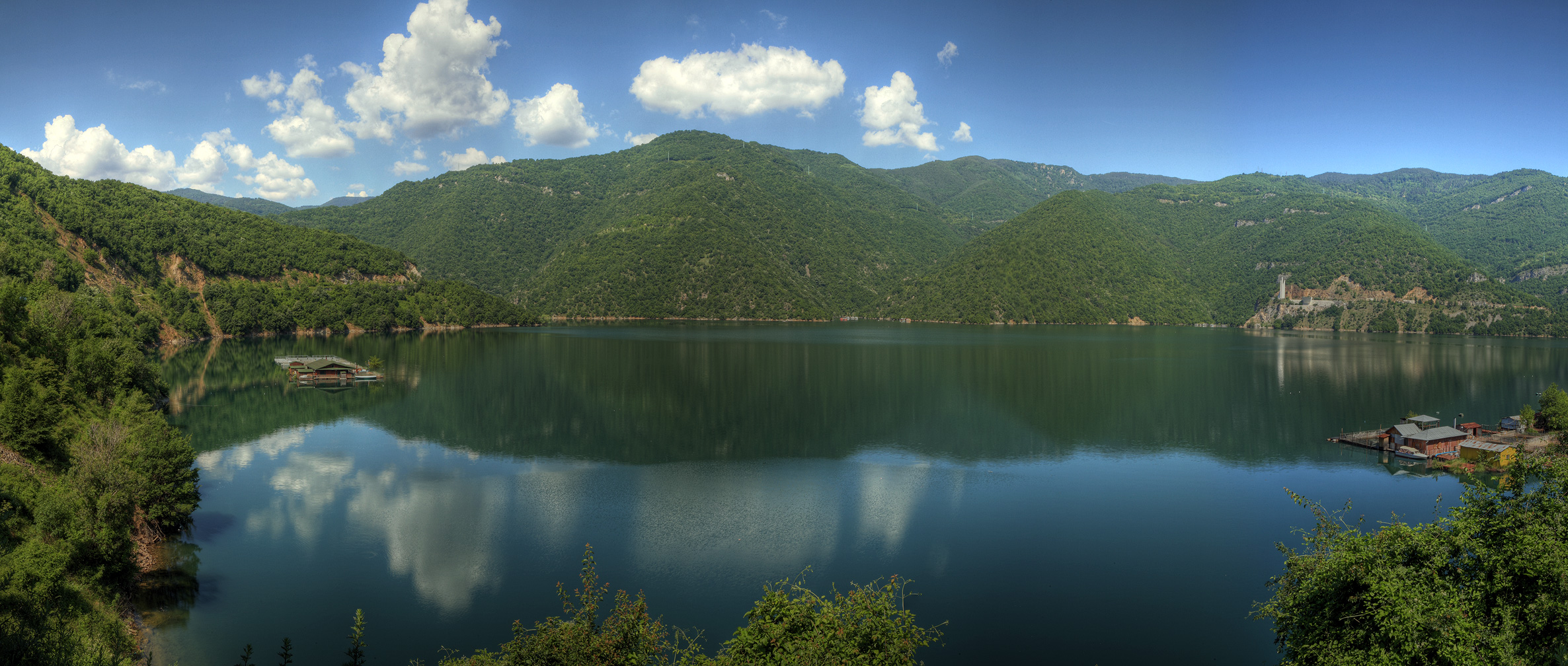
Vacha Reservoir

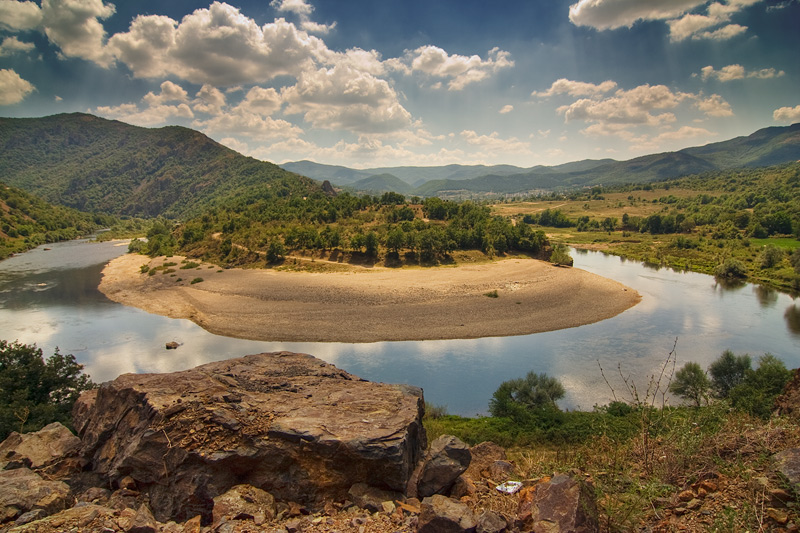
River Arda at Kardzhali Reservoir

Bulgaria is rich in mineral waters, with 225 mineral springs and a total discharge of 5000 L/s, mainly in the south-western and central parts of the country along the faults between the mountains. Most of them, 148, are situated in southern Bulgaria, while the other 77 are in the northern part of the country. The springs in the north tend to be with cool water, while those to the south are mainly warm and hot. The hottest spring in Bulgaria and the Balkans is situated in Sapareva Banya and reaches 101.4 °C. The Bulgarian word for spa, баня, transliterated as banya, appears in some of the names of more than 50 spa towns and resorts. They are located in several zones: Balkan Mountains zone (Varshets, Shipkovo, Voneshta Voda), Srednogorie zone (Sofia, Ovcha kupel, Bankya, Pancharevo, Strelcha, Hisarya, Banya, Pavel Banya), Maritsa zone (Kostenets (town), Kostenets (village), Dolna Banya, Momin Prohod), Rilo-Rhodope zone (Devin, Velingrad, Banite, Beden, Mihalkovo, Sapareva Banya), Struma zone (Kyustendil, Sandanski, Ognyanovo, Marikostinovo, Dobrinishte).

== Soils ==
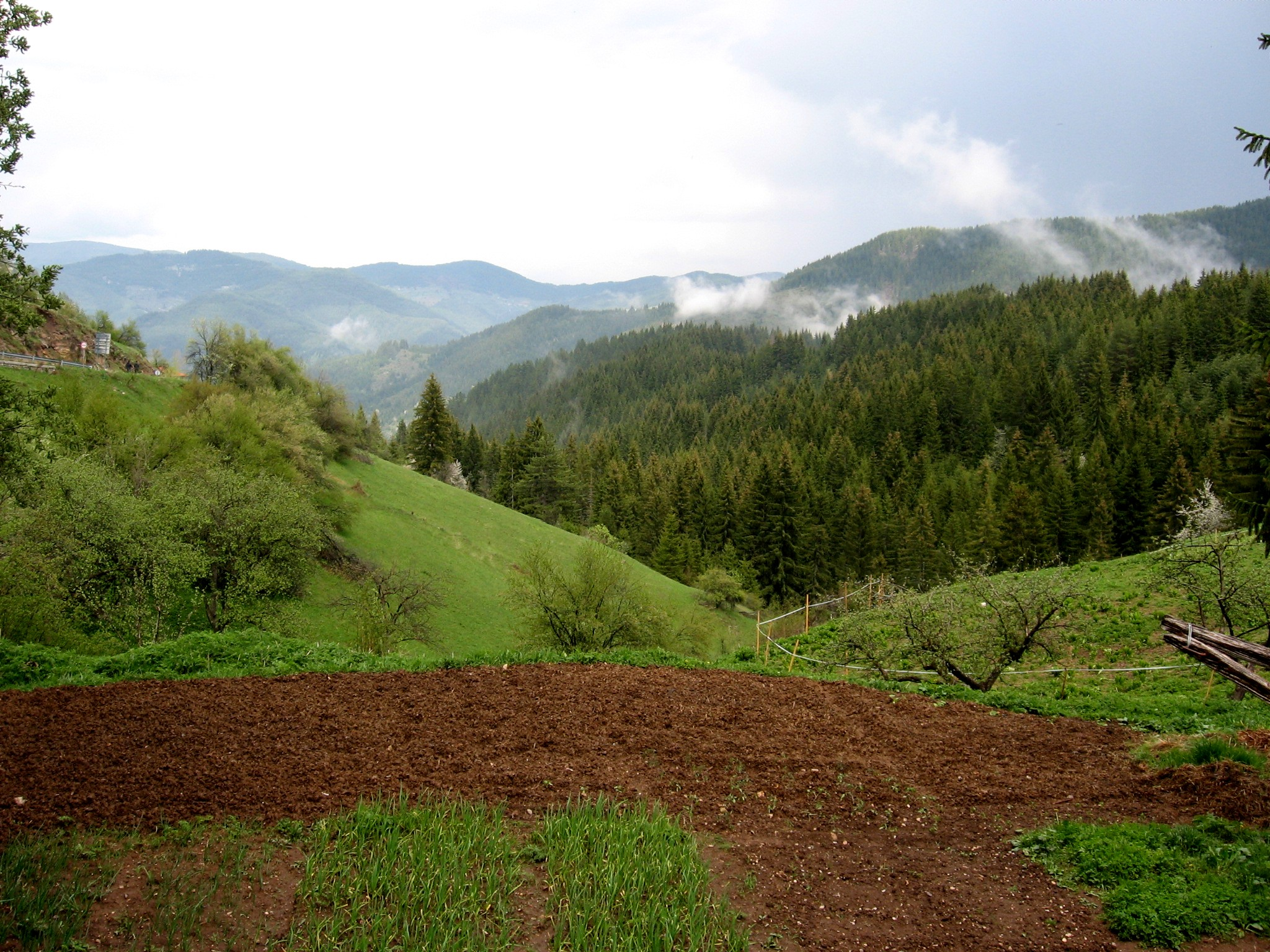
The soils of Bulgaria support both agriculture and natural vegetation

The soil cover of Bulgaria is diverse. The soil resources of the country are adequately researched and include 17 soil types and 28 sub-types. Of them, six types form 88.7% of the soil cover: cinnamon soils (22.0%); chernozem (20.4%); grey forest soils (17.0%); brown forest soils (14.8%); alluvial soils (9.0%) and smolnitsi (5.4%).

There are three soil zones. The Northern forest-steppe zone covers the Danubian Plain and the Pre-Balkan up to 600–700 m altitude. The Danubian Plain is characterised by the fertile black earth chernozem, that accounts for 54% of the zone's area, while the Pre-Balkan is dominated by grey forest soils (39%), which have good physical characteristics but are low in organic matter and phosphorus. The Southern xerothermal zone encompasses Southern Bulgaria up to 700–800 m altitude and includes several specific soil types due to the more diverse topography and climate. The most common soil types are the cinnamon forest soils with acidic (cinnamonic) traces, smolnitsi and yellow-podzolic soils. The Mountain zone covers the mountainous regions above 700–800 m altitude and has a zonal soil cover. The brown forest soils are distributed at altitudes of 1000–2000 m, the dark mountain forest soils can be found at 1700–2200 m altitude and the mountain meadow soils – above 1700 m. These soils are typically shallow and prone to erosion and are usually acid to strongly acid.

Soil types in Bulgaria
Type	1000 ha
cinnamon	2,430
chernozem	2,240
grey forest	1,960
brown forest	1,640
meadow, alluvial and diluvial	995
smolnitsi	595
yellow-podzol	0.026
salty	0.025
mountain meadow	173
other	1,016

== Mineral resources ==
There are approximately 60 types of minerals extracted commercially in Bulgaria. The mineral resources are divided into three groups: fossil fuels, metals and industrial minerals.

=== Fossil fuels ===
The fossil fuels include coal, petroleum and natural gas. Bulgaria possesses significant reserves of coal estimated at 4.8 billion tons. More than 92% of this, or 4.5 billion tons, is lignite, which is the lowest rank of coal due to its relatively low heat content, but is widely used for electricity generation.

With reserves of 2,856 million tons Maritsa Iztok, situated in the Upper Thracian Plain, is by far the largest coal basin in the country. It powers Maritsa Iztok Complex, the largest energy complex in South-Eastern Europe. Other lignite basins include Sofia valley (reserves of 870 million tons), Elhovo (656 million tons), Lom (277 million tons), Maritsa Zapad (170 million tons).

The reserves of sub-bituminous coal are 300 million tons, situated mainly near Bobov Dol, Pernik and Burgas. The recoverable reserves of bituminous coal and anthracite are insignificant – only 10 and 2.5 million tons respectively. However, there is a huge basin of bituminous coal in Southern Dobruja with estimated reserves of over 1 billion tons; but its great depth (1370–1950 m) is an obstacle for its commercial exploitation.

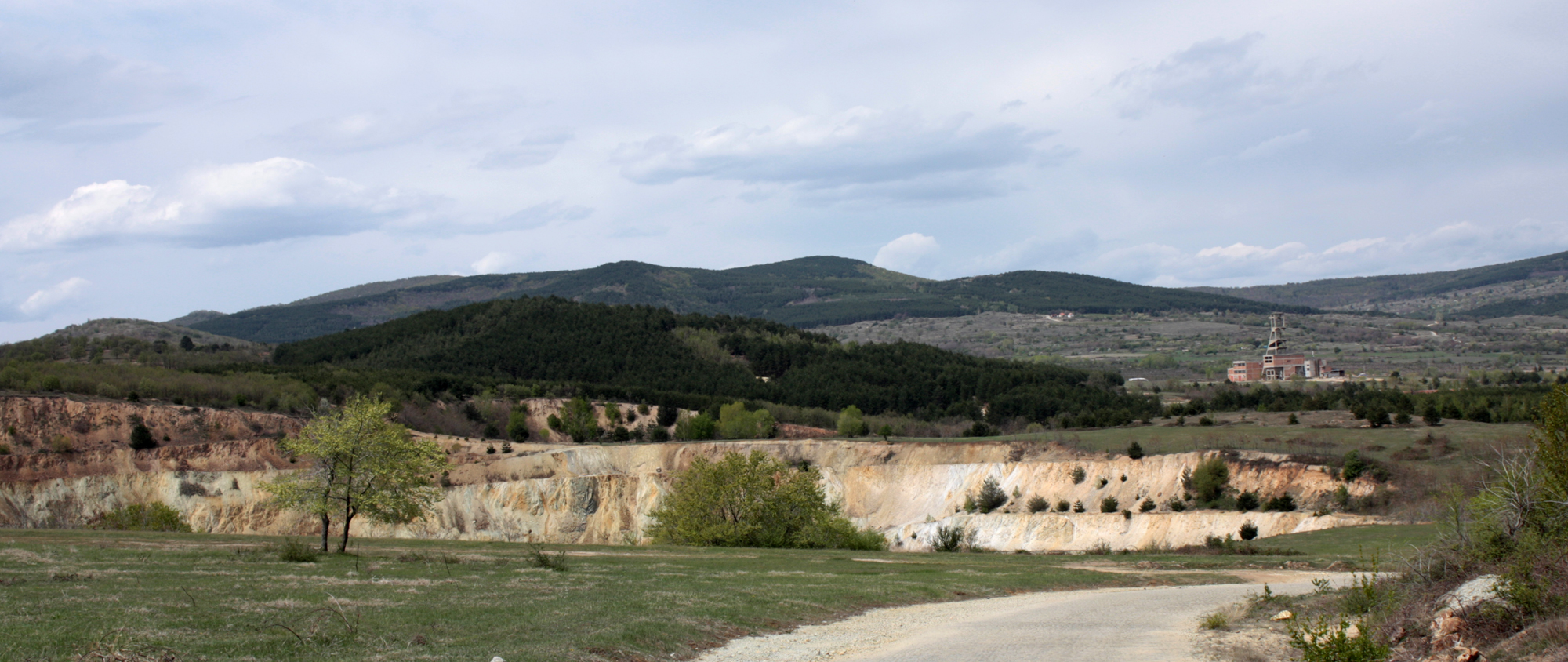
A copper mine near Elshitsa, Pazardzhik Province. Bulgaria is an important producer of copper.

The Bulgarian exclusive economic zone (EEZ) has a total area of 110,879 km^{2} (42,811 sq mi) in the Black Sea. Petroleum and natural gas are found in northern Bulgaria and its EEZ in the Black Sea. Crude oil is extracted in Dolni Dabnik and Gigen in Pleven Province and in Tyulenovo, Dobrich Province. The proven reserves are 20 million tons, but there are prospects for new discoveries in the EEZ. Gas fields have been discovered off Cape Kaliakra (reserves of 3 billion m^{3}), Deventsi (6 billion m^{3}), between Lovech and Etropole (est. 22 billion m^{3}), as well as near Devetaki and Butan. It is estimated that the 14,220 m^{2} Khan Asparukh Block in the northern section of the Bulgarian EEZ has natural gas reserves of 100 billion m^{3}.

=== Metal ores ===
Bulgaria has significant reserves of metal ores, especially copper, zinc and lead, situated mainly in the southern half of the country. The two largest iron ore mines are located in Kremikovtsi near Sofia and Krumovo, Yambol Province with total reserves of 430 million tons. Manganese ore is extracted near Obrochishte in Dobrich Province (reserves of 85 million tons), as well as in the provinces of Sofia and Varna. The reserves of chromium are small and are scattered in the Rhodope Mountains. Bulgaria possesses important reserves of lead and zinc; of these 60% are situated in the southern reaches of the Rhodope Mountains along the border with Greece at Madan, Zlatograd, Madzharovo, Rudozem, Laki, etc. Other mines are located near Ustrem and Gyueshevo. The reserves of copper ore are also significant, situated mainly at Asarel Medet near Panagyurishte, Elatsite mine near Etropole (650 million tons), Elshitsa, Medni Rid near Burgas, etc. There is gold near Tran, Chelopech and Madzharovo, as well as small quantities of platinum, silver, molybdenum, nickel and tungsten.

=== Industrial minerals ===
Bulgaria is rich in industrial minerals, with 70 types being mined. There are important reserves of rock salt near the town of Provadia (4.4 billion tons). Solnitsata, a nearby ancient town, is believed by Bulgarian archaeologists to be the oldest in Europe and was the site of a salt production facility about 6,000 years ago. The reserves of kaolinite are estimated at 70 million tons, situated mainly in north-eastern Bulgaria – Kaolinovo, Todor Ikonomovo, Senovo and Vetovo. Marble is extracted in the mountainous regions – Pirin, Rhodopes, Strandzha, the western Balkan Mountains. There are important quantities of limestone, gypsum, baryte, perlite, feldspar, granite, etc.

== Biodiversity ==
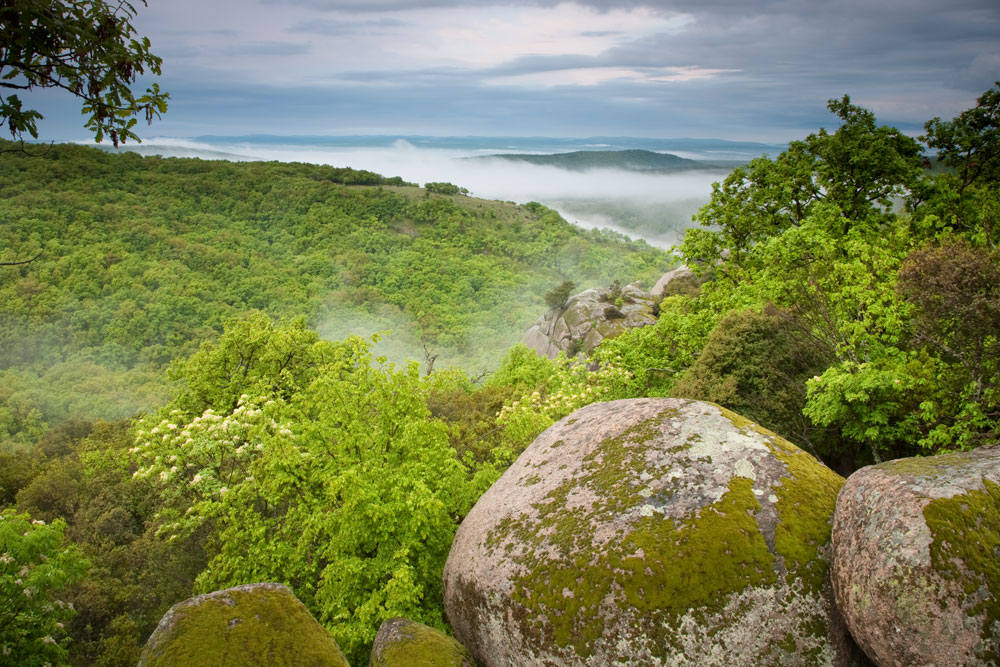
A forest habitat near Strandzha Nature Park, southeastern Bulgaria.

The interaction of climatic, hydrological, geological and topographical conditions make Bulgaria one of the most biologically diverse countries of Europe. Phytogeographically, Bulgaria straddles the Illyrian and Euxinian provinces of the Circumboreal Region within the Boreal kingdom. The country falls within six terrestrial ecoregions of the Palearctic realm: Balkan mixed forests, Rodope montane mixed forests, Euxine-Colchic deciduous forests, Aegean and Western Turkey sclerophyllous and mixed forests, East European forest steppe and Pontic–Caspian steppe. Around 35% of Bulgaria's land area consists of forests, which include some of the oldest individual trees in the world, such as Baikushev's pine and the Granit oak. Bulgaria's flora contains between 3,800 and 4,200 vascular plant species of which 170 are endemic and 150 are considered endangered. There more than 6,500 species of non-vascular plants and fungi.

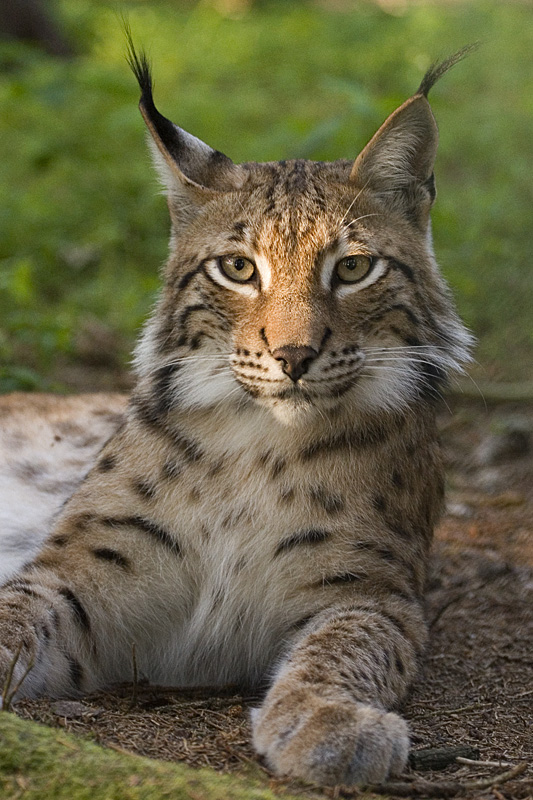
The Eurasian lynx has a growing population in Bulgaria.

Bulgaria's vertebrate fauna is among the most diverse in Europe. Forest cover is around 36% of the total land area, equivalent to 3,893,000 hectares (ha) of 2020, up from 3,327,000 ha in 1990. In 2020, naturally regenerating forest covered 3,116,000 ha and planted forest covered 777,000 ha. Of the naturally regenerating forest 18% was reported to be primary forest (consisting of native tree species with no clearly visible indications of human activity) and around 18% of the forest area was found within protected areas. In 2015, 88% of the forest area was reported to be under public ownership and 12% private ownership.

There are three zoogeographical regions; the Eurosiberian region, encompassing the Danubian Plain and the mountainous regions of the country; the Irano-Turanian Region encompassing Southern Dobrudzha; and the Mediterranean region that includes the Upper Thracian Plain, the lower Struma valley and the Black Sea coast. Bulgaria is inhabited by around 100 mammal species, including brown bears, grey wolves, wild boars, golden jackals, red foxes, wildcats, red deer, roe deer, European fallow deer, European hares, southern white-breasted hedgehogs, badgers, marbled polecats, European polecats, European pine martens, four species of oceanic dolphins, and Mediterranean monk seals. Protection, reintroductions and repopulations like those of the European bison, the Eurasian beaver, and the Eurasian lynx are intended and reported.

The avian fauna is represented by 434 species of birds, which is the second highest number in Europe. Almost all species of the true owls live in the country, also white stork, common crane, and demoiselle crane. Important conservation species are the eastern imperial eagle, the cinereous, griffon, Egyptian and the bearded vultures, the great white pelican, and the Dalmatian pelican.

There are 38 reptile and the 20 amphibian species found in Bulgaria. There are four turtle and two tortoise species of four families – Cheloniidae, Emydidae, Geoemydidae and Testudinidae; fourteen lizard species of four families – Anguidae, Gekkonidae, Lacertidae and Scincidae; and eighteen snake species of four families – Boidae, Colubridae, Typhlopidae and Viperidae.

The ichthyofauna (fish) of the country has not been fully researched, but there is a rich variety of sturgeons, Black Sea shark, longnose spurdog, thornback ray, common stingray, northern pike, European eel, etc. As of 2000 there were 207 fish species.

There are an estimated 27,000 species of insects and other invertebrates.

Concern about biodiversity conservation remains strong within the country. In 1998 the Government of Bulgaria approved the National Biological Diversity Conservation Strategy, which was inspired by the Pan European Strategy for Biological and Landscape Diversity. Bulgaria has some of the largest Natura 2000 areas in the European Union covering 33.8% of its territory. The national policy for governing and management of the protected areas is implemented by the Ministry of Environment and Water. Bulgaria's biodiversity is conserved in three national parks, 11 nature parks and 55 nature reserves. Of them, Pirin National Park, Srebarna Nature Reserve and nine forest reserves within the Central Balkan National Park are included in the UNESCO World Heritage List. Spanning a territory of 1,161 square kilometres Strandzha Nature Park is the largest protected area in the country. Established in 1936 Vitosha Nature Park is the oldest in Bulgaria and in the Balkan Peninsula.

== See also ==
- List of ecoregions in Bulgaria
- List of protected areas of Bulgaria
- Extreme points of Bulgaria
- Reservoirs and dams in Bulgaria
- Rivers of Bulgaria
- List of cities in Bulgaria
- List of mountains in Bulgaria
- List of islands of Bulgaria
- Livingston Island
- Geography of Europe
- Southernmost glacial mass in Europe
- List of glaciers in Europe
- List of European ultra-prominent peaks
- List of the highest European ultra-prominent peaks
- Most isolated major summits of Europe
