= Lake Varna =

Lake in Bulgaria

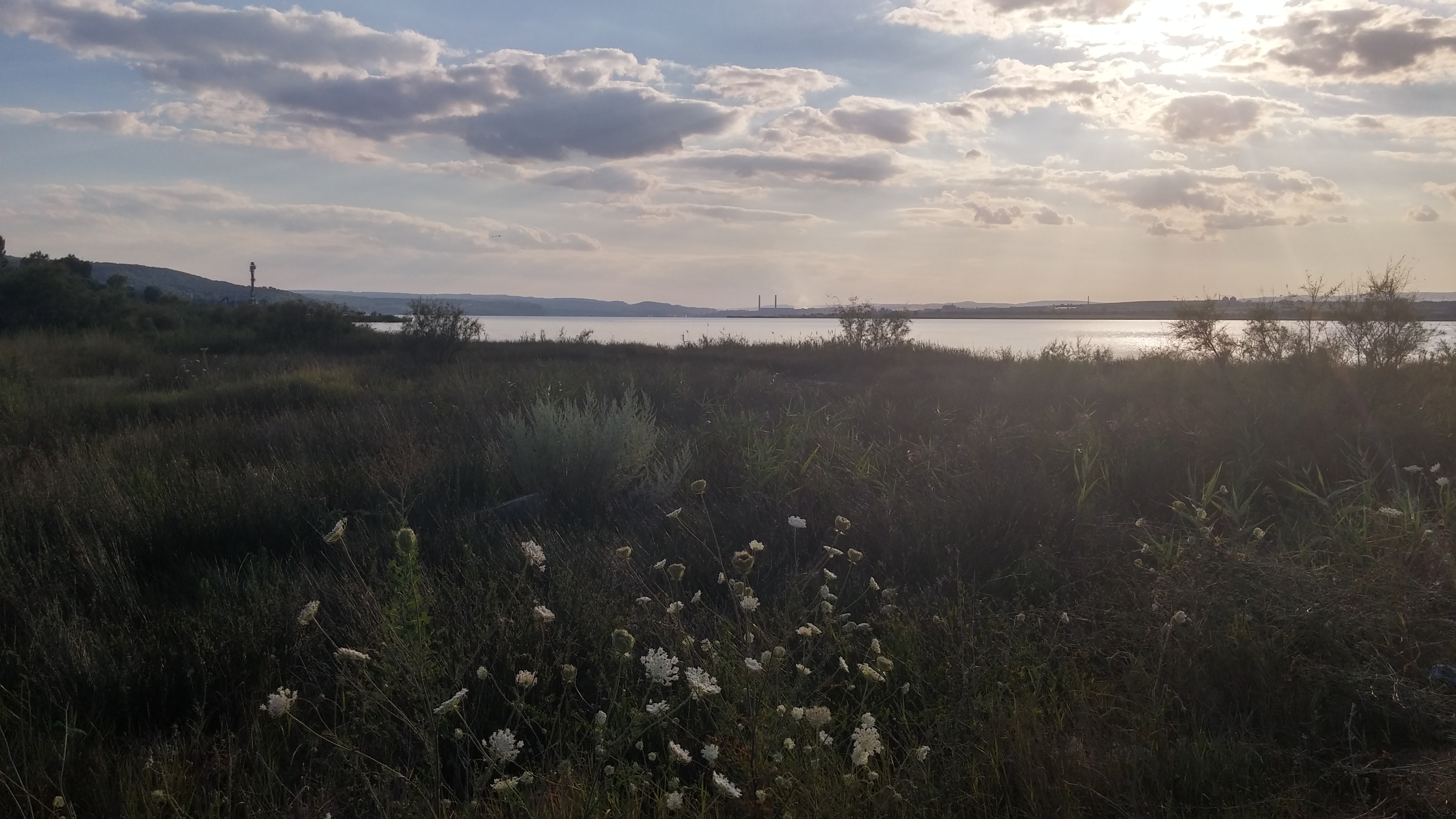
- View of Lake Varna

- Location within Bulgaria
- Coordinates: 43°11′25″N 27°49′30″E
- Primary inflows: Devnya and Provadiyska
- Primary outflows: Black Sea
- Basin countries: Bulgaria
- Surface area: 19 km^{2} (7.3 sq mi)
- Max. depth: 19 m (62 ft)
- Water volume: 165×10^{6} m^{3} (134,000 acre⋅ft)
- Surface elevation: 0 m (0 ft)

Lake Varna (Bulgarian: Варненско езеро, Varnensko ezero) is the largest by volume and deepest liman or lake along the Bulgarian Black Sea Coast, divided from the sea by a 2 km-wide strip of sand and having an area of 19 km^{2}, maximal depth 19 m, and a volume of 166 million m^{3}.

The lake has an elongated shape, its south shores are high, steep and wooded, and the north slant. Lake Varna was formed in a river valley by the raising of sea level near the end of the Pleistocene. Its bottom is covered by a thick alluvium of slime and hydrogen sulphide mud in the deepest parts; there are large deposits of medicinal fango (mineral mud). A number of rivers pour into the lake, including Devnya and Provadiyska that empty near the western shores of Lake Beloslav, which is connected to Lake Varna.

Until the 20th century, fresh water from the lake emptied into the Black Sea through the Devnya River, but following the construction of the modern Port of Varna East (and the subsequent draining of the river), a canal was dug through the strip of sand between the sea and the lake between 1906 and 1909, which led to the lake's level dropping by 1.40 m and the incursion of sea water into the lake, which became brackish.

In 1976, when a new 12 m-deep canal crossed by the Asparuhov most began operating, the lake was dredged along the stream. Another navigable canal to the west lead through the neighboring Lake Beloslav to the Port of Varna West and the Railroad Ferry Terminal. A couple of smaller specialized ports dot Lake Varna's north shore, notably the Port of LesPort and the Port of Varna Thermal Power Plant. Industrialization came at the cost of the lake's reputation of a rich fishing ground that had sustained human settlements for nearly 100,000 years.

The Varna Necropolis, where the oldest gold treasure in the world was found, is located near the north shore, while the city of Varna is situated at the lake's eastern extremity. Also along the north shore are the villages of Kazashko and Ezerovo, and the villages of Zvezditsa and Konstantinovo overlook the lake from the southern heights.

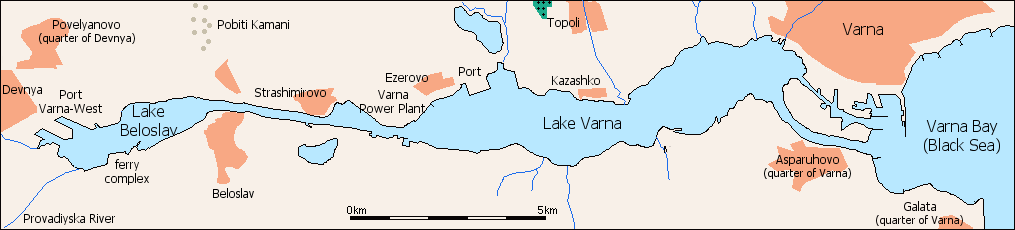
Map of Lake Varna and its surrounding area
