= Varna Municipality =

Varna Municipality Община Варна
- Municipality
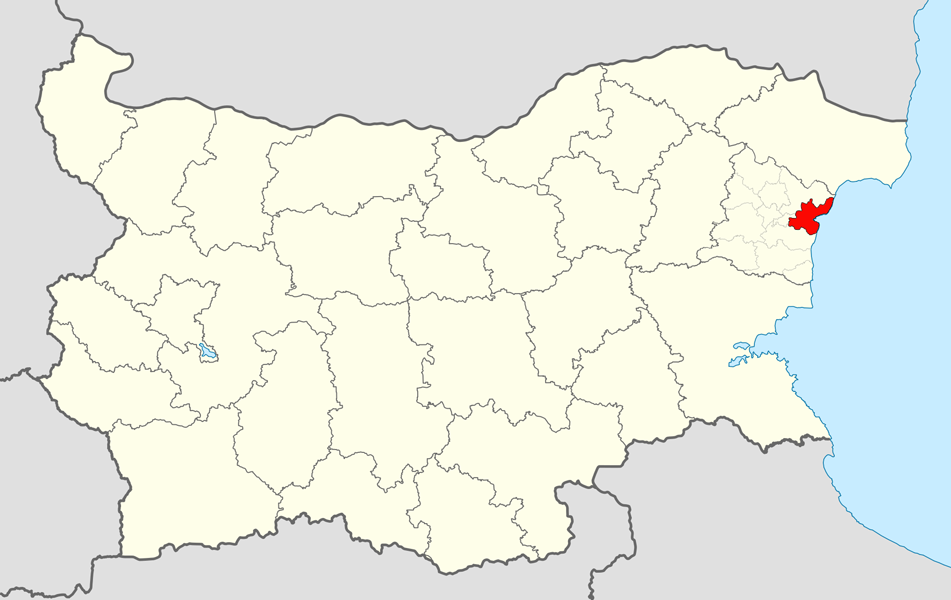
- Varna Municipality within Bulgaria and Varna Province.
- Coordinates: 43°11′N 27°52′E
- Country: Bulgaria
- Province (Oblast): Varna
- Admin. centre (Obshtinski tsentar): Varna

Area
  - Total: 237.5 km^{2} (91.7 sq mi)

Population (15.03.2016)
  - Total: 373,601
  - Density: 1,573/km^{2} (4,074/sq mi)
- Time zone: UTC+2 (EET)
  - Summer (DST): UTC+3 (EEST)

Varna Municipality (Bulgarian: Община Варна) is a seaside municipality (obshtina) in Varna Province, Northeastern Bulgaria, located on the Bulgarian Black Sea Coast and near Varna lake. It is named after its administrative centre - the city of Varna - which is also the capital of the homonymous province.

The municipality embraces a territory of 237.5 km^{2} (91.7 sq mi) with a population, as of March 2016, of 373,601 inhabitants, the nation's second largest municipality after the Sofia Capital Municipality.

== Settlements ==
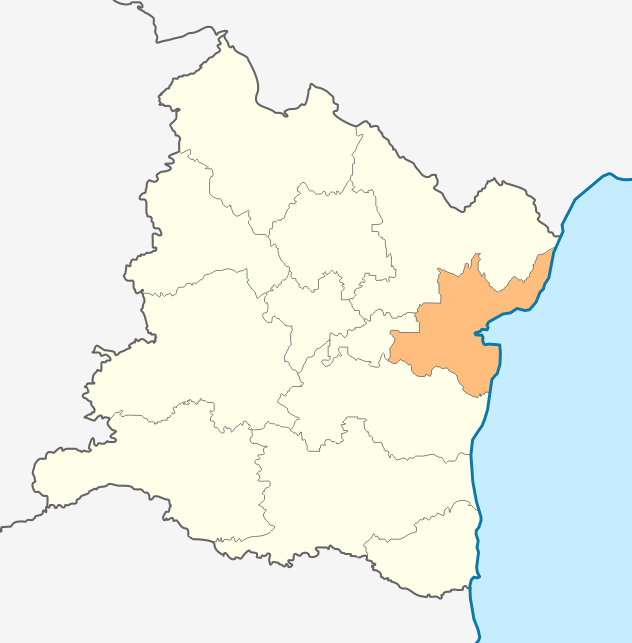
Varna Municipality within Varna Province

Varna Municipality includes the following 6 places (towns are shown in bold):

Town/Village	Cyrillic	Population (March 2016)
**Varna**	**Варна**	365,242
Kazashko	Казашко	362
Kamenar	Каменар	2,783
Konstantinovo	Константиново	1,225
Topoli	Тополи	2,995
Zvezditsa	Звездица	994
Total		373,601

== Demography ==
The following table shows the change of the population during the last four decades.

Historical population
Year	1946	1956	1965	1975	1985	1992	2001	2011	2021
Pop.	101,128	142,499	200,430	269,308	308,053	315,336	320,464	343,704	319,613
±%	—	+40.9%	+40.7%	+34.4%	+14.4%	+2.4%	+1.6%	+7.3%	−7.0%

=== Ethnic composition ===
According to the 2011 census, among those who answered the optional question on ethnic identification, the ethnic composition of the municipality was the following:

Ethnic group	Population	Percentage
Bulgarians	290780	93.4%
Turks	11089	3.6%
Roma (Gypsy)	3535	1.1%
Other	3481	1.1%
Undeclared	2315	0.7%

==== Religion ====
According to the latest Bulgarian census of 2011, the religious composition, among those who answered the optional question on religious identification, was the following:

.

Religious composition of Varna Municipality
Orthodox Christianity	82.9%
Catholicism	0.5%
Protestantism	0.8%
Islam	2.4%
No religion	5.4%
Prefer not to answer, others and indefinable	8.0%

== See also ==
- Provinces of Bulgaria
- Municipalities of Bulgaria
- List of cities and towns in Bulgaria
