= Provadiya (river) =

Provadiyska reka Провадийска река
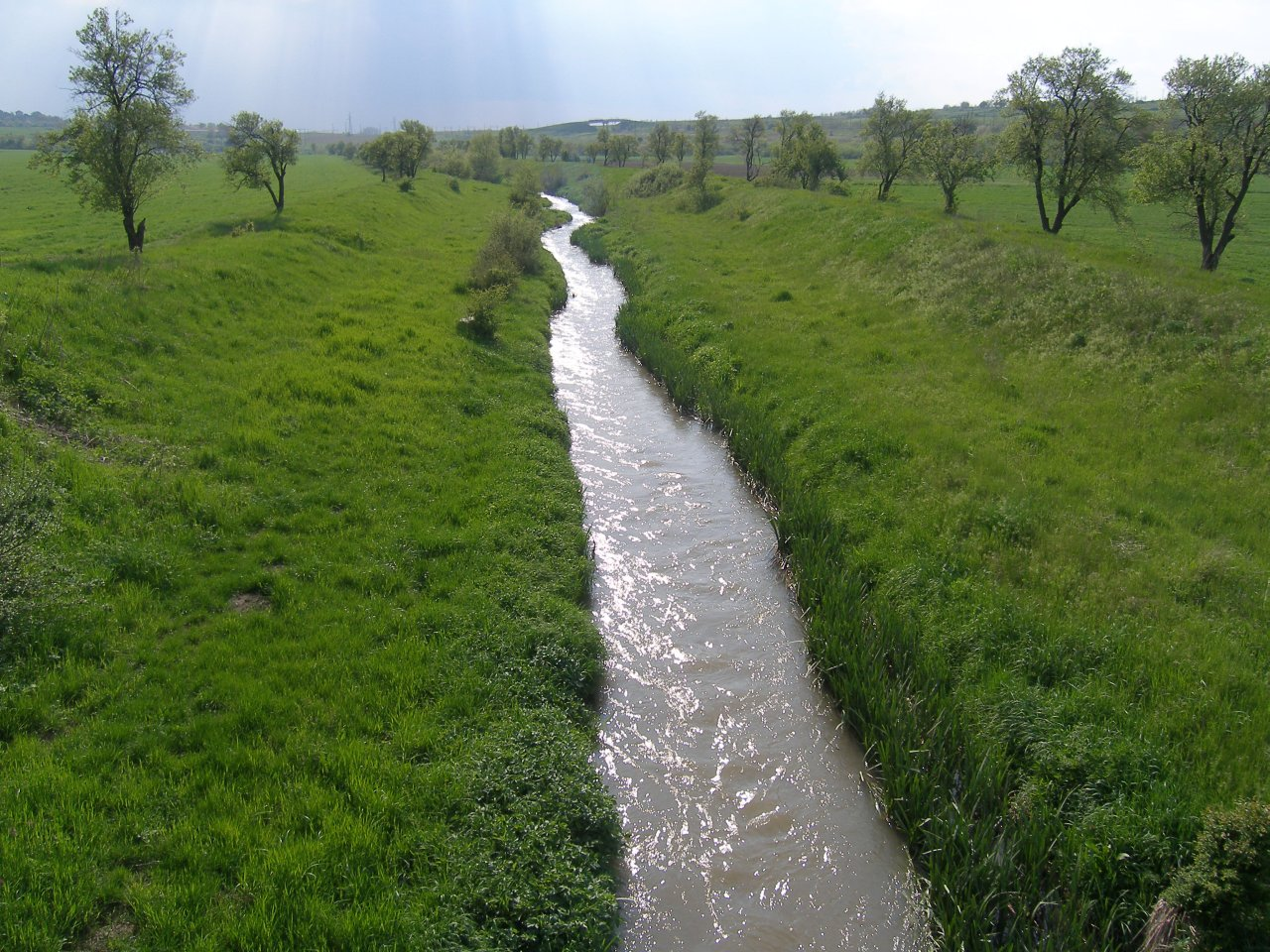
- The Provadiyska reka

Location
- Country: Bulgaria

Physical characteristics
- Source
  - location: Ludogorie Plateau, north of Shumen, Bulgaria
  - coordinates: 43°29′08″N 26°48′35″E
  - elevation: 480 m (1,570 ft)
- Mouth
  - location: Lake Beloslav, ultimately the Black Sea
  - coordinates: 43°10′59″N 27°39′34″E
- Length: 119 km (74 mi)
- Basin size: 2,132 km^{2} (823 sq mi)

The Provadiya or the Provadiyska reka (Bulgarian: Провадийска река) is a 119 km long river in northeastern Bulgaria, named after the town of Provadia.

== Geography ==
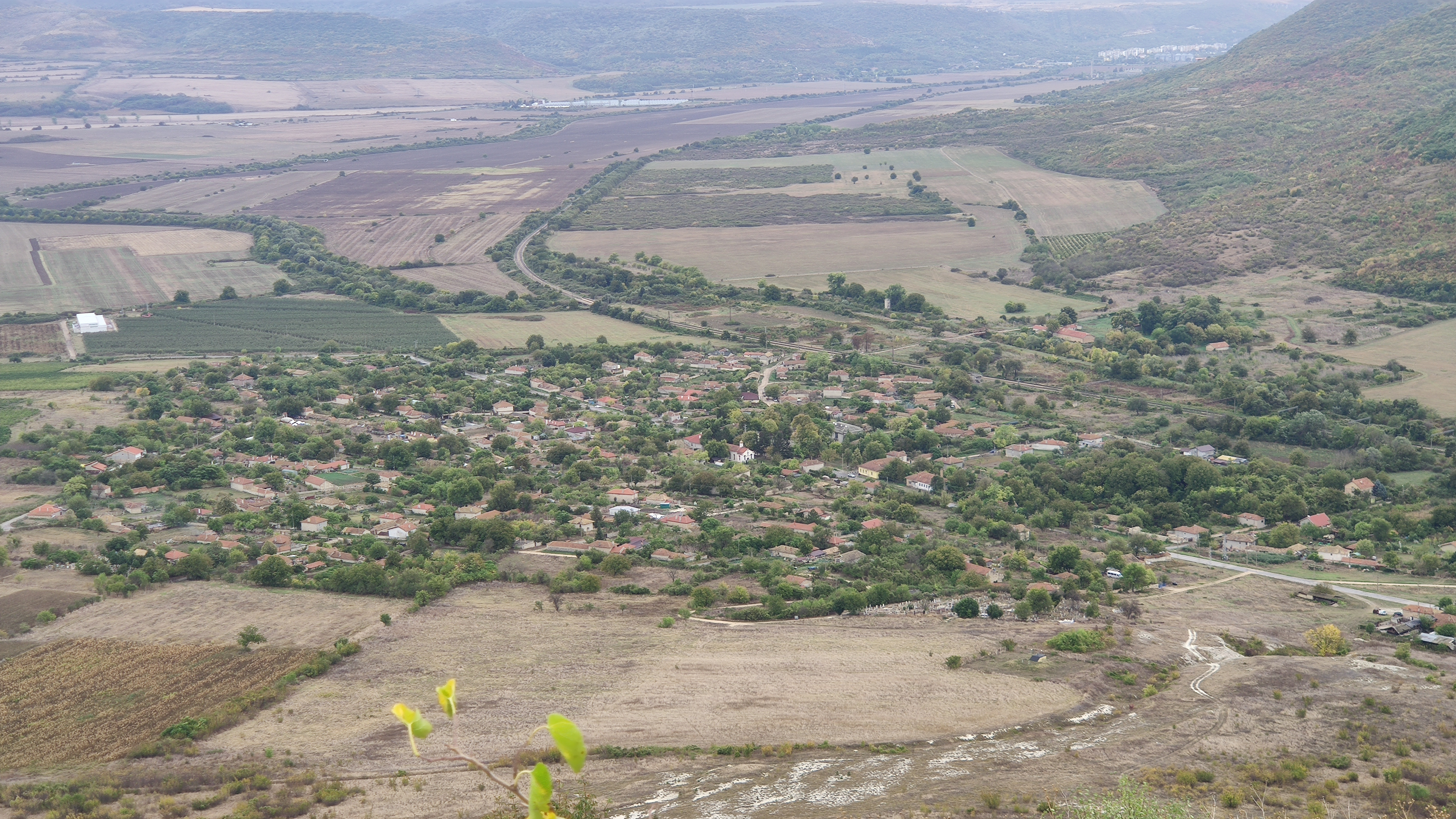
The Provadiyska reka valley at Venchan

The Provadiyska reka takes its source under the name Kamenitsa from a karst spring at an altitude of 119 km at the outskirts of the village of Boyan in the Samuilovo Heights of the Ludogorie region. It flows southeast through the region of Ovche Pole in a wide valley, which narrows and becomes canyon-like between the towns of Kaspichan and Provadia, running between the Provadia Plateau to the southwest, the Stana Plateau to the north and the Dobrinsko Plateau to the east. Downstream from the town of Provadia the river forms a large arch bulging south, then turns north and finally northeast, before emptying in Lake Beloslav some 2.6 km northeast of the village of Razdelna. The lake is connected to Lake Varna, which is itself linked with the Black Sea via a navigable channel.

Its drainage basin covers a territory of 2,132 km^{2} and borders the drainage systems of the Kanagyol, the Suha reka and the Batova reka to the north and the Kamchiya to the south. Among its tributaries is the river Devnya.

The Provadiyska reka has a rain–snow feed. High water is in February–March and low water is in August–September. The average annual discharge is 2.4 m^{3}/s at the village of Sindel.

== Fauna ==
The Provadiyska reka contains several rare fish species, including Dnieper chub, sunbleak, Romanian barbel, three-spined stickleback, Caucasian dwarf goby, longtail dwarf goby, etc. The first two may have been expatriated from the river. It is also the northern limit of the Bulgarian minnow.

== Settlements and economy ==
The Provadiyska reka flows in Shumen and Varna Provinces. There are two towns and 11 villages along its course: Edinakovtsi, Dobri Voynikovo, Hitrino, Kamenyak and Kaspichan (town) in Shumen Province, and Venchan, Zlatina, Provadia (town), Barzitsa, Yunak, Sindel, Trastikovo and Razdelna in Varna Province. Its waters are utilized for irrigation and industrial supply for the major Varna-Devnya Industrial Complex.

Its valley is an important transport route, fully traversed by a section of railway line No. 9 Ruse–Varna served by the Bulgarian State Railways. There two roads along its valley, an 8.9 km stretch of the third class III-208 road Vetrino–Dalgopol–Aytos between Zlatina and Provadia, and a 12.8 km section of the third class III-904 road Staro Oryahovo–Dolni Chiflik–Provadia follows it between Barzitsa and Provadia.
