= Devnya (river) =

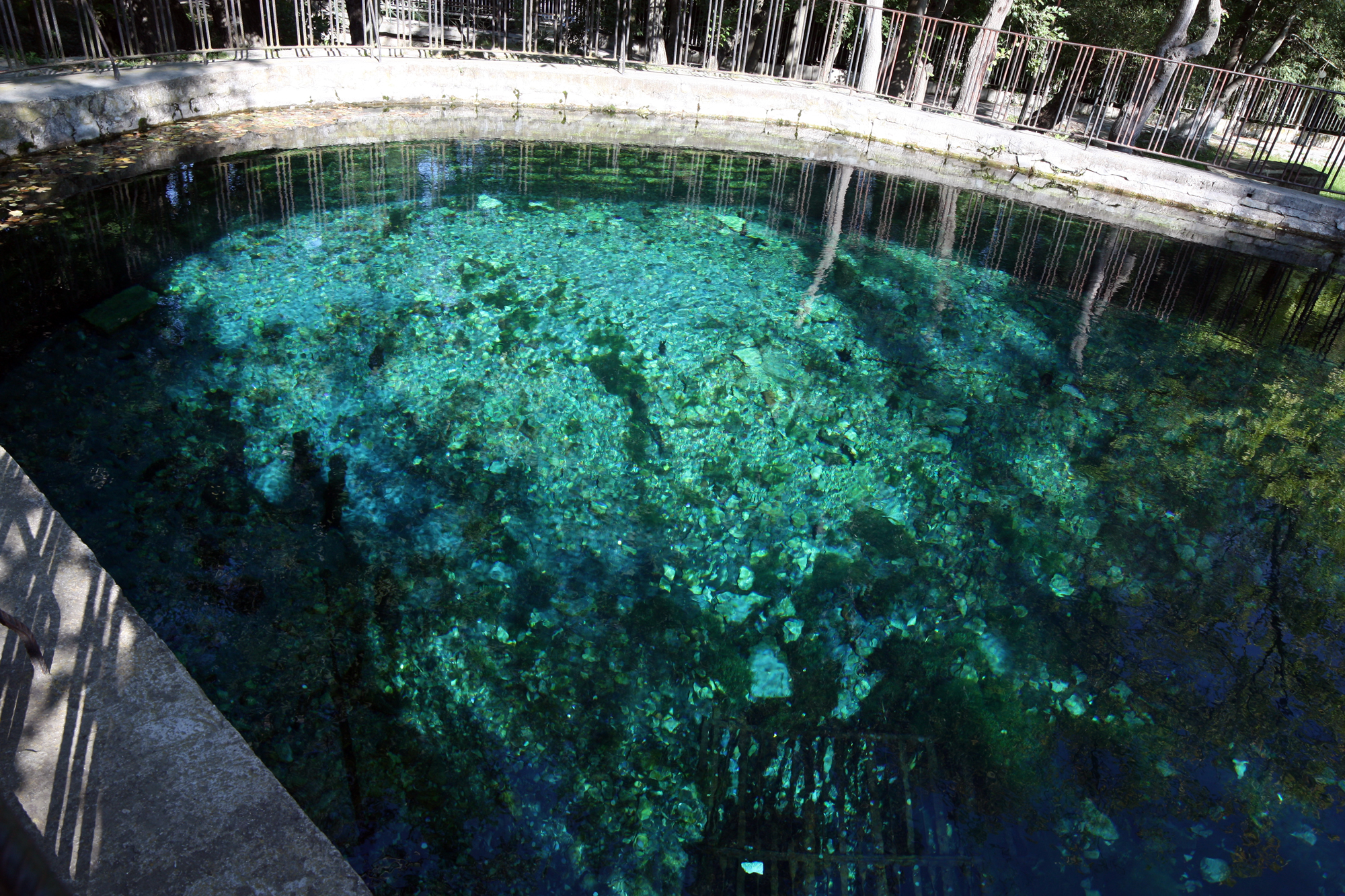
- A karst spring at the town of Devnya

Location
- Country: Bulgaria

Physical characteristics
- Source
  - location: 2 km N of Suvorovo
  - coordinates: 43°21′28.08″N 27°35′15″E
  - elevation: 314 m (1,030 ft)
- Mouth
  - location: Provadiya
  - coordinates: 43°10′32.16″N 27°38′25.08″E
  - elevation: 3 m (9.8 ft)
- Length: 27 km (17 mi)
- Basin size: 201 km^{2} (78 sq mi)

Basin features
- Progression: Provadiya → Lake Beloslav → Black Sea

The Devnya (Bulgarian: Девня) is a 27 km long river in northeastern Bulgaria, a left tributary of the Provadiya, which flows into Lake Beloslav draining into the Black Sea.

The river takes its source from several karst springs, situated north and northeast of the town of Suvorovo. Its main stem is the Mezenska Cheshma spring at an altitude of 314 m some 2 km north of the town. It flows south in a wide valley. The Devnya originally flowed into Lake Beloslav but following the construction of the Varna-Devnya Industrial Complex its lower course was diverted to the river Provadiya at an altitude of 13 m about 2 km east of the latter's mouth at Lake Beloslav.

Its drainage basin covers a territory of 201 km^{2}, or 9.4% of the Provadiya's total. The outflow of the river is formed by the numerous karst springs along the course, including important springs at the town of Devnya, and is almost independent of the seasons. Until 1960 the average annual flow was 3 m^{3}/s. Due to the capture of many of the springs and the water utilization for the nearby industrial complex and the city of Varna, the flow has dropped to 0.5 m^{3}/s.

The Devnya flows entirely in Varna Province. There are three settlements along its course, the town of Suvorovo and the village of Chernevo in Suvorovo Municipality and the town of Devnya in Devnya Municipality. The Reka Devnia Hoard discovered in 1929 near the river close to the ruins of the ancient city of Marcianopolis, is the largest treasure of Roman silver coins ever found, consisting of about 100,000 coins with a weight of 350 kg.
