= Topoli, Bulgaria =

Topoli Тополи
- Village
- Location in Bulgaria
- Coordinates: 43.217°N 27.820°E
- Country: Bulgaria
- Province: Varna Province
- Municipality: Varna Municipality
- Elevation: 48 m (157 ft)

Population (2015-09-15)
  - Total: 3,055
- Postal code: 9024

Topoli (Bulgarian: Тополи) is a village in north-eastern Bulgaria. It is located in the municipality of Varna, Varna Province.

As of March 2015 the village has a population of 3 055.
