= Zvezditsa, Varna Province =

Zvezditsa Звездица
- Village
- Location in Bulgaria
- Coordinates: 43.156°N 27.841°E
- Country: Bulgaria
- Province: Varna Province
- Municipality: Varna Municipality
- Elevation: 150 m (490 ft)

Population (2015-03-15)
  - Total: 1 153
- Postal code: 9103

Zvezditsa (Bulgarian: Звездица) is a village in north-eastern Bulgaria. It is located in the municipality of Varna, Varna Province.

As of March 2015 the village has a population of 1,153.
