= Gulf of Varna =

Bay in Varna Province, Bulgaria

Coordinates: 43°12′N 27°56′E

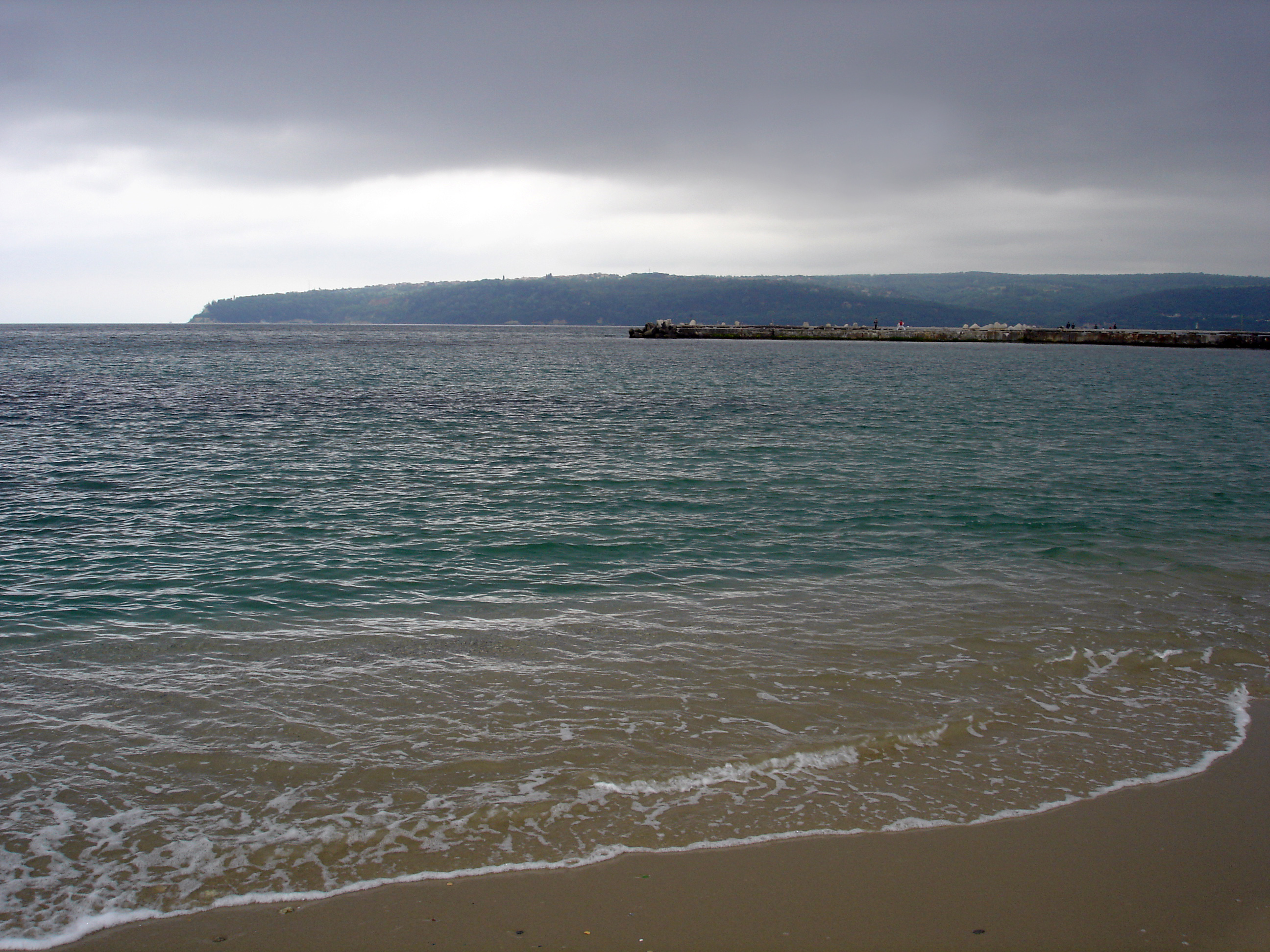
- Cape Galata, View of the Gulf of Varna

- Location within Bulgaria
- Location: Black Sea
- River sources: None
- Ocean/sea sources: Atlantic Ocean
- Basin countries: Bulgaria
- Max. length: 3 km (1.9 mi)
- Max. width: 8 km (5.0 mi)
- Average depth: 10–18 m (33–59 ft)
- Salinity: 17 ‰
- Islands: 0
- Settlements: Varna

The Gulf of Varna (Bulgarian: Варненски залив, Varnenski zaliv) is a gulf on the Bulgarian Black Sea coast. The length of the gulf is 3 kilometres (1.9 mi). Its maximum width is 8 kilometres (5.0 mi), and its depth ranges from 10 to 18 metres (33 to 59 ft). The Port of Varna and the major city of Varna are located on the gulf.
