= Lake Beloslav =

Lake in Bulgaria

Coordinates: 43°11′16″N 27°42′00″E

Lake Beloslav (Bulgarian: Белославско езеро) is a liman, which connected by a navigation canal with Lake Varna. Before the canal was built the lake was freshwater, but now the water is brackish. The rivers Devnya and Provadiyska flow into Lake Beloslav. The area of the liman is about 10 square km, with a width of 0.5-3.5 km, maximal depth 14 m, and salinity of about 10‰.

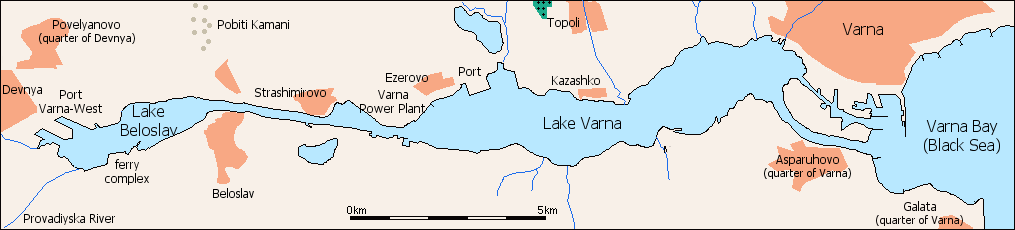
Lakes Beloslav and Varna
