= Konstantinovo, Varna Province =

Konstantinovo Константиново
- Village
- Location in Bulgaria
- Coordinates: 43.163°N 27.779°E
- Country: Bulgaria
- Province: Varna Province
- Municipality: Varna Municipality
- Elevation: 117 m (384 ft)

Population (2015-03-15)
  - Total: 1 296
- Postal code: 9180

Konstantinovo (Bulgarian: Константиново) is a village in north-eastern Bulgaria. It is located in the municipality of Varna, Varna Province.

As of March 2015 the village has a population of 1 296.
