= Varna-Devnya Industrial Complex =

The Devnya Industrial Complex consists of several important factories and companies in the chemical industry sector of Bulgaria. The reason Devnya has become the host of this cluster is that the region is relatively rich in raw materials like water, rock salt, silica, marl, and limestone. Some of the largest companies based here are: Solvay-Sodi (Солвей-Соди), part of Solvay, Agropolichim (Агрополихим), part of the Acid & Fertilizers Group, Polimeri (Полимери АД), part of AKB Fores, Devnya-Cement (Девня-Цимент), part of Italcementi, Thermal Power Plant Deven (Девен АД), part of Solvay, Thermal Power Plant Varna (ТЕЦ Варна, (1260 MW), part of the ČEZ Group. Transportation facilities include Port Varna - West (Пристанище Варна-запад), a railroad ferry terminal with services to Ukraine, Russia, and Georgia, Devnya-Avtotransport (Девня автотранспорт), and several railroad stations.
