= List of bridges in Bulgaria =

This list of bridges in Bulgaria lists bridges of particular historical, scenic, architectural or engineering interest. Road and railway bridges, viaducts, aqueducts and footbridges are included.

== Historical and architectural interest bridges ==
	Name	Bulgarian	Distinction	Length	Type	Carries Crosses	Opened	Location	Province	Ref.
1	Constantine's Bridge destroyed	Константинов мост	Considered the longest ancient river bridge	2,437 m (7,995 ft)	Masonry; Wooden truss arches, masonry piers	Danube	328	Gigen–Corabia; 43°45′48.4″N 24°27′25.2″E	Pleven; Romania	
2	Kadin most	Кадин мост	Span : 21 m (69 ft); Monument of culture	100 m (330 ft)	Masonry; 4 semi-circular arches, granite	Road bridge Struma (river)	1470	Nevestino Municipality; 42°15′22.2″N 22°51′13.4″E	Kyustendil	
3	Old Bridge, Svilengrad	Стар мост	First major work designed by the Ottoman architect Mimar Sinan; Monument of culture	295 m (968 ft)	Masonry; 18 pointed arches	Former road bridge Maritsa	1529	Svilengrad; 41°46′07.7″N 26°11′36.4″E	Haskovo	
4	Ateren Bridge	Атеренски мост			Masonry; 1 arch	Aterenska	16th century	Ivaylovgrad; 41°30′37.2″N 26°04′50.2″E	Haskovo	
5	Dyavolski most	Дяволски мост	Devil's Bridge; Monument of culture	66 m (217 ft)	Masonry; 3 semi-circular arches	Footbridge; Arda	1518	Ardino; 41°37′14.3″N 25°06′50.7″E	Kardzhali	
6	Shiroka Laka Bridge	Мост в Широка лъка			Masonry; 1 arch	Footbridge; Ladja		Shiroka Laka; 41°40′39.4″N 24°35′08.0″E	Smolyan	
7	Bistrica River Bridge				Masonry; 1 arch	Bistrica		Satovcha; 41°37′23.3″N 23°57′08.4″E	Blagoevgrad	
8	Belenski most	Беленски мост	Conception by Kolyu Ficheto; Monument of culture	276 m (906 ft)	Masonry; 14 semi-circular arches originally, limestone	Former road bridge Yantra (river)	1867	Byala; 43°28′10.6″N 25°43′30.6″E	Ruse	
9	Covered Bridge, Lovech	Покритият мост в Ловеч	Conception by Kolyu Ficheto; One of the few remaining inhabited bridge Stores inside	106 m (348 ft)	Covered bridge Wood (current deck structure made of steel)	Footbridge; Osam	1874	Lovech; 43°07′56.6″N 24°42′59.4″E	Lovech Province	(Note: The initial covered bridge of Lovech, built between 1874 and 1876 had a length of 84 m (276 ft), 6 vents and accommodated 64 shops. It was, however, wholly destroyed by fire in 1925. A more modern bridge was constructed at its place in 1931 only to be replaced by a reconstruction of Kolyu Ficheto's design in 1981–82. The current bridge is 106 m (348 ft) long and has 14 shops, the architect being Zlatev.)
10	Lions' Bridge, Sofia	Лъвов мост		32 m (105 ft)	Masonry; 2 segmental arches	Former road bridge Trams in Sofia; Vladaya (river)	1891	Sofia; 42°42′17.7″N 23°19′26.0″E	Sofia City Province	
11	Eagles' Bridge, Sofia	Орлов мост			Masonry	Road bridge Perlovska	1891	Sofia; 42°41′25.9″N 23°20′14.9″E	Sofia City Province	
12	Stambolov Bridge	Стамболовия мост			Arch; Steel deck arch	Road bridge Yantra (river)	1897	Veliko Tarnovo; 43°04′54.3″N 25°38′14.1″E	Veliko Tarnovo Province	
13	Bebresh Viaduct	Виадуктът Бебреш	Highest bridge in Bulgaria; Height : 125 m (410 ft)	720 m (2,360 ft)	Beam bridge Prestressed concrete Twin bridges	A2 Hemus motorway Vitinya Pass	1985	Botevgrad; 42°49′33.9″N 23°47′46.6″E	Sofia Province	

== Major road and railway bridges ==
This table presents the structures with spans greater than 100 meters (non-exhaustive list).

	Name	Bulgarian	Span	Length	Type	Carries Crosses	Opened	Location	Province	Ref.
1	New Europe Bridge	Мостът Нова Европа	180 m (590 ft)(x3)	1,391 m (4,564 ft)	Extradosed; Concrete box girder deck, 4 concrete pylons 124+3x180+124	I-1 road European route E79; Railway bridge Danube	2013	Vidin–Calafat; 44°00′08.8″N 22°56′54.5″E	Vidin Province; Romania	(Note: The road part of the New Europe Bridge is 1,391 m (4,564 ft) long, the railway part is longer with its access viaducts measuring 1,791 m (5,876 ft).)
2	Hemus Highway Viaduct (km 27.5)		162 m (531 ft)	362 m (1,188 ft)	Box girder Steel; Twin bridges 100+162+100	A2 Hemus motorway European route E79	1986	Botevgrad; 42°48′11.9″N 23°48′36.6″E	Sofia Province	
3	Danube Bridge	Мост на дружбата	160 m (520 ft)(x4)	2,223 m (7,293 ft)	Truss; Steel, 2 levels Vertical-lift bridge 2x160+86+2x160	I-2 road European route E70; European route E85; Railway bridge Danube	1954	Ruse–Giurgiu; 43°53′16.5″N 26°00′24.1″E	Ruse; Romania	
4	Asparuhov Bridge	Аспарухов мост	160 m (520 ft)	2,050 m (6,730 ft)	Box girder Steel; 80+160+80	A5 Cherno More motorway European route E87; Lake Varna; Black Sea	1976	Varna; 43°11′25.7″N 27°53′5.9″E	Varna Province	
5	Hemus Highway Viaduct (km 48)		140 m (460 ft)	656 m (2,152 ft)	Box girder Prestressed concrete 130+140+130+120	A2 Hemus motorway European route E79	1999	Pravets; 42°55′23.9″N 23°55′19.5″E	Sofia Province	

== Notes and references ==
- Notes
- Nicolas Janberg. "International Database for Civil and Structural Engineering". Structurae.com.
- Others references

== See also ==
- List of crossings of the Danube
- Transport in Bulgaria
- Highways in Bulgaria
- Rail transport in Bulgaria
- Geography of Bulgaria
