= Califat Coal Mine =

Coordinates: 52.7508°N 1.3903°W

The Califat Coal Mine began in 1852, when William Worswick signed a lease with Wyggeston Hospital, Leicester. The Coleorton No 2 Colliery was then sunk. It was named after the town of Calafat, now in Romania, then in the Ottoman Empire, which was under siege by Russian forces. The site has been subject to various excavations and restorations since the 1960s.

== Coleorton Colliery Company ==
The Coleorton Colliery Company, owned by William Walker and William Worswick, sank three coal mines:

- Coleorton No.1, opposite what is now the New Inn, Peggs Green. It was sunk in 1849, the year of the Californian Gold Rush, hence the name California. The mine closed in early 1870s.
- Coleorton No 2, known as Califat, open from 1854 to early 1870s.
- Coleorton No 3, known as the Bug and Wink, in Pitt Lane, Coleorton this is now the site of Coleorton Wood.

== Califat ==
The coal mine was sunk in 1854, when the Imperial Russian Army advanced along the River Danube to lay siege to the town of Calafat (in modern-day Romania). The mine was named after the town but the spelling was changed from Calafat to Califat.

The Califat mine used the boiler of a Newcomen atmospheric engine as a water reservoir. This was left behind when the mine closed and the mining machinery removed. During the Second World War a member of the Home Guard threw a hand grenade into the boiler, which damaged it.

The boiler was rediscovered in 1969 and excavated by Leicestershire Industrial History Society and with Wyggeston Hospital’s permission was transferred to Leicestershire Museums Service at Abbey Pumping Station. During the 1990s the boiler was transferred to Snibston Discovery Museum. In 2012 the boiler returned to the Califat Spinney where it has been on loan to Swannington Heritage Trust.

There are two engine house complexes in the Califat mine, the easterly one was named Alabama. It is believed it was named after the CSS Alabama that sank or captured sixty-four United States merchantmen during the American Civil War.

Leicestershire Industrial History Society excavated the engine house between 1993 and 1999 before filling in the excavations with bricks from the dig. Nearby there is a memorial to the three miners who lost their lives when the mine flooded in October 1863.

== Excavation of Califat Engine House ==
Leicestershire Industrial History Society excavated the western engine house complex from 2006 to 2019. Swannington Heritage Trust arranged the consolidation of the engine house and boiler house structures with financial assistance from Leicestershire National Union of Miners, Trusts and an anonymous donor.

== Excavation of Miners’ Cottages from 2016 ==
Leicestershire Industrial History Society the miners’ cottage from 2016 to 2019. The cottages would have been built when the mine was sunk in 1854 and were demolished in about 1958 after an Environmental Health report emphasised their poor condition. The Trust are processing a collection of artefacts from the excavation.
