= Petrohan Pass =

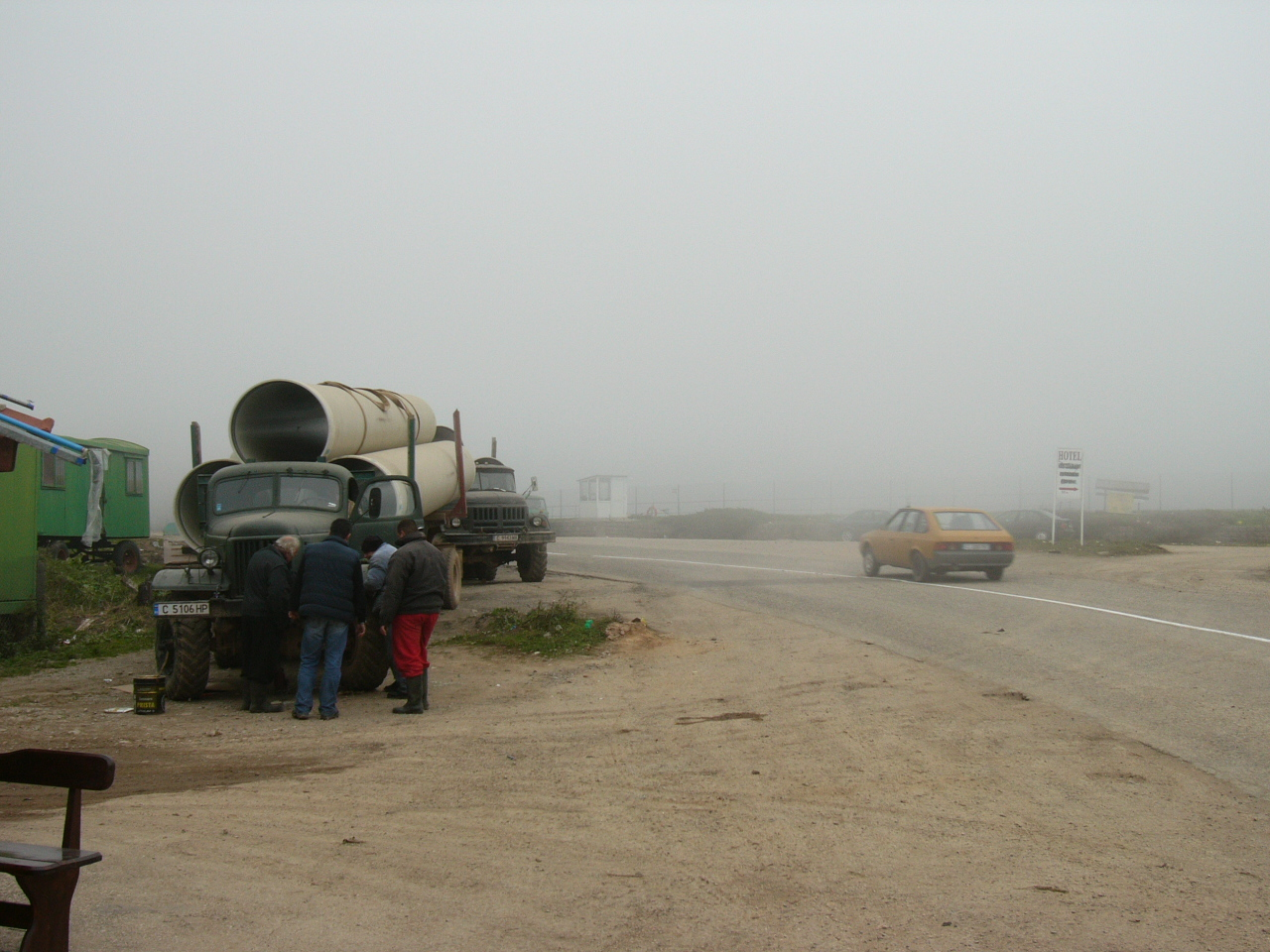
- Interactive map of Petrohan Pass
- Elevation: 1,409 m (4,623 ft)
- Length: 24.1 km (15.0 mi)
- Traversed by: Republic Road II-81

Location
- Location: Bulgaria
- Range: Western Balkan Mountains
- Coordinates: 43°7′21″N 23°7′31″E

Petrohan Pass (Bulgarian: Петрохански проход, Petrohanski prohod) is a mountain pass in the Balkan Mountains (Stara Planina) in Bulgaria. It connects Sofia and Montana. The pass is part of Pan-European Corridor IV. As the pass represents the shortest route between Sofia and north-western Bulgaria (and from there Romania, especially since the opening of the Vidin–Calafat Bridge) the expansion of the narrow road passing through the pass has been suggested, including by the construction of a tunnel.

== See also ==
- Shipka Pass
- Troyan Pass
- Roads in Bulgaria
- Geography of Bulgaria
