= Danube Bridge =

Bridge connecting Romania and Bulgaria

Giurgiu–Ruse Bridge
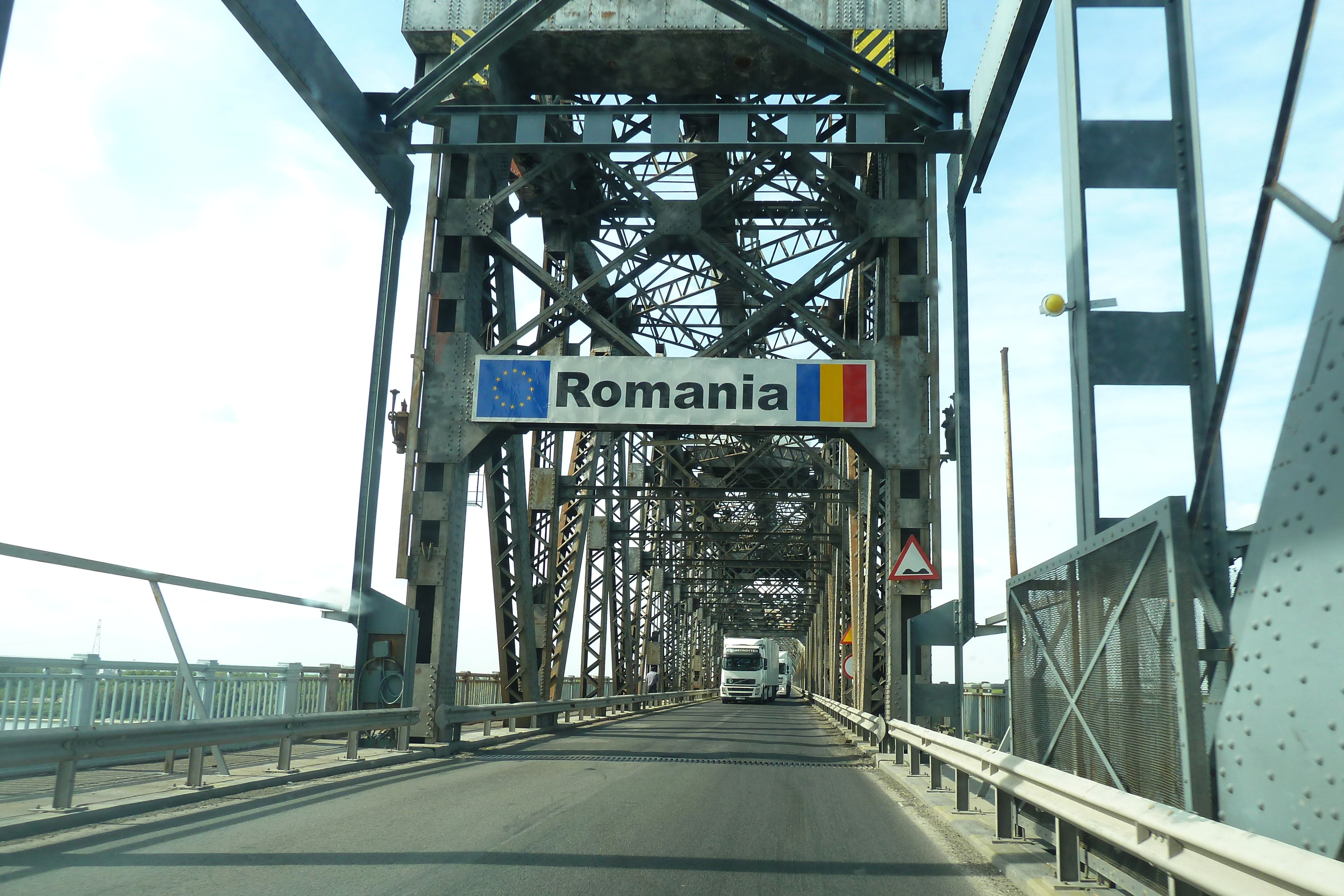
- Coordinates: 43°53′22″N 26°0′19″E
- Carries: Two lanes of road and railway traffic, pedestrians
- Crosses: Danube
- Locale: Between Giurgiu, Romania and Ruse, Bulgaria, at river kilometre 488.70
- Other name: Friendship Bridge

Characteristics
- Design: Truss bridge
- Total length: 2,223 m (7,293 ft)
- Clearance below: 30 m (98 ft)

History
- Designer: V. Andreev; N. Rudomazin; Georgi Ovcharov (decoration)
- Construction start: 1952; 74 years ago
- Opened: 20 June 1954; 72 years ago

Location
- Interactive map of Giurgiu–Ruse Bridge

The Danube Bridge (also known as the Friendship Bridge; Bulgarian: Мост на дружбата, Most na druzhbata or, more commonly, Дунав мост, Dunav most; Romanian: Podul Prieteniei or Podul de la Giurgiu) is a steel truss bridge over the Danube River connecting the Bulgarian bank to the south with the Romanian bank to the north and the cities of Ruse and Giurgiu respectively. It is one of only two bridges connecting Romania and Bulgaria, the other one being the New Europe Bridge between the cities of Vidin and Calafat.

== History ==
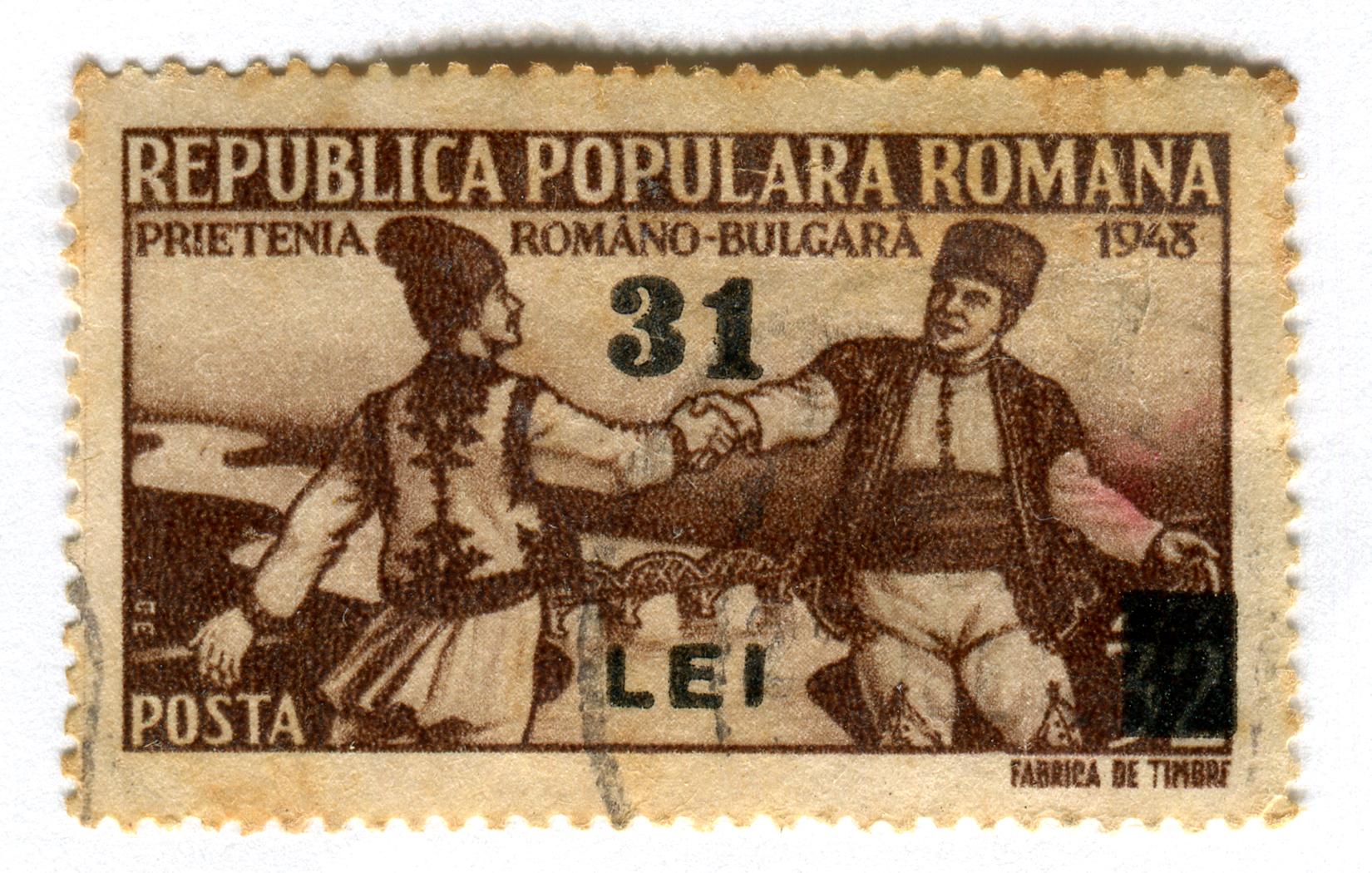
The projected bridge on a 1948 stamp

Opened on 20 June 1954 and designed by Soviet engineers V. Andreev and N. Rudomazin, the bridge is 2,223.52 m (7,295.0 ft) long and was, at the time, the only bridge over the Danube shared by Bulgaria and Romania, with other traffic being served by ferries and land routes. Decorations were designed by Bulgarian architect Georgi Ovcharov. The bridge has two decks; a two lane motorway and a railway. Sidewalks for pedestrians are also included. The central part of the bridge (85 m) includes a mobile lower (railway) deck that can be lifted for oversized boats passage. The maintenance of the mobile part is Romania's responsibility and is periodically checked. The bridge was constructed in two and a half years with the aid of the Soviet Union.

The Soviets named it the "Friendship Bridge", but, since the fall of the communist regimes in both countries, the bridge got the more functional name of "Danube Bridge".

Border control stations are present on the bridge, due to its serving as a border crossing between the two countries. Since January 2007 there is no more customs control and the passport/identity card control is done "on one desk" either by the Bulgarian or the Romanian border police, being an "internal border" within the European Union.

Both Romania and Bulgaria became part of the Schengen area on 1 January, 2025, therefore border control is expected to cease operations on 30 June 2025.

On 3 September 2011 the Bulgarian part of the bridge was opened, after two months of rehabilitation.

There are a pair of rectangular towers supported by pillars on both ends.

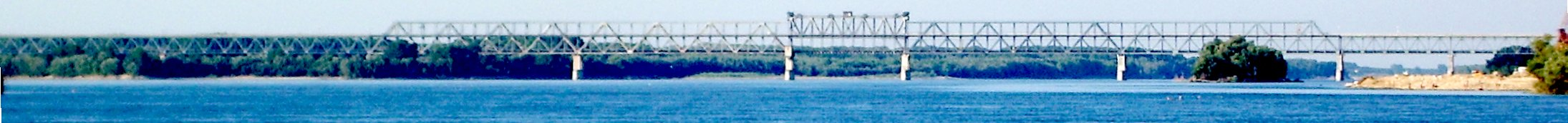
A panorama of the Danube Bridge as seen from Ruse

== Tolls ==
The following tolls apply for crossing the Danube Bridge:

Vehicle	Euro
Up to 8+1 seats; Up to 3.5 t	6 euro
Trucks up to 7.5 t; Vehicles between 9 and 23 seats	12 euro
Trucks up to 12 t	18 euro
Trucks over 12 t with up to 3 axles; Vehicles with over 23 seats	25 euro
Trucks over 12 t with 4 or more axles	37 euro

== Gallery ==
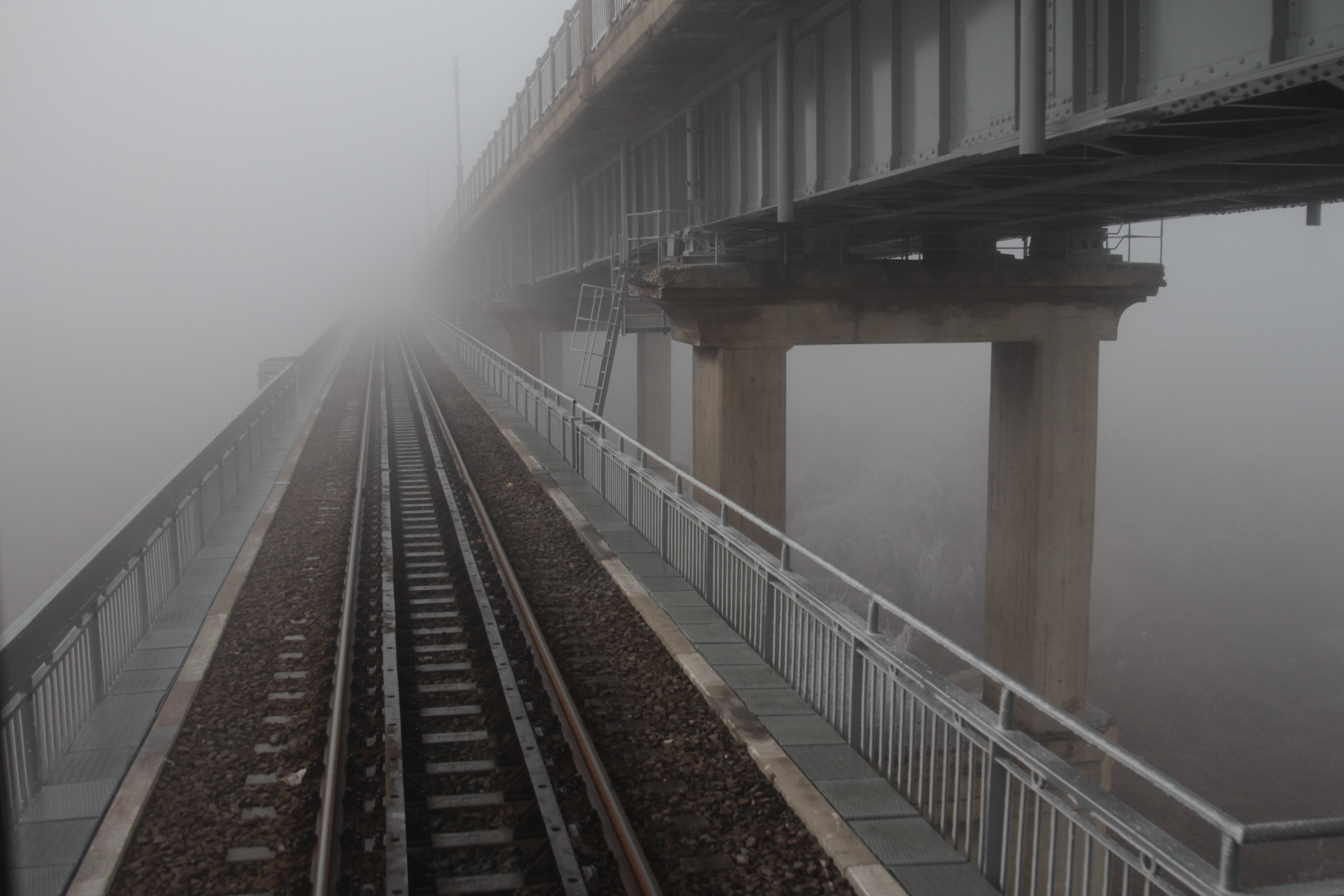
Romanian side of the bridge in winter

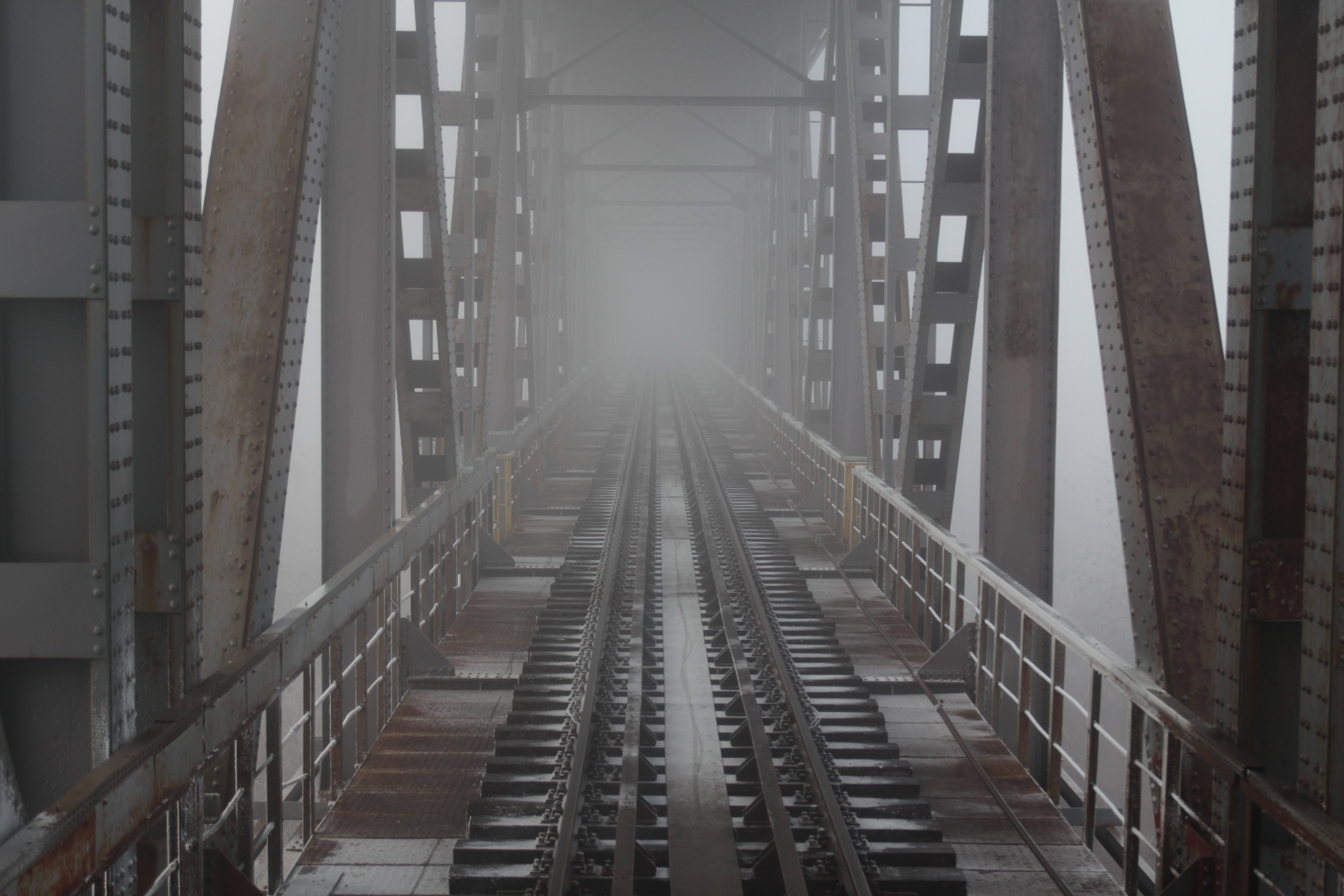
Middle of the bridge seen from the Bosphorus Express train (Bucharest–Istanbul) in winter

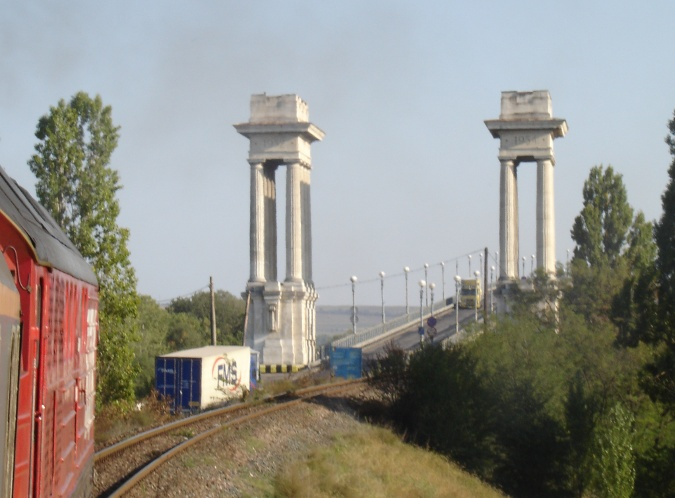
The colonnade portal

== See also ==
- European route E70
- European route E85
- DN5 road in Romania
- CFR Line 902 (Giurgiu – Bucharest) and CFR Line 903 (Giurgiu – Videle) in Romania
- Danube Bridge 2, another bridge connecting Bulgaria and Romania
- List of bridges in Bulgaria
- List of bridges in Romania
