= Transport in Bulgaria =

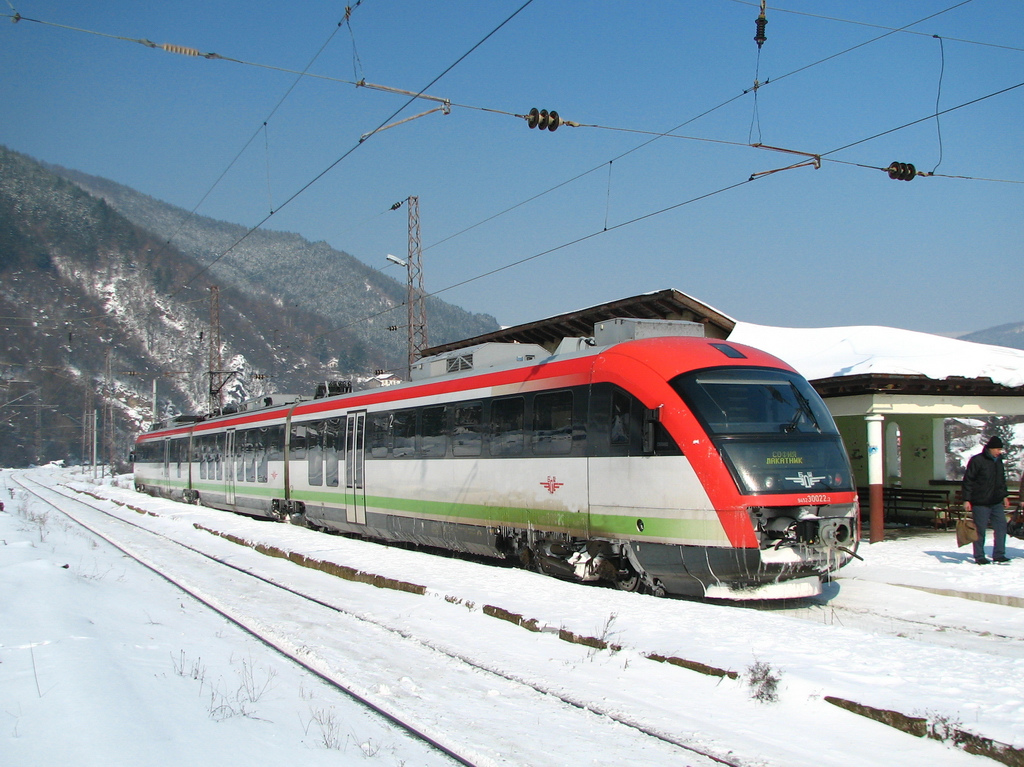
Siemens Desiro train on the Sofia–Lakatnik line

Transport in Bulgaria is dominated by road transport. As of 2024, the country had 879 kilometers of highways and another 117 km under construction. The total length of the network is almost 40,000 km, divided nearly in half between the national and the municipal road network. In addition, there are 57,000 km of streets. Buses play a significant role in long-distance public transport, coaches are operated by private companies. The capital Sofia has three major national bus terminals, the Central, the Western and the Southern Terminals.

The railway system is well-developed but the average speed is comparatively low; however, upgrading projects are underway. The Bulgarian State Railways (BDŽ) is the national railway company since 1879, but private freight operators are also present. The total length of the network reached 4,029 km, of which 995 km are doubled and 3001 km are electrified. With 74.4% of the railway network electrified, Bulgaria ranks fifth in Europe and among the first in the world. The Sofia Metro has four lines as of 2023.

Air traffic has been growing since the 2000s, which was facilitated by the modernisation of airports, as well as the implementation of new destinations and routes. The flag carrier is Bulgaria Air, but a number of private charter companies also exist, operating domestic and international flights. There are four international airports — Vasil Levski Sofia Airport, Burgas Airport, Varna Airport and Plovdiv Airport, while the total number of airports is 111.

Ports along the Danube and the Black Sea are the most important concerning Bulgaria's water transport system. The two largest ones are the Port of Varna and the Port of Burgas.

== Air transport ==
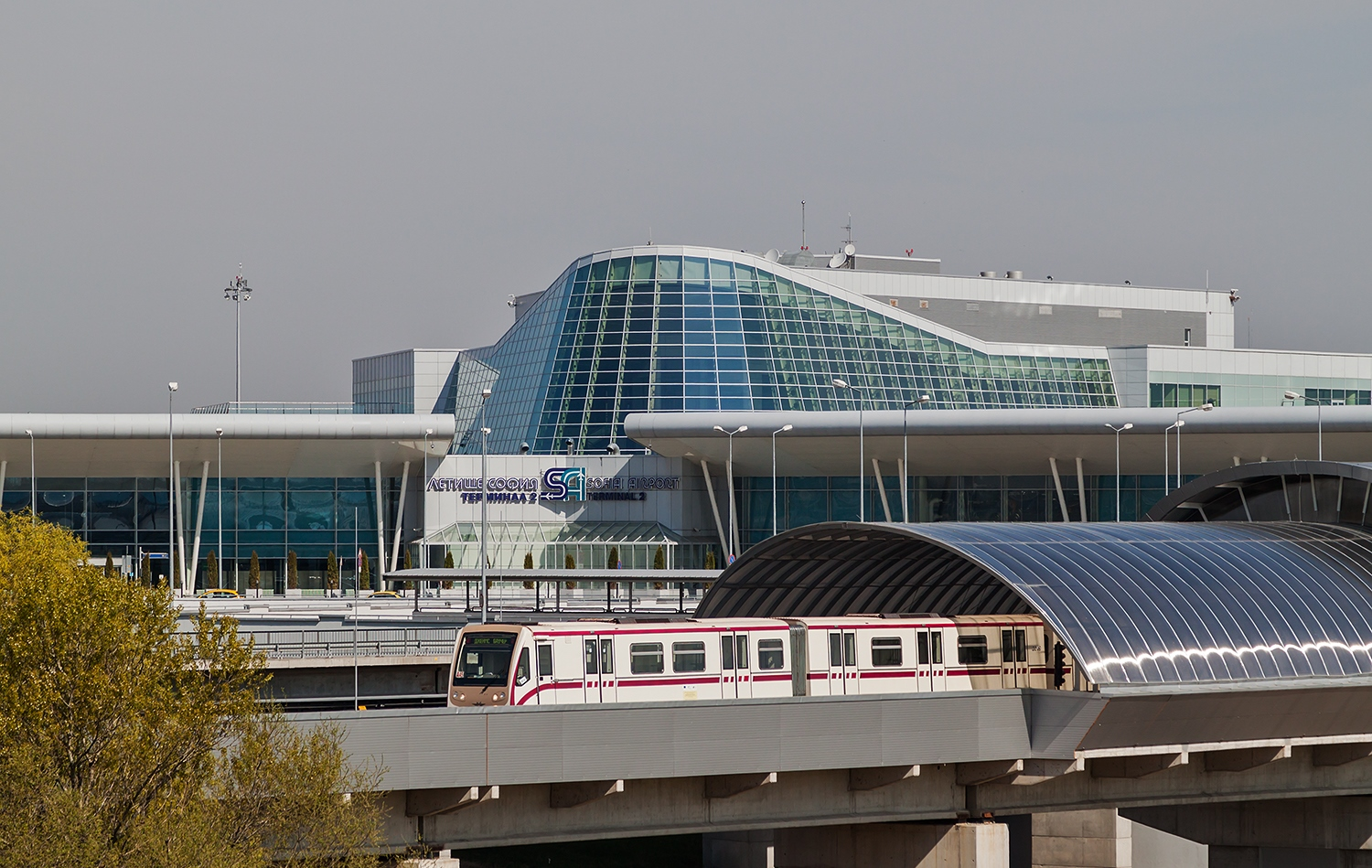
Vasil Levski Sofia Airport and a station of Sofia Metro

After the second terminal of International Airport Sofia was built the total number of passengers for the country rose and reached 6,595,790 in 2008, and in April 2011 Airport Sofia serviced 282 694 passengers, 13% more than the same period of 2009, when the record was 250,000 passengers. In 2011 passenger traffic at Bulgaria's three major airports – Sofia, Varna and Burgas – grew up to near 10% on the year to 3.89 million in the first half of 2011, due to rise of customers using international routes and launch of new destinations. In 2014, Bulgarian airports served 7,728,612 passengers and handled 23,101 tons of goods.

In the past aviation compared with road and railroad transport used to be a minor mode of freight movement, and only 860,000 passengers used Bulgarian airlines in 2001. In 2013 Bulgaria had 68 airports, 57 of which had paved runways. Two airports, Vasil Levski Sofia Airport and Burgas Airport, had a runway longer than 3,000 meters, and there were four heliports. The second- and third-largest airports, Varna Airport and Burgas Airport, serve mainly charter flights and have regular domestic links with the capital. In the early 2000s, Sofia Airport received substantial renovation, with aid from a Kuwaiti-led consortium, in anticipation of increased air connections with Europe. A three-phase expansion was scheduled for completion in 2010. The communist-era state airline, Balkan Airlines, was replaced by Bulgaria Air, which was privatised in 2006. In 2004 Bulgaria Air transported 365,465 passengers to international destinations, including all major European cities, while in 2014 this number was at 897,422.

== Railways ==
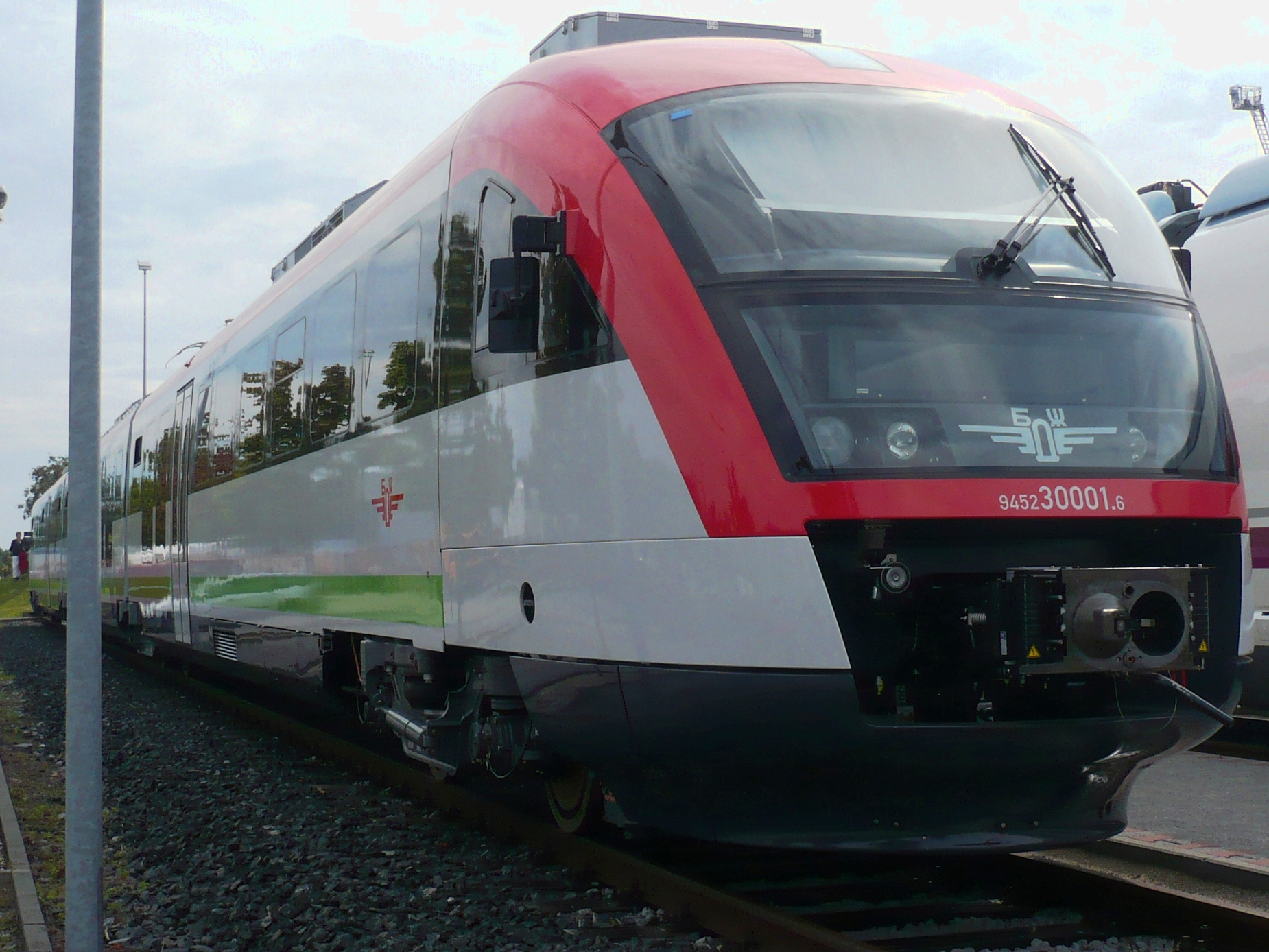
A BDZ Desiro train

Map of Bulgaria's railroad network (2026)

In 2005 Bulgaria had some 6,238 kilometers of open access track owned by the state company "National Company Railway Infrastructure", including a 125 kilometers long 760 mm narrow gauge railway – the Septemvri-Dobrinishte narrow gauge line and 4,316 km were considered main lines. Sofia, Plovdiv and Gorna Oryahovitsa are the hubs of the domestic system and of international rail connections.

Bulgaria's rail system has not expanded since the 1980s, in 2014 there were 4,023 kilometers of main lines. There are upgrading projects underway. After the completion of the Plovdiv – Dimitrovgrad high-speed line on July 1, 2012, the top operating speed was raised to 200 km/h and the national top speed record of 197 km/h set between Iskar and Elin Pelin with a leased Siemens Taurus electric locomotive is soon expected to be broken. There are also plans for upgrading for high speed operation and doubling (where needed) of the Plovdiv – Burgas railway. By the end of 2013, a total of 461 km of high-speed lines were expected to be built.

In the mid-2000s, railways remained a major mode of freight transportation, but with increasing problems with the maintenance of the infrastructure and lowering speeds, highways carried a progressively larger share of freight. The national passenger and freight operator is called Bulgarian State Railways, but there are also a number of private operators including Bulgarian Railway Company and DB Schenker Rail Bulgaria.

In 2014 the Bulgarian railways carried 14,225,000 tons of freight and 21.3 million passengers in 2019.

=== Sofia Metro ===
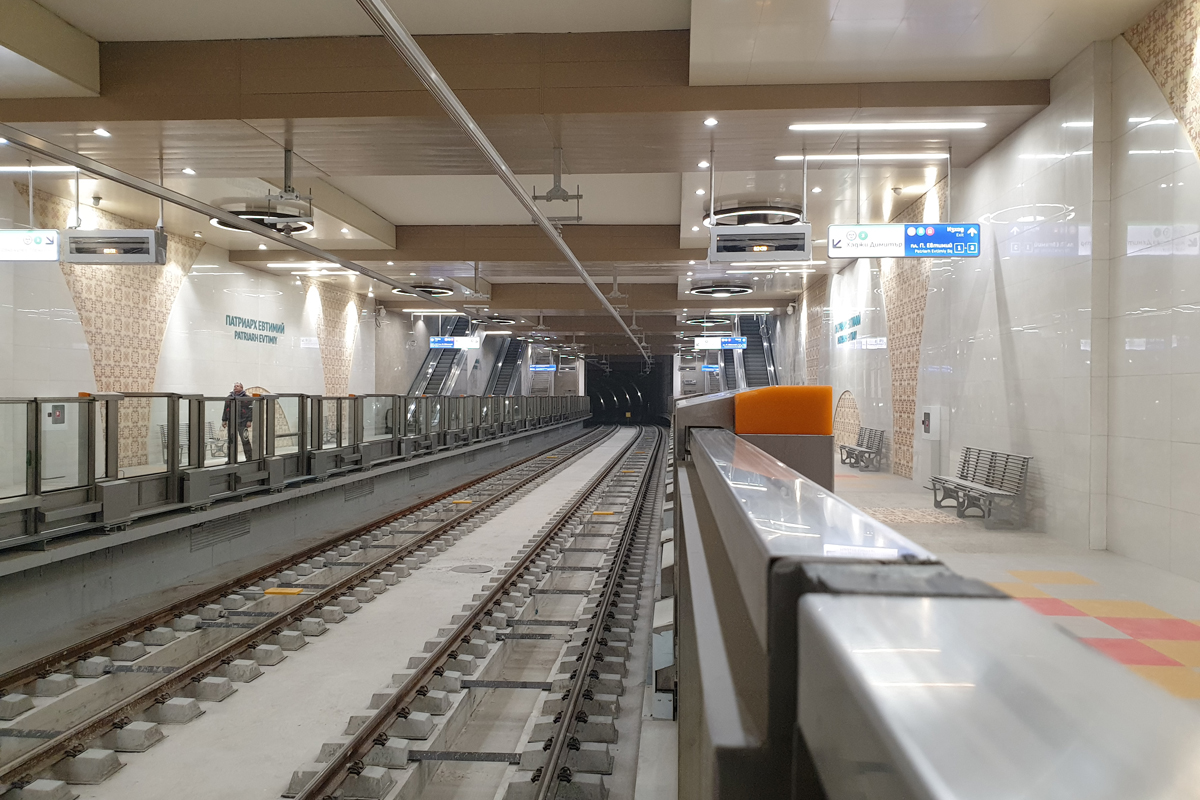
St. Patriarch Evtimiy Metro Station

In 1998 the first six kilometres of an often-interrupted 52 km standard gauge subway project (the Sofia Metro) opened in Sofia. Additional stations were later built, and in 2012 a second line opened. By April 2015 the total length was 36 km with 31 stations and Line 2 serving Sofia Airport. In 2016 the expansion of the network continued, as construction works on the third line commenced, and the system reached a total length of 40 km, with 35 stations along its two lines. In 2021, the metro was expanded to 52 km total length with 47 stations on 4 lines. Further expansions are expected in the period 2021–2027.

== Road transport ==
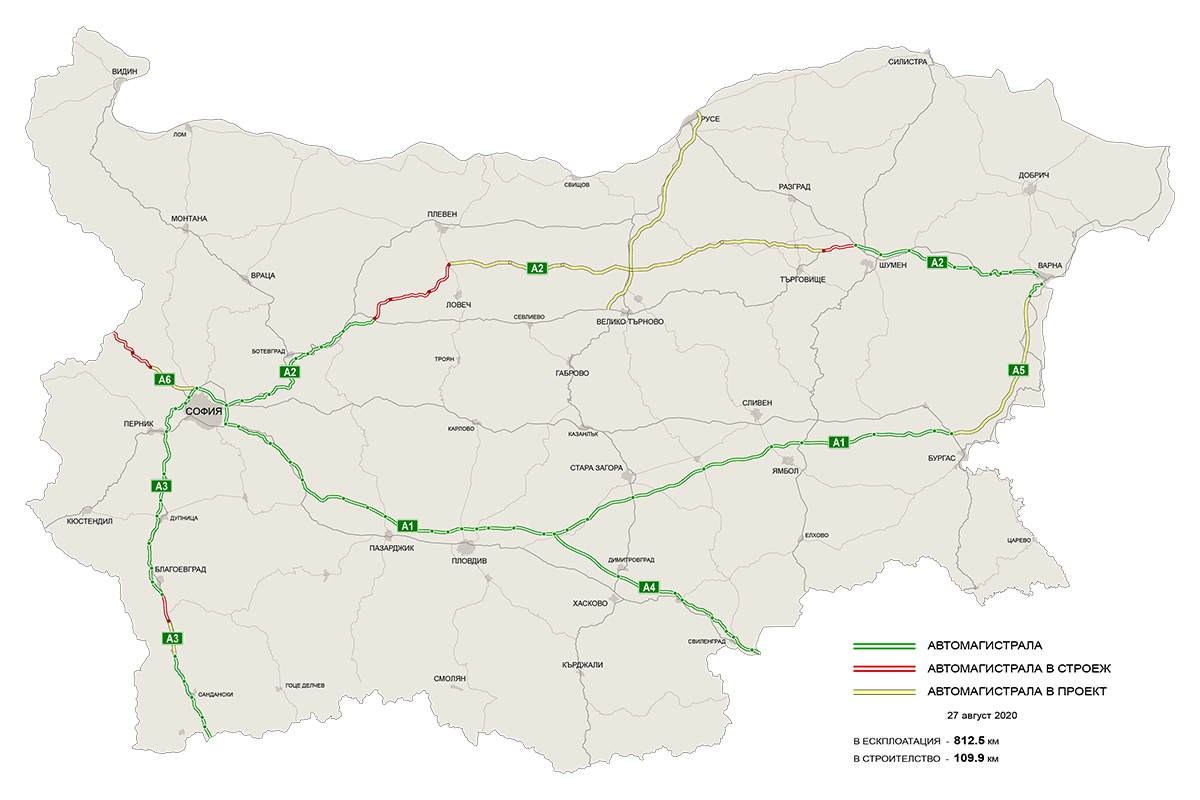
Bulgarian motorway network

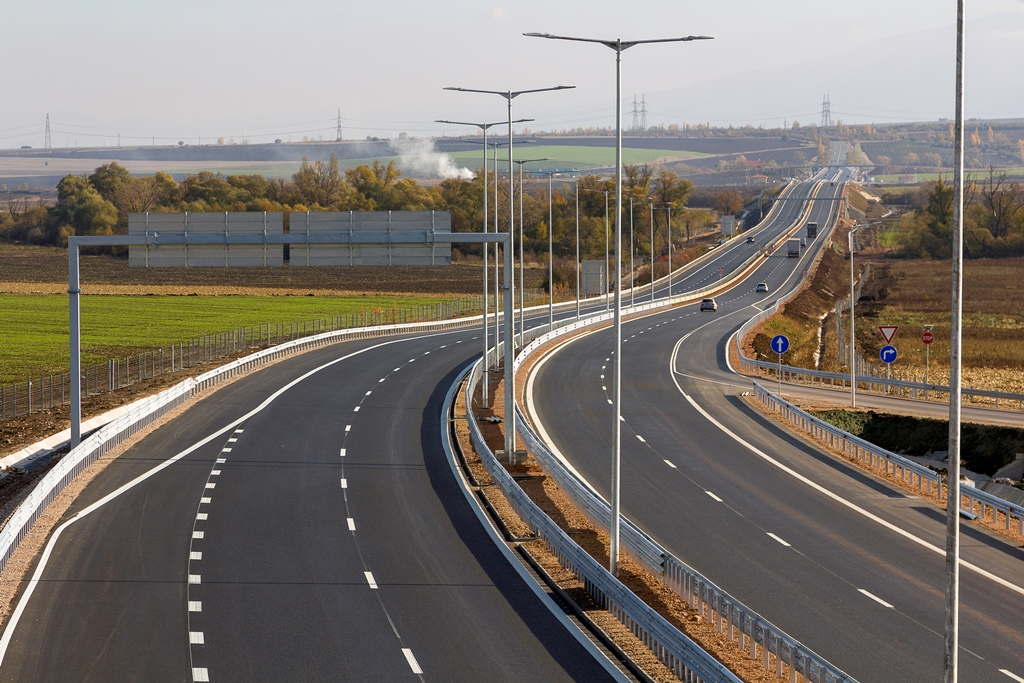
Europe motorway (A6) at Slivnitsa

Bulgaria has nearly 40,000 kilometers of roads, of which 19,968 km form the national road network and another 19,500 km are part of the municipal network. 879 kilometers of high-speed highways were in service in 2024. Over 98% of all national roads are paved. Roads have overtaken the railroads as the chief mode of freight transportation.

Long-term plans call for upgrading higher-quality roads and integrating the road system into the European grid. The focus is on improving road connectors with the neighbouring countries and domestic connections linking major cities, such as Sofia, Plovdiv, Burgas, Varna and Ruse. Bulgaria has delayed building some key highway connections since the 1990s, but European Union membership is a strong incentive for completion. A 114-kilometer link between eastern Bulgaria and the Turkish border is scheduled for completion in 2013. As of 2004, two international highways passed through Bulgaria, and a major highway ran from Sofia to the Black Sea coast. Proposed international corridors would pass from north to south, from Vidin to the border with Greece and from Ruse to the border with Greece, and west to east, from Serbia through Sofia to Burgas, Varna, and Edirne (Turkey). The Vidin-Calafat bridge was completed in 2013, relieving road and railroad traffic to Romania.

=== Motorways and expressways ===
Motorways construction timeline

- Trakia motorway – Sofia – Plovdiv – Stara Zagora – Yambol – Karnobat – Burgas (completed)
- Hemus motorway – Sofia – Yablanitsa – Shumen – Varna (Yablanitsa to Shumen remaining)
- Struma motorway – Sofia – Pernik – Blagoevgrad – Kulata (Greece) (renaming from Kresna to Cherniche)
- Maritsa motorway – Chirpan to Kapitan Andreevo (Turkey) (completed)
- Cherno More motorway – Varna to Burgas (planned)
- Europe motorway – Sofia – Kalotina (Serbia) (completed)
- Veliko Tarnovo–Ruse motorway Veliko Tarnovo – Rousse (Romania) (planned)

=== Major roads ===
- I-1 road
- I-2 road
- I-3 road
- I-4 road
- I-5 road
- I-6 road
- I-7 road
- I-8 road
- I-9 road
- Sofia Ring Road

=== Long-distance public transport ===
The Central Bus Station in Sofia

Buses are frequently used in Bulgaria for long-distance travel. Long-distance coaches depart from Sofia from the Central, West and South Bus Stations, international routes are served by the Serdika Station. Besides public buses, coaches are also operated by private companies, like Union-Ivkoni, Biomet or Etap-Grup. Tickets can be purchased at the offices of these companies, at stations and from the bus driver. Some companies offer online booking. There are numerous international destinations to a number of European countries, as well as Turkey. Share taxis called marshrutka operate in Sofia, and in the countryside between smaller settlements.

== Waterways ==
- 470 km (2006) along the 2,300 km long Pan-European corridor VII along the Danube River. Other smaller rivers, as Kamchiya and Ropotamo, are navigable only for recreational uses.

== Pipelines ==
In 2005, Bulgaria had 2,425 kilometers of natural gas pipelines, 339 kilometers of oil pipelines, and 156 kilometers of pipelines for refined products. The pipeline system was scheduled for substantial changes and additions, however. The 279-kilometer Burgas-Alexandroupolis Pipeline, still under negotiation among Bulgaria, Greece, and Russia in 2006, would provide a bypass of the overloaded Bosporus Strait. The line would enable Russian oil arriving at the Bulgarian oil port of Burgas to reach Greece's Mediterranean port at Alexandroupolis. A 900-kilometer U.S.- financed alternate route, known as the AMBO pipeline, would bring oil from Burgas across Bulgaria and North Macedonia to the Albanian port of Vlore on the Adriatic Sea, bypassing both the Bosporus and Greece. As of October 2006, approval of both pipelines was expected. With international investment, Bulgaria began constructing a new domestic gas transportation network beginning in 2005. The Russian Gazprom company planned a gas pipeline from Dimitrovgrad in eastern Bulgaria across Serbia, reaching the Adriatic Sea in Croatia. Some 400 kilometers of the planned Nabucco Pipeline, bringing gas from Azerbaijan and Iran to Central Europe, were to cross Bulgaria sometime before 2011.

== Ports and harbours ==
=== River ports ===
Lom, Nikopol, Oryahovo, Ruse, Silistra, Svishtov, Tutrakan, Vidin are river ports on the Danube river.

=== Sea ports ===
Sea ports

Ahtopol, Balchik, Burgas, Nesebar, Pomorie, Sozopol, Tsarevo, Varna

Container terminals

The major and largest ports with international significance are Varna and Burgas.

Yacht ports

Balchik, Burgas, Byala, Golden Sands, Nesebar, Sozopol, Sveti Vlas, Varna

== Merchant marine ==
- total: 31 ships

ships by type:

- bulk carrier: 31 ships grouped by volume of 24,000 – 13,000 DWT, 35,000 – 25,000 DWT and 43,000 – 36,000 DWT

== Urban transport ==
While most urban and suburban transport in Bulgaria is composed of buses (using an increasing number of CNG vehicles), around a dozen cities also have trolleybus networks. The capital Sofia also has a tram and an metro network.

== See also ==
- Executive Agency for Exploration and Maintenance of the Danube River
- International E-road network
- List of bridges in Bulgaria
- List of highest paved roads in Europe
- List of highest paved roads in Europe by country
- List of metro systems
- List of the busiest airports in Europe
- List of tram and light rail transit systems
- Pan-European corridors
- Sofia Public Transport
- Trans-European Transport Network
