= New Europe Bridge =

Road and rail bridge over the Danube

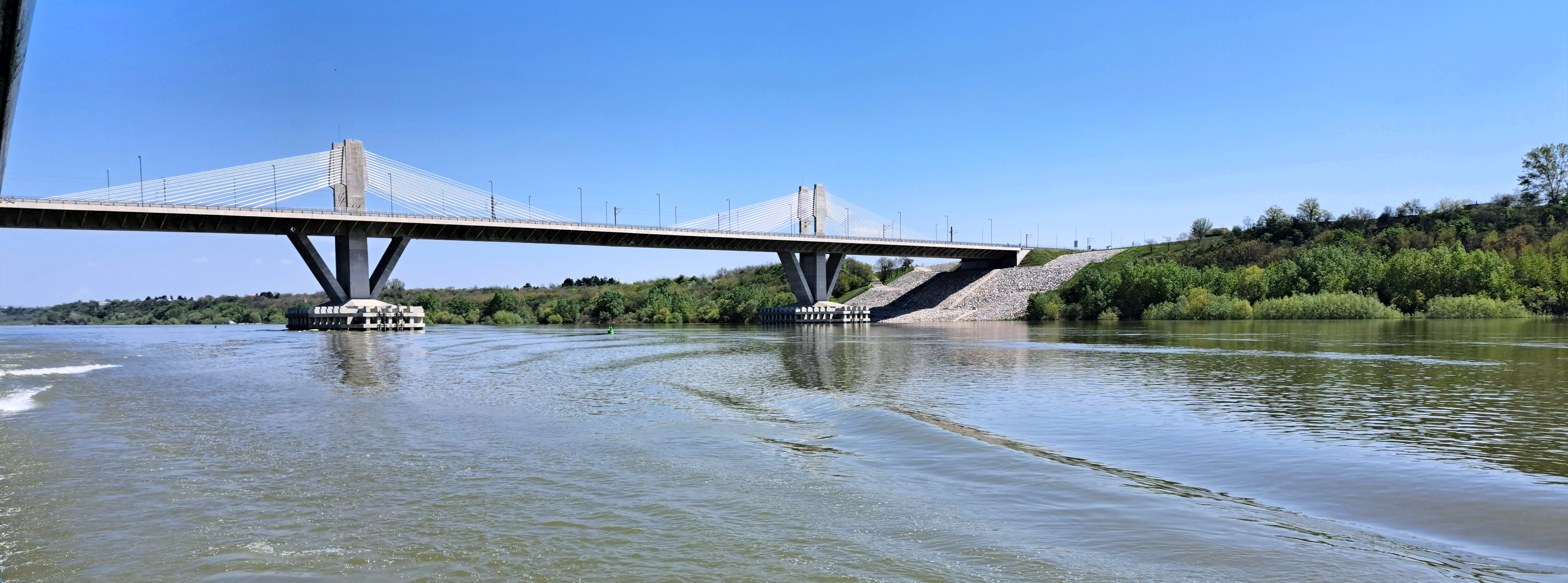
- Coordinates: 44°00′08″N 22°56′54″E
- Carries: Four lanes of roadway, one railway track and a combined bicycle path/pedestrian walkway (the designed second walkway was not completed: it runs only from the Bulgarian river bank to the island under the bridge)
- Crosses: Danube
- Locale: Between Calafat, Romania and Vidin, Bulgaria, at river kilometer 796
- Official name: New Europe Bridge (Note: Since 15 June 2013.)
- Website: vidincalafatbridge.bg/en

Characteristics
- Design: Extradosed bridge
- Total length: 1,971 m (6,467 ft)
- Width: 31.35 m (102.9 ft)
- Longest span: 180 m (590 ft)

History
- Designer: Fernández Casado
- Constructed by: FCC Construccion
- Opened: 14 June 2013; 13 years ago

Statistics
- Daily traffic: 2,590 vehicles/day
- Toll: 0–37 euro

Location
- Interactive map of New Europe Bridge

The New Europe Bridge, also known as Danube Bridge 2 (Bulgarian: Мост Нова Европа/Дунав мост 2, romanized: Most Nova Evropa/Dunav most 2; Romanian: Podul Noua Europă) is a road and rail bridge between the cities of Vidin, Bulgaria, and Calafat, Romania. It is the second bridge on the shared section of the Danube between the two countries. It is an extradosed bridge and was built by the Spanish company Fomento de Construcciones y Contratas, at the cost of €226 million. It was officially opened with a ceremony held on 14 June 2013. The first vehicles were allowed to cross the bridge after midnight, on 15 June 2013.

It was previously known as Danube Bridge 2 (Bulgarian: Дунав мост 2, romanized: Dunav most 2; Romanian: Podul 2 peste Dunăre) and informally called the Vidin–Calafat Bridge or Calafat–Vidin Bridge (Bulgarian: Мост Видин–Калафат, romanized: Most Vidin–Kalafat; Romanian: Podul Calafat–Vidin). The latter is the most common name it receives in Romania.

== History and geography ==
As early as in 1909 the local authorities in Vidin (in Bulgaria) had first expressed their interest in building a bridge to Calafat (in Romania), by sending a petition to the Bulgarian parliament and to Aleksandar Malinov, who was prime minister at that time. These historical documents were shown on Bulgarian television in June 2013, during a report on the Second Danube Bridge. Bulgarian newspapers hence described the opening of the New Europe Bridge across the Danube river as 'the materialising of a century old dream'.

Building a bridge between Calafat (in Romania) and Vidin (in Bulgaria) had been discussed more seriously since the late 1970s, but the plan was abandoned over and over again. For centuries there had been no bridges crossing the Danube river between Bulgaria and Romania since the destruction of Constantine's Bridge, which was built by the Romans, until the Giurgiu–Ruse Friendship Bridge was built and opened in 1954. During the late 1990s, Bulgaria had to close its border with Yugoslavia, because of the war in Kosovo, followed by an international economic boycott against Yugoslavia. This caused great damage to the already weak economy in northwestern Bulgaria. In fact, the whole country became isolated, since Bulgarians had always been relying on the road through Serbia for their transit transport to Western Europe.

A ferry shuttle service between Vidin and Calafat used to run night and day, but the ferry boat would not start to cross the river before it was fully loaded with trucks. During the night, with little trucks arriving, ferry passengers had to wait several hours to cross the Danube river. Dry summers come with low water levels in the Danube river, which sometimes caused the ferry to get stuck at the loading ramp, making waiting times even longer. Another factor that would make ferry traffic impossible or difficult were the very cold winters, when the Danube river sometimes freezes completely. About one month after the opening of the bridge, the ferry service between Vidin and Calafat was suspended.

Travellers from Bulgaria (and Turkey) towards Central and Western Europe who wanted to avoid both the long waiting times and high transfer prices for the Calafat-Vidin ferry crossing and the customs procedures and road tolls one would face when travelling through Serbia, which is outside the European Union border, had to make a long detour towards the Giurgiu–Ruse Bridge. This bridge is located 307 kilometres (191 mi) downstream and before 2013 it was the only other bridge across the Danube border that Bulgaria shares with Romania. This detour to Ruse often took longer than waiting for a ferry in Vidin or Oryahovo, however, both ways of crossing the border can take a long time. Travelling through Serbia was usually faster, but crossing outside the borders of the European Union can be a hassle with customs. Waiting at the Serbian customs can take 1 to 5 hours, especially during the summer season, when many immigrants (people of Turkish descent, living in Germany and Austria) travel back to their families.

The Danube Bridge 2 makes travelling in and out of Bulgaria through Vidin much easier than it was previously by ferry boat. Even though the linking roads are still far from motorway standards, the New Europe Bridge (Danube Bridge 2) has become highly popular among transport companies, because it provides a road with no custom checks from Bulgaria, Greece and Turkey to Austria, Germany and the rest of Europe, through Romania and Hungary, without leaving the European Union.

The Giurgiu–Ruse Bridge was built with help from the Soviet Union and opened in 1954 as the Friendship Bridge (Bulgarian: Мост на дружбата, romanized: Most na druzhbata; Romanian: Podul Prieteniei). Instead of its official name, Bulgarians tend to simply call it the Dunav most, which means Danube Bridge. Hence the name Dunav most 2 for the second bridge crossing the Danube between Vidin and Calafat. On the other hand, in Romania, this trend is not as common. Kilometer markers are set up along the Danube river and counting starts at the Black Sea.

Although Bulgaria is south of Romania, crossing the Danube Bridge 2 from Vidin towards Calafat is done from northwest to southeast. This is because here the Danube has a very large mirrored S-shape, spanning across approximately 90 kilometres (56 mi), starting at Novo Selo and ending in Lom. The bridge is located near the middle of this reversed S.

At most part of the Danube river, the Bulgarian bank lies slightly higher above water than the Romanian river bank. However, the city of Vidin is lying lower and is protected by dikes, while the bank on the Calafat side is high above Danube river.

=== Controversy about the location ===
Starting from 1993, there was a long and bitter dispute between Romania and Bulgaria about the location of the second Danube bridge. Bulgaria wanted to revive the isolated city of Vidin, as well as to have the bridge on the shortest possible route to Central and Western Europe and argued for putting the bridge as far west as possible, between Vidin and Calafat. A research under the European PHARE programme found that the most profitable place for the bridge would have been between Lom and Rast, but neither country agreed with this. Romania wanted transiting trucks to stay in their country as long as possible by placing the bridge further east, between Turnu Măgurele and Nikopol.

In 1998, Greece offered to invest in the bridge, since they wanted a road linking Thessaloniki to the rest of Europe through Romania, as Greece was also cut off from Europe by the war in Kosovo and the boycott against Yugoslavia. The final agreement was that the second Danube bridge was to be built between Vidin and Calafat, but Romania refused to invest in other than the adjacent infrastructure on their territory.

=== Financing sources ===
In 1999, a stability pact for South East Europe was signed by banks and national governments, aiming to bring investments to countries like Bulgaria and Romania. Chairman of this stability pact was Bodo Hombach, who had set up a great lobby in favor of the new bridge between Vidin and Calafat. The cost of building the bridge, without the adjoining infrastructures was estimated in 2000 to be €99 million. Bulgarian Prime Minister Ivan Kostov wanted to give the project a credit loan of US$180 million. Thanks to the lobby of Bodo Hombach, the European Investment Bank granted the project a credit loan of €50 million in December 2000. In January 2001, the cost for the bridge construction and the adjacent roads toward the bridge was estimated at US$200 million.

In 2004, a research on the design of the bridge was financed by the PHARE program. In 2005 and 2006, consultants were hired to control all procedures in the building process and private companies were invited to send in a bid.

In 2012, the cost of building the Danube Bridge 2 and its adjoining infrastructures raised to the sum of €226 million.

== Construction progress ==
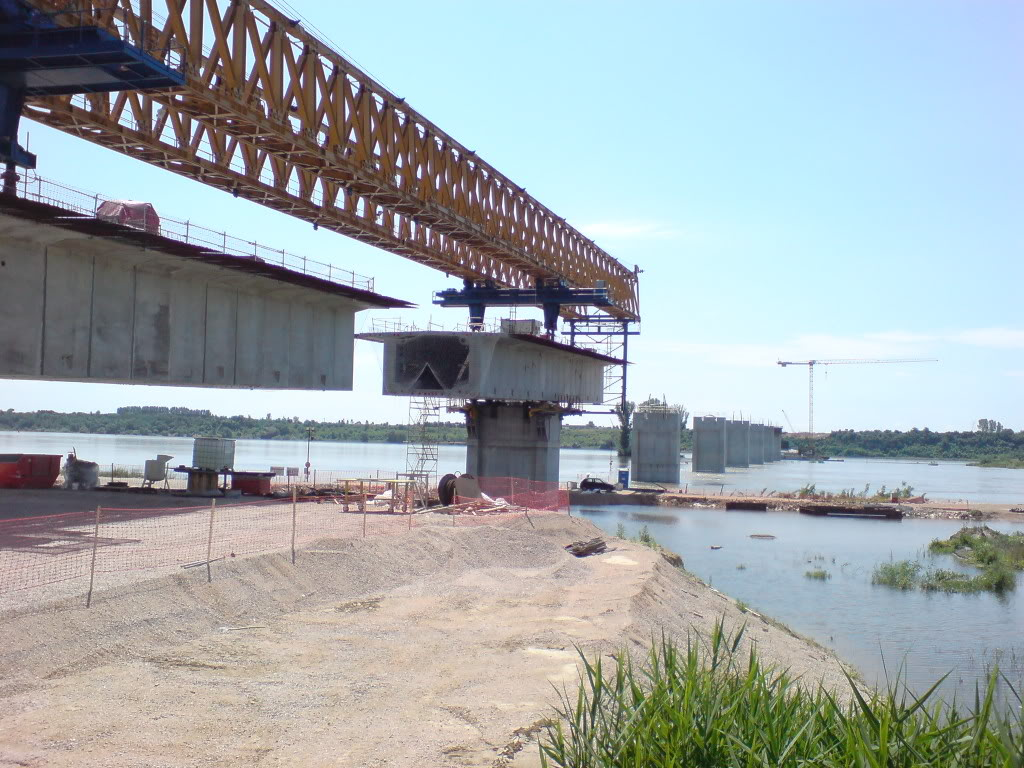
Construction of the Vidin–Calafat Bridge as seen in 2010 on the Bulgarian river bank. View towards the small island in the Bulgarian non-navigable part of the Danube river. The ferry boat terminal is about 4 km (2.5 mi) down the river from the bridge.

External images
- Panoramic view of the bridge under construction (14 October 2012)
- (A location map of the images is placed down below on the same page)

Construction officially began on 13 May 2007 in Vidin in the presence of Bulgarian Prime Minister Sergei Stanishev and Special Coordinator of the Stability Pact for South Eastern Europe Erhard Busek. According to former Romanian Minister of Transport, Constructions and Tourism Radu Berceanu, construction was planned to be completed in 2010, with most of the construction to be done by Bulgarian subcontractors.

=== Delay before and during construction ===
The Bulgarian Ministry of Transport delayed the start of the construction at least three times before the inaugural ceremony. Soon after the official ceremony, trouble started. Vidin municipality had split up land that was needed for the bridge into smaller parcels. Since these parcels were sold out to different people, the Bulgarian minister of transport had to wait for a law that made it possible to expropriate the new landowners. These procedures slowed down the real start of the building process to a great extent.

Between 2007 and 2009 not much progress had been achieved. Taking a closer look on the Bulgarian side, one could notice some preparation of the track leading towards the future bridge, with a small office being built. Meanwhile, the Danube riverbank was being prepared for the construction of a concrete factory. Trees on the small island on the Bulgarian side of the Danube however took a long time to be cut off.

In 2009, it became clear that the building of the second Danube Bridge could not be finished by the end of 2010, since it had not yet really begun. Due to the failure to meet the original deadline, Bulgaria almost lost the financing of the whole project, but they were granted more time to finish the bridge by the end of 2012.

=== Construction becoming visible ===
Visible construction actually started in 2009, on the Bulgarian bank of the Danube river. During the first year of rapidly building the concrete factory, FCC Construccion was preparing the segments for the bridge. The idea was to have these segments ready long before they were needed, so that the assembly of the superstructure of the bridge could not be delayed because of possible quality problems with the concrete.

The Danube Bridge 2 consists of eight pillars that are in the non-navigable channel of Danube river, crossing from the low lying Bulgarian bank over the small island, followed by its four main pillars, numbered PB9, PB10, PB11 and PB12. The design was to have 13 pairs of stay cables attached to every main pillar in the navigable channel of the Danube river.

By June 2010, only the bridge crossing over the small island had been built. The foundation of the pillars in the navigable channel of the river were built during the same year by special foundation contractor TERRATEST. Foundation per pier was composed by 24 in situ piles 2 m diameter and depths ranging between 68 and 80 m (one of the deepest in situ foundation project in Europe), executed by maritime means. The main pillars became clearly visible throughout 2011.

In February 2012, the Bulgarian Minister of European Union Funds Management Tomislav Donchev said that he expected the bridge to be finished by the end of 2012. Throughout the year 2012 the bridge got into shape. Starting at PB9, the bridge deck was extended segment by segment and soon the first stay cables could be seen.

By April 2012, only one segment in between the bridge decks of PB 9 and PB10 was still missing. After this gap was closed, one could walk halfway across the Danube river. The gap between the bridge decks of pillars PB10 and PB11 was closed during the summer. Despite the low water levels in the Danube river construction continued swiftly, working on the abutment A3, on the Romanian river bank.

On 1 October 2012, the gap between the bridge deck at PB12 and the abutment A3 on the Romanian river bank was closed. On 3 October 2012, the remaining gap in the bridge was only 18 metres (59 ft). Bulgarian radio reporters found out about a technical problem: the difference in the height of the bridge deck between two sides of the gap was 45 centimetres (18 in), so closing of the gap was not possible before both bridge decks were adjusted to the same height level.

=== Bridge deck ready, but finishing works still lasted 8 months ===
If the building process continued at the same speed, reportedly, one may have expected that the last gap, between pillars PB11 and PB12, was closed in November 2012. It remained however uncertain when vehicles were to be able to cross the bridge, as the finishing works, such as paving the bridge deck and mounting safety barriers, were expected to take several months.

On 24 October 2012, the two countries' Prime Ministers, joined by the European Union Regional Policy Commissioner Johannes Hahn, met halfway on the bridge, after the two shores of the Danube were finally connected during the preceding week. At the event, the Bulgarian Prime Minister Boyko Borisov declared that he expected that the bridge would be opened in spring 2013.

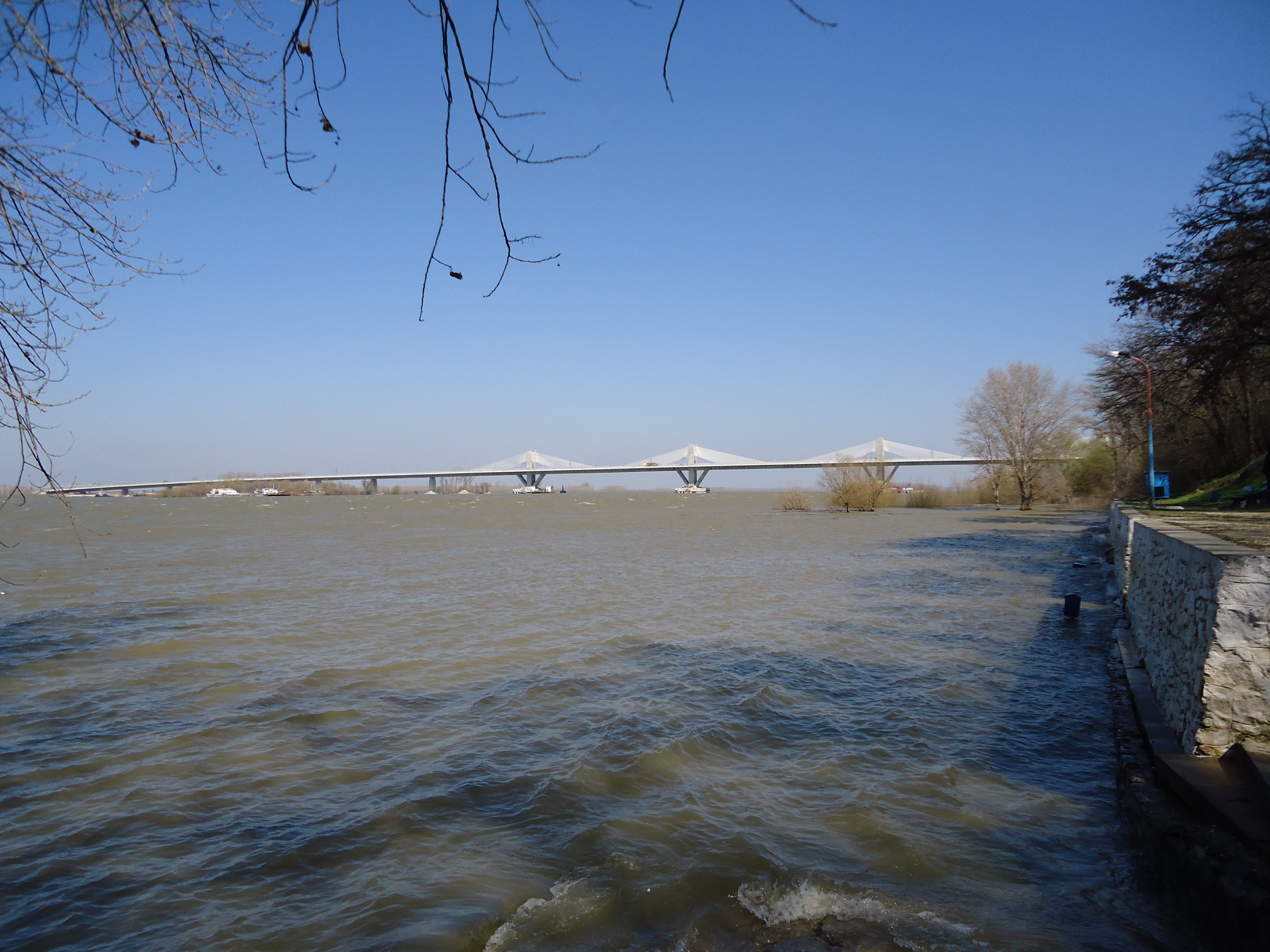
Calafat - Vidin bridge, as seen in March 2013, from the Romanian bank of the Danube

Another issue that had to be solved was the establishment of a management company that has to operate the bridge and collect tolls. Pending issues were how and where that company would be registered, dispute resolution methods and what fiscal law it would be subject to. In October 2012 it was expected that this company would be located in Sofia.

The building of the bridge saw a fatal victim in November 2012, when a Romanian worker fell off the bridge. His body was not found.

In May 2013, the FCC subcontractor Eptisa tested the bridge with heavily loaded train cars and trucks. The total weight used for the tests was 1,992 tonnes.

The longest line of waiting trucks on the bridge could add up to 100 trucks, with a total maximum weight of 4,000 tonnes, assuming that every truck would be loaded to a maximum of 40 tonnes.

=== Opening date ===
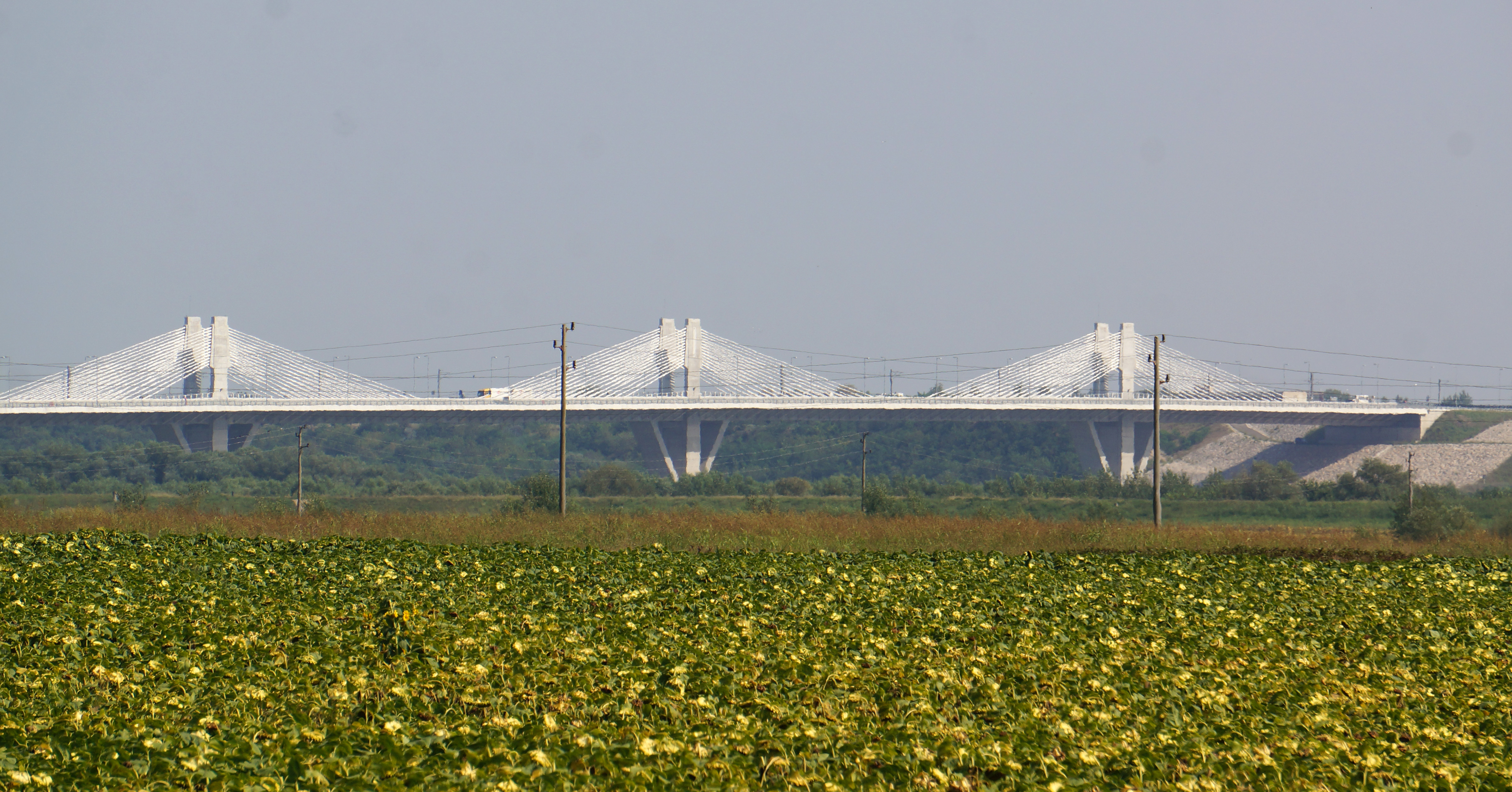
New Europe Bridge

On 22 May 2013, the Bulgarian president announced that the opening ceremony of the Danube Bridge 2 was set to take place on 14 June 2013, and that the toll for passenger cars would be six euro.

The issue of the establishment of a management company that would operate the bridge and collect tolls was solved. The company that manages the bridge is based in Vidin, the road tolls are collected at the Romanian side of the bridge and each side receives the part of the tolls that they have invested in the bridge (about 80% of the toll funds will go to Bulgaria).

The opening of the bridge was estimated to take place in May 2013, but technical problems have caused further delay. Some of these technical details consisted of setting up cabins for the border police that checks the traffic between Bulgaria and Romania. The two countries were initially set to become part of the Schengen Area by the time the bridge would open, and no border police cabins had been ordered until the very last moment. After some delay, the bridge was officially opened on 14 June 2013.

=== Work left to be done ===
In its first year of operation, it was discovered that water was leaking in between the asphalt road cover and the bridge deck. Repairs took 4 months and were paid by the FCC company, through the warranty established.

The bridge has a separated path for pedestrians and cyclists, but the approach to this cycling track seems to be not signposted clearly enough. Cyclists approaching the bridge from Vidin, Bulgaria would have to cross the approach road 1/E79 at some point, to get to the cycling track on the left side of the road, but crash barriers stand in their way. Cyclists therefore often continue cycling on the main road instead, as can be seen in this video.

Only 16 months after its official opening there are potholes in the road from the bridge to the toll gates, as can be seen further on in the aforementioned video

Approaching the bridge from Vidin, Bulgaria, in the summer of 2013 it was not very clearly signposted that traffic past the Vidin exit, which lies approximately 5 kilometres from the bridge, would automatically end up at the Calafat toll gates, with no possibility to escape the toll fares. This has been fixed by a sign warning that the road ahead is a toll road, just a few hundred metres before the bridge. At the point where the railway meets the road, a gap in the median crash barrier has been adapted to serve as a U-turn lane. The main road (1/E79) was supposed to have 2 lanes in each direction, but the left lane now ends into the U-turn-facility, which is signposted rather sparsely, thus forming a safety risk to both traffic overtaking at higher speeds and cyclists, as can be seen in this video, filmed in October 2014.

Last, the Calafat-Vidin bridge does not yet have any motorway connections (see below).

== Connecting road network ==
Pan-European corridor IV highlighted in red

The Danube Bridge 2 is part of the Pan-European Corridor IV. It is also part of the European route E79, that runs from Miskolc (Hungary) to Thessaloniki (Greece), via the Romanian cities of Beiuş, Deva, Petroşani, Târgu Jiu and Craiova.

According to the planned road network of Pan-European corridors, the bridge was supposed to have access to the Bucharest – Craiova – Timișoara – Budapest motorway by 2017, allowing rapid transit from North-western Bulgaria, to South-western Romania, Eastern Hungary and the rest of Europe.

=== Bulgarian perspective ===
The national road from Sofia to Vidin (I-1/E79) is linked to the Hemus motorway (A2) up to the city of Botevgrad, and continues with a dual carriageway road to Vratsa. The road from Montana to Vidin is a rehabilitated two-lane single carriageway road.

There is also another road from Sofia to Vidin (81), via Kostinbrod and through the Petrohan Pass to Montana. This road is shorter and very scenic, but it takes more time as it runs over the Balkan Mountains and through the villages.

There are plans for upgrading the road from Botevgrad to Vidin to an expressway (dual carriageway road without hard shoulder), with a tender for the construction of several sections announced at the end of 2012. Traffic analysis on this route have indicated that (as of 2013) it did not require a motorway status, therefore Bulgaria's priorities remain finishing the already started motorway projects, such as the Hemus and the Struma motorways, as well as the new planned Europe motorway, between Sofia and the Serbian border.

=== Romanian perspective ===
In Romania, the bridge provides access to national roads connecting with Craiova and Drobeta-Turnu Severin. These are not among the busiest roads in the country, according to a study conducted in 2010.

The DN56 road from Calafat to Craiova, which was considered to be in a poor condition has seen significant rehabilitation works, which has since been completed. The DN56A road from Calafat to Drobeta-Turnu Severin has recently been rehabilitated. Further from Drobeta-Turnu Severin, the DN6 road to Lugoj, has also recently been under rehabilitation works and bypasses all the major settlements on the route. From Lugoj, the first 11.5 km long section of the A6 motorway provides a link to the currently partially under construction A1 motorway and thereby further to Nădlac and the Hungarian border.

The remainder of the A6 motorway, currently in the pre-feasibility phase, would include a connection to the bridge in one of its considered routes, and a new planned European transit route named Via Carpathia, connecting Lithuania to Greece, was recently discussed in the European Parliament and includes the Calafat–Vidin Bridge on its route. The Romanian PM Victor Ponta made a statement after the inauguration of the bridge that Romania plans to build a motorway between Craiova and Calafat.

Most of the international transit traffic across the bridge is between Bulgaria and Hungary, with a significant part of the freight traffic coming from Turkey. The route from Kapitan Andreevo (the border between Bulgaria and Turkey) to Nădlac (the border between Romania and Hungary) across the Calafat–Vidin Bridge is approximately 20 kilometres (12 mi) shorter than the route across the Giurgiu–Ruse Bridge, which had been the most used route between the two countries for the freight traffic. It is also an important alternative, in terms of time, to the transit route through Serbia, which despite being shorter and providing more kilometers of motorway, has pricier road tolls and can take more time for customs procedures, due to the fact that Serbia is not a member of the European Union.

=== Number of vehicles per day ===
At an inspection tour before the opening of the bridge, Bulgarian Minister of Transport Ivaylo Moskovski said that he expected traffic across the bridge to exceed 100,000 vehicles in the first year, although initially estimates suggested a volume of 3,000 vehicles per day, which is closer to that of the Giurgiu–Ruse Bridge.

When Moskovski said that he expected 100,000 vehicles to cross the bridge each year, he should have known that this number was not accurate, as this boils down to 274 vehicles per day, well below the number of vehicles per day needed to make this bridge economically feasible. None of the journalists seemed to be aware of this fact. From the very first days after opening, the annual average daily traffic on the bridge was at least around 1200 vehicles per day and this number gradually went up.

A total of 508,294 vehicles crossed the bridge in the first year after the opening, thus surpassing the initial prognosis, set between 450,000 and 500,000 vehicles per year.

=== Access for cyclists ===
When approaching the New Europe Bridge from the Bulgarian side, many cyclists who are not familiar with the local situation, will assume that they should approach the bridge from the ring road around Vidin. This puts them in fast moving traffic on road 1/E79, with many heavy freight vehicles. Since the cycling lane is on the left, behind guardrails, when arriving to the bridge from the Bulgarian side, a detour has to be made to get to the bridge by bicycle. Any cyclist using the car lanes on E79 to get from Bulgaria to Romania has ignored a sign at the Novo Selo junction (link between road 122 and road 1/E79) that forbids bicycles and horse-drawn carts from there to the bridge. The correct way to cycle from Vidin to Calafat would be to leave town on Bulevard Panonia (бул. Панония), then to turn right, into the industrial area where the ferry port used to be, to follow the blue signs "Дунав мост/Danube bridge" and to cross the remains of the former railway line to the ferry port. After a left turn, you follow a road parallel to a dyke along Danube river. Right after cycling underneath the bridge, cyclists need to turn left, follow this road for about 600 meters, cycling past the bridge administration building and then turn left again, onto the bridge's combined cycling track and pedestrian walkway, while ignoring a sign that makes driving straight on compulsory. After crossing the bridge, on the Romanian side, the cycling path follows the road in a long bend to the left. At the (former) border control post, the narrow cycling path runs between the lanes for cars and trucks, against the direction of traffic, with a few busy intersections. Cyclists keep turning left, onto DN56. At some point cyclists need to cross 4 lanes of traffic, to continue onto Strada Traian into Calafat town.

== Tolls ==
Effective from 1 July 2013, the following tolls apply for crossing the New Europe Bridge:

Vehicle	Euro	Leva	Lei
Up to 8+1 seats; Up to 3.5 t	6 euro	12 leva	27 lei
Trucks up to 7.5 t; Vehicles between 9 and 23 seats	12 euro	23 leva	54 lei
Trucks up to 12 t	18 euro	35 leva	81 lei
Trucks over 12 t with up to 3 axles; Vehicles with over 23 seats	25 euro	49 leva	113 lei
Trucks over 12 t with 4 or more axles	37 euro	72 leva	167 lei
Pedestrians; Cyclists	free	free	free

The toll is collected at toll booths, located on the Romanian side. They also served as border checkpoints until both Bulgaria and Romania entered the Schengen Area on 1 January 2025. The amount of toll was still the same in July 2025.

In June 2013, it was possible for cars coming from Bulgaria to drive over the bridge and turn around just before the toll gates and escape the tolls, as shown in this video, filmed in the first hour after the bridge had been opened for traffic. However, another video recorded in October 2014 shows that it is no longer possible to sneak through that parking lot and drive back over the bridge to Bulgaria for free.

== Gallery ==
- Images with the construction status of the bridge were posted regularly on the official website of the project, when it was under construction by FCC Construción.
- A live traffic camera was installed. As of October 2014, any vehicle driving from Vidin to Calafat could be seen on this webcam, pointing towards the Romanian bank of the Danube river. Vehicles driving into Bulgaria were hard to see, since they drive behind a crash barrier next to the railway track. This live traffic camera appears to have been offline since 2023.

== See also ==
- Bulgaria–Romania border
- Giurgiu–Ruse Friendship Bridge
- List of crossings of the Danube river
- List of bridges in Bulgaria
- List of bridges in Romania
- List of international bridges
