= Siege of Calafat =

1854 battle of the Crimean War

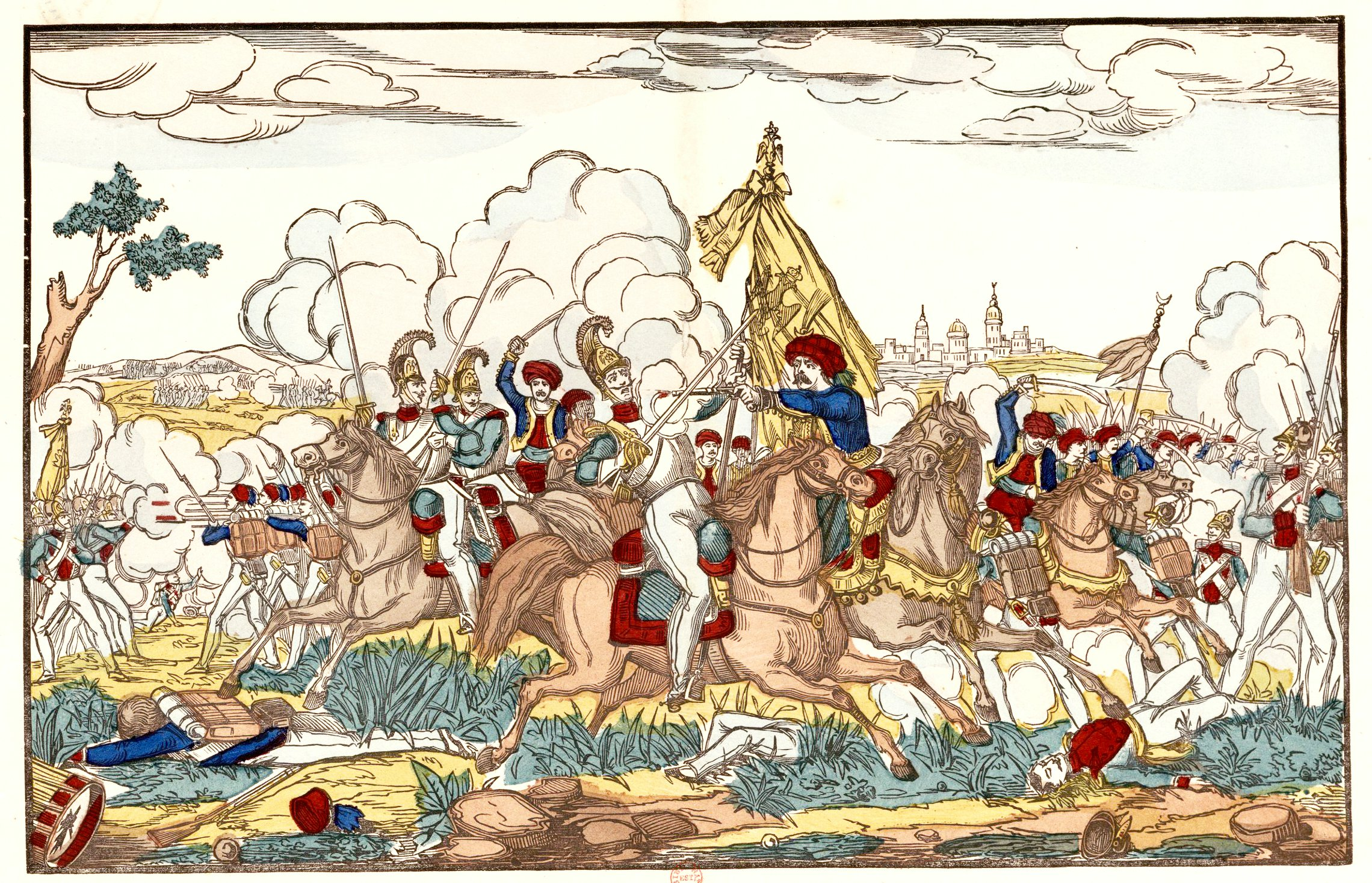
- Siege of Calafat by Fabrique de Pellerin
Date	February – May 1854
Location	Calafat, Wallachia 43°59′44.26″N 22°55′52.51″E
Result	Ottoman victory

Belligerents
Russian Empire	Ottoman Empire

Commanders and leaders
(Russian Empire) Joseph Carl von Anrep	(Ottoman Empire) Ahmed Pasha

Strength
40,000	30,000–36,000

Casualties and losses
23,000 (including the sick)	Unknown

The siege of Calafat took place in 1854 during the Crimean War. The Russians unsuccessfully besieged the Ottoman army at this place for four months before finally withdrawing.

In July 1853, the Russian army invaded the Principality of Wallachia, which was an Ottoman vassal. Their army had some 91,000 men under the command of Prince Gorchakoff, with some 240 field artillery and 90 siege guns. In response, war was declared by the Ottomans and they assembled an army of some 60–70,000 under the command of Omar Pasha. The Ottomans had several fortified fortresses on the southern side of the Danube river, of which Vidin was one. The Turks made several plans to advance into Wallachia. On 28 October their army in Vidin crossed the Danube and established itself at the village of Calafat, and started building fortifications. Another army crossed the Danube at Ruse on 1-2 November in a feint attack to lure the Russians away from Calafat. This operation was unsuccessful and they retreated on 12 November, but in the meantime Calafat's defenses and the communication with Vidin had been improved.

In response to these events, the Russians marched towards Calafat and unsuccessfully engaged the Turks at the end of December. They then entrenched themselves at Cetate, where they were attacked by the Turks. The Turks were led by Ahmed Pasha, the Russians by General Joseph Carl von Anrep. There were several days of fighting until 10 January, whereupon the Russians retreated towards Radovan. After January the Russians brought troops to the surroundings of Calafat and started the unsuccessful siege, which lasted 4 months; they withdrew on 21 April. During the siege the Russians suffered heavy losses from epidemics and attacks from the fortified Ottoman positions.
