= Executive Agency for Exploration and Maintenance of the Danube River =

Former Bulgarian government agency

The Executive Agency for Exploration and Maintenance of the Danube River (EAEMDR) of Bulgaria was established as an organization in 1935 under the name Danube Hydrographical Service within the structure of the Ministry of Railways, Post Offices and Telegraphs. The headquarters were situated in the city of Lom and the responsibilities of the Service were related to the maintenance of the waterway, creation of maps of the Danube River, conduction of hydro meteorological surveys in the Bulgarian section of the river.

== History ==
The Danube Hydrographical Service was established in 1935 to maintain the Bulgarian section of the Danube. In 1949, after the ratification of the “Convention for the sailing regime on the Danube River”, the Danube Hydrographical Service passed over to the Ministry of Defense – Danube Fleet.

Four years later the service was reinstated as a part of the Ministry of Railways, Post Offices and Telegraphs, and the Navigational Waterway Office was established in Ruse. In the year 1955 the organization passed over under the structure of the Bulgarian River Fleet and in the next year the Council of Ministers adopted a decree, by the force of which the Navigational Waterway Office was restructured into the “Administration for the Maintenance of the Navigational Waterway and Exploration of the Danube River” within the Ministry of Transport, Information technology and communications.

In December 1999 the Administration was transformed into the Executive Agency for Exploration and Maintenance of the Danube River.

== Functions ==
The functions of EAEMDR are related to:

- Ensuring safety of navigation in the common Bulgarian-Romanian section of the river;
- Studying the hydro morphological and hydrological conditions of the river in the Bulgarian section, processing the data from the studies and, on its basis, issuing guides, navigational maps, plans, yearbooks, reference books and other river navigational aids for the purposes of the Danube Commission and the Joint Bulgarian-Romanian commissions;
- Collecting and disseminating information regarding the condition of the waterway and navigational routes and for the hydro meteorological conditions;
- Alerting the respective authorities, ministries and administrations to the need of precautionary steps in case of foreseeable danger of flooding, banc erosions and others;
- Studying and approving projects for the construction of hydro technical and other infrastructure along the Danube River;
- Monitoring and approving the position of mining equipment with a view over navigational safety and the possibility of corrosion of banks and islands.

== International activities ==
The Agency works in cooperation with the inland waterway administrations in the other states along the Danube River. It takes part in workshops in the field of navigation and inland waterway maintenance and implements projects in the frames of the Danube Strategy of the EU, Bulgarian-Romanian commissions, the Danube Commission, GIS Forum.
