= Stambolov Bridge =

Covered Bridge (Стамболов мост)
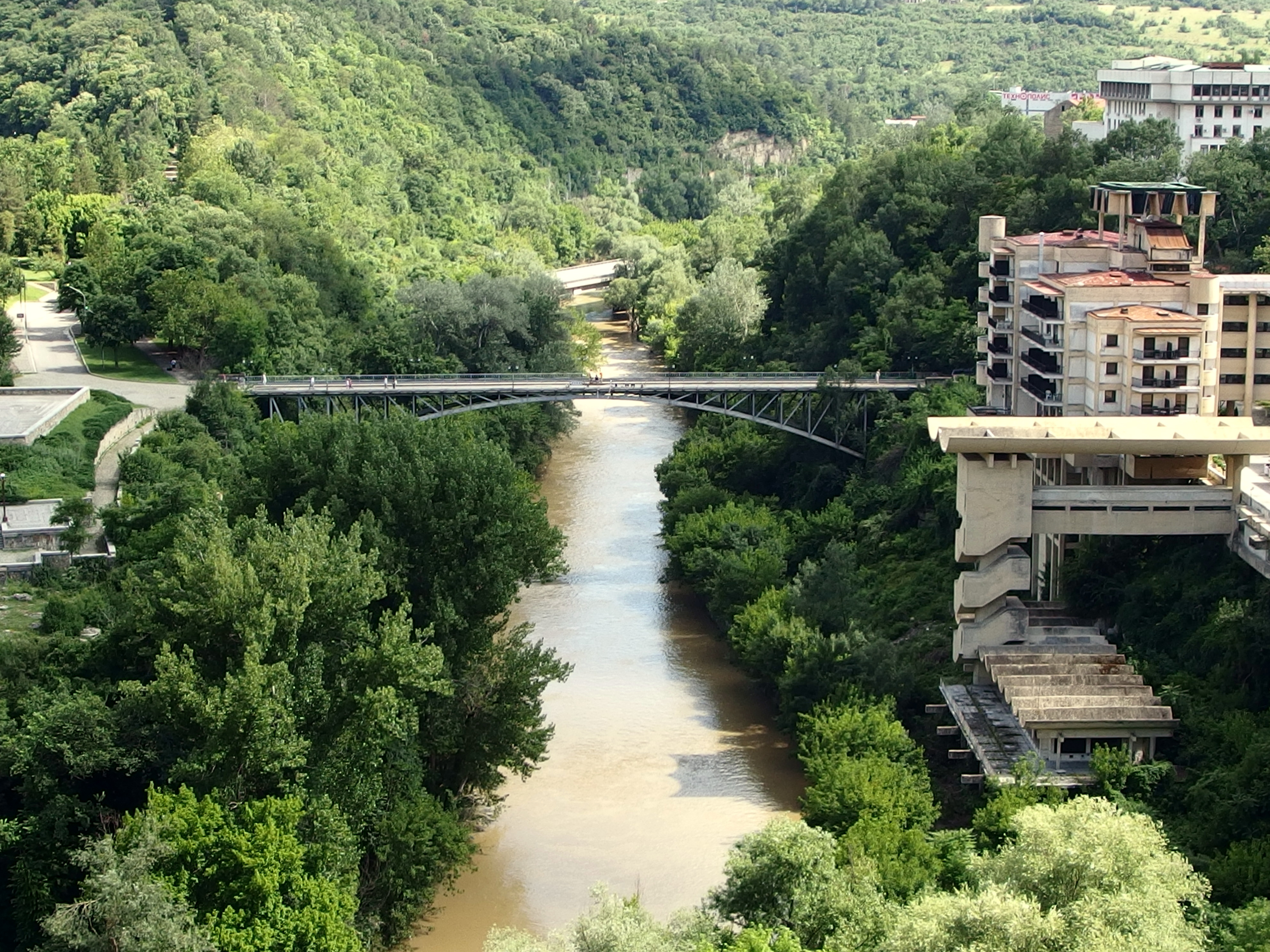
- Coordinates: 43°04′54″N 25°38′14″E
- Carries: pedestrians
- Crosses: the Yantra
- Locale: Veliko Tarnovo, Bulgaria

Characteristics
- Total length: 28 m

History
- Opened: 1900

Location
- Interactive map of Covered Bridge (Стамболов мост)

The Stambolov Bridge (Bulgarian: Стамболовия мост, Stambolovya most) is a bridge in the town of Veliko Tarnovo, Bulgaria.

Belgian, Italian, Bulgarian specialists and Bulgarian workers took part in the construction. On May 24, 1932, the legendary Bulgarian pilot Petko Popganchev flew a DAR 7 plane under the bridge. This caused a real sensation in the town.

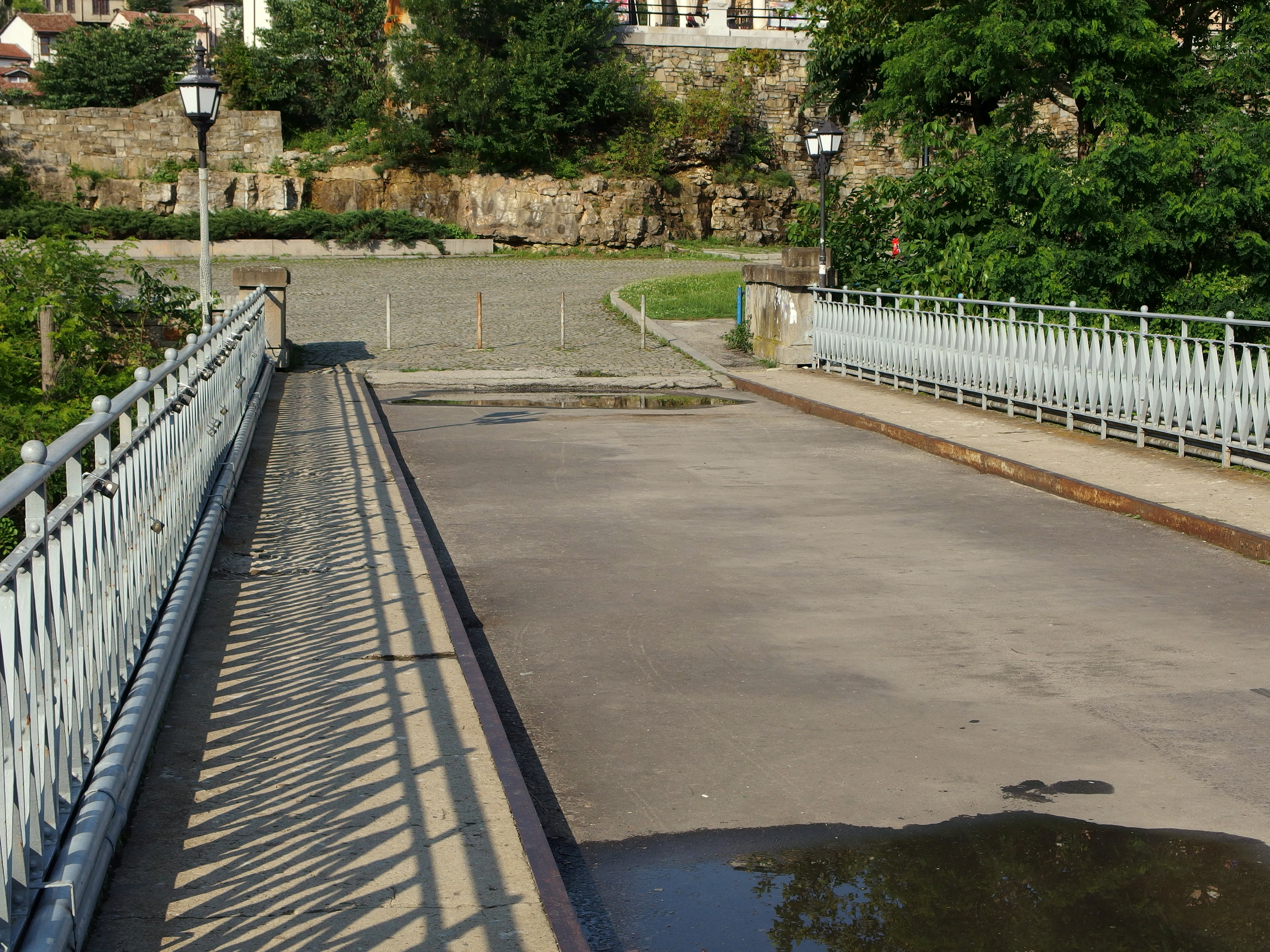

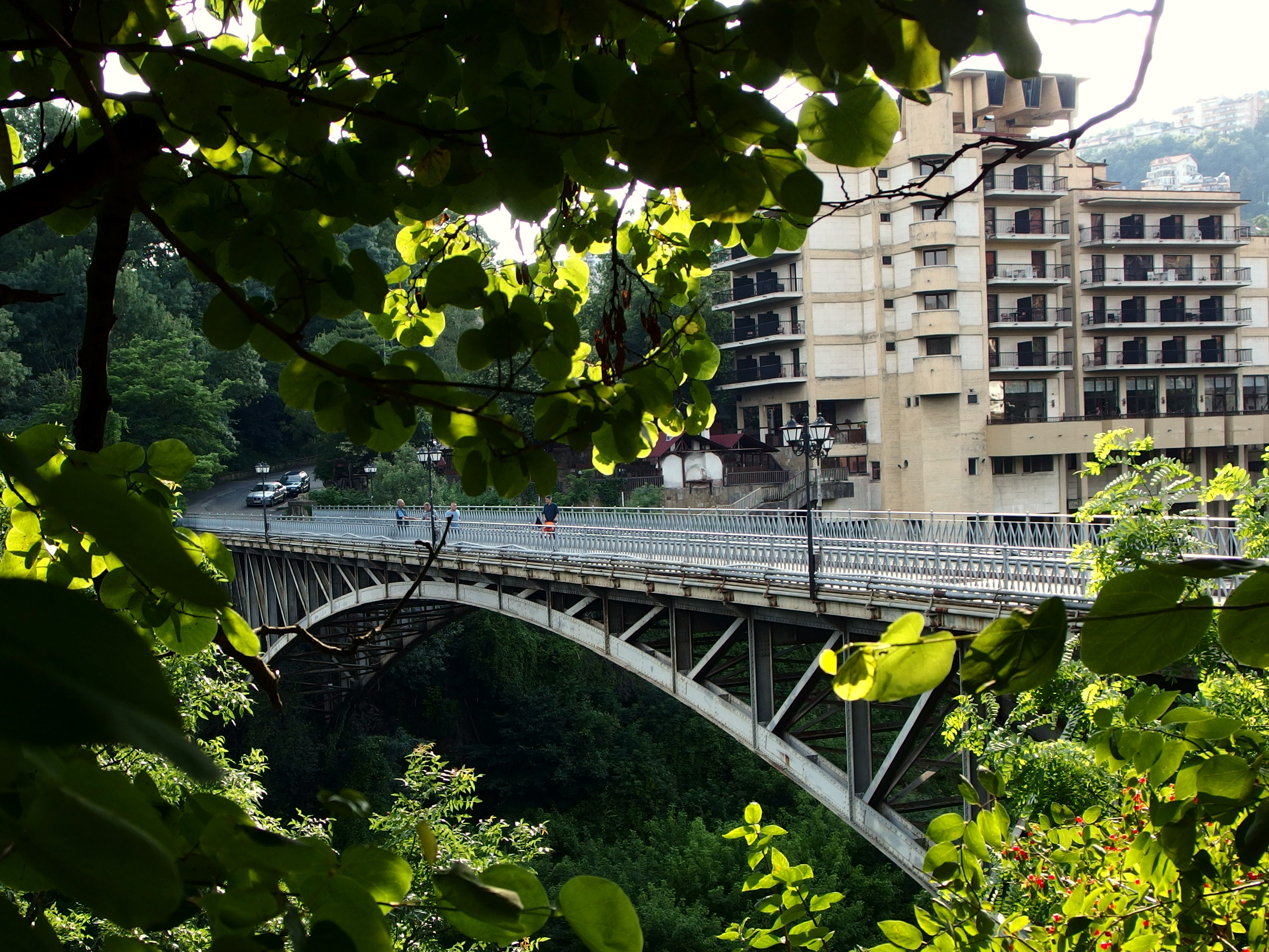

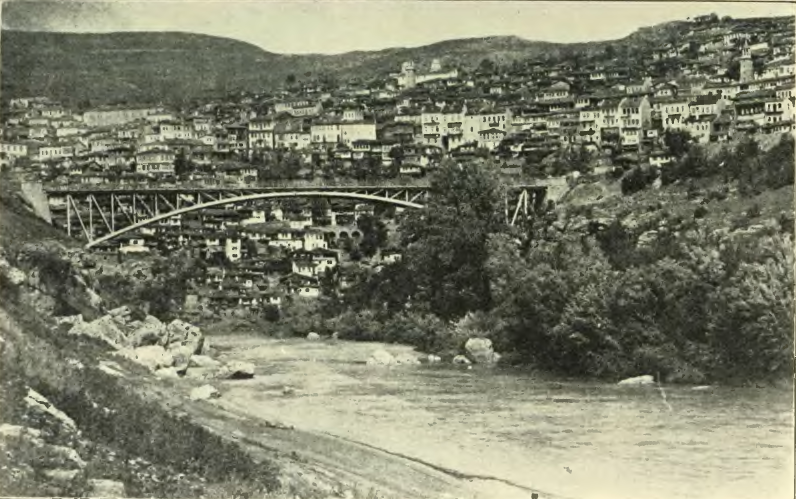
