= Calafat =

- Municipality
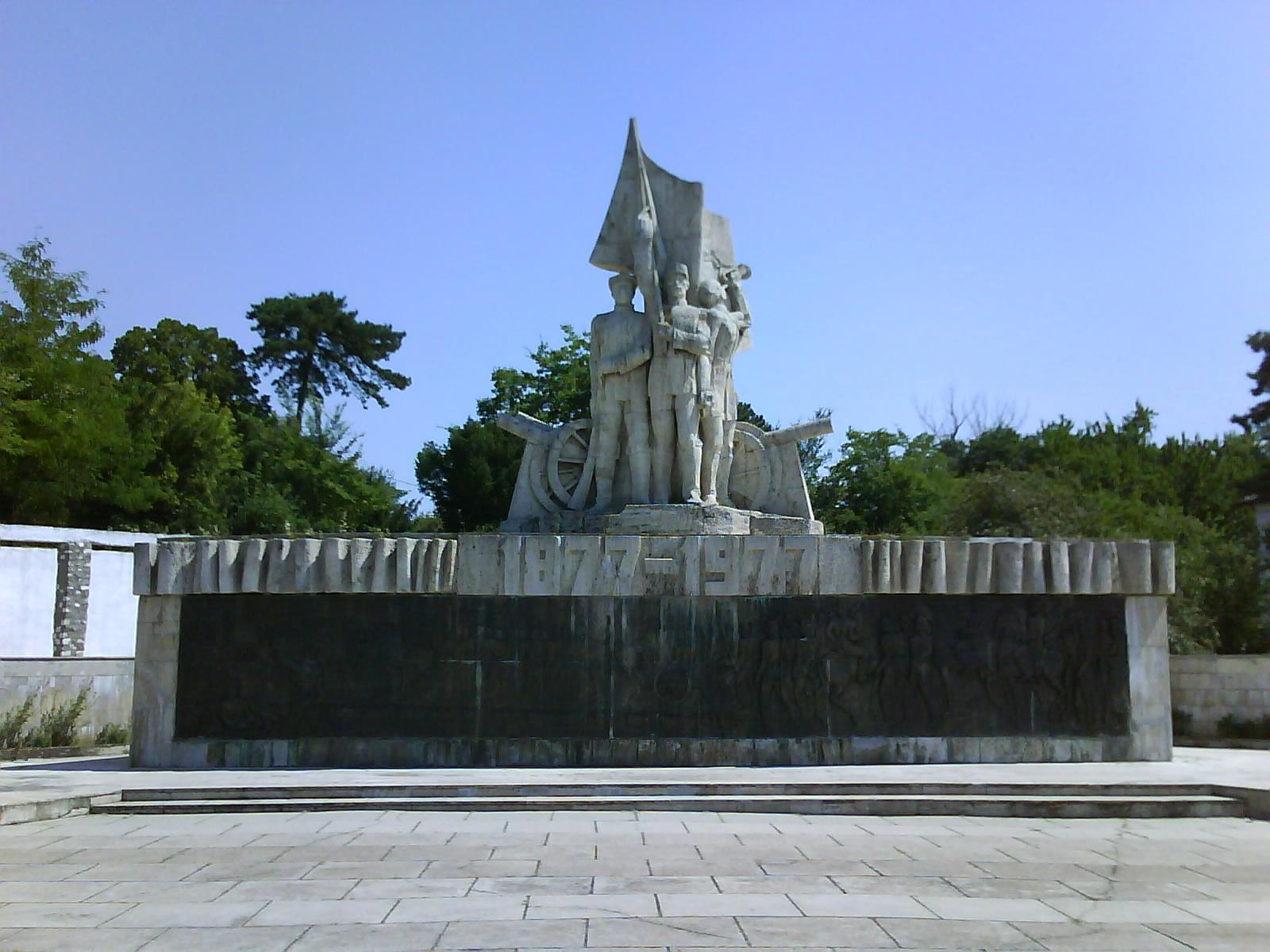
- The monument commemorating the soldiers who fought in the War of Independence in 1877

- Coat of arms

- Location in Romania
- Coordinates: 43°59′09″N 22°57′27″E
- Country: Romania
- County: Dolj

Government
  - Mayor (2024–2028): Mihai Cotea (PSD)
- Area: 103.59 km^{2} (40.00 sq mi)
- Elevation: 35 m (115 ft)
- Population (2021-12-01): 13,807
  - Density: 133.29/km^{2} (345.21/sq mi)
- Time zone: UTC+02:00 (EET)
  - Summer (DST): UTC+03:00 (EEST)
- Postal code: 205200
- Vehicle reg.: DJ
- Website: municipiulcalafat.ro

Calafat (Romanian pronunciation: [kalaˈfat]; Bulgarian: Калафат) is a city in Dolj County, southern Romania, in the region of Oltenia. It lies on the river Danube, opposite the Bulgarian city of Vidin, to which it is linked by the Calafat-Vidin Bridge, opened in 2013. After the destruction of the bridges of late antiquity, for centuries Calafat was connected with the southern bank of the Danube by boat, and later by ferryboat.

The city administers three villages: Basarabi, Golenți, and Ciupercenii Vechi.

== Etymology ==
According to historian Nicolae Iorga, the toponym "Calafatis" comes from the Byzantines and means "place where ships are tarred".

== History ==
It was founded in the 14th century by Genoese colonists. These colonists generally employed large numbers of workmen in repairing ships.

In January 1854, during the Crimean War, when Russian forces were headed up the Danube, Ahmed Pasha, commanding the Turkish forces at Calafat, made a surprise attack on the temporary Russian garrison nearby Cetate, which was under the command of Colonel Alexander Baumgarten. This diverted the initial Russian attack and allowed Ahmed Pasha to consolidate his forces in Calafat. On 28 January, the Russians under the command of General Joseph Carl von Anrep, reached Calafat and began the siege which lasted until May. Riddled by disease and unable to take the town, Anrep withdrew.

There used to be a small Greek community in Calafat since the Late Middle Ages, numbering about 165 people at the end of the 19th century. The Greek presence in the city was continued by political refugees, who arrived there after World War II. The community was re-established on 27 October 1996 by descendants of its old members and currently has approximately 80 official members. There is also a Greek Church in Calafat dedicated to Life-giving Spring since 1880s and there used to be a Greek language school.

Calafat was declared a municipiu in 1997.

== Climate ==
Climate data for Calafat (elevation 61m, 2014–2026 normals, extremes 1901–present)
Month	Jan	Feb	Mar	Apr	May	Jun	Jul	Aug	Sep	Oct	Nov	Dec	Year
Record high °C (°F)	20.6 (69.1)	23.8 (74.8)	28.4 (83.1)	34.5 (94.1)	36.6 (97.9)	41.3 (106.3)	44.3 (111.7)	42.2 (108.0)	39.8 (103.6)	31.6 (88.9)	27.9 (82.2)	21.2 (70.2)	44.3 (111.7)
Mean daily maximum °C (°F)	5.4 (41.7)	8.7 (47.7)	13.7 (56.7)	19.7 (67.5)	24.4 (75.9)	30.3 (86.5)	32.9 (91.2)	33.1 (91.6)	27.4 (81.3)	19.5 (67.1)	11.1 (52.0)	7.2 (45.0)	19.3 (66.7)
Daily mean °C (°F)	1.6 (34.9)	4.5 (40.1)	8.4 (47.1)	13.6 (56.5)	18.2 (64.8)	23.6 (74.5)	25.7 (78.3)	25.5 (77.9)	20.6 (69.1)	13.8 (56.8)	7.7 (45.9)	3.9 (39.0)	13.8 (56.8)
Mean daily minimum °C (°F)	−2.2 (28.0)	0.2 (32.4)	3.1 (37.6)	7.5 (45.5)	12.0 (53.6)	16.9 (62.4)	18.4 (65.1)	18.0 (64.4)	13.9 (57.0)	8.0 (46.4)	4.3 (39.7)	0.7 (33.3)	8.3 (46.9)
Record low °C (°F)	−29.2 (−20.6)	−24.6 (−12.3)	−15.7 (3.7)	−3.0 (26.6)	1.6 (34.9)	6.2 (43.2)	9.0 (48.2)	7.3 (45.1)	−1.3 (29.7)	−6.2 (20.8)	−16.2 (2.8)	−21.8 (−7.2)	−29.2 (−20.6)
Average precipitation mm (inches)	45.5 (1.79)	29.2 (1.15)	52.9 (2.08)	34.6 (1.36)	71.0 (2.80)	56.1 (2.21)	55.4 (2.18)	29.7 (1.17)	35.6 (1.40)	55.2 (2.17)	69.4 (2.73)	42.8 (1.69)	577.4 (22.73)
Average precipitation days	7.5	6.4	7.6	5.6	8.9	6.7	5.2	4.5	4.8	6.3	8.3	3.8	75.6
Source 1: Meteomanz (2014-2026)
Source 2: Anuarul Statistic al României

Historical population
Year	Pop.	±%
1900	7,113	—
1912	7,608	+7.0%
1930	7,633	+0.3%
1948	8,251	+8.1%
1956	8,069	−2.2%
1966	9,483	+17.5%
1977	15,568	+64.2%
1992	20,445	+31.3%
2002	21,227	+3.8%
2011	16,247	−23.5%
2021	13,807	−15.0%
Source: Census data

== Transport ==
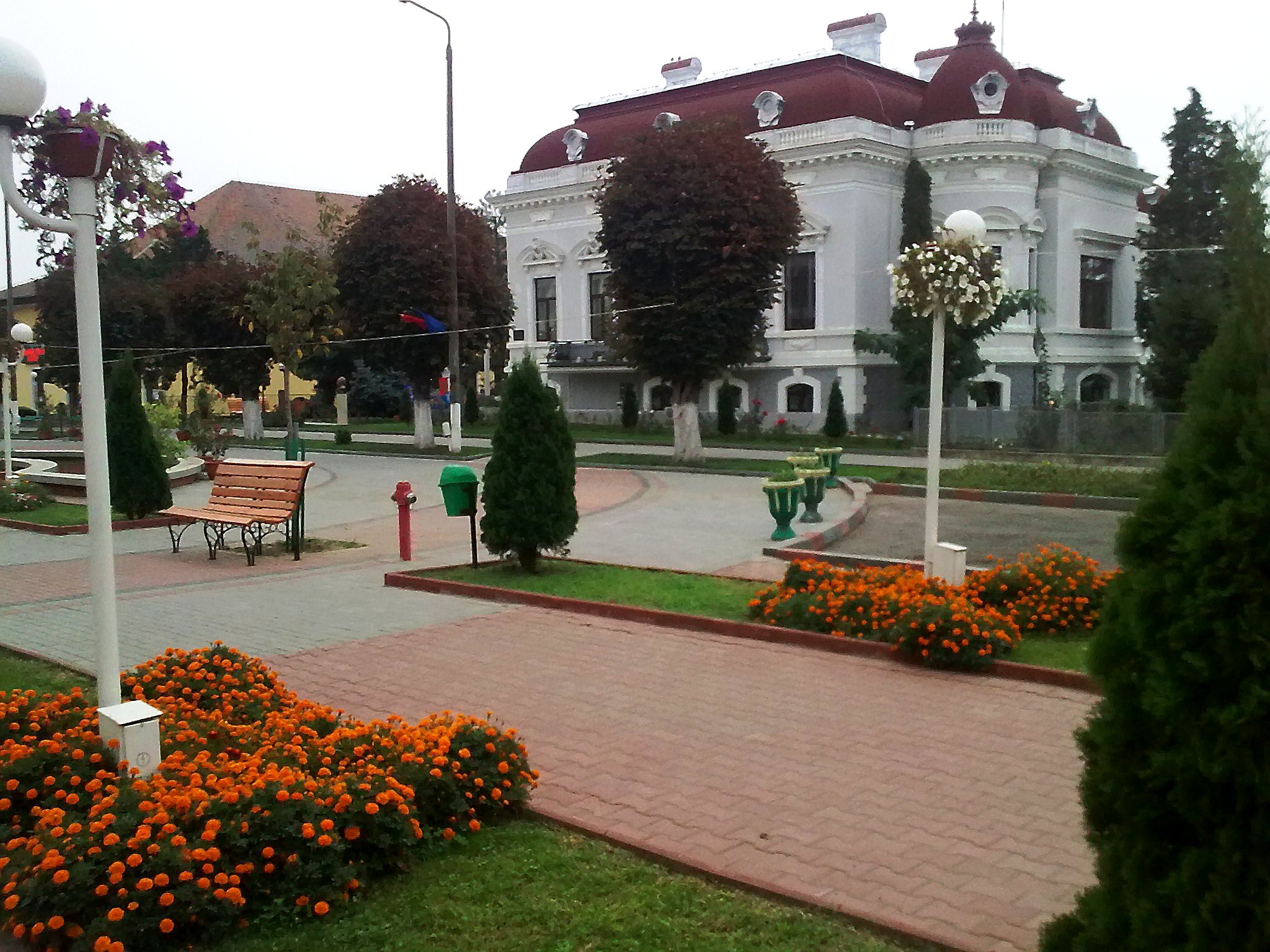
Calafat City Hall

Calafat lies on the river corridor VII-Danube and the pan-European corridor IV, which starts in Germany and ends in Istanbul and Thessaloniki. The city is at the crossroads of National Roads DN56, DN56A, and DN55A and European route E79. The city of Calafat and its neighbour, Vidin (Bulgaria), are linked by a bridge over the Danube in the area called Bașcov (Danube Bridge 2), built by the Spanish company FCC. The project of constructing a Danubian bridge in the area of Calafat–Vidin dates back to 1925. Road traffic between Vidin and Calafat was doubling every year, so it became necessary to construct a bridge with four lanes of road traffic, a railway line, a lane two meters wide for bikes and a pavement for pedestrians. The bridge has a total length of 1,971 m (6,467 ft) and its cost is estimated at US$200 million. It was officially opened on 14 June 2013.

== Newspapers ==
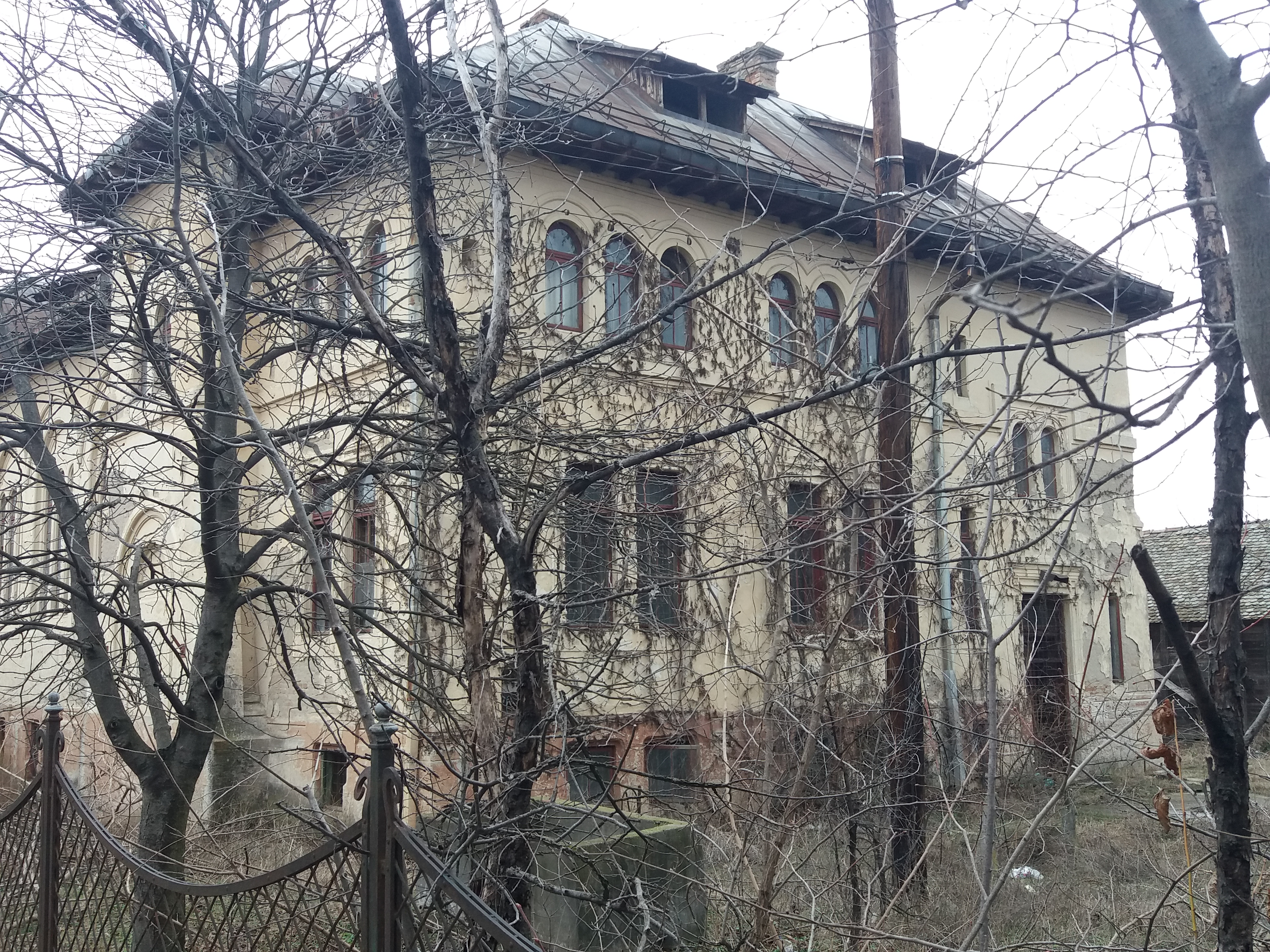
Old post office

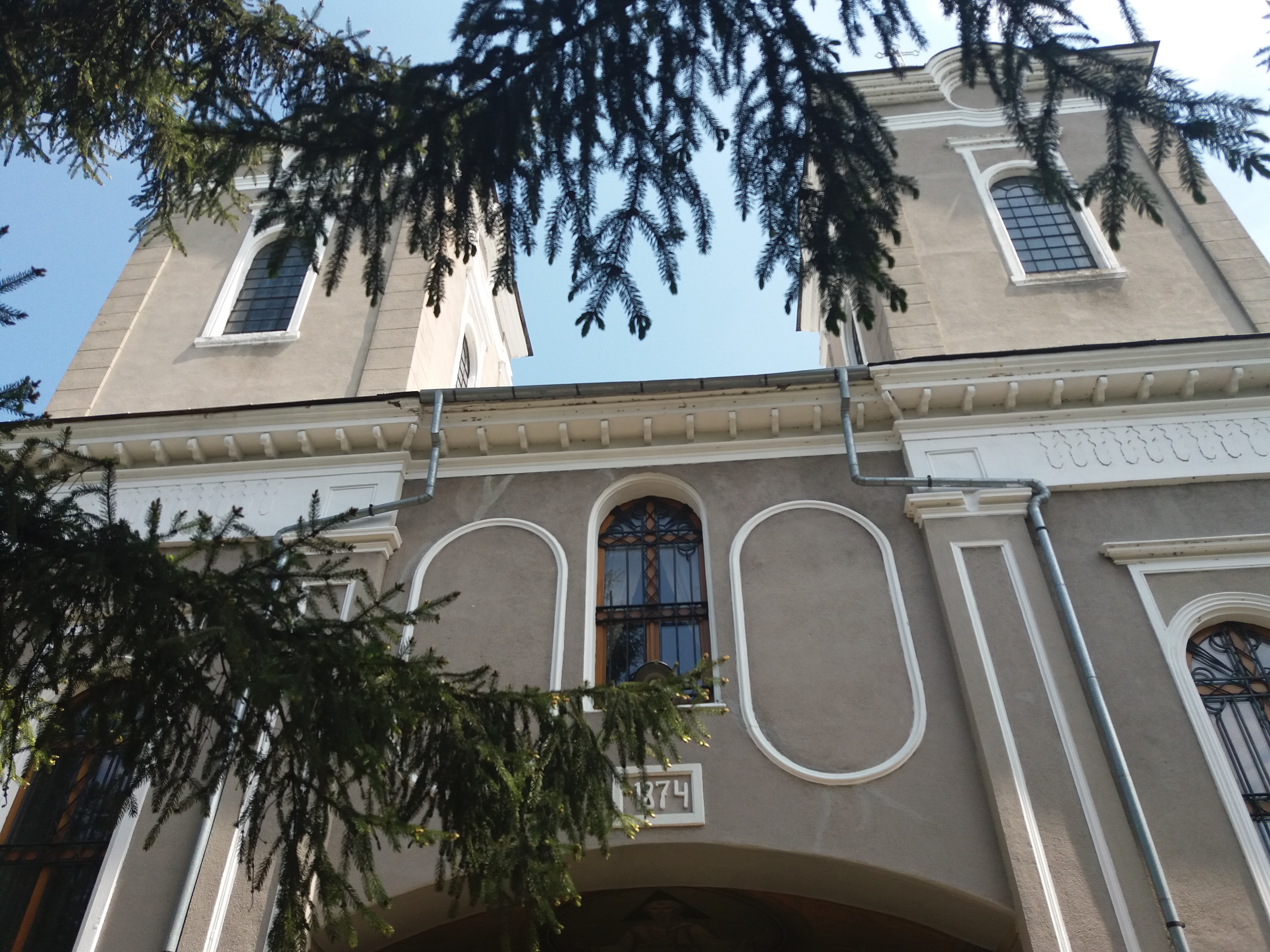
Greek Church of Life-giving Spring

Calafat has several city newspapers. One of them is called Ziarul De Calafat, which is also maintained online; another one is Calafat Live.

== International relations ==
=== Twin towns — Sister cities ===
Calafat is twinned with:

- Vidin, Bulgaria
- Zaječar, Serbia
- Biñan, Philippines
