= Antheia (disambiguation) =

Antheia was a figure in Greek mythology.

Antheia or Anthea (ancient Greek: Ἄνθεια) may also refer to:

- Anthea, a given name
- Antheia (Achaea), a town of ancient Achaea, Greece
- Antheia (Argolis), a town of ancient Argolis, Greece
- Antheia (Messenia), a town of ancient Messenia, Greece
- Antheia (restaurant), a restaurant based in Ottawa, Canada
- Antheia (Thessaly), a town of ancient Thessaly, Greece
- Antheia (Thrace), a town of ancient Thrace, now in Bulgaria
- Antheia, Evros, a town in Greece
- Antheia, Patras, a neighbourhood of Patras, Greece
- Antheia, ancient name of Sozopol, Bulgaria
- Antheia, the name of one of the Hesperides
