= Nikola Georgiev – Kayo =

Bulgarian artist

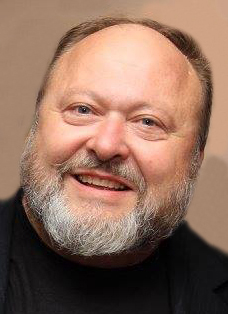
- Nikola Georgiev
- Born: Nikola Georgiev; January 28, 1963 (age 63); Samokov, Bulgaria
- Known for: Artist painter, cartoonist, illustrator

Nikola Georgiev (Bulgarian: Никола Георгиев, born January 28, 1963, Samokov, Bulgaria) is a Bulgarian artist who works in the field of painting, illustration, caricature, graphic design and animation.

== Biography ==
He was born on January 28, 1963, in Samokov. His childhood passed between Sozopol on the Black Sea and the village of Gorni Okol. He studied at the National School of Fine Arts "Iliya Petrov" and Culturology at the New Bulgarian University. He is a member of the Union of Bulgarian Artists and the International organization of cartoonists FEKO. In the newspaper "Vseki Den" (“Every Day”) he ran a daily author's column with a cartoon. He ran weekly cartoon columns in the newspapers "Novinar", "Weekend", "Az-Buki" too.

== Creativity ==
Nikola Georgiev's style is defined as "academic naivety". His paintings are full of strange creatures, filled with grotesque and a little sadness because of human imperfection and helplessness. For him, the landscape is rather a rarity as a stand-alone work. Often, with his bright colours, the artist believes making the problems of everyday life more bearable. His works are also known from publications in periodicals. He had exhibitions of paintings and of cartoons, as a number of participations in general exhibitions. He has won several awards for satirical painting and caricature.

== Gallery ==
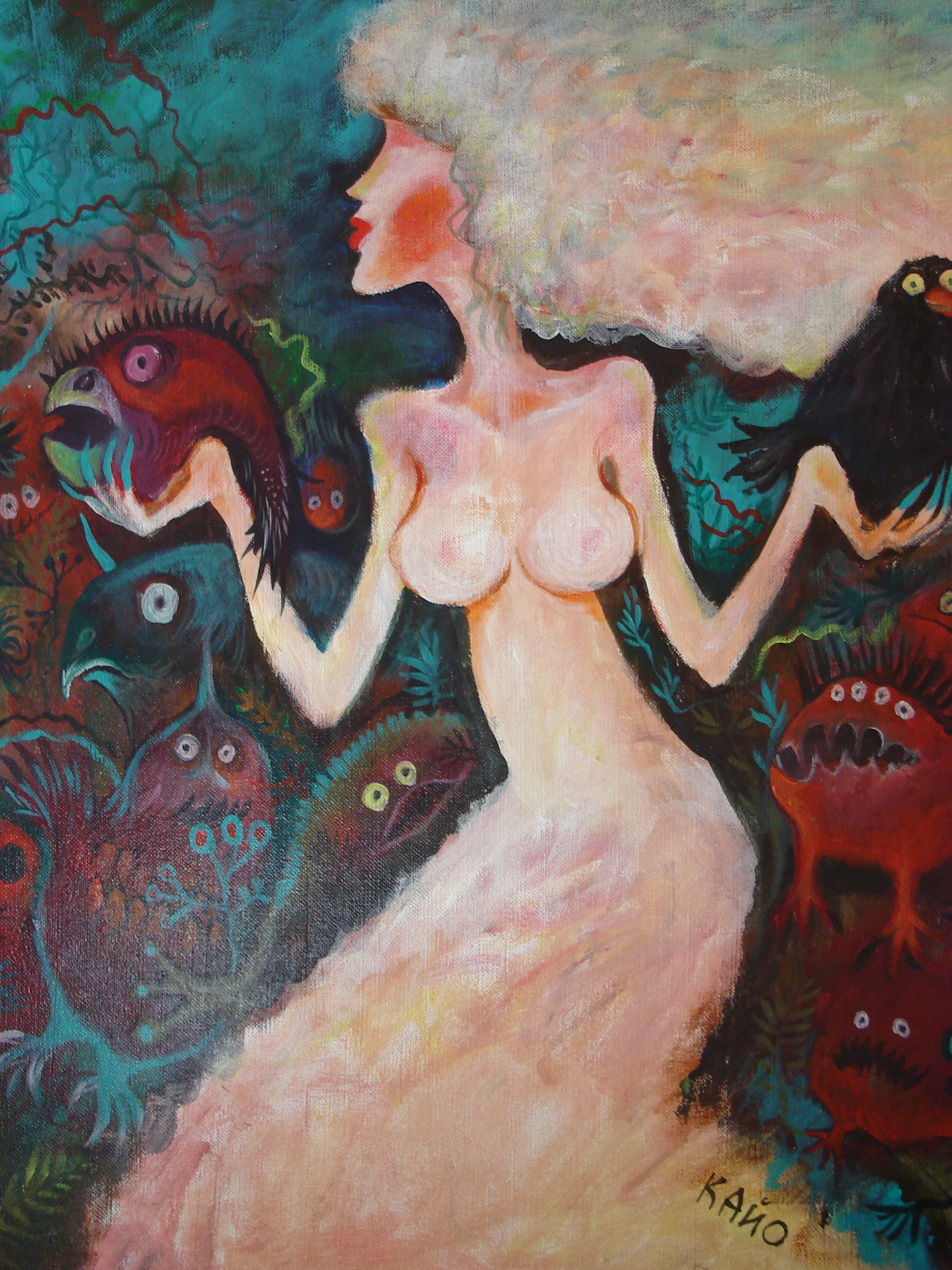
Samodiva, 2003

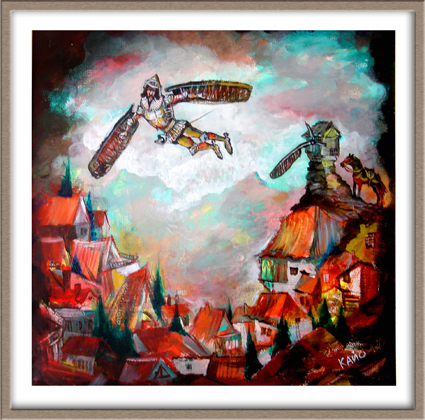
My Don Quixote, 2005

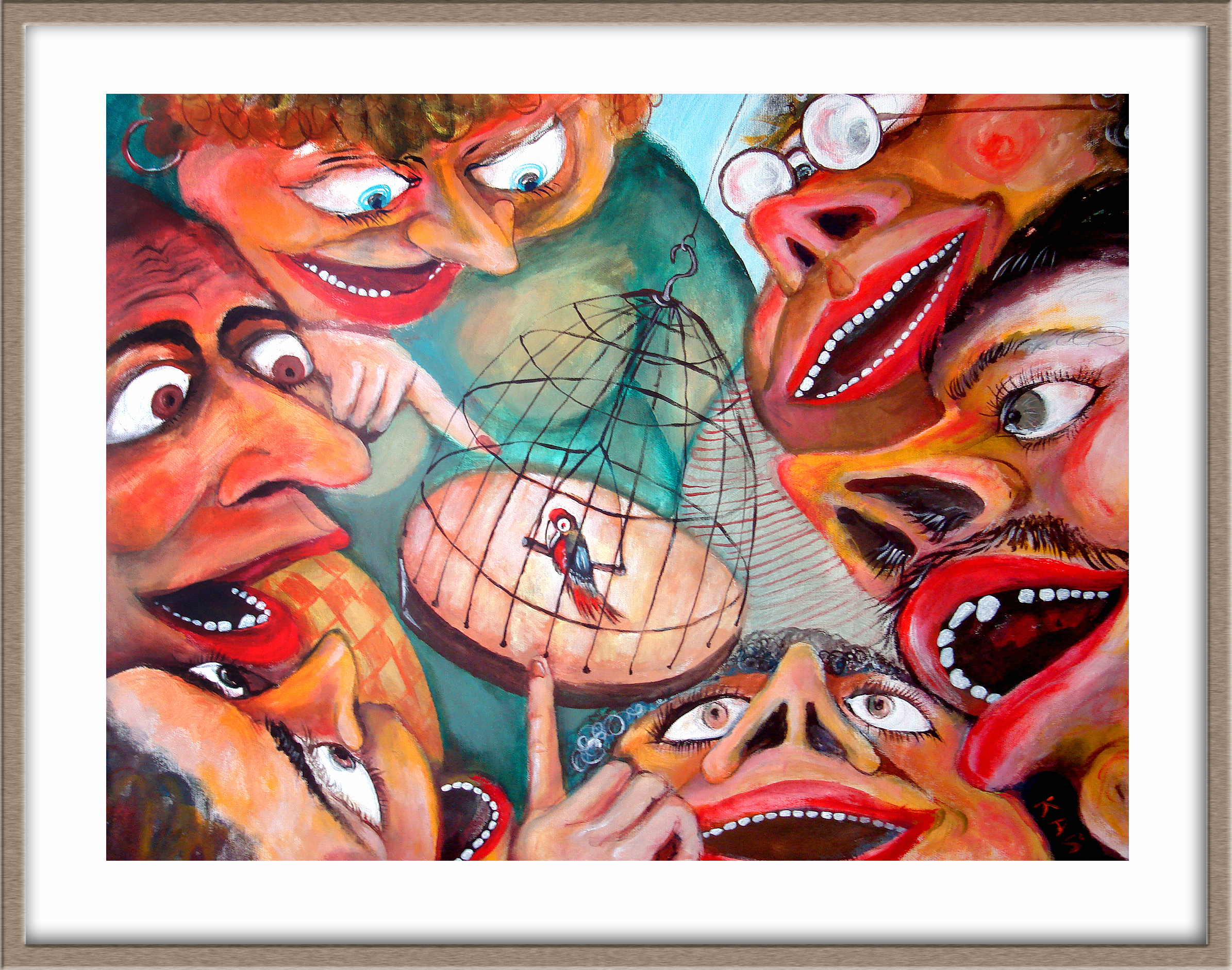
A pet, 2008

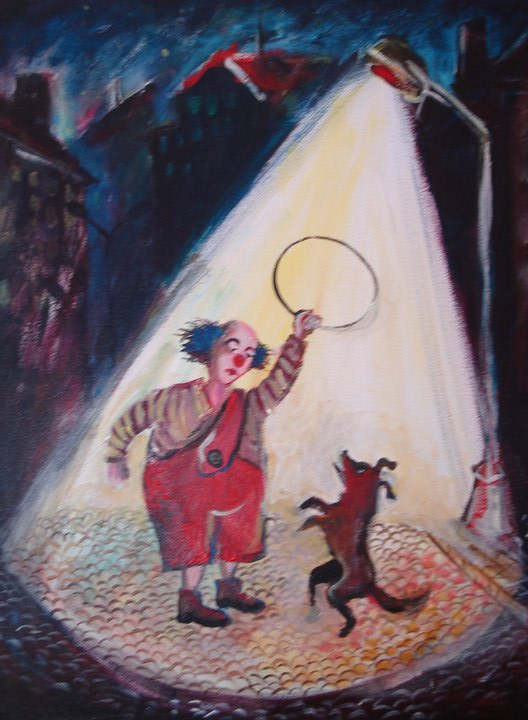
The retired clown, 2015

== Additional references ==
- Nikola Georgiev: The free man fights for a perfection (In Bulgarian: Никола Георгиев: Свободният се бори за съвършенство), www.sbj-bg.eu, 30.09.2015, Retrieved 20 March 2021
