= Mary Haskell =

Mary Haskell may refer to:

- Mary M. Haskell (1869–1953), American congregationalist missionary
- Mary Haskell (educator) (1873–1964), American educator
