= Vladimir Breitchev =

Bulgarian ski jumper

Vladimir Breitchev (Bulgarian: Владимир Брейчев; born December 16, 1958, in Samokov) is a Bulgarian ski jumper that came at the 19th place in the Olympic Games in the K-70 metre hill in 1984, which was the best result for Bulgaria in ski jumping at the Winter Olympics until 2018 where Vladimir Zografski finished 14th in the Men's Normal Hill competition. Breitchev also competed in Calgary 1988 and in Albertville 1992,

Breitchev has also won the 1983-84 Europa Cup.
