= Joachim Winterlich =

German ski jumper and coach

Personal information
- Born: 17 March 1942 (age 84) Oberwiesenthal, Germany

Sport
- Sport: Skiing
- Club: SC Traktor Oberwiesenthal

World Cup career
- Seasons: 1960-1967
- Updated on January 2009

Joachim Winterlich (born 17 March 1942) is a retired German ski jumper and an active ski jumping coach.

== Biography ==
Winterlich was born in Oberwiesenthal, Saxony.

=== Ski jumping career ===
Winterlich was a member of the SC Traktor Oberwiesenthal ski jumping club. In three successive years (1965, 1966 and 1967), he represented the club and placed third in the East German Nordic combined championship.

=== Ski jumping coach ===
Winterlich has been the trainer and assistant trainer for several countries including Kazakhstan, Germany, Switzerland and Bulgaria. He is a former coach of Jens Weißflog, the most successful German ski jumper of all time, who retired in 1996. He has been critical of the coaching of junior ski jumpers in Germany, citing bad results from up-and-comers such as the 18-year-old Tobias Bogner. In July 2007, three years before his contract was to expire in 2010, Winterlich officially left the role as main instructor of Team Kazakhstan. As of 2008, he is the main trainer of the Bulgaria Ski Jumping Team. Winterlich spends most of his time coaching Vladîmir Zografski, the best Bulgarian ski jumper. He also helps with the coaching of Deyan Funtarov and Bogomil Pavlov. The assistant trainers for Bulgaria are Emil Zografski (Vladimir's father) and Nikolatta Lembakov. Winterlich also caused a major improvement in team Kazakhstan. He worked much with Radik Zhaparov, one of the best jumpers from Kazakhstan.

== Contributions to the sport ==
In 2002, Winterlich invented a glass ceramic inrun trail at the Bischofsgrün ski jumping facility in Germany. Together with the already existing plastic mats, it allows ski jumping in both summer and winter. Winterlich also helped to improve the jumping arena in Garmisch Partenkirchen.
