= Cherniyat kos =

Coordinates: 42°20′14″N 23°33′27″E

- Samokov
- Location: Samokov; Bulgaria
- Operator: SC Samokov

Size
- K–point: 40 m
- Hill size: 47 m
- Hill record: 42 m, Petar Fartunov (26.09.2004)

Cherniyat kos is a ski jumping venue in Samokov, Bulgaria. The venue includes three hills, K40, K25 and the small K10. The hills are covered with plastic matting during the summer. Every summer youth competitions are hosted, in order to train Bulgarian ski jumpers.

The hills have inrun trails made of stainless steel but the plastic mattings are in bad quality and already over 20 years old.

The active professional ski jumpers Vladimir Zografski and Deyan Funtarov are both from Samokov and started training in these hills.
