= Vladimir Zografski =

Bulgarian ski jumper (born 1993)

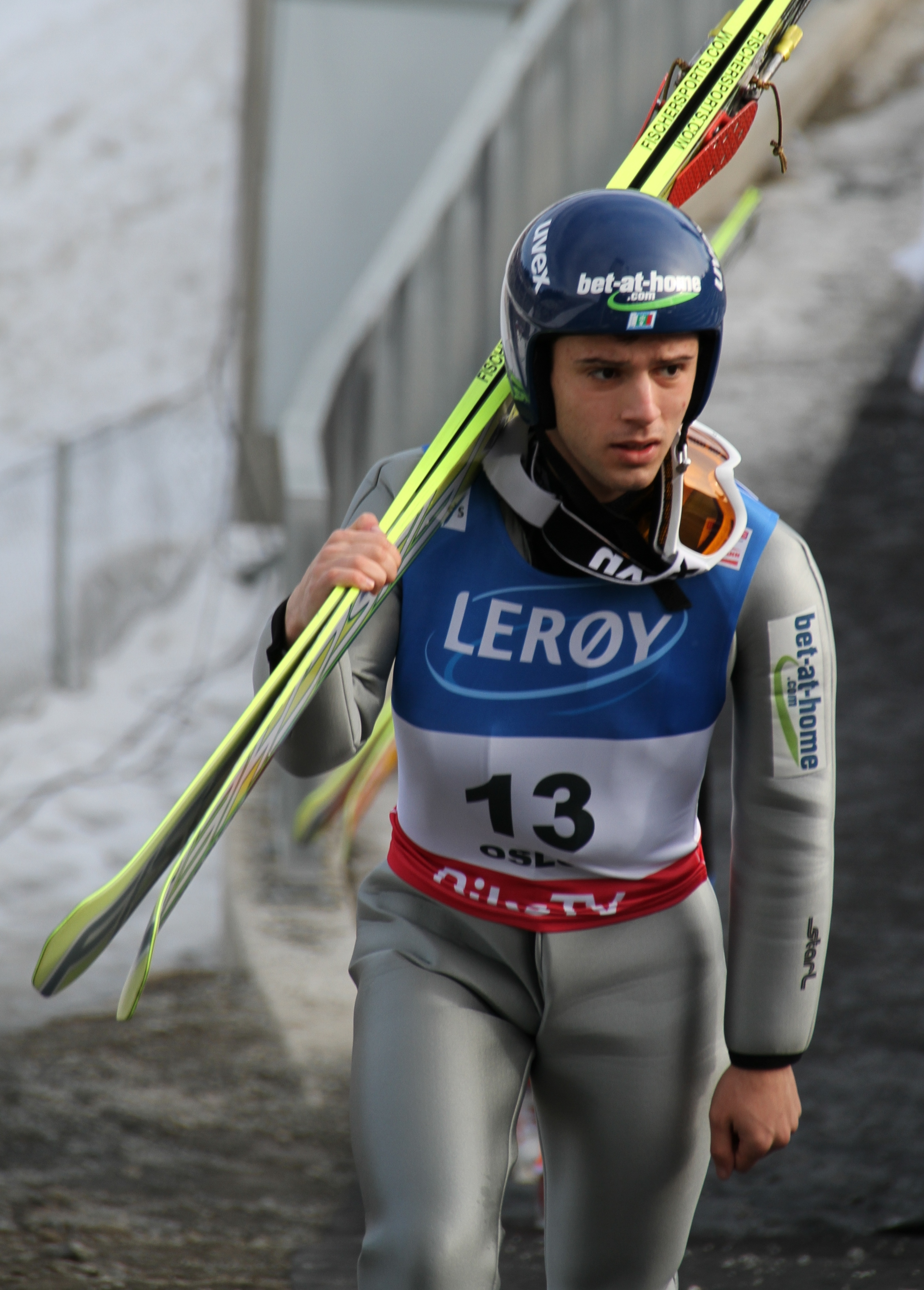
- Zografski at the Holmenkollen World Cup (2012)

Personal information
- Nationality: Bulgaria
- Born: 14 July 1993 (age 33) Samokov, Bulgaria
- Height: 1.59 m (5 ft 3 in)

Sport
- Sport: Ski jumping
- Club: SC Samokov

World Cup career
- Seasons: 2009–present
- Indiv. starts: 264
- Indiv. podiums: 1

Achievements and titles
- Personal bests: 215 m (705 ft); Oberstdorf, 24 January 2025; Planica, 29 March 2026
Medal record
Men's ski jumping
Winter Universiade
Gold medal – first place	2015 Osrblie	Individual NH
Nordic Junior World Ski Championships
Gold medal – first place	2011 Otepää	Individual NH
European Youth Olympic Festival
Silver medal – second place	2009 Szczyrk	Individual NH
- Updated on 29 March 2026

Vladimir Zografski (Bulgarian: Владимир Зографски; born 14 July 1993) is a Bulgarian ski jumper. He took 14th place at the normal hill individual event at the 2018 Winter Olympics, which was the best result for a Bulgarian ski jumper in Olympic history, beating Vladimir Breitchev's 19th place at the 1984 Winter Olympics. Zografski is the son of former Olympic ski jumper Emil Zografski.

Zografski's instructors are Joachim Winterlich, the trainer of the successful German ski jumper Jens Weißflog, and his father Emil Zografski. Vladimir has a younger brother, Martin Zografski, who is also a ski jumper and part of the Bulgarian development team.

On 6 March 2026 in Lahti he reached third place and became the first ever Bulgarian ski jumper in history, both men or women, who achieved the World Cup podium.

== Career ==
=== Early years and World Cup debut (2005–2010) ===
Zografski's started jumping at an early age in the plastic-covered hills at Chernia kos near his hometown of Samokov. His debut in the Ski jumping Continental Cup took place in 2005 when Zografski was 12 years old. In 2007 he made his debut in the Junior World Championships in Tarvisio, Italy, finishing last. His best placement in the 2008 Ski Jumping Fis-Cup was fourth place in Oberwiesenthal, while he managed 23rd in Villach during the 2008 Continental Cup.

Zografski made his World Cup debut in December 2008, finishing 43rd in Pragelato. He then received the silver medal at the 2009 European Olympic Youth Festival in Silesia, before finishing 43rd in the Normal Hill competition during the 2009 World Championships in Liberec. Zografski recorded his best-ever WC placement during a 2009 Summer Grand-Prix competition in Klingenthal, finishing 36th. He ended up 9th at Bischofshofen 2010 for the Ski jumping Continental Cup, his best result in the competition.

During the winter of 2010, Zografski participated in the Junior World Championships in Hinterzarten, Germany, finishing 7th with jumps of 104 and 99 meters. He finished 4th in a summer CoC competition in Garmisch-Partenkirchen and made it to the second round of the Summer Grand Prix (SGP) a week later, eventually finishing in 17th and recording his first points at the highest level of ski jumping competition. In August 2010, Zografski reached a new career high by finishing 5th at the SGP in Courchevel, and later won silver twice at the Continental Cup in Almaty, Kazakhstan.

=== First World Cup points and international breakthrough (2011–2013) ===
The 2010/11 season did not start well in Kuusamo and Kuopio, but in Engelberg, Zografski got his first World Cup points ever thanks to 28th- and 23rd-place finishes. He continued with 16th and 19th place in Oberstdorf and Garmisch-Partenkirchen during the 2011 Four Hills Tournament but was disqualified in Innsbruck for fielding skis that were deemed too long. The event later started a major conflict in ski jumping, with Zografski's father and coach Emil Zografski arguing that Eastern European athletes and lesser-known jumpers were being treated worse by the FIS. Zografski failed to reach the final 4HT competition in Bischofshofen and finished 37th overall with 450.6 points. In 2011 he also won the Junior World Championships in Otepää, Estonia, ahead of Kaarel Nurmsalu.

In 2011–12 Zografski had his major international breakthrough. After finishing 12th at the Summer Grand Prix and picking up a few top-5 placements, he started the World Cup season in Kuusamo. Although not able to pick up any wins or podiums, Zografski established himself as one of the top athletes in the World Cup. His best performance was 8th place at Lillehammer, though he frequently finished in the top 20. By this time, Zografski was also becoming more known in his home country Bulgaria and started receiving features in TV, radio and print media. He also won the Winter Sports Performance of the Year award in Bulgaria due to his World Championship win in Otepää. The latter part of the season found Zografski in poorer form, as he failed to qualify for several World Cup events. He finished the season with 20th place in Holmenkollen, Oslo, with a total of 61 points and an overall rank of 45th.

In April 2012, Zografski was sidelined for a while due to an arm injury but returned for the first Grand Prix competition in Poland. As in the previous year, he was very successful in the Summer Grand Prix, finishing 13th overall, with a 4th-place finish in Hakuba being the highlight. During the 2012–13 World Cup season, Zografski picked up points in several competitions, ending the season in 33rd place overall with a personal best points tally of 183.

=== Olympic Games and new career highs (2014–present) ===
At the 2018 Winter Olympics, Zografski took 14th place at the normal hill individual event and 35th at the large hill individual event. The former was the best-ever finish for a Bulgarian ski jumper at the Olympics, beating the previous record held by Vladimir Breitchev, who finished 19th on the K-70 hill at the 1984 games.

In November 2018, Zografski finished 6th in Ruka, bettering his record for the best result by a Bulgarian jumper in a World Cup race. On 29 November 2025, he beat his own record once more by finishing 4th in Ruka during the 2025–26 season.

== Major tournament results ==
=== Winter Olympics ===
Year	Place	Individual		Team		
Year	Place	Normal	Large	Men	Super	Mixed
2014	(Russia) Sochi	q	47	—	N/A	N/A
2018	(South Korea) Pyeongchang	14	35	—	N/A	N/A
2022	(China) Beijing	22	38	—	N/A	—
2026	(Italy) Milan Cortina	32	10	N/A	—	—

=== FIS Nordic World Ski Championships ===
Year	Place	Individual		Team		
Year	Place	Normal	Large	Normal	Large	Mixed
2009	(Czech Republic) Liberec	43	q	N/A	—	N/A
2011	(Norway) Oslo	34	37	—	—	N/A
2013	(Italy) Val di Fiemme	40	31	N/A	—	—
2015	(Sweden) Falun	30	47	N/A	—	—
2017	(Finland) Lahti	42	DSQ	N/A	—	—
2019	(Austria) Seefeld	37	DSQ	N/A	—	—
2021	(Germany) Oberstdorf	43	37	N/A	—	—
2023	(Slovenia) Planica	19	32	N/A	—	—
2025	(Norway) Trondheim	9	17	N/A	—	—

=== FIS Ski Flying World Championships ===
Year	Place	Individual	Team
2022	(Norway) Vikersund	34	—
2024	(Austria) Bad Mitterndorf	40	—
2026	(Germany) Oberstdorf	23	—

== World Cup ==
=== Standings ===
Season	Overall	4H	SF	RA
2008/09	—	—	—	N/A
2009/10	—	—	—	N/A
2010/11	53	37	—	N/A
2011/12	45	44	—	N/A
2012/13	33	22	32	N/A
2013/14	—	—	—	N/A
2014/15	70	54	—	N/A
2015/16	67	46	—	N/A
2016/17	—	52	—	—
2017/18	52	60	44	39
2018/19	33	18	44	59
2019/20	41	61	32	43
2020/21	56	40	—	N/A
2021/22	50	36	—	46
2022/23	39	36	—	54
2023/24	37	51	—	47
2024/25	29	26	33	34
2025/26	20	14	35	N/A

=== Individual starts (264) ===
winner (1); second (2); third (3); did not compete (–); failed to qualify (q); did not start (DNS); disqualified (DQ); - points finish
Season	1	2	3	4	5	6	7	8	9	10	11	12	13	14	15	16	17	18	19	20	21	22	23	24	25	26	27	28	29	30	31	32	Points
2008/09	Kuusamo	Trondheim	Trondheim	Pragelato	Pragelato	Engelberg	Engelberg	Oberstdorf	Garmisch-Partenkirchen	Innsbruck	Bischofshofen	Tauplitz	Tauplitz	Zakopane	Zakopane	Whistler	Whistler	Sapporo	Willingen	Klingenthal	Oberstdorf	Lahti	Kuopio	Lillehammer	Vikersund	Planica	Planica						0
2008/09	q	–	–	q	43	q	q	q	–	–	–	–	–	–	–	–	–	–	–	55	–	–	–	–	–	–	–						0
2009/10	Kuusamo	Lillehammer	Lillehammer	Engelberg	Engelberg	Engelberg	Oberstdorf	Garmisch-Partenkirchen	Innsbruck	Bischofshofen	Bad Mitterndorf	Bad Mitterndorf	Sapporo	Sapporo	Zakopane	Zakopane	Oberstdorf	Klingenthal	Willingen	Lahti	Kuopio	Lillehammer	Oslo										0
2009/10	–	q	q	q	49	q	q	q	–	–	–	–	q	q	–	–	–	q	46	–	–	–	–										0
2010/11	Kuusamo	Kuopio	Lillehammer	Lillehammer	Engelberg	Engelberg	Engelberg	Oberstdorf	Garmisch-Partenkirchen	Innsbruck	Bischofshofen	Harrachov	Harrachov	Sapporo	Sapporo	Zakopane	Zakopane	Zakopane	Willingen	Klingenthal	Oberstdorf	Vikersund	Vikersund	Lahti	Planica	Planica							38
2010/11	DQ	48	–	–	28	47	23	16	19	DQ	35	–	–	–	–	–	–	–	–	31	–	–	–	49	–	–							38
2011/12	Kuusamo	Lillehammer	Lillehammer	Harrachov	Harrachov	Engelberg	Engelberg	Oberstdorf	Garmisch-Partenkirchen	Innsbruck	Bischofshofen	Bad Mitterndorf	Bad Mitterndorf	Zakopane	Zakopane	Sapporo	Sapporo	Predazzo	Predazzo	Willingen	Oberstdorf	Lahti	Trondheim	Oslo	Planica	Planica							61
2011/12	DQ	8	45	50	DQ	29	43	22	41	q	–	–	–	q	26	49	37	39	29	50	–	–	q	20	–	–							61
2012/13	Lillehammer	Lillehammer	Kuusamo	Krasnaja Polana	Krasnaja Polana	Engelberg	Engelberg	Oberstdorf	Garmisch-Partenkirchen	Innsbruck	Bischofshofen	Wisła	Zakopane	Sapporo	Sapporo	Vikersund	Vikersund	Harrachov	Harrachov	Klingenthal	Oberstdorf	Lahti	Kuopio	Trondheim	Oslo	Planica	Planica						183
2012/13	40	19	29	15	29	10	41	42	17	16	22	29	19	42	11	–	–	–	–	27	12	q	23	q	47	16	–						183
2013/14	Klingenthal	Kuusamo	Lillehammer	Lillehammer	Titisee-Neustadt	Titisee-Neustadt	Engelberg	Engelberg	Oberstdorf	Garmisch-Partenkirchen	Innsbruck	Bischofshofen	Tauplitz	Tauplitz	Wisła	Zakopane	Sapporo	Sapporo	Willingen	Willingen	Falun	Lahti	Lahti	Kuopio	Trondheim	Oslo	Planica	Planica					0
2013/14	q	q	50	q	q	–	–	–	–	–	–	–	–	–	37	q	–	–	q	45	q	q	50	q	q	q	q	q					0
2014/15	Klingenthal	Kuusamo	Kuusamo	Lillehammer	Lillehammer	Nizhny Tagil	Nizhny Tagil	Engelberg	Engelberg	Oberstdorf	Garmisch-Partenkirchen	Innsbruck	Bischofshofen	Tauplitz	Wisła	Zakopane	Sapporo	Sapporo	Willingen	Willingen	Titisee-Neustadt	Titisee-Neustadt	Vikersund	Vikersund	Lahti	Kuopio	Trondheim	Oslo	Oslo	Planica	Planica		11
2014/15	–	–	–	27	32	–	–	q	51	q	45	48	q	–	32	41	–	–	41	45	49	44	35	DQ	24	51	45	43	31	39	–		11
2015/16	Klingenthal	Lillehammer	Lillehammer	Nizhny Tagil	Nizhny Tagil	Engelberg	Engelberg	Oberstdorf	Garmisch-Partenkirchen	Innsbruck	Bischofshofen	Willingen	Zakopane	Sapporo	Sapporo	Oslo	Trondheim	Vikersund	Vikersund	Lahti	Lahti	Kuopio	Almaty	Almaty	Wisła	Titisee-Neustadt	Planica	Planica	Planica				6
2015/16	q	25	q	–	–	q	44	q	46	42	47	–	q	q	q	–	–	–	–	–	–	48	–	–	q	q	–	–	–				6
2016/17	Kuusamo	Kuusamo	Klingenthal	Lillehammer	Lillehammer	Engelberg	Engelberg	Oberstdorf	Garmisch-Partenkirchen	Innsbruck	Bischofshofen	Wisła	Wisła	Zakopane	Willingen	Oberstdorf	Oberstdorf	Sapporo	Sapporo	Pyeongchang	Pyeongchang	Oslo	Trondheim	Vikersund	Planica	Planica							0
2016/17	q	–	q	qq	q	q	50	45	q	q	49	q	q	q	–	–	–	q	47	q	q	–	–	–	–	–							0
2017/18	Wisła	Kuusamo	Nizhny Tagil	Nizhny Tagil	Titisee-Neustadt	Engelberg	Engelberg	Oberstdorf	Garmisch-Partenkirchen	Innsbruck	Bischofshofen	Tauplitz	Zakopane	Willingen	Willingen	Lahti	Oslo	Lillehammer	Trondheim	Vikersund	Planica	Planica											15
2017/18	q	–	39	36	q	43	37	q	42	q	q	26	34	–	–	31	32	38	21	32	q	–											15
2018/19	Wisła	Kuusamo	Kuusamo	Nizhny Tagil	Nizhny Tagil	Engelberg	Engelberg	Oberstdorf	Garmisch-Partenkirchen	Innsbruck	Bischofshofen	Val di Fiemme	Val di Fiemme	Zakopane	Sapporo	Sapporo	Oberstdorf	Oberstdorf	Oberstdorf	Lahti	Willingen	Willingen	Oslo	Lillehammer	Trondheim	Vikersund	Planica	Planica					134
2018/19	47	6	48	15	15	19	26	23	25	27	28	28	27	31	–	–	q	39	q	18	–	–	34	q	q	q	q	27					134
2019/20	Wisła	Kuusamo	Nizhny Tagil	Nizhny Tagil	Klingenthal	Engelberg	Engelberg	Oberstdorf	Garmisch-Partenkirchen	Innsbruck	Bischofshofen	Val di Fiemme	Val di Fiemme	Titisee-Neustadt	Titisee-Neustadt	Zakopane	Sapporo	Sapporo	Willingen	Tauplitz	Tauplitz	Râșnov	Râșnov	Lahti	Lahti	Lillehammer	Trondheim						48
2019/20	32	44	30	q	44	44	27	48	q	q	q	33	42	36	22	25	–	–	16	32	27	22	36	38	39	31	46						48
2020/21	Wisła	Ruka	Ruka	Nizhny Tagil	Nizhny Tagil	Engelberg	Engelberg	Oberstdorf	Garmisch-Partenkirchen	Innsbruck	Bischofshofen	Titisee-Neustadt	Titisee-Neustadt	Zakopane	Lahti	Willingen	Willingen	Klingenthal	Klingenthal	Szczyrk	Szczyrk	Râșnov	Planica	Planica	Planica								19
2020/21	46	37	–	–	–	–	–	29	31	46	44	30	40	q	–	25	44	34	31	44	44	21	q	46	–								19
2021/22	Nizhny Tagil	Nizhny Tagil	Ruka	Ruka	Wisła	Klingenthal	Klingenthal	Engelberg	Engelberg	Oberstdorf	Garmisch-Partenkirchen	Bischofshofen	Bischofshofen	Bischofshofen	Zakopane	Titisee-Neustadt	Titisee-Neustadt	Willingen	Willingen	Lahti	Lahti	Lillehammer	Oslo	Oslo	Oberstdorf	Oberstdorf	Planica	Planica					35
2021/22	38	25	45	40	q	46	43	35	q	49	33	36	12	24	44	–	–	–	–	37	35	q	43	45	q	40	q	–					35
2022/23	Wisła	Wisła	Ruka	Ruka	Titisee-Neustadt	Titisee-Neustadt	Engelberg	Engelberg	Oberstdorf	Garmisch-Partenkirchen	Innsbruck	Bischofshofen	Zakopane	Sapporo	Sapporo	Sapporo	Bad Mitterndorf	Bad Mitterndorf	Willingen	Willingen	Lake Placid, New York	Lake Placid, New York	Râșnov	Oslo	Oslo	Lillehammer	Lillehammer	Vikersund	Vikersund	Lahti	Planica	Planica	63
2022/23	45	21	26	30	30	19	41	29	21	49	23	q	38	39	29	38	–	–	42	q	46	31	19	q	32	36	34	–	–	–	–	–	63
2023/24	Ruka	Ruka	Lillehammer	Lillehammer	Klingenthal	Klingenthal	Engelberg	Engelberg	Oberstdorf	Garmisch-Partenkirchen	Innsbruck	Bischofshofen	Wisła	Zakopane	Willingen	Willingen	Lake Placid, New York	Lake Placid, New York	Sapporo	Sapporo	Oberstdorf	Oberstdorf	Lahti	Lahti	Oslo	Oslo	Trondheim	Trondheim	Vikersund	Vikersund	Planica	Planica	93
2023/24	30	17	14	18	35	43	23	45	40	q	33	–	DQ	34	21	34	46	36	43	22	–	–	31	18	40	24	38	49	–	–	–	–	93
2024/25	Lillehammer	Lillehammer	Ruka	Ruka	Wisła	Wisła	Titisee-Neustadt	Titisee-Neustadt	Engelberg	Engelberg	Oberstdorf	Garmisch-Partenkirchen	Innsbruck	Bischofshofen	Zakopane	Oberstdorf	Oberstdorf	Willingen	Willingen	Lake Placid	Lake Placid	Sapporo	Sapporo	Oslo	Vikersund	Vikersund	Lahti	Planica	Planica				165
2024/25	31	29	23	28	27	29	29	34	8	26	27	26	42	27	10	21	36	35	28	–	–	–	–	16	33	33	10	25	23				165
2025/26	Lillehammer	Lillehammer	Falun	Falun	Ruka	Wisła	Wisła	Klingenthal	Klingenthal	Engelberg	Engelberg	Oberstdorf	Garmisch-Partenkirchen	Innsbruck	Bischofshofen	Zakopane	Sapporo	Sapporo	Willingen	Willingen	Bad Mitterndorf	Bad Mitterndorf	Lahti	Lahti	Oslo	Oslo	Vikersund	Planica	Planica				415
2025/26	12	24	9	24	4	11	6	15	14	33	q	18	14	23	14	14	–	–	8	11	25	q	3	34	41	47	32	q	26				415
