= Alice (restaurant) =

Former restaurant in Ottawa, Ontario, Canada

Coordinates: 45.3991°N 75.7065°W

- Interactive map of Alice

Restaurant information
- Established: June 1, 2019
- Closed: February 4, 2024
- Owner: Briana Kim
- Head chef: Briana Kim
- Food type: Vegetarian
- Location: 40 Adeline St., Ottawa, Ontario, Canada

Alice is a former vegetarian restaurant located in the Centretown West neighbourhood of Ottawa, Ontario.

== History ==
Alice was opened in June 2019 by chef-owner Briana Kim succeeding her previous venture, Cafe My House, a casual dining restaurant that was located in Ottawa's Hintonburg neighbourhood. At opening, Kim envisioned Alice as being "small and intimate...[giving] a sense of discovery when customers are visiting the restaurant."

The business' name, Alice, was inspired from the popular children's book Alice in Wonderland.

The business closed in February 2024, with Kim citing that she was looking to 'evolve' her cooking by opening a new restaurant concept further focused on fermentation.

== Concept ==
The restaurant was fully plant-based, serving an eight course tasting menu alongside natural wines and cocktails. In the fall prior to opening Alice, Kim spent some time working at New York City's three Michelin-starred vegan restaurant Eleven Madison Park, helping draw inspiration for her own restaurant.

Many of the restaurant's dishes incorporated fermented ingredients, with miso pastes, vinegars, and other house-made ferments prominently displayed in glass jars within the dining room. During its operation, the restaurant's menu changed roughly every six weeks. In addition, Kim also foraged for many of the restaurant ingredients in forested areas around Ottawa, including items such as pinecones, spruce tips and mushrooms.

It also offered guests the option of wine and cocktail pairings, with some items, such as the restaurant's vermouth, also made and fermented in-house. Kim learned how to prepare mixed drinks following time training at a non-alcoholic beverage company and alcoholic distillery in Denmark.

== Recognition ==
Ottawa Citizen restaurant critic Peter Hum praised the restaurant for its "refined" and "visually stunning" approach to plant-based cuisine, particularly its extensive use of fermentation. He highlighted the dining experience as showcasing Kim’s technical skill and creativity through dishes like fermented rice “butter” candles, intricately plated salads, and umami-rich eggplant preparations. Hum lauded Alice as a groundbreaking addition to Ottawa’s dining scene, positioning Kim as a chef of national significance.

In 2023, while serving as head chef at Alice, Kim won the Canadian Culinary Championships, an annual competition in which chefs from across Canada compete by presenting dishes evaluated by a panel of restaurant critics. Kim was unanimously selected as the winner by the judging panel and also received the People's Choice Award, determined by votes from non-judge attendees.

=== Canada's 100 Best Restaurants Ranking ===
While in business, Alice consistently made Canada's 100 Best Restaurants list, reaching its peak of #31 in its final year of operation. It was also the highest ranked restaurant in Ottawa on the list that year. According to the publisher of the list, the restaurant would have been placed at #20 in Canada in its 2024 ranking if it did not close a few weeks prior to its reveal.

Alice
Year	Rank	Change
2020	94	new
2021	No List	
2022	50	▲44
2023	31	▲19
2024	CLOSED	
