= Dimitrios Varis =

Greek revolutionary and member of the Filiki Eteria

Dimitrios Varis (Greek: Δημήτριος Βάρης, ?–1821) was a Greek revolutionary and member of the Filiki Eteria.

== Biography ==
He was born in Sozopol in the late 19th century. During the Constantinople massacre of 1821, he with his brother, metropolitan of Sozopol Paisios Prikaios, organised a revolt and cooperating with the Bulgarian voivode Antonov they managed to concentrate some thousands participants. The revolt, which took place in April 1821 failed, as the battles against the Ottomans between Ahtopol and Sozopol were unsuccessful, resulting in Varis getting killed in action and the massacre of some inhabitants of the region, including the Greek kodjabashi Chatzi-Aslanis and the priest Antonakis Skouloglou.
