= Bayrakli Mosque, Samokov =

Mosque in Samokov, Bulgaria

Bayrakli Mosque
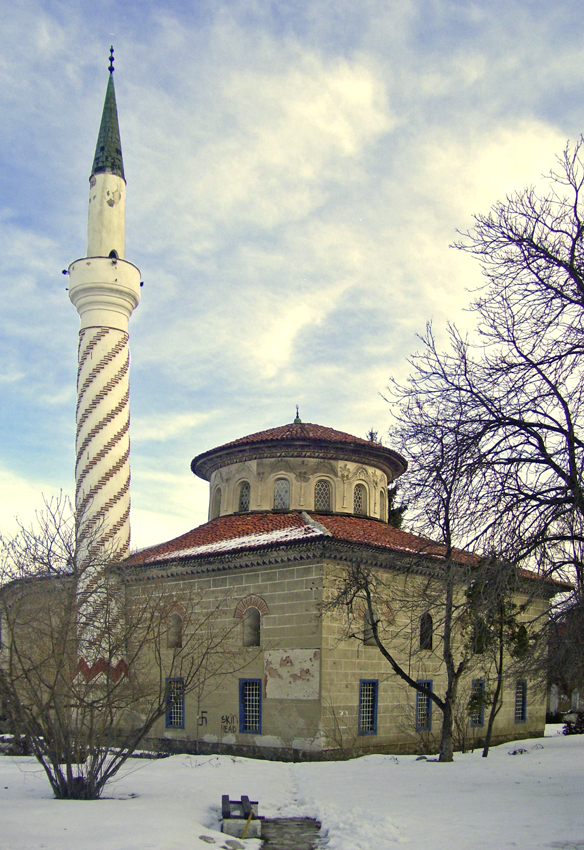

- Location within Bulgaria

Religion
- Affiliation: Islam (former)
- Status: Museum

Location
- Location: Samokov
- Country: Bulgaria
- Interactive map of Bayrakli Mosque
- Coordinates: 42°20′19″N 23°33′29″E

Architecture
- Type: Mosque
- Style: Ottoman
- Completed: 1845

Specifications
- Dome: 1
- Minaret: 1

The Bayrakli Mosque (Bulgarian: Байракли джамия, romanized: Bayrakli dzhamiya), also known as Yokush Mosque (Bulgarian: Йокуш джамия, romanized: Yokush dzhamiya), is a former mosque located in Samokov, Bulgaria.

The Ottoman-era mosque was constructed in 1845, and is well-preserved and retaining most of its original structure. The former mosque has been repurposed as a museum.

== Overview ==
The former mosque was built by Koca Hüsrev Mehmed Pasha, who, according to the legend, ordered to erect both a cross and a crescent on the mosque's dome. In 1966, the mosque was extensively restored by Bulgarian architect Nikola Mushanov.

The mosque prayer hall is rectangular (almost square) and measures 14 by 14.5 metres (46 by 48 ft). The women's prayer area is located on the balcony. The dome is built on four wooden columns. Frescoes with floral motives were painted over in the 19th century and uncovered during the restoration in 1966. There is one tall minaret next to the building. Unusually, the interior of the former mosque is lavishly decorated with floral motifs by local, non-Muslim folk artists such as Ivan Ikonopisets, Hristo Yovevich, and Kosta Valyov.

== Decoration ==
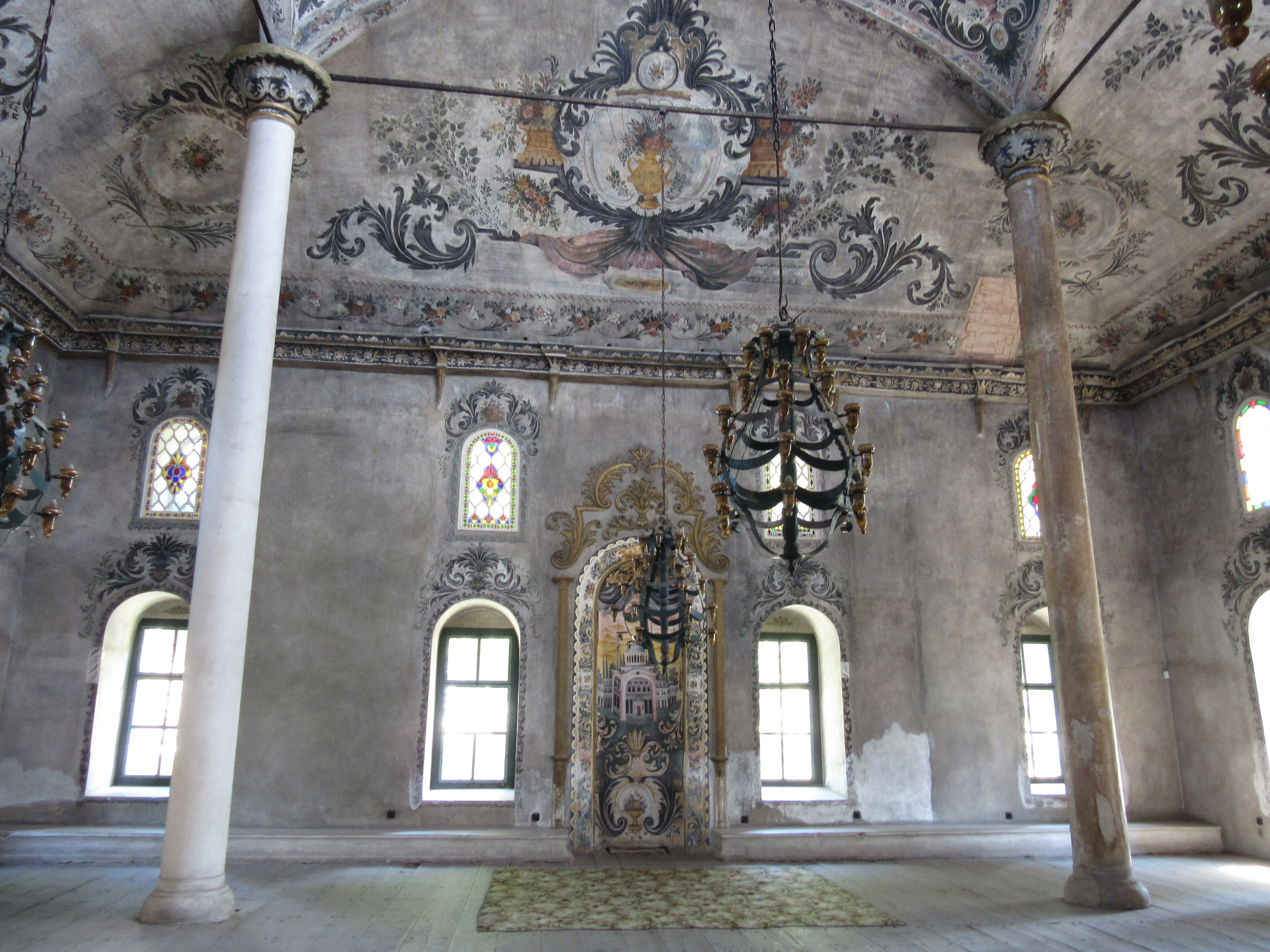
Interior of the prayer hall

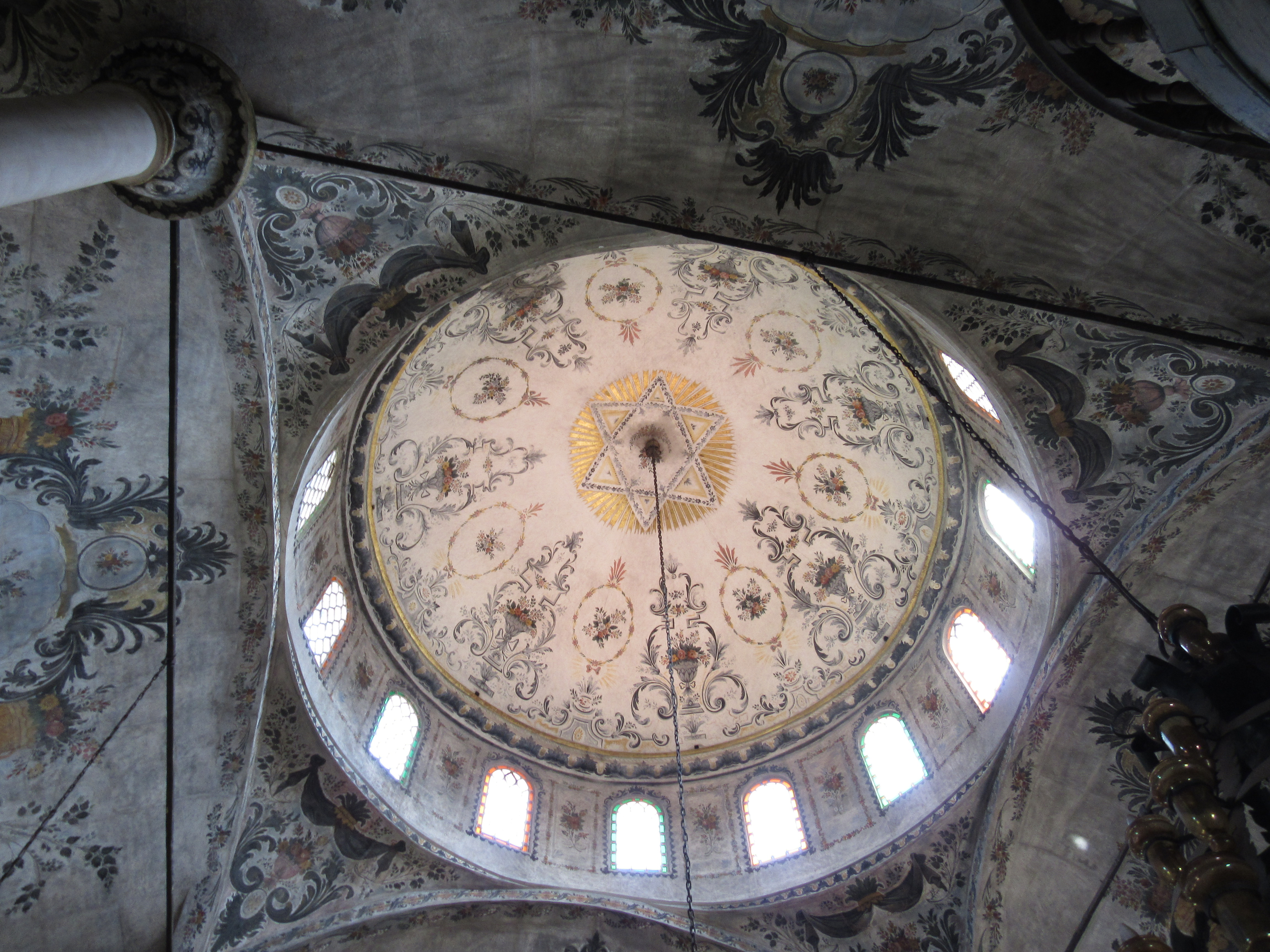
Dome decoration
