= Emil Zografski =

Bulgarian ski jumper

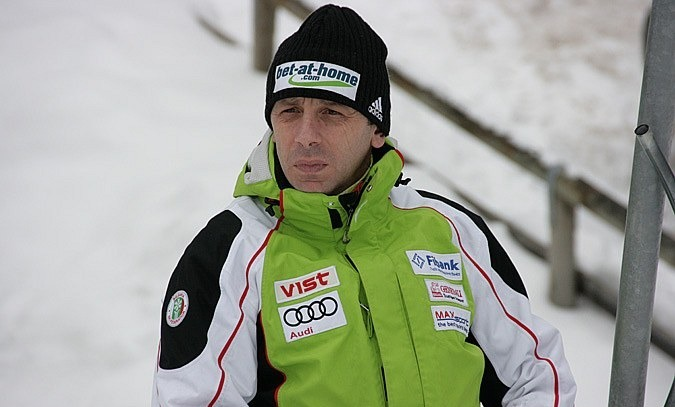
Emil Zografski

Emil Zografski (Bulgarian: Емил Зографски) (born 3 February 1968 in Sofia, Bulgaria) is a retired Bulgarian ski jumper. He competed at the 1988 Winter Olympics in Calgary, Alberta, Canada, and at the 1992 Winter Olympics in Albertville, France. He is the father of Vladîmir Zografski.
