= Mary M. Haskell =

American congregationalist missionary

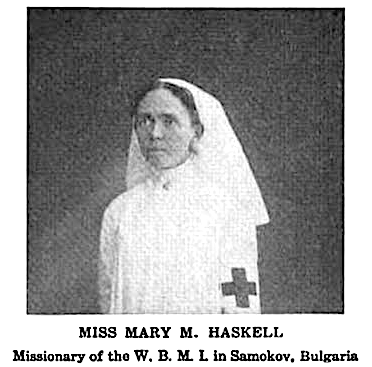
Haskell, in a 1913 publication

Mary Minerva Haskell (May 18, 1869 – December 6, 1953) was an American congregationalist missionary in Bulgaria.

== Early life ==
Mary Minerva Haskell was born at Filibe, Edirne Vilayet, Ottoman Empire (now Plovdiv) in 1869 to missionary parents Henry Charles Haskell (1835–1914) and Margaret Bell Haskell (1841–1924). She attended Oberlin College, graduating in the class of 1889.

== Career ==
Haskell moved back to Bulgaria as a teacher in 1890. In 1901 she worked with refugees from the Macedonian Revolution, and played a minor role in the Miss Stone Affair. In 1908 she was assigned to the Monastir Orphanage at Samokov, under the auspices of the Women's Board of Missions of the Interior (WBMI). She was arrested and imprisoned during the Balkan Wars (1912–1913) and received the Cross of Queen Eleonore for her service as a nurse. She stayed in Bulgaria through World War II. Haskell left Sofia for the last time in 1950, forced to leave when the United States ended diplomatic relations with Bulgaria.

During visits home to the United States, she attended conferences and gave lectures about Bulgaria. In 1918 she published a pamphlet, "Glimpses of Bulgaria During the Present Crisis", to raise money for the orphanage she served. Haskell spoke at the meeting of the Congregational Women's Missionary Society of Southern California, held in San Diego in 1932.

== Personal life ==
Mary Minerva Haskell died in 1953, aged 84 years, in California. Her brother, Henry J. Haskell (1874–1952), was a newspaper editor in Kansas City, who married Katharine Wright, sister of the Wright Brothers, in 1926.

Among her notable nephews were Edward Haskell, an independent researcher of "unified science", and Douglas Haskell, an architecture critic and magazine editor.
