= Antheia (Thessaly) =

Antheia (Ancient Greek: Ἄνθεια) was a town in ancient Thessaly.
