= Antheia (Thrace) =

Ancient settlement in Thrace

Coordinates: 42°27′N 27°35′E

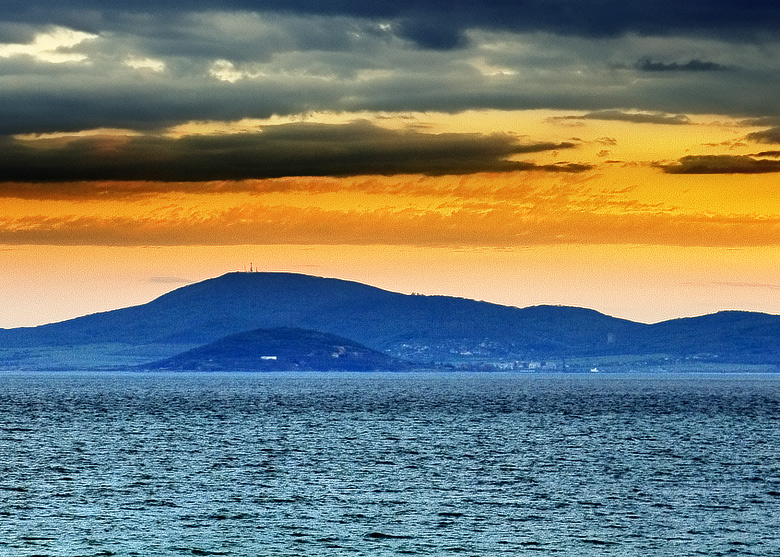
Atia peninsula and the Medni Rid hill behind.

Map of the coast of Bulgaria near Burgas; the site of ancient Antheia is marked

Antheia (Ancient Greek: Ἄνθεια) was a town on the western coast of the Pontus Euxinus (Black Sea) in ancient Thrace, a colony of the Milesians and Phocaeans. It later bore the Latin name Anthium, and was the precursor settlement to Apollonia Pontica (modern Sozopol). It was located on the Gulf of Burgas between the modern cities of Burgas and Sozopol in Bulgaria.

== Situation ==
The settlement was on the coast of the Gulf of Burgas, located on the peninsula of Atia (Bulgarian: Атия), which lies between the bays of Vromos and Atya, about 2 km northwest of the modern town of Chernomorets. About 10 km southeast is Sozopol, the ancient Apollonia, which was the successor settlement to Antheia. Today, the peninsula is occupied by the Atiya Naval Base, thus the site is within a restricted military area. Not far away is the village Atia.

== History ==
In the course of Greek colonization of the Black Sea in the late 7th and early 6th century BCE. The place was founded by Greeks from Miletus and Phocaea. All finds made in the area of settlement originate from Archaic period leading to the conclusion that the place was abandoned early. The place was apparently just an apoikia and never attained the status of polis, and possibly merged with Apollonia by synoikismos. Pliny, writing in the first century, reports that Antheia was located in the area where Apollonia was in his time - Astice regio habuit oppidum Anthium, nunc est Apollonia. The interpretation of this passage, that Antheia was a former name of Apollonia, is based on a misunderstanding.

== Archaeology ==
From Antheia comes the statue of a headless archaic Kouros (c. 550-540 BCE) and archaic ceramics. In 1927 a hoard of arrowheads of the 5th century BCE was found there, which has been interpreted as showing that arrowheads were a form of pre-monetary medium of exchange. In the Middle Ages, the Atia peninsula was populated again. On its highest elevation are the sparse remains of a medieval fortress.
