= Antheia (restaurant) =

Restaurant in Ottawa, Ontario, Canada

Coordinates: 45.4089°N 75.7127°W

- Interactive map of Antheia

Restaurant information
- Established: December 5, 2025
- Owner: Briana Kim
- Head chef: Briana Kim
- Food type: Vegetarian
- Location: 861 Somerset St West, Ottawa, Ontario, K1R 6R6, Canada
- Seating capacity: 16
- Reservations: Mandatory

Antheia is a vegetarian fermentation-focused restaurant located in the Centretown West neighbourhood of Ottawa, Ontario, Canada.

== History ==
Antheia was opened in December 2025 by chef-owner Briana Kim, serving as an evolution to her previous vegetarian fine dining restaurant Alice.

Between the closure of Alice and opening of Antheia, Kim spent time working at three-Michelin star retaurant Noma's fermentation laboratory. Kim was offered the opportunity to lead Noma's fermentation program but declined to return to Ottawa to focus on opening Antheia.

The restaurant, named after the Greek goddess of vegetation, provided further space for Kim and her staff to experiment with fermentation based dishes.

== Concept ==
The restaurant serves a 9 course tasting menu, of which all of its dishes are vegetarian and include ingredients that have been fermented in-house within the business's fermentation laboratory. The menu is seasonal and focused on the cycle of fermentation, with summers offering a 'nature' menu, autumns and winters offering a 'preservation' menu, and springs offering an 'innovation' menu.

It offers an optional wine pairing or fermented beverage pairing with the meal, the latter of which is produced by the restaurant within their fermentation laboratory.

The business is located speakeasy-style in a Chinatown alleyway, with no signage indicating its presence from the street front. The majority of the restaurant's seating is at a 12 seat chef's counter facing the open kitchen, with two additional tables in the dining area.

== Recognition ==
Ottawa Citizen restaurant critic Peter Hum lauded the restaurant's dishes as "flawless and fascinating" and the house-made fermented beverage pairing as "refined and interesting".

Montreal-based online food publication Tastet highlighted Antheia's fermentation based menu as a "commitment to sustainability and ingenuity", while calling Kim a "fermentation visionary redefining Canadian cuisine."

In 2026, Antheia was named as a finalist for Air Canada's annual best new restaurants in Canada list.

=== Canada's 100 Best Restaurants Ranking ===
Antheia debuted on Canada's 100 Best Restaurants list in its first year of eligibility in 2026, ranking #76.

Antheia
Year	Rank	Change
2026	76	new

== See also ==
- List of vegetarian and vegan restaurants
