= Sozopol =

Sozopol Созопол
- Resort
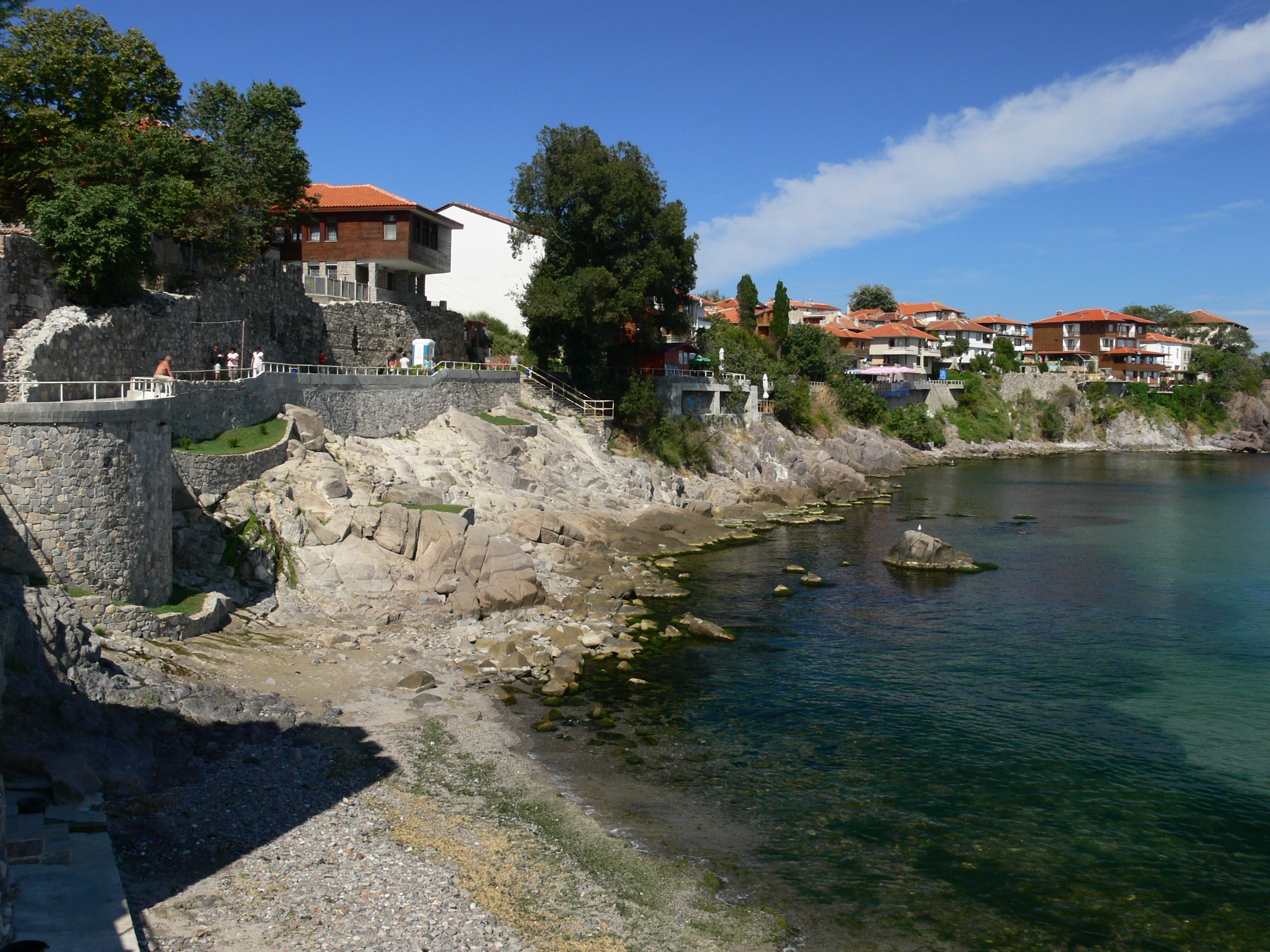

- Coat of arms

- Location of Sozopol
- Coordinates: 42°25′N 27°42′E
- Country: Bulgaria
- Province: Burgas
- Municipality: Sozopol

Government
  - Mayor: Tihomir Yanakiev (BSP)

Area
  - Resort: 21.11 km^{2} (8.15 sq mi)
- Elevation: 0 m (0 ft)

Population (2010)
  - Resort: 5,679
  - Density: 269.0/km^{2} (696.8/sq mi)
  - Urban: 14,789
- Time zone: UTC+2 (EET)
  - Summer (DST): UTC+3 (EEST)
- Postal Code: 8130
- Area code: 0550
- Website: sozopol.bg

Sozopol (Bulgarian: Созопол [soˈzɔpoɫ]; Greek: Σωζόπολις, romanized: Sozopolis; Turkish: سوزەبولى Süzebolu) is an ancient seaside town located 35 km south of Burgas on the southern Bulgarian Black Sea Coast. One of the major seaside resorts in the country, it is known for the Apollonia art and film festival (which takes place in early September) that is named after one of the town's ancient names. Part of Burgas Province and administrative centre of the homonymous Sozopol Municipality, as of December 2009, the town has a population of 5,410 inhabitants.

In antiquity, the place was the site of a prosperous Greek colony named Antheia and later known as Apollonia. In 72 BC it was devastated by a Roman siege, and became a small town of lesser importance. By the first century AD, the name Sozopolis began to appear in written records.

The busiest times of the year are the summer months, ranging from May to September, as tourists from around the world come for the weather, sandy beaches, history and culture, fusion cuisine (Balkan and Mediterranean), and atmosphere of the resort.

== Name ==
The original name of the city is attested as Antheia (Ἄνθεια in Greek) but was soon renamed to Apollonia (Ἀπολλωνία). At various times, Apollonia was known as Apollonia Pontica (Ἀπολλωνία ἡ Ποντική, that is, "Apollonia on the Black Sea", the ancient Pontus Euxinus) and Apollonia Magna ("Great Apollonia"). By the first century AD, the name Sozopolis (Σωζόπολις) began to appear in written records. During the Ottoman rule which began in 1453, the town was known as Sizebolu, Sizeboli or Sizebolou.

== History ==
=== Bronze Age ===
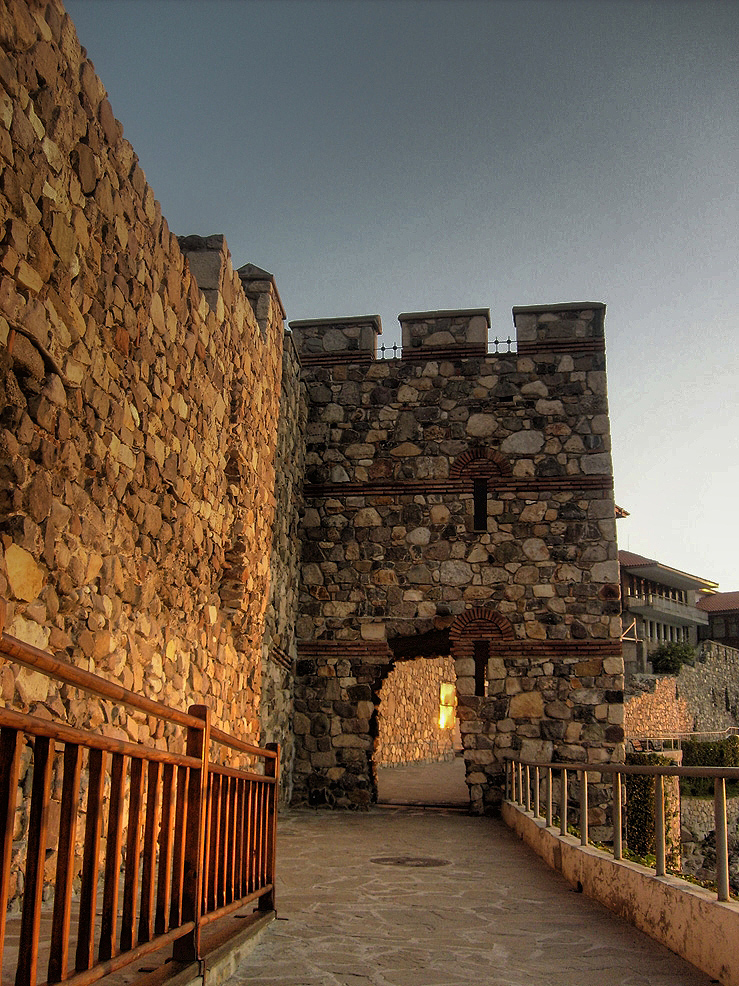
A reconstructed gate part of Sozopol's ancient fortifications

Sozopol is one of the oldest towns on Bulgarian Thrace's Black Sea coast. The first settlement on the site dates back to the Bronze Age. Undersea explorations in the region of the port reveal relics of dwellings, ceramic pottery, stone and bone tools from that era. Many anchors from the second and first millennium BC have been discovered in the town's bay, a proof of active shipping since ancient times.

=== Iron Age ===
The town was founded in the 7th century BC by ancient Greek colonists from Miletus as Antheia (Ancient Greek: Ἄνθεια). The town established itself as a trade and naval centre in the following centuries and became one of the largest and richest Greek colonies in the Black Sea region. Its trade influence in the Thracian territories was based on a treaty dating from the fifth century BC with the Odrysian kingdom, the most powerful Thracian state. The town's name was changed to Apollonia, on account of a temple dedicated to Apollo in the town. Apollonia became a legendary trading rival of another Greek colony, Mesembria, today's Nessebar.

There were two temples of Apollo Iatros (Ancient Greek: Ἀπόλλων Ἰατρός), meaning healer in Greek. One was from the Late Archaic Greece and the other from the Early Classical Greece.

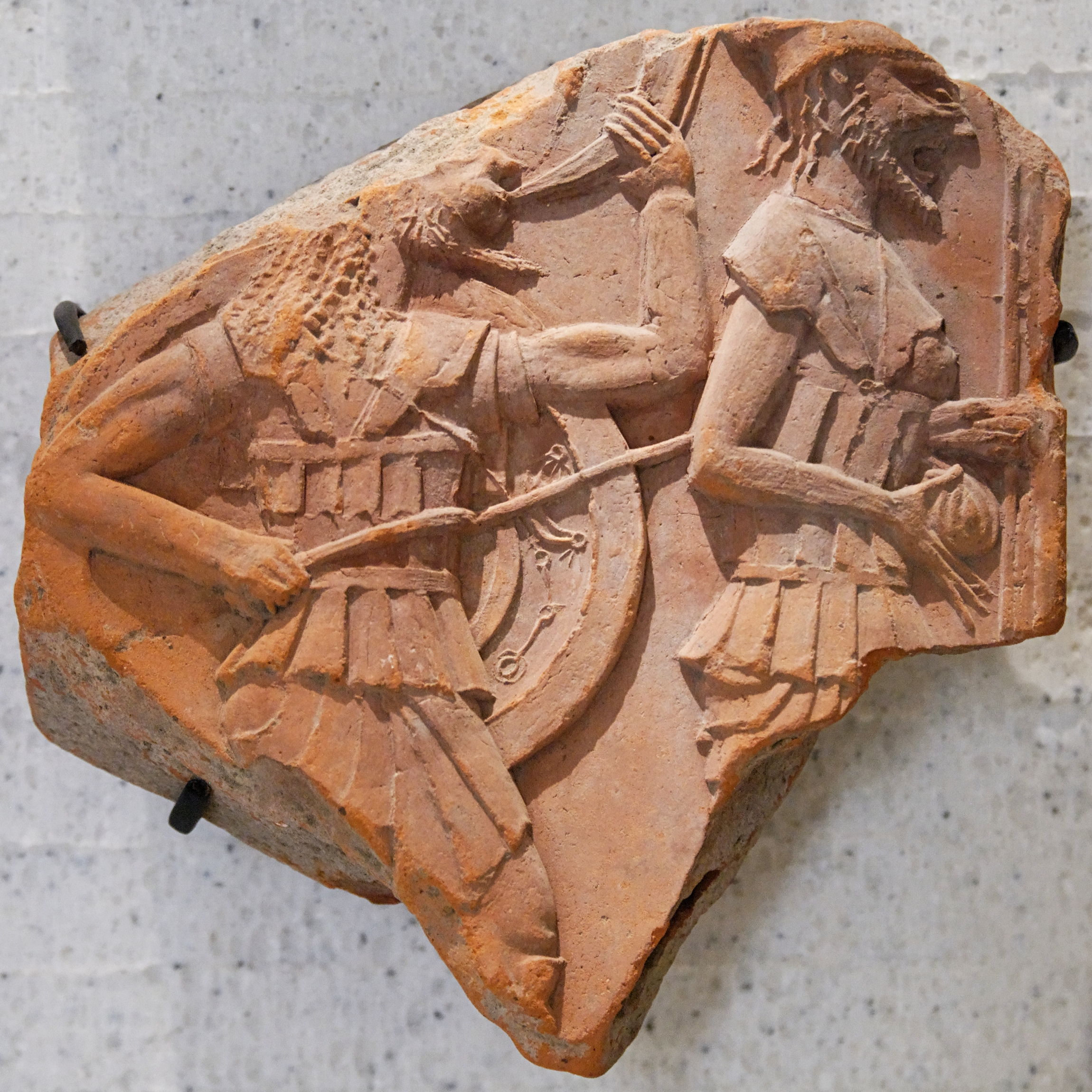
Terracotta plaque of ancient Greek hoplites (Louvre)

It kept strong political and trade relations with the cities of Ancient Greece – Miletus, Athens, Corinth, Heraclea Pontica and the islands Rhodes, Chios, Lesbos, etc.

The city managed to keep its independence during the wars of Philip II of Macedon (342–339 BC) and Alexander the Great (335 BC).

In 72 BC it was conquered and sacked by the Roman legions of Marcus Lucullus, with the latter ordering its devastation. Lucullus transported the statue of Apollo to Rome and placed it in the Capitol. Apollonia did not recover from the disaster, remaining a small town without any significant trade or cultural importance during the Roman period (1st to 3rd centuries AD).

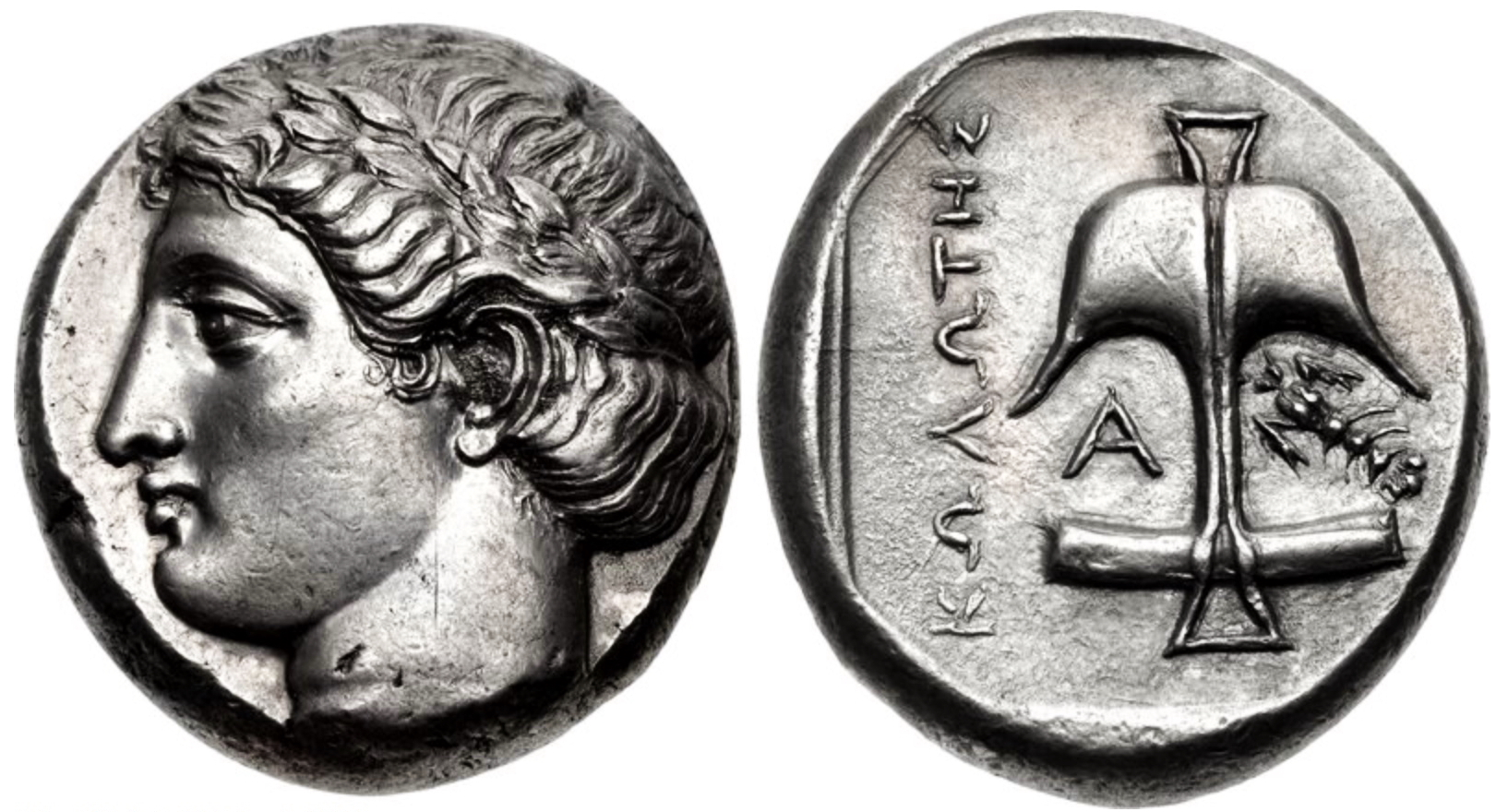
4th century BC Apollonia Pontica tetradrachm showing Apollo and an upright anchor

Apollonia Pontica started minting its own coins at the end of the 6th century BC, the anchor appearing on them as the symbol of the polis present on all coins minted since the sixth century BC, proof of the importance of its maritime trade. Coins from the fourth century BC bear the name Apollonia and the image of Apollo. The Roman imperial coins continue to the first half of the third century AD.

The Tabula Peutinger shows Apollonia; but the "Periplus Ponti Euxini", 85, and the Notitiæ episcopatuum have only the later name Sozopolis.

=== Later periods ===
In 1328 Cantacuzene (ed. Bonn, I, 326) speaks of it as a large and populous town. The islet on which it stood is now connected with the mainland by a narrow tongue of land. Ruled in turn by the Byzantine, Bulgarian and Ottoman Empires, Sozopol was assigned to the newly independent Principality of Bulgaria in the 19th century. A group of Polish Armenians, expelled by the Ottoman occupiers from Kamieniec Podolski in 1674, stayed in the city for a single winter before returning to Poland.

At the outbreak of the Greek War of Independence (1821) prominent local personalities like Dimitrios Varis were arrested and executed by the Ottoman authorities due to participation in the preparations of the struggle.

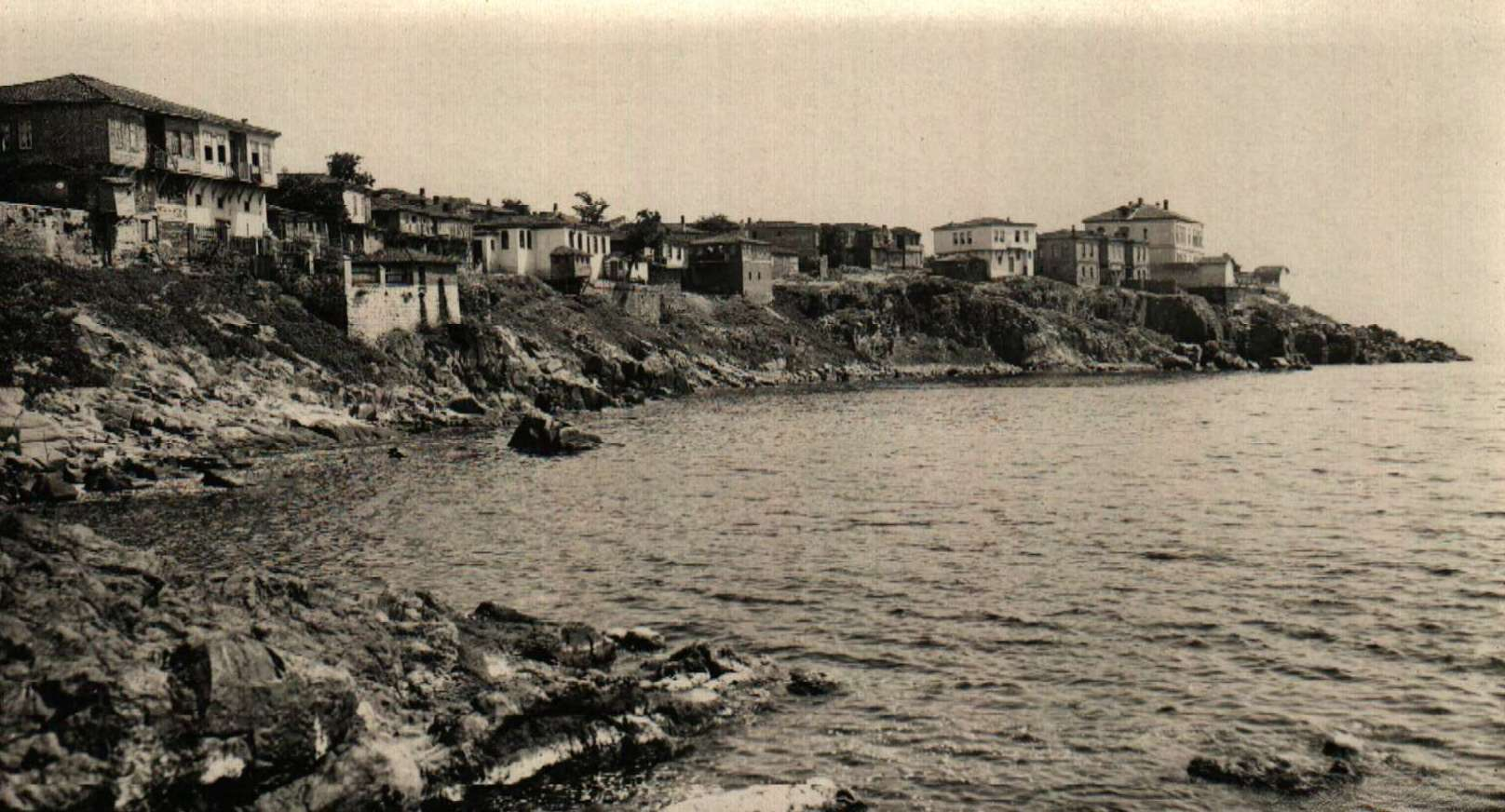
Sozopol in 1931

According to the Bulgarian jurist and politician Vasil Mitakov (1881–1945), the town was almost entirely ethnically Greek in the first decade of the 20th century, with the exception of a few dozen Bulgarians in the whole city who were either current or retired officials. After the anti-Greek pogroms in Bulgaria in 1906, Greek institutions in the city were closed and expropriated, including the churches, the library and the Greek school. Almost all of its remaining Greek population was exchanged with Bulgarians from Eastern Thrace in the aftermath of the Balkan Wars. In the 1920s, the former Greek population then settled in Chalkidiki founding a town also named Sozopolis. In 2011 the remainings of an ancient Greek settlement, part of Apollonia, were excavated in the small island of St. Kirik (Saint Cerycus) off Sozopolis.

Since 1984 Sozopol hosts the Apollonia art festivities every September, which include theatre shows, exhibitions, movies, musical and dance performances, book presentations and other cultural events.

=== Colossal statue of Apollo ===
The city erected, in 5th century BC, a colossal statue of the god Apollo which was 13 m (43 ft) tall. It was created by the sculptor Calamis. In 72 BC, the Romans under Marcus Lucullus captured the city and moved the sculpture to Rome on the Capitolium. Pliny the Elder wrote that the statue cost 500 talents. It was lost during the Early Christian period.

The municipality of Sozopol launched a proposal in 2011 to rebuild the Colossus of Apollo. The proposal was revived in 2016 by the now deceased director of Bulgaria's National Historical Museum in Sofia, Bozhidar Dimitrov (himself a native of Sozopol), with the intention of boosting tourism. The initiative was criticized by the Bulgarian Orthodox Church, with the Metropolitan of Sliven, Yoanikiy (1939-2024), arguing that restoring the statue would resurrect paganism in Sozopol. However, the project has not had any concrete progress materialized to date.

=== Archaeology ===
Recent excavations have revealed parts of the ancient city including:

- A temple complex (late 6th - early 5th century BC) presumably belonging to the famous temple of Apollo;
- An oval altar and a temple from the Hellenistic period (4th century BC);
- A tholos
- A copper foundry

In addition, archaeologists discovered a Greek bucranium amulet from the 5th century BC. A shrine of goddesses Demeter and Persephone from the 6th century BC.

Many objects from antiquity, included imported luxury ceramics, red-figure pottery, sgraffito pottery, pottery lamps, loom weights, spindle parts, coins, amphora seals, arrow coins, ceramic game pieces, adornments. One of the most impressive finds was an Attica red-figure pottery krater, depicting the myth about Oedipus and the Sphinx. The krater is dated to the second quarter of the 5th century BC. Excavation teams also discovered, a ceramic askos dated back to the second half of the 6th century BC, and was "made in the tradition of grey monochrome Aeolian pottery", a 6th-century BC home and other antiquity buildings, pottery and coins from both the antiquity period and the Middle Ages. Furthermore, have also identified the ruins of a medieval Christian chapel and have discovered several graves from a medieval necropolis that was used in two time periods – in the 11th century AD and then again in the 13th – 14th century AD. In a grave from the 11th century, the researchers have found two small crosses – one made of bronze and another one made of bone. They have also discovered three pits hewn into the rocks from the Classical Period of Ancient Greece containing materials from the 5th – 4th century BC.

Later, they discovered an ancient metallurgical plant from the 6th century BC located at an antiquity copper mine. While the ancient copper mining near Sozopol has been well researched, for the first time archaeologists have discovered ceramic kilns for melting the copper ore right on the edge of the mine in what resembles an Antiquity metallurgy facility.

In 2021, archaeologists discovered a terracotta relief fragment, depicting marching Greek hoplites. The relief is a piece of a larger depiction, other parts of which were discovered in 2018 and 2019.

=== Ecclesiastical history ===
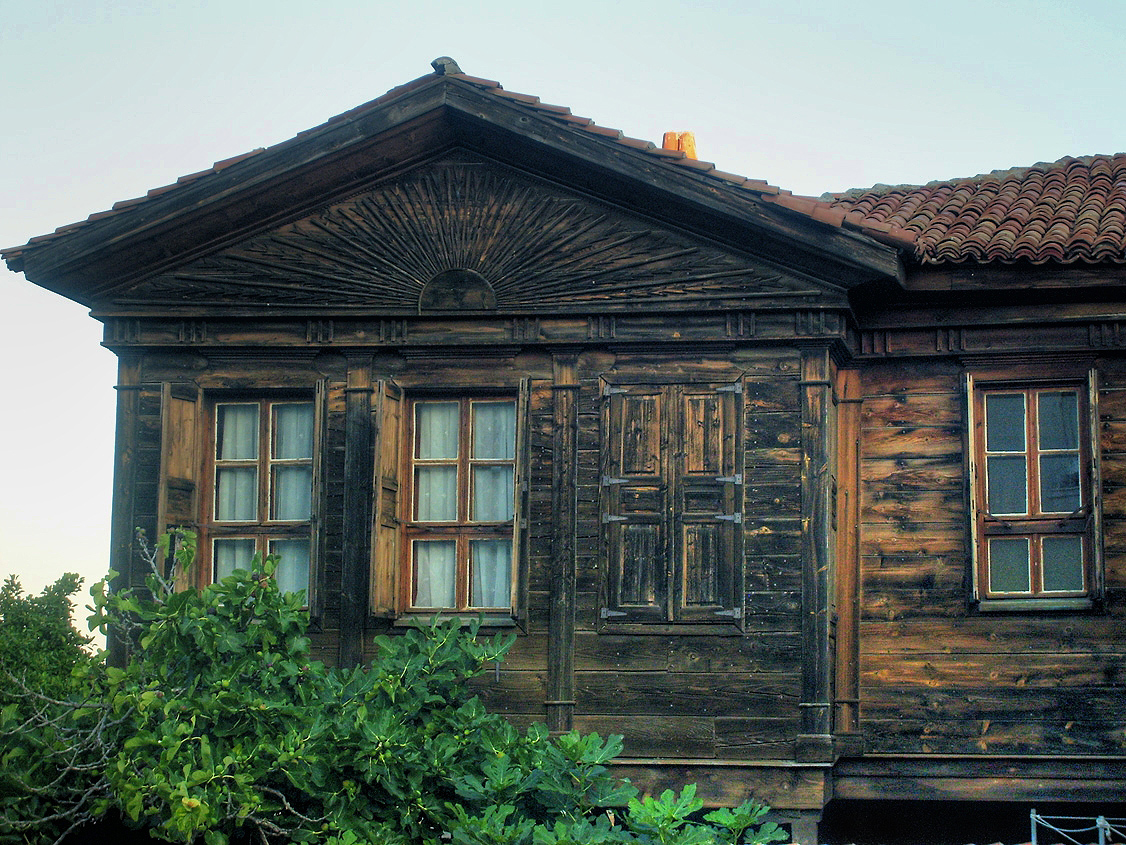
Traditional wooden architecture dominates the Old Town

Sozopol was Christianized early. Bishops are recorded as resident there from at least 431. At least eight bishops are known: Athanasius (431), Peter (680), Euthymius (787) and Ignatius (869); Theodosius (1357), Joannicius, who became Patriarch of Constantinople (1524), Philotheus (1564) and Joasaph (1721).

From being suffragan to the archbishopric of Adrianople, it became in the 14th century a metropolitan see without suffragan sees; it perhaps temporarily disappeared with the Turkish conquest, but reappeared later; in 1808 the Greek Orthodox Church united it to the see of Agathopolis. The titular resided at Agathopolis.

Eubel (Hierarchia catholica medii ævi, I, 194) mentions four Latin bishops of the 14th century.

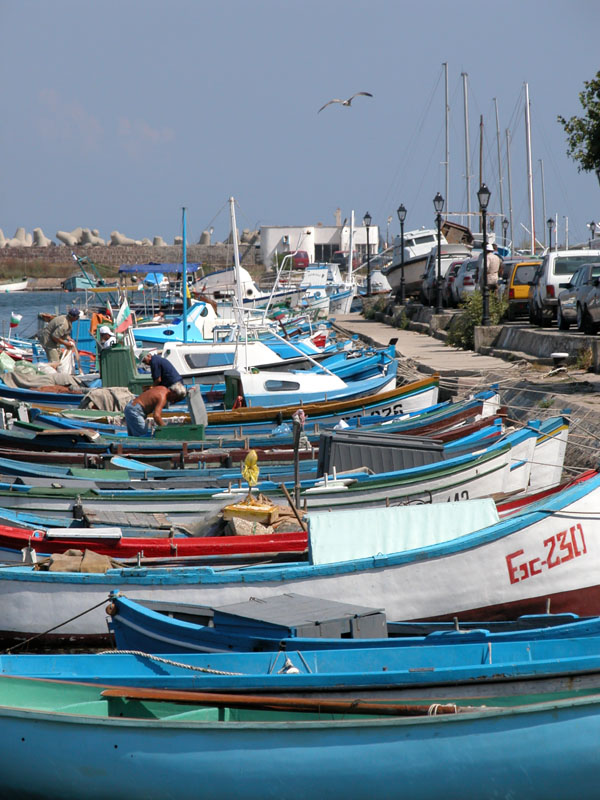
Fishermen's boats in Sozopol

The bishopric is included in the Catholic Church's list of titular sees as Sozopolis in Haemimonto and as a suffragan of Hadrianopolis in Haemimonto.

Art flourished in the Christian era. The icons and woodcarving in the iconostases are an accomplishment of the craftsmanship of these times. The architecture of the houses in the old town from the Renaissance period makes it a unique place to visit today.

=== The vampire of Sozopol ===
During archaeological excavations in 2012 the remains of a skeleton pierced with an iron bar in the heart were found. It is believed that those are the remains of the local nobleman Krivich (or Krivitsa), ruler of the fortress of Sozopol (castrofilax). Believed to be a very cruel person, the locals made sure that he would not come back to haunt the city after his death by piercing him with an iron bar in the chest. There are more than 100 medieval funerals similar to that of Krivitsa found all over Bulgaria. The remains were pierced with either an iron or a wooden bar through the chest to make sure that the dead will not rise from the grave as a vampire.

== Geography ==
=== Climate ===
Climate data for Sozopol (2004-2017)
Month	Jan	Feb	Mar	Apr	May	Jun	Jul	Aug	Sep	Oct	Nov	Dec	Year
Mean daily maximum °C (°F)	8.2 (46.8)	10.2 (50.4)	12.5 (54.5)	17.2 (63.0)	23.5 (74.3)	27.1 (80.8)	29.8 (85.6)	29.7 (85.5)	26.1 (79.0)	21.5 (70.7)	15.5 (59.9)	10.2 (50.4)	19.5 (67.1)
Daily mean °C (°F)	2.7 (36.9)	4.8 (40.6)	8.5 (47.3)	13.5 (56.3)	19.2 (66.6)	23.1 (73.6)	26.3 (79.3)	25.8 (78.4)	21.7 (71.1)	17.2 (63.0)	11.1 (52.0)	6.5 (43.7)	15.5 (59.9)
Mean daily minimum °C (°F)	1.2 (34.2)	2.3 (36.1)	5.7 (42.3)	9.2 (48.6)	14.2 (57.6)	18.1 (64.6)	21.5 (70.7)	21.5 (70.7)	17.1 (62.8)	13.6 (56.5)	7.3 (45.1)	2.8 (37.0)	12.1 (53.8)
Average precipitation mm (inches)	48 (1.9)	43 (1.7)	39 (1.5)	47 (1.9)	47 (1.9)	45 (1.8)	36 (1.4)	28 (1.1)	45 (1.8)	52 (2.0)	73 (2.9)	62 (2.4)	565 (22.2)
Average precipitation days (≥ 1 mm)	11.5	8.3	6.6	4.1	3.7	4.2	2.6	2.8	4.5	7.2	5.0	10.2	70.2
Mean monthly sunshine hours	95	118	171	226	261	302	324	295	245	181	107	76	2,401
Source: weatherbase.com

== Notable natives ==
- Patriarch John XII of Constantinople (in office 1294–1303)
- Giorgios Gounaropoulos (1889–1977), Greek artist
- Dimitrios Varis (?–1821), Greek revolutionary
- Svetoslav Shivarov (born 1944), Bulgarian politician, former Minister of Agriculture and Food Industry
- Bozhidar Dimitrov (1945–2018), Bulgarian historian and politician
- Diogenes of Apollonia (fl. 5th century BC), Ancient Greek philosopher

== Honours ==
Sozopol Gap in Antarctica is named after the city of Sozopol.

== Sport ==
The local football team is called FC Sozopol.

== Gallery ==
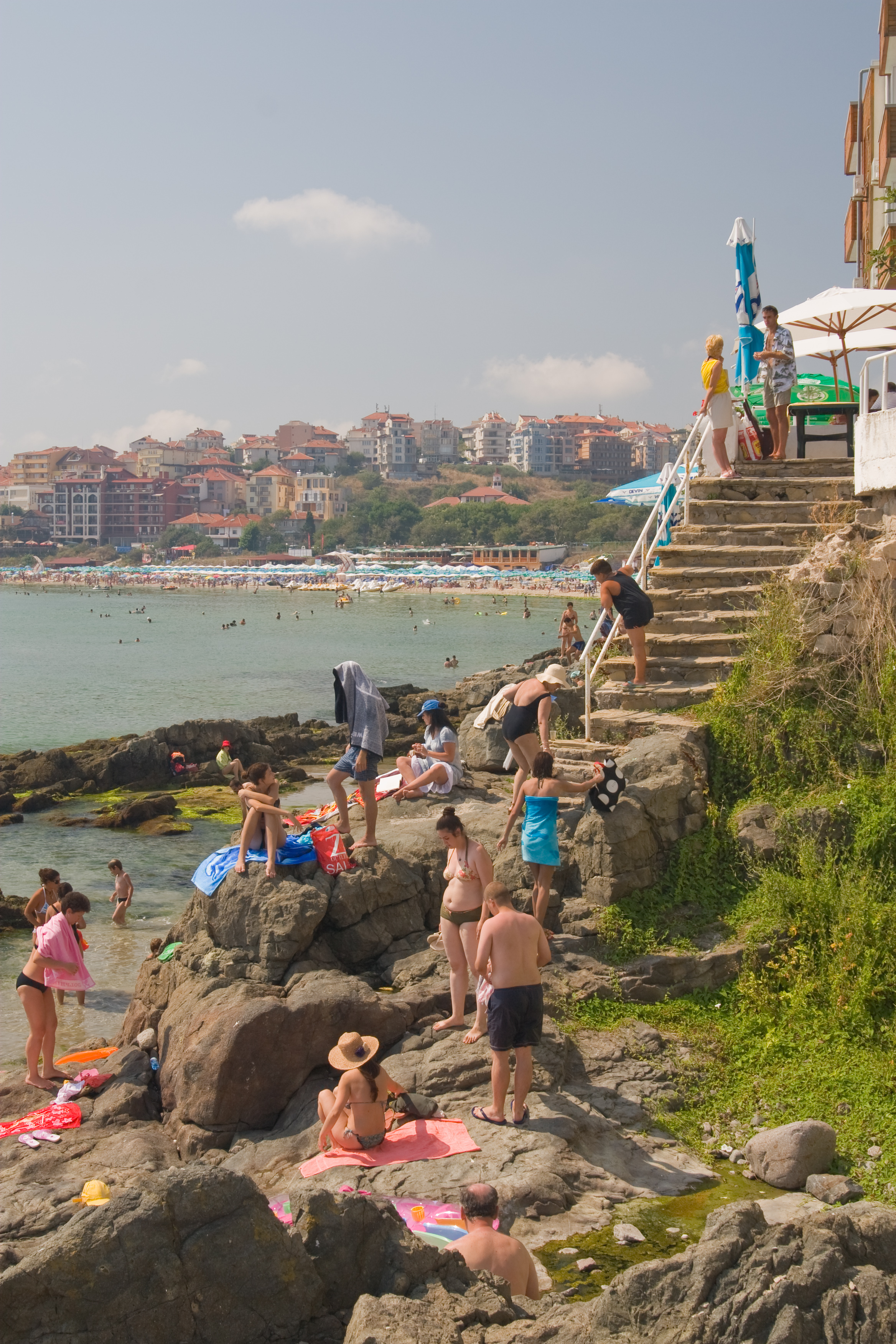
Beach

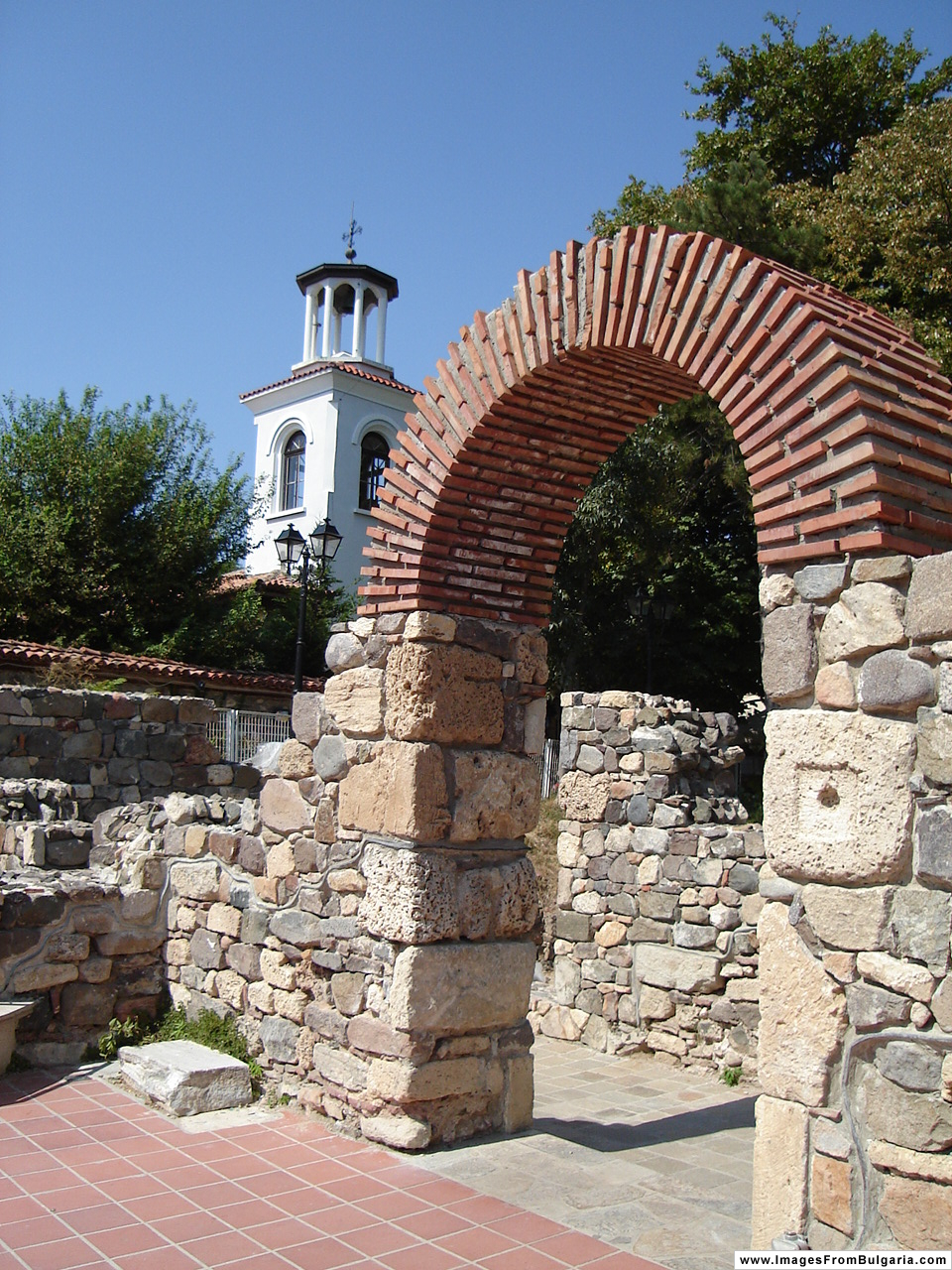
Ancient remains

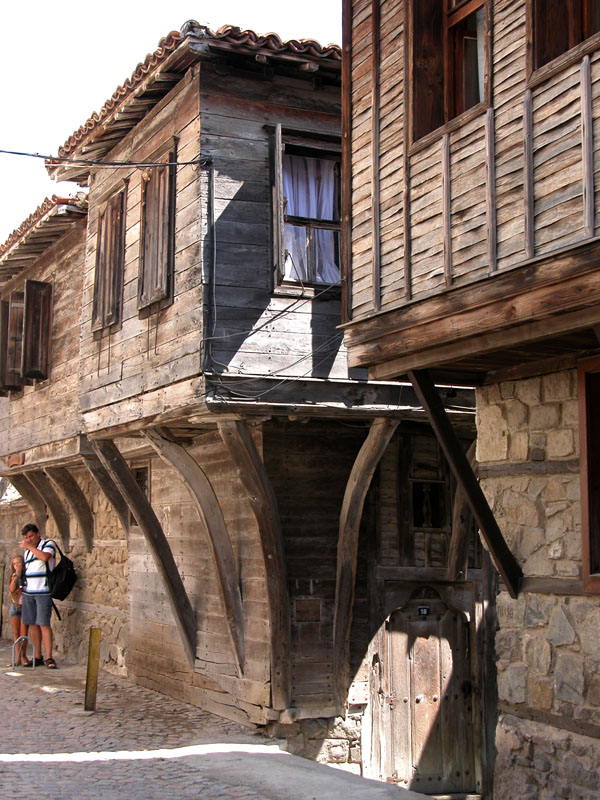
Wooden houses

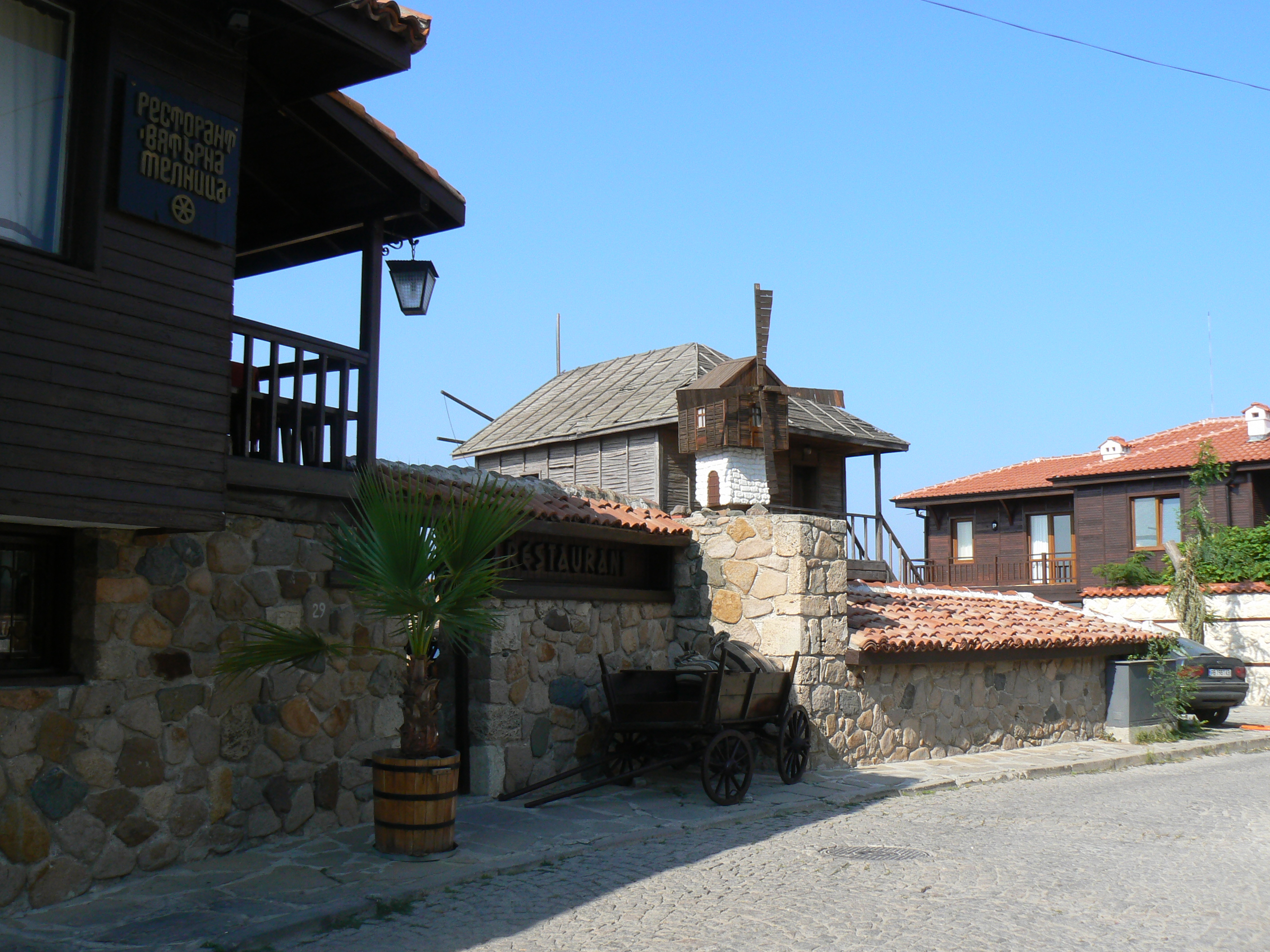
Sozopol old town

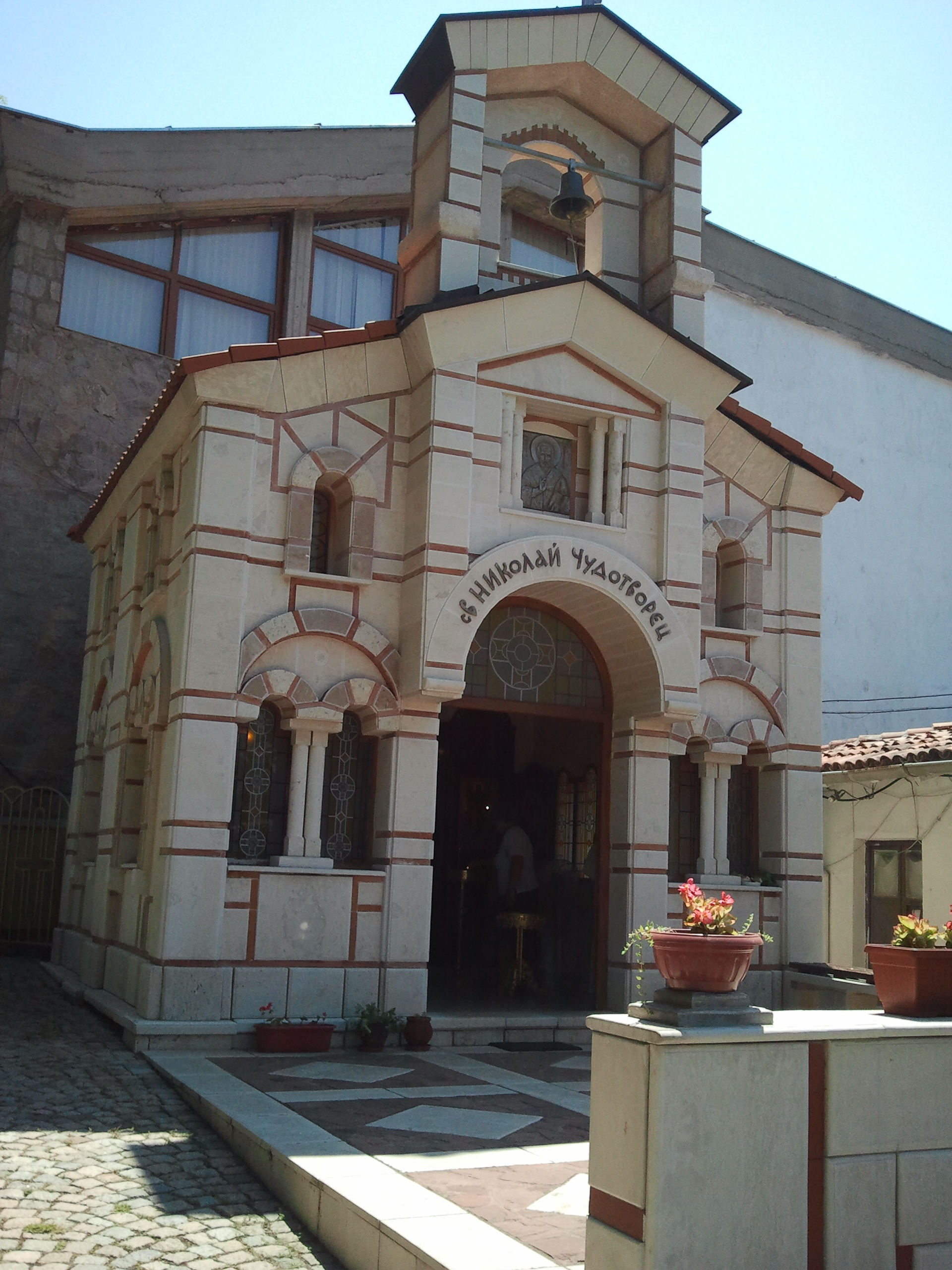
Sozopol old town

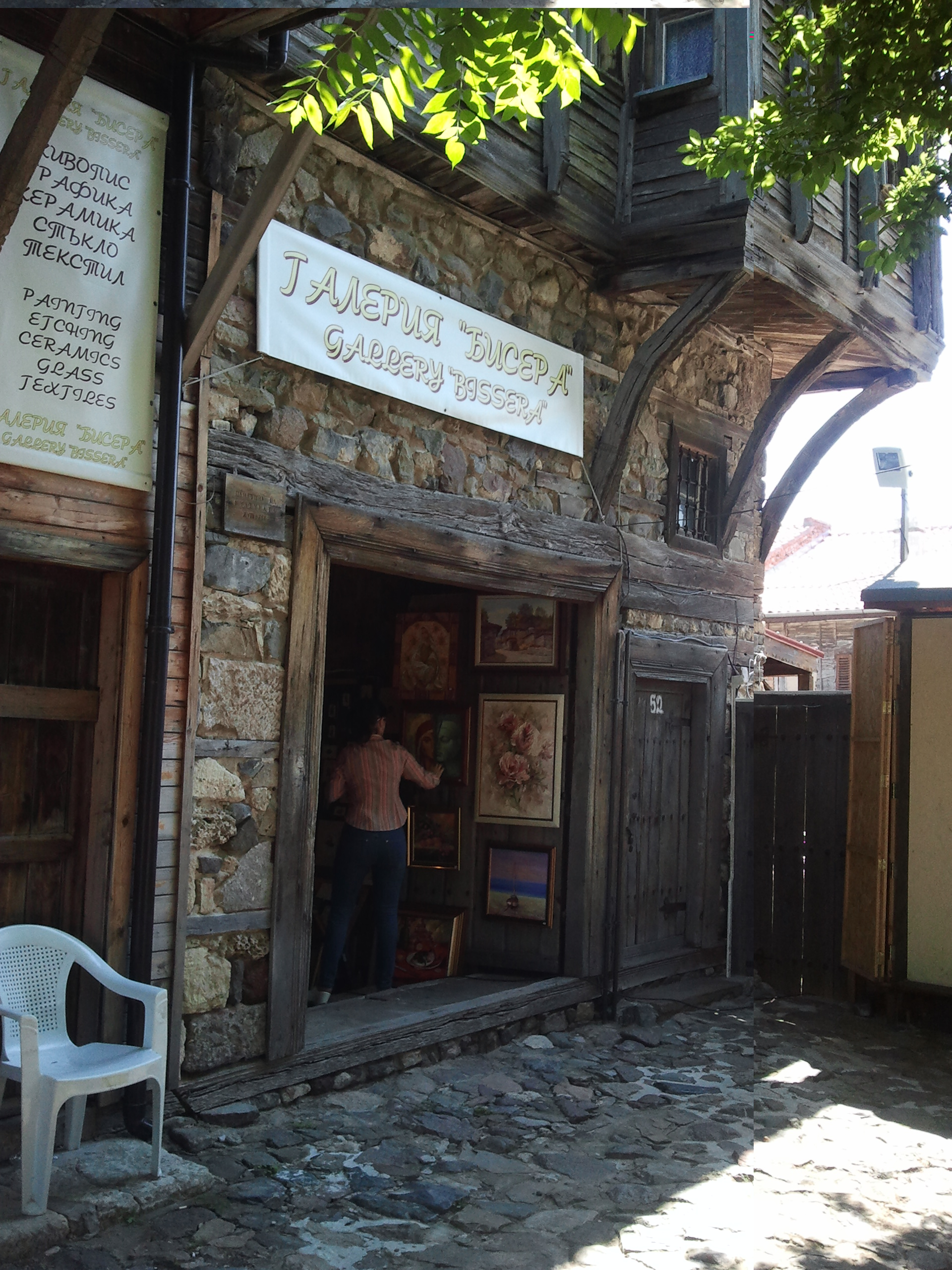
Sozopol old town
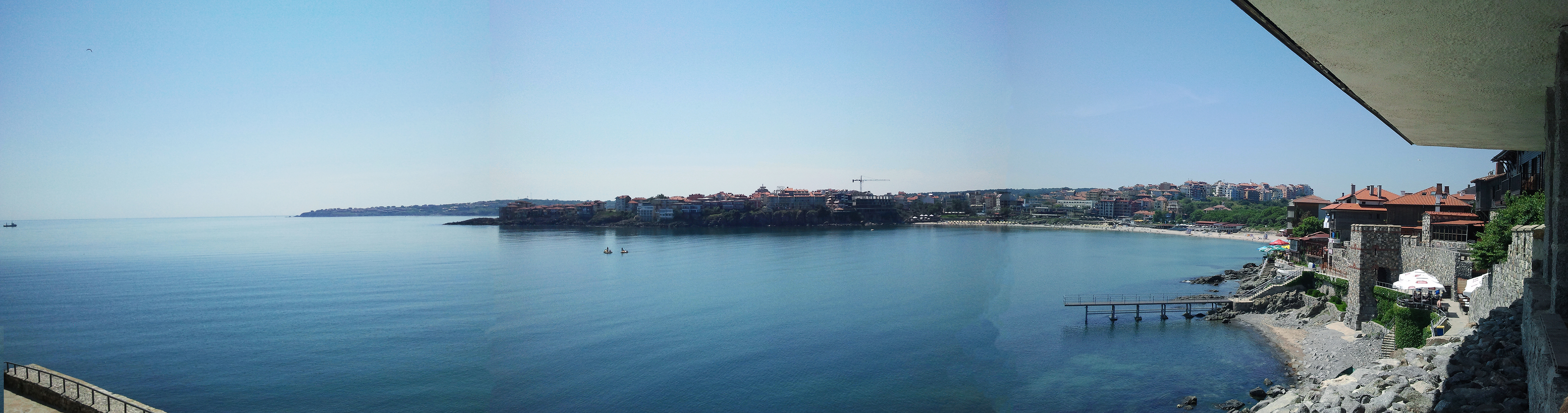
Panorama of Sozopol Beach

== See also ==
- St. Anastasia Island
- St. Cyricus Island
- St. Ivan Island
- St. Thomas Island
