= Samokov =

Samokov Самоков
- Town
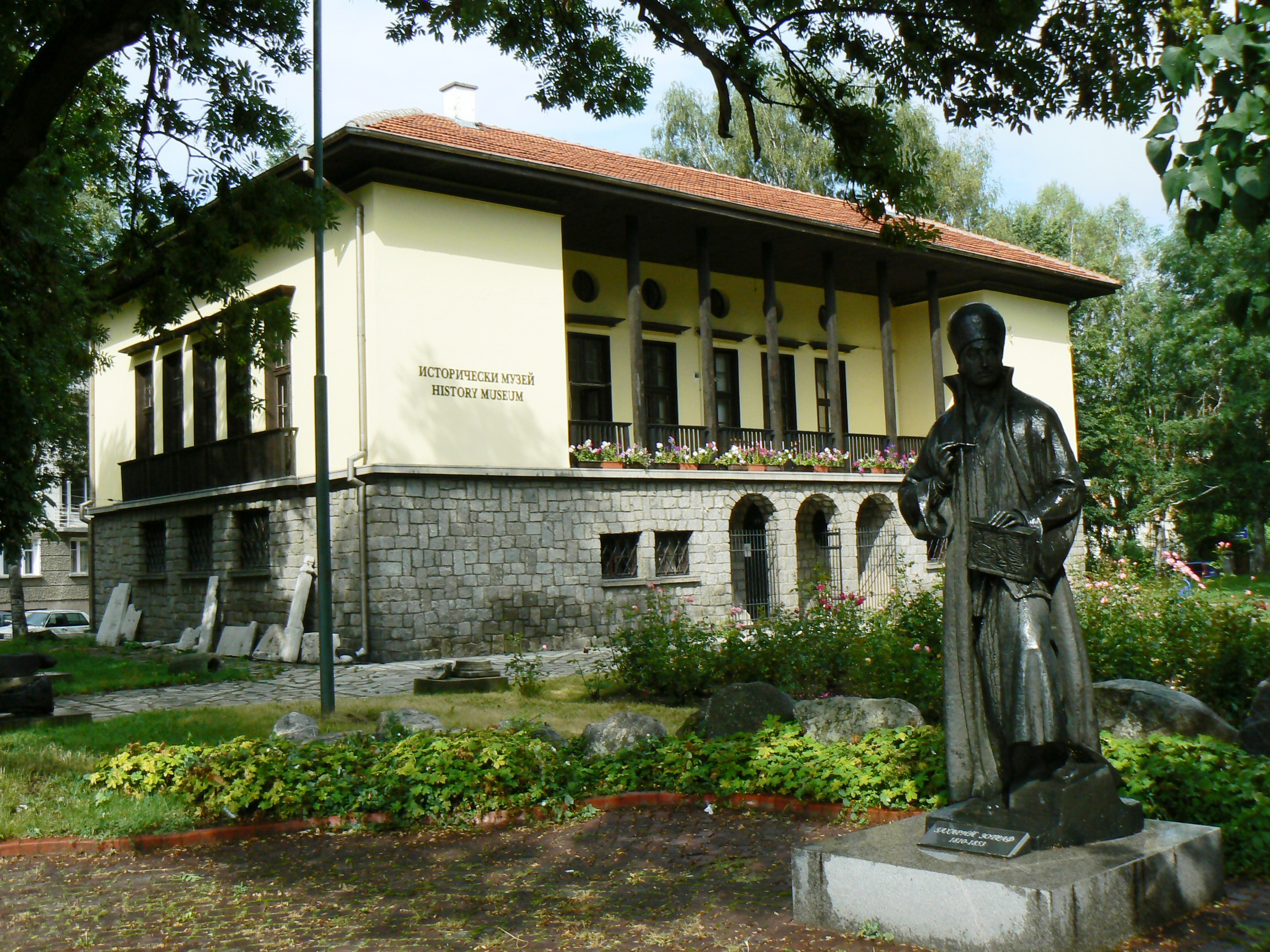
- Samokov Historical Museum with the statue of Zahari Zograf

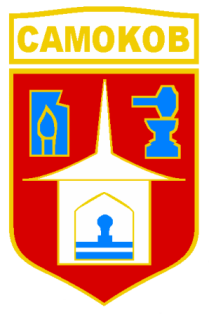
- Coat of arms

- Location of Samokov
- Coordinates: 42°20′N 23°33′E
- Country: Bulgaria
- Province (Oblast): Sofia

Government
  - Mayor: Vladimir Georgiev

Area
  - Town: 11.982 km^{2} (4.626 sq mi)
- Elevation: 950 m (3,120 ft)

Population (2021)
  - Town: 24,629
  - Density: 2,055.5/km^{2} (5,323.7/sq mi)
  - Urban: 35,384
- Time zone: UTC+2 (EET)
  - Summer (DST): UTC+3 (EEST)
- Postal Code: 2000
- Area code: 0722
- Website: http://www.samokov.bg/

Samokov (Bulgarian: Самоков [ˈsamokof]) is a town in Sofia Province in the southwest of Bulgaria. It is in the Samokov Valley between the mountain ranges of Rila, Vitosha, and Sredna Gora, 55 kilometres from the capital Sofia. Due to the suitable winter sports conditions, Samokov, together with the nearby resort Borovets, is a major tourist centre.

In the past, Samokov was a centre of handicrafts and art, with notable Bulgarian National Revival figures like Zahari Zograf, Hristo Dimitrov and Nikola Obrazopisov. The town's name is a compound word of "samo" and "kov", respectively meaning "self" and the root of the verb "forge, hammer", and comes from the samokov, a mechanical forge powered by water, since the town of Samokov was a major iron-producing centre during the Middle Ages.

== History ==
It is thought that Samokov was founded in the 14th century as a mining settlement with the assistance of Saxon miners under the Bulgarian Empire. It was first mentioned in 1455 and in Ottoman registers of 1477 as Vlaychov Samokov. Some of the best craftsmen, woodcarving masters and builders came from Samokov and were recognized for their skills in creating detailed and impressive woodcarvings, painting beautiful icons and building unique architecture.

In fact Samokov was one of the then famous three woodcarving schools in the region, the other two being Debar and Bansko. Their work can be seen in many churches and cultural buildings throughout the Balkan Peninsula. Between the 14th and 18th centuries, Samokov was established as an administrative center for iron ore mining by the ruling Ottoman Empire. From the 16th century until the abolishment of the Serbian Patriarchate of Peć in 1766, Samokov was placed by the Ottomans as the seat of the easternmost eparchy of the Serbian Orthodox Church.

In the 16th and 17th centuries, it grew into the greatest iron extraction centre in the region, with western travellers describing it as 'a fairly large city'. In 1565–1566, Samokov had to produce and deliver to Belgrade 20,000 horseshoes and 30,000 nails. Samokov also produced anchors and other materials for the shipyards of the Bulgarian Black Sea Coast, particularly Pomorie. As the logging industry was also well developed, in 1573 the people of Samokov had to deliver 300 beams as far as Mecca.

== Sports ==
Arena Samokov, a large modern sports arena for basketball, volleyball, boxing, wrestling, judo and more, was opened on 8 March 2008. Its cost is estimated to 16 million lev. There is also a skiing centre in Samokov for cross country skiing, a small alpine hill and a snowboard park. Bulgaria's only ski-jumping hill Chernia kos is located in Samokov. It is a fairly small hill, K-40 metres with a 45-metre jump. The hill is very old and needs to be renovated. The local team is the SK OTP Samokov and the FC Rilski Sportist Samokov.

Lara Racing Circuit is a planned motor FIA and FOM certified racing circuit near Samokov.

== Geography ==
Samokov is situated in Samokov Valley between the mountain ranges of Rila, Vitosha, Plana and Sredna Gora, 55 kilometres from the capital Sofia.

=== Climate ===
Samokov has a humid continental climate (Köppen climate classification Dfb) with an average annual temperature of approximately 9 °C (48 °F). The altitude of 950 metres, in the skirts of Rila mountain, and the mitigating proximity to the continental mediterranean climate zone, are both strong factors in forming the climate.

Summers vary from very warm, sunny and dry to warm and humid, while winter can be relatively mild and wet with much snowfall, but also colder and drier. Spring is often cool and wet, while in autumn there can be numerous sunny, warm days.

Climate data for Samokov, Bulgaria
Month	Jan	Feb	Mar	Apr	May	Jun	Jul	Aug	Sep	Oct	Nov	Dec	Year
Record high °C (°F)	15.7 (60.3)	18.9 (66.0)	27.4 (81.3)	26.4 (79.5)	30.4 (86.7)	32.8 (91.0)	34.4 (93.9)	36.8 (98.2)	34.5 (94.1)	30.1 (86.2)	25.3 (77.5)	19.6 (67.3)	36.8 (98.2)
Mean daily maximum °C (°F)	2.1 (35.8)	4.2 (39.6)	8.7 (47.7)	15.3 (59.5)	20.1 (68.2)	22.8 (73.0)	25.5 (77.9)	25.7 (78.3)	20.9 (69.6)	15.2 (59.4)	9.1 (48.4)	3.9 (39.0)	14.5 (58.1)
Daily mean °C (°F)	−2.5 (27.5)	−0.8 (30.6)	3.5 (38.3)	9.2 (48.6)	13.9 (57.0)	17.2 (63.0)	19.1 (66.4)	19.2 (66.6)	14.7 (58.5)	10.0 (50.0)	4.3 (39.7)	−0.9 (30.4)	8.9 (48.0)
Mean daily minimum °C (°F)	−6.1 (21.0)	−4.8 (23.4)	−1.8 (28.8)	3.1 (37.6)	7.6 (45.7)	10.5 (50.9)	11.7 (53.1)	11.5 (52.7)	8.5 (47.3)	4.6 (40.3)	−0.5 (31.1)	−4.6 (23.7)	3.3 (37.9)
Record low °C (°F)	−28.3 (−18.9)	−24.8 (−12.6)	−19.2 (−2.6)	−10.4 (13.3)	−2.7 (27.1)	0.4 (32.7)	2.9 (37.2)	1.1 (34.0)	−4.7 (23.5)	−7.4 (18.7)	−14.7 (5.5)	−23.6 (−10.5)	−28.1 (−18.6)
Average precipitation mm (inches)	45 (1.8)	37 (1.5)	43 (1.7)	61 (2.4)	82 (3.2)	89 (3.5)	67 (2.6)	46 (1.8)	48 (1.9)	52 (2.0)	52 (2.0)	48 (1.9)	670 (26.4)
Source 1: Stringmeteo.com
Source 2: Meteo.BG

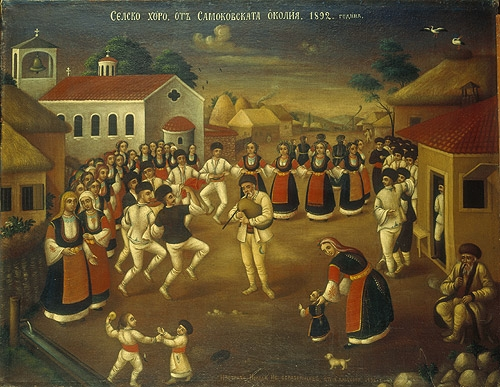
Nikola Obrazopisov (1827-1911): National round dance (horo) from Samokov area

== Honour ==
Samokov Knoll on Livingston Island in the South Shetland Islands, Antarctica is named after Samokov.

== Notable persons ==
- Mary Haskell (1869–1953) – American missionary at Samokov
- Isaac Alcalay (1882–1978) – Chief Rabbi of the Kingdom of Yugoslavia
- Victor Shem-Tov (1915–2014) – Israeli politician
- Nicolae Praida (1933-2008) - Romanian actor
- Petar Popangelov (* 1959) – Alpine skier
- Vladimir Zografski (* 1993) – Ski Jumper, junior world champion
- Katrin Taseva (* 1997) - Rhythmic gymnast
- Dakota Ditcheva (* 1998) - MMA fighter

== Gallery ==
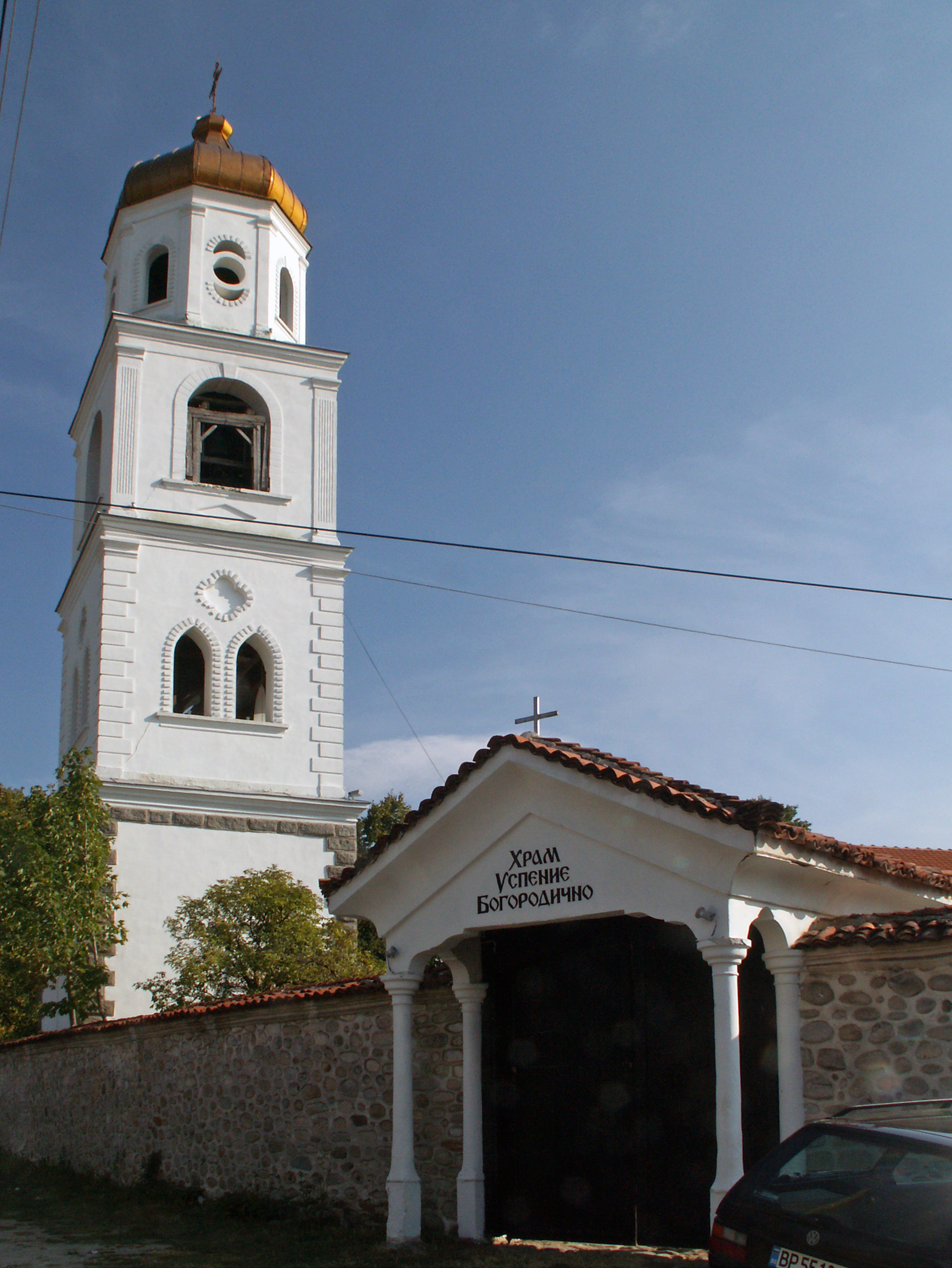
Church of the Dormition of the Holy Mother of God

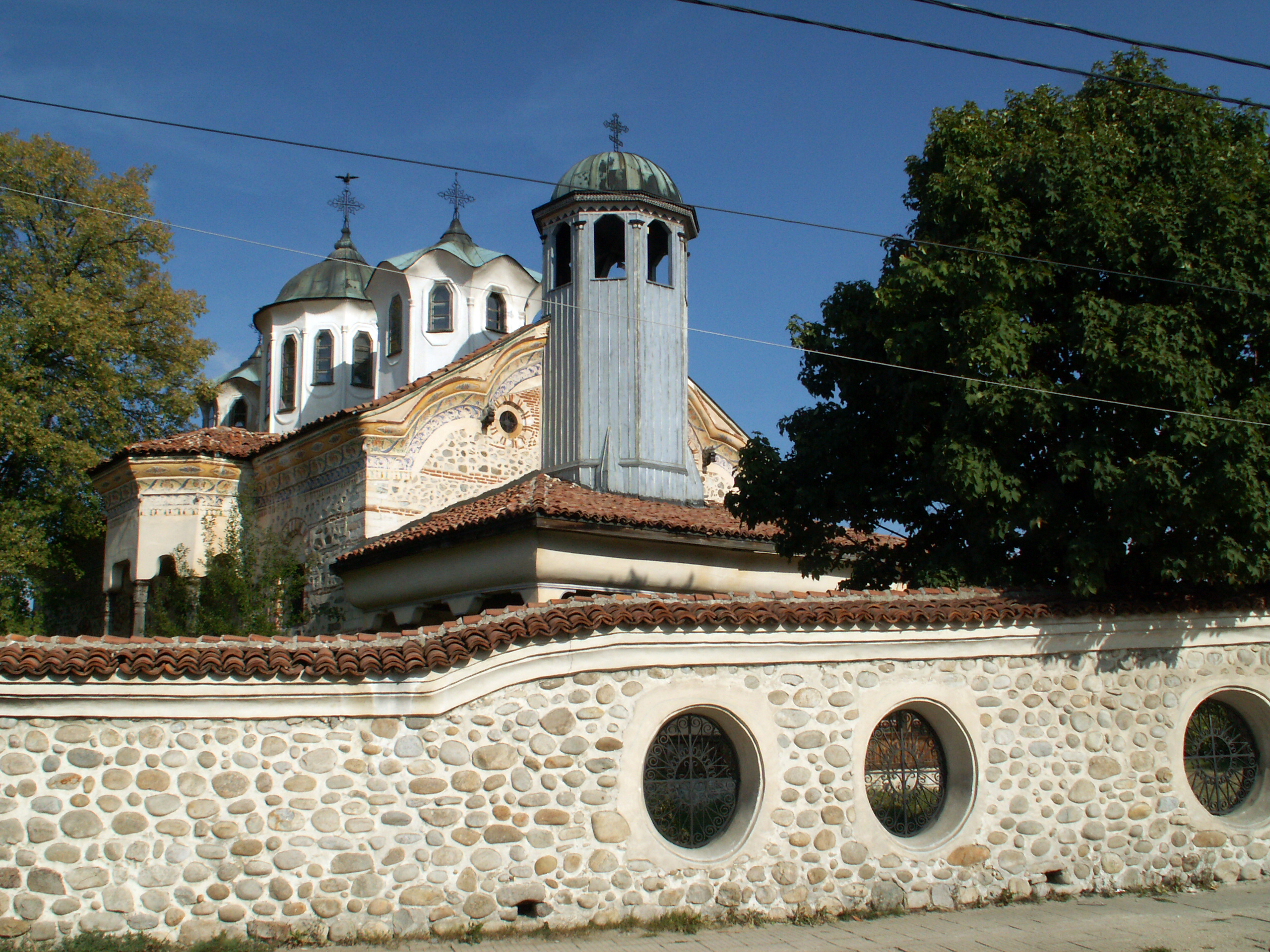
Church of St Nicholas from 1861

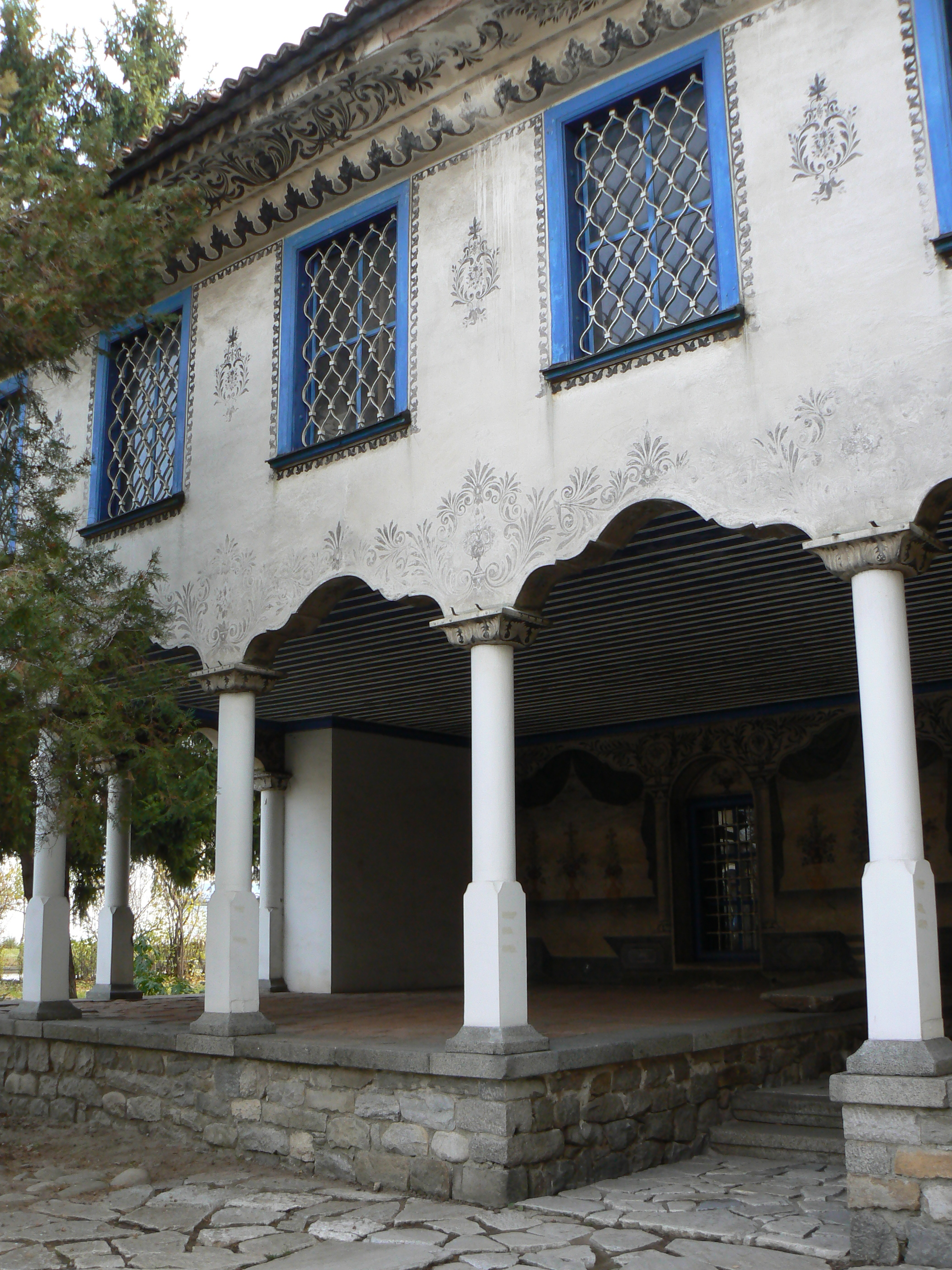
Bayrakli Mosque

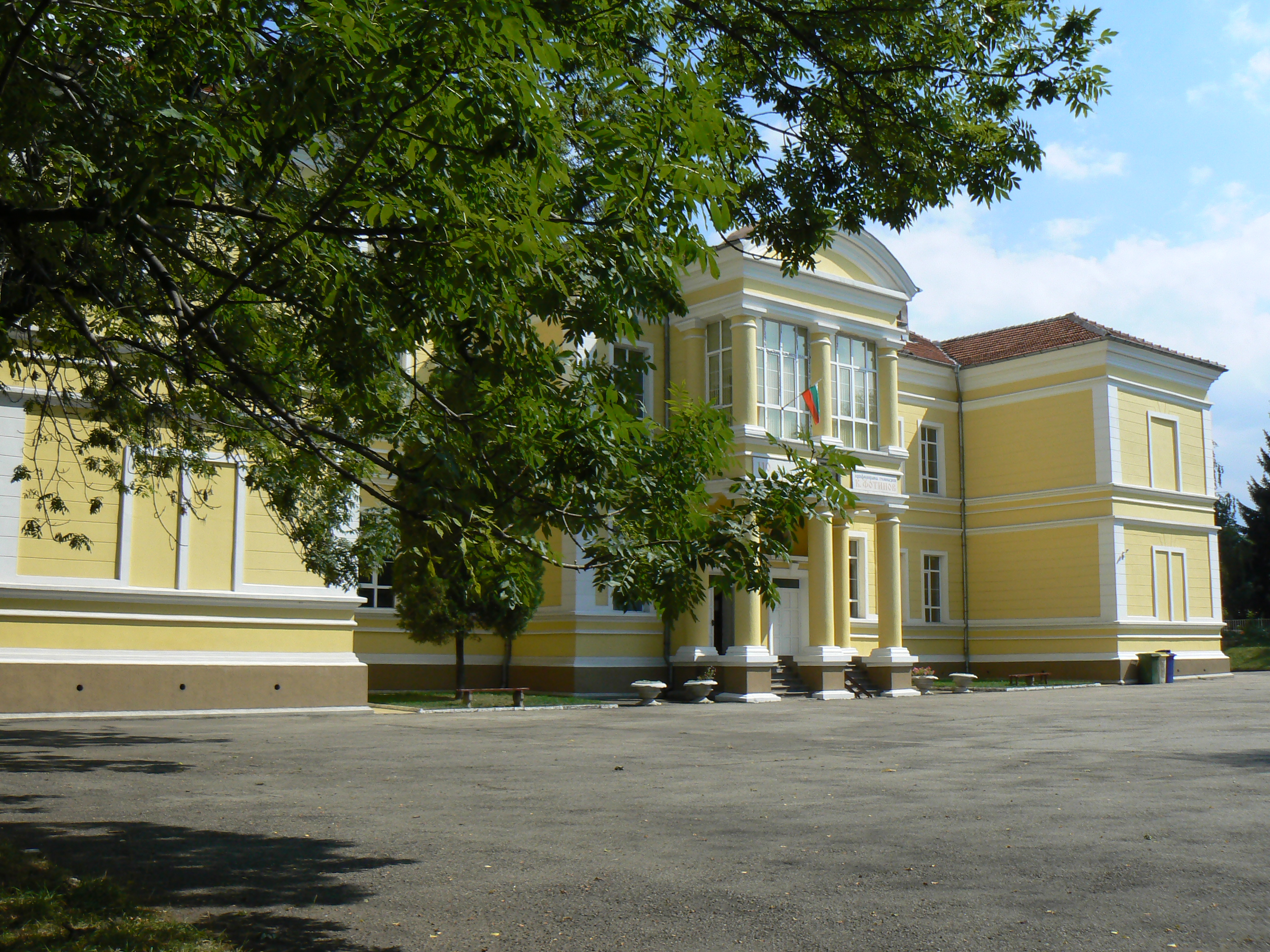
Konstantin Fotinov School

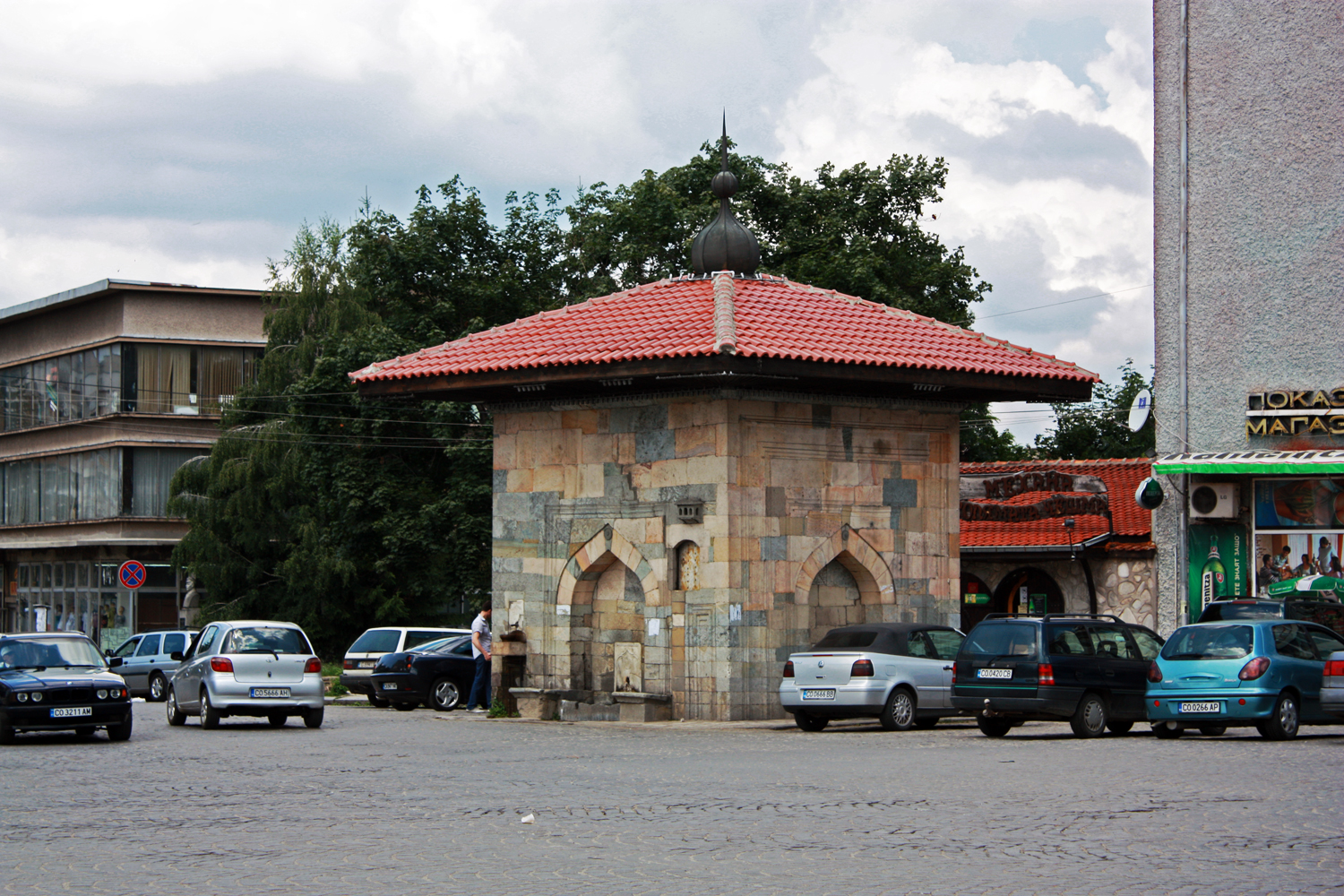
The Moorish-style Grand Fountain from 1660

== See also ==
- Battle of Çamurlu
