= National Register of Historic Places listings in Carroll County, Virginia =

Location of Carroll County in Virginia

This is a list of the National Register of Historic Places listings in Carroll County, Virginia.

This is intended to be a complete list of the properties and districts on the National Register of Historic Places in Carroll County, Virginia, United States. The locations of National Register properties and districts for which the latitude and longitude coordinates are included below, may be seen in an online map.

There are 11 properties and districts listed on the National Register in the county, including 1 National Historic Landmark.

This National Park Service list is complete through NPS recent listings posted March 6, 2026.

== Current listings ==
	Name on the Register	Image	Date listed	Location	City or town	Description
1	Sidna Allen House	Sidna Allen House	July 15, 1974 (#74002112)	North of Fancy Gap on U.S. Route 52; 36°41′35″N 80°41′36″W	Fancy Gap	
2	Blue Ridge Parkway	Blue Ridge Parkway	December 13, 2024 (#100011353)	Blue Ridge Parkway through Virginia and North Carolina; 36°37′43″N 80°44′40″W	Fancy Gap vicinity	
3	Buffalo Mountain Presbyterian Church and Cemetery	Buffalo Mountain Presbyterian Church and Cemetery	March 30, 2007 (#07000229)	2102 Childress Rd. 36°46′39″N 80°31′04″W	Willis	Church is in Carroll County; cemetery is in Floyd County
4	Carroll County Courthouse	Carroll County Courthouse	July 8, 1982 (#82004549)	515 Main St. 36°45′59″N 80°44′11″W	Hillsville	
5	Carter Hydraulic Rams	Carter Hydraulic Rams	November 21, 2002 (#02001373)	Off Grayson St. and U.S. Route 221; 36°46′03″N 80°43′56″W	Hillsville	
6	Dinwiddie Presbyterian Church and Cemetery	Dinwiddie Presbyterian Church and Cemetery	March 30, 2007 (#07000228)	2698 Homestead Rd. 36°51′46″N 80°43′02″W	Hillsville	
7	Hillsville Historic District	Hillsville Historic District	May 16, 2002 (#02000522)	300-500 blocks of Main St. 36°45′56″N 80°44′13″W	Hillsville	
8	Little Valley School		May 8, 2025 (#100011809)	880 Little Valley Road; 36°41′19″N 80°28′43″W	Meadows of Dan	
9	Point Pleasant School	Point Pleasant School	October 31, 2007 (#07001133)	Laurel Fork Rd. 36°43′40″N 80°33′24″W	Laurel Fork	
10	Snake Creek Farm Historic District	Snake Creek Farm Historic District	January 11, 1991 (#90002138)	Snake Creek Rd. south of its junction with Red Hill Rd. 36°42′53″N 80°38′52″W	Hillsville	
11	Woodlawn School	Woodlawn School	January 17, 2019 (#100003322)	745 Woodlawn Rd. 36°43′39″N 80°49′06″W	Woodlawn	

== See also ==
- List of National Historic Landmarks in Virginia
- National Register of Historic Places listings in Virginia
