= Carter Hydraulic Rams =

- U.S. National Register of Historic Places
- Virginia Landmarks Register
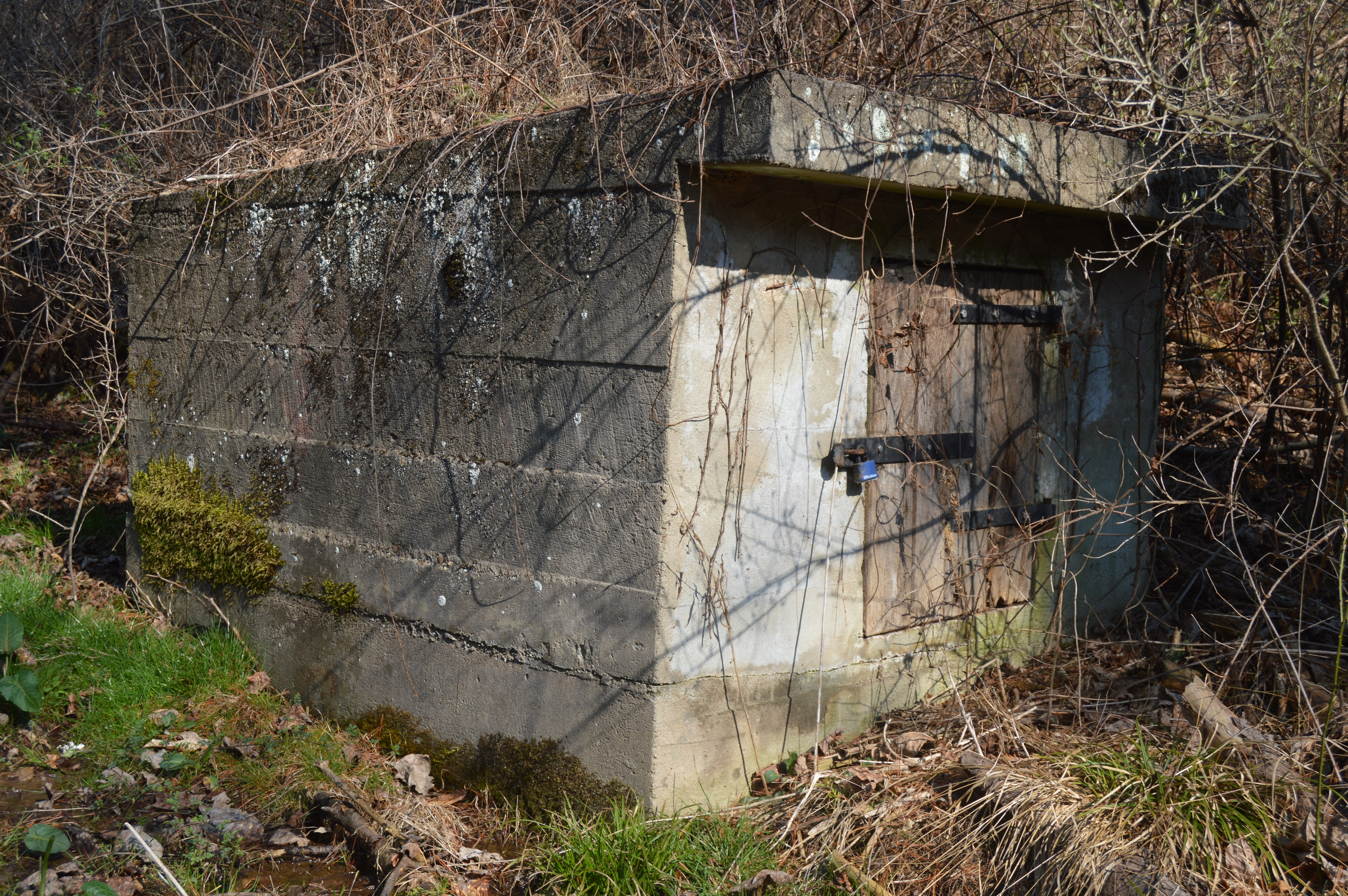
- One of the rams in its casing

- Location within Virginia Location within the United States
- Location: Off Grayson St. and US 221, Hillsville, Virginia
- Coordinates: 36°46′3″N 80°43′56″W
- Area: 3 acres (1.2 ha)
- Built: 1924
- NRHP reference No.: 02001373
- VLR No.: 237-5003

Significant dates
- Added to NRHP: November 21, 2002
- Designated VLR: September 11, 2002

The Carter Hydraulic Rams were constructed circa 1924 by George Lafayette Carter to supply water to his summer residence near Hillsville, Carroll County, Virginia. A series of four hydraulic rams are housed in concrete and tile block pumphouses along an intermittent stream. A nearby gas-powered pump provided backup power, but when the rams were in operation they depended only on the flow of water for their operation. The rams were supplanted in the 1950s by an electric pump system.

It was added to the National Register of Historic Places in 2002.

The rams can be visited while walking along the Beaver Dam Creek Trail, which is part of Carter Pines Community Park. Historical markers describe the history of these hydraulic rams.
