= Hillsville Historic District =

Historic district in Virginia, United States

- U.S. National Register of Historic Places
- U.S. Historic district
- Virginia Landmarks Register
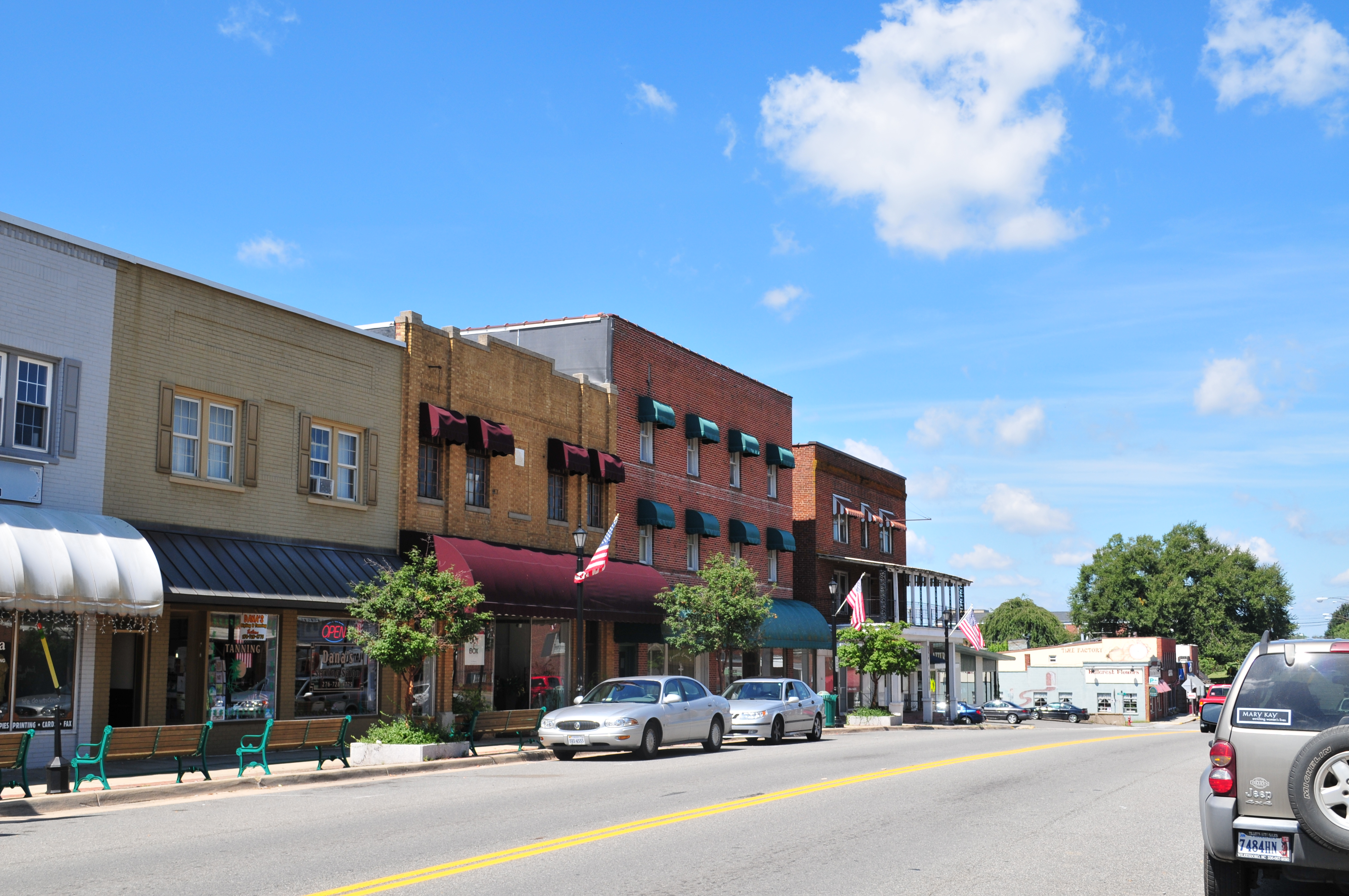

- Location within Virginia Location within the United States
- Location: 300-500 Blocks of Main St., Hillsville, Virginia
- Coordinates: 36°45′56″N 80°44′13″W
- Area: 5 acres (2.0 ha)
- Built: 1857
- Architect: Coltrane, Col. Ira Blair
- Architectural style: Classical Revival, Art Deco
- NRHP reference No.: 02000522
- VLR No.: 237-5002

Significant dates
- Added to NRHP: May 16, 2002
- Designated VLR: September 12, 2001

Hillsville Historic District is a national historic district located at Hillsville, Carroll County, Virginia. The district encompasses 14 contributing buildings and 1 contributing object in the core commercial district of Hillsville. Notable properties include the Carter Building (1857), Carroll County Bank (1907), and the Hillsville Diner (1936). Also in the district is the former U.S. Post Office (1951) that houses the Carroll County Historical Society. The remaining buildings are two- and three-story brick commercial buildings from the 1930s and 1940s. The Carroll County Courthouse is located in the district and separately listed.

It was listed on the National Register of Historic Places in 2002.
