= Carroll County Courthouse (Virginia) =

Historic courthouse in Virginia, US

- U.S. National Register of Historic Places
- Virginia Landmarks Register
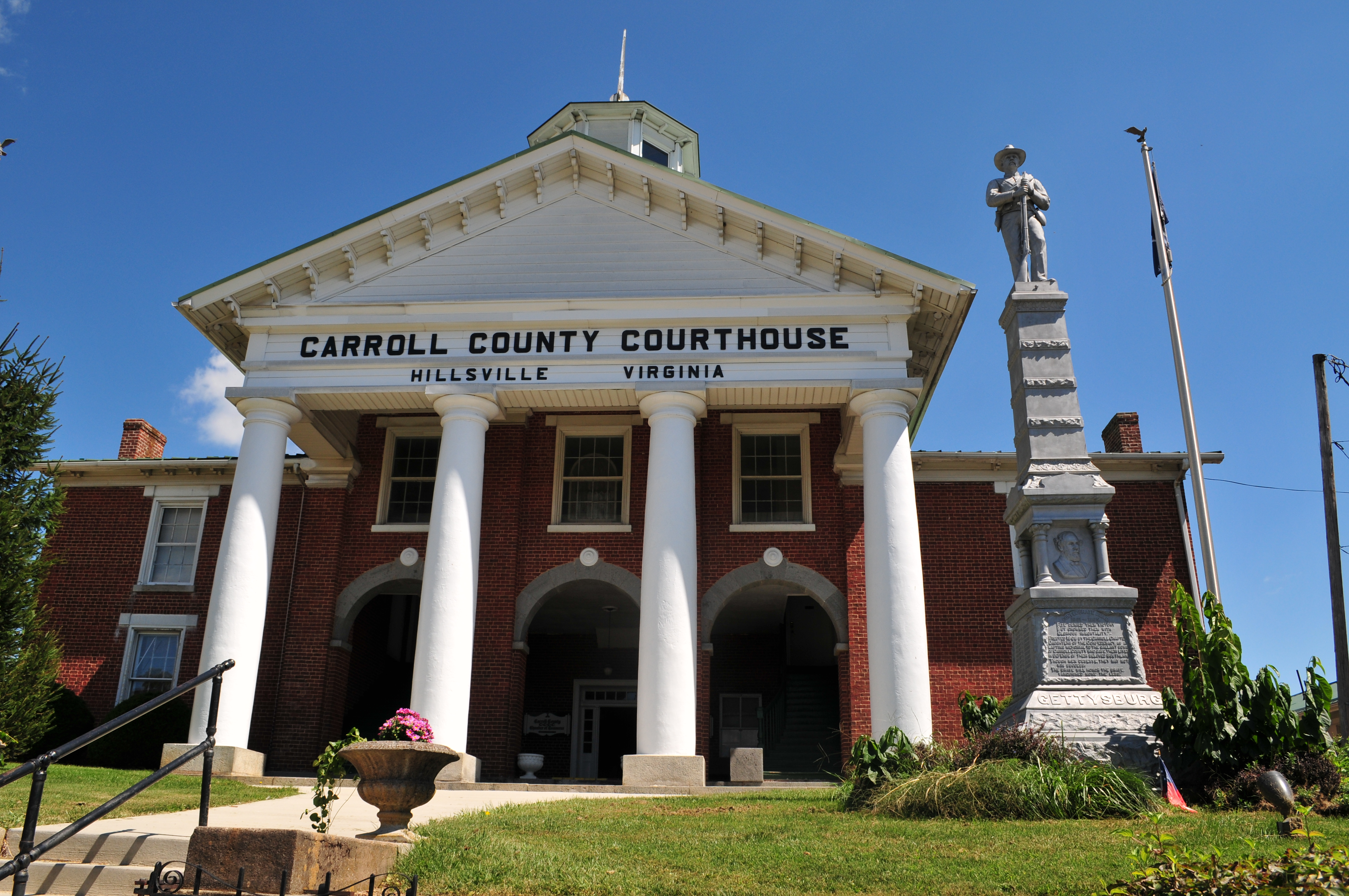
- Carroll County Courthouse and Confederate Monument

- Location within Virginia Location within the United States
- Location: 515 Main St., Hillsville, Virginia
- Coordinates: 36°45′58″N 80°44′12″W
- Area: 0.5 acres (0.20 ha)
- Built: 1870
- Architect: Coltrane, Col. Ira
- NRHP reference No.: 82004549
- VLR No.: 237-0001

Significant dates
- Added to NRHP: July 8, 1982
- Designated VLR: September 15, 1981, October 18, 2004

The Carroll County Courthouse is a historic county courthouse located at Hillsville, Carroll County, Virginia. It was built between 1870 and 1875, and is a two-story brick building with a gable roof. It features a two-story, pedimented portico in the Doric order. The building is topped by an octagonal cupola. The courthouse was the scene of the famous Hillsville massacre of March 14, 1912, in which five persons, including the presiding judge, were killed in a courtroom battle.

The courthouse was listed on the National Register of Historic Places in 1982.

== Carroll County Historical Society and Museum ==
The Carroll County Historical Society and Museum is located in the historic courthouse. The museum is focused on the heritage and culture of Carroll County, and includes early Native American and Civil War artifacts. The Society also offers tours of the historic building.
