= Sidna Allen House =

Historic house in Virginia, United States

- U.S. National Register of Historic Places
- Virginia Landmarks Register
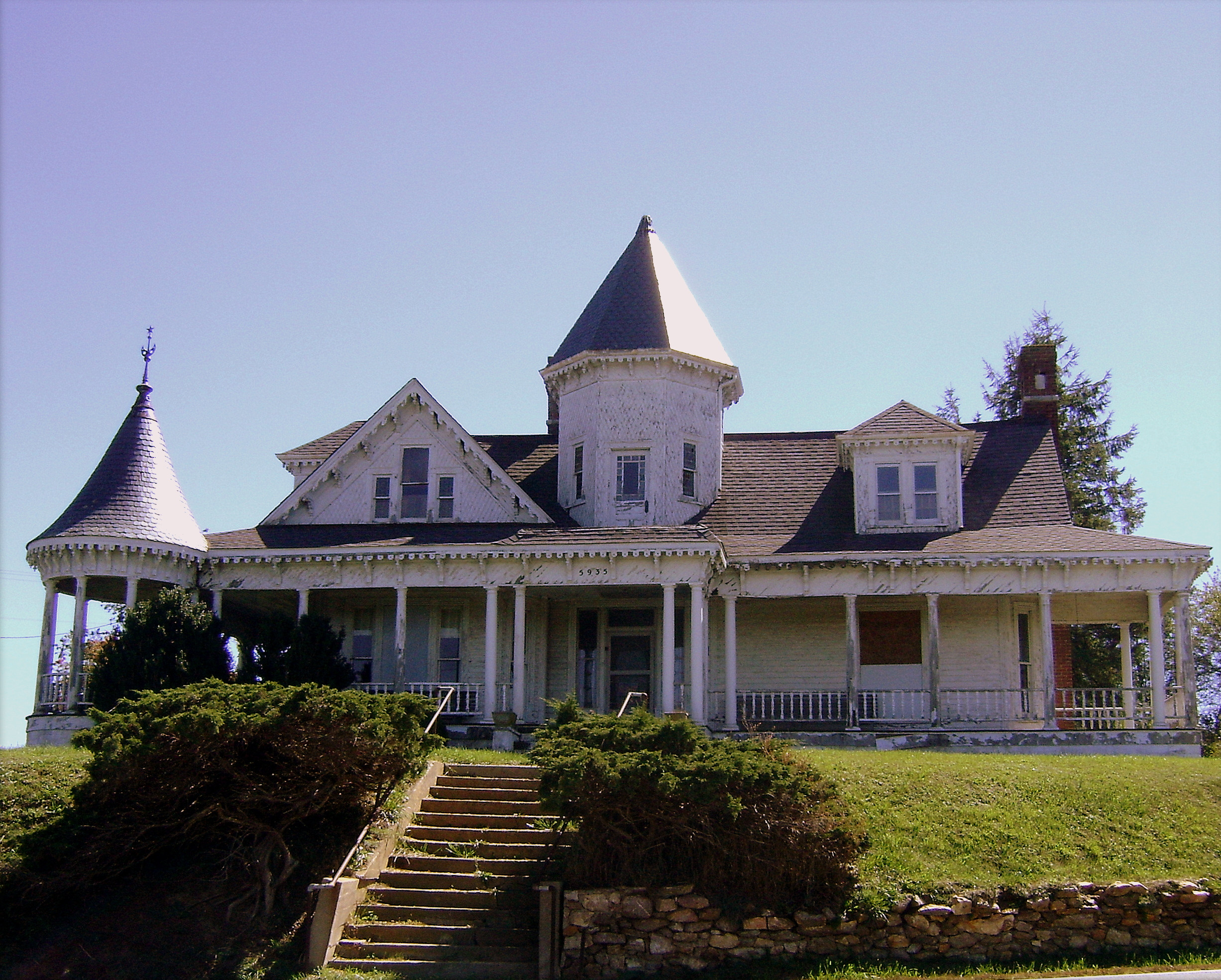
- Sidna Allen House, September 2012

- Location within Virginia Location within the United States
- Location: N of Fancy Gap on U.S. 52, near Fancy Gap, Virginia
- Coordinates: 36°41′39″N 80°41′39″W
- Area: 23 acres (9.3 ha)
- Built: 1911
- Architect: Allen, J. Sidna; Dickens, Preston
- Architectural style: Queen Anne
- NRHP reference No.: 74002112
- VLR No.: 017-0005

Significant dates
- Added to NRHP: July 15, 1974
- Designated VLR: January 15, 1974

The Sidna Allen House is a historic house located near the town of Fancy Gap, in Carroll County, Virginia. The house was built in 1911 for Sidna Allen, brother of Floyd Allen; however, he was arrested soon thereafter for complicity in the courthouse shooting of which his brother was accused, and never again lived there.

On January 27, 1901, when Sidna Allen was 35 years old he married Bettie Mitchell. After Sidna and Bettie married, they decided to build a house. According to the book The Courthouse Tragedy, the whole house was made of the best wood around, and there were eight rooms in the house. In the book it says, "The floors were of oak, except the floor of our living room, which was white maple." The walls in the house were all plastered. It also says, "In the dining room we used quarter-sawed oak, finished in natural color wainscoting." The roof of the house was made of slate, which back then, all this wood and other materials were very expensive. They had a windmill at the house, and an acetylene generator which is what provided them with lights. The house was worth $13,000.00 in 1911. But a year later, the Hillsville courthouse massacre occurred. Sidna and his wife had only lived there one year.

The house was added to the National Register of Historic Places in 1974.

The house is owned by the Carroll County Historical Society and is currently closed for restoration, donated by the Widener family, Bonnie Wood and Stanley Widener.
