= Conrad R. Duncan =

American politician (1928–1992)

Conrad Riley Duncan Jr.

Member of the North Carolina House of Representatives
- In office 1975 – October 10, 1977
- Succeeded by: Robert McAllister

Member of the North Carolina Senate
- In office 1977–???

Personal details
- Born: October 9, 1928 Carroll County, Virginia, U.S.
- Died: October 10, 1992 (aged 64) Greensboro, North Carolina, US
- Party: Democratic
- Spouse: Becky Tuttle (m. 1951)
- Children: 4

Conrad Riley Duncan Jr. (October 9, 1928 – October 10, 1992) was an American politician. He served as a Democratic member of the North Carolina House of Representatives. He also served as a member of the North Carolina Senate.

== Life and career ==
Duncan was born in Carroll County, Virginia.

Duncan was a member of the North Carolina House of Representatives, serving until 1977, when he was succeeded by Robert McAllister. He was also a member of the North Carolina Senate.

Duncan died on October 10, 1992 in Greensboro, North Carolina at the age of 64.
