= Charles B. Morris =

American soldier and Medal of Honor recipient

Charles Bedford Morris
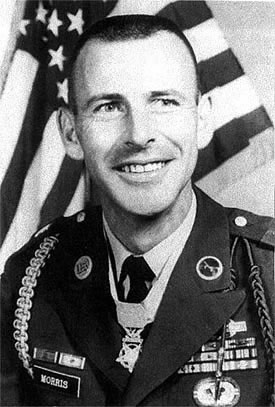
- Charles Morris
- Born: December 29, 1931; Carroll County, Virginia, U.S.
- Died: August 22, 1996 (aged 64)
- Burial place: Morris Cemetery, Fancy Gap, Virginia
- Military career
- Allegiance: United States
- Branch: United States Army
- Service years: 1952 - 1981
- Rank: Sergeant major
- Units: 503rd Infantry Regiment, 173d Airborne Brigade (Separate)
- Conflicts: Korean War; Vietnam War
- Awards: Medal of Honor; Bronze Star; Purple Heart

Charles Bedford Morris (December 29, 1931 – August 22, 1996) was a United States Army soldier and a recipient of the United States military's highest decoration—the Medal of Honor—for his actions in the Vietnam War.

== Biography ==
Morris joined the Army from Roanoke, Virginia, in 1953, and briefly served during the Korean War before serving in Vietnam. By June 29, 1966, he was a sergeant in Company A, 2d Battalion (Airborne), 503rd Infantry Regiment, 173d Airborne Brigade (Separate). During a firefight on that day in the Republic of Vietnam, Morris continued to lead his squad, fight the enemy, and help the wounded despite being wounded himself four separate times. For his actions during the battle, he was promoted to staff sergeant and, on December 14, 1967, awarded the Medal of Honor.

Morris reached the highest enlisted rank, sergeant major, before retiring from the Army. He died at age 64 and was buried in Morris Cemetery, Fancy Gap, Virginia.

== Medal of Honor citation ==
Medal of Honor

Staff Sergeant Morris' Medal of Honor citation reads:

For conspicuous gallantry and intrepidity at the risk of his life above and beyond the call of duty. Seeing indications of the enemy's presence in the area, S/Sgt. Morris deployed his squad and continued forward alone to make a reconnaissance. He unknowingly crawled within 20 meters of an enemy machinegun, whereupon the gunner fired, wounding him in the chest. S/Sgt. Morris instantly returned the fire and killed the gunner. Continuing to crawl within a few feet of the gun, he hurled a grenade and killed the remainder of the enemy crew. Although in pain and bleeding profusely, S/Sgt. Morris continued his reconnaissance. Returning to the platoon area, he reported the results of his reconnaissance to the platoon leader. As he spoke, the platoon came under heavy fire. Refusing medical attention for himself, he deployed his men in better firing positions confronting the entrenched enemy to his front. Then for 8 hours the platoon engaged the numerically superior enemy force. Withdrawal was impossible without abandoning many wounded and dead. Finding the platoon medic dead, S/Sgt. Morris administered first aid to himself and was returning to treat the wounded members of his squad with the medic's first aid kit when he was again wounded. Knocked down and stunned, he regained consciousness and continued to treat the wounded, reposition his men, and inspire and encourage their efforts. Wounded again when an enemy grenade shattered his left hand, nonetheless he personally took up the fight and armed and threw several grenades which killed a number of enemy soldiers. Seeing that an enemy machinegun had maneuvered behind his platoon and was delivering the fire upon his men, S/Sgt. Morris and another man crawled toward the gun to knock it out. His comrade was killed and S/Sgt. Morris sustained another wound, but, firing his rifle with 1 hand, he silenced the enemy machinegun. Returning to the platoon, he courageously exposed himself to the devastating enemy fire to drag the wounded to a protected area, and with utter disregard for his personal safety and the pain he suffered, he continued to lead and direct the efforts of his men until relief arrived. Upon termination of the battle, important documents were found among the enemy dead revealing a planned ambush of a Republic of Vietnam battalion. Use of this information prevented the ambush and saved many lives. S/Sgt. Morris' gallantry was instrumental in the successful defeat of the enemy, saved many lives, and was in the highest traditions of the U.S. Army.

== Awards and decorations ==

Badge	Combat Infantryman Badge with Star denoting 2nd Award		
1st row	Medal of Honor Upgraded from DSC	Bronze Star Medal	Purple Heart with 1 Oak leaf cluster
2nd row	Army Commendation Medal with 2 Oak leaf clusters	Army Good Conduct Medal with 5 Good Conduct Loops	National Defense Service Medal with 1 Service star
3rd row	Korean Service Medal with 2 Campaign stars	Armed Forces Expeditionary Medal	Vietnam Service Medal with 2 Campaign stars
4th row	NCO Professional Development Ribbon (Retroactively Awarded, 1981)	Army Service Ribbon	Overseas Service Ribbon (Retroactively Awarded, 1981)
5th row	United Nations Service Medal Korea	Vietnam Campaign Medal	Korean War Service Medal (Retroactively Awarded, 2001)
Badge	Parachutist Badge With 1 Combat Jump Star		
Unit awards	Presidential Unit Citation	Korean Presidential Unit Citation	Republic of Vietnam Gallantry Cross Unit Citation With Palm

== See also ==
- List of Medal of Honor recipients
- List of Medal of Honor recipients for the Vietnam War
