= Dugspur, Virginia =

- Unincorporated community
- Location within Virginia Location within the United States
- Coordinates: 36°49′04″N 80°36′35″W
- Country: United States
- State: Virginia
- County: Carroll
- Elevation: 2,661 ft (811 m)
- Time zone: UTC-5 (Eastern (EST))
  - Summer (DST): UTC-4 (EDT)
- ZIP code: 24325
- Area code: 276
- GNIS feature ID: 1492887

Dugspur is an unincorporated community in Carroll County, Virginia, United States. Dugspur is located along U.S. Route 221, 7.9 miles (12.7 km) east-northeast of Hillsville. Dugspur has a post office with ZIP code 24325, which opened on August 6, 1850.
