= Devil's Den (disambiguation) =

Devil's Den is on the Civil War battlefield at Gettysburg, Pennsylvania.

Devil's Den may also refer to:

== Places ==
- Devil's Den State Park, in West Fork, Arkansas
- Devils Den, California, a historic settlement near Salt Spring in Kern County, California
- Devil's Den Preserve, in Fairfield County, Connecticut
- Devil's Den Cave, in Williston, Florida
- Devil's Den Nature Preserve, in Carroll County, Virginia
- The Devil's Den, a burial chamber in Wiltshire, Great Britain

== Other uses ==
- Devil's Den (film), a 2006 movie directed by Jeff Burr
- Devil's Den (game), a board wargame based upon the Civil War fight
- "The Devil's Den", song by Skrillex and Wolfgang Gartner from Bangarang
- Devil's Den, a 1948 movie starring Leo Carrillo
