= Point Pleasant School =

- U.S. National Register of Historic Places
- Virginia Landmarks Register
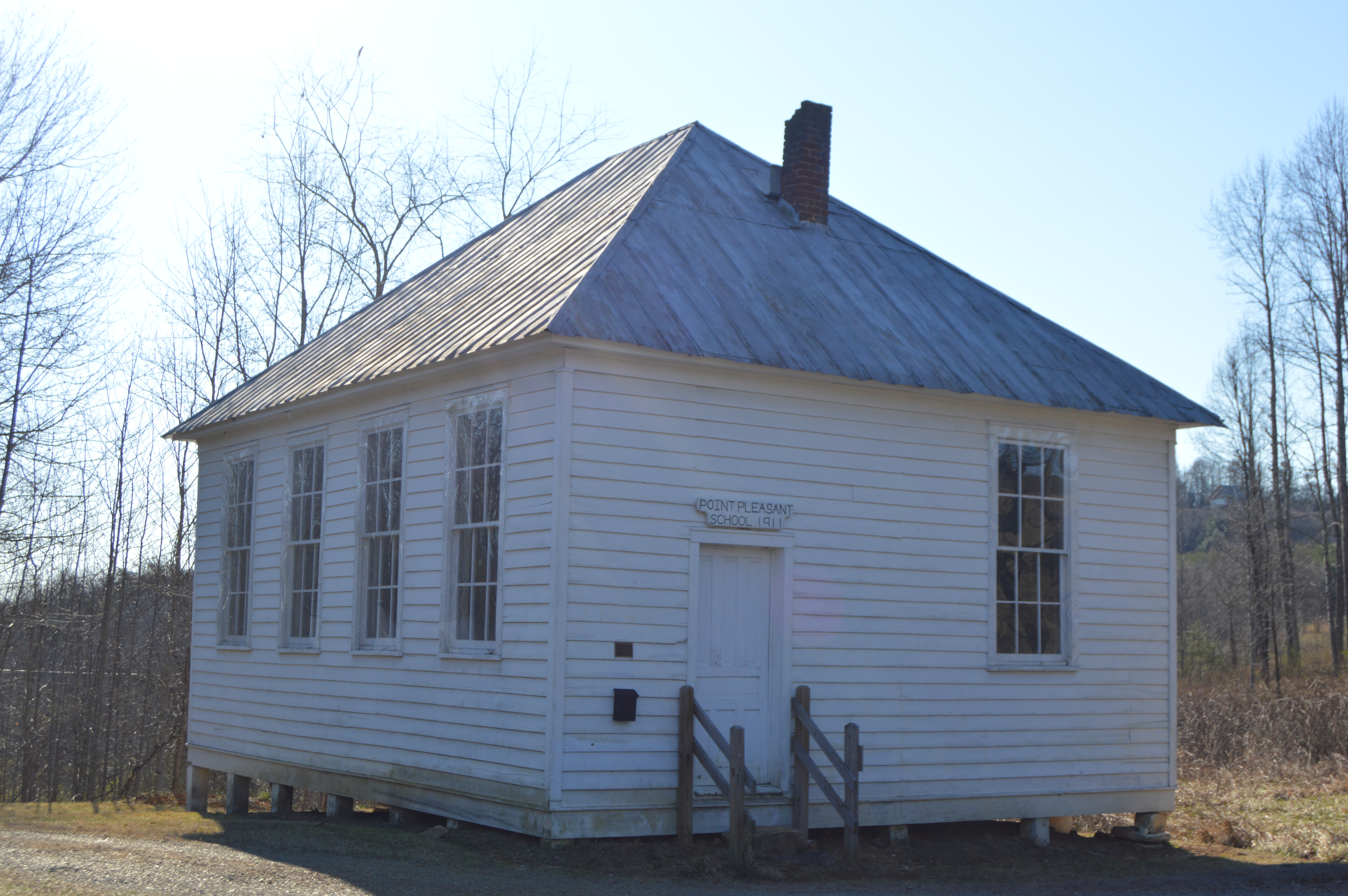
- Front and northern side

- Location within Virginia Location within the United States
- Location: Laurel Fork Rd., Laurel Fork, Virginia
- Coordinates: 36°43′40″N 80°33′25″W
- Area: Less than 1 acre (0.40 ha)
- Built: 1911
- NRHP reference No.: 07001133
- VLR No.: 017-5010

Significant dates
- Added to NRHP: October 31, 2007
- Designated VLR: September 5, 2007

Point Pleasant School is a historic one-room school building located at Laurel Fork, Carroll County, Virginia. It was built in 1911, and is a one-story, weatherboarded, frame building with a rectangular footprint measuring approximately 34 feet by 37 feet. It has a steeply pitched hipped roof that is nearly pyramidal. The school closed in 1948–1949.

It was added to the National Register of Historic Places in 2007.
