= Woodlawn High School (Woodlawn, Virginia) =

Location
- Woodlawn, Virginia 24381; United States; 36°43′37″N 80°49′07″W

Information
- School type: private / normal institute / public secondary
- Founded: 1878
- Status: consolidated into Carroll County High School (Virginia) in 1969
- Colours: Maroon and White
- Mascot: Raiders
- Newspaper: The Reminder
- Yearbook: Raider
- Woodlawn School
- U.S. National Register of Historic Places
- Virginia Landmarks Register
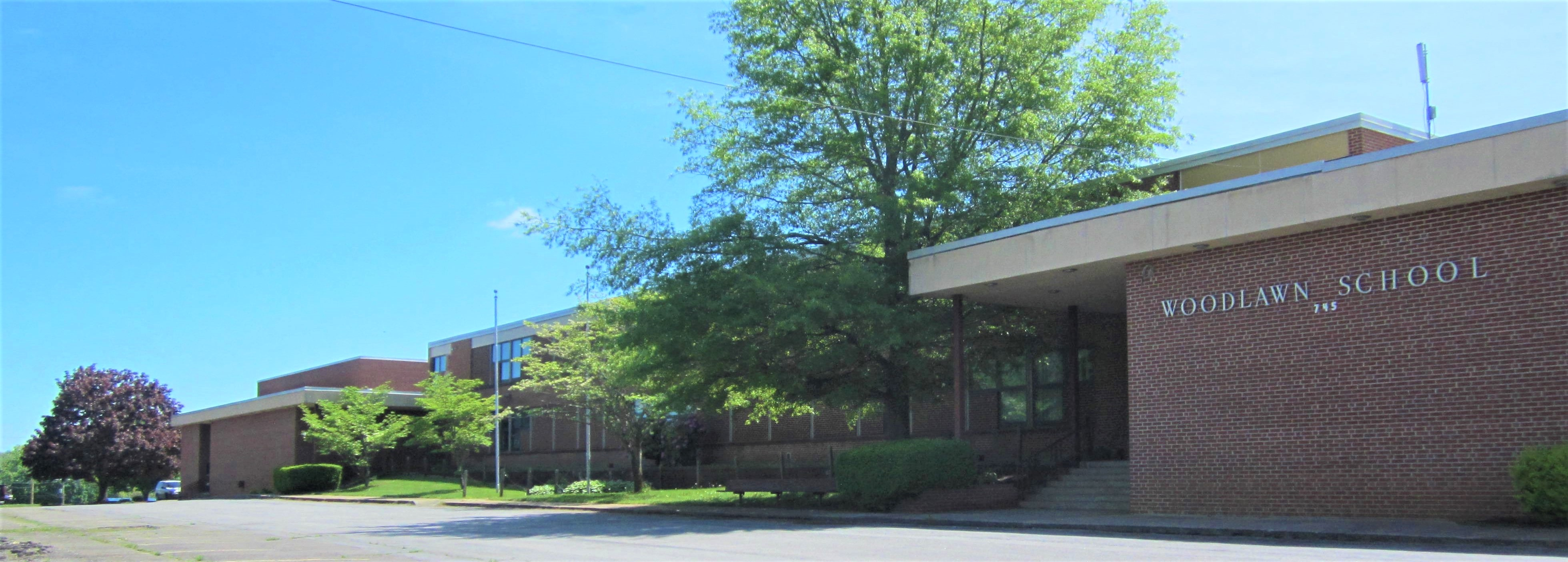

- Location within Virginia Location within the United States
- NRHP reference No.: 100003322
- VLR No.: 017-5160

Significant dates
- Added to NRHP: January 17, 2019
- Designated VLR: September 20, 2018

Woodlawn High School, later known as Woodlawn School, was a public secondary school located in Carroll County, Virginia, at Woodlawn, Virginia. The school served students in all grades, one through twelve, for much of its history. The last academic year as a high school was 1968–1969. One hundred and four seniors graduated in the final class of 1969. The following year all tenth, eleventh and twelfth grade students became part of the new Carroll County High School (Virginia). After 136 years of service the Carroll County School Board voted to close the school in 2013. The school was repurposed and refurbished as the Woodlawn School Apartments.

== History ==
The school was founded in 1878 by Isaac A. Minor as a private school called the Woodlawn Male and Female Academy. In 1898 the name was changed to the Woodlawn Normal Institute and later to Woodlawn High School in 1907. It became the first public high school in Carroll County and was among the earliest in the state of Virginia.

=== Early years ===
Woodlawn Male and Female Academy was a boarding school attracting students from several nearby counties and states. While most out-of-state students were from North Carolina, one student was known to attend the school from as far away as California. There were 123 students enrolled with 25 teachers on staff in 1898. A dormitory was constructed on campus to house students but was destroyed by fire in 1903.

A new three story dormitory followed in 1904 with a cafeteria, parlor, music room and rooms for boarders. At one time it also contained one of the first circulating school libraries in Virginia. This building was later used by the high school for a cafeteria, supply store and extra classrooms until it too was destroyed by fire on January 27, 1960.

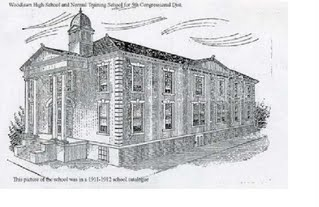
Woodlawn High School's early, main academic building. Construction began in 1907 and the building opened in 1909.

The Virginia General Assembly doubled the state's education budget in 1906 and passed the Mann High School Bill. This bill, named after Senator William Hodges Mann of Nottoway County, obligated the state to pay matching funds to any district that built a high school. Over the next four years, Virginia school districts constructed 285 new high schools including Woodlawn.

The honorable Claude A. Swanson was governor of Virginia in 1906 when money was appropriated to establish a public high school at Woodlawn. The school also received additional funds to provide teacher training in conjunction with the high school. This was before the establishment of Radford State Teachers College (Radford University), hence there were no institutions for teacher training in this section of Virginia at that time.

Construction of the high school's early, main academic building began in 1907 on twelve acres of land. Members of the Woodlawn community raised the needed funds for the project themselves without government assistance. The building opened to students on January 19, 1909. Two additional classrooms and an auditorium were added to the building in the 1930s. Four additional classrooms were added to house elementary grades in the early 1950s.

=== First vocational agriculture classes in the United States ===
Woodlawn High School became the first public secondary school in the United States to offer vocational agricultural education classes under the Smith-Hughes Act. J. Lee Cox, superintendent of Carroll County Schools at the time, 1917, is given much credit for seeing the need for vocational agriculture classes. He went to the state capitol and persuaded the governor, Henry Carter Stuart, to let him develop the classes at Woodlawn. Fred R. Kirby, the first teacher of agriculture at the school, was named Master Teacher of the South in 1933. Kirby's successor, W.L. Creasy, was also named Master Teacher of the South in 1936.

The agricultural classes greatly benefited the rural farming areas around Woodlawn. They offered students instruction in many areas including: farm administration, crop cultivation, crop fertilization, erosion control, livestock care, forestry, building maintenance and building construction. Noted accomplishments of the classes included: higher yields on area farms, greater crop diversity, substantial investment in dairy and beef production, the introduction of permanent pastures, use of strip cropping to increase crop yield and decrease soil erosion. The classes also aided in the establishment of a Carnation Milk plant in nearby Galax, Virginia to support area dairy farms. Most importantly, the classes increased interest in school among young boys versus quitting school early.

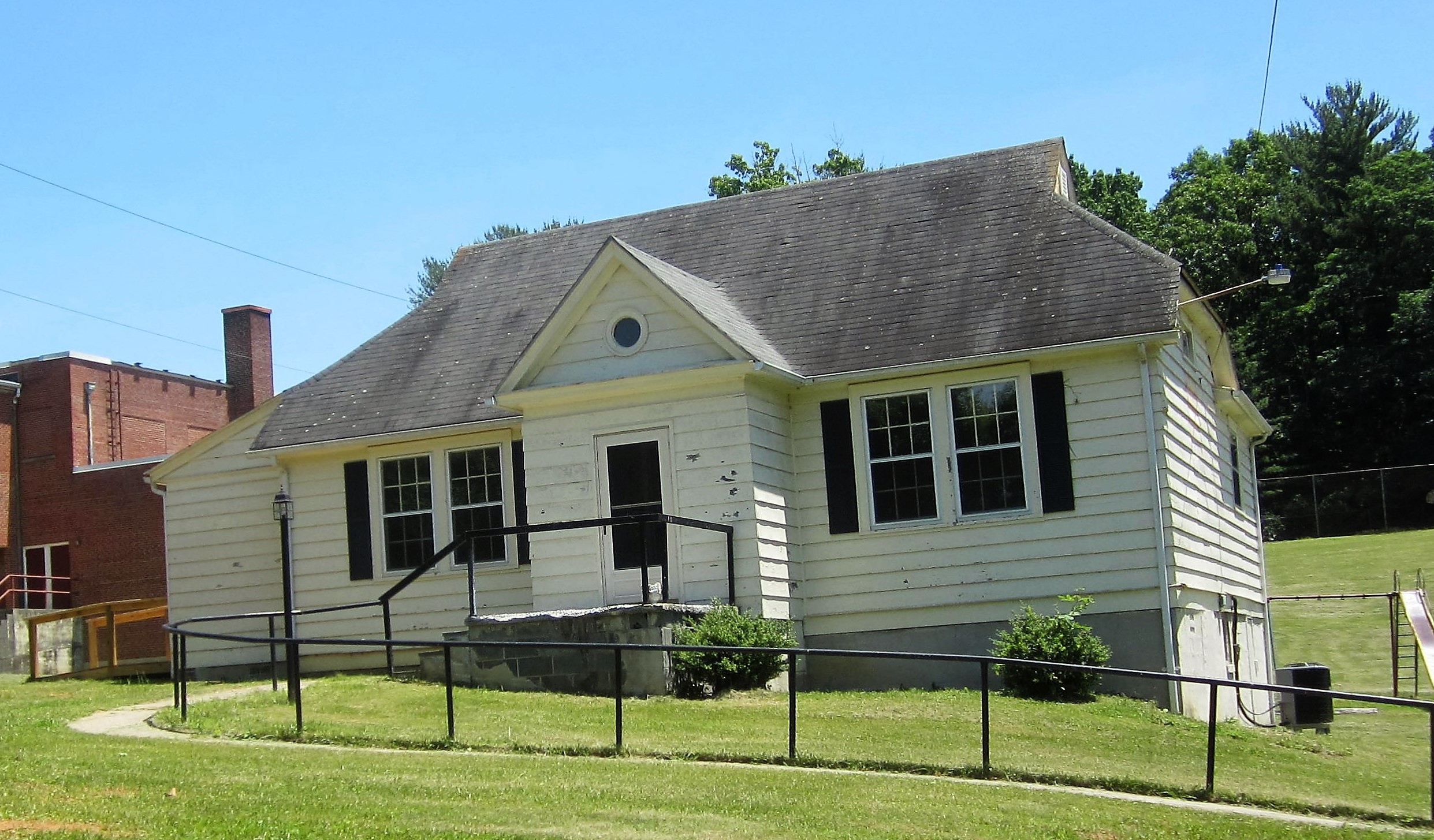
1924 home economics cottage as it appeared in 2018.

Home economics was added to the curriculum in 1916. A cottage was built on campus in 1924 to house this department. In 1962, the home economics department was moved to a new high school building and the cottage became the home of the high school band. It was renovated again in 1975 and served for many years as the Carroll County Adult Education Center.

Construction of a new, modern high school building was begun in the summer of 1961. The building included many new classrooms, science labs, a home economics department, library, cafeteria, a business department and administrative offices. The building opened for the 1962-1963 academic year on what had been the footprint of the 1904 dormitory. That same year brought additional students, additional faculty members, an elementary/secondary band program and an expanded curriculum offering students more course choices.

=== Consolidation into Carroll County High School ===
The last year for Woodlawn High School was 1968-1969 with consolidation into Carroll County High School (Virginia) located just outside the town limits of Hillsville, Virginia. The school became an intermediate school for grades K-9 beginning with the 1969-70 academic year.

Kylene Barker, Miss Virginia 1978 and Miss America 1979, attended the school in the early 1970s. She became the first Miss Virginia to win the Miss America title.

Map of Virginia highlighting Carroll County

In 1974 the school's entire physical plant was renovated. A new gymnasium, library, band room, music room, art department, vocational agriculture department, career development center and additional classrooms were added. The cafeteria was enlarged and administrative offices were expanded.

The school became a K-7 school in 1993 with the moving of eighth and ninth grade students to Carroll County Intermediate School in Hillsville, Virginia. In 2005, grade K-5 students were moved to new, expanded county elementary schools, creating Woodlawn Middle School housing grades six and seven only. Woodlawn Middle School was officially closed in June, 2013. Beginning with the 2013-2014 academic year, students attended the newly formed Carroll County Middle School Hillsville, Virginia.

=== After the school's closing ===
In July 2018, a Winston-Salem, N.C.-based real estate development and property management firm (Landmark), entered into an agreement with the Carroll County Industrial Development Authority (IDA) to refurbish and repurpose Woodlawn School. The approximate $9.8 million project will convert the building to 51 affordable one, two and three-bedroom apartments. The project will also feature amenities such as a park, walking trail and children’s recreation facilities.

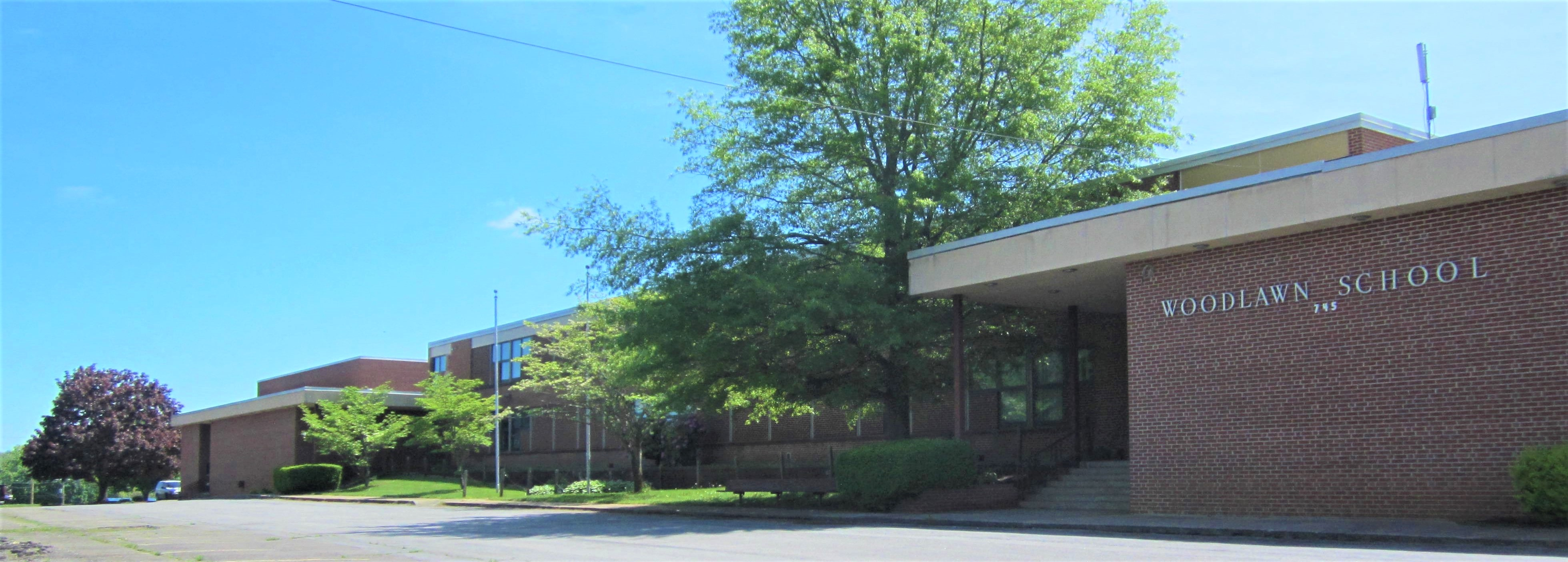
Front entrance of Woodlawn School, Spring 2019.

In September 2018, the school was added to the Virginia Landmarks Register by the Virginia Department of Historic Resources. This is the state's official list of important historic sites, it was created in 1966. On January 17, 2019, Woodlawn School was added to the National Register of Historic Places. This is the official list of historic buildings, districts, sites, structures, and objects worthy of preservation in the United States of America. It was established as part of the National Historic Preservation Act of 1966 and is overseen by the National Park Service.

== Community ==
The area of present day Woodlawn, located in Virginia’s Blue Ridge Mountains, began as a land grant to James Wood of Frederick County, Virginia in 1756. His son, James Wood, served as governor of Virginia from 1796–1799.

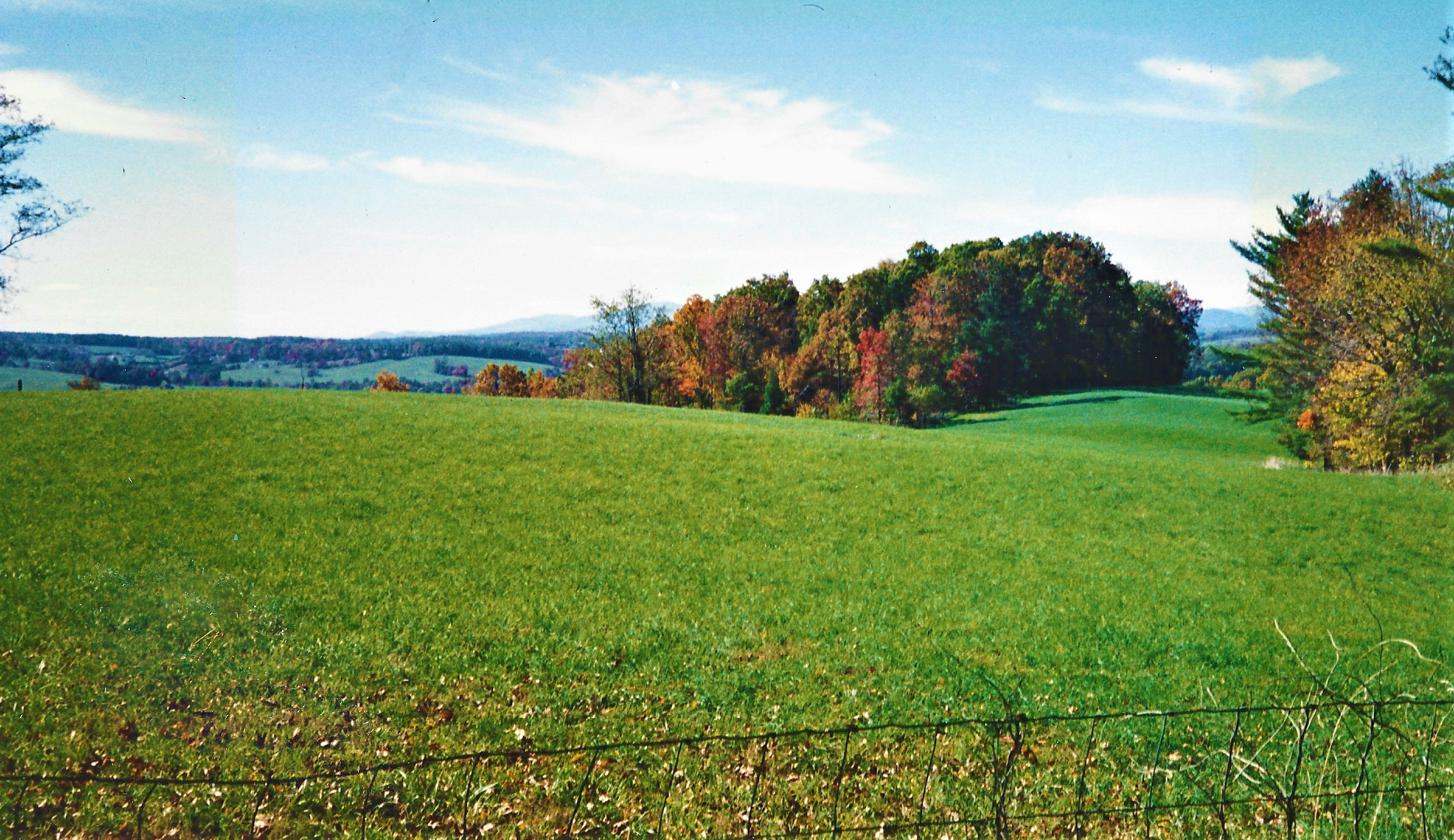
Autumn meadow scene near Woodlawn, Virginia. Elevation 2,520 ft (768 m).

The Treaty of Lochaber, between British representative John Stuart (loyalist) and the Cherokee, made the land available for settlement about 1770. The original James Wood willed the land to his wife Mary who willed it to her grandsons. It is thought that none of the Wood family ever lived in Woodlawn.

In the later years students at Woodlawn High School came from five main feeder schools—from the west they came from Gladeville Elementary and from the southwest Oakland Elementary. Both schools were located near Galax, Virginia. Students also came from Woodlawn Elementary, Vaughn Elementary near Fries, Virginia and from Laurel Elementary to the north.

== Staff ==
Professor George Ivy served as principal of the Woodlawn Male and Female Academy. Everett E. Worrell was the first principal of the Normal School, followed by F. H. Combs and C.C. Carr.

E.J. Cooley served as the first principal of Woodlawn High School. In 1906, the Virginia General Assembly passed the Mann High School Act establishing the first high schools in the state. WHS principals following Cooley were: S.A. McDonald, Zelma Kyle, B.M. Cox, B. M Wright, P.W. Jones, Foy E. DeHaven, R. S. Gardner, Paul Cox, James Combs and F. S. DeVault.

Zelma Kyle served as president of the Virginia Education Association from 1946–1948. He also served as the assistant supervisor of secondary education for the Virginia Department of Education from 1946 until his retirement in 1963.

== First Senior Trip ==
The first full four-year graduates of WHS received their diplomas in June 1910. Fourteen students walked across the stage at that ceremony. After graduation, class members, several faculty members and administrators boarded a chartered coach on the Norfolk and Western railroad for a tour of Virginia. Stops included Roanoke, Lynchburg, Richmond and Norfolk. From Norfolk they sailed the Chesapeake Bay to Baltimore then traveled to Washington, D.C., touring the city for several days. The group returned by way of Monticello and the University of Virginia. The entire trip took fifteen days.

== Band ==
The Woodlawn High School Marching Raiders Band was founded in 1962. The band performed in numerous area and national parades, at special events, concerts, festivals, state and regional competitions, WHS football games and band days at Virginia Tech and the University of Virginia. Each school year was capped off with the band's year end celebration—a picnic along with time for fun and games at Cumberland Knob Park on the Blue Ridge Parkway.

Jerry Liles served as the high school's first and only full-time band director. He continued at the intermediate school after the high school was consolidated into Carroll County High School (Virginia).

== Athletics ==
Woodlawn Male and Female Academy had a well rounded athletic program including baseball, football, tennis and track. Football was later dropped as a sport but returned in the fall of 1967. As a high school, Woodlawn produced some outstanding basketball teams during the mid-to-late 1960s but it was baseball that became the Raiders most prominent sport.

Former WHS baseball player, Yancey Wyatt Doc Ayers went on to become a successful major league baseball pitcher for the Washington Senators and Detroit Tigers. He gained the nickname "Doc" after he enrolled in the Medical College of Virginia, now the medical campus of Virginia Commonwealth University, in Richmond. While at MCV, he bought a book on pitching. He was a catcher at WHS but when the call came for college baseball tryouts he reported as a pitcher.

In 1964 the school’s baseball team began a streak of forty-one consecutive victories stretching into the 1967 season. During this streak on April 21, 1966, pitcher Harry Isom recorded a seven inning (standard for high school) perfect game. Isom not only pitched a perfect game but also struck out all twenty-one batters he faced. As of April 2016, the feat had never been duplicated in 100 years of Virginia High School League (VHSL) baseball. The story was picked up by the Associated Press and sent to newspapers and other media outlets across the country.
