= Laurel Fork, Virginia =

- Unincorporated community
- Location within Virginia Location within the United States
- Coordinates: 36°43′03″N 80°31′07″W
- Country: United States
- State: Virginia
- County: Carroll
- Elevation: 2,766 ft (843 m)
- Time zone: UTC-5 (Eastern (EST))
  - Summer (DST): UTC-4 (EDT)
- ZIP code: 24352
- Area code: 276
- GNIS feature ID: 1477476

Laurel Fork is an unincorporated community in Carroll County, Virginia, United States. It is located off U.S. Route 58 and is 12.4 miles (20.0 km) east-southeast of Hillsville. Laurel Fork has a post office with the ZIP code 24352.

Before the town was known as Laurel Fork, it was called Bolt Town, named after a Doctor Bolt and his numerous family members who originally inhabited the town. Then consisting of Sam Bolt's store, a post office, and a few farms, Bolt Town was nicknamed "Little Cincinnati" because of the perceived superior attitude of its residents. Eventually, the community took its name from the Laurel Fork Creek that winds through the hills nearby, which in turn was named after the native Rhododendron. Early English settlers, not knowing the Rhododendron's name, called it "laurel" after the shrubs they knew from England.

Late nineteenth-century census records show that 60 percent of the Laurel Fork population could read and write. Around 1903 - 1904, the Laurel Fork Male and Female Academy was built, later becoming a high school. Businesses including a printing shop, a short-lived motor company, the Laurel Fork Bank, Midway Hotel and Restaurant, Laurel Fork Mercantile, Puckett's Grocery and Garage, as well as the Laurel Fork Telephone Company were also established. Laurel Fork reportedly had the first airport in the county.

Among Laurel Fork's surviving historical landmarks is the Laurel Fork Primitive Baptist Church, founded in 1846, making it the oldest church in Laurel Fork and one of the oldest in Carroll County. The church was a daughter church of New Hope Primitive Baptist. The church, as well as a school next to it, were burned down and then rebuilt in 1876 on land given by Mr. and Mrs. Reuben Nester. In 1970, the church was encased in brick and now stands along Laurel Fork Road. Located next to the church is the former Point Pleasant School. Constructed in 1911, this one-room schoolhouse is commonly believed to be the descendant of the first school in Laurel Fork, which had previously burned down. Point Pleasant School closed its doors in 1948. In September 2007, the school was placed on the Virginia Landmarks Register. In October 2007, Point Pleasant School was placed on the National Register of Historic Places.
