= Carroll County High School (Virginia) =

Location
- 100 Cavs Lane; Hillsville, Virginia 24343; United States
- Coordinates: 36°45′17.28″N 80°42′16.2″W

Information
- School type: Public, high school
- Founded: 1969
- School district: Carroll County Public Schools
- Superintendent: Dwayne Huff
- Principal: Charles Thompson
- Grades: 9-12
- Enrollment: 1,156 (2016-17)
- Language: English
- Colors: Navy & White
- Athletics conference: 4A Three Rivers District; Region IV
- Mascot: Cavalier
- Website: https://www.cchs.ccpsd.k12.va.us/

Carroll County High School is located in Carroll County, Virginia, just outside the Hillsville town limits. Carroll County High School is a four-year, public, comprehensive high school with a full range of curriculum offerings in academic and vocational subjects. The 2009 enrollment of Carroll County High School was 1158 students. The school was founded in 1969 for the consolidation of Woodlawn High School and Hillsville High School.

The school offers dual enrollment courses which allows high school students to earn college credit while taking high school classes, and in some cases they can graduate with an associate’s degree. The school’s girls basketball team won the state championship for their region two times in a row in the 2021-2022, 2022-2023 school year.

The school was renovated in 2013 to include a new entrance known as the “fish bowl” with a new office suite, library and an addition to the school's field house. The school has finished a new project which added an auxiliary gym, four classrooms and locker rooms. This also connected the school's field house building allowing students to no longer walk outside. The project was completed around spring of 2024.
