= Snake Creek Farm Historic District =

Historic district in Virginia, United States

- U.S. National Register of Historic Places
- U.S. Historic district
- Virginia Landmarks Register
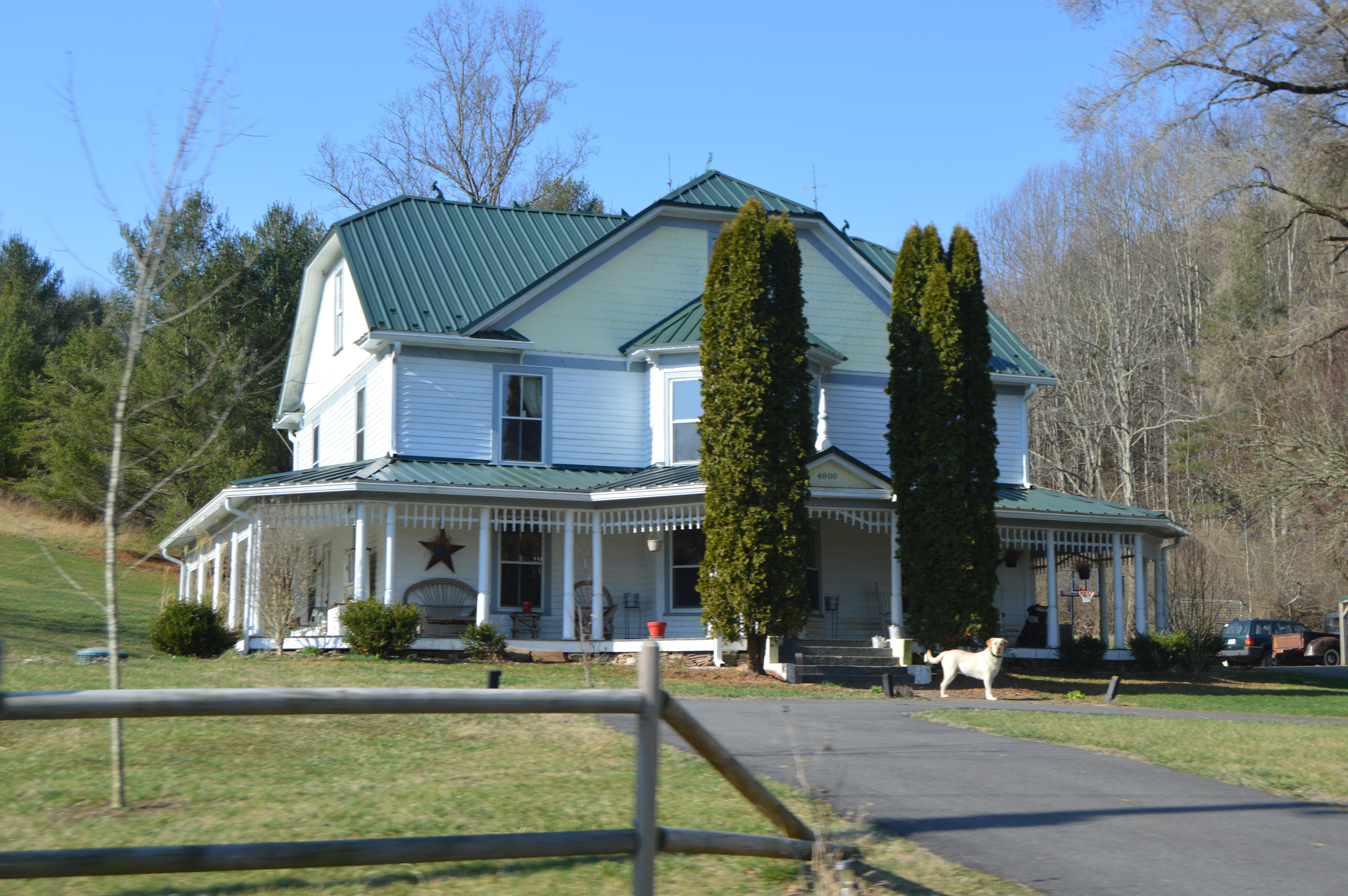
- Roadside view of the farmhouse

- Location within Virginia Location within the United States
- Location: VA 670 S of jct. with VA 674, Hillsville, Virginia
- Coordinates: 36°42′52″N 80°38′52″W
- Area: 9.5 acres (3.8 ha)
- Architectural style: Double-pile center-passage
- NRHP reference No.: 90002138
- VLR No.: 017-0008

Significant dates
- Added to NRHP: January 11, 1991
- Designated VLR: August 21, 1990

Snake Creek Farm Historic District is a national historic district near Hillsville, Virginia. The district encompasses four contributing buildings and one contributing site on Snake Creek Farm. They include the main house, a frame spring house and meathouse, and a frame two-room schoolhouse. Also on the property is a large family cemetery. The main house was built about 1910, and is a 2½-story, double-pile, center-passage-plan frame dwelling.

It was listed on the National Register of Historic Places in 1991.
