= Woodlawn, Carroll County, Virginia =

Woodlawn, Virginia
- CDP
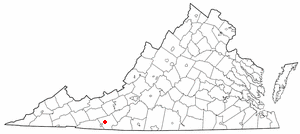
- Location of Woodlawn, Virginia
- Coordinates: 36°43′58″N 80°48′7″W
- Country: United States
- State: Virginia
- County: Carroll

Area
  - Total: 19.5 sq mi (50.6 km^{2})
  - Land: 19.5 sq mi (50.6 km^{2})
  - Water: 0 sq mi (0.0 km^{2})
- Elevation: 2,520 ft (768 m)

Population (2010)
  - Total: 2,343
  - Density: 120/sq mi (46.3/km^{2})
- Time zone: UTC−5 (Eastern (EST))
  - Summer (DST): UTC−4 (EDT)
- ZIP code: 24381
- Area code: 276
- FIPS code: 51-87408
- GNIS feature ID: 1476952

Woodlawn is a census-designated place (CDP) in Carroll County, Virginia, United States. The population was 2,045 at the 2020 census.

== History ==
The area of present-day Woodlawn, located in Virginia's Blue Ridge Mountains, began as a land grant to James Wood of Frederick County in 1756. His son, James Wood, served as governor of Virginia from 1796 to 1799. The Treaty of Lochaber, between British representative John Stuart and the Cherokee, made the land available for settlement circa 1770. The original James Wood bequeathed the land to his wife Mary, who bequeathed it to her grandsons. It is thought that none of the Wood family ever lived in Woodlawn.

== Geography ==
Woodlawn is located at 36°43′58″N 80°48′7″W (36.732719, −80.801934).

According to the United States Census Bureau, the CDP has a total area of 19.5 square miles (50.6 km^{2}), all land.

== Demographics ==
Historical population
Census	Pop.	Note	%±
2000	2,249		—
2010	2,343		4.2%
2020	2,045		−12.7%
U.S. Decennial Census; 2000 2010 2020

Woodlawn was first listed as a census designated place in the 2000 U.S. census.

As of the census of 2000, there were 2,249 people, 847 households, and 597 families residing in the CDP. The population density was 115.1 people per square mile (44.4/km^{2}). There were 926 housing units at an average density of 47.4/sq mi (18.3/km^{2}). The racial makeup of the CDP was 98.58% White, 0.49% African American, 0.27% Native American, 0.09% Asian, 0.36% from other races, and 0.22% from two or more races. Hispanic or Latino of any race were 0.93% of the population.

There were 847 households, out of which 25.9% had children under the age of 18 living with them, 58.1% were married couples living together, 8.3% had a female householder with no husband present, and 29.5% were non-families. 27.0% of all households were made up of individuals, and 11.7% had someone living alone who was 65 years of age or older. The average household size was 2.31 and the average family size was 2.77.

In the CDP, the population was spread out, with 19.5% under the age of 18, 7.4% from 18 to 24, 30.2% from 25 to 44, 28.4% from 45 to 64, and 14.5% who were 65 years of age or older. The median age was 41 years. For every 100 females, there were 103.9 males. For every 100 females age 18 and over, there were 100.9 males.

The median income for a household in the CDP was $34,044, and the median income for a family was $38,750. Males had a median income of $24,942 versus $18,991 for females. The per capita income for the CDP was $16,494. About 4.4% of families and 13.0% of the population were below the poverty line, including 15.2% of those under age 18 and 16.6% of those age 65 or over.

== Notable sites ==
Woodlawn is home to the Harmon's Museum, where visitors can see the two headed calf and a large collection of arrow heads and Native American artifacts. A collection of items from the Baldwin-Felts Detective Agency is also housed at the museum.

Woodlawn is the site of the former Woodlawn High School. The school was the first public high school in Carroll County and was among the earliest in Virginia. In 1914 it became the first public secondary school in the United States to offer agricultural education classes under the Smith-Hughes Act. The original building that housed the agriculture department still stands. The school was placed on the Virginia Landmarks Register September 20, 2018. and the U.S. National Register of Historic Places January 17, 2019.

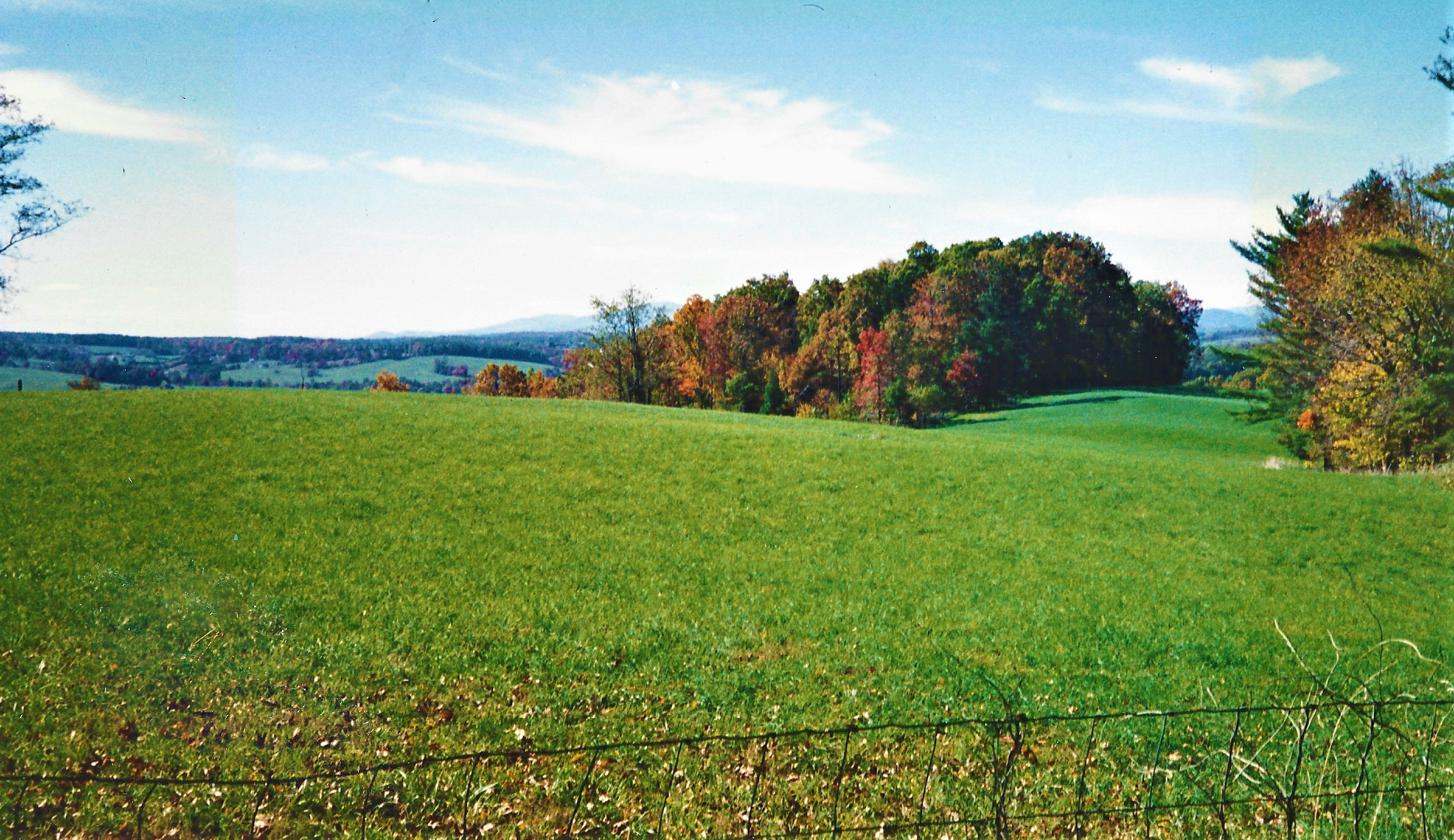
Autumn meadow scene near Woodlawn. Elevation 2,520 ft (768 m).

The Crooked Creek Wildlife Management Area is located just outside of Woodlawn. This area includes over 1,600 acres of mountain land with six miles of stocked trout streams providing opportunities for fishing, hunting, hiking, wildflower photography and wildlife watching.

The Blue Ridge Parkway is about seven miles from Woodlawn via back roads with the picturesque Mabry Mill located at milepost 176.2 about twenty-five miles away. The Blue Ridge Music Center featuring a concert center, mountain music museum and visitor center is at milepost 213 about ten miles from Woodlawn.

The New River Trail State Park ideal for hiking and biking is about six miles from Woodlawn. Grayson Highlands State Park featuring scenic views, waterfalls, hiking to the summit of Mount Rogers, the Appalachian Trail and wild mountain ponies is about fifty miles west near the Mount Rogers National Recreation Area.
