= Floyd Allen =

American mass murderer (1856–1913)

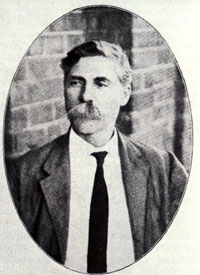
- Portrait of Floyd Allen
- Born: July 5, 1856; Carroll County, Virginia, U.S.
- Died: March 28, 1913 (aged 56); Virginia State Penitentiary, Virginia, U.S.
- Status: Executed by electrocution
- Convictions: First degree murder Assault
- Penalty: Death

Floyd Allen (July 5, 1856 – March 28, 1913) was an American landowner and patriarch of the Allen clan of Carroll County, Virginia. He was convicted and executed for murder in 1913 after a notorious courthouse shootout the previous year that left a judge, prosecutor, sheriff, and three others dead, although the validity of the conviction has been a source of debate within Carroll County for decades. Allen, who was before the bar for sentencing after being convicted of taking a prisoner from a deputy sheriff, allegedly triggered the shooting at the Carroll County Courthouse in Hillsville on March 14, 1912.

== Early life and activities ==
Floyd Allen was born in 1856 and spent much of his life living in Cana, Virginia, located below Fancy Gap Mountain in Carroll County. He was the patriarch of the county's most prominent family, which, in addition to owning large tracts of farmland and a prosperous general store, were also active in local politics as proud Southern Democrats. Both Allen and his brother Sidna held legal licenses for the production of alcohol.

Allen was noted for his generosity, but also his quick temper and easily injured pride. He had a history of violent altercations, including killing a black man who was supposedly hunting on his property in North Carolina, beating a police officer in Mount Airy and later shooting his own cousin. In May 1889, Floyd's brothers, Garland and Sidna Allen, were tried for carrying concealed pistols and assaulting a group of thirteen men. In July 1889, the Carroll County court indicted Floyd for assault as well, but in December of that year the Commonwealth's Attorney dropped the case. In September 1889, after pleading no contest to the assault, Garland and Sidna were fined $5 each plus court costs, and the prosecutor dropped the weapons charges.

Judge Robert C. Jackson, an attorney in Roanoke and Judge Thornton Massie's predecessor in the Carroll County courtroom, stated that, "Floyd Allen was perhaps the worst man of the clan – overbearing, vindictive, high tempered, brutal, with no respect for law and little or no regard for human life. During my term of office Floyd Allen was several times charged with violations of law. In several instances he escaped indictment, I am satisfied, because the witnesses were afraid to testify to the facts before the grand jury."

Judge Jackson recalled a trial in 1904 in which Allen was convicted of assaulting a neighbor, Noah Combs. Floyd had wanted to buy a farm owned by one of his own brothers, but could not agree on a price. Combs wanted the land badly enough to pay the asking price and bought it despite Floyd Allen's warnings not to "butt in." Not long afterward, Allen shot and wounded Combs, and was indicted and tried on charges of assault. Sentenced by the jury to an hour in jail and a $100 fine, plus costs, Allen immediately posted bail pending an appeal. His defense team included former Commonwealth's Attorney Walter Tipton and recent County Court Judge Oglesby. At the next term of court, Allen produced an order of clemency from Governor Andrew J. Montague suspending the jail sentence.

In another instance, while arguing over the administration of their father's estate, Allen got into a gunfight with his own brother, Jasper, known as "Jack", a local constable. In a fusillade of shots, Allen hit Jack in the head, which struck a glancing blow on Jack's scalp, while one of Jack's bullets hit Allen in the chest. His pistol empty, Allen proceeded to beat Jack with the butt of his empty revolver. Sentenced to a $100 fine and one hour in jail for wounding Jack, Floyd refused to go, saying that he "would never spend a minute in jail as long as the blood flowed through his veins". Floyd's body bore the scars of thirteen bullet wounds, five of them inflicted in quarrels with his own family.

Despite their history of violence, the Allens held considerable political power, and Allen had a reputation for courage. In 1908, while serving as special deputies, Allen and a relative, Henry "H.C." Allen, were charged with unlawful assault upon prisoners held in their custody who they claimed had resisted arrest. On February 1, 1908, the Allens were convicted of the charge and sentenced to ten days in jail and a fine of $10. Only a month later, their petition for executive clemency was granted by Governor Claude A. Swanson, restoring their political rights to hold office.

In 1910, Sidna Allen was tried in the United States court at Greensboro, North Carolina for making twenty-dollar counterfeit coins. The federal court in Greensboro found him not guilty, while Sidna's alleged accomplice, Preston Dickens, was found guilty and sentenced to serve five years in federal prison. Sidna was retried and found guilty of perjury in his trial testimony, and was sentenced to two years' imprisonment. Sidna promptly appealed and won a new trial on the perjury charge. The next year, after the Allens complained that they could not expect justice from William Foster, the Republican Commonwealth Attorney of the county (who had recently switched parties), Judge Thornton L. Massie appointed both Floyd and H.C. as police officers for the New River section of the county.

However, times were changing: Virginia's judicial structure was altered in a series of legal reforms, particularly the county court system, which was replaced by circuit courts. The new system appointed a full-time judge to hold court at scheduled intervals in a circuit of several counties. While the state legislature still appointed circuit judges, the new system reduced the ability of individual delegates to ensure that their preferred judge was selected for their particular county; furthermore, judges could no longer practice law for private clients while on the bench, and as regional judges their susceptibility to local influence and public opinion was reduced.

== Arrest of the Edwards brothers ==
One night in December 1910 (some sources say 1911), two of Floyd Allen's nephews, Wesley and Sidna Edwards, attended a corn shucking bee in Hillsville. While there, Wesley kissed a girl who was romantically linked to a local youth, Will Thomas, which led to an altercation between the two young men. At a church service the next morning conducted by Wesley's uncle, Garland Allen, Thomas reportedly called out Wesley into a fight. According to Wesley, Thomas and three friends assaulted him, and he defended himself with the help of his brother Sidna, who rushed to join the fight. Wesley and Sidna were charged with disorderly conduct, assault with a deadly weapon, disturbing a public worship service, and other violations. Rather than face arrest, the two men fled over the state line to North Carolina, where they found jobs in a granite quarry. The deputy clerk of Carroll County, Dexter Goad, obtained a new warrant for the brothers' arrest, notifying the sheriff in Surry County, North Carolina, who soon arrested both men.

A Carroll County deputy sheriff, Thomas Samuels, and his driver, Peter Easter, traveled in Easter's four-seater buggy to the state line and received the brothers from Sheriff Haynes and Deputy Oscar Monday, who had arrested the brothers at work. There was only one set of handcuffs, and because Sidna Edwards had tried to escape a couple of times, Wesley was handcuffed in the front seat of the buggy and Sidna was tied in the back seat. On the way to the courthouse, the buggy passed by several properties owned by the Allens.

Floyd Allen met the buggy south of Sidna Allen's home as he was on the way to his own home. Deputy Samuels pulled a gun (later determined to be inoperative) and ordered Floyd to move away, and Floyd rode back past the buggy to Sidna's store where he then blocked the narrow road with his mare. Samuels again pulled his gun on Floyd. A fight ensued and Floyd beat Samuels with his own pistol. Wesley Edwards tried to grapple with Easter, but Easter got away and fired a shot at Floyd as he did so, wounding Floyd in the finger. Floyd then released the Edwards brothers. Easter ran to an acquaintance's home, and he telephoned the sheriff at Hillsville.

Deputy Samuels was left lying unconscious in a ditch, and his horses were run off. Floyd Allen later stated that he never intended to have the boys set completely free, he just wanted them to be released from their manacles.

On the following Monday, Wesley and Sidna Edwards were turned over to the court by Floyd Allen, and the two Edwards brothers were soon tried and convicted of their crimes. Wesley was sentenced to sixty days and his brother thirty, which were served outside jail on work-release.

== Indictment ==
The Commonwealth's attorney, William Foster had served as Carroll County's prosecutor for eight years, having been first elected on the Democratic ticket. Later, Foster changed to the Republican party, and by 1912 was a prominent leader in the GOP in Carroll County, being elected the last time on the Republican ticket. Foster was a political enemy of the Allens, who had supported Jack Allen's son, Walter, as Democratic candidate for Commonwealth's Attorney against Foster in the last election. (Walter Allen had lost the bitterly fought race.)

Foster called upon a grand jury to investigate the escape/pistol-whipping incident. Floyd Allen agreed to testify and admitted 'roughing up' Samuels, but denied intending to release the prisoners: "That there Samuel[s] was abusing the boys. He had them handcuffed and tied up with a rope. I just can't bear to see anyone drug around."

Nonetheless, the grand jury indicted Floyd Allen, Sidna Allen and Barnett Allen for interfering with the deputies, and Floyd Allen was also indicted for assault and battery upon Samuels. Sidna Allen was never tried for his part in the altercation, while Barnett Allen was acquitted at trial.

When Floyd Allen's case was set for trial, rumors arose that he had sent word to Deputy Samuels that he would kill Samuels if the deputy testified against him. Allen later denied this, but the reported threat caused Samuels to leave the state the same night it was delivered.

The rumor that the Allens were intimidating witnesses was called to the attention of the court. Judge Thornton L. Massie called Constable Jack Allen (and Floyd Allen, who had been deputized by Massie about six months earlier) to the bar and proceeded to question them about the alleged intimidation. Jack Allen denied all responsibility for the allegations of intimidation, which he stated were untrue and insisted neither he nor his brother was guilty of wrongdoing. In response, the judge told the two men that if the law could not be faithfully enforced in Carroll County by the county's deputized officers he would bring in state troops if necessary to maintain order. A witness later testified that Floyd Allen had remarked that he "would not let any man talk to me that way."

== Trial and shooting ==
After close to a year of delays, Floyd was finally brought to trial on March 13, 1912. Judge Thornton L. Massie, who had deputized Floyd six months earlier, presided. Floyd Allen was well represented by a two-attorney team. Both, Walter Scott Tipton and David Winton Bolen, were retired Carroll County judges.

Samuels' departure forced Commonwealth's Attorney William M. Foster to rely on testimony from Deputy Easter. The jury could not agree on a verdict immediately as the trial ended, and were sequestered in a local hotel overnight.

Fearful of the Allens' reaction, and having received death threats, many officials of the court armed themselves. At least two of the participants, Judge Massie and Sheriff Webb, had told friends that they expected trouble. Many of the Allen clan members were spectators in the courtroom, most of them armed with pistols. Sidna Allen and Claude Allen stood on benches in the courtroom's northeast corner to see over the crowd. Friel Allen sat in the back of the room, and the Edwards boys stood on benches next to the north wall. When the jury returned a guilty verdict against with a sentence of one year in the penitentiary, Floyd Allen is reported to have said to Judge Massie: "If you sentence me on that verdict, I will kill you." The judge immediately sentenced Floyd Allen to one year's imprisonment.

According to Floyd Allen's defense attorney, David Winton Bolen, "[Floyd] hesitated a moment, and then he arose...He looked to me like a man who was about to say something, and had hardly made up his mind what he was going to say, but as he got straight, he moved off to my left, I would say five or six feet, and he seemed to gain his speech, and he said something like this, 'I just tell you, I ain't a'going.'" At this point, shots broke out in the courtroom.

Accounts differ as to who actually fired the first shot. Many accounts claim that Allen initiated the confrontation by pulling a gun in court. In his defense testimony, Floyd Allen stated that Sheriff Lew F. Webb fired first, but that the shot missed Allen, at which point Deputy Clerk Goad, the Clerk of Court, fired and hit Allen, causing him to fall. (When Floyd fell, wounded, he landed on top of his lawyer David Bolen, who had ducked to the ground as soon as the shooting started, and who is reported to have said, "Floyd, they are going to kill me shooting at you!") Floyd Allen stated that only then did he draw his own revolver and begin shooting. After a fusillade of shots, the Allen clan left the courthouse, armed with pistols and 12-gauge pump shotguns and shooting as they ran.

Judge Massie, Sheriff Webb, Commonwealth's Attorney Foster, and the jury foreman (Augustus C. Fowler), were all hit and died of their wounds sustained in the crossfire. More than fifty bullets were later recovered from the shooting scene. Elizabeth Ayers, a 19-year-old subpoenaed witness who had testified against Floyd Allen, was shot in the back while trying to leave the courtroom, and died at home the next day.

Seven others were wounded, including Deputy Clerk Goad and Floyd Allen. Floyd, wounded too badly in the hip, thigh and knee to leave town, instead spent the night in the Elliott Hotel accompanied by his eldest son, Victor, who was later acquitted of involvement in the shootout. Upon his arrest by deputies at the hotel, Floyd attempted to slash his own throat with a pocketknife, but was overpowered before he could complete the job.

== Manhunt ==
Virginia law held that when a sheriff died his deputies lost all legal powers, so the shooting left Carroll County without law enforcement. Recognizing the need for immediate action, assistant clerk S. Floyd Landreth sent a telegram to Democratic Governor William Hodges Mann which read:

Send troops to the County of Carroll at once. Mob violence, the court. Commonwealth's Attorney, Sheriff, some jurors and others shot on the conviction of Floyd Allen for a felony. Sheriff and Commonwealth's Attorney dead, court serious. Look after this now.

Governor Mann immediately called on the Baldwin-Felts Detective Agency to find those responsible for the shootings and arrest them. The Commonwealth of Virginia posted rewards ($1000 for Sidna Allen, $1000 for Sidna Edwards, $800 for Claude Allen, $500 for Friel Allen, and $500 for Wesley Edwards) - dead or alive.

Within a month, all suspected shooters were in custody, except Sidna Allen and Wesley Edwards. During the initial manhunt, several posses of detectives and local deputies searched the surrounding countryside. Friel Allen gave himself up to detectives in the company of his father, Jack Allen, who worried his son might be killed while being apprehended.

Cousins Claude Allen and Sidna Edwards were soon arrested after a brief search. The U.S. Revenue Service had sent Deputy Agent Faddis to investigate reports of illegal liquor trafficking by the Allens. Agent Faddis and four men raided Floyd Allen's property, seizing illegal stills and fifty gallons of moonshine. Two more illegal stills were found at Sidna Edwards' house. However, Sidna Allen and his nephew, Wesley Edwards, fled Virginia. After several months' chase, Baldwin-Felts detectives located them in Iowa after an informant's tip. Sidna Allen maintained until the end of his life that this informant was Maude Iroller, Wesley's fiancée, who provided information on the fugitives' location in exchange for $500 from the detective agency. Others state that Miss Iroller's father, who had never approved of his daughter's romance with Wesley Edwards, tipped off the detectives that Maude was going to Des Moines to marry him. Baldwin-Felts detectives traveled to Des Moines, arrested the suspects, and returned them to Carroll County to stand trial.

== Trials for the courthouse shooting ==
Floyd Allen was the first to be brought to trial on a charge of murdering Judge Massie, Sheriff Webb, and Commonwealth's Attorney Foster. Judge W. R. Staples presided over the courthouse shooting trials, which were prosecuted by Assistant Attorney General Samuel W. Williams and involved attorneys Draper, Landreth, Poage and Wysor. No autopsies were ever performed and rumors flew of friendly fire casualties.

The prosecutor's case was based on the formation of a conspiracy by the Allens to kill the trial judge, local law enforcement, and others who had wronged them in the event of a guilty verdict. J. E. Kearn, a traveling salesman from Roanoke, testified he sold Sidna Allen a lot of ammunition at the March term of the Hillsville court, specifically 500 each of .32 and .38 caliber pistol cartridges and 500 12-gauge shotgun shells.

The prosecution attempted to show that Floyd and Claude Allen prompted the gun battle by standing and pulling their pistols and opening fire. Former judge David Winton Bolen, who had been present during the shooting as one of Floyd Allen's defense attorneys, was the first witness the prosecution called at Floyd Allen's murder trial. Bolen had been standing next to Floyd Allen, and was facing Judge Massie when the first shots struck the judge's robes. Bolen testified that Claude Allen fired the first shot, and that Claude Allen's pistol shot, together with a second shot fired by Sidna Allen, killed Judge Massie.

Another prosecution witness was Floyd Allen's other attorney, Walter S. Tipton. Tipton testified he saw Claude Allen in the courthouse with a pistol raised in both hands as if he had just fired it. During a second glance Tipton again saw Floyd with his pistol raised and held in both hands; he then saw Floyd Allen fire his pistol.

Yet another lawyer who witnessed the shooting, W. A. Daugherty of Pikeville, stated that several young men were standing on court benches at the back of the room firing their pistols "like Custer's cavalrymen at the Little Big Horn".

Deputy Sheriff George W. Edwards, who became the sheriff of Carroll County after Sheriff Webb's death, testified that, as a deputy sheriff at the time, he had spoken with Floyd Allen just after Allen learned of his indictment. Floyd said that Commonwealth's Attorney Foster would not give him a show; but that if he did not there would be a "big hole put in the court house." The next witness was Sidney Towe, who largely corroborated the testimony of Sheriff Edwards. On a different occasion, he heard Floyd Allen make the same threat of putting the biggest hole in the courthouse that any man ever had seen.

On the other hand, Floyd Allen and his relatives claimed Deputy Clerk Dexter Goad had fired first, prompted by a long-standing vendetta he and Foster held against the Allen family. The defense attempted to show that Deputy Clerk Goad shot Elizabeth Ayers in his exchange of fire with the Allens, a charge Goad denied. Years later, an allegation surfaced that Deputy Clerk H.C. Quesinberry had confessed on his deathbed to starting the shooting; two men swore an affidavit to that effect in 1967 (for which each man was reportedly paid $25). Others consider the alleged affidavit to be hearsay, made years after the event transpired, and worthless.

In his testimony at his murder trial, Floyd Allen admitted he had fired at Deputy Clerk Quesinberry and again twice more at other unknown persons once he had left the courthouse.

Deputy Clerk Dexter Goad admitted firing the second shot at Floyd, striking him in the pelvis. He said he thought Floyd's fumbling with his sweater buttons was a prelude to drawing his pistol. However, Goad denied firing the first shot in the fusillade. Though wounded by four bullets himself, Goad recovered.

S. E. Gardner, a Hillsville undertaker who prepared the body of Sheriff Webb for burial, testified that the Sheriff was shot no less than five times. One bullet entered the back and ranged upward, lodging directly under the collarbone. A second shot entered the back about four inches lower, while a third shot cut the sheriff across the chin. Another entered the body at the cap of the left hip and passed through the abdomen. The last and fifth shot went into the calf of the leg and when his trousers were removed, a .32 caliber bullet was discovered. Attorney Howard C. Gilmer, of Pulaski, Virginia, was at Hillsville Courthouse in a room adjoining Judge Massie's courtroom when the shooting broke out. Gilmer testified he heard two shots in quick succession, after which there was a slight interval and then a great volley of firing. He also testified that he saw the crowd come out of the court house, and recognized Floyd and Sidna Allen as the last to leave, both of them following and firing as they backed out, apparently in response to fire coming from within the courthouse. The last two bullets were fired by Floyd and went through two of the steps of one of the courthouse's stairways, where they can still be viewed today. Gilmer said he heard Floyd Allen say two or three times, "I am shot, but I got the damn scoundrel."

County Treasurer J. B. Marshall testified that when the shooting started he turned to escape the courthouse. After getting down the steps he leaned against the window of his office when two girls, Dora and Elizabeth Ayers, passed him. He testified that one of the girls pointed out some of the Allens leaving the courthouse, when Sidna Allen came toward him, pointed his pistol at him, and fired. Marshall then related that Sidna Allen's bullet buried itself in the window about six inches above his head. Marshall also testified he had been standing near Sheriff Webb, but did not see any pistol in the Sheriff's hand.

Another witness, Walter Petty, also testified that the first shots were fired from the courtroom's northeast corner, where Claude Allen was standing. Petty also witnessed a pistol duel between Sidna Allen and Deputy Clerk Dexter Goad.

At Claude Allen's trial for the murder of Commonwealth's Attorney Foster, Judge David W. Bolen was again the prosecution's star witness. Judge Bolen confirmed his prior testimony that he saw Claude Allen fire the first shot at Judge Massie from the courtroom's northeast corner, whereupon Claude advanced toward the court officers to where Commonwealth's Attorney Foster was standing.

For his part, Claude Allen admitted to firing his pistol while in the courtroom. He testified that he saw Sidna Allen firing just about the time he saw Deputy Clerk Goad fire.

Victor Allen, whose pistol was used in the courthouse shooting, said he saw Wesley Edwards from outside the courtroom firing a revolver through the courthouse window and over spectators' heads just after the shooting began, and later saw Edwards run from the courthouse together with Sidna Allen. Victor Allen also asserted that Claude had taken Victor's handgun as the two left their hotel in Hillsville on that morning.

Sidna Edwards testified that he was not armed on the day of the shooting and that he did not like to carry guns. He denied firing a gun during the courthouse shootings, and stated that he did not see who fired the first shot, but thought that it came from the vicinity of Deputy Clerk Goad's desk. Sidna Edwards had scalded his foot some years before and was partially lame, and limped out of the courthouse, riding his mother's horse back to his home.

Sidna Allen denied that he shot Judge Massie, or that he fired at Commonwealth's Attorney Foster, Sheriff Webb, or at Juror Fowler. Allen claimed that when the shooting began, he drew his own revolver and fired five times at Deputy Clerk Goad and Deputy Sheriff Gillespie, because both men were firing at him. After those five shots, he dropped to his knees and reloaded his revolver. Sidna Allen claimed that when he left the courthouse, Goad followed behind him, shooting him through the left arm, the bullet lodging in his left side. He stated that he fired back at Goad on the courthouse steps, but denied shooting at Treasurer J. B. Marshall. He also said he went to Blankenship's Livery Stable after the incident, where he met other family members and left Hillsville with Claude Allen, Wesley Edwards, and Sidna Edwards. They returned to their homes by traveling cross-country through the farm fields rather than public roads. Sidna Allen and Wesley Edwards then left Virginia, eventually reaching Des Moines, Iowa.

== Aftermath ==
Floyd Allen was tried for the first degree murder of Commonwealth's Attorney Foster. On May 18, 1912, the jury found Floyd Allen guilty. He wept freely as the verdict was read. In July 1912, after three separate trials, Claude Allen was convicted of first degree murder for the killing of Commonwealth's Attorney Foster, and for second degree murder for the killing of Judge Massie.

For their roles in the shooting, Floyd and Claude were sentenced to death by electrocution. Allen's death sentence was deeply unpopular with Allen supporters in the county, but many other residents were unsympathetic, surprised by the deaths of so many people over Floyd Allen's refusal to serve a year in prison. Governor Mann, who had received death threats in the same handwriting as the threats previously delivered to the trial judge, had to cut short a trip to Pennsylvania after learning his Lieutenant Governor, James Taylor Ellyson (1847–1919), had attempted to commute the Allens' sentences in his absence, instigating a brief constitutional power struggle between the two men. Governor Mann refused a request to commute the death sentences to life imprisonment, and Floyd Allen was electrocuted on March 28, 1913, at 1:20PM. Eleven minutes later, his son, Claude, followed his father to death in the electric chair.

Sidna Allen pleaded guilty and received a total of 35 years in prison for the voluntary manslaughter of Commonwealth's Attorney Foster, and for second degree murder of Judge Massie. He also pleaded guilty to second degree murder for the shooting of Sheriff Webb, and was sentenced to 18 years' imprisonment. Wesley Edwards drew nine years for each count of murder for the slaying of Foster, Massie, and Webb for a total of 27 years' imprisonment. Sidna Edwards pleaded guilty in August 1912 to second degree murder, and was sentenced to 15 years in the penitentiary. Friel Allen was tried in August 1912 and after confessing to shooting prosecutor Foster, was sentenced to 18 years in prison. Democratic Governor Elbert Lee Trinkle pardoned Friel Allen and Sidna Edwards in 1922. In April 1926, Governor Harry Flood Byrd pardoned Sidna Allen and Wesley Edwards.

Victor Allen and Barnett Allen were acquitted. Burden "Byrd" Marion, a cousin and neighbor who'd reloaded a revolver for one of the Allens, had all charges against him dropped. Accounts differ as to whether this was for a lack of evidence, or since Marion became a state's witness and admitted his role in aiding the Allens. Shortly after the Allen trials, law enforcement officers found a still in an old house on Burden Marion's farm, and he was arrested for making illegal liquor. He was tried in federal court, found guilty, and sentenced to a year in federal prison at Moundsville, West Virginia. He began his sentence in August 1913, and died of pneumonia in prison on November 25, 1913.^{[A]}

The Carroll County prosecutor placed liens on all property owned by Floyd Allen and Sidna Allen for the heirs of the victims. After three wrongful death lawsuits by the victims' estates and survivors, that property was confiscated and sold at auction, forcing Sidna Allen's wife and two small daughters to live in rented quarters and work at menial jobs until Sidna's eventual pardon. Floyd Allen's son, Victor, bought his father's house so his mother would not have to move. In 1921, however, Victor moved his family to Tabernacle Township, New Jersey.

Jack Allen lost his job as constable as a result of the Hillsville shooting, and soon his life. On March 17, 1916, he stopped for the night in a roadhouse near Mt. Airy, North Carolina where he encountered Will McGraw, a moonshine hauler. A dispute arose between McGraw and Jack Allen about the Hillsville tragedy; during the confrontation McGraw drew a gun and shot Allen twice, killing him on the spot. Jack Allen was buried near his home in Carroll County, in the presence of a thousand mourners.

- A Some sources claim that Burden Marion was found beaten to death in his cell.

== List of the dead and wounded ==
Killed:

- Thornton Lemmon Massie, judge
- Lewis Franklin Webb, Carroll County sheriff
- William McDonald Foster, Commonwealth's Attorney
- J. H. Blankenship, juror
- Augustus Cezar Fowler, juror (died of wounds)
- Betty Ayres, witness

Wounded:

- Floyd Allen, defendant
- Sidna Allen, defendant
- Dexter Goad, Clerk of Court
- Christopher Columbus Cain, juror
- Faddis, Juror
- Andrew T. Howlett, spectator
- Elihue Clark Gillespie, Deputy
- Bruce Marshall, spectator
- Stuart Worrell, spectator

== See also ==
- Capital punishment in Virginia
- List of people executed in Virginia (pre-1972)
