= Devil's Den Nature Preserve =

Private nature preserve in Virginia

- IUCN category III (natural monument or feature)
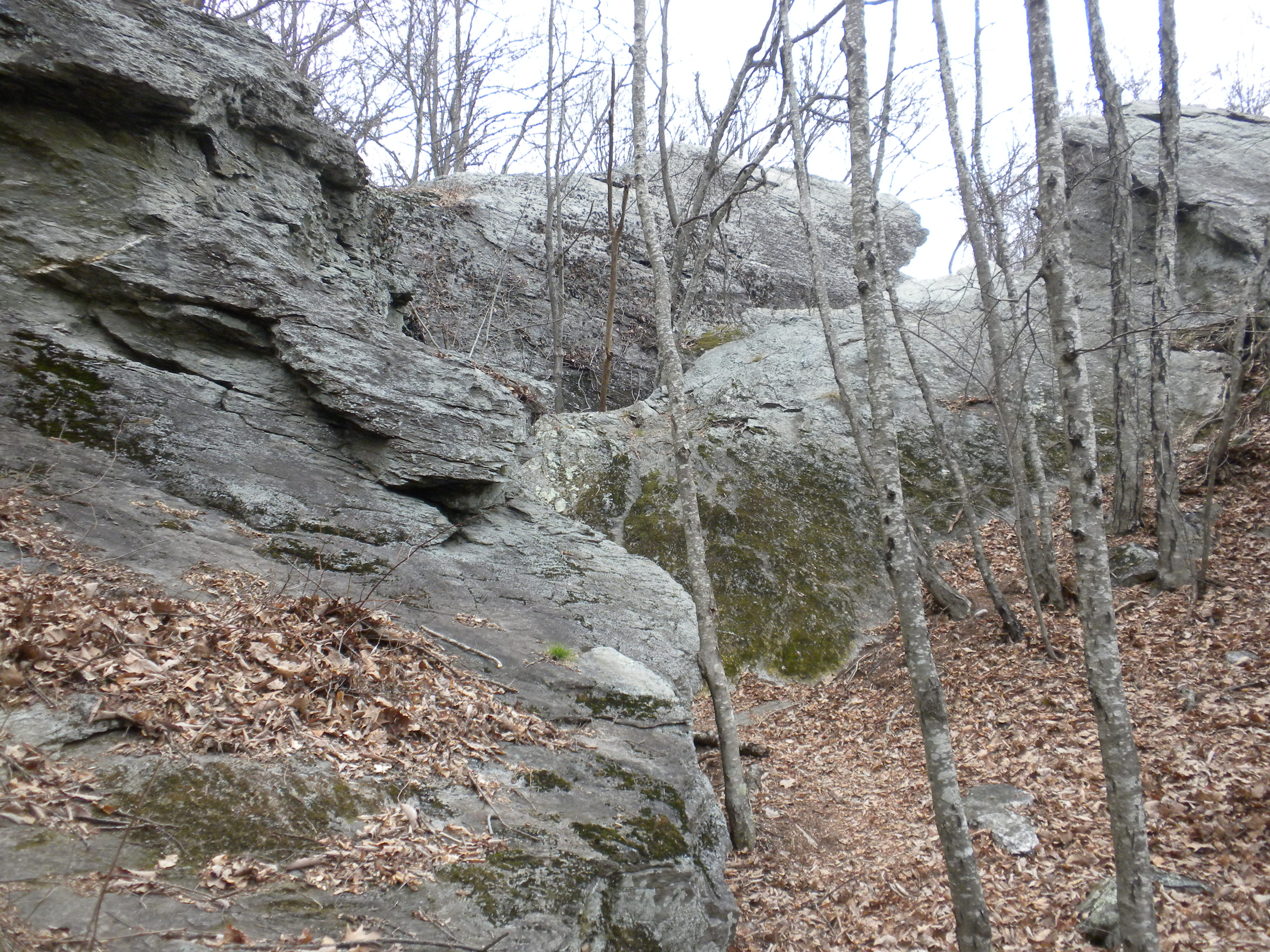
- Rock formations

- Location within Virginia
- Location: Carroll County, Virginia, United States
- Nearest town: Fancy Gap, Virginia
- Coordinates: 36.644585°N 80.703240°W
- Area: 280 acres (110 ha)
- Elevation: 2906

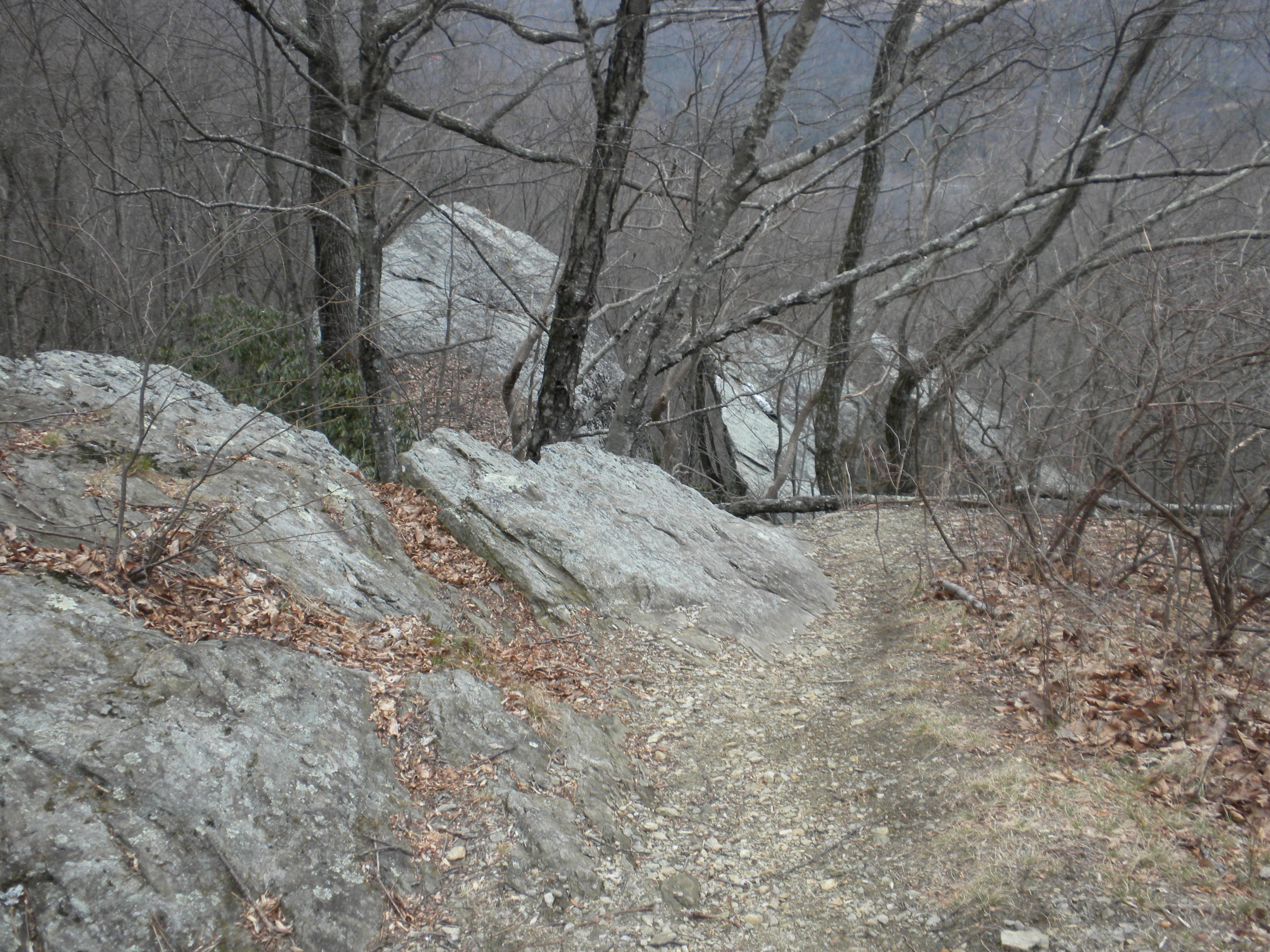
Top of rock formations

Devil's Den Nature Preserve is a 241-acre (113 ha) privately owned nature preserve in Carroll County, Virginia.

The preserve contains rugged rock formations on a ridge side, featuring a cave or rock shelter known as Devil's Den. The property was once the Robert S. Harris farm. .
