= George Lafayette Carter =

Appalachian developer and entrepreneur

George Lafayette Carter (1857–1936) was an American entrepreneur known as "the empire builder of southwest Virginia." He played a central role, with northern financing, in the development of the railroad infrastructure needed to extract and capitalize on natural resources, most principally coal, from the southern Appalachian region during the late 19th and early 20th centuries which helped determine its current economic situation.

== Biography ==
George Lafayette Carter was born to Walter Crockett Carter and Lucy Ann Jennings Carter on January 10, 1857, in Hillsville, Virginia. He was the first of nine children on the family farm. As a child, he read many great works including The Bible and Benjamin Franklin's autobiography.

Carter worked at the Hillsville General Store before pursuing a career of selling iron ore properties with the Wythe Lead and Zinc Company in Austinville, Virginia. He then found work with the Dora Furnace Company in Pulaski, Virginia, buying small mines throughout the area to provide coke for the furnaces. Carter would found the Tom's Creek Coal and Coke Company and in 1898, combine his operations to form the Carter Coal and Iron Company before forming the Virginia Iron, Coal, and Coke Company headquartered in Bristol, Virginia, in 1899.

With the help of New York City financiers, he would also form the Clinchfield Coal Company, which owned 300,000 acres of land throughout southwest Virginia. Carter's most reputable creations would be that of the Carolina, Clinchfield, and Ohio Railway and the development of the town of Kingsport, Tennessee. The creation of the railroad would further develop and open up the southern Appalachian region.

Carter would spend the years of 1907 and 1920 living in Johnson City, Tennessee, where he helped in the creation of a state teacher's college in 1911, known today as East Tennessee State University. Despite Carter's fame, he kept himself out of the headlines by owning the Bristol Herald, known today as the Bristol Herald-Courier.

Carter would also plan and create the coal towns of Coalwood, West Virginia, and Caretta, West Virginia where early workers were paid in scrip instead of money. Coalwood would later become famous as the boyhood home of the Rocket Boys and Homer Hickam. Other operations would include the Carter Coal and Dock Company which operated in New York, Boston, Providence, and Bridgeport. Carter maintained offices throughout the eastern part of the country, and died in Washington, D.C., in 1936. He is buried in Hillsville, Virginia.

In 2007, the George L. Carter Railroad Museum opened on the East Tennessee State University campus. The museum closed when the building it was housed in was demolished. It was replaced with the Johnson City Railroad Experience in 2024.
