= Fancy Gap, Virginia =

- CDP
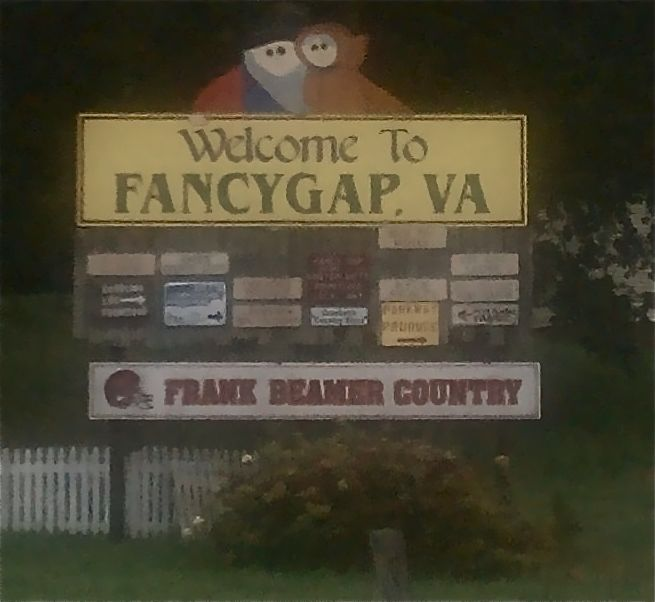
- Fancy Gap welcome sign

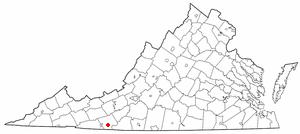
- Location of Fancy Gap, Virginia
- Coordinates: 36°40′12″N 80°42′3″W
- Country: United States
- State: Virginia
- County: Carroll

Area
  - Total: 4.1 sq mi (10.5 km^{2})
  - Land: 4.1 sq mi (10.5 km^{2})
  - Water: 0 sq mi (0.0 km^{2})
- Elevation: 2,894 ft (882 m)

Population (2010)
  - Total: 238
  - Density: 58.7/sq mi (22.7/km^{2})
- Time zone: UTC−5 (Eastern (EST))
  - Summer (DST): UTC−4 (EDT)
- ZIP Code: 24328
- Area code: 276
- FIPS code: 51-27296
- GNIS feature ID: 1495531

Fancy Gap is a census-designated place (CDP) in Carroll County, Virginia, United States. As of the 2020 census, Fancy Gap had a population of 214.

== Geography ==
Fancy Gap is located at 36°40′12″N 80°42′3″W (36.669884, −80.700892). According to the U.S. Census Bureau, the CDP has a total area of 4.1 square miles (10.5 km^{2}), all of it land.

== Demographics ==
Historical population
Census	Pop.	Note	%±
2000	260		—
2020	214		—
U.S. Decennial Census; 2000 2010 2020

Fancy Gap was first listed as a census designated place in the 2000 U.S. census.

At the 2000 census, there were 260 people, 110 households, and 81 families in the CDP. The population density was 64.2 people per square mile (24.8/km^{2}). There were 156 housing units at an average density of 38.5/sq mi (14.9/km^{2}). The racial makeup of the CDP was 99.23% White, 0.38% Native American, 0.38% from other races. Hispanic or Latino of any race were 0.38%.

Of the 110 households, 25.5% had children under the age of 18 living with them, 67.3% were married couples living together, 5.5% had a female householder with no husband present, and 25.5% were non-families. 23.6% of households were one person and 13.6% were one person aged 65 or older. The average household size was 2.36 and the average family size was 2.79.

The age distribution was 20.8% under the age of 18, 6.2% from 18 to 24, 25.8% from 25 to 44, 30.4% from 45 to 64, and 16.9% 65 or older. The median age was 42 years. For every 100 females, there were 89.8 males. For every 100 females age 18 and over, there were 85.6 males. The median household income was $22,250 and the median family income was $50,809. Males had a median income of $36,250 versus $32,500 for females. The per capita income for the CDP was $16,997. About 12.7% of families and 22.3% of the population were below the poverty line, including 30.4% of those under the age of eighteen and none of those sixty five or over.

== Notable person ==
- Frank Beamer (born 1946), former head football coach, Virginia Tech
