= Carroll County, Virginia =

County in Virginia, United States

- County
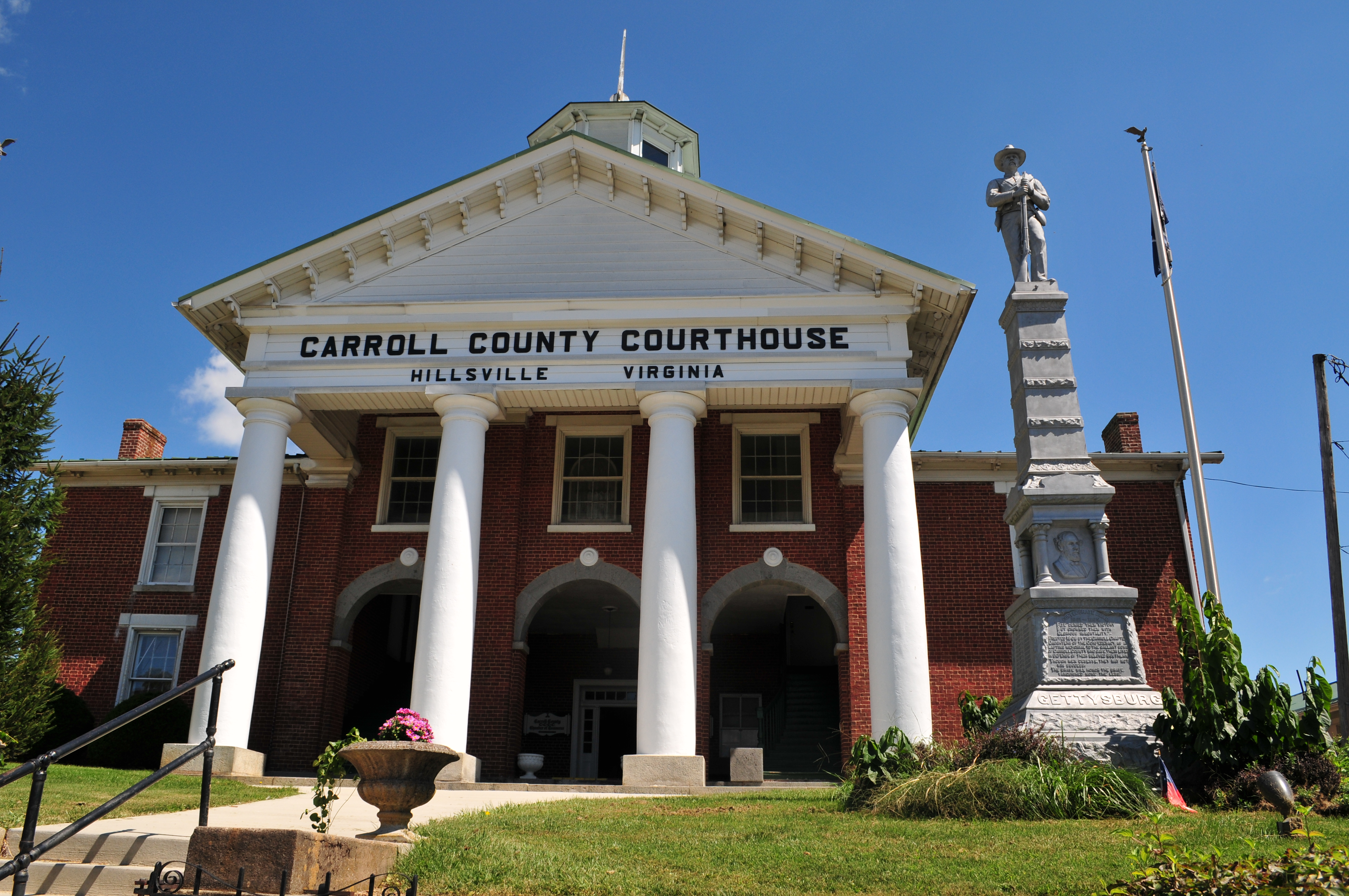
- Carroll County Courthouse and Confederate Monument

- Seal

- Location within the U.S. state of Virginia
- Coordinates: 36°44′N 80°44′W
- Country: United States
- State: Virginia
- Founded: 1842
- Named for: Charles Carroll
- Seat: Hillsville
- Largest town: Hillsville

Area
  - Total: 478 sq mi (1,240 km^{2})
  - Land: 475 sq mi (1,230 km^{2})
  - Water: 3 sq mi (7.8 km^{2}) 0.6%

Population (2020)
  - Total: 29,155
  - Estimate (2025): 29,299 ▲
  - Density: 61.4/sq mi (23.7/km^{2})
- Time zone: UTC−5 (Eastern)
  - Summer (DST): UTC−4 (EDT)
- Congressional district: 9th
- Website: carrollcountyva.gov

Carroll County is a United States county located in the southwestern part of the Commonwealth of Virginia. Roughly one fifth of the county lies in the Virginia Piedmont region, while the rest is part of the Appalachian Mountains. The county seat and only town is Hillsville.

The county was established in 1842 from part of Grayson County, and was officially named in honor of Charles Carroll, a signer of the Declaration of Independence. The borders of Carroll County were later expanded by including land from Patrick County.

The total size of the county is 478 square miles (1,240 km^{2}), and, as of the 2020 census, the population was 29,155.

== History ==
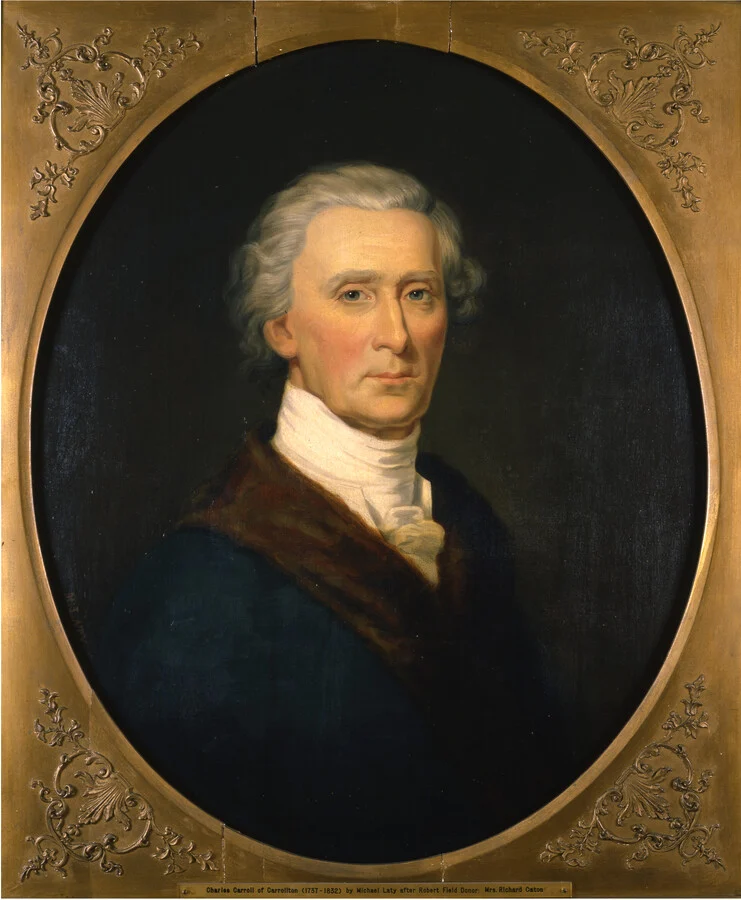
Charles Carroll of Carrollton, for whom the county was named

The first European settlers arrived in the region in the mid 18th century. These were primarily Scotch-Irish pioneers, who were used to high mountain altitudes. However, early settlement was slow, mostly due to the poor agricultural soil of the area. As a result, lead mining was one of the first economic activities in the region.

As the area's population density increased, Carroll County was created in 1842 from part of Grayson County. The new county was officially named for Charles Carroll, a signer of the Declaration of Independence, from Maryland. However, other accounts assert that John Carroll, a Virginia state legislator, had named the county in his own honor, but was blocked by a political rival who had it officially named for Charles Carroll instead.

Parts of Patrick County were added later to increase the size of Carroll County. The first piece was taken in 1845, and another part, which would later become the Fancy Gap District, was added in 1854.

== Geography ==
It is the only county in Virginia with Piedmont topography of roughly one fifth in the southeast part of the county and mountain topography of roughly four fifths elsewhere of the county. The Blue Ridge escarpment usually defines the county lines in both North Carolina and Virginia. The CDP community of Cana is in the Virginia Piedmont while the rest of the county is in the Appalachian Mountains.

According to the U.S. Census Bureau, the county has a total area of 478 square miles (1,240 km^{2}), of which 475 square miles (1,230 km^{2}) is land and 3 square miles (7.8 km^{2}) (0.6%) is water.

=== Adjacent counties / Independent city ===
- Galax - west
- Grayson County - west
- Wythe County - northwest
- Pulaski County - north
- Floyd County - northeast
- Patrick County - southeast
- Surry County, North Carolina - south

=== Protected areas ===
==== National ====
- Blue Ridge Parkway (part)
- Jefferson National Forest (part)
- Mount Rogers National Recreation Area (part)

==== Other ====
- Devil's Den Nature Preserve

=== Major highways ===
- I-74 (future)
- I-77
- US 52
- US 58
- US 221
- SR 94
- SR 100
- SR 148
- Blue Ridge Parkway

== Demographics ==
Historical population
Census	Pop.	Note	%±
1850	5,909		—
1860	8,012		35.6%
1870	9,147		14.2%
1880	13,323		45.7%
1890	15,497		16.3%
1900	19,303		24.6%
1910	21,116		9.4%
1920	21,283		0.8%
1930	22,141		4.0%
1940	25,904		17.0%
1950	26,695		3.1%
1960	23,178		−13.2%
1970	23,092		−0.4%
1980	27,270		18.1%
1990	26,594		−2.5%
2000	29,245		10.0%
2010	30,042		2.7%
2020	29,155		−3.0%
2025 (est.)	29,299	▲	0.5%
U.S. Decennial Census; 1790-1960 1900-1990; 1990-2000 2010 2020

=== Racial and ethnic composition ===
Carroll County, Virginia – Racial and ethnic composition Note: the US Census treats Hispanic/Latino as an ethnic category. This table excludes Latinos from the racial categories and assigns them to a separate category. Hispanics/Latinos may be of any race.
Race / Ethnicity (NH = Non-Hispanic)	Pop 1980	Pop 1990	Pop 2000	Pop 2010	Pop 2020	% 1980	% 1990	% 2000	% 2010	% 2020
White alone (NH)	26,986	26,286	28,436	28,820	27,040	98.96%	98.84%	97.23%	95.93%	92.75%
Black or African American alone (NH)	94	109	129	177	163	0.34%	0.41%	0.44%	0.59%	0.56%
Native American or Alaska Native alone (NH)	10	22	40	49	35	0.04%	0.08%	0.14%	0.16%	0.12%
Asian alone (NH)	12	26	28	51	80	0.04%	0.10%	0.10%	0.17%	0.27%
Native Hawaiian or Pacific Islander alone (NH)	x	x	0	5	3	x	x	0.00%	0.02%	0.01%
Other race alone (NH)	20	0	10	11	42	0.07%	0.00%	0.03%	0.04%	0.14%
Mixed race or Multiracial (NH)	x	x	123	153	750	x	x	0.42%	0.51%	2.57%
Hispanic or Latino (any race)	148	151	479	776	1,042	0.54%	0.57%	1.64%	2.58%	3.57%
Total	27,270	26,594	29,245	30,042	29,155	100.00%	100.00%	100.00%	100.00%	100.00%

=== 2020 census ===
As of the 2020 census, the county had a population of 29,155. The median age was 48.7 years. 18.7% of residents were under the age of 18 and 25.2% of residents were 65 years of age or older. For every 100 females there were 96.4 males, and for every 100 females age 18 and over there were 95.2 males age 18 and over.

The racial makeup of the county was 93.5% White, 0.6% Black or African American, 0.2% American Indian and Alaska Native, 0.3% Asian, 0.0% Native Hawaiian and Pacific Islander, 1.8% from some other race, and 3.6% from two or more races. Hispanic or Latino residents of any race comprised 3.6% of the population.

2.4% of residents lived in urban areas, while 97.6% lived in rural areas.

There were 12,744 households in the county, of which 23.1% had children under the age of 18 living with them and 25.1% had a female householder with no spouse or partner present. About 30.3% of all households were made up of individuals and 16.3% had someone living alone who was 65 years of age or older.

There were 16,579 housing units, of which 23.1% were vacant. Among occupied housing units, 77.1% were owner-occupied and 22.9% were renter-occupied. The homeowner vacancy rate was 1.9% and the rental vacancy rate was 8.0%.

=== 2000 Census ===
As of the census of 2000, there were 29,245 people, 12,186 households, and 8,786 families residing in the county. The population density was 61 people per square mile (24 people/km^{2}). There were 14,680 housing units at an average density of 31 units per square mile (12 units/km^{2}). The racial makeup of the county was 97.97% White, 0.44% Black or African American, 0.14% Native American, 0.10% Asian, 0.82% from other races, and 0.53% from two or more races. 1.64% of the population were Hispanic or Latino of any race.

There were 12,186 households, out of which 27.80% had children under the age of 18 living with them, 59.70% were married couples living together, 8.60% had a female householder with no husband present, and 27.90% were non-families. 25.40% of all households were made up of individuals, and 12.20% had someone living alone who was 65 years of age or older. The average household size was 2.36 and the average family size was 2.80.

In the county, the population was spread out, with 21.10% under the age of 18, 7.20% from 18 to 24, 28.00% from 25 to 44, 26.70% from 45 to 64, and 17.00% who were 65 years of age or older. The median age was 41 years. For every 100 females there were 97.20 males. For every 100 females aged 18 and over, there were 94.10 males. The median income for a household in the county was $30,597, and the median income for a family was $36,755. Males had a median income of $25,907 versus $19,697 for females. The per capita income for the county was $16,475. About 8.70% of families and 12.50% of the population were below the poverty line, including 15.70% of those under age 18 and 14.10% of those age 65 or over.

== Government and politics ==
After the Civil War Carroll County was, for the last 2 decades of the 19th century, part of the “Solid South” Virginia (Southern Democrats); but (beginning in 1896) became one of the first and few counties to reliably trend Republican during the time of entrenched southern Democratic domination. It was the only county in Virginia to vote for William Howard Taft during the 1912 election, and the only Democrat to carry the county in a presidential election since 1896 was Franklin D. Roosevelt in 1932. Since 1980 no Democrat has gained forty percent of the county's vote, and even with Virginian Tim Kaine on the ticket, Hillary Clinton gained less than twenty percent in the 2016 election. Democratic Senatorial candidate Mark Warner did however carry Carroll County in his landslide 2008 victory.

United States presidential election results for Carroll County, Virginia
Year	Republican		Democratic		Third party(ies)	
Year	No.	%	No.	%	No.	%
1880	338	20.00%	1,352	80.00%	0	0.00%
1884	998	44.71%	1,234	55.29%	0	0.00%
1888	1,147	46.14%	1,322	53.18%	17	0.68%
1892	1,008	40.19%	1,450	57.81%	50	1.99%
1896	1,673	52.17%	1,528	47.65%	6	0.19%
1900	1,759	54.92%	1,434	44.77%	10	0.31%
1904	1,265	59.03%	874	40.78%	4	0.19%
1908	1,521	63.91%	859	36.09%	0	0.00%
1912	874	43.96%	765	38.48%	349	17.56%
1916	1,424	62.40%	858	37.60%	0	0.00%
1920	2,520	66.47%	1,265	33.37%	6	0.16%
1924	1,743	57.79%	1,257	41.68%	16	0.53%
1928	2,459	68.76%	1,117	31.24%	0	0.00%
1932	1,461	48.28%	1,537	50.79%	28	0.93%
1936	3,245	60.45%	2,122	39.53%	1	0.02%
1940	1,835	54.19%	1,546	45.66%	5	0.15%
1944	2,352	63.07%	1,375	36.87%	2	0.05%
1948	2,456	65.72%	1,196	32.00%	85	2.27%
1952	3,774	68.68%	1,711	31.14%	10	0.18%
1956	4,060	69.66%	1,739	29.84%	29	0.50%
1960	3,705	66.29%	1,873	33.51%	11	0.20%
1964	3,617	58.85%	2,517	40.95%	12	0.20%
1968	4,909	64.16%	1,773	23.17%	969	12.67%
1972	5,247	75.08%	1,583	22.65%	159	2.28%
1976	4,820	53.75%	4,010	44.71%	138	1.54%
1980	5,905	61.29%	3,437	35.68%	292	3.03%
1984	7,056	70.26%	2,914	29.02%	72	0.72%
1988	6,377	66.17%	3,190	33.10%	70	0.73%
1992	5,664	51.89%	3,790	34.72%	1,461	13.39%
1996	5,088	51.04%	3,611	36.22%	1,270	12.74%
2000	7,142	64.92%	3,638	33.07%	221	2.01%
2004	8,173	67.39%	3,888	32.06%	67	0.55%
2008	8,187	65.08%	4,109	32.67%	283	2.25%
2012	8,736	67.63%	3,685	28.53%	497	3.85%
2016	10,663	78.01%	2,559	18.72%	446	3.26%
2020	12,659	80.88%	2,842	18.16%	150	0.96%
2024	13,152	81.19%	2,925	18.06%	123	0.76%

== Education ==
=== Public high schools ===
Carroll County High School, in Hillsville, serves the county. Home of the Cavaliers, CCHS is a 9-12 comprehensive high school. The school was created by the consolidation of Woodlawn High School (Woodlawn, Virginia) and Hillsville High School (Hillsville, Virginia).

- CCHS Official Site

== Communities ==
=== Town ===
- Hillsville

=== Census-designated places ===
- Cana
- Fancy Gap
- Hilltown (also in Grayson County)
- Woodlawn

=== Other unincorporated communities ===
- Austinville
- Dugspur
- Lambsburg
- Laurel Fork
- Sylvatus

== Notable people ==
- Floyd Allen (1856-1913) – former landowner and chief patriarch of the powerful Allen clan; convicted and executed for murder after sensational 1912 Hillsville courthouse shootout that killed five people including Circuit Judge Thornton Massie, Commonwealth's Attorney William Foster, and sheriff Lewis Webb.
- Doc Ayers – former Major League Baseball pitcher, Washington Senators, Detroit Tigers
- Kylene Barker – Miss America 1979
- Frank Beamer – former head football coach at Virginia Tech
- George Lafayette Carter – former land and railroad entrepreneur instrumental in the establishment of East Tennessee State University
- Charles B. Morris (1931-1996) – former U.S. Army, awarded the Medal of Honor, 1967
- Ernest Stoneman (1893–1968) – former country musician

== See also ==
- National Register of Historic Places listings in Carroll County, Virginia
