= Hillsville, Virginia =

Town in Virginia, United States

- Town
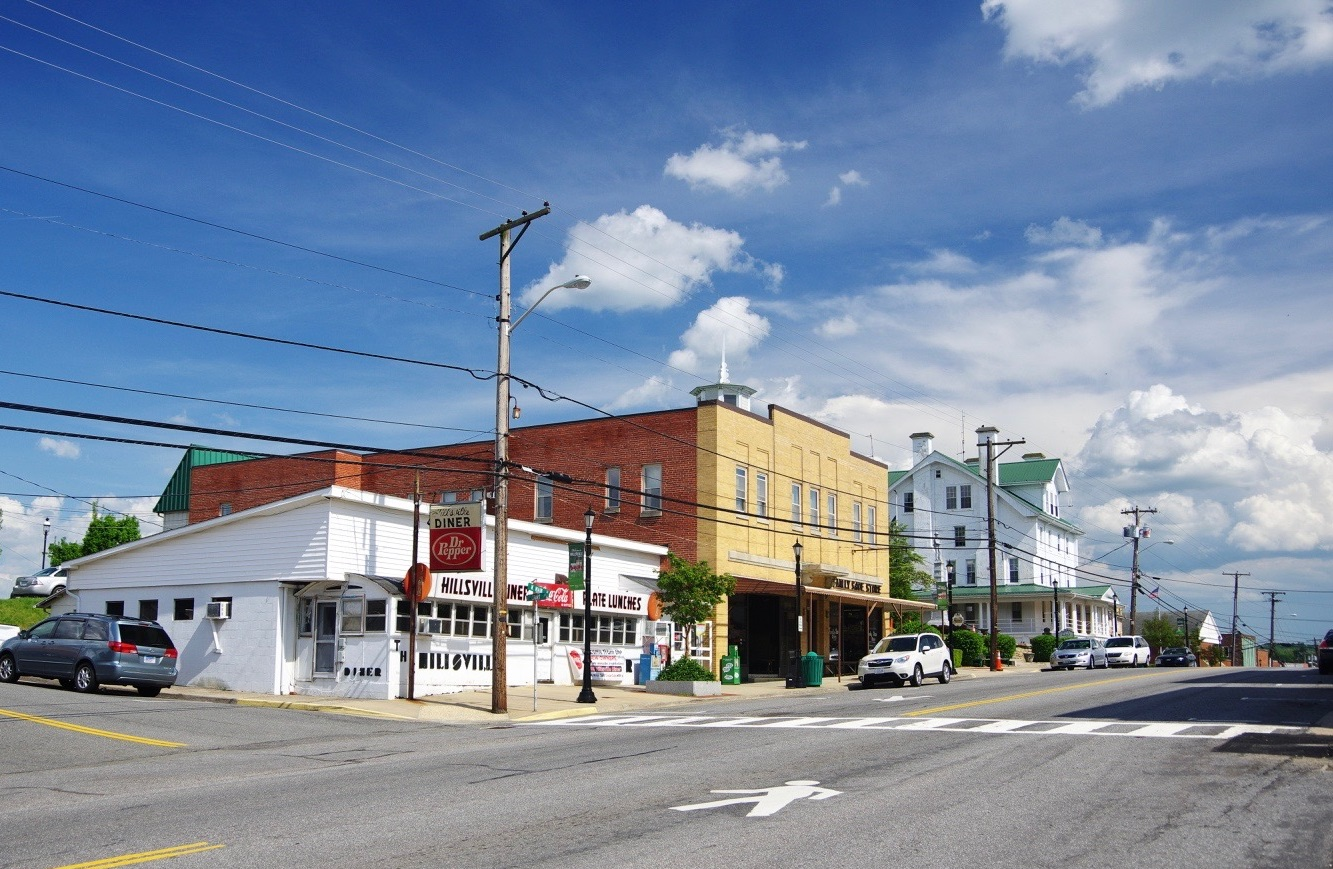
- Business along Main Street (US 52)

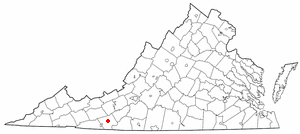
- Location in Virginia
- Coordinates: 36°45′32″N 80°44′4″W
- Country: United States
- State: Virginia
- County: Carroll
- Founded: 1842

Government
  - Mayor: Gregory N. Crowder

Area
  - Total: 9.75 sq mi (25.25 km^{2})
  - Land: 9.74 sq mi (25.22 km^{2})
  - Water: 0.012 sq mi (0.03 km^{2})
- Elevation: 2,516 ft (767 m)

Population (2020)
  - Total: 2,884 ▲
  - Estimate (2021): 2,876
  - Density: 273.3/sq mi (105.51/km^{2})
- Time zone: UTC−5 (Eastern (EST))
  - Summer (DST): UTC−4 (EDT)
- ZIP code: 24343
- Area code: 276
- FIPS code: 51-37336
- GNIS feature ID: 1498493
- Website: www.townofhillsville.com

Hillsville is a town in Carroll County, Virginia, United States. The population was 2,897 at the 2020 census. It is the county seat of Carroll County.

== Geography ==
Hillsville is located in central Carroll County at 36°45′32″N 80°44′04″W (36.758814, −80.734510). U.S. Routes 52, 221 and 58 intersect in the center of town. US 52 leads northwest 28 miles (45 km) to Wytheville and south 22 miles (35 km) to Mount Airy, North Carolina, while US 221 leads northeast 70 miles (110 km) to Roanoke and southwest 13 miles (21 km) to Galax. US 58 leads east 63 miles (101 km) to Martinsville and west to Galax with US 221. The Hillsville town limits extend west along US 221 and 58 2.5 miles (4.0 km) to Interstate 77, which leads north 17 miles (27 km) to Interstate 81 east of Wytheville and south 20 miles (32 km) to Interstate 74 in North Carolina.

According to the United States Census Bureau, Hillsville has a total area of 8.9 square miles (23.0 km^{2}), of which 0.01 square miles (0.03 km^{2}), or 0.11%, is water.

Carroll County is located within the Blue Ridge Mountain range of the Appalachian Mountains. The Blue Ridge Parkway runs through Carroll County 9 miles (14 km) south of Hillsville.

=== Climate ===
The climate in this area features moderate differences between highs and lows, and there is adequate rainfall year-round. According to the Köppen Climate Classification system, Hillsville has a marine west coast climate, abbreviated "Cfb" on climate maps.

== Demographics ==
Historical population
Census	Pop.	Note	%±
1850	181		—
1870	268		—
1930	485		—
1940	656		35.3%
1950	764		16.5%
1960	905		18.5%
1970	1,149		27.0%
1980	2,123		84.8%
1990	2,008		−5.4%
2000	2,607		29.8%
2010	2,681		2.8%
2020	2,884		7.6%
2021 (est.)	2,876	▼	−0.3%
U.S. Decennial Census

As of the census of 2000, there were 2,607 people, 1,207 households, and 731 families residing in the town. The population density was 457.6 people per square mile (176.6/km^{2}). There were 1,352 housing units at an average density of 237.3 per square mile (91.6/km^{2}). The racial makeup of the town was 96.39% White, 0.19% African American, 0.15% Native American, 0.42% Asian, 1.76% from other races, and 1.07% from two or more races. Hispanic or Latino of any race were 3.34% of the population.

There were 1,207 households, out of which 23.1% had children under the age of 18 living with them, 44.3% were married couples living together, 13.5% had a female householder with no husband present, and 39.4% were non-families. 35.5% of all households were made up of individuals, and 18.2% had someone living alone who was 65 years of age or older. The average household size was 2.11 and the average family size was 2.71.

In the town, the population was spread out, with 18.8% under the age of 18, 9.7% from 18 to 24, 23.8% from 25 to 44, 24.4% from 45 to 64, and 23.3% who were 65 years of age or older. The median age was 43 years. For every 100 females, there were 84.1 males. For every 100 females age 18 and over, there were 78.6 males.

The median income for a household in the town was $27,148, and the median income for a family was $36,117. Males had a median income of $26,625 versus $18,194 for females. The per capita income for the town was $16,633. About 12.9% of families and 16.4% of the population were below the poverty line, including 26.3% of those under age 18 and 11.4% of those age 65 or over.

According to the Modern Language Association, there are (in descending order) 2,372 English speakers, 55 Spanish speakers, 18 Vietnamese speakers, 5 German speakers, 4 Italian speakers, 3 Portuguese speakers, and 3 Russian speakers. Thus, less than 4% of the town of Hillsville speaks a non-English language at home.

== Hillsville Flea Markets ==
Known for its events, the Hillsville Flea Markets are two of the largest. Held annually on Memorial Day weekend and Labor Day weekend, the latter has been called the largest American flea market to the east of the Mississippi River. In 2004, the Labor Day show attracted 650,000+ visitors, and the Memorial Day show attracted 250,000+ visitors. Vendors and customers have arrived from as far away as Germany, Africa, and South Korea.

== Carroll County Courthouse shooting ==
On March 12, 1912, a gunfight broke out in the Carroll County Courthouse after the conviction of Floyd Allen, wealthy landowner and patriarch of the then-powerful Allen clan. The story made national headlines until it was eclipsed by the sinking of the Titanic on April 12, 1912. Floyd Allen was on trial for illegal rescue of prisoners, assault and battery, and interfering with deputies. The charges stemmed from an altercation during which he freed his nephews—who had been arrested for brawling and disrupting a religious service, fled to North Carolina, but were recaptured and being taken to the Carroll county jail—and pistol-whipped a deputy sheriff with his own malfunctioning gun, leaving the officer unconscious.

Arrogant and short-tempered, Floyd had vowed he would never spend a day in jail. He had previously avoided jail time for other crimes, including killing a black man who was supposedly hunting on his property in North Carolina, nearly killing the successful purchaser of a farm he wanted, and even attempting to kill his own brother. Prosecutor William Foster (who had won his elective office by defeating another Allen clan member) received death threats but proceeded to trial beginning on March 12. However, the jury was deadlocked and therefore kept overnight in a local hotel. The next morning, after Floyd was convicted, Judge Thornton Massie refused to set aside the verdict (as had happened in an earlier case), and sentenced Floyd Allen to a year in jail and a $1000 fine, at which point Allen stood up and openly refused to go.

Gunfire erupted between lawmen and Floyd and several Allen family members present at the trial who came to his "aid". Researchers continue to disagree as to who fired the first shot. An estimated fifty shots were exchanged before more than 100 witnesses; Judge Massie, prosecutor Foster, Sheriff Lewis Webb, and the jury foreman were shot dead, and a witness died of her wounds the following day. Floyd, his brother Sidna, the court clerk, a deputy, another juror and two spectators were wounded.

Floyd and his family initially escaped. Because Virginia law at the time said deputies' law enforcement powers depended on their sheriff being alive, the assistant court clerk S. Floyd Landreth telegraphed Governor William Hodges Mann, who sent deputies employed by the Baldwin–Felts Detective Agency by train from Roanoke.

The wounded Floyd Allen and his son Victor had stayed in a Hillsville hotel overnight and were arrested the next morning. Other members of the Allen clan were soon captured. However, Sidna Allen and his cousin Wesley Edwards escaped, and were captured months later in Des Moines, Iowa.

For their parts in the fatal melee, Floyd and Claude Allen eventually received the death penalty, and were electrocuted in late March 1913. Victor Allen was later acquitted: Governor Elbert Lee Trinkle pardoned two Allen cousins in 1922, and Governor Harry F. Byrd pardoned Sidna Allen and Wesley Edwards in 1926.

== Points of interest ==
- Hale-Wilkinson-Carter Home. Known as the "Carter Home" by locals, this 5-story, 34-room house was home to George Lafayette Carter, the empire builder of Southwest Virginia. The grand structure is open for tours, can be rented for events, and houses the Carrol County Creative Arts Center.
- Historic Carroll County Courthouse & Museum. Built in 1873, the historic courthouse is the site of the tragic courtroom shooting of 1912 and is the current site of the museum. The museum has extensive archive and reference materials in its resource section, as well as exhibits and artifacts that reflect the heritage of Carroll County.
- Hillsville Diner. The oldest, continuously operating streetcar diner in Virginia.
- Town of Hillsville Farmers Market (TOHFM). Seasonal market in the heart of the historic district, located behind the Hale-Wilkinson-Carter Home. Open June–October, the market is a draw for locals and tourists alike, boasting produce, meats, crafts, honey, baked goods, and plants all locally sourced.
- Sidna Allen House

== Events ==
- Second Saturday Concerts and Classic Car Cruise-In. Free concert at Courthouse Square, second Saturday of the month, May–September.
- Independence Day Parade & Celebration. One of the largest fireworks shows in southwest Virginia. Located at Grover King VFW, 701 W. Stuart Drive.
- Historic Hillsville Chili Shootout. Held in the fall annually.
- Safe Halloween. October 31, N. Main Street. Trick-or-treating, costume contest (all ages), and games.
- Christmas Celebration & Parade. First Saturday of December. Stocking giveaways, bonfires, caroling, Santa on the Hale-Wilkinson-Carter Home porch, tree lighting, and parade.

== Notable people ==
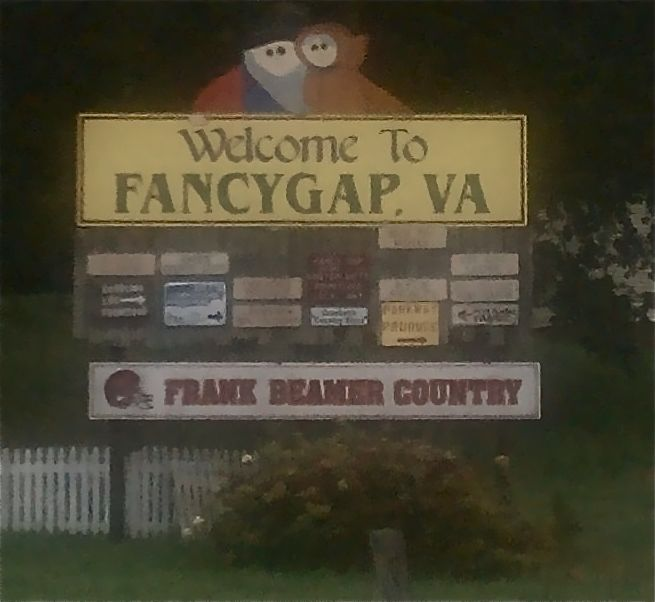
Nearby Fancy Gap, Virginia shows its pride for Frank Beamer.

- Kylene Barker, Miss America 1979, graduated from Hillsville's Carroll County High School.
- Frank Beamer, former Virginia Tech head football coach, is an alumnus of Hillsville High.
- George Lafayette Carter, land, railroad entrepreneur, instrumental in the establishment of East Tennessee State University.
- Elizabeth Fry Page (1865–1943), author, editor
