= Snake (disambiguation) =

A snake is an elongated, legless, predatory reptile.

Snake or Snakes may also refer to:

== Devices ==
- Bore snake, a tool to clean guns
- Plumber's snake
- Snake cable

== Games and toys ==
- Snake (video game genre)
  - Snake (1998 video game), a game included on Nokia cellphones
  - Snakes (N-Gage game)
- S.N.A.K.E., a G.I. Joe accessory
- Mehen (game), an ancient Egyptian board game depicting a snake

== Music ==
=== Performers ===
- The Snakes, a British-Norwegian hard rock band
- "Snake", Denis Bélanger (born 1960), Canadian vocalist of the heavy metal band Voivod
- "Snake", Axana Ceulemans, member of the 1990s Belgian girl group Def Dames Dope
- Mark "Snake" Luckhurst (born 1961), British bass guitarist and a founding member of the hard rock band Thunder
- Dave "The Snake" Sabo (born 1964), American guitarist in the heavy metal band Skid Row
- DJ Snake, French record producer and DJ

=== Albums ===
- Snake (album), by Exuma, 1972
- The Snake (Shane MacGowan album), 1994
- The Snake (Wildbirds & Peacedrums album), 2008
- The Snake, a Harvey Mandel album

=== Songs ===
- "Snake" (R. Kelly song), 2003
- Snake (Yorushika song), 2025
- "Snake", by Muddy Waters
- "Snake", by PJ Harvey from Rid of Me, 1993
- "Snake", by G-Unit
- "Snake", by Ronnie Lane
- "Snake", by King Curtis, 2000
- The Snake (song), 1960s song recorded by Oscar Brown and by Al Wilson
- "The Snake", by Joe Satriani on the album Not of This Earth
- "The Snake", by Johnny Rivers on the album ...And I Know You Wanna Dance
- "Snakes", by No Doubt on the album The Beacon Street Collection
- "Snakes", by Voltaire on the album The Devil's Bris
- "Snakes", by Papa Roach on the album Infest
- "Snakes", by Pvris on the album Arcane League of Legends
- "Snakes", by Six Feet Under on the album True Carnage
- "Snakes", by Bastille on the album Wild World
- "Snakes", by Prodigy on the album Hegelian Dialectic
- "Snakes", by Joey Badass on the album 1999

== Places ==
- Snake Creek (disambiguation)
- Snake Hill, in the U.S. state of New Jersey
- Snake Island (disambiguation)
- Snake River (disambiguation)

== People ==
- Snake Indians, Native Americans
- Reuben Snake (1937–1993), Native American activist, educator, spiritual leader, and tribal leader
- Snake Shyam (born 1967), Indian wildlife conservationist
- The Snake (nickname), various people nicknamed either The Snake or Snake
- "The Snake", ring name of Jake Roberts (born 1955), American professional wrestler
- Snake Williams, a professional wrestler from All-Star Wrestling

== Fictional characters ==
- Snake Plissken, protagonist of the films Escape from New York and Escape from L.A.
- a nickname of John Clark, in Tom Clancy novels and film adaptations
- Snake Jailbird, a Simpsons character
- Archie "Snake" Simpson, a Degrassi character
- Snakes, one of two time traveling warring factions in The Big Time, a science fiction novel by Fritz Leiber
- Snake, a character from the Zero Escape series of visual novels
- Snake, a Black Butler character
- Snake, a The Karate Kid Part III character
- Snake, a The Powerpuff Girls character
- Snake, a Snake Tales character
- Snakes, a member of the Union in Marvel Comics
- Snake, a Vinland Saga character
- Snake, any of several characters in the Metal Gear video game series
  - Solid Snake
  - Liquid Snake
  - Solidus Snake, A.K.A. George Sears
  - Naked Snake, A.K.A. Big Boss
  - Punished "Venom" Snake

== Sports teams ==
- Aberdare RFC, a rugby union club based in Aberdare, Wales, United Kingdom
- Arizona Diamondbacks, a Major League Baseball team based in Phoenix, Arizona, United States
- Columbus Cottonmouths, an ice hockey team based in Columbus, Georgia, United States
- Lugano Snakes, former name of the Lugano Tigers, a Swiss basketball club

== In the military ==
- HMS Snake, several Royal Navy ships
- a nickname of the Bell AH-1 Cobra attack helicopter
- nickname of a variant of the Mark 81 bomb

== Literature ==
- "Snake", a 1921 poem by D. H. Lawrence
- The Snake (Dagerman novel) (Swedish: Ormen), a 1945 novel by Stig Dagerman
- The Snake (Spillane novel), a 1964 novel by Mickey Spillane
- Snake, a 1975 novel by James H. McClure
- Snake!, a 1976 novel by Naomi Mitchison
- The Snake, a 1978 novel by Morton Freedgood
- Snakes, a 1986 novel by Guy N. Smith
- Snake, a 1991 novel in the Degrassi Classic series of novels by Catherine Dunphy
- Snake, a 1996 novel by Kate Jennings
- The Snake, a 1997 novel by Suhayl Saadi, writing as Melanie Desmoulins
- Snake, a 2005 novel by Jeff Stone, the third volume in The Five Ancestors series
- Snakes, a book by Indian science writer Sukanya Datta

== Other uses ==
- Snake (computer vision)
- Snake (zodiac)
- The Snake (TV series), a 2025 reality competition series
- "Snakes" (CSI), an episode of Season 5 of the television series CSI
- Snake, a large sculpture created by Richard Serra
- Snake Kung Fu
- Snake, nickname of the first of two NZR B class (1874) steam locomotives
- Snake Projection, a map projection for linear projects
- The Snake (film), a 2026 Canadian comedy film

== See also ==
- Rubik's Snake, a puzzle toy
