= Snake Creek =

Snake Creek may refer to:

- Snake Creek, Oklahoma, a census-designated place in Mayes County
- Snake Creek (Cadosia Creek tributary), a river in New York
- Snake Creek (Susquehanna River), a tributary of the Susquehanna River in Pennsylvania and New York
- Snake Creek (Grand River), a stream in South Dakota
- Snake Creek (James River), a stream in South Dakota
- Snake Creek (Missouri River), a stream in South Dakota
- Snake Creek (South Fork Grand River), a stream in South Dakota
- Snake Creek (Tennessee River tributary), a stream in Tennessee
- Snake Creek, a stream in Utah

== See also ==
- Snake Creek Formation, a geologic formation in Nebraska
- Snake Creek Farm Historic District, near Hillsville, Virginia
- Snake River (disambiguation)
