= List of islands of Bulgaria =

This is a list of islands of Bulgaria.

== Islands in the Danube ==
- Aleko Island
- Batin Island
- Belene Island (also known as Persin Island)
- Bogdan Island
- Chayka Island
- Devnya Island
- Dobrina island
- Dovlek Island
- Golya Kutovo Island
- Golyam Bliznak Island
- Golyam Brashlen island
- Golyama Barzina Island
- Gradina Island
- The Haiduk island
- Island Bezimenen
- Island Florentin
- Kalimok Island
- Kicha Island
- Kozloduy Island
- Lakat Island
- Lyulyak Island
- Magaritsa Island
- Malak Bliznak Island
- Malak Brashlen island
- Malak Vardim Island
- Malka Barzina Island
- Milka Island
- Oreh island
- Palets Island
- Pozharevski ostrovi (Golyamо Pozharevo and Malко Pozharevo)
- Predel Island
- Radetski Island
- Skomen Island
- Timok Island
- Tsibar island
- Tsibritsa Island
- Tutrakan Island
- Vardim Island
- Vazhetoarya Island
- Vetren Island

== Islands in the Black Sea ==
- St. Anastasia Island (formerly Bolshevik Island)
- St. Cyricus Island
- St. Ivan Island
- St. Peter Island
- St. Thomas Island (also known as Snake Island, not to be confused with another Snake Island, also in the Black Sea)

== See also ==
- List of islands
- List of islands of Europe
