= St. Thomas Island (Bulgaria) =

Island in Bulgaria

Coordinates: 42°20′29″N 27°44′02″E

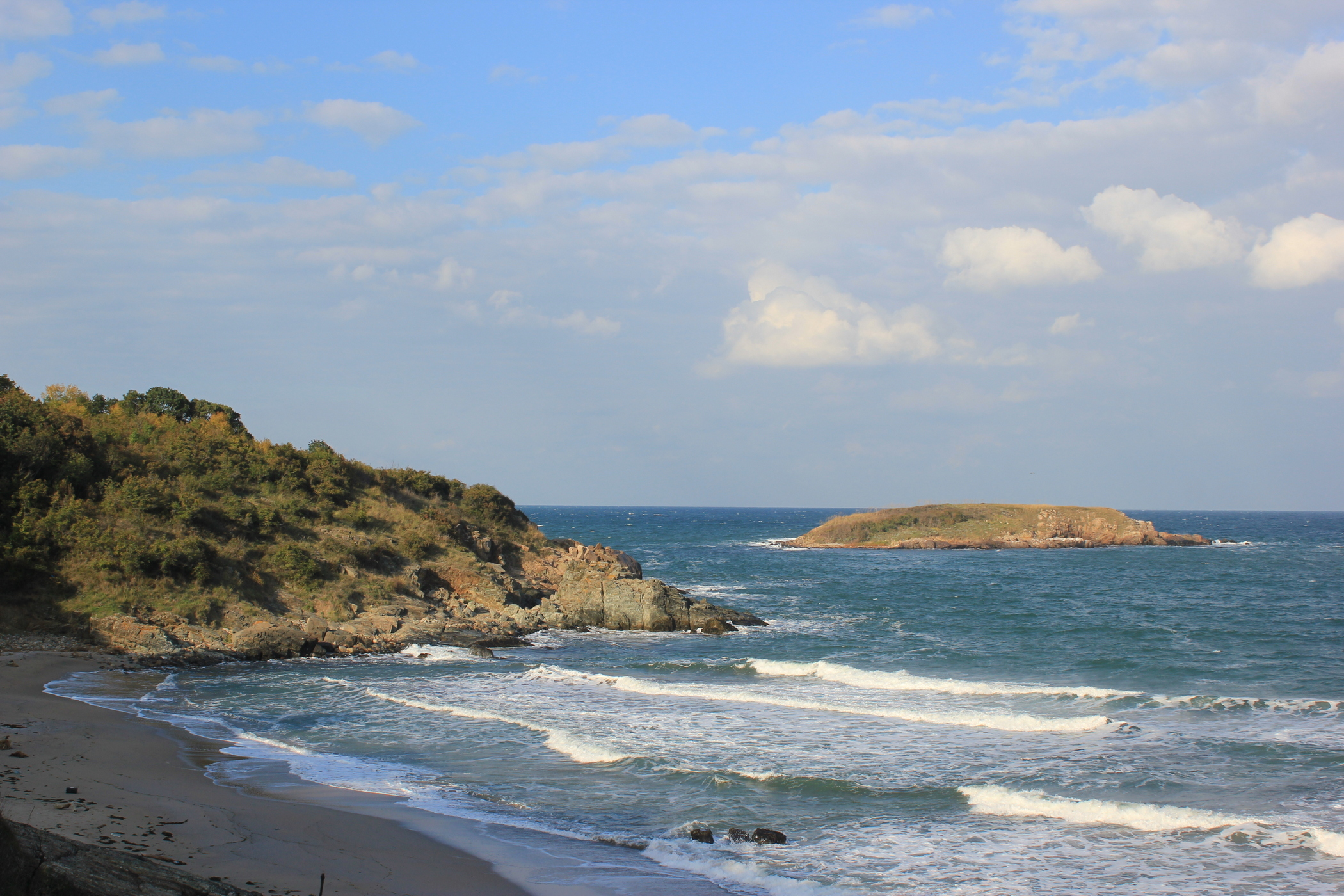
The island as seen from the coast

St. Thomas Island (Bulgarian: остров св. Тома, ostrov sv. Toma) or Zmiyski ostrov (Змийски остров, Snake island), is a Bulgarian island in the Black Sea.

It is situated in Burgas Province, Primorsko Municipality, 7 km (4 mi) north of Primorsko and 15 km (9 mi) km south of Sozopol.

== Island ==
It has an area of 0.012 km^{2} (0.0046 sq mi; 3.0 acres) and is one of a very few places in Bulgaria where wild cacti grow. The Opuntia cacti were brought from the Botanical Garden in Bratislava, Slovakia and planted by the royal botanist Ivan Buresh on the orders of Tsar Boris III in 1933. They have covered most of the island since then.

St. Thomas Island is named after a chapel dedicated to Saint Thomas that once existed on it. Snake Island, the alternate name, refers to the abundant grey water snakes that inhabit it, feeding on fish. The island is part of the Ropotamo nature reserve and lies 0.4 km (0.2 nmi) southeast of Humata Foreland in Arkutino Bay.

The first archaeological expedition on the island began in 1955 and exposed the ruins of a small church and some auxiliary buildings. In a new archaeological expedition in 2018, archaeologists discovered an ancient Thracian settlement from the early Iron Age, ancient Thracian ritual pits, a Byzantine settlement from the 5th – 6th century AD, a small monastery from the 12th-14th century and a sunken fortress from ancient Thrace in the waters between the island and the Bulgarian mainland. Bulgaria's National Museum of History said that "The exposed finds indicate that a large sea route shrine was located on the St. Thomas Island," and "The place was chosen for a reason since it was right off the ancient road from Sozopol (Apollonia Pontica) to Constantinople (at the time the ancient Greek colony of Byzantium)."

== Gallery ==
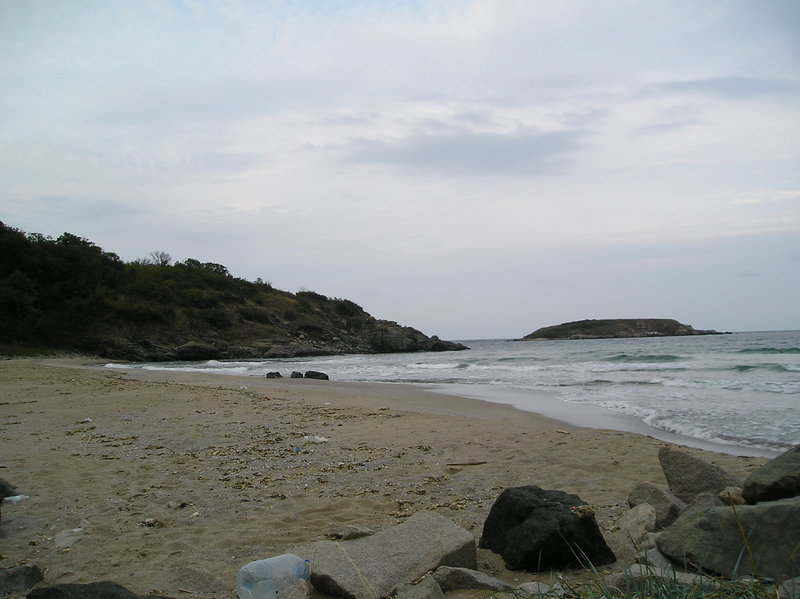
St. Thomas Island from Arkutino

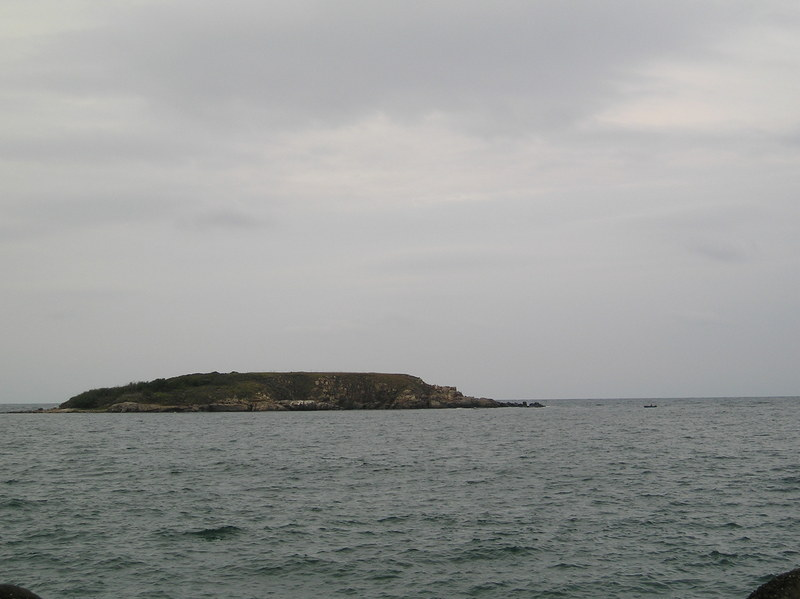
St. Thomas Island

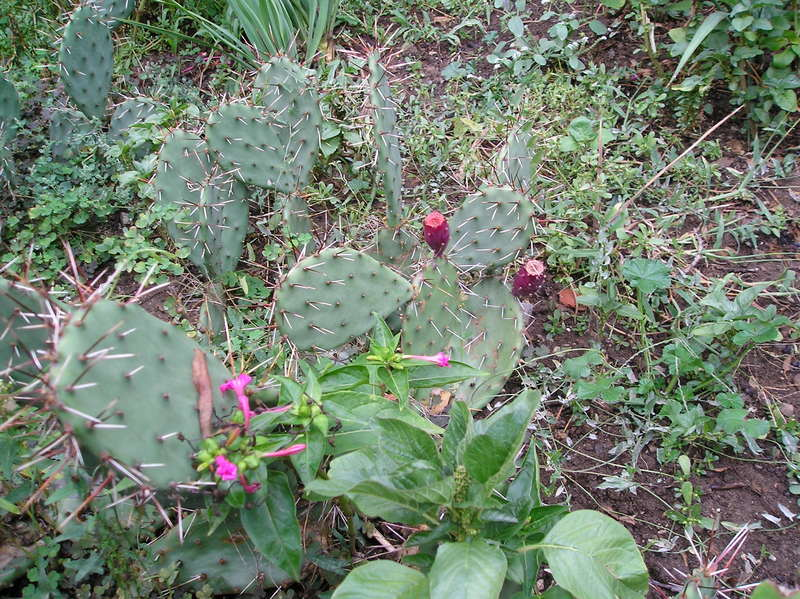
Wild cacti

== See also ==
- List of islands of Bulgaria
- St. Anastasia Island
- St. Cyricus Island
- St. Ivan Island
