= Legea =

Italian sportswear company

LEGEA S.p.A.
- Type: S.p.A.
- Industry: Textile, footwear
- Founded: 1993; 33 years ago
- Headquarters: Pompei, Italy
- Area served: Worldwide
- Key people: Giovanni Acanfora, Emilia Acanfora, Luigi Acanfora
- Products: Sportswear, football boots
- Website: legea.it

Legea (stylised as LEGEA) is an Italian sportswear company, founded in 1993 by brothers Giovanni, Emilia and Luigi Acanfora. It is one of the most popular brands among Italian amateur football teams, then expanding to professional clubs.

Legea is a technical sponsor of the Montenegro national team. It also sponsors teams such as Palermo, Cosenza calcio, Reggina calcio and Livorno calcio in Italy, Nac Breda and N.E.C. in the Netherlands, the New Saints FC and Carmarthen Town FC in Wales, CD Feirense in Portugal, Lommel United in Belgium, FC Chernomorets and Futbol'nyj Klub L'vivin in Ukraine, Spartak Subotica in Serbia, NK Celje in Slovenia, Levadiakos and Athlītikī Enōsī Larisas 1964 in Greece, Ermis Aradippou in Cyprus.

Legea was the only Italian brand to sponsor a national team in the 2010 FIFA World Cup, the national team of North Korea. Legea is headquartered in Pompei and has Legea Points (shops) throughout Italy. It also has distributors in Europe, Canada, the United States and Australia.

== History ==
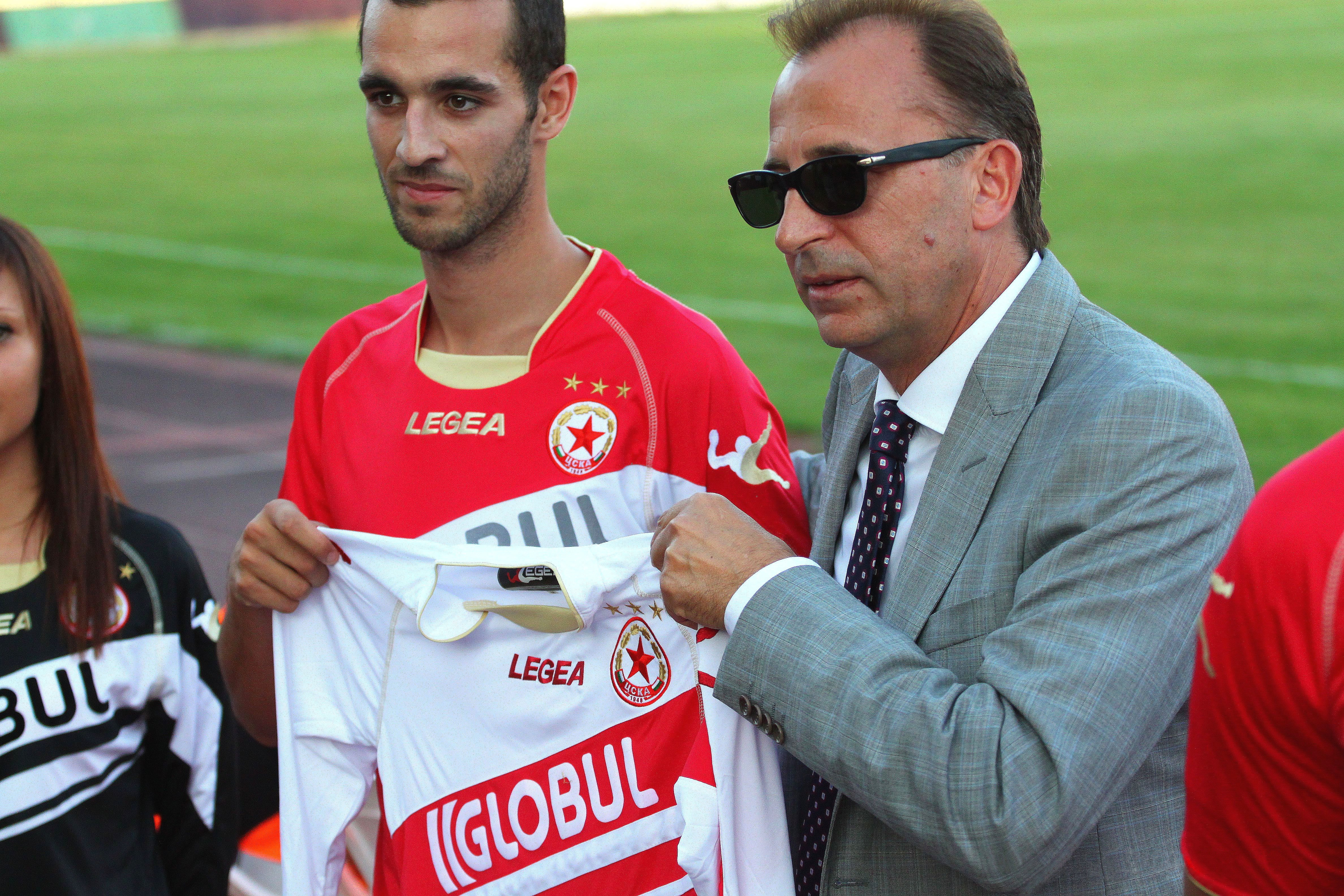
Legea concluded a contract in 2012 with 31-time Bulgarian A Professional Football Group champions CSKA Sofia

During the 2010 FIFA World Cup in South Africa, Legea sponsored the North Korean soccer team. According to the company, "Many ask us what interest we could have in sponsoring North Korea, and whether this could not amount to negative publicity, but we disagree... there is no negative publicity."

== See also ==
Excludes articles found in Category:Sporting goods manufacturers of Italy.

- Sergio Tacchini
