= Snake Island =

Snake Island may refer to:

== Places ==
=== Australia ===
- Snake Island (New South Wales), in the Hawkesbury River
- Snake Island (Tasmania)
- Snake Island (Victoria)

=== Brazil ===
- Ilha da Queimada Grande, nicknamed Snake Island, located off the southeastern corner of Brazil
- Ilha das Cobras, off the coast of Rio de Janeiro

=== Canada ===
- Snake Island (Nanaimo)
- Snake Island (Lake Simcoe)
- Snake Island, one of the Toronto Islands in Lake Ontario
- Snake Island Lake, a lake in Ontario

=== Nigeria ===
- Snake Island (Lagos)

=== Ukraine ===
- Snake Island (Ukraine), in the Black Sea

=== United States ===
- Snake Island (Massachusetts)
- Isla Culebra, Puerto Rico

=== Elsewhere ===
- St. Thomas Island (Bulgaria), also known as Snake Island, in the Black Sea, Bulgaria
- Kalampunian Damit Island, Malaysia
- Golem Grad, also known as Snake Island, North Macedonia
- Vigan Island, also known as Snake Island, Philippines

== Film and television ==
- Snake Island (film), a 2002 film
- Treasure Quest: Snake Island, an American reality television series

== See also ==
- Serpent Island (disambiguation)
