= Old Mill State Park =

- Old Mill State Park WPA/Rustic Style Historic Resources
- U.S. National Register of Historic Places
- U.S. Historic district
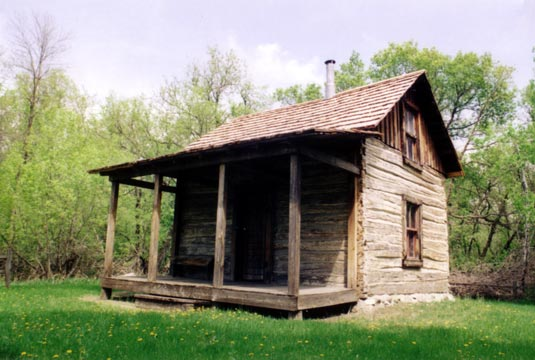

- Location within Minnesota Location within the United States
- Location: Marshall County, Minnesota, Off Co. Hwy. 39 E of Argyle
- Nearest city: Argyle, Minnesota
- Coordinates: 48.361364°N 96.570329°W
- Area: 25 acres (10 ha)
- Built: 1937
- Architect: Multiple
- Architectural style: NPS rustic architecture
- Visitation: 14,465 (2006)
- MPS: Minnesota State Park CCC/WPA/Rustic Style MPS
- NRHP reference No.: 89001667
- Added to NRHP: October 25, 1989

Old Mill State Park is a small Minnesota state park on the Middle River between Argyle and Newfolden on an ancient beach of glacial Lake Agassiz in Marshall County in the northwestern part of the state.

It is a 406-acre (164 ha) park.

== History ==
The park area was originally homesteaded by the Larson Family in 1882. A series of water- and wind-powered mills were soon built in the area. Eventually a steam-powered mill replaced the older technology. The state bought the area in 1937 and rebuilt the steam engine in 1958. Every year as part of the park's special events and interpretive programs, the old mill is run as it had been years ago.

== Wildlife ==
Many species are attracted to the river that runs through the park. Deer and moose are the largest animals that frequent the park. Beaver, raccoon, white-tailed jackrabbits and snowshoe hares are common. A bird migration route runs through the park adding more wildlife especially in the spring and fall. The ground-nesting marsh hawk is a common summer resident. Owls and the occasional eagle have been sighted in the park.

== National Register of Historic Places ==
A 25-acre (10 ha) historic district including eight contributing buildings and structures, built by the Works Progress Administration, is listed on the National Register of Historic Places. The Larson Mill is listed separately on the National Register of Historic Places.
