= Cadosia Creek =

Location
- Country: United States
- State: New York

Physical characteristics
- Source
  - location: Delaware County, New York
- Mouth: East Branch Delaware River
  - location: Cadosia, New York, Delaware County, New York, United States
  - coordinates: 41°57′47″N 75°15′47″W
- Basin size: 18 mi^{2} (47 km^{2})

Basin features
- Tributaries
  - left: Al Fisher Brook, Snake Creek
  - right: Coon Hill Brook

Cadosia Creek is a river in Delaware County, New York. It flows into the East Branch Delaware River east-northeast of Hancock.
