= Coon Hill Brook =

- Location of the mouth of Coon Hill Brook

Location
- Country: United States
- State: New York
- County: Delaware

Physical characteristics
- Source
  - coordinates: 41°59′29″N 75°17′21″W
- Mouth: Cadosia Creek
  - coordinates: 41°58′46″N 75°15′56″W
  - elevation: 988 ft (301 m)

Coon Hill Brook is a river in Delaware County, New York. It flows into Cadosia Creek in Cadosia.
