= Calamis (5th century BC) =

Sculptor of ancient Greece

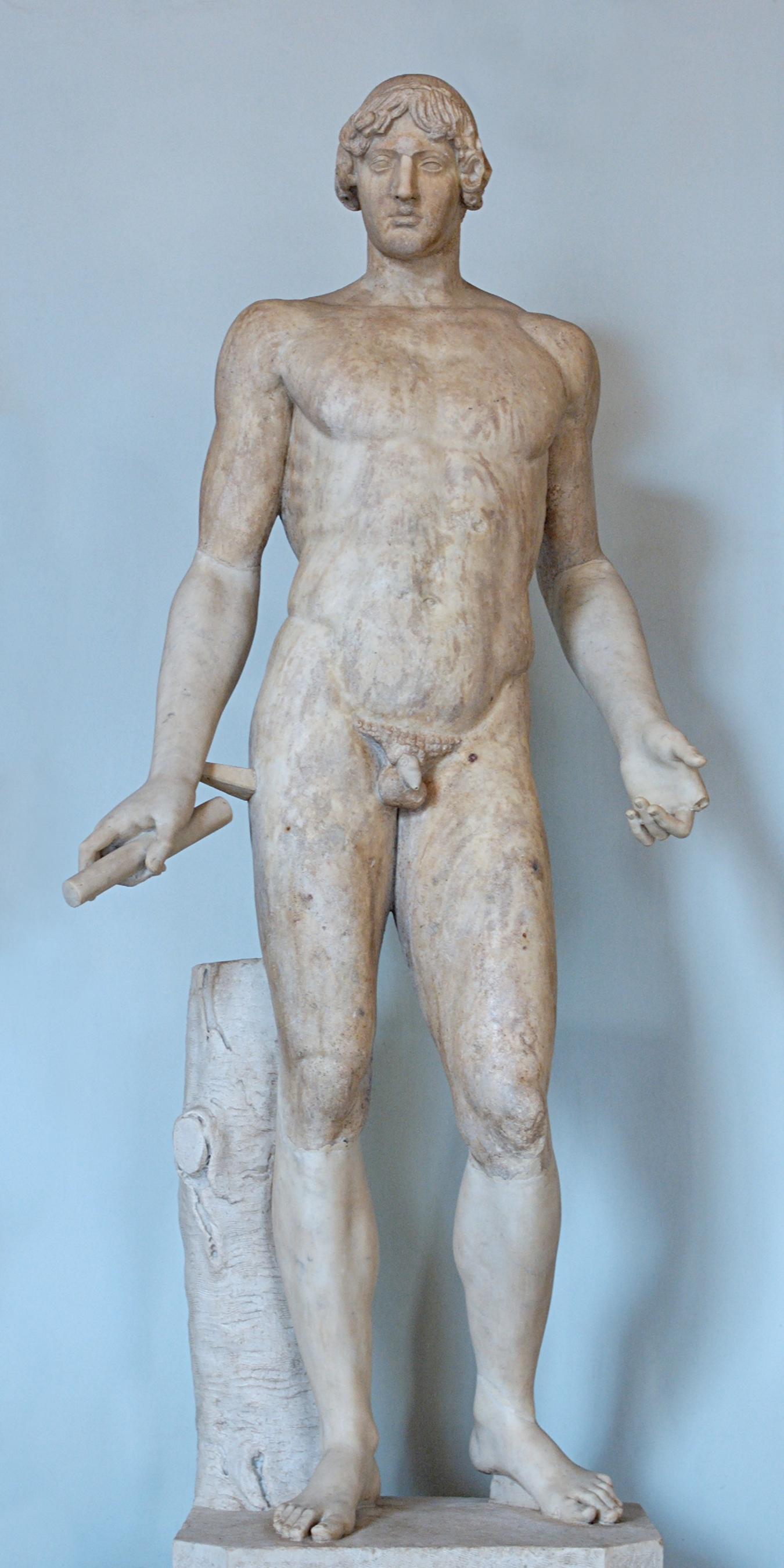
Omphalos Apollo, Roman copy, Capitoline Museums.

Calamis (Ancient Greek: Κάλαμις; fl. 5th century BC) was a sculptor of ancient Greece. He was possibly from Boeotia, but nothing certain is known of his life although he is credited with having lived in Athens, and his sculptures are representative of Athenian sculpture. Although none of his works survives, he is known for his talent and skill in sculpting animals, especially horses, as opposed to the human body. He is known to have worked in marble, bronze, gold, and ivory, and was famed for statues of horses, which Pliny says were unrivaled.

According to Pausanias (9.16.1), Calamis produced a statue of Zeus Ammon for Pindar, and mentions a Hermes Criophorus for Tanagra (9.22.1), which was later depicted on Roman coins of the city. His statue of Apollo Alexikakos stood in front of the Temple of Apollo Patroos in Athens. He produced his most ambitious work, a 30-cubit statue of Apollo for Apollonia Pontica (on modern St. Ivan Island, Bulgaria; Pliny the Elder 4.92, 34.39, Strabo 7.6.1, p. 319). His Sosandra was praised by Lucian, and may have been copied for Aspasia, which in turn was copied by the Romans.
