= Al Fisher Brook =

- Location of the mouth of Al Fisher Brook

Location
- Country: United States
- State: New York
- County: Delaware

Physical characteristics
- Source
  - coordinates: 41°59′53″N 75°14′52″W
- Mouth: Cadosia Creek
  - coordinates: 41°59′45″N 75°15′55″W
  - elevation: 1,060 ft (320 m)

Al Fisher Brook is a river in Delaware County, New York. It flows into Cadosia Creek north of Cadosia.
