= Argyle, Minnesota =

City in Minnesota, United States

Argyle
- City
- Motto: Small town living with big city access.
- Location in Minnesota
- Coordinates: 48°19′58″N 96°49′15″W
- Country: United States
- State: Minnesota
- County: Marshall
- Incorporated: 1883

Government
  - Mayor: Terry Sundby

Area
  - Total: 1.51 sq mi (3.91 km^{2})
  - Land: 1.51 sq mi (3.91 km^{2})
  - Water: 0 sq mi (0.00 km^{2})
- Elevation: 846 ft (258 m)

Population (2020)
  - Total: 544
  - Estimate (2021): 545
  - Density: 360.7/sq mi (139.25/km^{2})
- Time zone: UTC-6 (CST)
  - Summer (DST): UTC-5 (CDT)
- ZIP code: 56713
- Area code: 218
- FIPS code: 27-02134
- GNIS feature ID: 0639435
- Website: ci.argyle.mn.us

Argyle (/ˈɑːrɡaɪl/ AR-ghyle) is a city in Marshall County, Minnesota, United States, along the Middle River. The population was 544 at the 2020 census. Old Mill State Park is nearby.

== History ==
Before James J. Hill bought the Great Northern Railway in 1879 and accepted the task of completing the line from Crookston to the Canada–US border, a French-Canadian man founded a town named Louisa, after the French king, in the path of the railroad. However, Hill's company located the new railroad town just south of the Louisa property line and named it Argyle. The early settlement included many French-Canadians. Other settlers included immigrants from England, Norway, Poland, Sweden, Scotland, and Germany. The early townspeople and businessmen were always anxious to make Argyle an attractive community to the region. Today the community still boasts of several businesses, which draw customers from the regional area. Because of threats of flooding, a dike was built on the Middle River which is a branch of the Red River in 1988.

== Geography ==
According to the United States Census Bureau, the city has a total area of 1.00 square mile (2.59 km^{2}), all land. The city is located 40 miles from both Grand Forks, North Dakota and Thief River Falls. Argyle is also located 130 miles from Winnipeg, Manitoba and 360 miles from Minneapolis. The relatively flat area around Argyle is good for farming.

=== Climate ===
Climate data for Argyle, Minnesota, 1991–2020 normals, extremes 1890–2019
Month	Jan	Feb	Mar	Apr	May	Jun	Jul	Aug	Sep	Oct	Nov	Dec	Year
Record high °F (°C)	50 (10)	62 (17)	80 (27)	98 (37)	103 (39)	100 (38)	107 (42)	104 (40)	100 (38)	92 (33)	75 (24)	56 (13)	107 (42)
Mean maximum °F (°C)	37.1 (2.8)	41.5 (5.3)	54.0 (12.2)	77.2 (25.1)	86.9 (30.5)	89.8 (32.1)	91.8 (33.2)	93.6 (34.2)	88.3 (31.3)	76.2 (24.6)	56.6 (13.7)	39.2 (4.0)	95.8 (35.4)
Mean daily maximum °F (°C)	15.5 (−9.2)	20.9 (−6.2)	35.0 (1.7)	52.7 (11.5)	67.6 (19.8)	77.1 (25.1)	81.7 (27.6)	81.2 (27.3)	71.7 (22.1)	55.1 (12.8)	36.2 (2.3)	22.0 (−5.6)	51.4 (10.8)
Daily mean °F (°C)	5.4 (−14.8)	9.6 (−12.4)	23.9 (−4.5)	40.5 (4.7)	53.9 (12.2)	64.4 (18.0)	68.4 (20.2)	66.9 (19.4)	58.0 (14.4)	43.5 (6.4)	26.9 (−2.8)	13.0 (−10.6)	39.5 (4.2)
Mean daily minimum °F (°C)	−4.6 (−20.3)	−1.8 (−18.8)	12.8 (−10.7)	28.2 (−2.1)	40.2 (4.6)	51.7 (10.9)	55.2 (12.9)	52.6 (11.4)	44.2 (6.8)	31.9 (−0.1)	17.6 (−8.0)	4.0 (−15.6)	27.7 (−2.4)
Mean minimum °F (°C)	−27.6 (−33.1)	−24.1 (−31.2)	−10.5 (−23.6)	13.8 (−10.1)	26.3 (−3.2)	39.2 (4.0)	44.1 (6.7)	40.6 (4.8)	29.3 (−1.5)	16.8 (−8.4)	−3.2 (−19.6)	−19.9 (−28.8)	−31.1 (−35.1)
Record low °F (°C)	−43 (−42)	−48 (−44)	−38 (−39)	−18 (−28)	18 (−8)	26 (−3)	36 (2)	30 (−1)	19 (−7)	2 (−17)	−34 (−37)	−41 (−41)	−48 (−44)
Average precipitation inches (mm)	0.68 (17)	0.59 (15)	0.87 (22)	1.15 (29)	3.02 (77)	3.96 (101)	3.04 (77)	3.02 (77)	2.69 (68)	2.03 (52)	0.97 (25)	0.85 (22)	22.87 (582)
Average snowfall inches (cm)	9.0 (23)	7.2 (18)	6.7 (17)	2.7 (6.9)	0.1 (0.25)	0.0 (0.0)	0.0 (0.0)	0.0 (0.0)	0.0 (0.0)	1.5 (3.8)	5.5 (14)	10.9 (28)	43.6 (110.95)
Average extreme snow depth inches (cm)	10.2 (26)	10.2 (26)	9.1 (23)	2.1 (5.3)	0.0 (0.0)	0.0 (0.0)	0.0 (0.0)	0.0 (0.0)	0.0 (0.0)	1.1 (2.8)	3.8 (9.7)	7.1 (18)	13.7 (35)
Average precipitation days (≥ 0.01 in)	6.4	5.5	5.3	5.4	9.4	10.6	9.1	7.5	7.0	7.0	5.7	7.1	86.0
Average snowy days (≥ 0.1 in)	7.2	5.8	4.0	1.3	0.1	0.0	0.0	0.0	0.0	0.5	3.9	7.7	30.5
Source 1: NOAA
Source 2: XMACIS2 (mean maxima/minima, snow depth1981–2010)

== Demographics ==
Historical population
Census	Pop.	Note	%±
1890	306		—
1900	829		170.9%
1910	744		−10.3%
1920	956		28.5%
1930	700		−26.8%
1940	857		22.4%
1950	846		−1.3%
1960	789		−6.7%
1970	739		−6.3%
1980	741		0.3%
1990	636		−14.2%
2000	656		3.1%
2010	639		−2.6%
2020	544		−14.9%
2021 (est.)	545		0.2%
U.S. Decennial Census; 2020 Census

=== 2010 census ===
As of the census of 2010, there were 639 people, 261 households, and 175 families residing in the city. The population density was 639.0 inhabitants per square mile (246.7/km^{2}). There were 282 housing units at an average density of 282.0 per square mile (108.9/km^{2}). The racial makeup of the city was 96.7% White, 0.3% Native American, 2.2% from other races, and 0.8% from two or more races. Hispanic or Latino of any race were 2.7% of the population.

There were 261 households, of which 31.8% had children under the age of 18 living with them, 57.9% were married couples living together, 6.5% had a female householder with no husband present, 2.7% had a male householder with no wife present, and 33.0% were non-families. 31.0% of all households were made up of individuals, and 15.3% had someone living alone who was 65 years of age or older. The average household size was 2.43 and the average family size was 3.07.

The median age in the city was 42.3 years. 26.3% of residents were under the age of 18; 7.2% were between the ages of 18 and 24; 20.8% were from 25 to 44; 26% were from 45 to 64; and 19.7% were 65 years of age or older. The gender makeup of the city was 47.7% male and 52.3% female.

=== 2000 census ===
As of the census of 2000, there were 656 people, 255 households, and 179 families residing in the city. The population density was 424.9 inhabitants per square mile (164.1/km^{2}). There were 284 housing units at an average density of 184.0 per square mile (71.0/km^{2}). The racial makeup of the city was 95.27% White, 0.15% African American, 0.61% Native American, 0.15% Asian, 3.20% from other races, and 0.61% from two or more races. Hispanic or Latino of any race were 4.57% of the population.

There were 255 households, out of which 33.3% had children under the age of 18 living with them, 63.5% were married couples living together, 4.7% had a female householder with no husband present, and 29.8% were non-families. 28.2% of all households were made up of individuals, and 18.4% had someone living alone who was 65 years of age or older. The average household size was 2.54 and the average family size was 3.15.

In the city, the population was spread out, with 29.3% under the age of 18, 4.6% from 18 to 24, 24.5% from 25 to 44, 22.4% from 45 to 64, and 19.2% who were 65 years of age or older. The median age was 39 years. For every 100 females, there were 92.4 males. For every 100 females age 18 and over, there were 89.4 males.

The median income for a household in the city was $36,154, and the median income for a family was $42,361. Males had a median income of $31,985 versus $19,688 for females. The per capita income for the city was $15,974. About 13.6% of families and 15.2% of the population were below the poverty line, including 19.0% of those under age 18 and 22.9% of those age 65 or over.

== Education ==
The Argyle school was organized on March 16, 1880. The first school was started in May 1880. The first teacher was Miss Mary Dion and there were 18 people in that school. The new brick school was built and opened in 1905. Elementary wing and library was added in 1969. In 1974 a special election was held to get bonds for the construction and equipment for a new physical education facility.

The schools in Argyle and nearby Stephen began to share faculty in the early 1980s. The positions of Counselor, Learning Disabled Instructor and Speech were the first positions to be shared. Many more positions were shared. In the 1989–90 school year the school boards of both districts began meeting. Two public meetings in both communities were held in 1990 to begin the discussion of sharing the school districts. Ever since the meeting on January 30, 1996, the Stephen Tiger and the Argyle Eagle became united as one creating the Stephen/Argyle Central STORM. Stephen/Argyle is widely known for its high school football program, which won its first state championship in 1999 then 5 State Championships in a row from years 2003-2007 and again in 2009.
