= St. Anastasia Island =

Bulgarian islet in the Black Sea

St. Anastasia
Native name: Света Анастасия
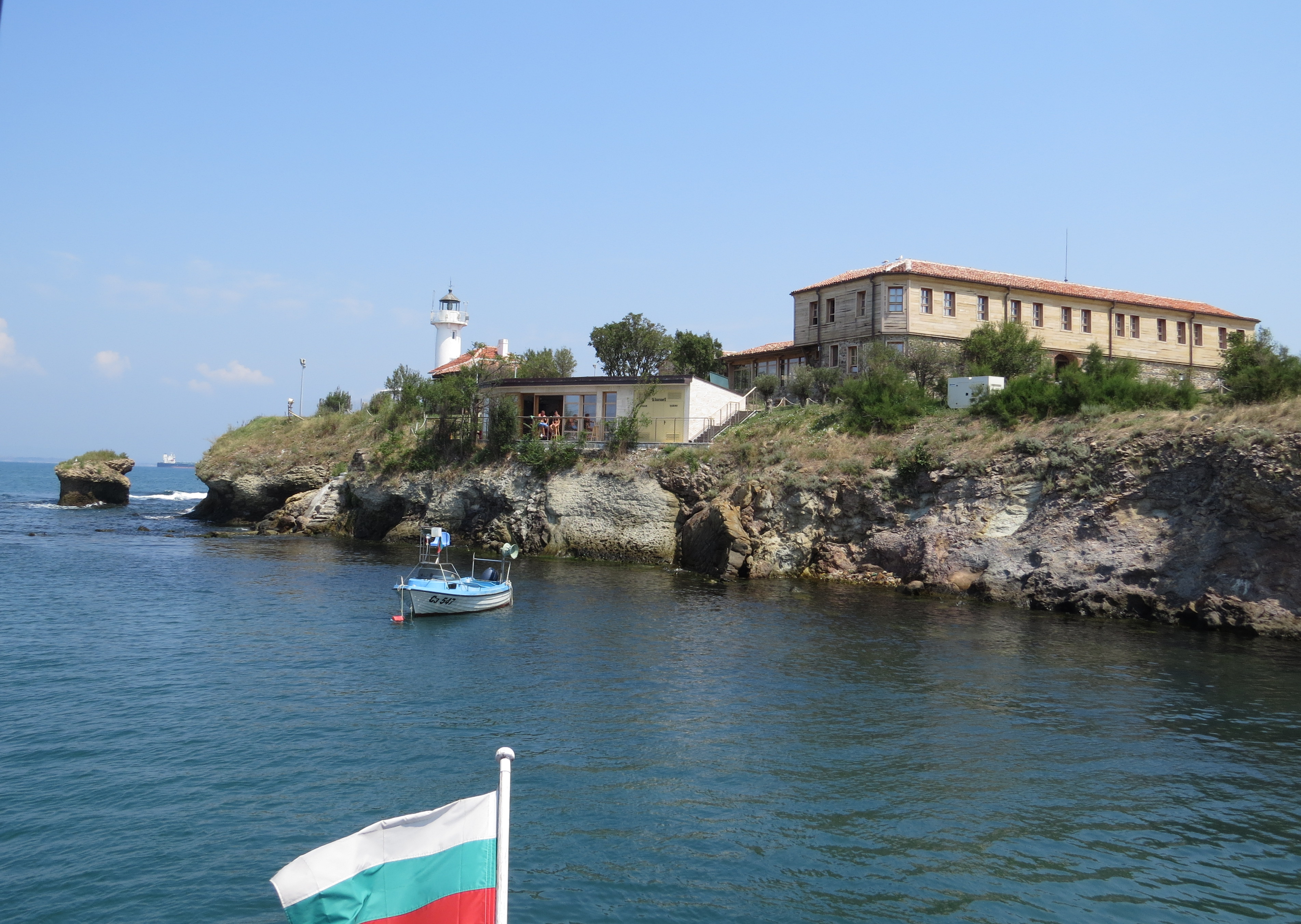
- Approaching St. Anastasia Island by boat

- Location within Bulgaria

Geography
- Location: Black Sea
- Coordinates: 42°28′05″N 27°33′11″E
- Area: 0.01 km^{2} (0.0039 sq mi)
- Highest point: 12 m

Administration
- Bulgaria
- Province: Burgas

St. Anastasia Island (Bulgarian: остров св. Анастасия, ostrov Sv. Anastasiya, formerly called Bolshevik Island, остров Болшевик) is a small Bulgarian island in the Black Sea. It is located in the Gulf of Burgas, 1.5 km off the coast near Chernomorets, at 12 metres above sea level, and covers a territory of one hectare. The island is built of volcanic rocks. It is the only inhabited island off the Bulgarian Black Sea Coast.

The island is supplied with electricity and drinking water. It is named after the former St. Anastasia convent located on it. The convent had existed since the Middle Ages and was reconstructed during the 18th-19th century. It has been abandoned since 1923, when the island was transformed into a prison.

In 1925, a group of 43 political prisoners (communists and anti-fascists), led by Teohar Bakardzhiev, revolted and escaped from the island, subsequently fleeing to the Soviet Union. In their honor, the island was renamed Bolshevik Island when the communists came into power in 1945. Bulgarian film director Rangel Valchanov based his 1958 film On The Small Island (Bulgarian: "На малкия остров") on this event.

A Bulgarian Burgas-based weekly newspaper, Factor, reported in 2006 that the Movement for Rights and Freedoms leader, Ahmed Dogan, visited the island and expressed desire to privatize it. The Bulgarian Orthodox Church, however, which claims the island is its property, objected.

Today, in addition to the monastery with its church, there is a lighthouse situated on the island, as well as a museum, a restaurant, a small quay, a conference hall and two guesthouses with a total of five rooms available to tourists. In the summer, the island is accessible from Burgas via boat services running back and forth multiple times a day.

== Gallery ==
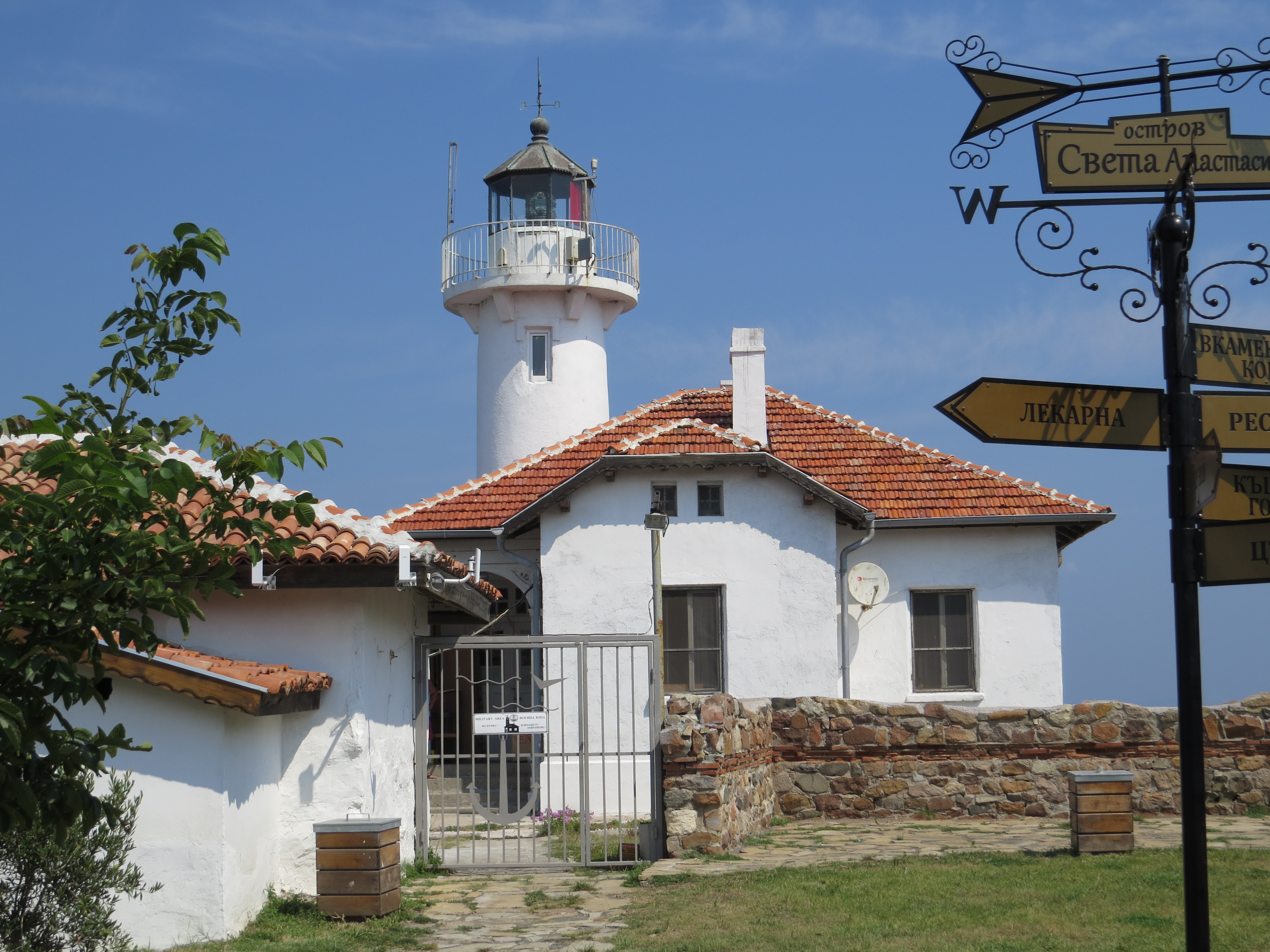
The lighthouse on the island in 2014

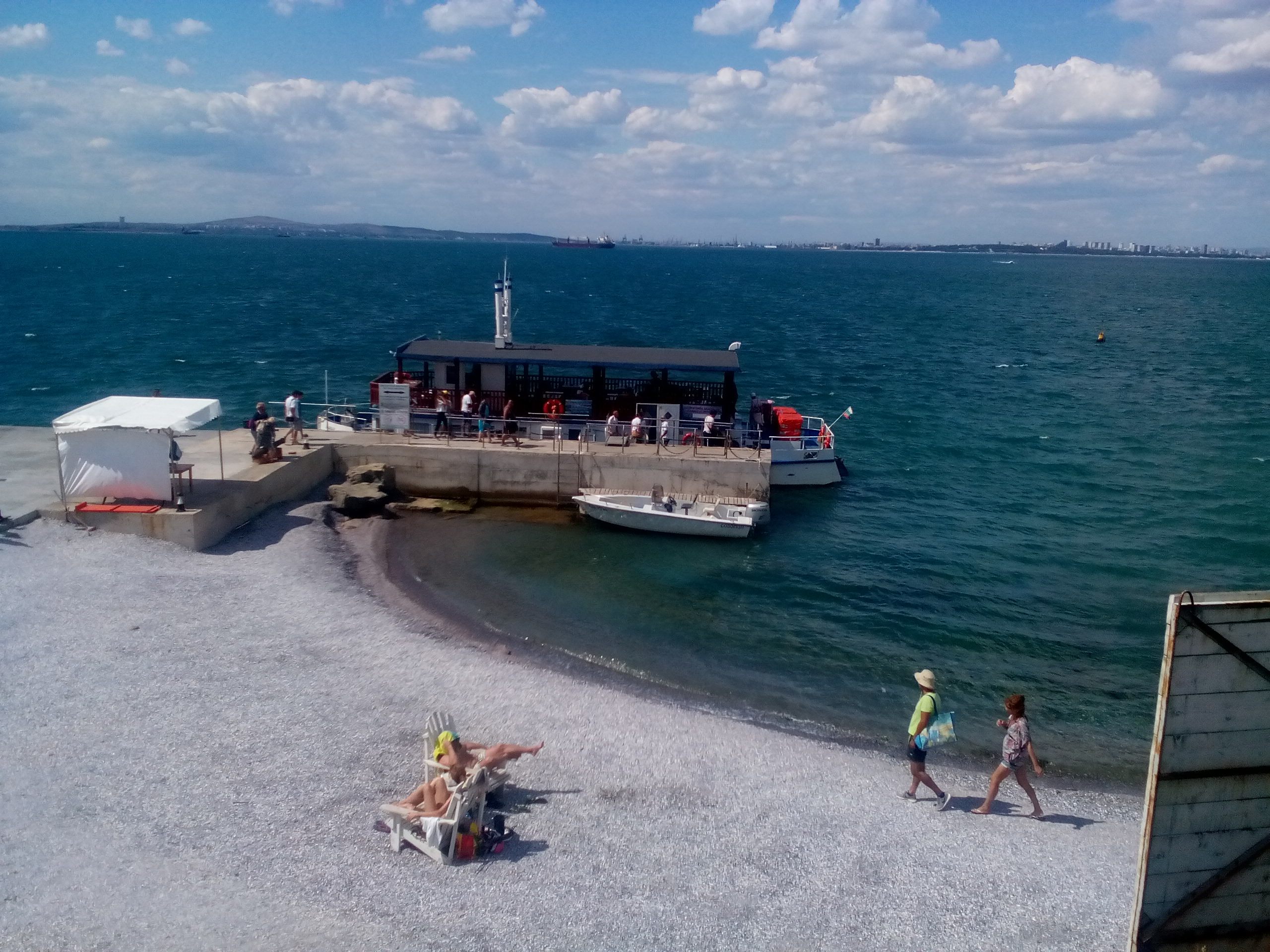
Beach and pier on the island of St. Anastasia. Burgas can be seen on the horizon

== See also ==
- List of islands of Bulgaria
- St. Ivan Island
- St. Cyricus Island
