= Gulf of Burgas =

Bay of the southwestern Black Sea

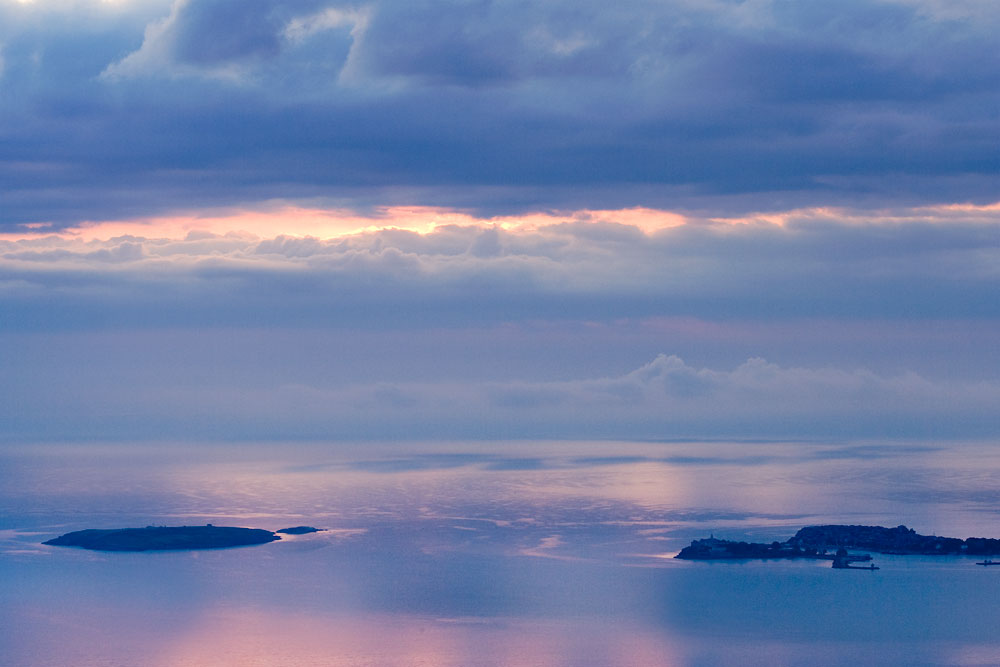
- Islands in the Gulf of Burgas

- Location within Bulgaria

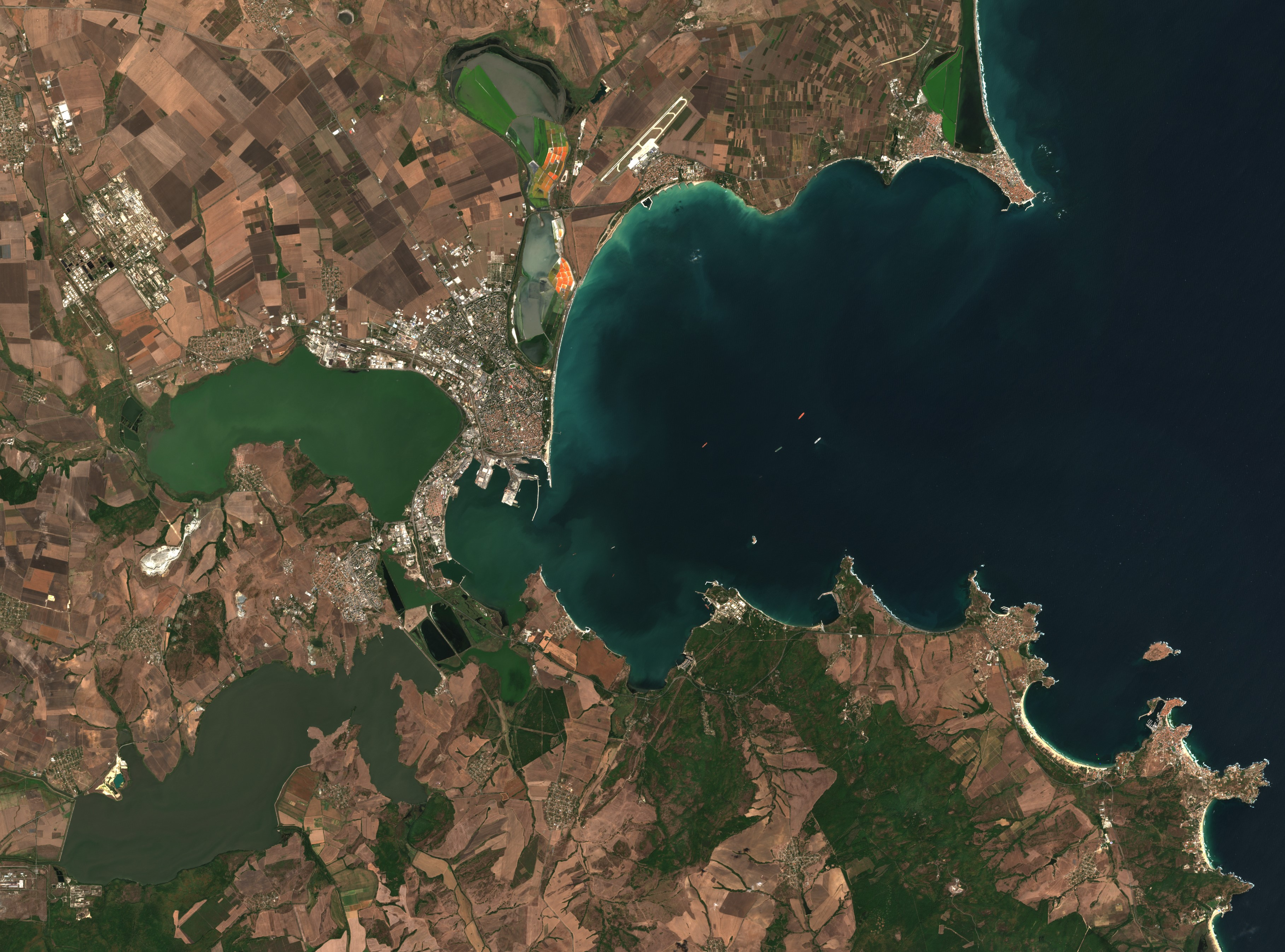
- Satellite view of the Burgas Bay
- Location: Black Sea
- Coordinates: 42°30′0″N 27°35′0″E
- Ocean/sea sources: Atlantic Ocean
- Basin countries: Bulgaria
- Max. length: 44 km (27 mi)
- Max. width: 41 km (25 mi)
- Max. depth: 25 m (82 ft)
- Salinity: 17 ‰
- Islands: St. Ivan Island, St. Peter Island, St. Anastasia Island, St. Thomas Island
- Settlements: Burgas, Pomorie, Nesebar, Sozopol

Gulf of Burgas or Burgas Bay (Bulgarian: Бургаски залив, Burgaski zaliv) between the coastline and the straight line joining Cape Emine and Cape Maslen nos is the largest bay of the Bulgarian Black Sea Coast and one of the largest in the Black Sea. The length of the gulf is 44 kilometres. It is 41 km at its widest and 25 m at its deepest, reaching 31 km at its greatest innermost extent, approximately where the Bulgarian city and major port of Burgas is located. Other towns in the region include Pomorie, Sozopol and Nesebar. The Burgas Bay is the Black Sea's westernmost point.

The bay gets narrow to the west. While the northern coast is lower and has two big peninsulas, at Nesebar and Pomorie, the southern part of the bay is rougher, with many little inlets and headlands. The water's salinity in the bay is 17‰; the sand is of magnetite origin. The Burgas Lakes are located in the wetlands to the west.

There are several small islands in the southern part of Burgas Bay, most notably St. Ivan Island and St. Peter Island, St. Anastasia Island (the old Bolshevik), St. Thomas Island (popularly the Snake Island).

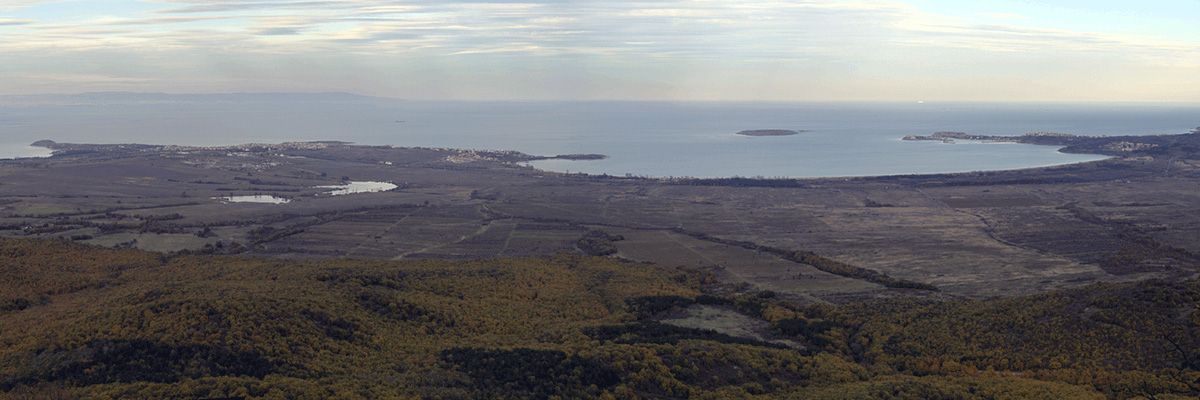
Panoramic view of the southern bay from Meden Rid

== Gallery ==
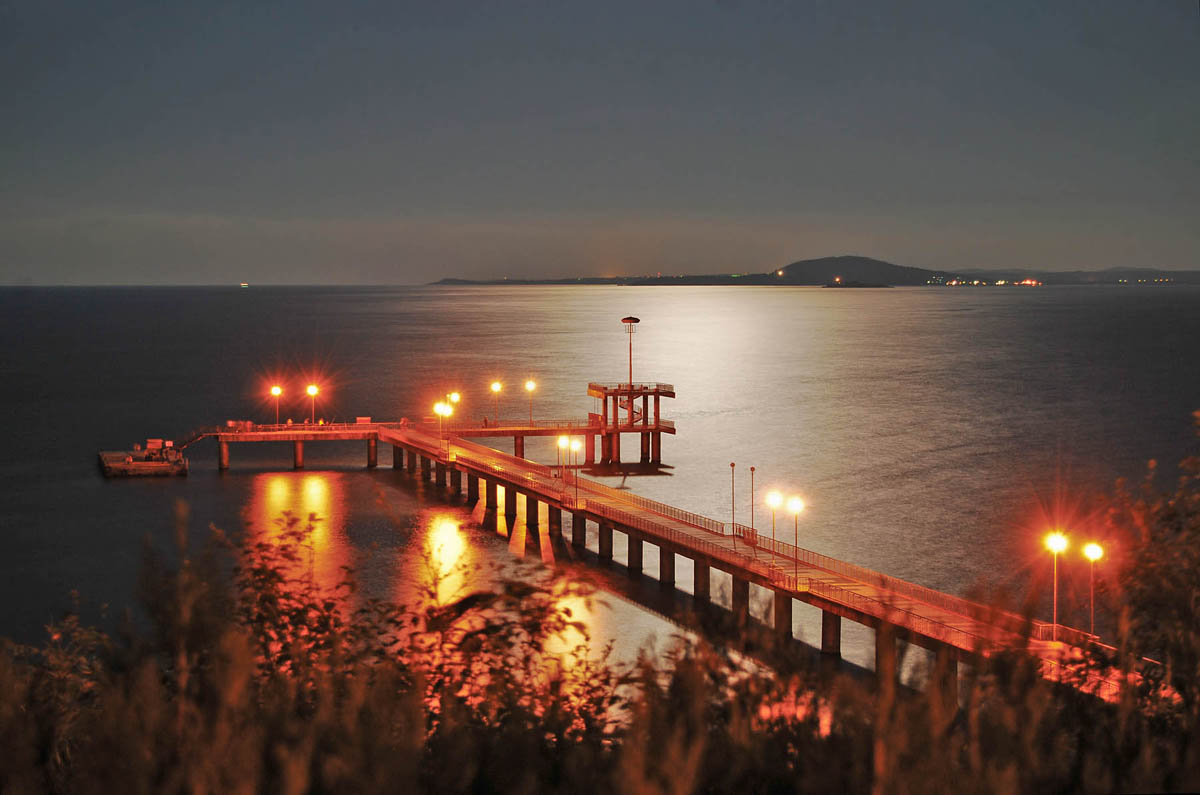
View of the bay at night
