= Alexicacus =

Ancient Greek mythological epithet

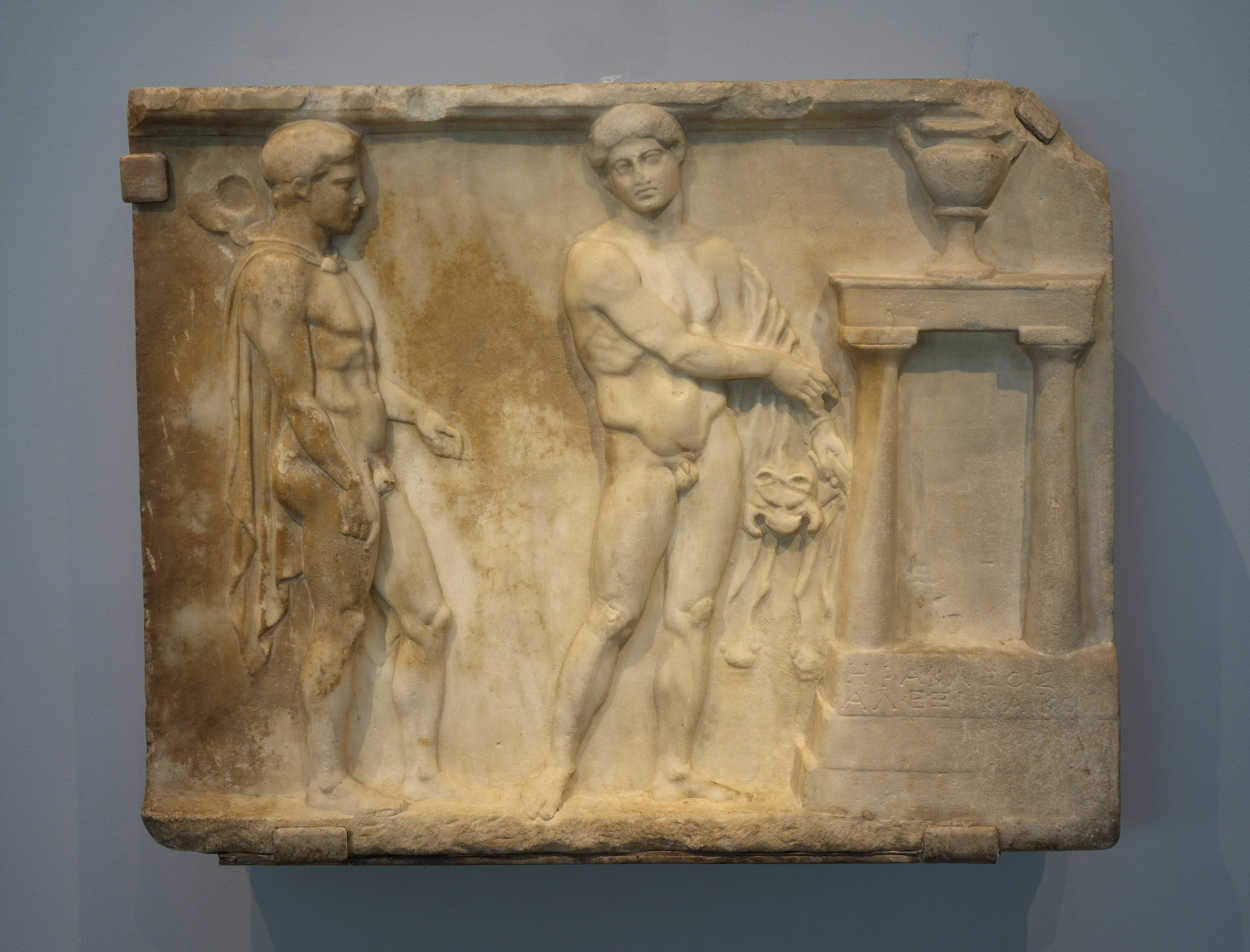
Ancient Greek votive relief to Heracles Alexicacos, 4th century BC, Boston Museum of Fine Arts.

Alexikakos (Ancient Greek: Ἀλεξίκακος), the "averter of evil", was an epithet given by the ancient Greeks to several deities such as Zeus and Apollo, who was worshipped under this name by the Athenians, because he was believed to have stopped the plague which raged at Athens in the time of the Peloponnesian War. It was also applied to Heracles.

There is a statue of Apollo in the Museo delle Terme in Rome, a Roman copy of a Greek original, that is thought to be a copy of the statue of Apollo Alexicacus by Calamis that stood in the Ceramicus of Athens.
