= Newfolden, Minnesota =

City in Minnesota, United States

Newfolden
- City
- Mottoes: "Best Kept Secret in Northern Minnesota" & "Rolling Pin Capital of Minnesota"
- Location of Newfolden, Minnesota
- Coordinates: 48°21′19″N 96°19′42″W
- Country: United States
- State: Minnesota
- County: Marshall

Area
  - Total: 1.02 sq mi (2.63 km^{2})
  - Land: 1.02 sq mi (2.63 km^{2})
  - Water: 0 sq mi (0.00 km^{2})
- Elevation: 1,096 ft (334 m)

Population (2020)
  - Total: 352
  - Density: 346.5/sq mi (133.78/km^{2})
- Time zone: UTC-6 (CST)
  - Summer (DST): UTC-5 (CDT)
- ZIP code: 56738
- Area code: 218
- FIPS code: 27-45520
- GNIS feature ID: 0648528
- Website: newfoldenmn.gov

Newfolden is a city in Marshall County, Minnesota, United States, along the Middle River. The population was 352 at the 2020 census. Old Mill State Park is nearby.

== History ==
A post office called Newfolden has been in operation since 1896. The city was named after the old Folden Municipality in Norway.

== Geography ==
According to the United States Census Bureau, the city has a total area of 0.89 square miles (2.31 km^{2}), all land.

== Demographics ==
Historical population
Census	Pop.	Note	%±
1920	246		—
1930	244		−0.8%
1940	300		23.0%
1950	367		22.3%
1960	370		0.8%
1970	390		5.4%
1980	384		−1.5%
1990	345		−10.2%
2000	362		4.9%
2010	368		1.7%
2020	352		−4.3%
U.S. Decennial Census; 2020 Census

=== 2010 census ===
As of the census of 2010, there were 368 people, 156 households, and 94 families residing in the city. The population density was 413.5 inhabitants per square mile (159.7/km^{2}). There were 176 housing units at an average density of 197.8 per square mile (76.4/km^{2}). The racial makeup of the city was 97.0% White, 0.3% African American, 2.2% Native American, and 0.5% from two or more races.

There were 156 households, of which 33.3% had children under the age of 18 living with them, 47.4% were married couples living together, 7.1% had a female householder with no husband present, 5.8% had a male householder with no wife present, and 39.7% were non-families. 35.9% of all households were made up of individuals, and 12.2% had someone living alone who was 65 years of age or older. The average household size was 2.36 and the average family size was 3.00.

The median age in the city was 33.8 years. 29.9% of residents were under the age of 18; 5.6% were between the ages of 18 and 24; 29% were from 25 to 44; 19.5% were from 45 to 64; and 15.8% were 65 years of age or older. The gender makeup of the city was 49.2% male and 50.8% female.

=== 2000 census ===
As of the census of 2000, there were 362 people, 160 households, and 94 families residing in the city. The population density was 404.9 inhabitants per square mile (156.3/km^{2}). There were 176 housing units at an average density of 196.8 per square mile (76.0/km^{2}). The racial makeup of the city was 99.17% White, 0.55% African American, 0.28% from other races. Hispanic or Latino of any race were 0.83% of the population.

There were 160 households, out of which 30.6% had children under the age of 18 living with them, 46.3% were married couples living together, 8.1% had a female householder with no husband present, and 41.3% were non-families. 39.4% of all households were made up of individuals, and 23.8% had someone living alone who was 65 years of age or older. The average household size was 2.26 and the average family size was 3.04.

In the city, the population was spread out, with 28.7% under the age of 18, 8.0% from 18 to 24, 22.9% from 25 to 44, 16.9% from 45 to 64, and 23.5% who were 65 years of age or older. The median age was 39 years. For every 100 females, there were 87.6 males. For every 100 females age 18 and over, there were 88.3 males.

The median income for a household in the city was $26,818, and the median income for a family was $37,917. Males had a median income of $26,071 versus $18,542 for females. The per capita income for the city was $14,195. About 6.1% of families and 12.0% of the population were below the poverty line, including 17.5% of those under age 18 and 19.8% of those age 65 or over.

== Schools ==
- Marshall County Central Schools is the local school district. Preschool through Grade 2 Elementary students attend school in the nearby community of Viking. Newfolden Elementary is the local Elementary School for 3-6 students. Marshall County Central High School educates the 7-12 grade students. The Northern Freeze is the school mascot of the school district sports teams. Marshall County Central Schools has a cooperative agreement with Tri-County Schools for all sports. Prior to the cooperative, the school mascot was the Nordics.

=== High School Fire ===
At 3:38 a.m. on November 7, 1991, a fire was reported at the Marshall County Central High School building that was built in 1974. Firefighters from five districts responded to fight the fire that burned for more than five hours Approximately 2/3 of the building was destroyed by the fire.

In a letter from the Minnesota Department of Education (MDE) and its commissioner, Gene Mammenga, dated November 13, 1991, the school board was officially informed that the school could not be rebuilt. In response, the town started a campaign to change his mind. They wrote letters and made phone calls to the MDE and the governor and created a petition. Ultimately, the campaign was successful and the rebuilding of the school was approved. Classes for the 210 7th-12th grade students were held in the town's community center and churches, and in parts of the elementary school across the street, until the new high school was completed in September 1992.

The fire marshal determined that the fire was caused by a defective switch in a Bunn coffee maker. In 1995 the school district won its case against Appellant Bunn-O-Matic Corporation and the 1996 appeal.

== Religion ==
The city has three Lutheran churches (one affiliated with the American Association of Lutheran Churches, one with the Association of Free Lutheran Congregations, and one with the Evangelical Lutheran Church in America), and an Evangelical Free Church of America.

== Climate ==
Due to its location in the Central Plains and its distance from both mountains and oceans, the city has an extreme continental climate. The city is known for its long, cold and snowy winters. In sharp contrast summers are warm to hot, and often quite humid with frequent thunderstorms. Spring and autumn are short and highly variable seasons.

Month	Jan	Feb	Mar	Apr	May	Jun	Jul	Aug	Sep	Oct	Nov	Dec
Avg high °F (°C)	12 (-11)	21 (-6)	34 (1)	53 (12)	70 (21)	77 (25)	81 (27)	80 (27)	68 (20)	54 (12)	32 (0)	17 (-8)
Avg low temperature °F (°C)	-6 (-21)	2 (-17)	15 (-9)	30 (-1)	43 (6)	52 (11)	56 (13)	55 (13)	45 (7)	33 (1)	17 (-8)	1 (-17)
Precip (in)	0.22	0.28	0.44	0.96	2.59	3.39	3.43	3.14	2.44	1.68	0.86	0.26
Source: weather.com
