= Middle River (Minnesota) =

- Mouth of the Middle River

Location
- Country: United States
- State: Minnesota
- County: Marshall County

Physical characteristics
- Source
  - coordinates: 48.4121932°N 96.0150143°W
- Mouth
  - coordinates: 48°22′17″N 97°04′47″W
- Length: 96 mi (154 km)

Basin features
- Progression: Middle River→ Snake River→ Red River of the North→ Lake Winnipeg→ Nelson River→ Hudson Bay
- River system: Snake River

The Middle River is a tributary of the Snake River in northwestern Minnesota in the United States. It flows for its entire length in Marshall County.

Middle River was so named from its location at the midpoint of the Pembina Trail.

== Course ==
The Middle River is 96 miles (154 km) long and drains an area of 324 square miles (840 km^{2}). It rises near the town of Middle River and flows generally westwardly past the towns of Newfolden and Argyle. At Old Mill State Park the river crosses an old beach of glacial Lake Agassiz. Much of the Middle River's lower course through the Red River Valley has been straightened and channelized; for approximately its final 10 miles (16 km), the Middle has been routed to flow due west in a straight line. It joins the Snake River not far upstream of that river's confluence with the Red River of the North.

== See also ==
- List of Minnesota rivers
- List of longest streams of Minnesota
