= Maslen nos =

Black sea cape

Coordinates: 42°18′27″N 27°47′32″E

Maslen Nos (Bulgarian Маслен нос) is a cape in the Black Sea. Located in the southeastern part of Bulgaria, it is the furthest southern point of Burgas Bay.

The cape projects about 4 km into the Black Sea and is the furthest eastern point of the Saddle Mountain Beach. It ends as a north-south peninsula about 3 km wide. The cape features a steep, rocky coast. Viewed from the river Ropotamo, Maslen Nos recalls the outline of a lion's head.

A chapel called Sveti Nikola, is located on the cape. Two miles north from Maslen nos is Cape Karaultasch.

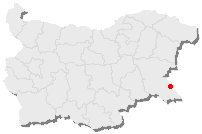
Map

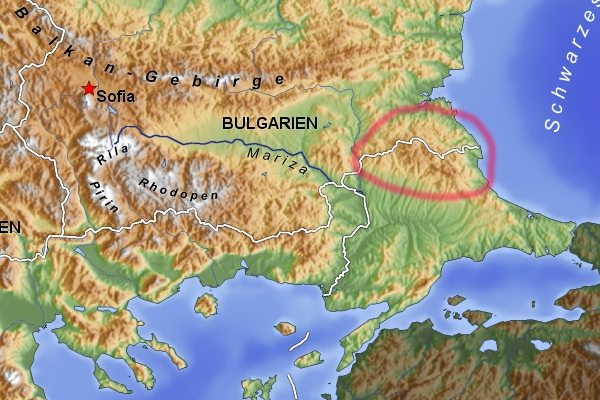
Map2

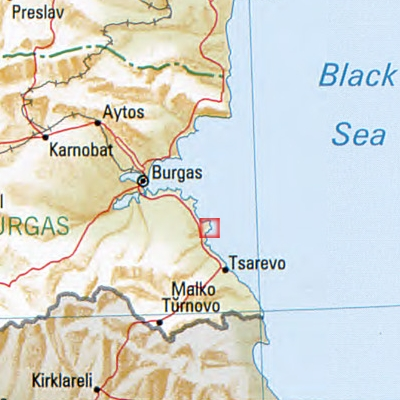
Map3

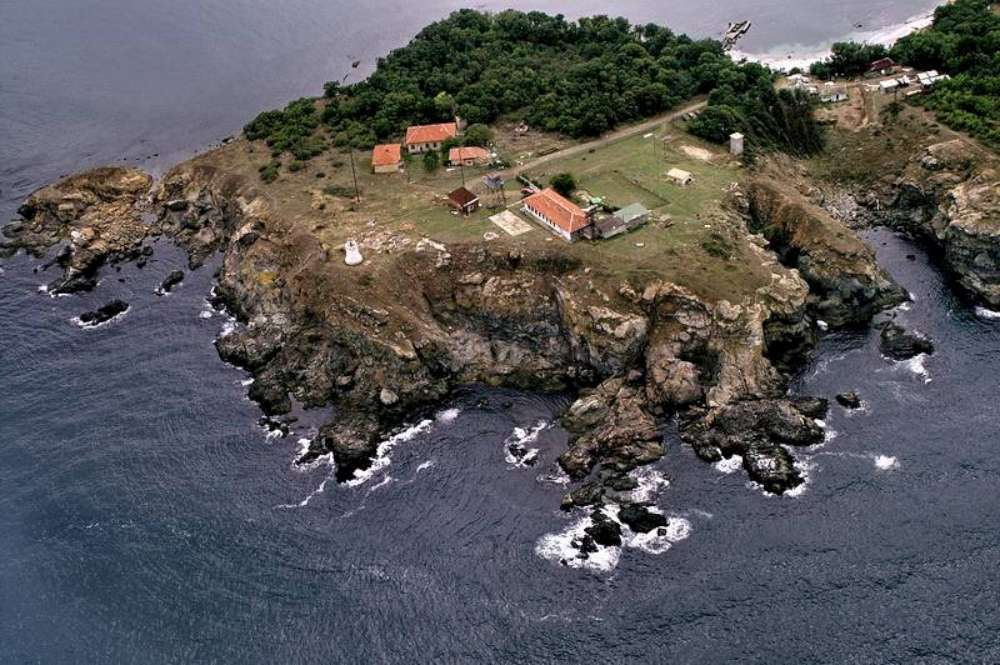
Aerial

== History ==
Maslen Nos featured a settlement that existed during the Hellenistic period.

Owing to the sharp rocks in the cape, Maslen Nos was notorious for ships that were wrecked there. The cargo of these ships consisted mainly of Amphorae, containing olive oil, confirmed by archaeological exploration, hence the name Maslen Nos (maslo = fat, oil; nos = nose, cape).

During the Ottoman Empire over this region (present-day Bulgaria) the cape was called Zeytin Burnu ("olive-bay" in Turkish). It was also referred to as 'olive oil' and 'to oil'. This is not to be confused with the Zeytinburnu district in Istanbul.

In some older atlases, it was incorrectly labeled Cape Maslen Nos, which translates into English as 'cape oily bay'.

=== Lighthouse ===
Because of its exposed location, the cape was recognised as a navigational menace from ancient times.

A bulletin of the lighthouse authority found in Istanbul on 6 December 1863 requests the coordinates of a constant red lighthouse on the cape to be recorded.

The height of the light above the sea level was said to be 10 metres and was visible at 6 nautical miles (NM).

The Julius Pintsch Company built a new lighthouse in 1930 on the cape, which remains in service. The lens is illuminated by a gas flame. The lighthouse is located 7 km north of Primorsko. The light is positioned 37.5 m above sea level. It has a range of 17 NM. It sends three white Flashes (duration 0.4 seconds, ) with a break between them of four, four, and eight seconds. The lighthouse is a round stone tower with a gallery, painted white, 6 m high (with the pedestal for the light at 7.5 m). The optics have to be manually turned on and then are rotated by a motor (a small gas engine running on coal gas before 25 July 1932 and acetylene gas thereafter.

The lighthouse is home (one room with kitchen) to a lighthouse keeper. In the small bay south of the cape, 500 m from the lighthouse is a small quay built of concrete. It was used to supply the lighthouse with fuel and food stocks as the lighthouse was often completely cut off, especially in winter.

=== Fog bell ===
South of the lighthouse, a 3m high square stone platform was built in 1937, on which a bronze fog bell was installed, to warn ships in foggy weather. The clockwork drive mechanism for the bell was housed in the stone. It had to be wound manually and the bell then rang for two hours.

In 1961, the lighthouse was part of a Bulgarian and Romanian Black Sea coast modernization program in which a power line was fed to the lighthouse and it became one of six radio beacons in the area: Cape Kaliakra, Snake Island, Sveti Georgi, Constanta, Cape Emine and Cape Maslen Nos.

Beginning in 1961 the beacons operated 24-hours per day, sending the identification letters "MN".

In 1968, an electric Optics M-300 was installed. The old equipment was preserved and has been on display since 1977 in the Marine Museum at Warne (Bulgarian Военноморски музей Варна).

In a small bay just southwest of the Cape, a Bulgarian underwater archeology expedition in 1960, led by Ivan Galabow (Bulgarian Иван Гълъбов), surveyed the bay. Their findings showed that dating from the 6th century BC, small ships sought refuge there. Relics from the Late Antiquity and the Middle Ages (5th to 14th century) were found there.

== Ropotamo River ==
The mouth of the Ropotamo river is 5 km northwest of the cape. Roman remains believed to be the ancient city of Ranuli. The river cuts through the slopes of the mountains from its source and winds through the Ropotamo Nature Reserve.

Maslen Nos and other parts of the peninsula have been inhabited since ancient times. In the area of the cape is the Thracian sanctuary Begliktasch (Bulgarian Таш Беглик), first discovered in 2003, 200 m inland from the cape.

== Fauna ==
Many snakes are found on the cape. Near the cape is a hard-to-reach cave whose entrance is accessible only by boat. It is inhabited by about 3,000 Long-eared and mouse eared bats). A rock called "Ostrak" (oyster), because it was once a thriving oyster colony has no more living oysters.
