= Snake River (Red River of the North tributary) =

Coordinates: 48°25′58″N 97°07′26″W

- Location of mouth

Location
- Country: United States
- State: Minnesota
- County: Marshall County, Polk County

Physical characteristics
- Length: 91 mi (146 km)

The Snake River is a tributary of the Red River of the North in northwestern Minnesota in the United States. It is one of three streams in Minnesota with this name (see Snake River (Minnesota)).

Snake River is the English translation of the native Ojibwe-language name.

== Course ==
The Snake River is 91.0 miles (146.5 km) long and with its tributaries drains a 1,324-square-mile (3,430 km^{2}) area. It flows for its entire length on the old lake bed of glacial Lake Agassiz, mostly in western Marshall County but also through a small portion of northwestern Polk County. After initially flowing southwestwardly from its headwaters, the Snake turns westward and collects a short tributary, the South Branch Snake River, and passes the towns of Warren and Alvarado. Downstream of Alvarado, the Snake turns north-northwestward, paralleling the Red River in the Red River Valley. Much of the river's course through the valley has been straightened and channelized. It collects the Middle River upstream of its confluence with the Red in Fork Township.

== See also ==
- List of Minnesota rivers
