= Chernomorets =

Chernomorets Черноморец
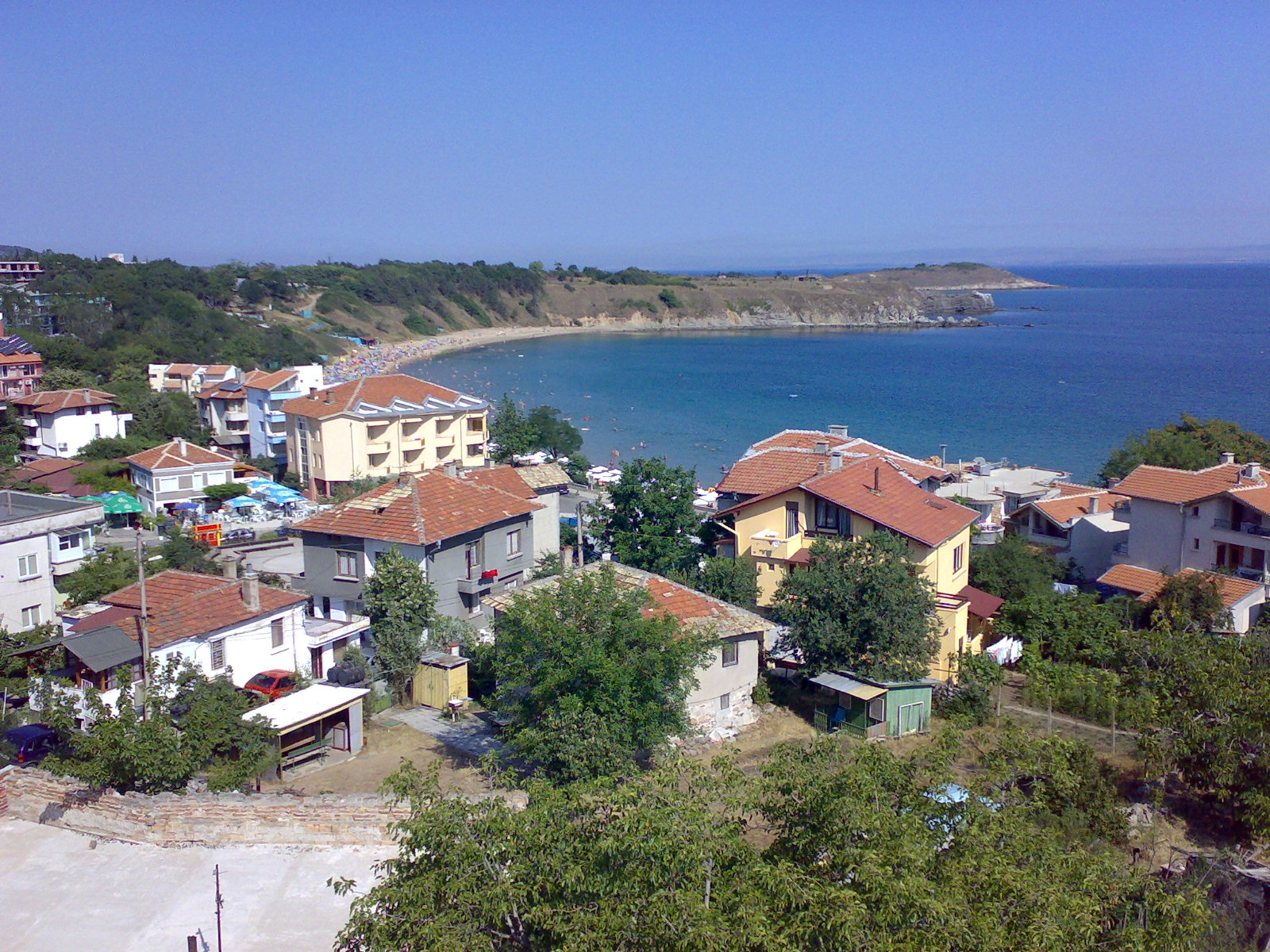

- Location of Chernomorets
- Coordinates: 42°27′N 27°39′E
- Country: Bulgaria
- Provinces (Oblast): Burgas

Government
  - Mayor: Rosen Despov
- Elevation: 0 m (0 ft)

Population (2009)
  - Total: 2,234
- Time zone: UTC+2 (EET)
  - Summer (DST): UTC+3 (EEST)
- Postal Code: 8142
- Area code: 0550

Chernomorets (Bulgarian: Черноморец [t͡ʃɛrnoˈmɔrɛt͡s]) is a town on the Black Sea coast of southeastern Bulgaria. Administratively part of Sozopol Municipality, Burgas Province, Chernomorets is a popular seaside resort.

Chernomorets lies some 24 kilometres (15 mi) southeast of the provincial capital Burgas, at the south coast of Burgas Bay, the Bulgarian Black Sea Coast's largest bay. Until 1951, it was known as Sveti Nikola (Свети Никола, "Saint Nicholas"). Chernomorets means "Black Sea man".

Previously a village, it received town privileges on 2 December 2009 on the grounds that it met the demographic and infrastructure requirements due to its resort status. The town has a primary school, a kindergarten, and a cultural centre (chitalishte).

Chernomorets lies at the low northern slopes of the Strandzha mountain, between Cape Emine to the north and the Arkutino marshland to the south. To the east is St. Ivan Island, with Sozopol to the southeast of the town along the seaside road.

Chernomorets has an Eastern Orthodox church dedicated to the town patron Saint Nicholas. A landscaped garden called the "Garden of Eden" lies just in front of it.

== Gallery ==
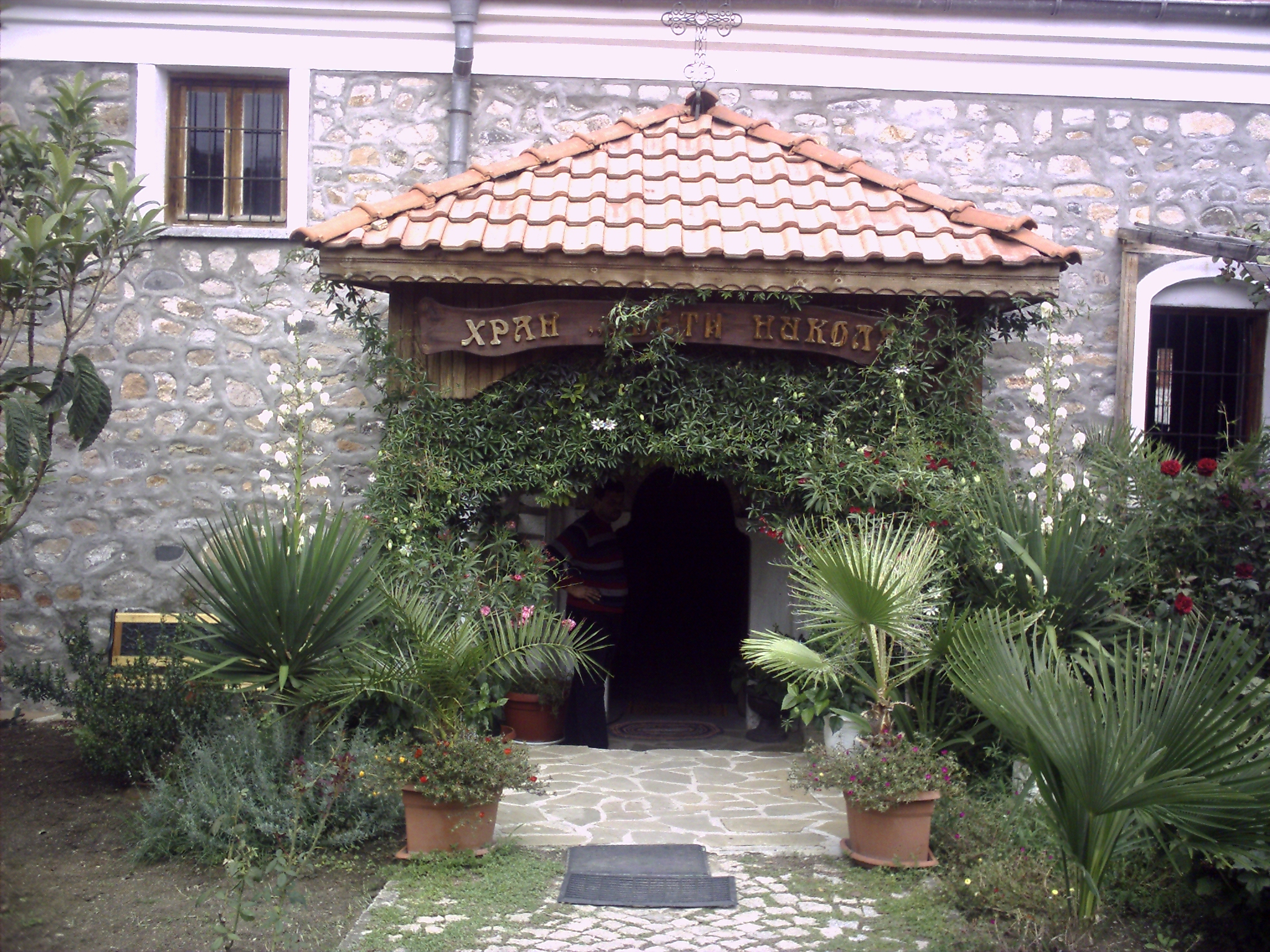
The Saint Nicholas Church

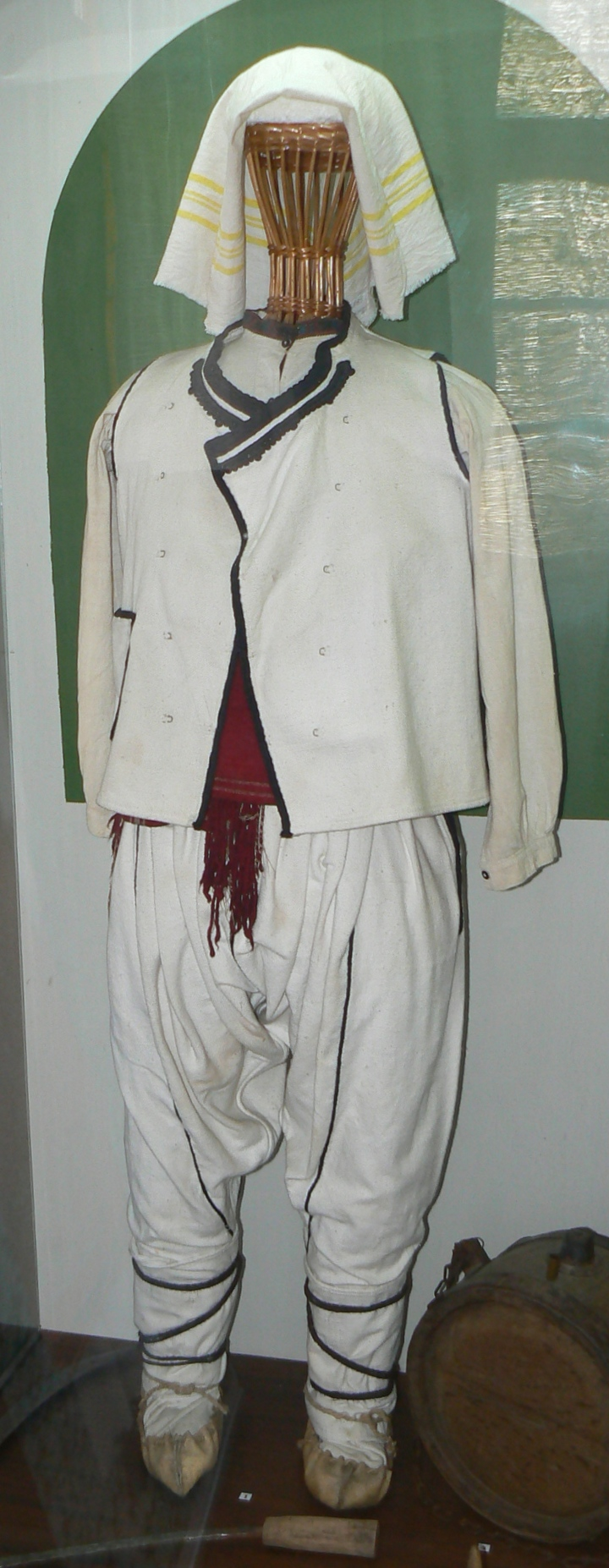
A traditional men's costume from the village

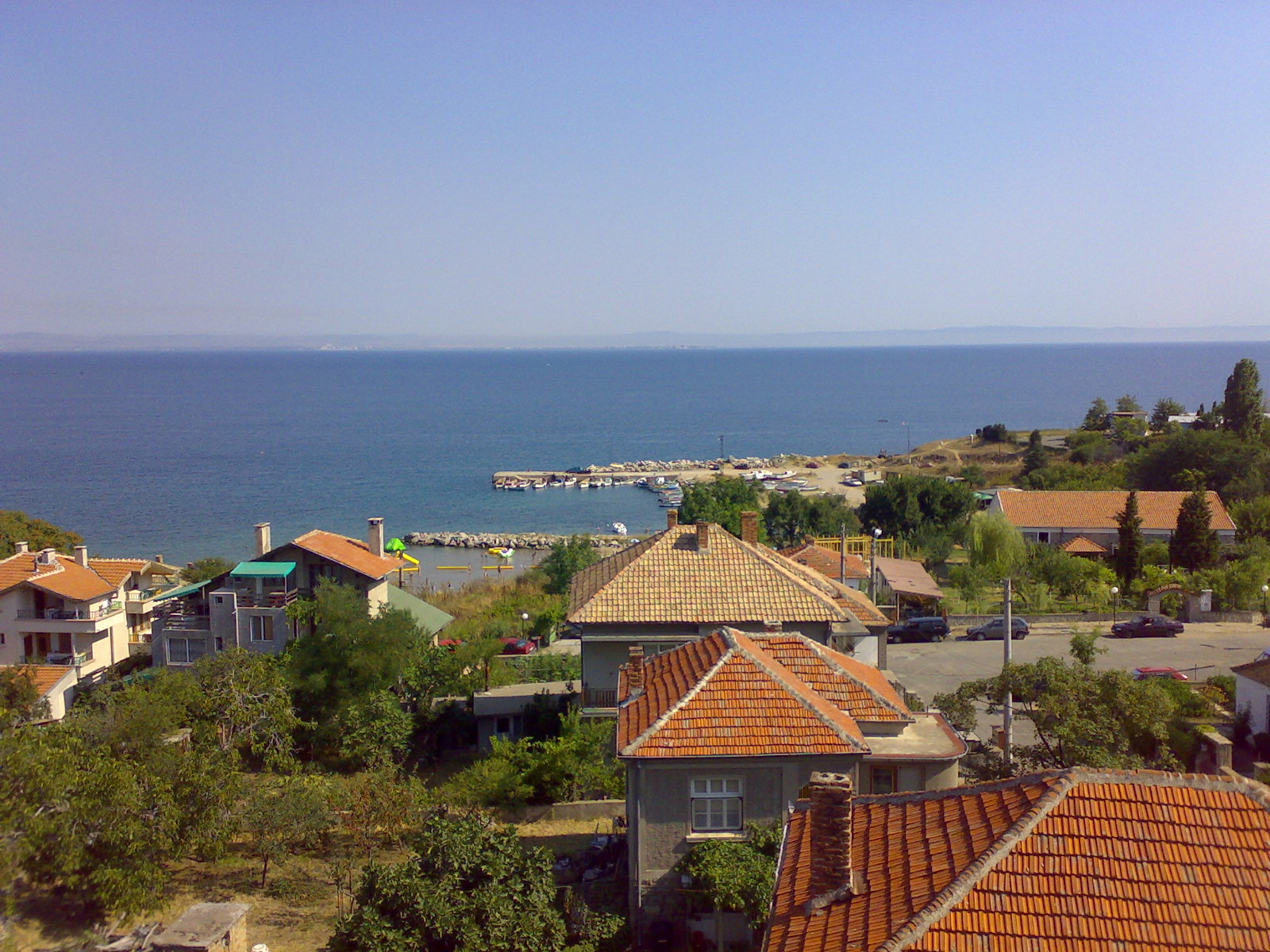
Overview of the town

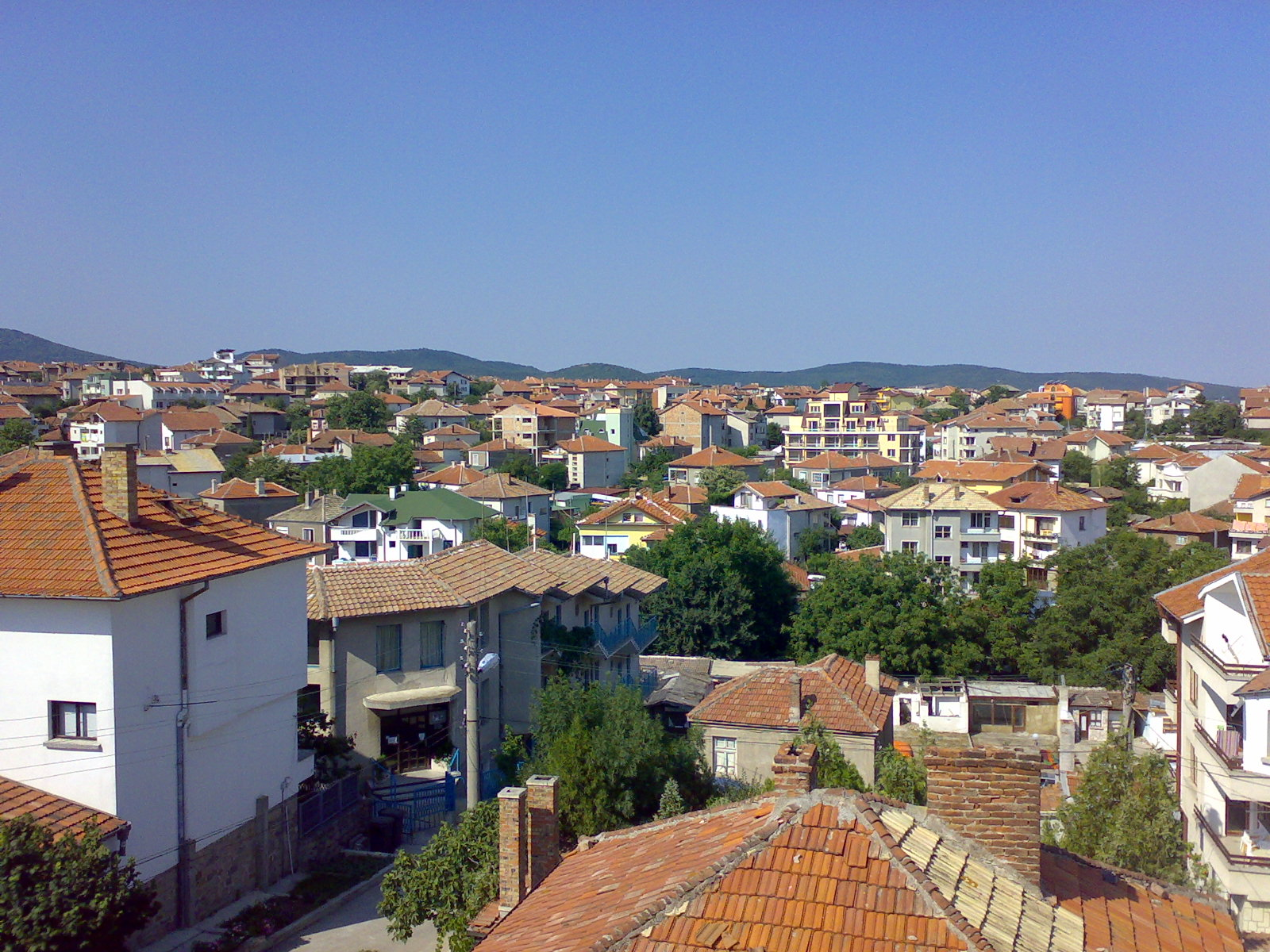
Overview of the town
