= Serpent Island =

Serpent Island may refer to:

- Serpent Island (film), a 1954 film directed by Tom Gries
- Snake Island (Black Sea), also known as Serpent Island
- Serpent Island (Mauritius), an island in Mauritius near Île Ronde, Mauritius

== See also ==
- Snake Island (disambiguation)
- Ultima VII Part Two: Serpent Isle, 1993 video game
