= Snake Creek (Missouri River tributary) =

Stream in South Dakota, U.S.

Coordinates: 43°23′33″N 99°07′30″W

Snake Creek is a stream in the U.S. state of South Dakota. It is a tributary of Missouri River.

Snake Creek received its name on account of its frequent meanders.

== See also ==
- List of rivers of South Dakota
