= Snake Creek (Grand River tributary) =

Stream in South Dakota, U.S.

Coordinates: 45°36′22″N 100°32′47″W

Snake Creek is a stream in the U.S. state of South Dakota. It is a tributary of Grand River.

Snake Creek was so named on account of its frequent meanders.

== See also ==
- List of rivers of South Dakota
