= Snake (Metal Gear) =

Snake is a codename given to several characters in the Metal Gear franchise, including the original Snake, his body double, his cloned sons, and a Patriots operative, the third of whom being the products of Les Enfants Terribles, a top-secret government project to artificially create soldiers:

- Big Boss / Naked Snake, real name John (sometimes referred to as Jack), an American Special Forces Operator and decorated war hero/mercenary
- Solid Snake, real name David, a cloned son of the original Snake and the first Snake introduced in the franchise, who is a former Green Beret and highly skilled special operations soldier/mercenary
- Liquid Snake, real name Eli, a cloned son of the original Snake, and the head of a rogue FOXHOUND unit
- Solidus Snake, a cloned son of the original Snake, who served as the President of the United States under the alias George Sears
- Raiden, real name Jack, an operative of The Patriots turned mercenary and former child soldier from Liberia, who briefly holds the codename Snake during the start of Metal Gear Solid 2: Sons of Liberty
- Punished "Venom" Snake, the body double of Snake (Big Boss), retroactively considered the Big Boss featured in the 1987 Metal Gear in place of the primary Big Boss/Snake
