= Batin Island =

Island in Bulgaria

Batin
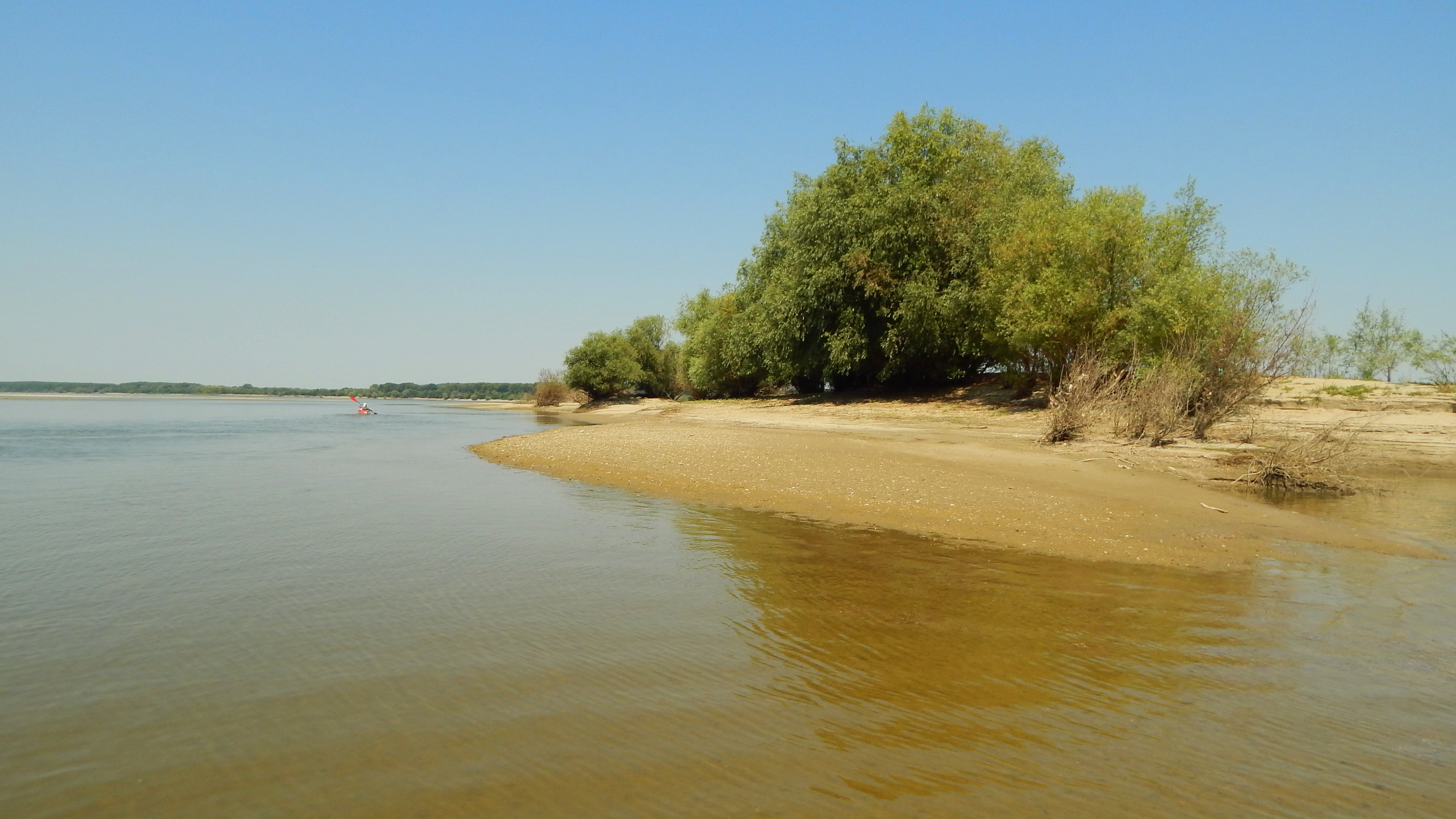
- Batin Island

- Location within Bulgaria

Geography
- Location: Danube River
- Coordinates: 43.679167°N 25.676389°E
- Area: 580 ha (1,400 acres)

Batin Island is an island located in the Danube River in Bulgaria. It is near the village of Batin, Bulgaria.
