= Snake Creek (Cadosia Creek tributary) =

River in Delaware County, New York, United States

- Location of the mouth of Snake Creek

Location
- Country: United States
- State: New York
- County: Delaware

Physical characteristics
- Source
  - coordinates: 41°59′32″N 75°14′35″W
- Mouth: Cadosia Creek
  - coordinates: 41°58′18″N 75°15′58″W
  - elevation: 942 ft (287 m)

Snake Creek is a river in Delaware County, New York. It flows into Cadosia Creek in Cadosia.
