= Snake Island (Tasmania) =

Island in southeastern Australia

Coordinates: 43°10′22″S 147°17′34″E

Snake Island is a small, low-lying island in southeastern Australia. It is part of the Betsey Island Group, lying close to the southeastern coast of Tasmania around Bruny Island, in the D'entrcasteaux channel.

== Flora and fauna ==
Trees on the island include Allocasuarinas and eucalypts. Pacific gulls have attempted to breed there.
