= St. Cyricus Island =

Island in Bulgaria

Coordinates: 42°25′12″N 27°42′00″E

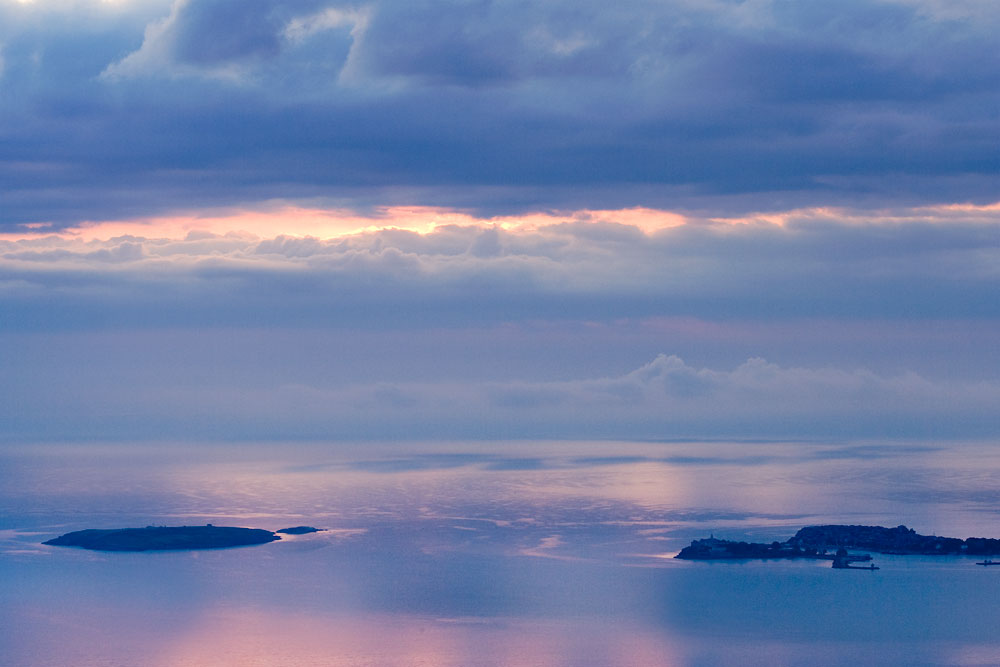
St. Cyricus Island (right) with St. Ivan Island and St. Peter Island (left)

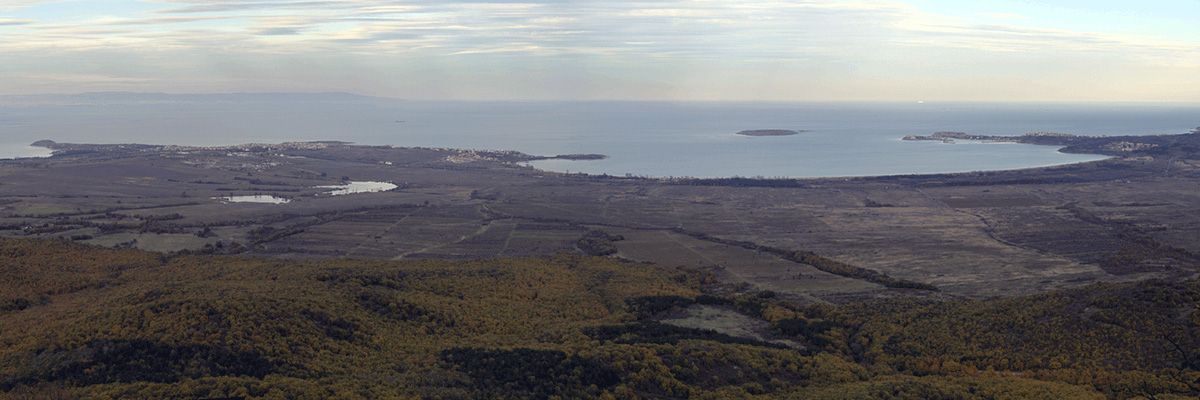
Panoramic overview of the Bay of Sozopol from Meden Rid, with St. Cyricus Island clearly visible

St. Cyricus Island (Bulgarian: остров св. Кирик, ostrov sv. Kirik), also known as St. Cyril Island or Sts. Quiricus and Julietta Island is a Bulgarian island in the Black Sea, 150 metres (490 feet) from Sozopol's Stolets peninsula. It has an area of about 0.08 square kilometres (0.03 square miles) and a height of 15 metres (49 feet). The island is connected to the continent by a road and a breakwater. Unlike most other Bulgarian Black Sea islands, its infrastructure is completely set up.

The island was named after the medieval Monastery of Sts. Quiricus and Julietta, the ruins of which still stand there. The monastery was subordinate to the major stauropegic monastery on the nearby St. Ivan Island.

In 1925-1926, a school for fishermen and sailors was built on the island, where only orphans were allowed to study. The school existed for 10 years. In 1936 its base was reorganized to accommodate the Bulgarian Naval Academy. Until recently, the island was a restricted area, where Bulgarian Navy ships were anchored.

St. Cyricus Island was demilitarized in the 2000s and is to become a centre of international maritime tourism. As it is a national cultural monument, its heritage will be preserved and the new buildings are required to match the characteristic style of Sozopol.

== See also ==
- List of islands of Bulgaria
- St. Anastasia Island
- St. Ivan Island
- St. Peter Island
