= The Snake (nickname) =

As a nickname, The Snake or Snake may refer to:

== Athletes ==
- Phil Baker (footballer) (born 1952), former Australian rules footballer
- Nate Bowman (1943–1984), American Basketball Association and National Basketball Association player
- Barry Fry (curler) (1939–2021), Canadian curler
- Nate Jones (boxer) (born 1972), American former Olympic and professional boxer
- Milan Jovanović (footballer, born 1981), Serbian former footballer
- Marco McDonald (born 1977), Jamaican footballer
- Ken Norman (born 1964), American retired National Basketball Association player
- Jacques Plante (1929–1986), Canadian Hall-of-Fame National Hockey League goaltender
- Jake Plummer (born 1974), American retired National Football League quarterback
- Don Prudhomme (born 1941), American drag racer
- Jake Roberts (born 1955), American retired professional wrestler
- Jerry Scanlan (1957–2015), American former football player
- James Silas (born 1949), retired American Basketball Association and National Basketball Association player
- Ken Stabler (1945–2015), American retired National Football League quarterback
- Tom Sturdivant (1930–2009), American Major League Baseball pitcher
- Snake Wiltse (1871–1928), American Major League Baseball pitcher

== Gangsters ==
- Thomas Kinney (1868–1912), Missouri state senator and gangster
- Carmine Persico (1933–2019), boss of the Colombo crime family in New York City

== Soldiers ==
- Dennis Chalker (born 1954), American retired US Navy SEAL, inventor and author
- Joseph Cheesman Thompson (1874–1943), US Navy medical officer and polymath
- Bruce P. Crandall (born 1933), retired US Army soldier awarded the Medal of Honor

== See also ==
- Sergio Mora (born 1980), Mexican-American former world champion boxer nicknamed "The Latin Snake"
- Donnie Nietes (born 1982), Filipino world champion boxer nicknamed "Ahas" (Tagalog for "Snake")
