= Snake River (disambiguation) =

The Snake River is a major river of the greater Pacific Northwest region in the United States.

Snake River may also refer to:

== Rivers ==
=== Canada ===
- Snake River (Sahtaneh River tributary), British Columbia
- Snake River (Renfrew County), Ontario
- Snake River (Yukon)

=== United States ===
- Snake River (Nome, Alaska)
- Snake River (Nushagak Bay), Alaska
- Snake River (Colorado)
- Snake River (Massachusetts)
- Snake River (Michigan)
- Snake River (Elk River), Minnesota
- Snake River (Isabella River tributary), Minnesota
- Snake River (Red River of the North tributary), Minnesota
- Snake River (St. Croix River tributary), Minnesota
- Snake River (Nebraska)

== Other uses ==
- Snake River High School, near Blackfoot, Idaho, U.S.
- Snake River Correctional Institution, men's prison in Malheur County, Oregon
