= Saint Peter Island (Bulgaria) =

Island in Bulgaria

Coordinates: 42.439°N 27.693°E

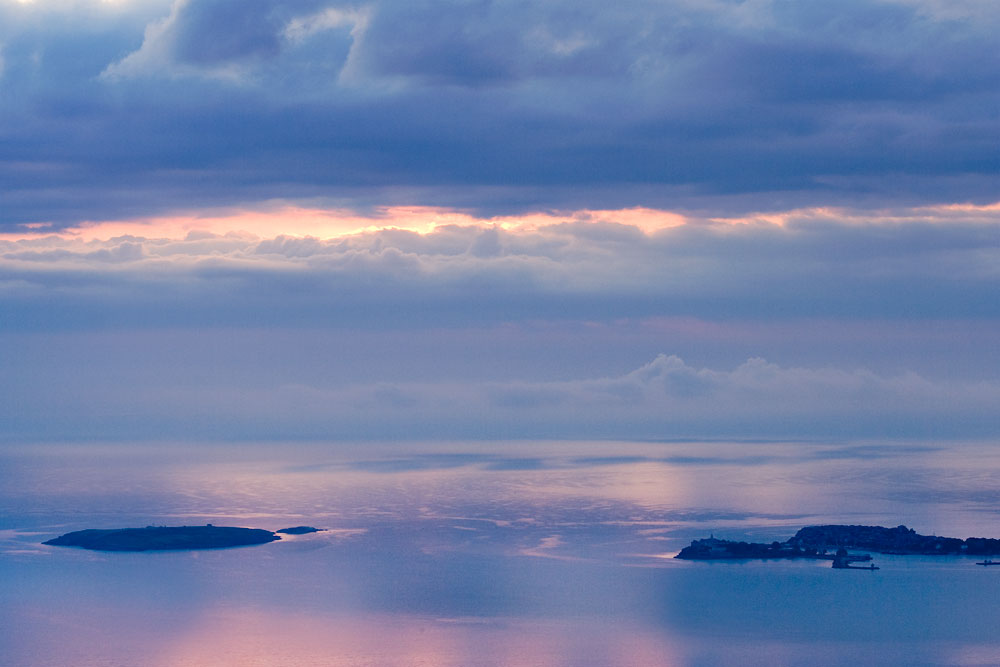
St. Peter Island is the little island just to the right of St. Ivan Island (left) in the Bay of Sozopol

St. Peter Island (Bulgarian: остров св. Петър, ostrov sv. Petar) is a Bulgarian island in the Black Sea, with an area of 0.025 square kilometres (0.010 square miles) and a height of 9 metres (30 feet) above sea level. Also known as Bird Island, it is located in the Bay of Sozopol, close to the St. Ivan and St. Cyricus Islands. As it was not mentioned in any sources until the mid-19th century, it is presumed to have separated from the larger St. Ivan Island (which is a few hundred meters to the west) as a consequence of some kind of natural phenomenon around that time. Archaeologists have discovered the ruins of a Bulgarian National Revival-time chapel, as well as traces of ancient pottery. Two small islets or large rocks also existed to the east of St. Peter, known by the names of Milos and Gata; they were last described by Russian war correspondents in the 1820s and have presumably submerged in the following years.
