= St. Ivan Island =

Island in Bulgaria

Native name: Остров св. Иван
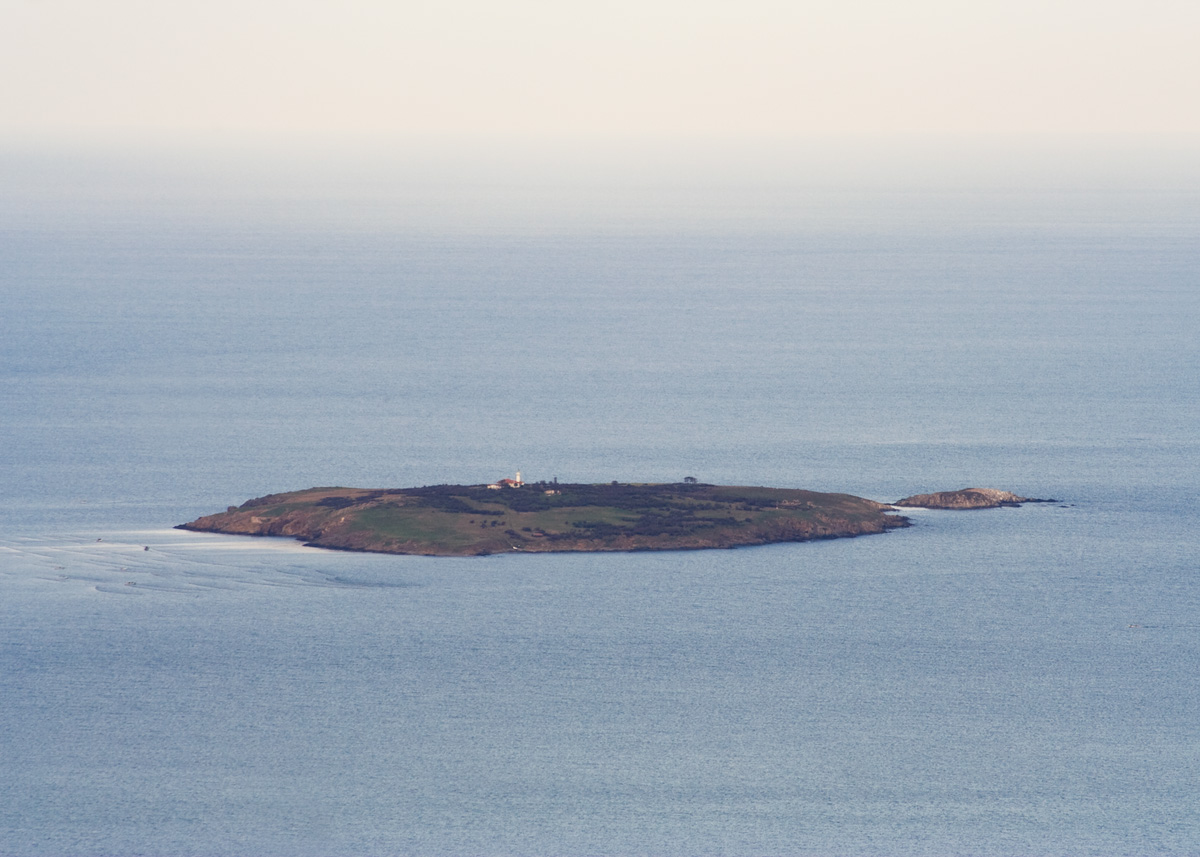
- St. Ivan and the adjacent St. Peter Island

- Location within Bulgaria

Geography
- Location: Black Sea
- Coordinates: 42°26′19″N 27°41′34″E
- Area: 0.66 km^{2} (0.25 sq mi)
- Length: 0.880 km (0.5468 mi)
- Width: 0.510 km (0.3169 mi)
- Highest elevation: 33 m (108 ft)

Administration
- Bulgaria

Demographics
- Population: 5 humans

St. Ivan Island (Bulgarian: остров св. Иван, ostrov Sveti Ivan) is the largest Bulgarian island in the Black Sea, with an area of 0.66 square kilometres (0.25 square miles). It lies off the Bulgarian Black Sea Coast near Sozopol, a town with rich history and a popular tourist place, and is separated by a strait several hundred metres long from the small neighbouring St. Peter Island. Standing at 33 metres (108 feet) above sea level, it is also the highest of the Bulgarian sea islands. It lies 920 metres (0.57 miles) from the Stolets peninsula, the location of Sozopol's Old Town.

== History ==
Around the 7th-4th century BC, the island was populated by Thracians. After Sozopol (Apollonia) was conquered by the Romans in 72 BC, a lighthouse was built on the island. Next to the Thracian sanctuary, the locals built a temple of Apollo featuring a bronze statue by Calamis standing 13.2 metres (43 ft) in height, making it easy to see from the city. A complex of buildings was constructed around the temple in the southeastern part of the island, including health stations, inns, etc.

After the conversion to Christianity, a monastical complex was built in the 5th-6th century on top of the ruins of the old Roman temple, including the Basilica of the Mother of God. Towards the 7th-9th century, the basilica was abandoned only to be reconstructed in the 10th century. The Monastery of John the Forerunner and the Baptist grew into an important centre of Christianity in the region; the buildings of the monastery and the church were reconstructed in 1262-1310. Archaeological research was carried out after 1985 for a couple of years, so today the remains of two churches, a royal residence, a library, part of the fortified wall with the gate and several monastic cells can be seen. The monastery was a stauropegic monastery of the Patriarchate of Constantinople, and two former patriarchs may have been buried there after being sent into exile.

Sozopol was conquered by the Ottomans together with Constantinople, in 1453, and the monastery was completely destroyed, but later reconstructed in 1467-1471. In the 1620s it was a refuge for Cossack pirates raiding the western Black Sea coast. Archaeologists have even discovered the remains of a Cossack feast in the church. The Ottomans destroyed the remaining buildings on St. Ivan Island in July 1629 in order not to be used by the pirates. It also played a part in the Russo-Turkish War of 1828-1829, when it was used as a field hospital for Russian soldiers suffering from cholera and also had a Russian graveyard.

Until the mid-19th century, when a natural phenomenon most likely separated them, the small St. Peter Island to the east of St. Ivan was most likely adjoined to it. Two small islets or large rocks also existed to the east of St. Peter, known by the names of Milos and Gata; they were last described by Russian war correspondents in the 1820s.

There is also a lighthouse constructed by French engineers in 1884 and pointing to the Burgas Bay still standing on the island. In the 1970s and early 1980s, there was a project to build a large Balkantourist hotel on St. Ivan, but Todor Zhivkov's intervention prevented that.

In August 2010 the BBC reported that remains of John the Baptist had been found on the island. Radiocarbon dating confirmed that the bones belonged to a man who had lived and died in the Middle East in the middle of the first century.

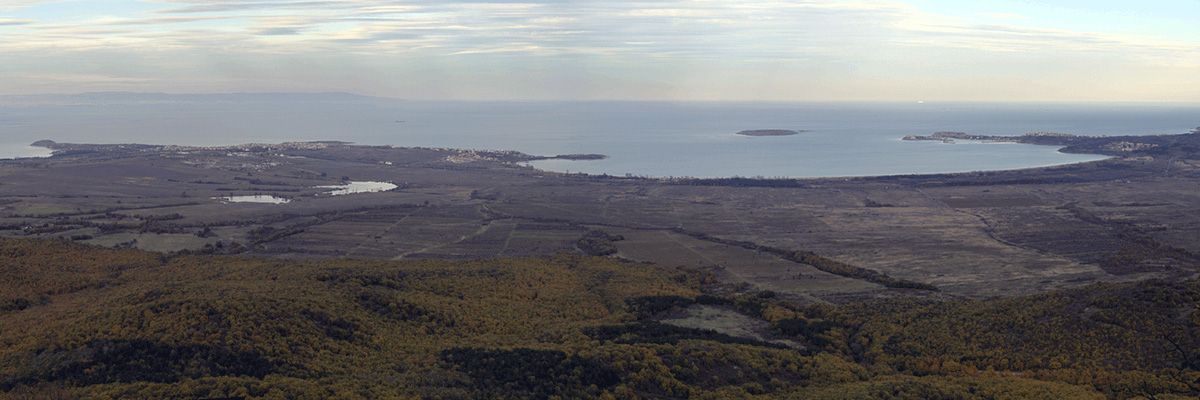
Panoramic overview of the bay from the ridge of Medni Rid, with St. Ivan Island clearly visible

== Nature ==
Apart from its historical significance, the island is also a protected area since 1993, with 72 species of birds nesting on the rocks and around the coast, 3 of which are endangered in the world and 15 in Europe. St. Ivan and the adjacent St. Peter Island host Bulgaria's largest colonies of Yellow-legged gull (Larus michahellis). The rocks on the island are covered with black mussels.The island is the only place in Bulgaria where underground rabbits live.

== Gallery ==
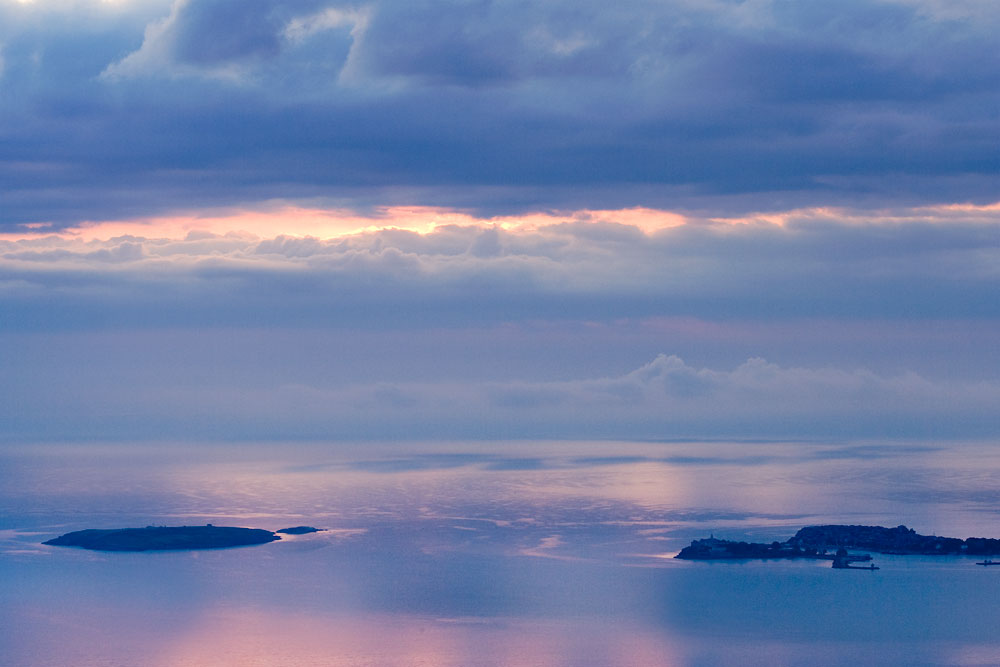
St. Ivan with St. Peter Island and St. Cyricus Island in the Bay of Sozopol

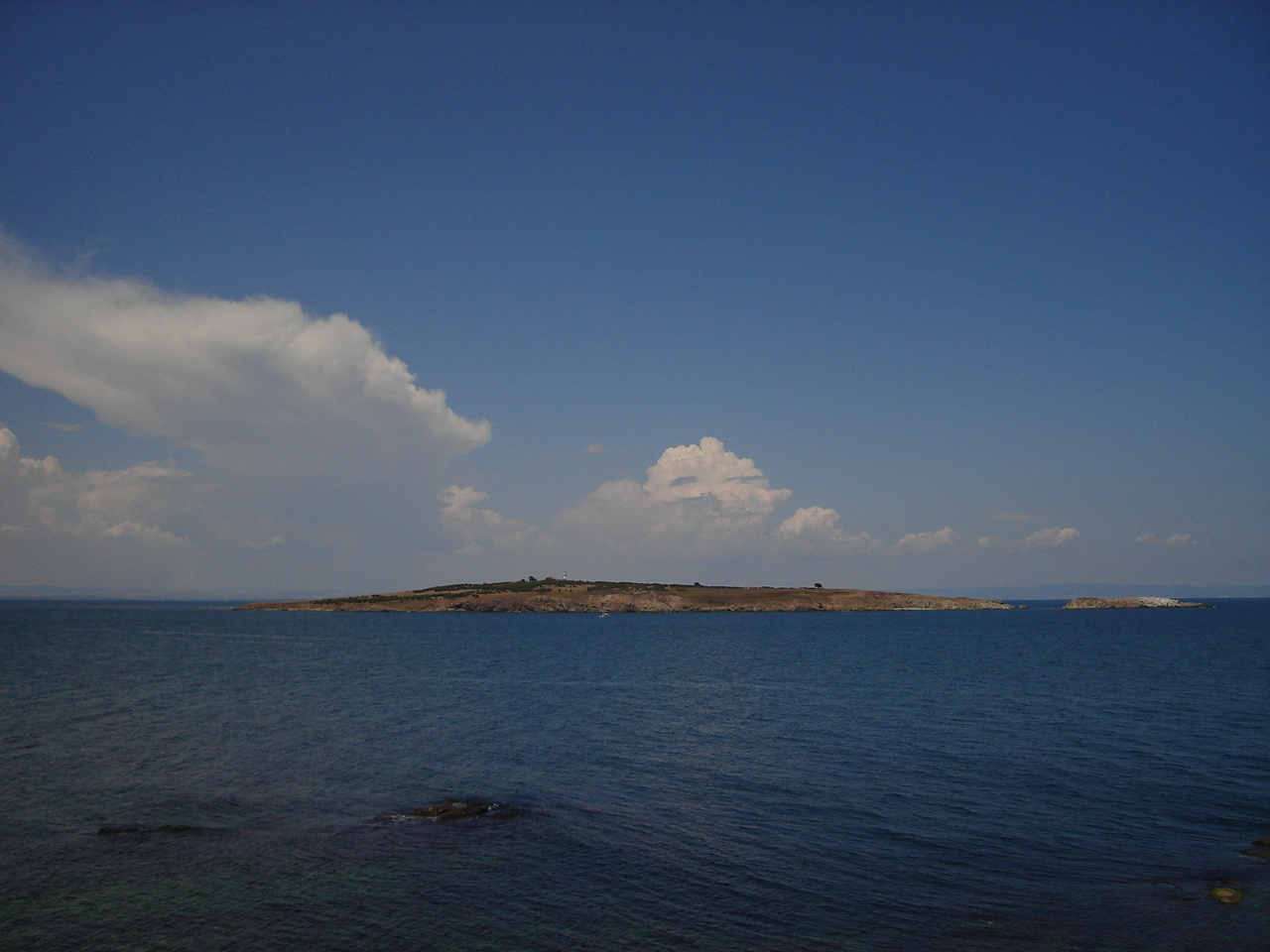
St. Ivan Island

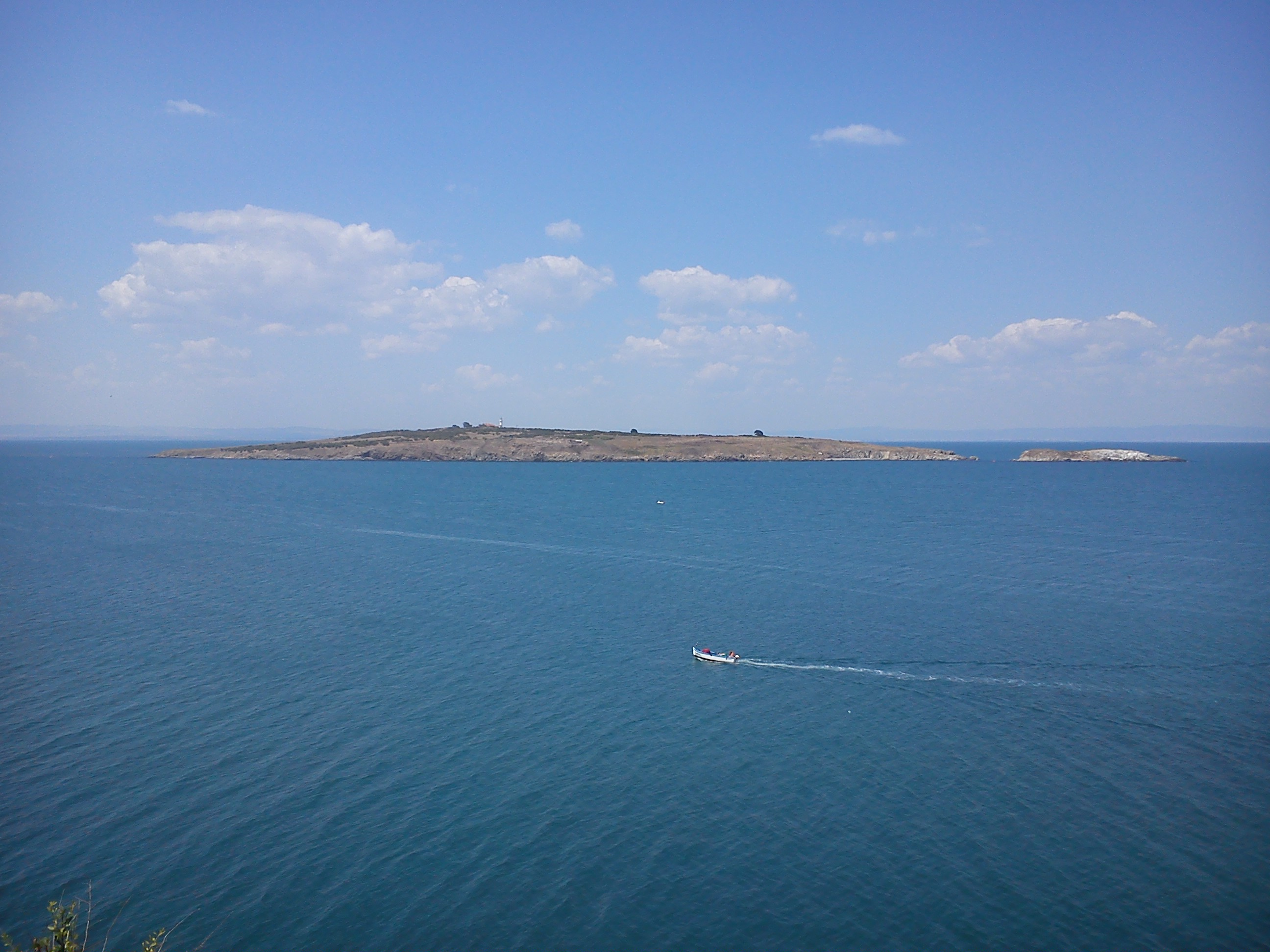
St. Ivan and St. Peter Island

== See also ==
- List of islands of Bulgaria
- St. Anastasia Island
- St. Cyricus Island
- St. Thomas Island

== Bibliography ==
- Petrinski, Ivan (2008). "Zdravi kreposti pazyat ostrovnite obiteli; Kazashki pir otbelyazva kraya na obitavaneto na o. Sveti Ivan". Istinskata istoriya na Balgariya (in Bulgarian). Sofia: Ciela. pp. 111–124. ISBN 978-954-28-0286-0.
