= National Register of Historic Places listings in Galax, Virginia =

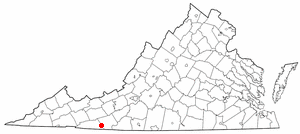
Location of Galax in Virginia

This is a list of the National Register of Historic Places listings in Galax, Virginia.

This is intended to be a complete list of the properties and districts on the National Register of Historic Places in the independent city of Galax, Virginia, United States. The locations of National Register properties and districts for which the latitude and longitude coordinates are included below, may be seen in an online map.

There are 5 properties and districts listed on the National Register in the city.

This National Park Service list is complete through NPS recent listings posted February 6, 2026.

== Current listings ==
	Name on the Register	Image	Date listed	Location	Description
1	Dr. Virgil Cox House	Dr. Virgil Cox House	May 19, 2004 (#04000476)	406 West Stuart Dr. 36°39′43″N 80°55′49″W	
2	Gordon C. Felts House	Gordon C. Felts House	February 5, 2002 (#01001572)	404 N. Main St. 36°39′53″N 80°55′36″W	
3	Galax Commercial Historic District	Galax Commercial Historic District	May 30, 2002 (#02000593)	Roughly Main, Center, Grayson, Carroll, and Oldtown Sts.; also 107 W. Oldtown St. 36°39′43″N 80°55′29″W	107 Oldtown represents a boundary increase of November 12, 2008
4	A. G. Pless Jr. House	A. G. Pless Jr. House	May 16, 2002 (#02000526)	942 Glendale Rd. 36°41′00″N 80°54′05″W	
5	Rosenwald-Felts School		November 15, 2024 (#100010993)	105 Rosenwald Felts Drive; 36°40′08″N 80°54′39″W	

== See also ==
- List of National Historic Landmarks in Virginia
- National Register of Historic Places listings in Virginia
