= Garry & Sheffey =

American architectural firm (1920–1941)

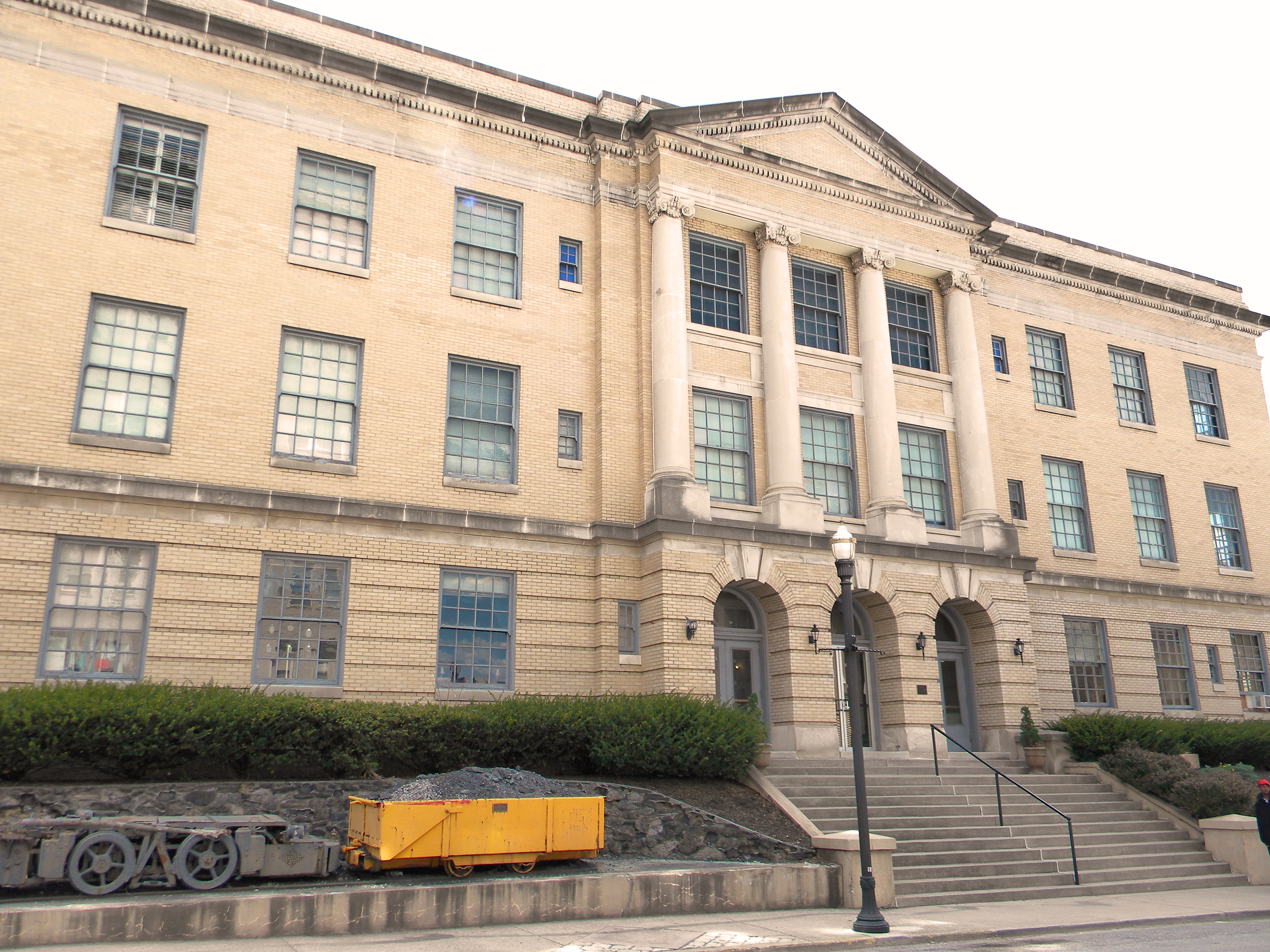
Municipal Building, Bluefield, 1924.

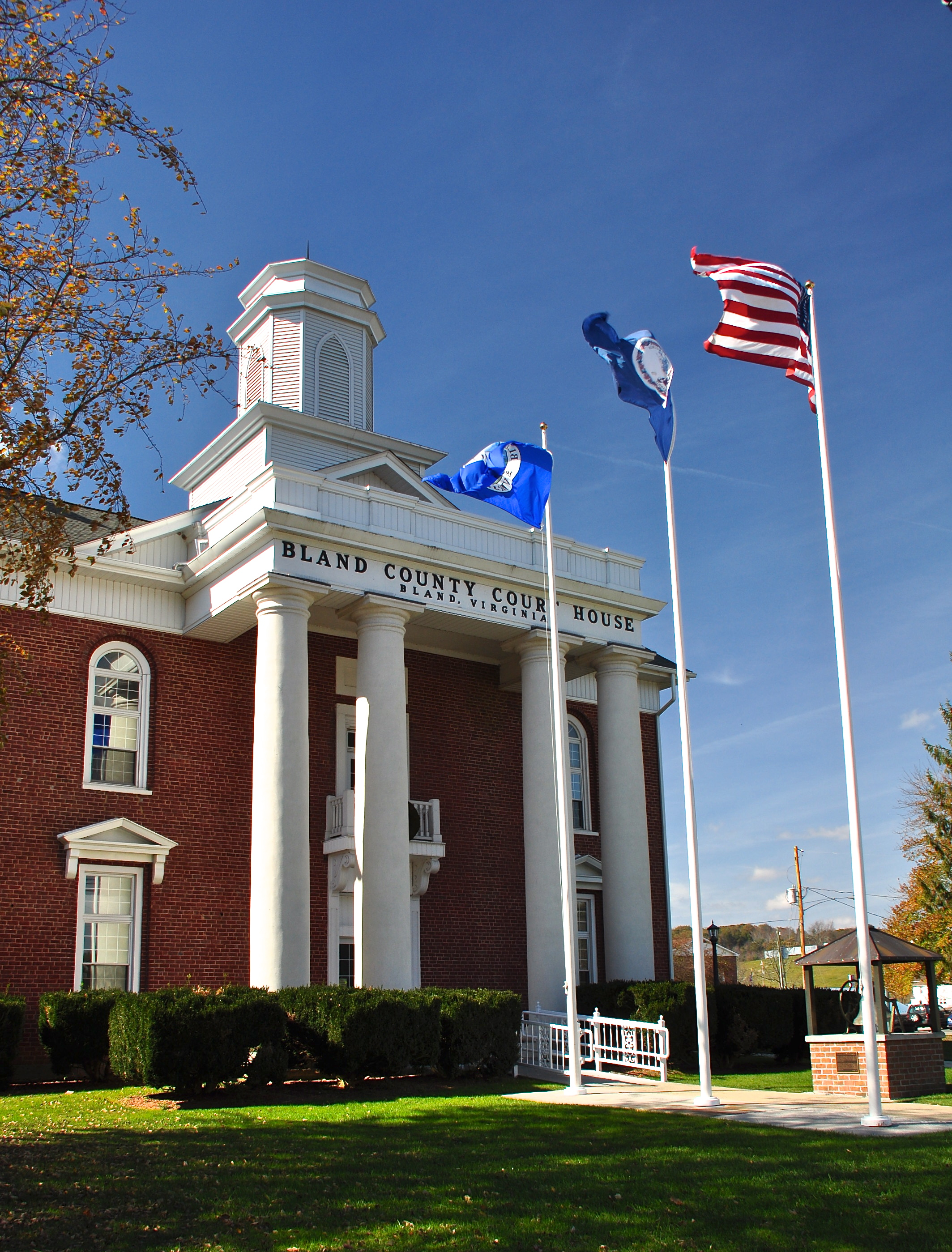
County Courthouse, Bland, 1929.

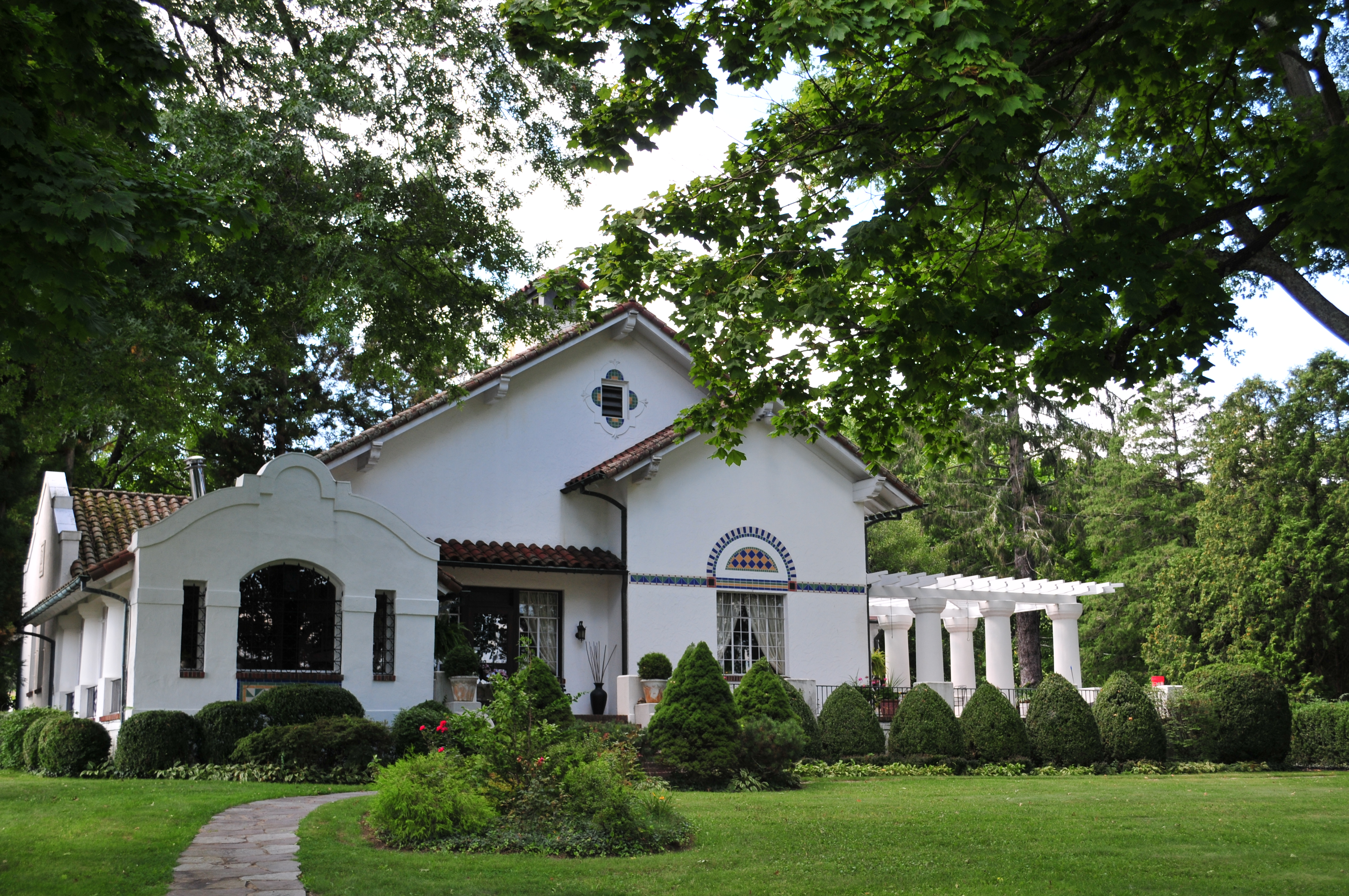
Gordon C. Felts House, Galax, 1930.

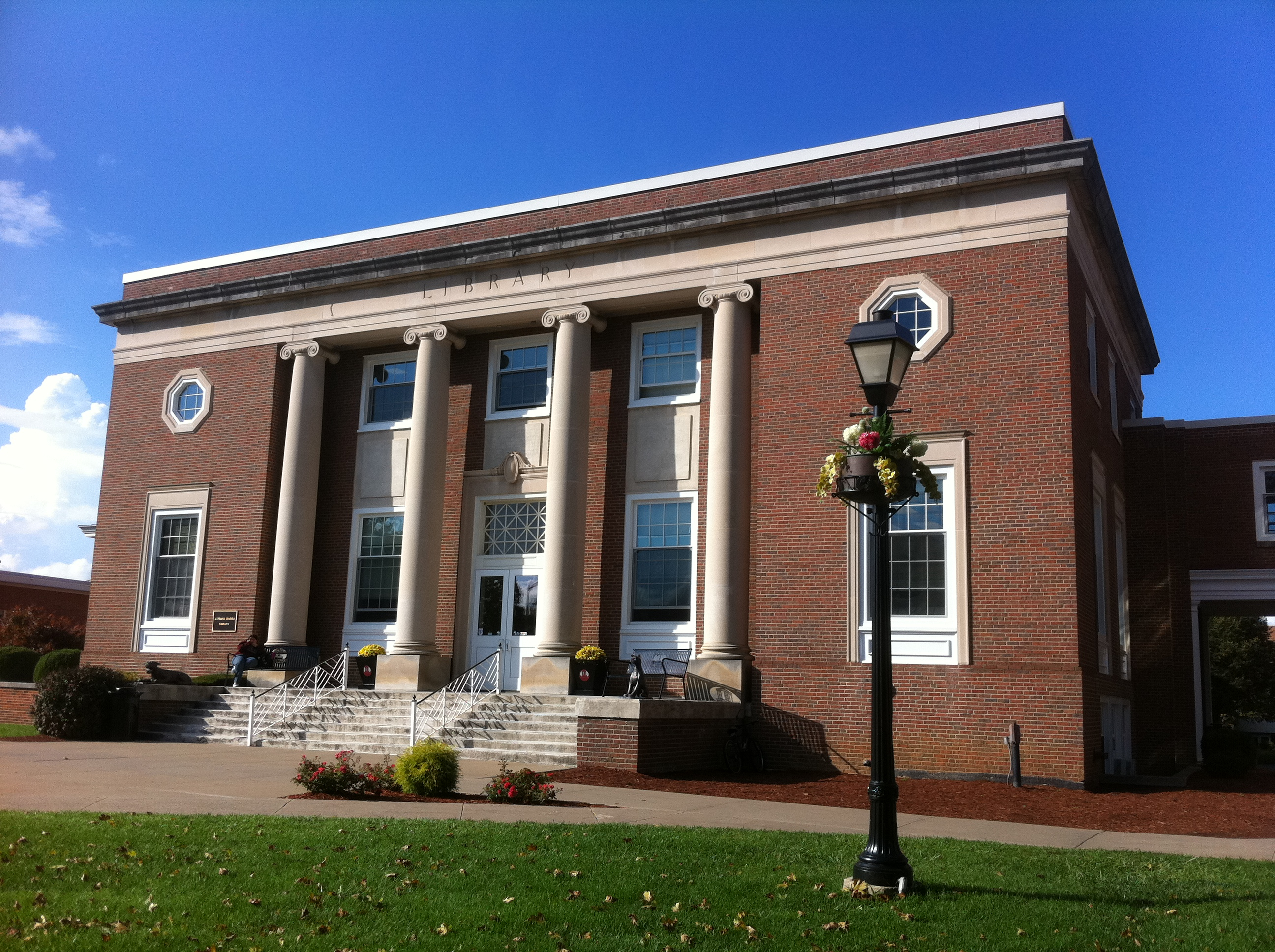
Marsh Library, Concord College, 1941.

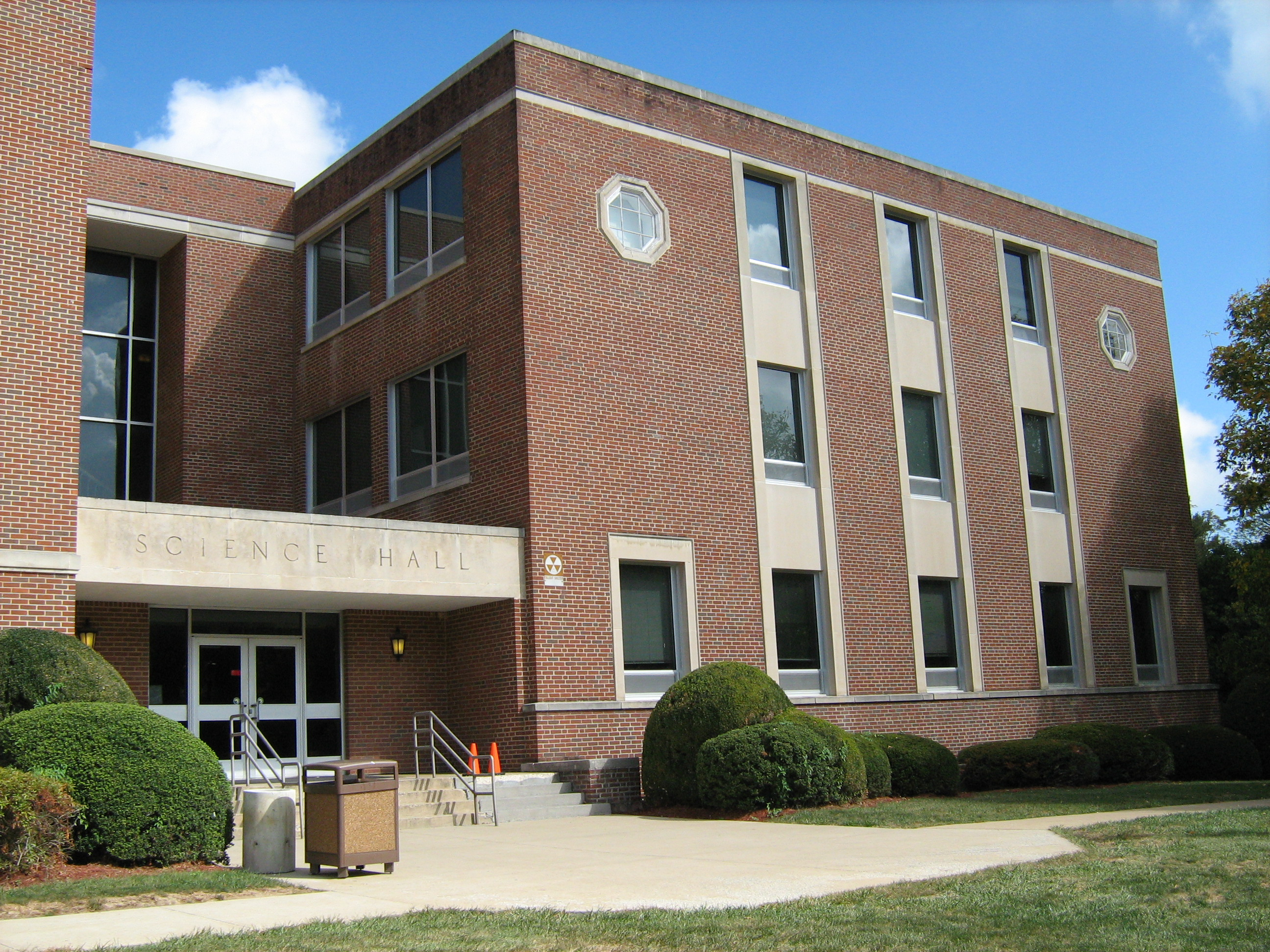
Science Hall, Concord College, 1951.

Garry & Sheffey was a prominent architectural firm from Bluefield, the largest city in southern West Virginia. The named partners were Martin J. Garry and Robert A. Sheffey, who established their partnership in 1920. The firm was active until 1941, and locally was second only to that of Alex. B. Mahood.

== History and legacy ==
The firm was founded sometime in the early 20th century as Pedigo & Garry, by Garry and Mack Henry Pedigo, a contractor. Pedigo & Garry was only the third architectural firm to be established in Bluefield, after the father-and-son office of W. E. & E. L. Shufflebarger and that of T. T. Carter. The partnership was dissolved in 1920, and Garry was briefly on his own before promoting Sheffey. Garry retired in 1941, and the firm became Robert A. Sheffey, Architect.

Garry & Sheffey and Pedigo & Garry are associated with the design of at least three properties individually placed on the National Register of Historic Places, and their works contribute to at least four more listed historic districts.

== List of works ==
=== Pedigo & Garry, to 1920 ===
- 1909 - Joseph M. Sanders House, 117 Oakhurst Ave, Bluefield, West Virginia
- 1912 - Huff, Andrews & Thomas Warehouse, Princeton Ave, Bluefield, West Virginia
  - Demolished.
- 1915 - Masonic Building (Former), 109 Wyoming St, Welch, West Virginia
- 1915 - Scott Street Baptist Church, 600 Scott St, Bluefield, West Virginia
- 1917 - McNary & Johnson Building, 119 Wyoming St, Welch, West Virginia
- 1919 - Beulah A. M. E. Church (Former), 901 Bland St, Bluefield, West Virginia
- 1919 - First National Bank Building, Center St, Iaeger, West Virginia

=== Garry & Sheffey, 1920-1941 ===
- 1921 - Westminster Presbyterian Church, 2005 Washington St, Bluefield, West Virginia
- 1922 - Hotel Carter (Tyson Towers), 80 McDowell St, Welch, West Virginia
- 1923 - Bailey Building, 704 Bland St, Bluefield, West Virginia
- 1924 - Bluefield Municipal Building (Former), 514 Bland St, Bluefield, West Virginia
  - With Wilbur T. Mills of Columbus, Ohio.
- 1925 - Mingo County Memorial Building, Logan St, Williamson, West Virginia
- 1926 - Ramsey School, 300 Ramsey St, Bluefield, West Virginia
- 1927 - Elks Building, 405 Raleigh St, Bluefield, West Virginia
- 1928 - E. W. Horton House, 615 Oakhurst Ave, Bluefield, West Virginia
- 1928 - Mercer County Memorial Building, 1500 W Main St, Princeton, West Virginia
- 1929 - Bland County Courthouse (Remodeling), 612 Main St, Bland, Virginia
  - Most visibly, Garry & Sheffey added the building's portico.
- 1930 - Gordon C. Felts House, 404 N Main St, Galax, Virginia
- 1930 - President's House, Bluefield State College, Bluefield, West Virginia
- 1931 - Big Creek High School, Center St, War, West Virginia
  - Burned in 2015.
- 1931 - U. S. Post Office, 921 Mercer St, Princeton, West Virginia
  - This building is now the Princeton Public Library.
- 1934 - Bramwell High School (Former), Bluestone Ave, Bramwell, West Virginia
- 1935- Sidney J. Kwass House, 730 Parkway Ave, Bluefield, West Virginia
  - A rare local example of Art Deco design.
- 1936 - Concord Masonic Lodge, Main St, Athens, West Virginia
- 1941 - Marsh Library, Concord State Teachers College, Athens, West Virginia

=== Robert A. Sheffey, from 1941 ===
- 1949 - Collins High (Middle) School, 601 Jones Ave, Oak Hill, West Virginia
- 1951 - Science Hall, Concord College, Athens, West Virginia
