= Moxley =

Moxley may refer to:

- Moxley, Georgia, United States
- Moxley, West Midlands, England
- Mount Moxley, a peak in the Royal Society Range, Antarctica

== People with the surname ==
- Dorthy Moxley (1932–2024), American educator and crime victim advocate
- Jennifer Moxley (born 1964), American poet
- Jon Moxley (born 1985), American professional wrestler
- Joseph C. Moxley (1884–1976), American politician and physician from Virginia
- Martha Moxley (1960–1975), American murder victim
- Thomas L. Moxley (1828–1890), American actor
- Tom Moxley (born 1946), American politician
- William Moxley (1851–1938), American politician
