= Jerry H. Geisler =

American politician and lawyer

Jerry Geisler
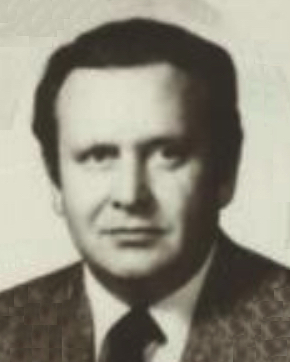
- Official portrait, 1978

Minority Leader of the Virginia House of Delegates
- In office September 11, 1974 – January 13, 1982
- Preceded by: Pete Giesen
- Succeeded by: Vince Callahan

Member of the Virginia House of Delegates
- In office January 12, 1966 – January 13, 1982 Serving with: John N. Dalton (1972–1973); Ward Teel (1973–1982)
- Preceded by: Virgil J. Cox
- Succeeded by: Joan H. Munford
- Constituency: 32nd district (1972–1982); 6th district (1972–1982)

Personal details
- Born: Jerry Hubert Geisler; July 6, 1934 Big Stone Gap, Virginia, U.S.
- Died: May 6, 2012 (aged 77) Roanoke, Virginia, U.S.
- Party: Democratic (until 1967); Republican (1967–2012)
- Spouse: Betty Coyle
- Education: Emory & Henry College (BA); University of Richmond (LLB)

Jerry Hubert Geisler (July 6, 1934 – May 6, 2012) was an American lawyer and Republican politician. He was first elected in 1965 to represent Carroll, Grayson, Galax City in the Virginia House of Delegates, defeating Hillsville mayor Raleigh Cooley. In 1967, Geisler switched parties to the Republican Party, a move made by many in the southern United States due to the national Democratic Party's new focus on civil rights. In 1974, he was selected by the members of his caucus to be minority leader, a position in which he served until he was defeated for election in the reorganized 5th district in 1981.
