= Carsonville =

Carsonville may refer to a location in the United States:

- Carsonville, Georgia, an unincorporated community in northern Taylor County, Georgia
- Carsonville, Michigan
- Carsonville Township, Minnesota
- Carsonville, Missouri, an unincorporated place in St. Louis County, Missouri
- Carsonville, Pennsylvania, an unincorporated community in Jefferson Township, Dauphin County, Pennsylvania
- Carsonville, Virginia, an unincorporated community in Grayson County, Virginia
