= Jack Kenny Williams =

American teacher, military officer and college president (1920–1981)

Chancellor of the Texas A&M University System
- In office May 24, 1977 – January 24, 1979

17th President of Texas A&M University
- In office November 1, 1970 – July 31, 1977
- Preceded by: James Earl Rudder
- Succeeded by: Jarvis E. Miller

Personal details
- Born: April 5, 1920 Galax, Virginia, U.S.
- Died: September 28, 1981 (aged 61) Houston, Texas, U.S.
- Resting place: Woodland Cemetery, Clemson, South Carolina, U.S.
- Education: Galax High School; Emory and Henry College
- Profession: Educator

Military service
- Allegiance: United States
- Branch/service: United States Marine Corps
- Rank: Major
- Battles/wars: World War II

Jack Kenny Williams, Ph.D., (April 5, 1920 – September 28, 1981) was a teacher who became an administrator then eventually president and chancellor of one of the largest university systems in the United States, before returning to the role of teacher.

== Early years ==
Jack K. Williams was born April 5, 1920, in Galax, Virginia, where he grew up. He graduated from Galax High School in 1936. He then attended Emory and Henry College, Emory, Virginia, graduating in 1940. He began his professional career as a high school teacher and secondary principal in Carroll County, Virginia.

== Higher education ==
Williams' higher education career began with two years as a graduate teaching fellow at Emory University in Atlanta, Georgia. During this time he earned his Masters and Ph.D. degrees. Next came 17 years of teaching and leadership in administration at Clemson University, Clemson, South Carolina. He joined the Clemson faculty following World War II as an instructor. He taught history and government and worked his way up to become graduate dean. In 1960, he was named Clemson's dean of faculty and vice president for academic affairs.

== Military service ==
During World War II, Williams served as an officer with the Fourth Division of the U.S. Marine Corps. He served his country with distinction in the Pacific. He retired from the Marine Corps with a rank of Major.

== Texas A&M years ==
On September 11, 1970, Williams was elected as the 17th president of Texas A&M University. On May 24, 1977, he was elevated to the position of Chancellor of the entire Texas A&M System. The Texas A&M System is one of the largest university systems in the United States.

He resigned as the Texas A&M chancellor on January 24, 1979, to return to teaching. It was teaching that he loved most. During his career he authored numerous books and related works, several of these are listed in the external links below.

Williams died September 28, 1981, in Houston, Texas, and was buried on the Clemson University campus in the Woodland Cemetery. His headstone reads simply “Jack Kenny Williams -- teacher”
