= Stevens Creek, Virginia =

- Census-designated place
- Location within Virginia Location within the United States
- Coordinates: 36°43′43″N 80°59′54″W
- Country: United States
- State: Virginia
- County: Grayson

Area
  - Total: 0.68 sq mi (1.76 km^{2})
  - Land: 0.68 sq mi (1.76 km^{2})
  - Water: 0 sq mi (0.0 km^{2})
- Elevation: 2,435 ft (742 m)

Population (2020)
  - Total: 240
- Time zone: UTC-5 (Eastern (EST))
  - Summer (DST): UTC-4 (EDT)
- ZIP Code: 24330 (Fries)
- Area code: 276
- FIPS code: 51-75440
- GNIS feature ID: 2807424

Stevens Creek is an unincorporated community and census-designated place (CDP) in Grayson County, Virginia, United States. As of the 2020 census, it had a population of 240.

The CDP is in eastern Grayson County, bordered to the southeast by Hilltown and to the northeast by Carroll County. It is less than 2 miles (3 km) northwest of Fries and 10 miles (16 km) northwest of Galax. The stream named Stevens Creek passes 0.8 miles (1.3 km) southwest of the community, flowing southeast to the New River upstream from Fries.

== Demographics ==
Stevens Creek first appeared as a census designated place in the 2020 U.S. census.
