= Joseph C. Moxley =

American politician and physician (1884–1976)

Member of the Virginia House of Delegates
- In office 1952–1961
- Succeeded by: Virgil J. Cox

Personal details
- Born: November 17, 1884 Alleghany County, North Carolina, U.S.
- Died: February 6, 1976 (aged 91) Marion, Virginia, U.S.
- Resting place: Hale Cemetery; Elk Creek, Virginia, U.S.
- Party: Republican
- Spouse: Emma Rose Kirby
- Children: 1
- Education: North Carolina Medical College
- Occupation: Politician; physician; farmer

Joseph C. Moxley (November 17, 1884 – February 6, 1976) was an American politician and physician from Virginia. He served as a member of the Virginia House of Delegates from 1952 to 1961.

== Early life ==
Joseph C. Moxley was born on November 17, 1884, in Alleghany County, North Carolina, to Sara (née Tolliver) and Alfred Moxley. He attended North Carolina Medical College.

== Career ==
Moxley worked as a doctor in Grayson County for 63 years. He also served as medical examiner of Grayson County. He was director of Grayson National Bank in Independence. He was also a dairy and cattle farmer.

Moxley was a Republican. He represented Grayson County in the Virginia House of Delegates from 1952 to 1961. He served as a member of the town council of Independence. He was defeated for re-election in 1961 by Virgil J. Cox.

== Personal life ==
Moxley married Emma Rose Kirby, daughter of Nancy (née McKnight) and James Heath Kirby, of Grayson County. They had a daughter, Nancy. He was a member and leader of the Lebanon United Methodist Church.

Moxley died on February 6, 1976, at the Smyth County Community Hospital in Marion. He was buried at Hale Cemetery in Elk Creek.
