= Hilltown, Virginia =

- Census-designated place
- Location within Virginia Location within the United States
- Coordinates: 36.7293°N 80.9822°W
- Country: United States
- State: Virginia
- Counties: Grayson; Carroll

Area
  - Total: 0.56 sq mi (1.44 km^{2})
  - Land: 0.56 sq mi (1.44 km^{2})
  - Water: 0 sq mi (0.0 km^{2})

Population (2020)
  - Total: 216
- Time zone: UTC-5 (Eastern (EST))
  - Summer (DST): UTC-4 (EDT)
- ZIP Code: 24330 (Fries)
- Area code: 276
- FIPS code: 51-37380
- GNIS feature ID: 2807423

Hilltown is an unincorporated community and census-designated place (CDP) in Grayson and Carroll counties, Virginia, United States. As of the 2020 census, it had a population of 216.

The CDP straddles eastern Grayson and western Carroll counties, along Virginia State Route 94. It is bordered to the west by Stevens Creek and to the south by Fries. Hilltown is 9 miles (14 km) northwest of Galax and 25 miles (40 km) south of Wytheville. The New River passes within one mile of Hilltown to the south and east.

== Demographics ==
Hilltown first appeared as a census designated place in the 2020 U.S. census.
