= Virgil J. Cox =

American politician and physician (1904–1991)

Member of the Virginia House of Delegates
- In office 1962–1965
- Preceded by: Joseph C. Moxley
- Succeeded by: Jerry H. Geisler

Personal details
- Born: Virgil Jefferson Cox; November 5, 1904 Grayson County, Virginia, U.S.
- Died: August 2, 1991 (aged 86) Galax, Virginia, U.S.
- Resting place: Felts Cemetery
- Party: Democratic
- Spouse: Gladys Guynn
- Education: Emory and Henry College (BA); Medical College of Virginia (MD)
- Occupation: Politician; physician

Virgil Jefferson Cox (November 5, 1904 – August 2, 1991) was an American politician and physician from Virginia. He was a member of the Virginia House of Delegates from 1962 to 1965.

== Early life ==
Virgil Jefferson Cox was born on November 5, 1904, in Grayson County, Virginia, to Lucy (née McKnight) and Jefferson Davis Cox. He grew up on a farm in Grayson County. He worked multiple jobs during college and graduated from Emory and Henry College with a Bachelor of Arts in 1929. Cox taught at Baywood High School for two years and worked in sales during the summer. He then graduated from the Medical College of Virginia with a Doctor of Medicine in 1934. He did his intern work at Wilmington General Hospital. He also studied at Poly-Clinic Hospital in New York and the New York Eye and Ear Infirmary.

== Career ==
In 1936, Cox opened his medical office in Galax. In 1952, he co-founded the non-profit Blue Ridge Hospital and Clinic. The hospital expanded and became Galax General Hospital. It was later replaced by Twin County Community Hospital. He served as the hospital's president and was a member of its board of directors.

Cox was a Democrat. He represented Galax and Grayson County in the Virginia House of Delegates from 1962 to 1965. He helped support legislation that established Grayson Highlands State Park.

== Personal life ==
Cox married Gladys Guynn. He owned the Dr. Virgil Cox House on West Stuart Drive in Galax. He supported the Galax United Methodist Church.

Cox died on August 2, 1991, at Twin County Community Hospital. He was buried in Felts Cemetery.

== Legacy ==
In 1983, Cox donated US$25,000 to Emory and Henry College to establish a scholarship for pre-medical students.
