= Old Grayson County Courthouse and Clerk's Office =

Historic courthouse in Virginia, US

- U.S. National Register of Historic Places
- Virginia Landmarks Register
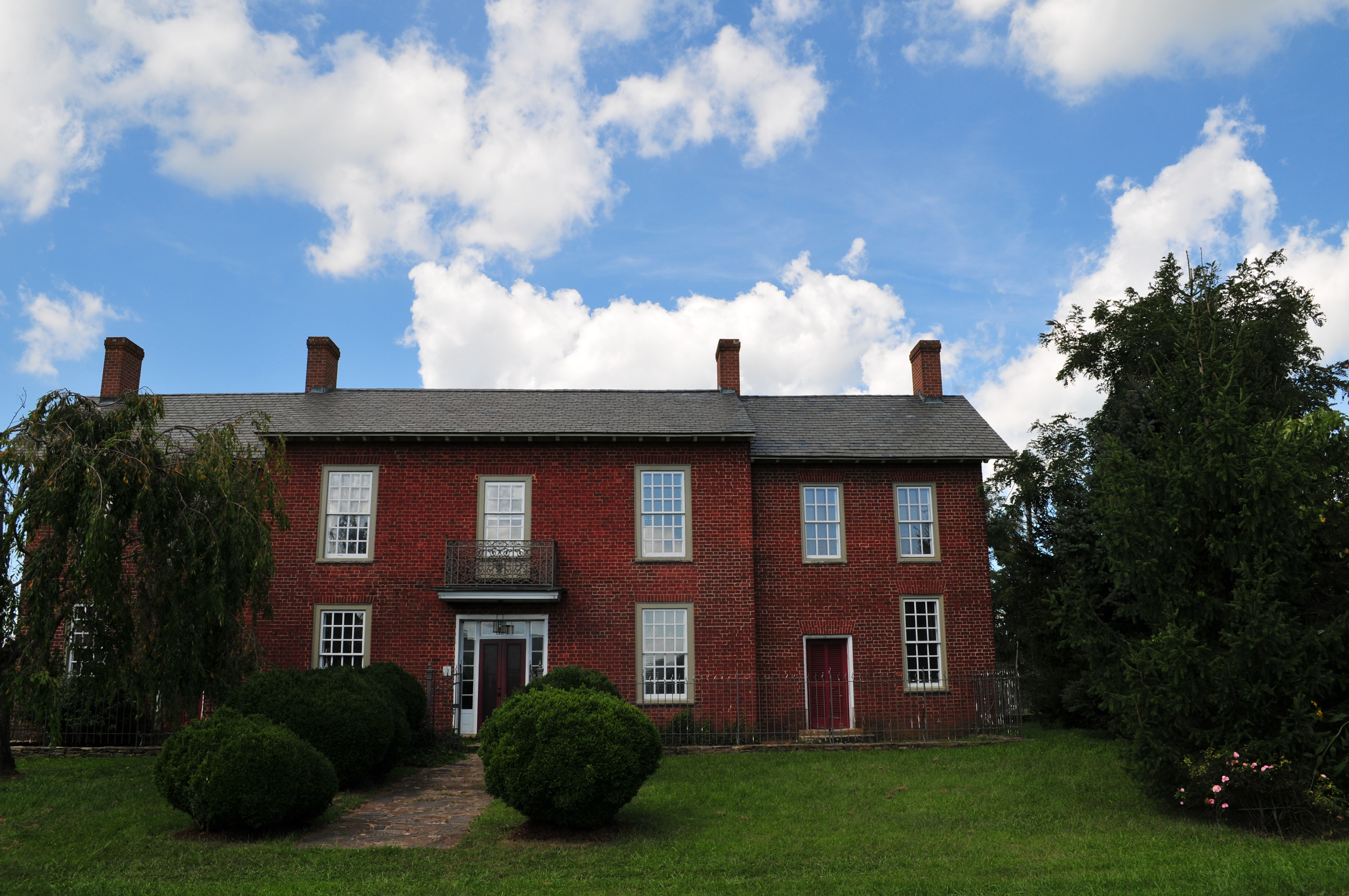
- Old Grayson County Courthouse

- Location within Virginia Location within the United States
- Location: Junction of Greenville and Justice Rds., Galax, Virginia
- Coordinates: 36°39′17″N 80°57′38″W
- Area: less than one acre
- Built: 1810, 1834
- Built by: Toncray, James; Dickenson, Martin
- Architectural style: Federal
- NRHP reference No.: 97000151
- VLR No.: 038-0004, 038-0005

Significant dates
- Added to NRHP: February 21, 1997
- Designated VLR: September 18, 1996

The Old Grayson County Courthouse and Clerk's Office is a historic county courthouse located at Galax, Grayson County, Virginia. The Old Grayson County Courthouse was built in 1834, and consists of a two-story central block with flanking two-story wings and a one-story addition on the rear north side which was built in the 1870s and expanded in 1988. The Old clerk's Office, built in 1810, is a simple one-room brick structure. In 1850 the county seat moved to its present location in Independence, and the courthouse was subsequently used as a private residence, as a hotel, an apartment house, and a hay barn.

It was listed on the National Register of Historic Places in 1997.
