= Rugby, Virginia =

Unincorporated community in Virginia, United States

Rugby
- Unincorporated community
- Location within the Commonwealth of Virginia Rugby (the United States)
- Country: United States
- State: Virginia
- County: Grayson
- Time zone: UTC-5 (Eastern (EST))
  - Summer (DST): UTC-4 (EDT)
- GNIS feature ID: 1496179

Rugby is an unincorporated community in Grayson County, Virginia, United States.
