= Baywood, Virginia =

Unincorporated community in Virginia, United States

Coordinates: 36°36′37″N 81°00′43″W

- Census-designated place
- Location within Virginia Location within the United States
- Country: United States
- State: Virginia
- County: Grayson

Population (2020)
  - Total: 414
- Time zone: UTC−5 (Eastern (EST))
  - Summer (DST): UTC−4 (EDT)

Baywood is an unincorporated community and census-designated place (CDP) in Grayson County, in the southwestern part of the U.S. state of Virginia. It was first listed as a CDP in the 2020 census with a population of 414.

== History ==
Baywood was established as a hub community, roughly embracing the area from Meadow Creek, Edmonds, NC, Little River and New River. The area was settled in the late 18th century by several families with land grants from the revolutionary war. The nearest town was Fries, VA until Galax, VA was established in 1905. Baywood was known as Hampton Crossroads until a post office was established there in 1903. Mail was often mixed up with mail meant for Hampton's Roads, and as a result, Hampton Crossroads became known as Baywood. Arch Moore, postmaster, named the community Baywood after a tree growing in the area called the Bay Tree. After 1937, the Baywood post office was closed and mail services transferred to the Galax post office. The first 'board and telephone system' was installed for the community in 1909. This service was transferred to Inter-Mountain Telephone in 1957. The first school built in the community was a wooden structure with four classrooms on the first floor and an auditorium on the second floor. This school opened in the fall of 1913. This school was replaced by the current school in 1953.

== Culture ==
The singers of the Cross Roads Primitive Baptist Church are featured on the 1978 LP Children of the Heav'nly King: Religious Expression in the Central Blue Ridge (recordings from the Blue Ridge Parkway Folklife Project conducted by the American Folklife Center in cooperation with the National Park Service, ed. Charles K. Wolfe), singing the hymn "Children of the Heav'nly King."

The old-time banjo player Haywood Blevins was recorded at Baywood by Peter Hoover on August 25, 1961, and the banjo player James Spencer Caudill was recorded at his home in Baywood by Blanton Owen on March 21, 1974; both of these recordings are housed at the Library of Congress's Archive of Folk Culture.

== Demographics ==
Baywood first appeared as a census designated place in the 2020 U.S. census.
