= Dave Baker (Kansas politician) =

American politician

Member of the Kansas House of Representatives from the 68th district
- In office January 9, 2017 – January 9, 2023
- Preceded by: Tom Moxley
- Succeeded by: Nathan Butler

Personal details
- Born: October 8, 1955 (age 70)
- Party: Republican

Dave Baker (born October 8, 1955) is an American politician who served as a member of the Kansas House of Representatives from the 68th district. Elected in November 2016, he assumed office on January 9, 2017, retiring after the 2022 elections. Outside of politics, Baker has worked as a real estate agent.
