= Municipal Building (Bluefield, West Virginia) =

- U.S. National Register of Historic Places
- U.S. Historic district – Contributing property
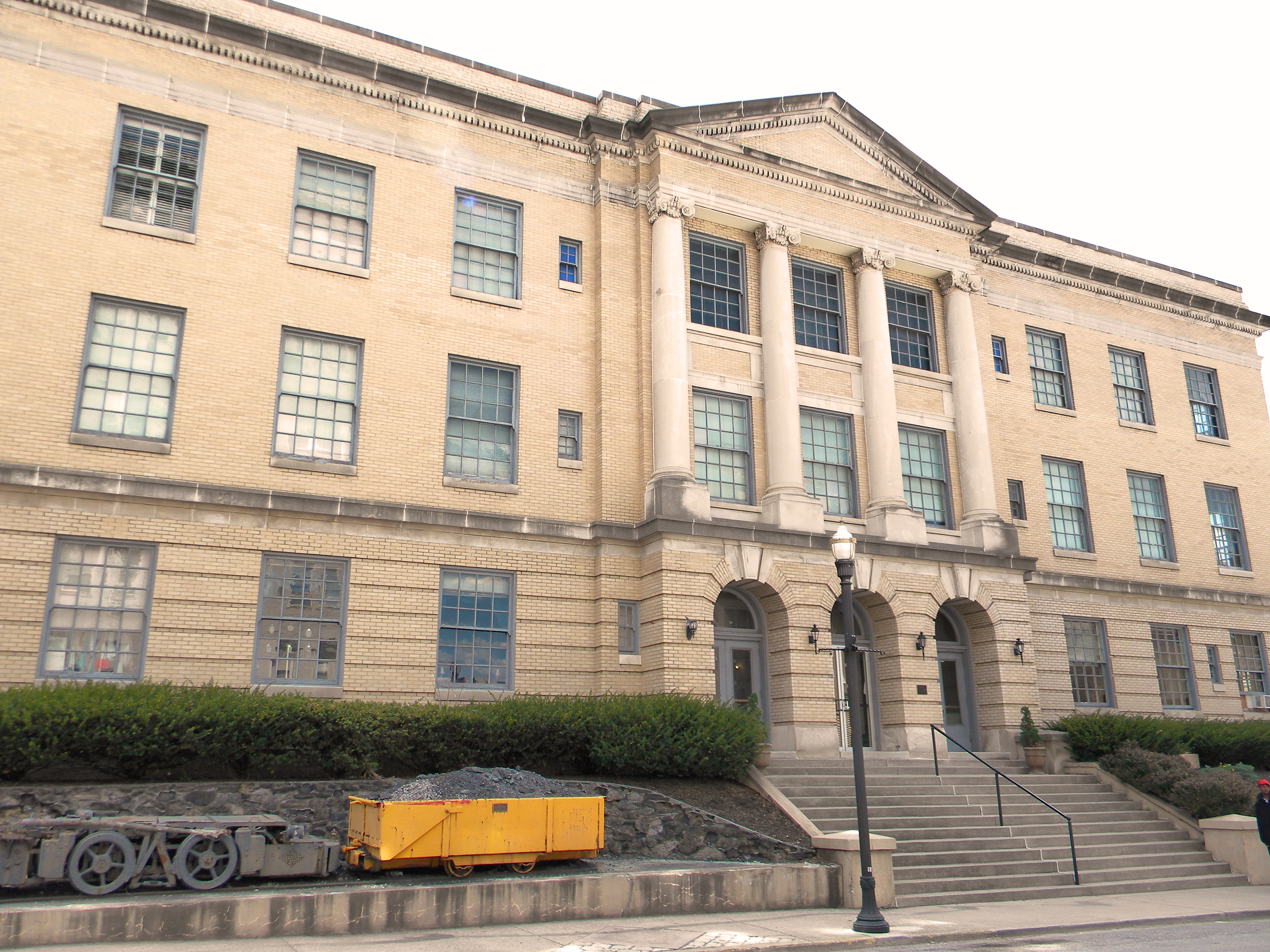

- Location within West Virginia Location within the United States
- Location: 514 Bland St., Bluefield, West Virginia
- Coordinates: 37°16′4″N 81°13′22″W
- Area: 0.5 acres (0.20 ha)
- Built: 1924
- Architect: Wilbur T. Mills; Garry & Sheffey
- Architectural style: Classical Revival
- NRHP reference No.: 79002591
- Added to NRHP: May 29, 1979

Municipal Building, also known as Old Bluefield Municipal Building, is a historic municipal building located in Bluefield, West Virginia, United States. It was built in 1924, and is a two- to three-story, steel and reinforced concrete Classical Revival-style building. It features a three-story high pedimented central pavilion with four engaged Ionic order columns. In 1977, the city government of Bluefield moved to its new building.

It was listed on the National Register of Historic Places in 1979. It is located in the Bluefield Downtown Commercial Historic District, established in 1987.
