= Wayne Henderson (luthier) =

American guitar maker

Henderson in his shop in 2007

Wayne C. Henderson is an American guitar maker who specializes in the crafting of handmade, custom acoustic guitars. He also occasionally makes other stringed instruments, such as mandolins, banjos, and fiddles.

== Biography ==
Henderson was born May 3, 1947, in Grayson County, Virginia, where he still resides today. He is a full-time instrument builder and musician, specializing in building guitars, mandolins, and plays with a unique finger-picking style. Though he has lived in Grayson County, Virginia, all of his life, Henderson has played countless performances in the southeast and in many foreign countries as well. He has been a member of several bands, and influenced many regional musicians, through both his music and craft. He developed a unique style of using a thumbpick and fingerpicks, like his father played on banjo, making his playing sound like flatpicking similar to that of Doc Watson, one of Henderson's musical influences.

Henderson's guitars are inspired by the great pre-World War II guitars of C.F. Martin & Company, and are hand-built in limited quantities; by October 2012, over five hundred Henderson guitars had been constructed. As of the year 2022, Henderson has built nearly nine hundred acoustic guitars, over one hundred mandolins, and has also built several banjos to add to his name. Henderson was originally exposed to the art of luthiery by a local of Grayson County, Albert Hash. Hash was a violin builder and repairer who gave inspiration to Henderson and helped him learn about different types of wood and how to work with wood.

== Career ==
Henderson has been an acoustic instrument maker and repairer for nearly 50 years. However, this has not been his main source of income through the years. He briefly worked as a part time repairman at Gruhn Guitars in Nashville, Tennessee. Henderson also worked for thirty some odd years as a rural mail carrier, delivering mail all throughout southwest Virginia. During his time as a mail carrier, he would build instruments in the time that he was not delivering mail. In that time he would build five to ten instruments per year. Now that he is retired, he builds somewhere between twenty and thirty instruments per year. Henderson has built quite the waiting list for one of his instruments. People often have to wait up to a decade until the completion of an instrument. He usually sells his guitars in the $3000 to $5000 range, and on the open market they can go for $20,000 to $30,000, which is one of the reasons why he has acquired such a waiting list.

Henderson has built guitars for many notable musicians such as Tommy Emmanuel, Doc Watson, Peter Rowan, Gillian Welch, Ricky Skaggs, Vince Gill, Eric Clapton, and many others.

The book Clapton's Guitar: Watching Wayne Henderson Build the Perfect Instrument (2005) outlined the process by which Henderson built a guitar for Eric Clapton. In 2008 he was the subject of an Appalshop documentary, From Wood to Singing Guitar.

As well as being a world renowned instrument maker, he has also become well known for his guitar playing ability. Henderson is also a fingerstyle guitar player, and was influenced by his older cousin Estil C. Ball. He was featured as part of the "Masters of the Steel String Guitar" tour and has traveled internationally with the United States Information Agency. He also performed at Carnegie Hall and the Smithsonian Institution and for "America's Reunion" during the 1992 presidential inauguration.

== Awards and honors ==
He has won over 300 ribbons playing in competitions at fiddlers conventions.

In a 1995 White House ceremony, he was awarded a National Heritage Fellowship in recognition of his extraordinary instrument-making.
