= Galax High School =

Location
- 200 Maroon Tide Drive; Galax, Virginia 24333; United States

Information
- Type: Public, High School
- Motto: "Be here, be involved, be successful"
- School district: Galax City Public Schools
- Superintendent: Susan Tilley
- Principal: Charles Byrd
- Grades: 9–12
- Enrollment: 493 (2016–17)
- Color: Maroon White
- Athletics: Baseball, Basketball, Cross-Country, Football, Golf, Soccer, Softball, Swimming, Tennis, Track, Volleyball, Wrestling
- Athletics conference: VHSL Class 1 VHSL Region C VHSL Mountain Empire District
- Mascot: Maroon Tide
- Website: ghs.galaxschools.us/o/ghs

Galax High School is a high school located in the independent city of Galax, Virginia, United States.

== History ==
There has been substantial growth within the Galax City Public School System since the original promoters of the town allocated ten acres of pine grove for public school purposes. The first public school offered a two-year high school program and had six graduates in 1909. In 1912 it became a four-year high school with five graduates. A new and separate high school building was begun in 1953. Improvements continued at intervals with a cafeteria, auditorium, and gymnasium being added in the late 1960s and early 1970s. The most recent renovation, completed in Spring of 2009, included new windows and doors, a new heating and cooling system, and an upgrade in the electrical systems.

== Athletics ==
=== Football ===
The Galax football team captured Group A Division 1 state championships in 2015. Galax defeated Riverheads High School by a score of 7–6 by stopping a two-point conversion on the last play of the game. It was Riverheads High School's first loss of the year.

=== Basketball ===
The Galax boys' basketball team captured Group A Division 1 state championships in 2011 and 2012. The Maroon Tide won their first state championship in school history in 2011, defeating Page County High School by a score of 49–47. Galax head coach Verl Brown was named the 2011 Division 1 coach of the year by the Virginia High School Coaches Association. In 2012, Galax repeated as state champions, knocking off Amelia County 66–49. Lawrence Parsons was named the 2012 Group A Division 1 boys basketball player of the year by the Virginia High School Coaches Association. The association also named Galax's Verl Brown the 2012 Group A Division 1 coach of the year for the second consecutive season.

=== Golf ===
In total, the Maroon Tide have brought home six state championships – second only to Stonewall Jackson's nine. Galax won the VHSL Group AA state championship in 1973, besting Altavista 609–619. Fifteen years later, they claimed the 1988 Group A state championship, defeating Brentsville 668–706. They won by one of the largest margins on record. In 2004, Galax downed James River-Buchanan 629–636 to capture their third championship. The Maroon Tide defeated Giles 646-658 in 2008 for their fourth state championship. Galax won back-to-back titles in 2010 and 2011, besting Giles 636-638 and Union 598-616. Sam Bryant was individual medalist at the 2005 state tournament, winning by 6 shots after firing a 142 at Shenandoah Valley Golf Club in Front Royal. John Bryant won the individual championship at the rain shortened 2012 VHSL state tournament held at Lonesome Pine Country Club in Big Stone Gap after firing a 3 under par 104 to give him a 7-shot victory.

=== Tennis ===
Galax won the VHSL Group A state championship in boys tennis in 2000, defeating George Mason by a score of 5–4. In 2008, the duo of Matt Nelson and James "G" Zachary teamed up for the state title as a doubles team, downing Tim Goetz and Johnny Vroom of George Mason 6–3, 0–6, 6–3.

=== Wrestling ===
Galax has produced five individual state champions in wrestling;

- Edu Rojas, 119 pound class, 2009
- Jose Rojas, 125 pound class, 2010
- Darian Sizemore, 145 pound class, 2010
- Junior Espinoza, 112 pound class, 2011
- Brender Rojas, 250 pound class, in 2019–2020

=== Baseball ===
Galax won the 2012 VHSL state baseball championship with a 9–8 victory over Holston High School.

== About the school division ==
The Galax City Public School Division is in Galax, Virginia. The city of Galax is on the boundary between Carroll and Grayson counties in southwest Virginia. Galax is nestled in the Blue Ridge Mountains about 82 miles (132 km) southwest of Roanoke, Virginia and 68 miles (109 km) northwest of Winston-Salem, North Carolina. The city is approximately 7 square miles (18 km^{2}) in area. Galax High School currently has around 350 students.

The Galax City Public School Board consists of five members who are appointed by City Council. The School Board meets the second Tuesday of each month, with special meetings scheduled as needed.
