= Elk Creek, Virginia =

Unincorporated community in Virginia, United States

Coordinates: 36°43′17″N 81°10′37″W

Elk Creek is an unincorporated community in Grayson County, Virginia, United States.

Elk Creek is home to a local dragstrip owned by the people who participate in the races held there.

The ZCTA for Elk Creek's ZIP Code is 24326 and had a population of 478 at the 2000 census..
