= A. G. Pless Jr. House =

Historic house in Virginia, United States

- U.S. National Register of Historic Places
- Virginia Landmarks Register
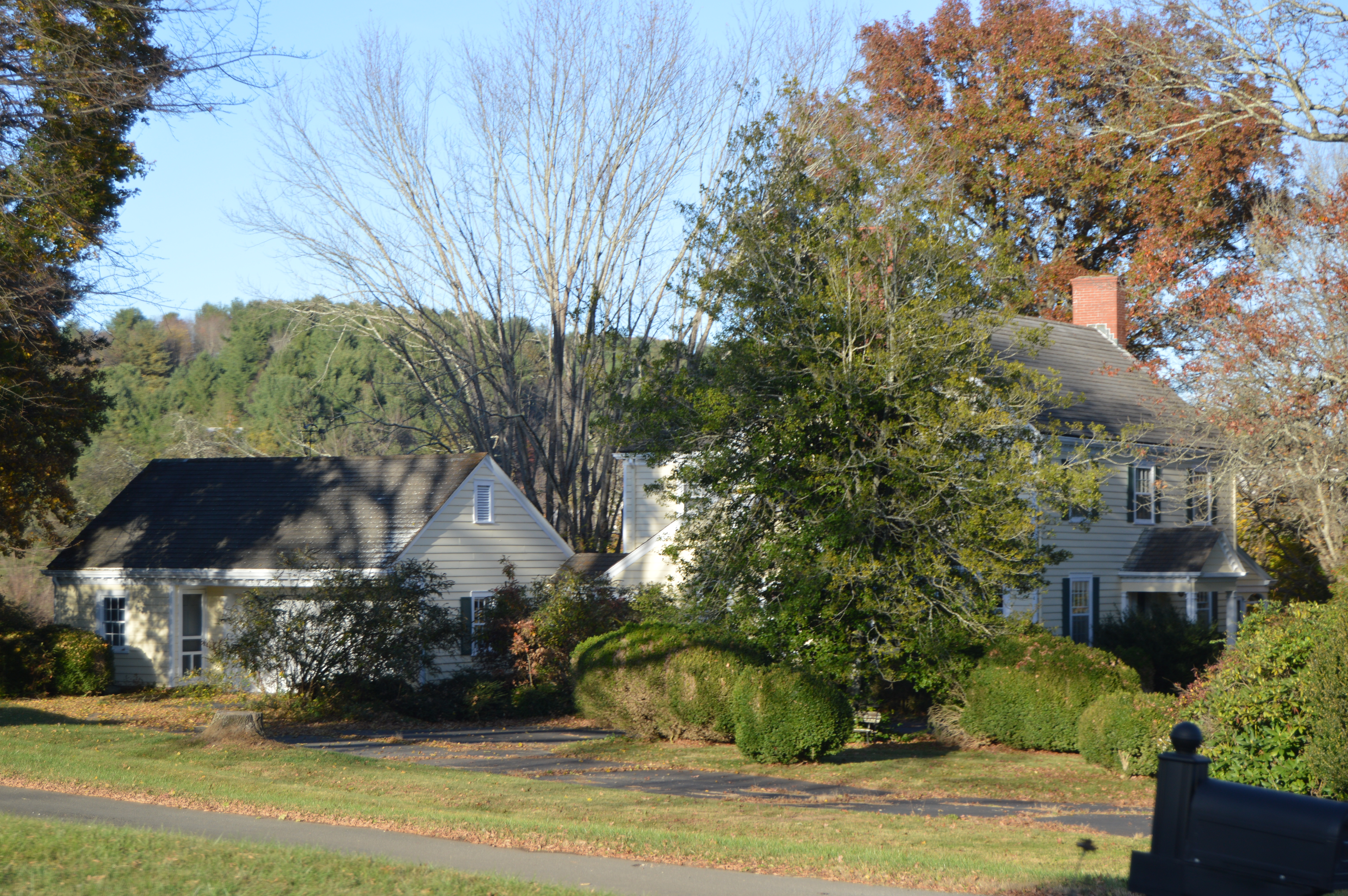
- Roadside view of the house

- Location within Virginia Location within the United States
- Location: 942 Glendale Rd., Galax, Virginia
- Coordinates: 36°40′59″N 80°54′5″W
- Area: Less than 1 acre (0.40 ha)
- Built: 1939
- Architect: William Roy Wallace
- Architectural style: Colonial Revival
- NRHP reference No.: 02000526
- VLR No.: 113-5032

Significant dates
- Added to NRHP: May 16, 2002
- Designated VLR: December 5, 2001

The A. G. Pless Jr. House is a historic home located at Galax, Virginia. It was completed in 1939, and consists of a three-story, side gabled main section with a three-story rear wing, one-story west wing, and one-story, shed roofed sun porch on the east. The house is in the Colonial Revival style. It features flanking brick end chimneys. Also on the property is a contributing garage. This architect for this home was William Roy Wallace.

It was listed on the National Register of Historic Places in 2002.
