= Bluefield Downtown Commercial Historic District =

Historic district in West Virginia, United States

- U.S. National Register of Historic Places
- U.S. Historic district
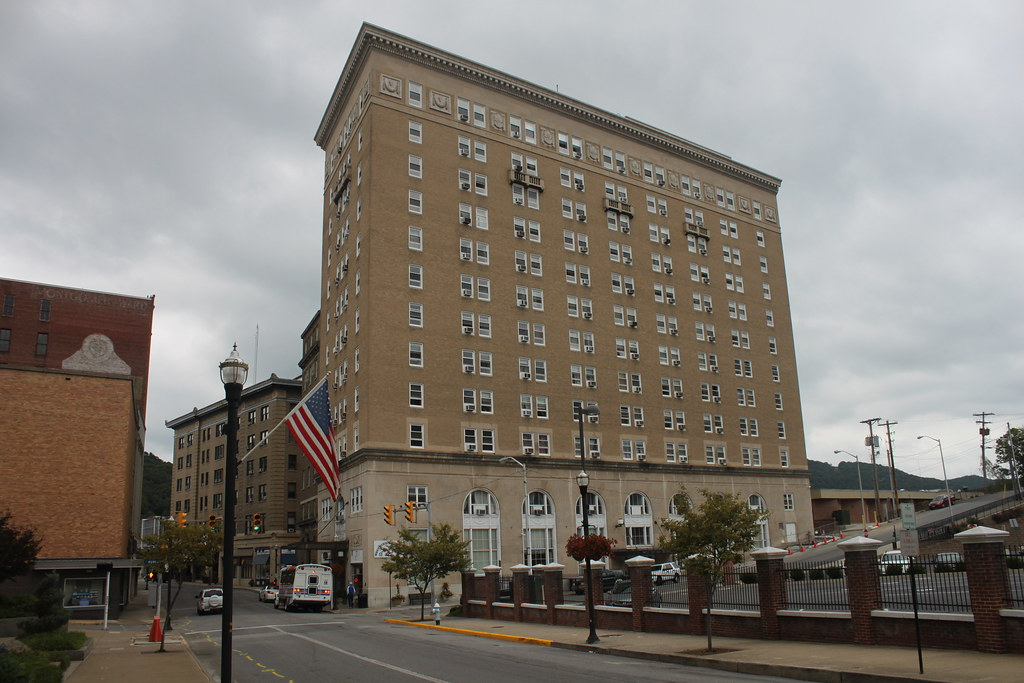
- West Virginia Hotel

- Location within West Virginia Location within the United States
- Location: Roughly bounded by Princeton Ave., Scott, High, and Russell Sts., Bluefield, West Virginia
- Coordinates: 37°16′4″N 81°13′18″W
- Area: 28 acres (11 ha)
- Built: 1889
- Architect: Alex B. Mahood, et al.
- Architectural style: Moderne, Renaissance, Art Deco
- NRHP reference No.: 87000630
- Added to NRHP: March 18, 1987

Bluefield Downtown Commercial Historic District is a national historic district located at Bluefield, Mercer County, West Virginia. The district includes 73 contributing buildings in Bluefield's central business district. The buildings are primarily three and four story masonry commercial buildings. Notable buildings include The Shamrock Restaurant (1885), People's Bank (1895), the Art Deco / Moderne style Colonial Theatre (1916, c. 1945) and Appalachian Power Company building (1923, 1939), Law and Commerce Building (1913, 1918), Benevolent Protective Order of Elks Building (1902, 1927), First Christian Church (1920), Elizabeth Kee Federal Building and Post Office (1911), Bluefield Sanatorium, and West Virginia Hotel (1923) designed by Alex B. Mahood. Located in the district is the separately listed Municipal Building. It was listed on the National Register of Historic Places in 1987.
