= Galax Commercial Historic District =

Historic district in Virginia, United States

- U.S. National Register of Historic Places
- U.S. Historic district
- Virginia Landmarks Register
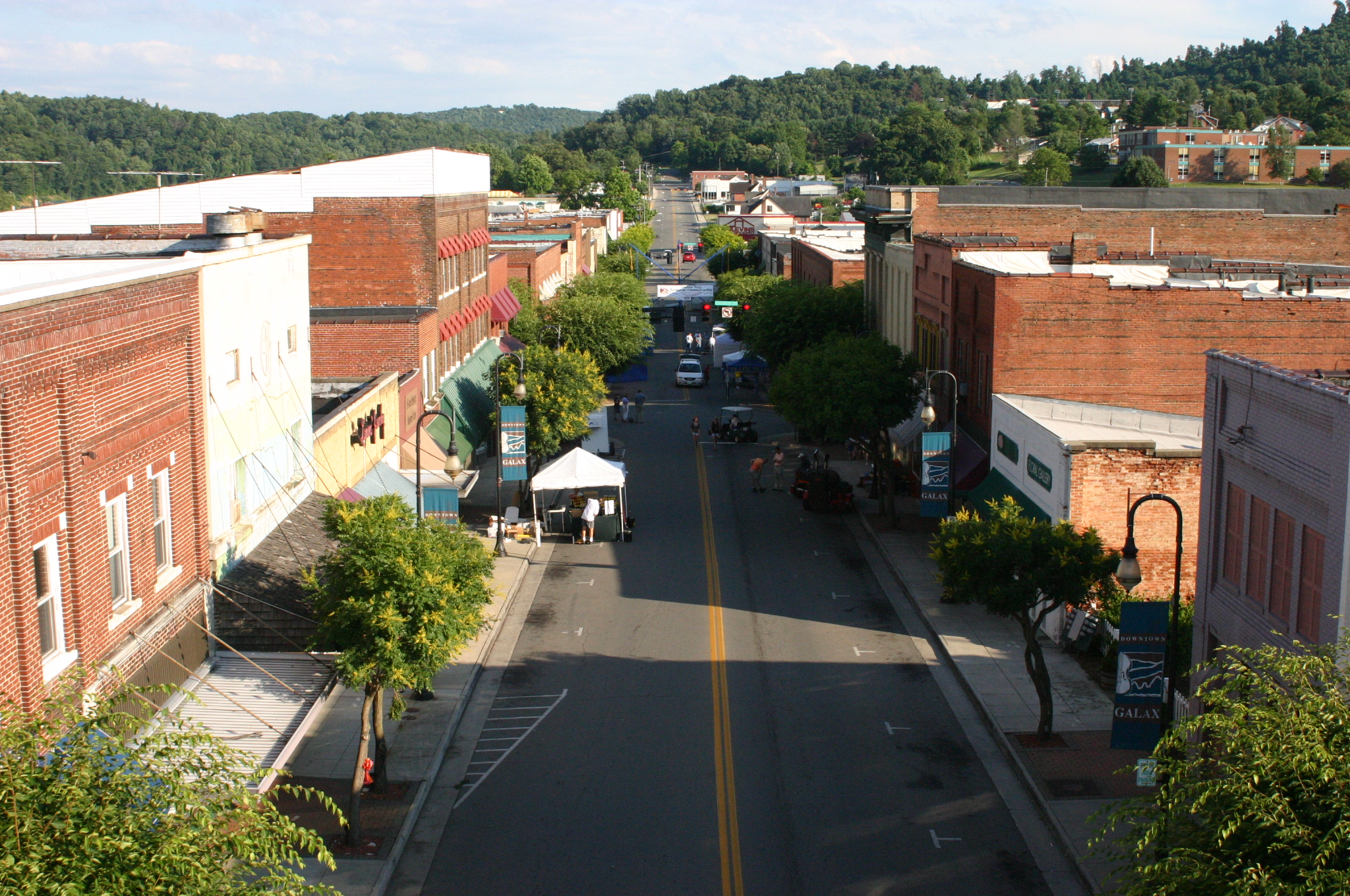
- Main Street, Galax, Virginia, July 2007

- Location within Virginia Location within the United States
- Location: Roughly Main, Center, Grayson, Carroll and Oldtown Sts.; also 107 W. Oldtown St., Galax, Virginia
- Coordinates: 36°39′53″N 80°55′13″W
- Area: 16 acres (6.5 ha)
- Built: 1908
- NRHP reference No.: 02000593, 08001053 (Boundary Increase)
- VLR No.: 113-5001

Significant dates
- Added to NRHP: May 30, 2002, November 12, 2008 (Boundary Increase)
- Designated VLR: June 13, 2001, February 7, 2008, September 18, 2008

Galax Commercial Historic District is a national historic district located at Galax, Virginia. The district encompasses 67 contributing buildings in the central business district of Galax. A few of the buildings are one-story storefronts, but a majority of the buildings are two-story commercial buildings with either apartments or offices located on the second floor. The majority of the buildings were built in the 1920s. Notable buildings include the old fire station (c. 1920), Colonial Theater (1930), Waugh Department Store (1904), Rex Theater (1938), and Galax Municipal Building (1908).

It was listed on the National Register of Historic Places in 2002, with a boundary increase in 2008.
