= Carsonville, Virginia =

Unincorporated community in Virginia, United States

Coordinates: 36.677°N 81.070°W

Carsonville is an unincorporated community located in the Elk Creek district of Grayson County in the U.S. state of Virginia.
