= Tom Moxley =

American politician

Member of the Kansas House of Representatives from the 68th district
- In office January 8, 2007 – January 9, 2017
- Preceded by: Shari Weber
- Succeeded by: Dave Baker

Personal details
- Born: August 15, 1946 (age 79) Manhattan, Kansas, U.S.
- Party: Republican
- Spouse: Virginia
- Education: Kansas State University (BS)

Tom Moxley (August 15, 1946) is an American politician who served as a member of the Kansas House of Representatives for the 68th district from 2007 to 2017.

Moxley is the owner of the Moxley Management Company and Moxley Ranch. He is the founder of the Kansas Livestock Association Ranch Land Trust and Tall Grass Legacy Alliance.

Moxley earned a Bachelor of Science degree in animal science from Kansas State University.
