= Welch Commercial Historic District =

Historic district in West Virginia, United States

- U.S. National Register of Historic Places
- U.S. Historic district
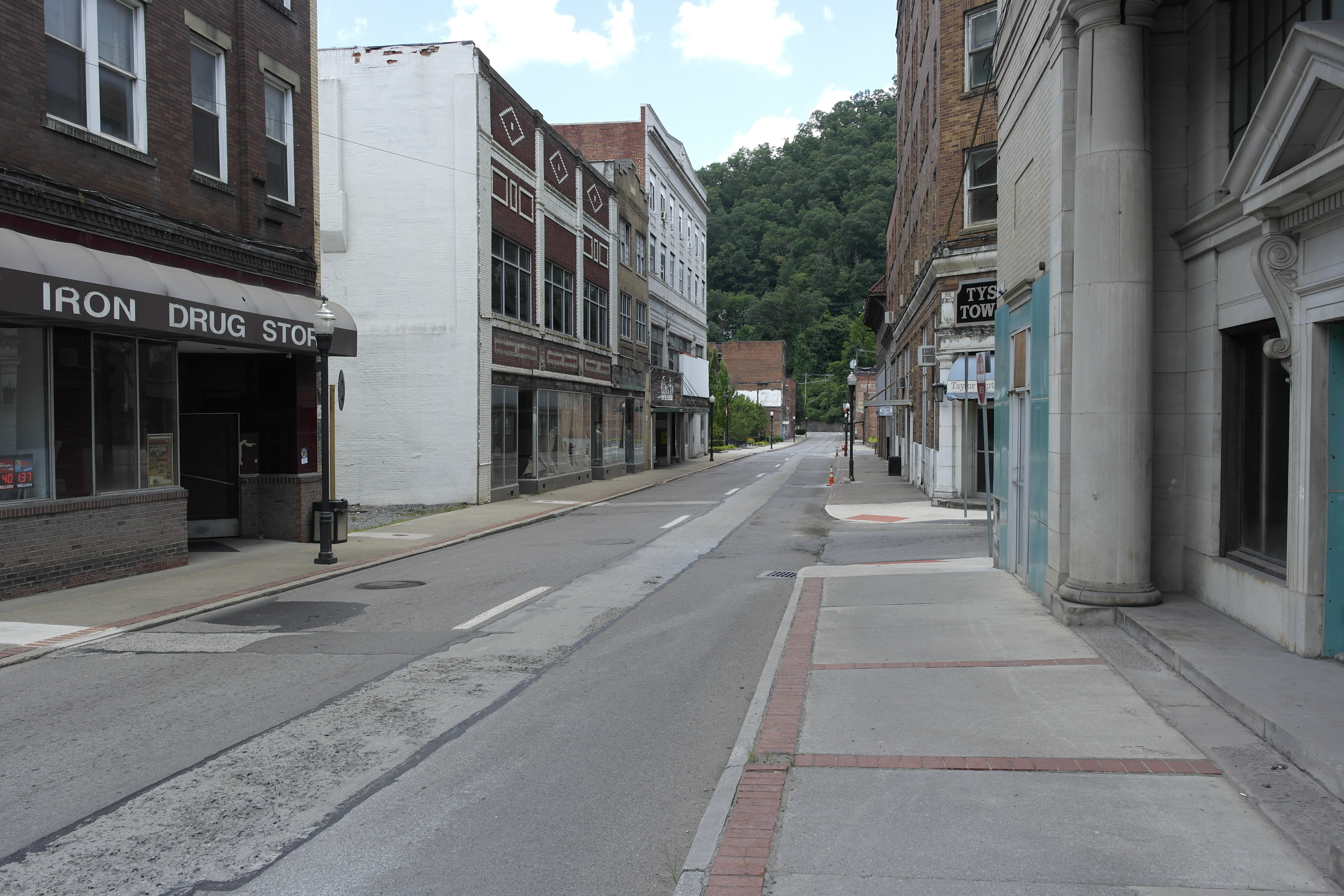
- McDowell Street in the district, in 2019. Building at left is the Flat Iron Building, although its shape is not apparent.

- Location within West Virginia Location within the United States
- Location: Roughly bounded by Wyoming St., Elkhorn Cr. and the Tug R., Welch, West Virginia
- Coordinates: 37°25′57″N 81°35′8″W
- Area: 10 acres (4.0 ha)
- Architectural style: Chicago, Commercial Style
- NRHP reference No.: 92000305 (original); 100003251 (increase)

Significant dates
- Added to NRHP: April 2, 1992
- Boundary increase: December 14, 2018

Welch Commercial Historic District is a national historic district located at Welch, McDowell County, West Virginia. The district includes 56 contributing buildings and one contributing structure in Welch's central business district. It includes a variety of retail stores, banks and offices, with some having apartment rental on their top floors. Also on the district is a municipal parking garage built in 1941. Notable buildings include, the Flat Iron Building (c. 1915), Babalis Building (c. 1925), Odd Fellows Temple (1929), Carter Hotel-Tyson Tower Building (1924), Wyoming-Elkhorn Apartment Building (c. 1920), McDowell County National Bank (1900), and McDowell County Courthouse Annex Building (1935).

The McDowell County Courthouse, built in 1893 and expanded in 1909, on the north side of Wyoming Street in Welch, was listed on the National Register in 1979. The district starts across Wyoming Street and runs west to the Tug Fork (aka Tug River) and south to Elkhorn Creek, covering the main commercial area of the town.

It was listed on the National Register of Historic Places in 1992, and its boundaries were increased in 2018.

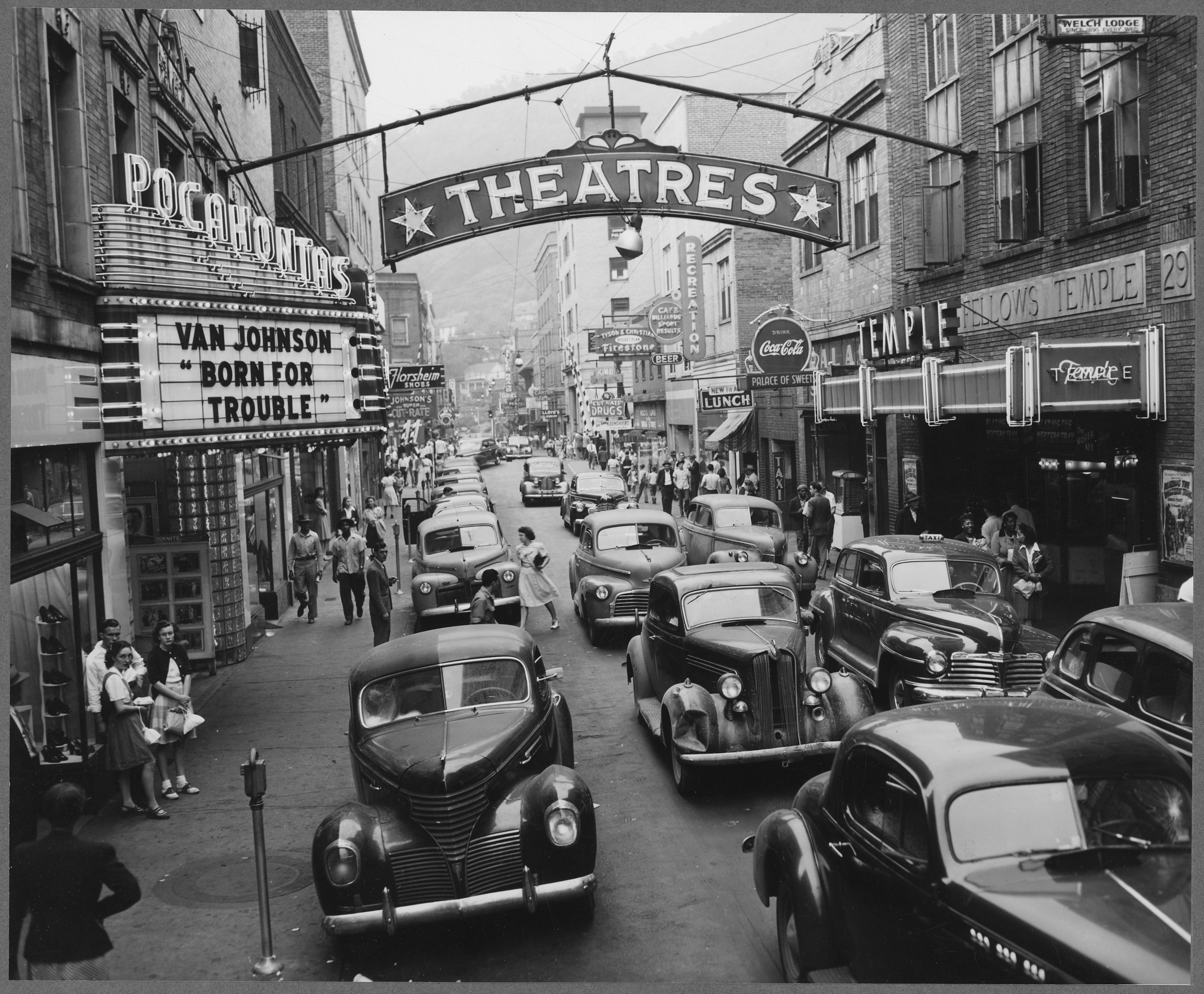
McDowell Street in 1946
