= Dr. Virgil Cox House =

Historic house in Virginia, United States

- U.S. National Register of Historic Places
- Virginia Landmarks Register
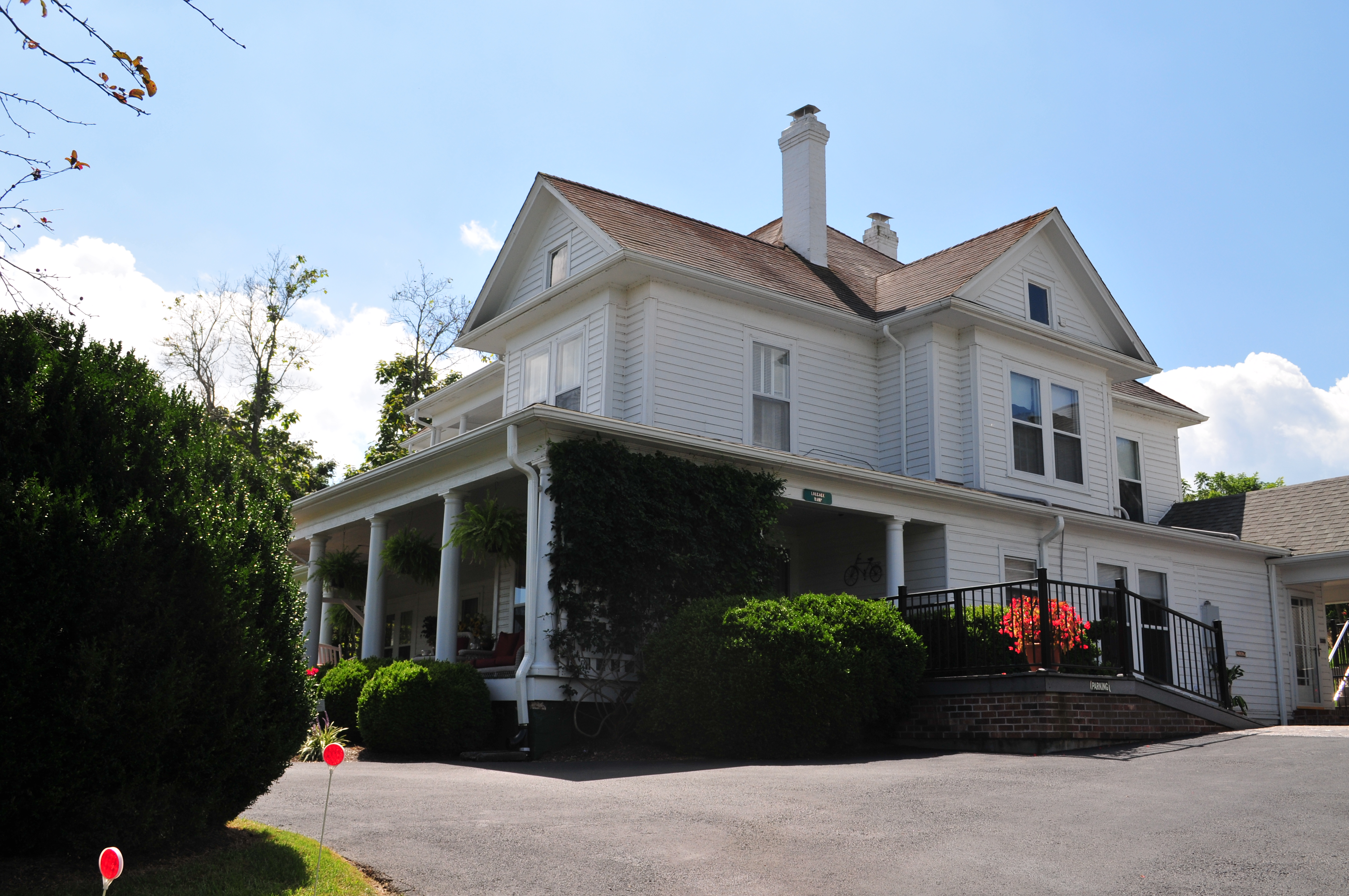

- Location within Virginia Location within the United States
- Location: 406 West Stuart Dr., Galax, Virginia
- Coordinates: 36°39′43″N 80°55′49″W
- Area: less than one acre
- Built: c. 1913
- Architectural style: Queen Anne, Colonial Revival
- NRHP reference No.: 04000476
- VLR No.: 113-5034

Significant dates
- Added to NRHP: May 19, 2004
- Designated VLR: March 17, 2004

Dr. Virgil Cox House is a historic home located at Galax, Virginia, owned by Virgil J. Cox. It was built about 1913, and is a large 2 1/2-story frame dwelling with Queen Anne and Colonial Revival style design elements. It has a complex exterior presentation, complex roof plan, and an equally complex floor plan. The house is sheathed in German siding and features irregular, front-gable projections on the facade and north side; a projection with a polygonal bay on the southwest corner, a gable-roof dormer on the facade; and a small, upper balcony on the facade with attenuated Tuscan columns and pilasters. Also on the property are a contributing boxwood garden and outbuilding.

It was listed on the National Register of Historic Places in 2004.
