= Gordon C. Felts House =

Historic house in Virginia, United States

- U.S. National Register of Historic Places
- Virginia Landmarks Register
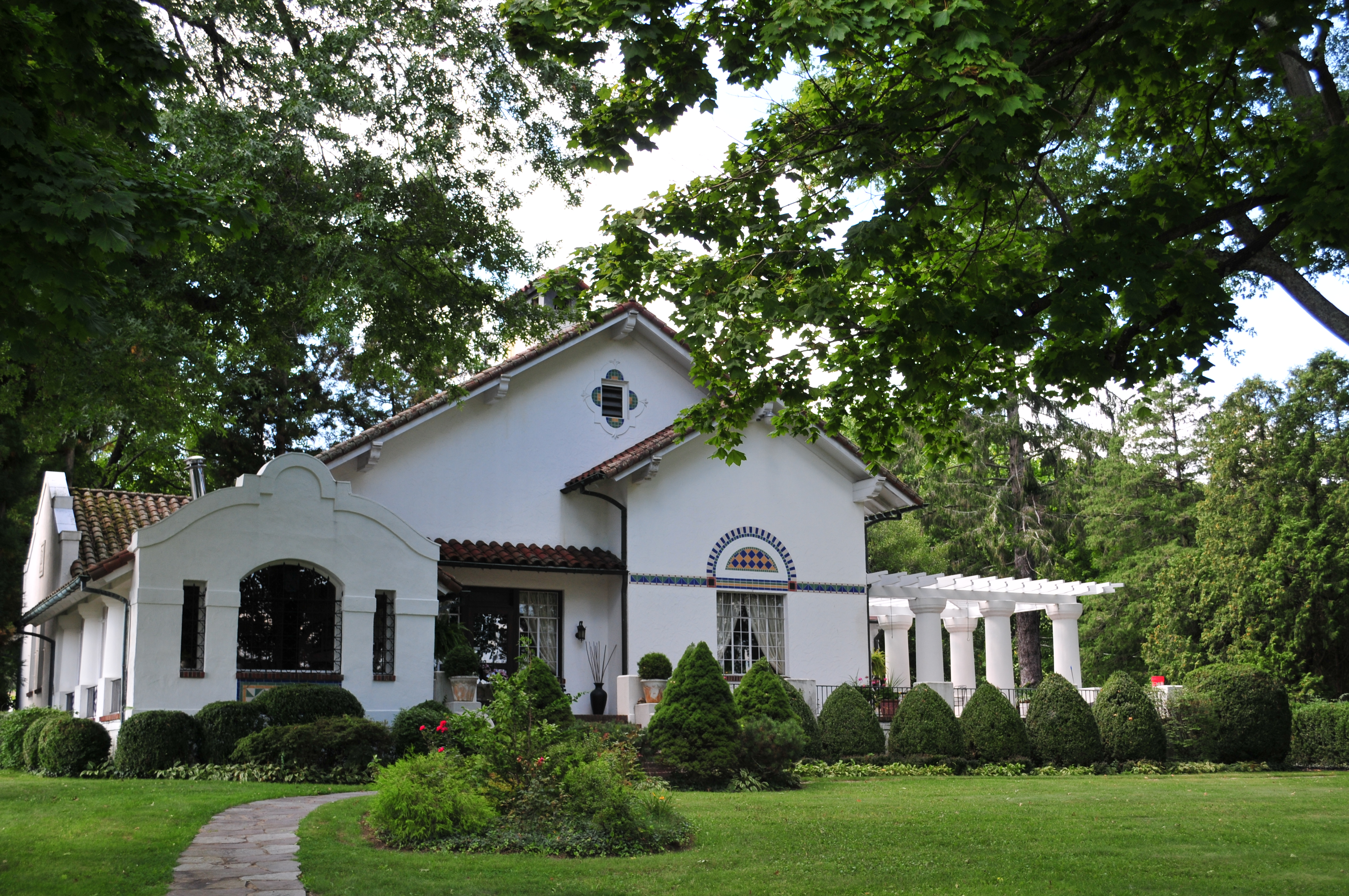

- Location within Virginia Location within the United States
- Location: 404 N. Main St., Galax, Virginia
- Coordinates: 36°39′54″N 80°55′42″W
- Area: 1.5 acres (0.61 ha)
- Built: 1930
- Architect: Garry & Sheffey
- Architectural style: Mission/spanish Revival
- NRHP reference No.: 01001572
- VLR No.: 113-5002

Significant dates
- Added to NRHP: February 5, 2002
- Designated VLR: June 14, 2000

Gordon C. Felts House is a historic home located at Galax, Virginia. It was completed in 1930, and is a large 2 1/2-story stuccoed brick dwelling in the Mission Revival style. It features a terra cotta mission style gabled roof. It also has a large bluestone terrace covered by a pergola supported by six large Grecian Doric order columns, on the south side the house has an enclosed sleeping porch defined with four large Grecian Doric columns. Also on the property are a contributing garage / apartment and playhouse. Currently owned by Nancy and Dr. Samuel B. Luague.

It was listed on the National Register of Historic Places in 2000.
