= Grayson County, Virginia =

County in Virginia, United States

- County
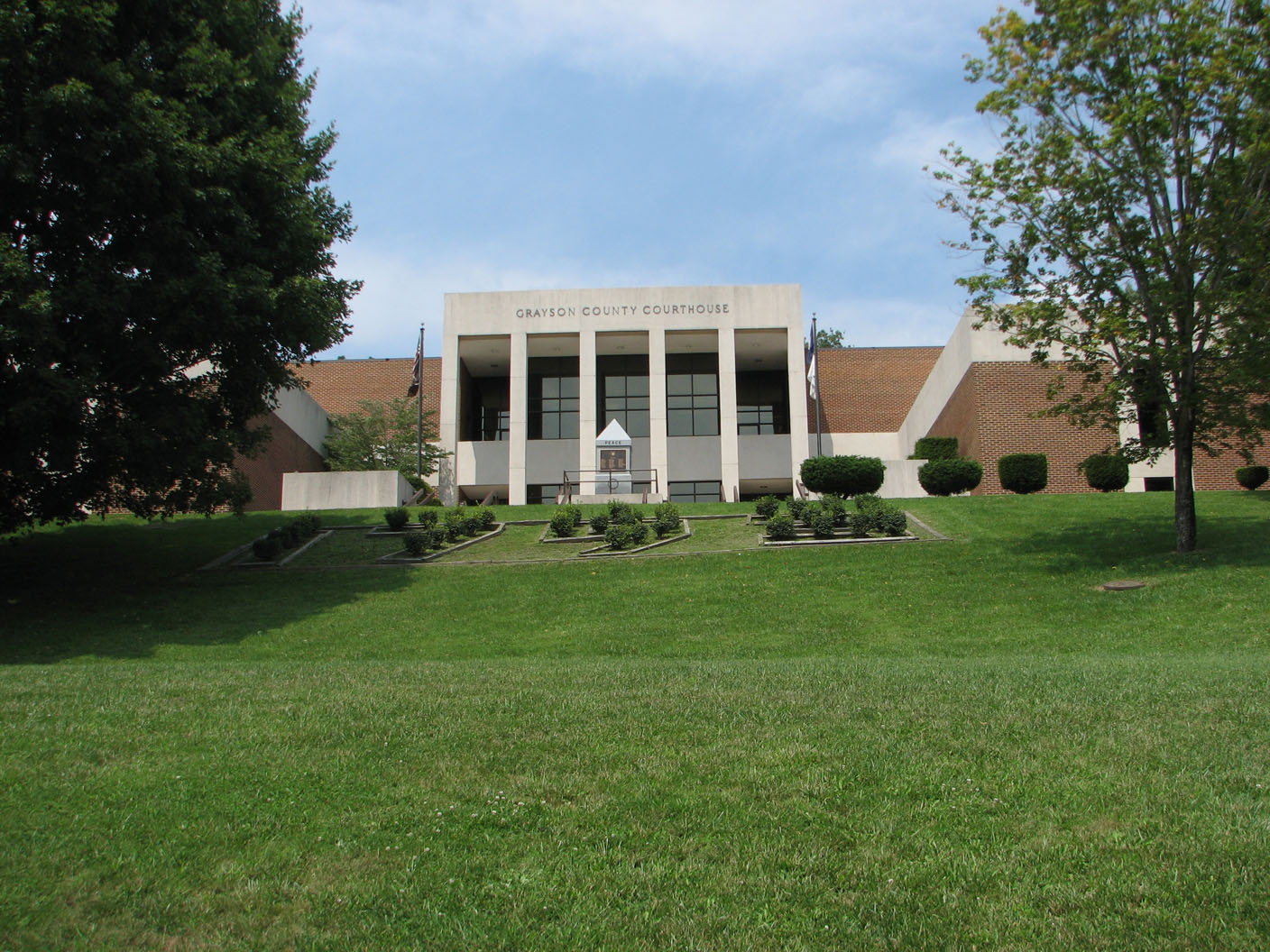
- Present-day Grayson County Courthouse

- Seal

- Location within the U.S. state of Virginia
- Coordinates: 36°39′N 81°14′W
- Country: United States
- State: Virginia
- Founded: 1793
- Named for: William Grayson
- Seat: Independence
- Largest town: Independence

Area
  - Total: 446 sq mi (1,160 km^{2})
  - Land: 442 sq mi (1,140 km^{2})
  - Water: 3.8 sq mi (9.8 km^{2}) 0.8%

Population (2020)
  - Total: 15,333
  - Estimate (2025): 15,230 ▼
  - Density: 34.7/sq mi (13.4/km^{2})
- Time zone: UTC−5 (Eastern)
  - Summer (DST): UTC−4 (EDT)
- Congressional district: 9th
- Website: www.graysoncountyva.gov

Grayson County is a county located in the southwestern part of the Commonwealth of Virginia. As of the 2020 census, the population was 15,333. Its county seat is Independence. Mount Rogers, the state's highest peak at 5,729 feet (1,746 m), is in Grayson County.

== History ==
Grayson County was founded in 1793 from part of Wythe County. It was named for William Grayson, delegate to the Continental Congress from 1784 to 1787 and one of the first two U.S. Senators from Virginia. The first courthouse was built in Greensville, later called Oldtown, constructed in 1794 and rebuilt beginning in 1832. In 1842, the Virginia General Assembly authorized the division of Grayson County, the northeastern portion becoming Carroll County.

During the American Civil War, little fighting occurred within Grayson County. However, the "Grayson Dare Devils" (Company F, 4th Regiment of the Stonewall Brigade) were recruited from the Elk Creek Valley of Grayson County shortly after Virginia seceded and sustained significant losses as the First Battle of Manassas. The Grayson Cavalry was Company C of the 8th Virginia Cavalry, which served until the war's end. Company D of the 50th Virginia Infantry was recruited in the Mouth of Wilson Community and they were known as the "Wilson Rifles."

The county seat since shortly before the American Civil War has been Independence, Virginia, since the former county seat had been centrally located until Carroll County split off (and Oldtown now is a district within Grayson county). The Old Grayson County Courthouse and Clerk's Office renovated circa 1834 still exists but is now located near what since 1953 is the independent city of Galax, Virginia. Even by 1890 the nearest railroad to Grayson county was nine miles from the county line, a Norfolk and Western Railway stop called "Rural Retreat." Textile and then furniture factories arrived in Galax (which was planned as a town near the old village of Blair on a plateau beginning in 1903 and renamed after a plant harvested from the surrounding mountains). Also, the New River was dammed at Fries to power a cotton mill, which also led to more direct service by the Norfolk and Western to Troutdale (which later faltered). Whitetop City and Fairwood also virtually disappeared during the Great Depression.

== Geography ==
According to the U.S. Census Bureau, the county has a total area of 446 square miles (1,160 km^{2}), of which 442 square miles (1,140 km^{2}) is land and 3.8 square miles (9.8 km^{2}) (0.8%) is water. Grayson County is one of the 423 counties served by the Appalachian Regional Commission, and it is identified as part of "Greater Appalachia" by Colin Woodard in his book American Nations: A History of the Eleven Rival Regional Cultures of North America.

The southernmost point in Virginia lies in Grayson County. Additionally, it is the only county in Virginia containing an Oceanic climate.

=== Adjacent counties ===
- Johnson County, Tennessee (southwest)
- Washington County (west)
- Smyth County (northwest)
- Wythe County (northeast)
- Ashe County, North Carolina (south)
- Alleghany County, North Carolina (south)
- Surry County, North Carolina (southeast)
- Independent City of Galax (east)
- Carroll County (east)

=== National protected areas ===
- Blue Ridge Parkway (part)
- Jefferson National Forest (part)
- Mount Rogers National Recreation Area (part)

=== Major highways ===
- US 21
- US 58
- US 221
- SR 16
- SR 89
- SR 93
- SR 94
- SR 274
- Blue Ridge Parkway

== Demographics ==
Historical population
Census	Pop.	Note	%±
1800	3,912		—
1810	4,941		26.3%
1820	5,598		13.3%
1830	7,675		37.1%
1840	9,087		18.4%
1850	6,677		−26.5%
1860	8,252		23.6%
1870	9,587		16.2%
1880	13,068		36.3%
1890	14,394		10.1%
1900	16,853		17.1%
1910	19,856		17.8%
1920	19,816		−0.2%
1930	20,017		1.0%
1940	21,916		9.5%
1950	21,379		−2.5%
1960	17,930		−16.1%
1970	15,439		−13.9%
1980	16,579		7.4%
1990	16,278		−1.8%
2000	17,917		10.1%
2010	15,533		−13.3%
2020	15,333		−1.3%
2025 (est.)	15,230	▼	−0.7%
U.S. Decennial Census; 1790-1960 1900-1990; 1990-2000 2010 2020

=== Racial and ethnic composition ===
Grayson County, Virginia – Racial and ethnic composition Note: the US Census treats Hispanic/Latino as an ethnic category. This table excludes Latinos from the racial categories and assigns them to a separate category. Hispanics/Latinos may be of any race.
Race / Ethnicity (NH = Non-Hispanic)	Pop 1980	Pop 1990	Pop 2000	Pop 2010	Pop 2020	% 1980	% 1990	% 2000	% 2010	% 2020
White alone (NH)	15,934	15,687	16,283	14,627	13,396	96.11%	96.37%	90.88%	94.17%	87.37%
Black or African American alone (NH)	546	486	1,214	317	887	3.29%	2.99%	6.78%	2.04%	5.78%
Native American or Alaska Native alone (NH)	10	12	20	30	26	0.06%	0.07%	0.11%	0.19%	0.17%
Asian alone (NH)	10	18	12	15	24	0.06%	0.11%	0.07%	0.10%	0.16%
Native Hawaiian or Pacific Islander alone (NH)	x	x	2	0	2	x	x	0.01%	0.00%	0.01%
Other race alone (NH)	6	0	4	7	30	0.04%	0.00%	0.02%	0.05%	0.20%
Mixed race or Multiracial (NH)	x	x	105	121	372	x	x	0.59%	0.78%	2.43%
Hispanic or Latino (any race)	73	75	277	416	596	0.44%	0.46%	1.55%	2.68%	3.89%
Total	16,579	16,278	17,917	15,533	15,333	100.00%	100.00%	100.00%	100.00%	100.00%

=== 2020 census ===
As of the 2020 census, the county had a population of 15,333. The median age was 49.6 years. 16.0% of residents were under the age of 18 and 25.7% of residents were 65 years of age or older. For every 100 females there were 110.3 males, and for every 100 females age 18 and over there were 111.4 males age 18 and over.

0.1% of residents lived in urban areas, while 99.9% lived in rural areas.

There were 6,512 households in the county, of which 20.7% had children under the age of 18 living with them and 25.7% had a female householder with no spouse or partner present. About 32.9% of all households were made up of individuals and 17.1% had someone living alone who was 65 years of age or older.

There were 8,924 housing units, of which 27.0% were vacant. Among occupied housing units, 77.5% were owner-occupied and 22.5% were renter-occupied. The homeowner vacancy rate was 2.6% and the rental vacancy rate was 8.5%.

=== 2000 Census ===
As of the census of 2000, there were 17,917 people, 7,259 households, and 5,088 families residing in the county. The population density was 40 people per square mile (15 people/km^{2}). There were 9,123 housing units at an average density of 21 units per square mile (8.1 units/km^{2}). The racial makeup of the county was 91.70% White, 6.79% Black or African American, 0.12% Native American, 0.07% Asian, 0.03% Pacific Islander, 0.70% from other races, and 0.60% from two or more races. 1.55% of the population were Hispanic or Latino of any race.

There were 7,259 households, out of which 26.40% had children under the living with them, 57.60% were married couples living together, 8.50% had a female householder with no husband present, and 29.90% were non-families. 26.80% of all households were made up of individuals, and 12.90% had someone living alone who was 65 years of age or older. The average household size was 2.31 and the average family size was 2.77.

In the county, the population was spread out, with 19.50% under the age of 18, 7.60% from 18 to 24, 29.80% from 25 to 44, 26.20% from 45 to 64, and 16.90% who were 65 years of age or older. The median age was 40 years. For every 100 females there were 107.70 males. For every 100 females aged 18 and over, there were 109.70 males.

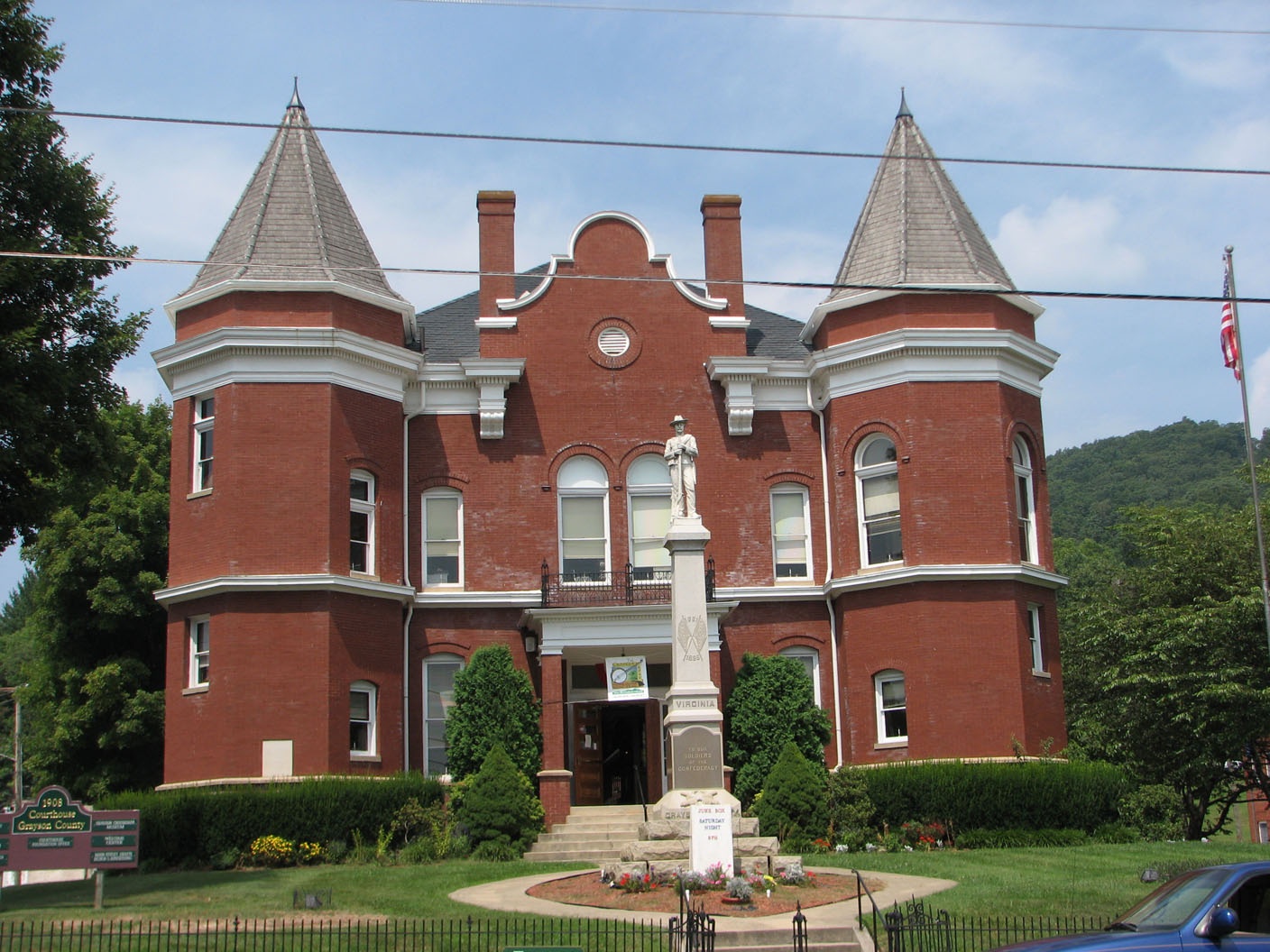
The Old Grayson County Courthouse, now used as a museum and site for public events.

The median income for a household in the county was $28,676, and the median income for a family was $35,076. Males had a median income of $24,126 versus $17,856 for females. The per capita income for the county was $16,768. About 10.00% of families and 13.60% of the population were below the poverty line, including 18.80% of those under age 18 and 16.30% of those age 65 or over.

== Economy ==
Grayson is economically isolated, without an Interstate Highway and surrounded by mountains. It struggled to attract and retain business; a situation made much worse beginning in 2009 with the recession. 20,000 acres are being exploited for growing industrial Christmas trees; migrant laborer workers are transported to complete the risky jobs. Like much of Southwest Virginia, losses of jobs in the furniture and textile sectors resulted in an unemployment rate of 14.6%. In order to create jobs the new but idle River North Correctional Center was activated by the state brought in several hundred jobs. Local efforts were successful in retaining Core Fitness' Nautilus facility as the largest employer in the county and integrating local businesses as part of their supply chain, though the business laid off all employees by 2020. suffered significant losses in a fire in November 2012 which forced it to relocate operations to North Carolina. Efforts by the county led to the company rebuilding and reopening its facility in 2014 with 125 jobs. By 2014 a focus on job creation brought additional business operations and 300 more jobs to the county and resulted in an unemployment rate of only 6.9%. Unemployment got as low as 2.8% in April 2019 but then rose significantly during the COVID pandemic before returning to rates in the 2%-3% range.

== Government ==
In 2009, the county was in dire financial condition due to broader trends in the economy. The county debt was $18.3 million and operational expenses were being paid by added borrowing. By 2015 the county had reversed its fiscal direction along with much of the region due to the economic recovery.

=== Board of Supervisors ===
- At-Large District: Mitchell D. Cornett (R)
- Elk Creek District: Tracy "Zeke" Anderson (R)
- Oldtown District: Mary E. Dickenson Tomlinson (I)
- Providence District: Mike Hash (R)
- Wilson District: Brant Ivey (R)

=== Constitutional officers ===
Office	Person	Political party
Clerk of the Circuit Court ‡	Susan M. Herrington	(R)
Commissioner of the Revenue	Larry D. Bolt	(R)
Commonwealth's Attorney ‡	Brandon R. Boyles	(R)
Sheriff ‡	Richard A. Vaughan	(I)
Treasurer	R. Pete Hall, Jr.	(R)

‡Positions shared with Galax City.

=== Legislative representation ===
Grayson is represented by Republican William M. "Bill" Stanley Jr. in the Virginia Senate, Republican Israel D. O'Quinn in the Virginia House of Delegates, and Republican H. Morgan Griffith in the U.S. House of Representatives.

United States presidential election results for Grayson County, Virginia
Year	Republican		Democratic		Third party(ies)	
Year	No.	%	No.	%	No.	%
1912	832	42.32%	842	42.83%	292	14.85%
1916	1,244	56.16%	967	43.66%	4	0.18%
1920	2,153	54.73%	1,781	45.27%	0	0.00%
1924	1,442	46.88%	1,611	52.37%	23	0.75%
1928	2,728	61.43%	1,713	38.57%	0	0.00%
1932	1,624	41.03%	2,306	58.26%	28	0.71%
1936	3,343	52.63%	3,005	47.31%	4	0.06%
1940	2,806	50.78%	2,703	48.91%	17	0.31%
1944	3,298	55.77%	2,607	44.08%	9	0.15%
1948	3,669	55.86%	2,741	41.73%	158	2.41%
1952	4,449	61.78%	2,734	37.97%	18	0.25%
1956	4,039	62.18%	2,426	37.35%	31	0.48%
1960	3,893	58.65%	2,738	41.25%	7	0.11%
1964	3,105	48.88%	3,238	50.98%	9	0.14%
1968	3,563	54.09%	1,926	29.24%	1,098	16.67%
1972	3,565	67.48%	1,603	30.34%	115	2.18%
1976	3,021	48.33%	3,146	50.33%	84	1.34%
1980	3,494	53.37%	2,875	43.91%	178	2.72%
1984	4,508	65.43%	2,319	33.66%	63	0.91%
1988	3,968	61.51%	2,441	37.84%	42	0.65%
1992	3,378	48.68%	2,615	37.69%	946	13.63%
1996	3,004	46.92%	2,661	41.56%	738	11.53%
2000	4,236	61.82%	2,467	36.00%	149	2.17%
2004	4,655	65.22%	2,430	34.05%	52	0.73%
2008	4,540	62.88%	2,480	34.35%	200	2.77%
2012	4,801	67.42%	2,068	29.04%	252	3.54%
2016	5,592	76.76%	1,407	19.31%	286	3.93%
2020	6,529	80.30%	1,535	18.88%	67	0.82%
2024	6,544	80.60%	1,503	18.51%	72	0.89%

== Education ==
=== Public high school ===
- Grayson County High School, Independence

=== Private high school ===
- Oak Hill Academy, Mouth of Wilson

== Culture ==
Located in the Appalachian region of the United States, Grayson County has long been famous for its traditional, or "old-time" music and musicians. Although the entire Appalachian region is known for its music, the region around Mount Airy, North Carolina and Galax, Virginia is one of the areas where this music has remained strongest, even among young people. The Old Fiddler's Convention, one of the most prominent traditional music contests in the United States, has been held annually in Galax since 1935. Grayson County is also the home of other fiddlers' conventions and old time and bluegrass festivals such as the Grayson County Fiddlers Convention, Fries Fiddlers Convention, and the Wayne C. Henderson Guitar Festival. The Whitetop Mountain Band, The New Ballards Branch Bogtrotters, The Wolfe Brothers String Band, and the Konnarock Critters are among many of the best known old time bands of the area.

== Communities ==
=== Towns ===
- Fries
- Independence
- Troutdale

=== Census-designated places ===
- Baywood
- Hilltown (partly in Carroll County)
- Stevens Creek

=== Other unincorporated communities ===
- Carsonville
- Comers Rock
- Elk Creek
- Fairview
- Flat Ridge
- Grant
- Mouth of Wilson
- Rugby
- Volney

== Notable people ==
- John Calhoun Dickenson (1815-1890), planter and politician
- Henry Whitter (1892–1941), early country musician
- Wade Ward (1892–1971), old-time country music banjo player and fiddler
- Estil C. Ball (1913–1978), singer-songwriter, fingerstyle guitarist, and country, gospel and folk musician
- Wayne Henderson, guitar maker and fingerstyle guitar player
- Kenneth Y. Tomlinson, former editor of Reader's Digest

== See also ==
- National Register of Historic Places in Grayson County, Virginia
- North Carolina–Tennessee–Virginia Corners
- Grayson Highlands State Park
