= Galax, Virginia =

Independent city in Virginia, United States

- Independent city
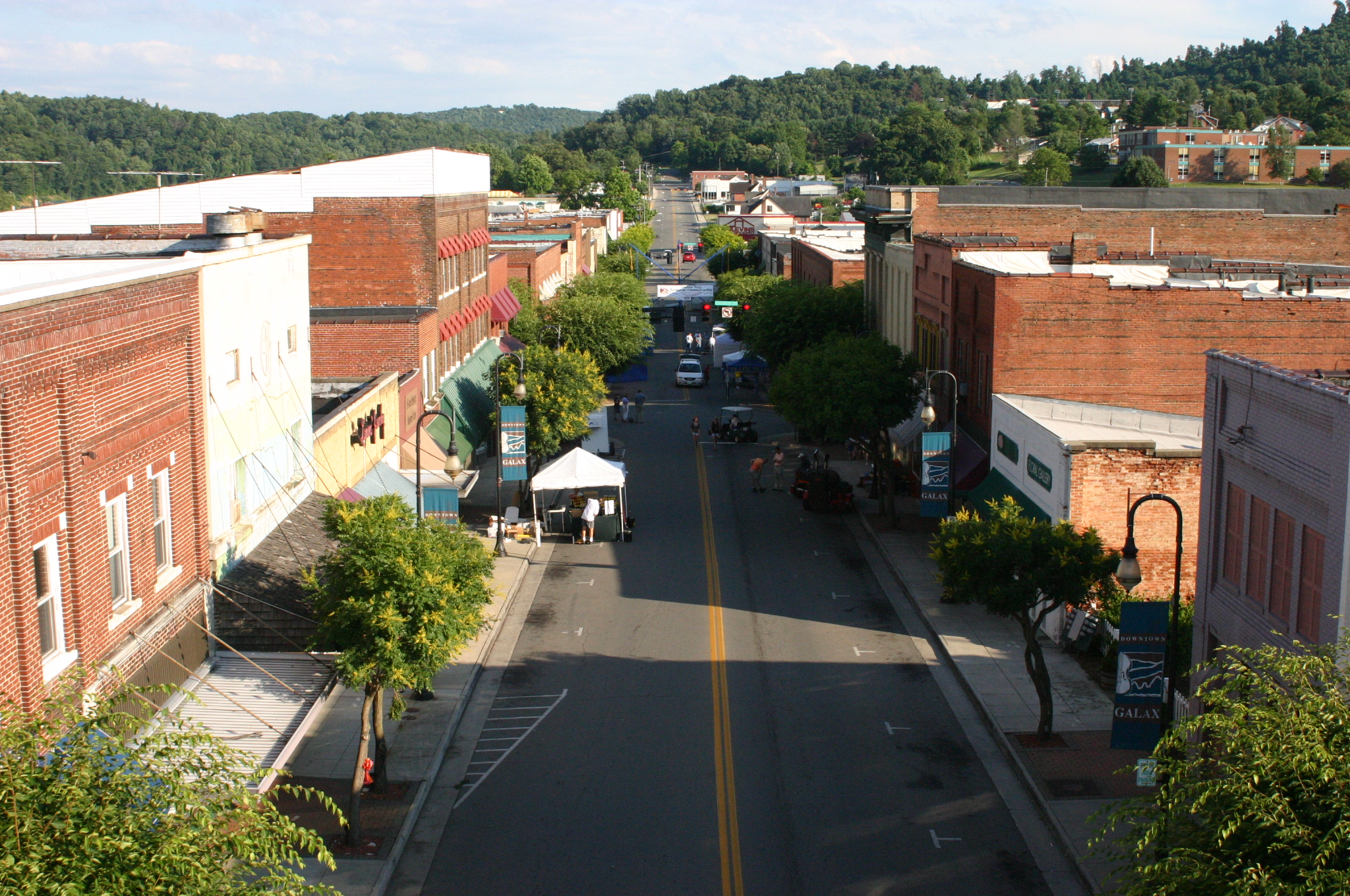
- Central Galax

- Seal

- Galax in Virginia

- Location within Virginia Location within the United States
- Coordinates: 36°39′52″N 80°55′12″W
- Country: United States
- State: Virginia
- County: None (Independent city)

Government
  - Type: Council-Manager
  - Mayor: Beth C. White
  - City Manager: Michael Burnette

Area
  - Total: 8.28 sq mi (21.44 km^{2})
  - Land: 8.24 sq mi (21.33 km^{2})
  - Water: 0.042 sq mi (0.11 km^{2})
- Elevation: 2,372 ft (723 m)

Population (2020)
  - Total: 6,720
  - Estimate (2025): 6,670 ▼
  - Density: 816/sq mi (315/km^{2})
- Time zone: UTC−5 (Eastern (EST))
  - Summer (DST): UTC−4 (EDT)
- ZIP Code: 24333
- Area code: 276
- FIPS code: 51-30208
- GNIS feature ID: 1483573
- Website: www.galaxva.com

Galax /ˈɡeɪlæks/ is an independent city in the southwestern part of the Commonwealth of Virginia, in the United States. As of the 2020 census, the population was 6,720.

The Bureau of Economic Analysis combines the city of Galax with neighboring Carroll County for statistical purposes. Galax is bounded to the northeast by Carroll County and to the southwest by Grayson County.

== History ==
The area that later became Galax was part of an 800-acre (320 ha) land grant given to James Buchanan in 1756 by the British Crown. The first plat map for Galax is dated December 1903; the town founders selected the site for the city on a wide expanse of meadowland bisected by Chestnut Creek and sitting at an altitude of 2,500 feet (760 m) on a plateau. The Virginia General Assembly officially chartered the town of Galax in 1906.

The town is named for Galax urceolata, an evergreen groundcover plant found throughout the Blue Ridge Mountains. At the time, the plant was gathered and sold by many people in southwestern Virginia and northwestern North Carolina as an ornamental plant; a Norfolk and Western Railway Company official suggested that the town be named for the plant. The first Galax Agricultural Fair took place in September 1908, when Galax had 600 residents.

In the past, Galax was an industrial town; by the 1960s, Galax was home to six furniture factories, a mirror factory, at least four textile companies, two large department stores, a lumber company, Carnation Milk, Coca-Cola Bottling Company, and Clover Creamery.

The Town of Galax was separated from Carroll and Grayson counties and became an independent city on December 6, 1953.

In the 2000s, Galax and other small neighboring communities in southwestern Virginia joined with private businesses to create the Wired Road Authority, a public-private partnership that in 2009 created open-access, integrated regional broadband network with 100-megabit connections and in 2013 created gigabit connections. This was part of an economic-development effort.

The Old Grayson County Courthouse and Clerk's Office, Dr. Virgil Cox House, Gordon C. Felts House, Galax Commercial Historic District and A. G. Pless Jr. House are listed on the National Register of Historic Places.

== Geography ==
According to the United States Census Bureau, the city has a total area of 8.3 square miles (21 km^{2}), all land.

=== Climate ===
Long-term temperature and precipitation records describe the city's climate as an oceanic climate (Cfb) with monthly averages ranging from 32.5° to 70.7 °F in January and July, respectively. The hardiness zone is 6b.

Climate data for Galax Water Plant, Virginia (1991–2020 normals, extremes 1907–present)
Month	Jan	Feb	Mar	Apr	May	Jun	Jul	Aug	Sep	Oct	Nov	Dec	Year
Record high °F (°C)	76 (24)	74 (23)	82 (28)	96 (36)	95 (35)	97 (36)	95 (35)	93 (34)	91 (33)	89 (32)	78 (26)	71 (22)	97 (36)
Mean daily maximum °F (°C)	43.4 (6.3)	46.9 (8.3)	53.9 (12.2)	64.2 (17.9)	72.3 (22.4)	79.3 (26.3)	81.7 (27.6)	80.9 (27.2)	75.5 (24.2)	66.2 (19.0)	55.1 (12.8)	46.7 (8.2)	63.8 (17.7)
Daily mean °F (°C)	33.5 (0.8)	36.3 (2.4)	42.5 (5.8)	51.9 (11.1)	60.5 (15.8)	67.7 (19.8)	71.5 (21.9)	70.3 (21.3)	64.5 (18.1)	54.0 (12.2)	43.5 (6.4)	36.6 (2.6)	52.7 (11.5)
Mean daily minimum °F (°C)	23.7 (−4.6)	25.6 (−3.6)	31.0 (−0.6)	39.6 (4.2)	48.7 (9.3)	56.2 (13.4)	61.3 (16.3)	59.7 (15.4)	53.5 (11.9)	41.7 (5.4)	31.9 (−0.1)	26.5 (−3.1)	41.6 (5.3)
Record low °F (°C)	−6 (−21)	−4 (−20)	7 (−14)	19 (−7)	25 (−4)	34 (1)	42 (6)	39 (4)	30 (−1)	20 (−7)	3 (−16)	0 (−18)	−6 (−21)
Average precipitation inches (mm)	3.20 (81)	2.86 (73)	4.36 (111)	4.76 (121)	5.28 (134)	4.36 (111)	5.23 (133)	3.89 (99)	5.42 (138)	4.05 (103)	3.85 (98)	3.69 (94)	50.95 (1,294)
Average precipitation days (≥ 0.01 in)	10.6	10.1	10.5	11.9	13.9	13.0	14.7	13.8	11.7	10.0	8.3	11.1	139.6
Source: NOAA

== Demographics ==
Historical population
Census	Pop.	Note	%±
1910	755		—
1920	1,250		65.6%
1930	2,544		103.5%
1940	3,195		25.6%
1950	5,248		64.3%
1960	5,254		0.1%
1970	6,278		19.5%
1980	6,524		3.9%
1990	6,670		2.2%
2000	6,837		2.5%
2010	7,042		3.0%
2020	6,720		−4.6%
2025 (est.)	6,670	▼	−0.7%
U.S. Decennial Census; 1790–1960 1900–1990; 1990–2000 2010 2020

=== Racial and ethnic composition ===
Galax city, Virginia – Racial and ethnic composition Note: the US Census treats Hispanic/Latino as an ethnic category. This table excludes Latinos from the racial categories and assigns them to a separate category. Hispanics/Latinos may be of any race.
Race / Ethnicity (NH = Non-Hispanic)	Pop 1980	Pop 1990	Pop 2000	Pop 2010	Pop 2020	% 1980	% 1990	% 2000	% 2010	% 2020
White alone (NH)	6,142	6,192	5,549	5,501	4,975	94.14%	92.83%	81.16%	78.12%	74.03%
Black or African American alone (NH)	305	387	412	407	354	4.68%	5.80%	6.03%	5.78%	5.27%
Native American or Alaska Native alone (NH)	11	8	21	7	13	0.17%	0.12%	0.31%	0.10%	0.19%
Asian alone (NH)	5	15	47	37	52	0.08%	0.22%	0.69%	0.53%	0.77%
Native Hawaiian or Pacific Islander alone (NH)	x	x	1	3	0	x	x	0.01%	0.04%	0.00%
Other race alone (NH)	2	3	0	7	15	0.03%	0.04%	0.00%	0.10%	0.22%
Mixed race or Multiracial (NH)	x	x	50	91	250	x	x	0.73%	1.29%	3.72%
Hispanic or Latino (any race)	59	65	757	989	1,061	0.90%	0.97%	11.07%	14.04%	15.79%
Total	6,524	6,670	6,837	7,042	6,720	100.00%	100.00%	100.00%	100.00%	100.00%

=== 2020 census ===
As of the 2020 census, Galax had a population of 6,720. The median age was 43.9 years. 20.9% of residents were under the age of 18 and 23.0% of residents were 65 years of age or older. For every 100 females there were 88.3 males, and for every 100 females age 18 and over there were 85.3 males age 18 and over.

90.1% of residents lived in urban areas, while 9.9% lived in rural areas.

There were 2,830 households in Galax, of which 27.2% had children under the age of 18 living in them. Of all households, 38.9% were married-couple households, 19.4% were households with a male householder and no spouse or partner present, and 34.8% were households with a female householder and no spouse or partner present. About 35.3% of all households were made up of individuals and 16.8% had someone living alone who was 65 years of age or older.

There were 3,156 housing units, of which 10.3% were vacant. The homeowner vacancy rate was 2.2% and the rental vacancy rate was 3.9%.

Racial composition as of the 2020 census
Race	Number	Percent
White	5,233	77.9%
Black or African American	367	5.5%
American Indian and Alaska Native	33	0.5%
Asian	52	0.8%
Native Hawaiian and Other Pacific Islander	1	0.0%
Some other race	626	9.3%
Two or more races	408	6.1%
Hispanic or Latino (of any race)	1,061	15.8%

=== 2000 census ===
As of the census of 2000, there were 6,837 people, 2,950 households, and 1,843 families residing in the city. The population density was 830.9 people per square mile (320.8 people/km^{2}). There were 3,217 housing units at an average density of 391.0 units per square mile (151.0 units/km^{2}). The racial makeup of the city was 86.11% White, 6.26% Black or African American, 0.45% Native American, 0.70% Asian, 0.01% Pacific Islander, 5.51% from other races, and 0.95% from two or more races. Hispanic or Latino of any race were 11.07% of the population.

There were 2,950 households, out of which 27.6% had children under the age of 18 living with them, 46.0% were married couples living together, 12.7% had a female householder with no husband present, and 37.5% were non-families. 34.2% of all households were made up of individuals, and 14.9% had someone living alone who was 65 years of age or older. The average household size was 2.27 and the average family size was 2.90.

In the city, the population was spread out, with 23.0% under the age of 18, 7.9% from 18 to 24, 26.4% from 25 to 44, 23.5% from 45 to 64, and 19.2% who were 65 years of age or older. The median age was 40 years. For every 100 females, there were 90.6 males. For every 100 females aged 18 and over, there were 84.1 males.

The median income for a household in the city was $28,236, and the median income for a family was $36,832. Males had a median income of $24,013 versus $18,393 for females. The per capita income for the city was $17,447. About 13.6% of families and 18.6% of the population were below the poverty line, including 26.8% of those under age 18 and 21.4% of those age 65 or over.

== Economy ==
Galax has historically been a center of furniture manufacturing. In 2014, the Vaughan-Bassett Furniture Co., which manufactures bedroom furniture, employed 700 people in Galax and was reported to be unusually successful in an era when many U.S. factories closed due to globalization. The company won $46 million in an anti-dumping case against China, which allowed the factory to keep running. In 2012, Vaughan-Bassett announced an $8 million expansion, including $4.5 million in new equipment and machinery upgrades and $1.5 million to purchase the old Webb Furniture Enterprises plant (which had closed in January 2006, eliminating 309 jobs).

Separate from the Vaughan-Bassett Furniture Co. was the Vaughan Furniture Co., which is a different business owned by the Bassett family. Established in 1923, the Vaughan Furniture Co. was a privately held company that at its peak owned five factories (two of them in Galax) and employed more than 1,800 workers. Beginning in 2002, imported furniture from Mexico and then China disrupted U.S. manufacturing, leading to the company's decline. In 2008, Vaughan Furniture Co. closed its last factory in Galax, laying off 275 employees. At the end of 2014, the company announced its impending closure after 91 years.

An economic analysis of southwestern Virginia cities and counties found that Galax had the highest increase in travel expenditures from 2004 to 2012, at 71.4%. The report found that "Galax, a city once dominated by industry, has become a blossoming tourism destination thanks to downtown revitalization efforts, its traditional music and arts scene (Old Fiddlers Convention, Chestnut School of the Arts), and its proximity to the Blue Ridge Parkway and the New River."

The Crossroads Rural Entrepreneurial Institute opened in Galax in 2005.

== Arts and culture ==
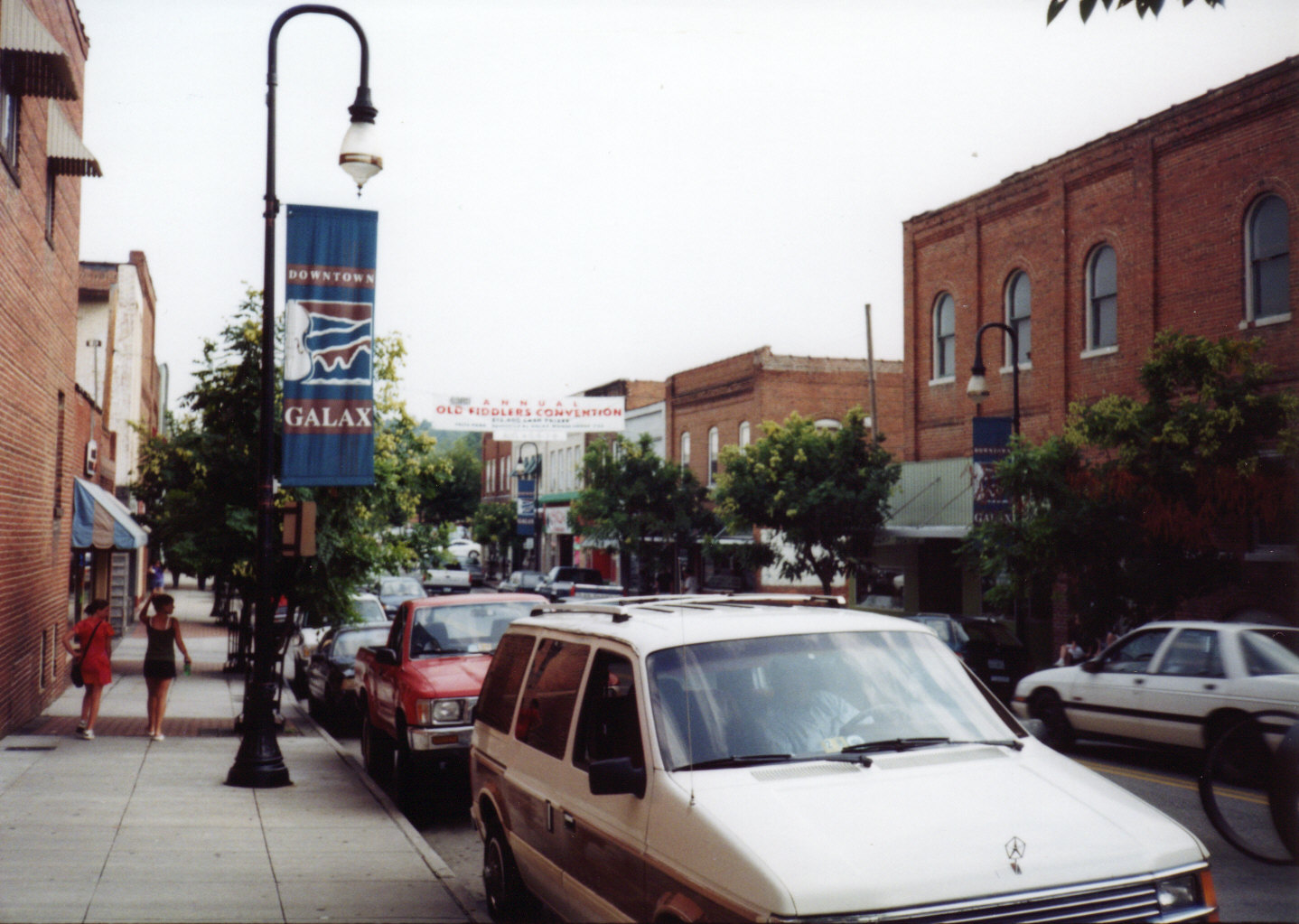
Downtown Galax, Virginia

Located in the Appalachian region of the United States, Galax is known as a center of traditional "old-time" music and musicians, as is Round Peak, North Carolina near Mount Airy, some 15 miles away on the other side of the ridge. Galax and the surrounding region are also known for traditional instrument-making; A distinctive style of Appalachian dulcimer is named for Galax.

The annual Old Fiddler's Convention, held in Galax since 1935, is a popular old-time and bluegrass music festival.

== Parks and recreation ==
The New River Trail State Park, a 57-mile state park following an abandoned railroad right-of-way, passes through the city of Galax and four nearby counties. The park is used by hikers, horseback riders, fishermen, canoeists, boaters, and cyclists, and features two tunnels, three major bridges, almost 30 smaller bridges and trestles, and a historic shot tower.

== Government ==
United States presidential election results for Galax, Virginia
Year	Republican		Democratic		Third party(ies)	
Year	No.	%	No.	%	No.	%
1956	761	68.31%	346	31.06%	7	0.63%
1960	867	62.96%	508	36.89%	2	0.15%
1964	697	49.22%	717	50.64%	2	0.14%
1968	1,257	54.44%	748	32.39%	304	13.17%
1972	1,497	72.63%	524	25.42%	40	1.94%
1976	1,128	47.59%	1,218	51.39%	24	1.01%
1980	1,188	51.81%	1,061	46.27%	44	1.92%
1984	1,548	65.18%	814	34.27%	13	0.55%
1988	1,278	58.09%	907	41.23%	15	0.68%
1992	1,087	46.37%	957	40.83%	300	12.80%
1996	910	41.72%	1,033	47.36%	238	10.91%
2000	1,160	52.42%	996	45.01%	57	2.58%
2004	1,336	57.22%	987	42.27%	12	0.51%
2008	1,317	54.83%	1,052	43.80%	33	1.37%
2012	1,332	58.50%	900	39.53%	45	1.98%
2016	1,603	67.47%	681	28.66%	92	3.87%
2020	1,838	69.67%	777	29.45%	23	0.87%
2024	1,946	71.52%	753	27.67%	22	0.81%

Galax utilizes as a council-manager form of government. The mayor of Galax is Willie Greene and the city manager is, as of April 2024, Michael Burnette.

Galax has voted for the Republican Presidential candidate in each of the last seven elections, with the last three Democratic nominees not cracking thirty percent of the vote, in accordance with trends throughout the Upland South and Appalachia.

== Education ==
Galax is served by the Galax City Public School Division.

- High School: Galax High School (serving grades 9 through 12)
- Middle School: Galax Middle School (serving grades 6 through 8)
- Elementary School: Galax Elementary School (serving prekindergarten through grade 5)

== Notable people ==
- Kylene Barker, Miss America 1979
- Eddie Bond, singer and musician
- Nancy Melvina Caldwell, member of the Virginia House of Delegates
- Charles William Carrico Sr., member of the Senate of Virginia
- Virgil J. Cox, physician and state delegate
- Bobby Dodd, College Football Hall of Fame as player and coach
- Dori Freeman, singer and songwriter
- Charlie Higgins, old-time fiddle player
- Mary Holland, actress and comedian
- Penelope W. Kyle, president of Radford University 2005 to June 2016
- Bart Lundy, NCAA college basketball coach High Point University, Marquette University, Queens University of Charlotte
- Tom McKnight, professional golfer Champions Tour
- Charles B. Morris, Medal of Honor recipient
- Larry Richardson, American bluegrass and old-time banjoist and guitarist
- Betsy Rutherford, old-time country music singer and recording artist
- Jim Scott, Virginia state legislator
- Ernest Stoneman, early country music recording artist
- Jack Kenny Williams, 17th President of Texas A&M University

== See also ==
- Mountain View, Arkansas, a city with similar music culture in the Ozark Mountains
- National Register of Historic Places in Galax, Virginia
