= 920s =

Decade

The 920s decade ran from January 1, 920, to December 31, 929.

== Events ==
=== 920 ===
==== By place ====
====== Byzantine Empire ======
- December 17 – Romanos I has himself crowned co-emperor of the Byzantine Empire. He shares the throne with the 15-year-old Constantine VII (his son-in-law), and constructs an alternative palace at Constantinople with an adjoining monastery near the Great Palace. Though Constantine retains his formal position as first on the protocol list, Romanos becomes sole ruler.

====== Europe ======
- The nobles of Lotharingia under Gilbert, duke of Lorraine, revolt against King Charles III ("the Simple"). They recognize King Henry I ("the Fowler") as their sovereign. Charles invades Lotharingia as far as Pfeddersheim (near Worms), but retreats when he learns that Henry is mobilizing an army to attack the West Frankish Kingdom.
- Henry I conquers Utrecht (modern-day Netherlands), which has been in possession of the Vikings for 70 years. Balderic, bishop of Utrecht, moves his seat back from Deventer to Utrecht (approximate date).

====== Britain ======
- High-Reeve Ealdred I, ruler of the former kingdom of Bernicia (Northumbria), and his brother Uhtred, submit to the overlordship of King Edward the Elder (approximate date).
- The Welsh ruler Hywel Dda ("the Good") merges Dyfed and Seisyllwg, establishing a new kingdom known as Deheubarth.

====== Iberian Peninsula ======
- July 26 — At the Battle of Valdejunquera, the Muslim forces of the Emir Abd-ar-Rahman III of Córdoba, defeat the Christian armies of King Ordoño II of León and King Sancho I of Pamplona. The decisive battle at the Val de Junquera takes place following the Emir's pre-emptive strike and his invasion of the upper Douro valley and the capture of Osma. The Arab army proceeds on to the upper Ebro, restoring and replenishing Umayyad garrisons in the region.

====== Africa ======
- The Golden Age of the Ghana Empire begins in Africa (approximate date).

====== Asia ======
- Emperor Taizu of the Khitan Empire orders the adoption of a written script by the Khitan, resulting in the creation of Khitan "Large Script."

==== By topic ====
====== Climate ======
- Muslim chroniclers in Baghdad record an unusually cold summer.

=== 921 ===
==== By place ====
====== Byzantine Empire ======
- March – Battle of Pegae: Bulgarian forces under kavhan (first minister) Theodore Sigritsa defeat the Byzantine army at the outskirts of Constantinople. After the battle, the Bulgarians burn the palaces in Pegae ("the Spring"), and devastate the area north of the Golden Horn.

====== Europe ======
- Summer – King Henry I (the Fowler) defeats his rival Arnulf I (the Bad), duke of Bavaria, in two campaigns. Arnulf is besieged at Regensburg and forced to accept peace negotiations, recognising Henry as sole sovereign of the East Frankish Kingdom (Germany).
- Landulf I, prince of Benevento, supports an anti-Greek Apulian rebellion, ravaging several Byzantine strongpoints as far as Ascoli. The Apulian nobility, professing loyalty to the Byzantine Empire, appoints Landulf as stratego of the Theme of Longobardia.
- September 15 – Ludmila, Bohemian duchess and widow of Bořivoj I, is murdered by her daughter-in-law Drahomíra at Tetín (modern Czech Republic). Ludmila will be canonised and become the patron saint of Bohemia and is venerated in the Orthodox and the Catholic Churches.
- November 7 – Treaty of Bonn: King Charles III (the Simple) and Henry I sign a peace treaty or 'pact of friendship' (amicitia) at a ceremony aboard a ship in the middle of the Rhine, recognising the border between their two Frankish kingdoms.
- A Hungarian mercenary force led by Dursac and Bogát defeats an army of insurgents, who plans to overthrow their ally, Emperor Berengar I, at Brescia.

====== Arabian Empire ======
- June 21 – A diplomatic delegation is sent from Baghdad to establish trade routes between the Abbasid Caliphate towards Bukhara (modern Uzbekistan). Ahmad ibn Fadlan, an Arab diplomat and traveller, makes contact with Almış, the İltäbär (vassal-king under the Khazars) of Volga Bulgaria, on behalf of Caliph al-Muqtadir.
- Battle of Sevan: Sajid forces under Yusuf Beshir invade Armenia and besiege King Ashot II near Lake Sevan. After gathering a small force he attacks Beshir's camps and drives the enemy out of the country. Ashot starts a counter-offensive to rebuild the ruined cities and fortresses.

====== Africa ======
- The Fatimid Caliphate crushes Idrisid forces in battle, capturing the cities of Tlemcen and Fez.
- The Fatimid Caliphate creates a new capital in Ifriqiya, al-Mahdiya on the Tunisian coast.

====== China ======
- The Later Liang Dynasty reports that all "barbarian" tribes have been pacified by the Khitan Empire.

=== 922 ===
==== By place ====
====== Byzantine Empire ======
- Summer – Battle of Constantinople: Emperor Romanos I sends Byzantine troops to repel another Bulgarian raid at the outskirts of Constantinople. The Byzantines storm the Bulgarian camp, but are defeated when they are confronted by the main Bulgarian forces. Having won the battle, the Bulgarians lack the maritime power to conduct a successful siege of Constantinople.

====== Europe ======
- Summer – The West Frankish nobles revolt and depose King Charles III (the Simple) after a 24-year reign. He seeks refuge in Lotharingia and is replaced by Robert I, a brother of the late King Odo, who is crowned king of the West Frankish Kingdom in the cathedral at Rheims.
- Adalbert I, margrave of Ivrea, leads a rebellion with the support of the Italian nobles against King Berengar I. He crosses the Alps into Burgundy and invites Rudolph II of Upper Burgundy to invade Italy. Berengar flees again to Verona and Rudolph is crowned King of Italy at Pavia.

==== By topic ====
====== Religion ======
- March 26 – Mansur al-Hallaj, a Persian mystic writer, is sentenced to death for heresy after a long trial at Baghdad. Having supported reform in the Abbasid Caliphate, he has been seen as a rabble-rouser, and is flogged, mutilated and executed (by beheading).

=== 923 ===
==== By place ====
====== Europe ======
- June 15 – Battle of Soissons: King Robert I is killed; the Frankish army, led by Charles the Simple, is defeated and routed near Soissons. Charles is captured and imprisoned at Péronne. The nobles elect Robert's son-in-law Rudolph, duke of Burgundy, as king of the West Frankish Kingdom (until 936).
- July 29 – Battle of Fiorenzuola: Lombard forces led by King Rudolph II and Adalbert I, margrave of Ivrea, defeat the deposed Emperor Berengar I at Firenzuola (Tuscany). A pact is reached between Rudolph and Berengar, who abdicates the imperial throne and cedes sovereignty over the rest of Italy.

====== Asia ======
- May 13 – The Later Liang, one of the Five Dynasties in China, falls to Later Tang (founded by Li Cunxu). Li proclaims himself emperor and moves his residence back to the old Tang capital of Luoyang.
- August 11 – The Qarmatians of Bahrayn capture and pillage the city of Basra.

=== 924 ===
==== January—March ====
- January 5 – The monastery of San Martín de Albelda is founded in the Kingdom of Navarre in what is now the city of Albelda de Iregua in Spain, by orders of King Sancho Garcés I and Toda Aznárez, monarchs of Navarre, to celebrate the previous year's recapture of the cities of Nájera and Viguera.
- January 20 – China's Emperor Zhuangzong reverses an initial decision to spare the life of General Li Jitao after discovering that Li is continuing to plot the overthrow of the government, and has Li executed.
- February 12 – (1 Dhu al-Qi'dah 311 A.H.) Ahmad ibn Kayghalagh is removed from office as the Abbasid Governor of Egypt by the Caliph al-Muqtadir after less than six months in office and is replaced by Takin al-Khazari. who, following his death, sack and burn the city of Pavia. They Hungarian forces penetrate as far as the Pyrenees.
- March 24 – Hungarian Magyar forces led by General Szalárd, capture Pavia, capital of the Kingdom of Italy within the Holy Roman Empire, at the request of the Holy Roman Emperor Berengar. Later, after crossing the Alps via the St. Bernard Pass, the Magyars pillage Provence, Septimania and Nismes in southern France).
- March – A group of 1,800 warriors of the Qarmatians of Bahrayn attack and destroy the returning Hajj caravans at al-Habir. Some of the more prominent pilgrims, who were returning to Baghdad from Mecca, are taken to Al-Ahsa Oasis to be held for ransom. The event leads to the downfall and execution of the Abbasid Caliphate's vizier, Ibn al-Furat.

==== April—June ====
- April 7 – After having made a new alliance with the Hungarians, the Holy Roman Emperor Berengar I, King of Italy, is assassinated in Verona by one of his guards. Rudolph II, King of Burgundy and a claimant to the throne, takes full control of the Kingdom of Italy, while the office of the Holy Roman Emperor will not be re-created until 38 years later.
- June 15 – Abu'l-Hasan Ali ibn al-Furat, the Grand Vizier of the Abbasid Caliph al-Muqtadir since returning to power in August 923, is removed from office by the Caliph,and is replaced by Abdallah ibn Muhammad al-Khaqani. On July 24, he is executed along with his son, al-Muhassin, for his brutality during his rule and for failing to prevent the March attack by the Qarmatians on Iraqi Muslim pilgrims.
- June – Fruela II, King of Asturias in what is now Portugal, becomes the new ruler of the Kingdom of León and the Kingdom of Galicia in Spain upon the death of his younger brother, King Ordoño II, who dies after a 14-year reign. The ascent of Fruela reunites Asturias, Galicia and Leon. Fruela, who is not popular with the nobles, orders the assassination of the sons of Olmundo.

==== July—September ====
- July 17 – Edward the Elder, King of the Anglo-Saxons, is killed in battle at Farndon-Upon-Dee while leading an army against a revolt by some of the Cambrians and Mercians. During his 25-year reign, he gained direct control over Mercia, including some of the Danelaw, the Danish-occupied areas. Edward's oldest son, Æthelstan, is proclaimed the new King of England, while some supporters among the West Saxons support Ælfweard, to be Edward's successor as King of Wessex.
- August 2 – Ælfweard of Wessex, briefly a claimant for the throne of England and favored by the nobility of Wessex,dies at the age of 23 only sixteen days after the death of his father.
- August – In what is now South Korea, at Seorabeo (now Gyeongju in South Korea), Gyeongae becomes the new monarch of the Kingdom of Silla upon the death of his older brother, King Gyeongmyeong.
- September 7 – Byzantine–Bulgarian War: Tsar Simeon I, ruler (knyaz) of the Bulgarian Empire, leads the burning of the Church of St. Mary of the Spring in Constantinople.
- September 9 – After pllaging the suburbs of Constantinople, Tsar Simeon I of Bulgaria meets with the Byzantine Emperor Romanos I Lekapenos on the Golden Horn to arrange a truce, according to which Byzantium will pay the Bulgarians an annual tribute in exchangefor the return of some cities on the Black Sea coast.

==== October—December ====
- November 9 – Byzantine co-Emperor Romanos I Lekapenos concludes a treaty with the Tsar Simeon I of Bulgaria and provides the Bulgarian monarch with "gold and silver shields and lances."
- November – (Shaban 312 AH) Hamd bin Khazar, leader of the Zenata Berber nomads in the high plateau of central Algeria, sets an ambush that kills Massala ibn Habus, the Fatimid Governor of Tahert.
- December 25 – Stephen Lekapenos and Constantine Lekapenos are promoted to the position of co-Emperors of Byzantium, joining Constantine VII, Romanos I and Christopher, creating a pentarchy with five monarchs.

==== By place ====
====== Europe ======
- Fall – Bulgarian–Serbian War: Tsar Simeon I sends a punitive expedition force against Serbia, led by Theodore Sigritsa and Marmais, but they are ambushed and defeated. Zaharija, prince of the Serbs, sends their heads and armour later to Constantinople (approximate date).
- Winter – The Hungarians invade Saxony and force King Henry I (the Fowler) to retreat into the Castle of Werla. He makes a pact and agrees to pay them tribute for 9 years. They return to the Po Valley and sack the cities of Bergamo, Brescia and Mantua (Northern Italy).

====== Asia ======
- Emperor Taizu of the Liao Dynasty leads a campaign to the West. He reaches the former capital of the Uyghur Kingdom on the Orkhon River. The Zubu begin to pay tribute to the Khitan Empire.
- Emperor Zhuang Zong of Later Tang bestows the chancellor title on Gao Jixing (Prince of Nanping) and creates the Nanping State (Central China). The Qi State falls to Later Tang.

=== 925 ===
==== By date ====
====== January – June ======
- January 5 – Gabellus becomes the first abbot of the monsastery of San Martín de Albelda in the Spanish kingdom of Navarre.
- January – Hashim ibn Muhammad becomes the new ruler of the Banu Tujib, an Arab state in Spain, upon the death of his father, Muhammad al-Anqar al-Tujibi.
- May 15 – Nicholas I Mystikos, twice the Ecumenical Patriarch of Constantinople and having reigned a second time since 912, dies at the age of 73.
- May 23 – At Luoyang, Zhao Guangyin, the Grand Chancellor (equivalent to a Prime Minister) of the Emperor Li Cunxu of Later Tang dynasty China, dies. Zhao's duties are assumed by Li Cunxu's son, Prince Li Siyuan.
- June 29 — Stephen II becomes the new Ecumenical Patriarch of Constantinople and head of the Eastern Orthodox Church, succeeding Nicholas I.

====== July – December ======
- July 4 — At the age of 12, Shabbethai Donnolo, who will become one of the most prominent physicians in Italy and the doctor to the Byzantine court, is kidnapped by Arab slavers as a Fatimid expeditionary force, led by Jafar ibn Obeid, lands in Abruzzo in southern Italy and overruns Apulia and the city of Otranto. After defeating the Byzantine garrisons, the Arabs lay siege to the castle of Oria and destroy it, killing the defenders and taking the women and children as slaves back to North Africa. Donnolo's family pays a ransom and the Fatimid Amir Abu Ahmad Ja'far ibn 'Ubaid sets him free.
- August — In Spain, Fruela II, King of León and King of Galicia, dies and is temporarily succeded by his son, Alfonso Fróilaz.
- September 4 — The coronation of Æthelstan as King of the Anglo-Saxons (comprising the united kingdoms of Wessex and Mercia) takes place on the island of Britain at Kingston upon Thames.
- September — The Chamberlain Ja'far ibn Ubayd of the Fatimid Caliphate returns to the Fatimid capital of Mahdiya (now in Tunisia) after a successful 17-month campaign to pillage the Byzantine-ruled island of Sicily.
- October — In Byzantium, John Mystikos, chief minister (paradynasteuon), is deposed by the Emperor Romanos I, flogged, and sent into exile in a monastery. He is replaced by the chamberlain (protovestiarios) Theophanes, who becomes the closest adviser of Emperor Romanos I. At this time the Byzantine Empire has been embroiled in a protracted and disastrous war with Tsar Simeon I of Bulgaria.
- November — In Baghdad (now in Iraq),Abdallah ibn Muhammad al-Khaqani is dismissed from his position as the Grand Vizier of the Abbasid Caliphate upon the insistence of the Abassid commander Mu'nis al-Muzaffar.
- December 10 — In Pamplona in Spain, Jimeno II becomes the new King of Navarre in Spain upon the death of his brother, King Sancho I.
- December 15 — At Chengdu, capital of the Former Shu dynasty state in China, the Later Tang dynasty generals Li Jiji and Guo Chongtao acccept the surrender of the surviving Shu official, Li Yan, representative of the Shu Emperor Wang Zongyan.
- December 28 — In China, Guo Chongtao, military commander of the Later Tang dynasty that rules from what is now the Henan province, has his deputy commanders Wang Zongbi, Wang Zongxun and Wang Zongwo arreted and executed on accusations of disloyalty, after receiving permission from Prince Li Jiji, 13 days after their victory over the Former Shu kingdom.
- December 30 — Wang Shenzhi, the Chinese ruler of the Min Kingdom (now part of the Fujian province, with a capital of Fuzhou), dies after a long illness and is succeeded by his eldest son, Wang Yanhan.

==== By place ====
====== Europe ======
- Summer – King Fruela II dies after a reign of only 14 months. He is succeeded by his son Alfonso Fróilaz who ascends the throne. With the support of King Jimeno II of Pamplona (later Navarra), Sancho Ordóñez, Alfonso, and Ramiro (the sons of the late King Ordoño II) revolt and drive their cousin Alfonso to the eastern marches of Asturias, then divide the kingdom amongst themselves. Alfonso IV ("the Monk") receives the crown of León, and Sancho I is acclaimed king of Galicia.
- Alberic I, duke of Spoleto, attempts to seize Rome on his own account. Pope John X organizes an uprising and expels him. Alberic flees to Orte, where he sends out messengers calling on the Magyars for assistance. But a mob in Orte, informed by papal agents, rises up and murders Alberic (approximate date).
- King Rudolph II of Burgundy (who also rules Italy) and his father-in-law, Burchard II of Swabia, lead a Burgundian expeditionary force over the Great St. Bernard Pass to confront Hugh of Provence. They head to the city of Ivrea where Rudolph's forces begin a civil war against Lombard partisans.
- Tomislav, duke of the Croatian duchies of Pannonia and Dalmatia, is crowned as king of Croatia. He forges an alliance with the Byzantines during the struggle with the Bulgarian Empire (approximate date).

====== Asia ======
- Winter – Former Shu, one of the Ten Kingdoms in China, is invaded by Later Tang forces of Emperor Zhuang Zong, who incorporates the kingdom into his domains.
- A visiting Uyghur delegation spurs the development of Khitan small script, based on alphabetic principles (approximate date).

==== By topic ====
====== Religion ======
- Ha-Mim proclaims himself a prophet and a messenger of Islam, among the Ghomara Berbers near the city of Tétouan (modern Morocco).

=== 926 ===
==== By place ====
====== Europe ======
- Spring – The Italian nobles turn against King Rudolph II of Burgundy and request that Hugh of Provence, the effective ruler of Lower Burgundy, be elected as king of Italy. Rudolph's father-in-law Duke Burchard II of Swabia is ambushed and killed near Novara, by the henchmen of Archbishop Lambert of Milan. Rudolph, disillusioned by the news, returns to Burgundy to protect himself. Hugh has himself crowned King of Italy. and appoints Giselbert I as count palatine of Bergamo (Northern Italy).
- Battle of the Bosnian Highlands: Bulgarian forces under Duke Alogobotur are ambushed and defeated by a Croatian army of King Tomislav, in the mountainous area of Eastern Bosnia. Tsar Simeon I meets his first defeat against Croatia, but overruns the Western Balkans several times.
- The Hungarians besiege Augsburg in Bavaria, then conquer the monastery of St. Gallen (modern Switzerland). After an unsuccessful battle with the locals, they burn the suburbs of Konstanz, then they cross westwards and defeat a Frankish army led by Duke Liutfred of Alsace.

====== Britain ======
- King Æthelstan of Wessex and Mercia annexes Northumbria, and forces Wales and Strathclyde to accept his sovereignty along with the Picts and the Scots (approximate date).

====== Asia ======
- May 15 – Emperor Zhuang Zong is killed during an officer's rebellion led by Guo Congqian at the old Tang capital of Luoyang. He is succeeded by his adoptive brother Li Siyuan (Ming Zong) as ruler of Later Tang. Li sends Yao Kun, as an emissary, to create a friendly relationship with the Khitan Empire.
- September 6 – Emperor Taizu dies after a 10-year reign. He is succeeded by his second son Tai Zong (Yaogu) as ruler of the Chinese Liao Dynasty. Taizu's eldest son Yelü Bei (designated heir apparent) becomes ruler of the Dongdan Kingdom (former Balhae), a puppet state of the Khitan Empire.

==== By topic ====
====== Religion ======
- Pope John X allies himself with Hugh of Provence provoking the ire of Marozia, daughter of the Roman consul Theophylact I, who is married to Hugh's rival Guy of Tuscany.

=== 927 ===
==== By place ====
====== Europe ======
- May 27 – Simeon I, emperor (tsar) of the Bulgarian Empire, dies of heart failure in his palace at Preslav after a 34-year reign. He is survived by four sons and succeeded by his second son Peter I, who signs a peace treaty with the Byzantine Empire. The peace is confirmed by Peter's marrying Maria Lekapene (the daughter of Christopher Lekapenos, son and co-emperor of Romanos I). The treaty restores the borders to those established by several treaties (thus recognizing Bulgaria's possession of Macedonia).
- July 12 – King Æthelstan of Wessex claims his kingdom and receives the submission of High-Reeve Ealdred I of Bamburgh and probably also of Owain ap Dyfnwal, King of Strathclyde, at Eamont Bridge. He unifies the various small kingdoms of the Anglo-Saxon Heptarchy, creating the Kingdom of England, and also secures a pledge from King Constantine II of Scotland, that he will not ally with the Viking kings. This summer also Kings Hywel Dda of Deheubarth and Owain of Glywysing and Gwent submit to the overlordship of Æthelstan at Hereford. The borders between England and Wales are set at the River Wye.
- Summer – The Hungarians fight in Rome, helping Margrave Peter against Pope John X. They then go to southern Italy, and conquer the cities of Taranto and Oria.
- August 15 – Led by the Slavic Sabir, the Fatimids from Sicily, capture and destroy Taranto. They enslave much of the population.

====== Asia ======
- Later Baekje, one of the Later Three Kingdoms of Korea, sacks the Silla capital at Gyeongju. King Gyeongae commits suicide and Gyeongsun is placed on the throne by the Later Baekje king Kyŏn Hwŏn.
- October/November – The Qarmatian invasion of Iraq begins.
- 7 December – The Sajid emir of Adharbayjan, Yusuf ibn Abi'l-Saj is defeated and captured by the Qarmatians near Kufa.

==== By topic ====
====== Religion ======
- The Bulgarian Orthodox Church is recognised as autocephalous, by the Patriarchate of Constantinople.
- September 14 – Cele Dabhaill mac Scannal, Irish preacher and abbot, dies on his pilgrimage at Rome.

=== 928 ===
==== By place ====
====== Europe ======
- King Rudolph I loses the support of Herbert II, count of Vermandois, who controls the prison at Péronne in which former King Charles III (the Simple) is imprisoned. Herbert brings him before William I (Longsword), count of Rouen, for homage and then to Rheims as leverage to blackmail Rudolph to make him cede sovereignty over Laon (Northern France).
- June 5 – Louis III (the Blind), former king of Provence (Lower Burgundy), dies at Arles after a 27-year reign (of which 23 are sightless). He is succeeded by his brother-in-law Hugh I who is King of Italy. With the approval of his kinsman Rudolph I, Hugh strips Louis's son and heir, Charles Constantine, of his inheritance and proclaims himself as ruler of Provence.
- Winter – King Henry I (the Fowler) subdues the Polabian Slavs who live on the eastern borders. He then marches against the Slavic Hevelli tribes and seizes their capital, Brandenburg. Henry invades the Glomacze lands in the middle Elbe valley, where he besieges and destroys the main castle called Gana (the later Albrechtsburg) at Meissen (Saxony).

====== Britain ======
- King Hywel Dda (the Good) of Deheubarth makes a pilgrimage to Rome, he becomes the first Welsh ruler to undertake such a trip. Hywel begins the codification of medieval Welsh law and mints his own coinage.

====== Italy ======
- Summer – A Fatimid fleet under Sabir al-Fata raids Byzantine southern Italy. It captures a locality named al-Ghiran ('the caves') in Apulia and sacks the cities of Taranto and Otranto. The inhabitants are carried off to North Africa as slaves.

====== Asia ======
- Ishanavarman II dies after a 5-year reign and is succeeded by his uncle Jayavarman IV as king of the Khmer Empire (modern Cambodia). He moves the capital north from Angkor to Koh Ker.

==== By topic ====
====== Religion ======
- Summer – Pope John X is deposed and imprisoned in Castel Sant'Angelo at Rome by order of the Roman senatrix Marozia after a 14-year reign. He is succeeded by Leo VI as the 123rd pope of the Catholic Church.
- Leo VI abolishes the Nin Bishopric and transfers bishop Gregory (Croatian: Grgur Ninski) to Skradin. This ends the long running dispute between the Split and Nin Bishoprics in the Croatian kingdom.
- July 18 – Tryphon succeeds Stephen II as patriarch of Constantinople (until 931).

=== 929 ===
==== By place ====
====== Europe ======
- January 16 – Emir Abd al-Rahman III of Córdoba, Spain, proclaims himself caliph and creates the Caliphate of Córdoba. He breaks his allegiance to, and ties with, the Fatimid and Abbasid caliphs.
- February 3 – Guy, Margrave of Tuscany, second husband (third lover) of the Roman noblewoman Marozia, dies. He is succeeded by his brother Lambert as margrave of Tuscany.
- Early 929 – Siege of Gana: German king Henry the Fowler besieges Gana with an East Frankish army and conquers the stronghold. He establishes the fort of Meissen nearby.
- Early 929 – Henry the Fowler invades Bohemia from the north and marches on Prague. Duke Arnulf I of Bavaria invades Bohemia from the south. The Bohemians capitulate.
- Summer – The Slavic-Arab leader Sabir defeats a small Byzantine fleet and seizes Termoli (in Molise, on the Adriatic coast). He returns to Africa laden with booty and slaves.
- September 4 – Battle of Lenzen: Slavic forces (the Redarii and the Obotrites) are defeated by a Saxon army near the fortified stronghold of Lenzen (modern Germany).
- October 7 – Charles the Simple, former king of West Francia, dies in prison at Péronne, leaving Rudolph with no opposition except that of Herbert II, Count of Vermandois.

====== Asia ======
- Mpu Sindok, ruler of the Mataram Kingdom, moves his court from Central to East Java (modern Indonesia), probably after the eruption of Mount Merapi and/or invasion from Srivijaya.

==== By topic ====
====== Religion ======
- Pope Leo VI dies at Rome after a 7-month reign. He is succeeded (probably handpicked–by Marozia from the Tusculani family) by Stephen VII as the 124th pope of the Catholic Church.

== Significant people ==
- Al-Ash'ari
- Al-Muqtadir Abbasid caliph
- Constantine VII Byzantine emperor

== Births ==
920

- Adso of Montier-en-Der, Frankish Benedictine abbot (d. 992)
- Athanasius the Athonite, Byzantine monk (approximate date)
- Dunash ben Labrat, Spanish Jewish commentator (d. 990)
- Fujiwara no Morotada, Japanese statesman (d. 969)
- Gao Baorong, king of Nanping (Ten Kingdoms) (d. 960)
- Goltregoda, Frankish countess and regent (d. 963)
- Guntram the Rich, founder of the House of Habsburg (d. 973)
- Haakon I, king of Norway (approximate date)
- Hugh of Vermandois, Frankish archbishop (d. 962)
- Li Jingsui, prince of Southern Tang (d. 958)
- Liu Bin, emperor of Southern Han (d. 943)
- Liu Sheng, emperor of Southern Han (d. 958)
- Liutprand of Cremona, Lombard bishop (d. 972)
- Louis IV, king of the West Frankish Kingdom (or 921)
- Megingoz, count of Guelders (approximate date)
- Menahem ben Saruq, Spanish Jewish philologist (d. 970)
- Minamoto no Masanobu, Japanese nobleman (d. 993)
- Miró III, count of Cerdanya and Besalú (d. 984)
- Oliba Cabreta, Frankish nobleman (approximate date)
- Ratna Pala, king of Kamarupa (India) (d. 960)
- Reginar III, Frankish nobleman (approximate date)
- Rogvolod, prince of Polotsk (approximate date)

921

- February 21 – Abe no Seimei, Japanese astrologer (d. 1005)
- October 9 – Li Chun'an, Chinese merchant (d. 999)
- October 27 – Chai Rong, emperor of Later Zhou (d. 959)
- Edmund I (the Magnificent), king of England (d. 946)
- Ja'far ibn al-Furat, Ikhshidid and Fatimid vizier (d. 1001)
- Louis IV, king of the West Frankish Kingdom (or 920)
- Ōnakatomi no Yoshinobu, Japanese nobleman (d. 991)

922

- Hedwig of Nordgau, countess of Luxemburg (approximate date)
- Ibn Abi Zayd, Muslim imam and scholar (d. 996)
- Ki no Tokibumi, Japanese nobleman and waka poet (d. 996)
- Sigfried, founder of Luxemburg (approximate date)
- Wang Pu, Chinese chancellor and writer (d. 982)

923

- September 7 – Suzaku, emperor of Japan (d. 952)
- Abū Hayyān al-Tawhīdī, Muslim intellectual (d. 1023)
- Al-Shaykh al-Saduq, Muslim scholar (approximate date)
- Eadred (or Edred), king of England (d. 955)
- Fujiwara no Nakafumi, Japanese waka poet (d. 992)
- Jeongjong, king of Goryeo (Korea) (d. 949)
- Liu Honggao, Chinese chancellor (d. 943)

924

- Fujiwara no Koretada, Japanese statesman and waka poet (d. 972)
- Fujiwara no Yoritada, Japanese nobleman and regent (d. 989)
- Gao Baoxu, king of Nanping (Ten Kingdoms) (d. 962)
- Li Jingda, prince of Southern Tang (d. 971)
- Nyaung-u Sawrahan, king of the Pagan dynasty (d. 1001)
- Đinh Bộ Lĩnh, Emperor of Viet Nam (d.979)

925

- May – Bruno I, archbishop and duke of Lotharingia (d. 965)
- Basil Lekapenos, Byzantine chief minister (d. 985) (approximate date)
- Conrad I, king of Burgundy (approximate date)
- Fujiwara no Kanemichi, Japanese statesman (d. 977)
- Gerberga, Frankish noblewoman (approximate date)
- Gwangjong (personal name: Wang So), king of Goryeo (d. 975)
- John I Tzimiskes, Byzantine emperor (approximate date)
- Judith, duchess regent of Bavaria (d. 985)
- Li Fang, Chinese scholar and official (d. 996)
- Pan Mei, general of the Song dynasty (d. 991) (approximate date)
- Qian Hongzun, heir apparent of Wuyue (d. 940)
- Thietmar, Margrave of Meissen (approximate date)
- Widukind of Corvey, Saxon chronicler (approximate date)

926

- July 14 – Murakami, emperor of Japan (d. 967)
- Gao Huaide, Chinese general (approximate date)
- Liu Jun, emperor of Northern Han (d. 968)
- Ordoño III, king of León (approximate date)
- Ordoño IV, king of León (approximate date)
- Phạm Thị Trân, Vietnamese opera singer and Mandarin (d. 976)

927

- March 21 – Taizu, emperor of the Song dynasty (d. 976)
- Amlaíb Cuarán, Viking king of Scandinavian York (d. 981)
- Ch'oe Sung-no, Korean politician and poet (d. 989)
- Fantinus, Italian hermit and abbot (approximate date)
- Fujiwara no Anshi, empress consort of Japan (d. 964)

928

- August 14 – Qian Hongzuo, king of Wuyue (d. 947)
- Dub mac Maíl Coluīm, king of Scotland (d. 967)
- Pietro I Orseolo, doge of Venice (d. 987)
- Qian Hongzong, king of Wuyue (d. 971)
- Shi Shouxin, Chinese general (d. 984)

929

- September 29 – Qian Chu, king of Wuyue (d. 988)
- al-Ta'i', Abbasid caliph of Baghdad (d. 1003)
- Fujiwara no Kaneie, Japanese statesman (d. 990)
- Guo Zhongshu, Chinese painter (approximate date)
- Saigū no Nyōgo (Princess Kishi), Japanese waka poet (d. 985)
- William, archbishop of Mainz (d. 968)

== Deaths ==
920

- Abd-Allah Mikali, Abbasid governor
- Abu Sa'id al-Janadi, Arab scholar
- Æthelweard, son of Alfred the Great (or 922)
- Ahmad ibn Sahl, Samanid governor
- Brahma Pala, king of Kamarupa
- Georgios I, ruler of Makuria (Egypt)
- Harumichi no Tsuraki, Japanese poet
- Mael Macduach, king of Hy Fiachrach (Ireland)
- Raymond I, count of Pallars and Ribagorza (Spain)
- Stephen of Liège, Frankish bishop
- Yang Longyan, king of Wu (b. 897)

921

- February 13 – Vratislaus I, duke of Bohemia
- September 15 – Ludmila, Bohemian duchess
- Alexios Mosele, Byzantine admiral
- Elvira Menéndez, queen of Galicia and León
- Harusindan, ruler of the Gilites (Iran)
- Lili ibn al-Nu'man, ruler of the Gilites
- Liu Xun, general of Later Liang (b. 858)
- Ragnall ua Ímair, Viking king of Northumbria
- Richard, duke of Burgundy (b. 858)
- Wang Rong, Chinese warlord (b. 877)

922

- February 20 – Theodora, Byzantine empress
- March 26 – Mansur al-Hallaj, Persian mystic writer
- May 23 – Li Sizhao, Chinese general and governor
- Æthelweard, son of Alfred the Great of England (or 920)
- Al-Nayrizi, Persian mathematician and astronomer (b. 865)
- Fortún Garcés ("the Monk"), king of Pamplona
- Galindo II Aznárez, count of Aragon (Spain)
- Li Cunjin, general of the Tang dynasty (b. 857)
- Li Cunzhang, general of the Tang dynasty
- Lucídio Vimaranes, count of Portugal
- Ma Chuo, general and official of Wuyue (or 923)
- Wang Chuzhi, Chinese warlord (b. 862)
- Zhang Chengye, Chinese eunuch official (b. 846)
- Zhang Chujin, Chinese governor (jiedushi)

923

- June 15 – Robert I, king of the West Frankish Kingdom (b. 860)
- August 2 – Plegmund, archbishop of Canterbury (or 914)
- August 27 – Ageltrude, queen of Italy and Holy Roman Empress
- October 8 – Pilgrim I, archbishop of Salzburg
- November 20
  - Jing Xiang, Chinese strategist
  - Li Zhen, official of Later Liang
- Abu Bakr al-Khallal, Muslim scholar and jurist (b. 848)
- Adarnase IV, prince of Iberia/Kartli (Georgia)
- Badr al-Hammami (the Elder), Abbasid general
- Gurgen I, prince of Tao-Klarjeti (Georgia)
- Harshavarman I, king of Angkor (Cambodia)
- Ibn Khuzaymah, Muslim hadith and scholar (b. 837)
- Ma Chuo, general and official of Wuyue (or 922)
- Muhammad ibn Jarir al-Tabari, Persian scholar (b. 839)
- Reccared, Galician clergyman (b. 885)
- Ricwin (or Ricuin), Frankish nobleman
- Walter (or Vaulter), archbishop of Sens
- Wang Yanzhang, general of Later Liang (b. 863)
- Zhao Yan, military prefect and official of Later Liang
- Zhu Youzhen, emperor of Later Liang (b. 888)

924

- January 20 – Li Jitao, general of Later Tang
- April 7 – Berengar I, king of Italy and Holy Roman Emperor
- April 11 – Herman I, archbishop of Cologne
- May 17 – Li Maozhen, Chinese warlord and king (b. 856)
- June 16 – Li Cunshen, general of Later Tang (b. 862)
- July 17 – Edward the Elder, king of Wessex
- July 18 – Abu'l-Hasan Ali ibn al-Furat, Abbasid vizier (b. 855)
- August 2 – Ælfweard, son of Edward the Elder
- Damian of Tarsus, Muslim governor
- Gyeongmyeong, king of Silla (Korea)
- Marmais, Bulgarian nobleman
- Ordoño II, king of Galicia and León
- Raymond II, Frankish nobleman
- Theodore Sigritsa, Bulgarian minister
- Yuan Xiangxian, Chinese general
- Zaharija, prince of Serbia (approximate date)

925

- March – Bertha, duchess regent of Lucca and Tuscany (b. 863)
- May 15 – Nicholas I Mystikos, Byzantine patriarch (b. 852)
- May 23 – Zhao Guangyin, chancellor of Later Tang
- July – Fruela II, king of Asturias and León
- August 3 – Cao, Chinese empress dowager
- December 10 – Sancho I, king of Pamplona
- December 28 – Wang Zongbi, general of Former Shu
- December 30 – Wang Shenzhi, founder of Min (b. 862)
- Alberic I, duke of Spoleto (approximate date)
- Cathal mac Conchobair, king of Connacht
- Abu Bakr al-Razi, Persian philosopher (approximate date)
- Sueiro Belfaguer, Portuguese nobleman (b. 875)

926

- January 8 – Athelm, archbishop of Canterbury
- March 9 – Zhu Youqian, Chinese warlord
- April 29 – Burchard II, duke of Swabia
- May 15 – Zhuang Zong, emperor of Later Tang (b. 885)
- May 26 – Yuan Xingqin, Chinese general
- May 28
  - Kong Qian, official of Later Tang
  - Li Jiji, prince of Later Tang
- September 6 – Abaoji (Taizu), emperor of the Khitan Empire
- December 12, William II, duke of Aquitaine
- Abdallah ibn Muhammad al-Khaqani, Abbasid vizier (or 927)
- Alogobotur, Bulgarian nobleman (approximate date)
- Ero Fernández, Galician magnate (approximate date)
- Guo Chongtao, general of Later Tang
- Jin Feishan, empress of Former Shu
- Kang Yanxiao, Chinese general
- Liu, empress and wife of Zhuang Zong
- Pelagius of Córdoba, Christian martyr
- Wang Zongyan, emperor of Former Shu (b. 899)
- Wiborada, Swabian anchoress and martyr
- Xu, empress dowager of Former Shu
- Zhang Quanyi, Chinese warlord (b. 852)

927

- January 13 – Berno of Cluny, Frankish monk and abbot
- January 14 – Wang Yanhan, king of Min (Ten Kingdoms)
- May 27 – Simeon I, emperor (tsar) of the Bulgarian Empire
- August 24
  - Doulu Ge, chancellor of Later Tang
  - Wei Yue, chancellor of Later Tang
- September 14 – Cele Dabhaill mac Scannal, Irish abbot
- November 7 – Zhu Shouyin, general of Later Tang
- November 20 – Xu Wen, general and regent of Wu (b. 862)
- Abdallah ibn Muhammad, Abbasid vizier (or 926)
- Shahid Balkhi, Persian philosopher and poet
- Gyeongae, king (55th ruler) of Silla (Korea)
- Ha-Mim, Moroccan prophet and messenger of Islam
- Ibn al-Dahhak, Kurdish chieftain (approximate date)
- Miró II, count of Cerdanya and Besalú (Spain)
- Ren Huan, general and chancellor of Later Tang
- Sin Sung-gyom, Korean general (Three Kingdoms)
- Sigtrygg Cáech, Viking king of Scandinavian York
- Zhang Ge, politician and chancellor of Former Shu

928

- January 20 – Zhao Guangfeng, Chinese official and chancellor
- June 5 – Louis the Blind, Frankish king and Holy Roman Emperor
- July 18 – Stephen II, patriarch of Constantinople
- November 8 – Duan Ning, Chinese general
- Al-Layth ibn Ali ibn al-Layth, Saffarid emir
- Diogo Fernandes, count of Portugal
- Huo Yanwei, Chinese general (b. 872)
- Ishanavarman II, king of the Khmer Empire
- John X, pope of the Catholic Church
- Siyahchashm, Justanid ruler (mahdi)
- Tomislav, duke and king of Croatia
- Wang, empress dowager of Wu
- Yusuf ibn Abi'l-Saj, Sajid emir
- Zhang Juhan, Chinese official (b. 858)

929

- January 28 – Gao Jixing, founder of Chinese Jingnan (b. 858)
- February 3 – Guy ("the Philosopher"), margrave of Tuscany (Italy)
- February 12 – Leo VI, pope of the Catholic Church
- March 26 – Wang Du, Chinese warlord and governor (jiedushi)
- April 9 – Cui Xie, Chinese official and chancellor
- June 7 – Ælthryth, English princess and countess of Flanders (b. 877)
- Before August 16 – Sancho Ordóñez, king of Galicia (Spain)
- October 7 – Charles the Simple, Frankish king (b. 879)
- Abu Ali al-Husayn ibn Ahmad al-Madhara'i, Abbasid fiscal director
- Abu'l-Musafir al-Fath, Sajid emir of Azerbaijan (Iran)
- Al-Batani, Muslim astronomer and mathematician
- Ashot II, king of Armenia (approximate date)
- Gao Yu, Chinese chief strategist
- Indra III, ruler of Rashtrakuta (India)
- Lothar I, Frankish nobleman (b. 902)
- Lothar II, Frankish nobleman (b. 874)
- Padla II, prince of Kakheti (Georgia)
- Thumal the Qahraman, Abbasid female judge
- Zhao Jingyi, Chinese general and governor
