= 927 =

Calendar year

927 in various calendars
- Gregorian calendar: 927; CMXXVII
- Ab urbe condita: 1680
- Armenian calendar: 376; ԹՎ ՅՀԶ
- Assyrian calendar: 5677
- Balinese saka calendar: 848–849
- Bengali calendar: 333–334
- Berber calendar: 1877
- Buddhist calendar: 1471
- Burmese calendar: 289
- Byzantine calendar: 6435–6436
- Chinese calendar: 丙戌年 (Fire Dog); 3624 or 3417 — to — 丁亥年 (Fire Pig); 3625 or 3418
- Coptic calendar: 643–644
- Discordian calendar: 2093
- Ethiopian calendar: 919–920
- Hebrew calendar: 4687–4688
- Hindu calendars
- Vikram Samvat: 983–984
- Shaka Samvat: 848–849
- Kali Yuga: 4027–4028
- Holocene calendar: 10927
- Iranian calendar: 305–306
- Islamic calendar: 314–315
- Japanese calendar: Enchō 5 (延長５年)
- Javanese calendar: 826–827
- Julian calendar: 927; CMXXVII
- Korean calendar: 3260
- Minguo calendar: 985 before ROC 民前985年
- Nanakshahi calendar: −541
- Seleucid era: 1238/1239 AG
- Thai solar calendar: 1469–1470
- Tibetan calendar: མེ་ཕོ་ཁྱི་ལོ་ (male Fire-Dog); 1053 or 672 or −100 — to — མེ་མོ་ཕག་ལོ་ (female Fire-Boar); 1054 or 673 or −99

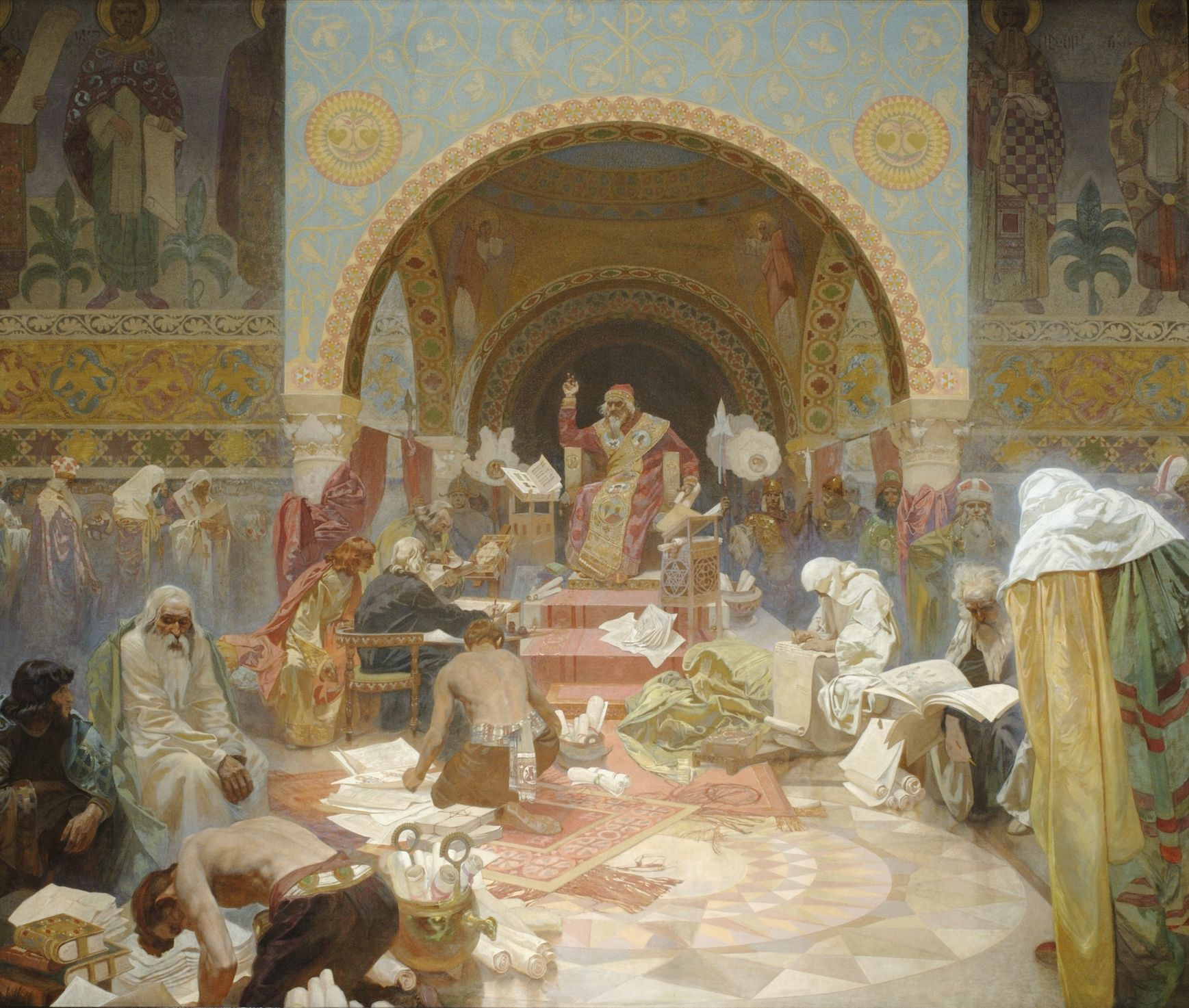
Tsar Simeon I of Bulgaria on his throne.

Year 927 (CMXXVII) was a common year starting on Monday of the Julian calendar.

== Events ==
=== By place ===
==== Europe ====
Map of the British Isles in the early tenth century

- May 27 – Simeon I, emperor (tsar) of the Bulgarian Empire, dies of heart failure in his palace at Preslav after a 34-year reign. He is survived by four sons and succeeded by his second son Peter I, who signs a peace treaty with the Byzantine Empire. The peace is confirmed by Peter's marrying Maria Lekapene (the daughter of Christopher Lekapenos, son and co-emperor of Romanos I). The treaty restores the borders to those established by several treaties (thus recognizing Bulgaria's possession of Macedonia).
- July 12 – King Æthelstan of Wessex receives the submission of High-Reeve Ealdred I of Bamburgh and probably also of Owain ap Dyfnwal, King of Strathclyde, at Eamont Bridge. He also secures a pledge from King Constantine II of Scotland, that he will not ally with the Viking kings. This summer also Kings Hywel Dda of Deheubarth and Owain of Glywysing and Gwent submit to the overlordship of Æthelstan at Hereford. The borders between England and Wales are set at the River Wye.
- Summer – The Hungarians fight in Rome, helping Margrave Peter against Pope John X. They then go to southern Italy, and conquer the cities of Taranto and Oria.
- August 15 – Led by the Slavic Sabir, the Fatimids from Sicily, capture and destroy Taranto. They enslave much of the population.
- October/November - Treaty of Constantinople. The Bulgarian Empire solidifies its status as a great power.

==== Asia ====
- Later Baekje, one of the Later Three Kingdoms of Korea, sacks the Silla capital at Gyeongju. King Gyeongae commits suicide and Gyeongsun is placed on the throne by the Later Baekje king Kyŏn Hwŏn.
- October/November – The Qarmatian invasion of Iraq begins.
- 7 December – The Sajid emir of Adharbayjan, Yusuf ibn Abi'l-Saj is defeated and captured by the Qarmatians near Kufa.

=== By topic ===
==== Religion ====
- The Bulgarian Orthodox Church is recognised as autocephalous, by the Patriarchate of Constantinople.
- September 14 – Cele Dabhaill mac Scannal, Irish preacher and abbot, dies on his pilgrimage at Rome.

== Births ==
- March 21 – Taizu, emperor of the Song dynasty (d. 976)
- Amlaíb Cuarán, Viking king of Scandinavian York (d. 981)
- Ch'oe Sung-no, Korean politician and poet (d. 989)
- Fantinus, Italian hermit and abbot (approximate date)
- Fujiwara no Anshi, empress consort of Japan (d. 964)

== Deaths ==
- January 13 – Berno of Cluny, Frankish monk and abbot
- January 14 – Wang Yanhan, king of Min (Ten Kingdoms)
- May 27 – Simeon I, emperor (tsar) of the Bulgarian Empire
- August 24
  - Doulu Ge, chancellor of Later Tang
  - Wei Yue, chancellor of Later Tang
- September 14 – Cele Dabhaill mac Scannal, Irish abbot
- November 7 – Zhu Shouyin, general of Later Tang
- November 20 – Xu Wen, general and regent of Wu (b. 862)
- Abdallah ibn Muhammad, Abbasid vizier (or 926)
- Shahid Balkhi, Persian philosopher and poet
- Gyeongae, king (55th ruler) of Silla (Korea)
- Ha-Mim, Moroccan prophet and messenger of Islam
- Ibn al-Dahhak, Kurdish chieftain (approximate date)
- Miró II, count of Cerdanya and Besalú (Spain)
- Ren Huan, general and chancellor of Later Tang
- Sin Sung-gyom, Korean general (Three Kingdoms)
- Sigtrygg Cáech, Viking king of Scandinavian York
- Zhang Ge, politician and chancellor of Former Shu
