= 929 =

Calendar year

929 in various calendars
- Gregorian calendar: 929; CMXXIX
- Ab urbe condita: 1682
- Armenian calendar: 378; ԹՎ ՅՀԸ
- Assyrian calendar: 5679
- Balinese saka calendar: 850–851
- Bengali calendar: 335–336
- Berber calendar: 1879
- Buddhist calendar: 1473
- Burmese calendar: 291
- Byzantine calendar: 6437–6438
- Chinese calendar: 戊子年 (Earth Rat); 3626 or 3419 — to — 己丑年 (Earth Ox); 3627 or 3420
- Coptic calendar: 645–646
- Discordian calendar: 2095
- Ethiopian calendar: 921–922
- Hebrew calendar: 4689–4690
- Hindu calendars
- Vikram Samvat: 985–986
- Shaka Samvat: 850–851
- Kali Yuga: 4029–4030
- Holocene calendar: 10929
- Iranian calendar: 307–308
- Islamic calendar: 316–317
- Japanese calendar: Enchō 7 (延長７年)
- Javanese calendar: 828–829
- Julian calendar: 929; CMXXIX
- Korean calendar: 3262
- Minguo calendar: 983 before ROC 民前983年
- Nanakshahi calendar: −539
- Seleucid era: 1240/1241 AG
- Thai solar calendar: 1471–1472
- Tibetan calendar: ས་ཕོ་བྱི་བ་ལོ་ (male Earth-Rat); 1055 or 674 or −98 — to — ས་མོ་གླང་ལོ་ (female Earth-Ox); 1056 or 675 or −97

Year 929 (CMXXIX) was a common year starting on Thursday of the Julian calendar.

== Events ==
=== By place ===
==== Europe ====
- January 16 – Emir Abd al-Rahman III of Córdoba, Spain, proclaims himself caliph and creates the Caliphate of Córdoba. He breaks his allegiance to, and ties with, the Fatimid and Abbasid caliphs.
- February 3 – Guy, Margrave of Tuscany, second husband (third lover) of the Roman noblewoman Marozia, dies. He is succeeded by his brother Lambert as margrave of Tuscany.
- Early 929 – Siege of Gana: German king Henry the Fowler besieges Gana with an East Frankish army and conquers the stronghold. He establishes the fort of Meissen nearby.
- Early 929 – Henry the Fowler invades Bohemia from the north and marches on Prague. Duke Arnulf I of Bavaria invades Bohemia from the south. The Bohemians capitulate.
- Summer – The Slavic-Arab leader Sabir defeats a small Byzantine fleet and seizes Termoli (in Molise, on the Adriatic coast). He returns to Africa laden with booty and slaves.
- September 4 – Battle of Lenzen: Slavic forces (the Redarii and the Obotrites) are defeated by a Saxon army near the fortified stronghold of Lenzen (modern Germany).
- October 7 – Charles the Simple, former king of West Francia, dies in prison at Péronne, leaving Rudolph with no opposition except that of Count Herbert II of Vermandois.

==== Asia ====
- Mpu Sindok, ruler of the Mataram kingdom, moves his court from Central to East Java (modern Indonesia), probably after the eruption of Mount Merapi and/or invasion from Srivijaya.

=== By topic ===
==== Religion ====
- Pope Leo VI dies at Rome after a 7-month reign. He is succeeded (probably handpicked–by Marozia from the Tusculani family) by Stephen VII as the 124th pope of the Catholic Church.

== Births ==
- September 29 – Qian Chu, king of Wuyue (d. 988)
- al-Ta'i', Abbasid caliph of Baghdad (d. 1003)
- Fujiwara no Kaneie, Japanese statesman (d. 990)
- Guo Zhongshu, Chinese painter (approximate date)
- Saigū no Nyōgo (Princess Kishi), Japanese waka poet (d. 985)
- William, archbishop of Mainz (d. 968)

== Deaths ==
- January 28 – Gao Jixing, founder of Chinese Jingnan (b. 858)
- February 3 – Guy ("the Philosopher"), margrave of Tuscany (Italy)
- February 12 – Leo VI, pope of the Catholic Church
- March 26 – Wang Du, Chinese warlord and governor (jiedushi)
- April 9 – Cui Xie, Chinese official and chancellor
- June 7 – Ælthryth, English princess and countess of Flanders (b. 877)
- Before August 16 – Sancho Ordóñez, king of Galicia (Spain)
- October 7 – Charles the Simple, Frankish king (b. 879)
- Abu Ali al-Husayn ibn Ahmad al-Madhara'i, Abbasid fiscal director
- Abu'l-Musafir al-Fath, Sajid emir of Azerbaijan (Iran)
- Al-Batani, Muslim astronomer and mathematician
- Ashot II, king of Armenia (approximate date)
- Gao Yu, Chinese chief strategist
- Indra III, ruler of Rashtrakuta (India)
- Lothar I, Frankish nobleman (b. 902)
- Lothar II, Frankish nobleman (b. 874)
- Padla II, prince of Kakheti (Georgia)
- Thumal the Qahraman, Abbasid female judge
- Zhao Jingyi, Chinese general and governor
