= 926 =

Calendar year

926 in various calendars
- Gregorian calendar: 926; CMXXVI
- Ab urbe condita: 1679
- Armenian calendar: 375; ԹՎ ՅՀԵ
- Assyrian calendar: 5676
- Balinese saka calendar: 847–848
- Bengali calendar: 332–333
- Berber calendar: 1876
- Buddhist calendar: 1470
- Burmese calendar: 288
- Byzantine calendar: 6434–6435
- Chinese calendar: 乙酉年 (Wood Rooster); 3623 or 3416 — to — 丙戌年 (Fire Dog); 3624 or 3417
- Coptic calendar: 642–643
- Discordian calendar: 2092
- Ethiopian calendar: 918–919
- Hebrew calendar: 4686–4687
- Hindu calendars
- Vikram Samvat: 982–983
- Shaka Samvat: 847–848
- Kali Yuga: 4026–4027
- Holocene calendar: 10926
- Iranian calendar: 304–305
- Islamic calendar: 313–314
- Japanese calendar: Enchō 4 (延長４年)
- Javanese calendar: 825–826
- Julian calendar: 926; CMXXVI
- Korean calendar: 3259
- Minguo calendar: 986 before ROC 民前986年
- Nanakshahi calendar: −542
- Seleucid era: 1237/1238 AG
- Thai solar calendar: 1468–1469
- Tibetan calendar: ཤིང་མོ་བྱ་ལོ་ (female Wood-Bird); 1052 or 671 or −101 — to — མེ་ཕོ་ཁྱི་ལོ་ (male Fire-Dog); 1053 or 672 or −100

Year 926 (CMXXVI) was a common year starting on Sunday of the Julian calendar.

== Events ==
=== By place ===
==== Europe ====
- Spring – The Italian nobles turn against King Rudolph II of Burgundy and request that Hugh of Provence, the effective ruler of Lower Burgundy, be elected as king of Italy. Rudolph's father-in-law Duke Burchard II of Swabia is ambushed and killed near Novara, by the henchmen of Archbishop Lambert of Milan. Rudolph, disillusioned by the news, returns to Burgundy to protect himself. Hugh has himself crowned King of Italy. and appoints Giselbert I as count palatine of Bergamo (Northern Italy).
- Battle of the Bosnian Highlands: Bulgarian forces under Duke Alogobotur are ambushed and defeated by a Croatian army of King Tomislav, in the mountainous area of Eastern Bosnia. Tsar Simeon I meets his first defeat against Croatia, but overruns the Western Balkans several times.
- The Hungarians besiege Augsburg in Bavaria, then conquer the monastery of St. Gallen (modern Switzerland). After an unsuccessful battle with the locals, they burn the suburbs of Konstanz, then they cross westwards and defeat a Frankish army led by Duke Liutfred of Alsace.

==== Britain ====
- King Æthelstan of Wessex and Mercia annexes Northumbria, and forces Wales and Strathclyde to accept his sovereignty along with the Picts and the Scots (approximate date).

==== Asia ====
- May 15 – Emperor Zhuang Zong is killed during an officer's rebellion led by Guo Congqian at the old Tang capital of Luoyang. He is succeeded by his adoptive brother Li Siyuan (Ming Zong) as ruler of Later Tang. Li sends Yao Kun, as an emissary, to create a friendly relationship with the Khitan Empire.
- September 6 – Emperor Taizu dies after a 10-year reign. He is succeeded by his second son Tai Zong (Yaogu) as ruler of the Chinese Liao dynasty. Taizu's eldest son Yelü Bei (designated heir apparent) becomes ruler of the Dongdan Kingdom (former Balhae), a puppet state of the Khitan Empire.

=== By topic ===
==== Religion ====
- Pope John X allies himself with Hugh of Provence provoking the ire of Marozia, daughter of the Roman consul Theophylact I, who is married to Hugh's rival Guy of Tuscany.

== Births ==
- July 14 – Murakami, emperor of Japan (d. 967)
- Gao Huaide, Chinese general (approximate date)
- Liu Jun, emperor of Northern Han (d. 968)
- Ordoño III, king of León (approximate date)
- Ordoño IV, king of León (approximate date)
- Phạm Thị Trân, Vietnamese opera singer and Mandarin (d. 976)

== Deaths ==
- January 8 – Athelm, archbishop of Canterbury
- March 9 – Zhu Youqian, Chinese warlord
- April 29 – Burchard II, duke of Swabia
- May 15 – Zhuang Zong, emperor of Later Tang (b. 885)
- May 26 – Yuan Xingqin, Chinese general
- May 28
  - Kong Qian, official of Later Tang
  - Li Jiji, prince of Later Tang
- September 6 – Abaoji (Taizu), emperor of the Khitan Empire
- December 12, William II, duke of Aquitaine
- Abdallah ibn Muhammad al-Khaqani, Abbasid vizier (or 927)
- Alogobotur, Bulgarian nobleman (approximate date)
- Ero Fernández, Galician magnate (approximate date)
- Guo Chongtao, general of Later Tang
- Jin Feishan, empress of Former Shu
- Kang Yanxiao, Chinese general
- Liu, empress and wife of Zhuang Zong
- Pelagius of Córdoba, Christian martyr
- Wang Zongyan, emperor of Former Shu (b. 899)
- Wiborada, Swabian anchoress and martyr
- Xu, empress dowager of Former Shu
- Zhang Quanyi, Chinese warlord (b. 852)
