= Patriarch Stephen of Constantinople =

Patriarch Stephen of Constantinople may refer to:

- Stephen I of Constantinople, Ecumenical Patriarch of Constantinople in 886–893
- Stephen II of Constantinople, Ecumenical Patriarch of Constantinople in 925–928
