= Leo VI =

Leo VI (or Leon VI, notably in Greek) may refer to:

- Leo VI the Wise, Byzantine emperor 886 to 912
- Pope Leo VI, 928 to 929
- King Leo VI of Armenia (1342–1393), of the House of Lusignan, last Latin king of the Armenian crusader Kingdom of Cilicia (in Anatolia)
