= Rebellion of Bardas Phokas the Younger =

Civil war within the Byzantine Empire from 987 to 989

Rebellion of Bardas Phokas
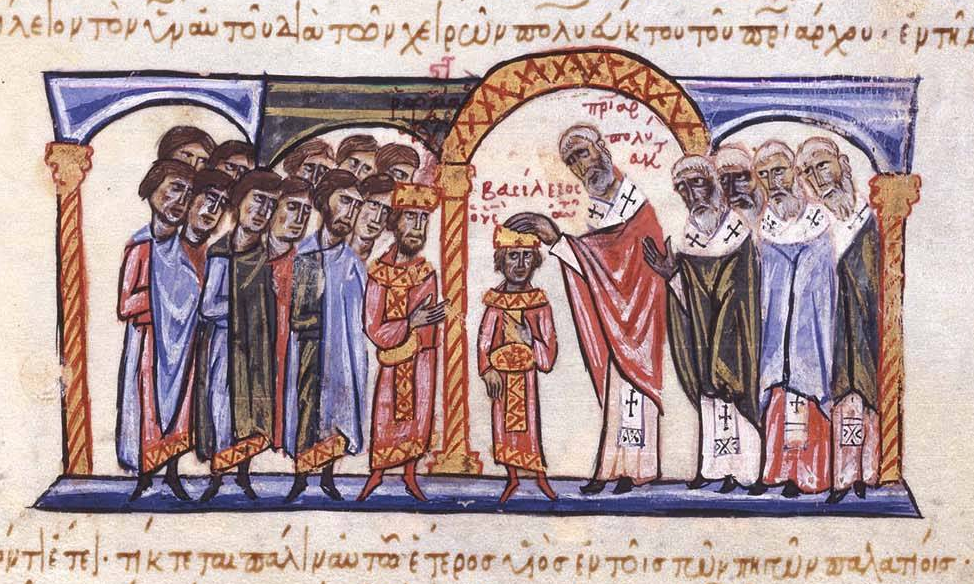
- The Coronation of Basil II as co-emperor by Patriarch Polyeuctus, from the Madrid Skylitzes
Date	February 987 – November 989
Location	Byzantine Empire
Result	Loyalist victory

Belligerents
Loyalists; Basil II; Kievan Rus'	Rebels; Phokas clan Support from: Principality of Tao; Buyid Dynasty: 2,000 Georgians, Armenians until 988	Rebels; Bardas Skleros: Arab mercenaries until mid-987

Commanders and leaders
Basil II; Gregory Taronites	Bardas Phokas the Younger †; Kalokyros Delphinas †; Leo Melissenos; David III of Tao; Nikephoros Phokas Barytrachelos; Leo Phokas of Antioch	Bardas Skleros

Strength
Loyalist forces plus 6,000 Varangians	Byzantine army of Asia Minor, plus 2,000 Caucasians	

The Rebellion of Bardas Phokas the Younger (February 987 – November 989) was a major war within the Byzantine Empire, fought mostly in Asia Minor.

During the second half of the tenth century the Byzantine Empire was characterized by emperors either devoted to or forced into long periods of campaigning mostly in the Near East, Crete, Cyprus, Antioch; many other territories were also conquered during this period. The success Byzantium experienced during this period was largely thanks to the Phokas clan, an aristocratic family who consistently produced competent generals, and their relatives. Indeed, during the reigns of Nikephoros II Phokas and his nephew John I Tzimiskes, these aristocratic generals supplanted the legitimate heirs of the Macedonian dynasty, the adolescent brothers Basil II and Constantine VIII, as the de facto rulers of the empire. When Tzimiskes died in 976 Basil II ascended to power. Quickly, however, tensions began to flare up within the royal court itself as the purple-born emperor attempted to reign fully out of the influence of the established court eunuchs. The figureheads behind the simmering tensions in the capital would come to blows in a major rebellion led by Bardas Phokas the Younger, the most powerful man left of the old Phokas regime.

== Prelude to the rebellion ==
The war was sparked by tensions circulating between the newly crowned emperor Basil II and the Phokades-Lekapenos clan. In 985, Basil dismissed the longtime chief minister, the eunuch Basil Lekapenos. He first placed him under house arrest in Constantinople and then later exiled him and confiscated his possessions. Following this, Basil attempted to weaken the overall power of the Phokades-Lekapenos clan and their supporters across the empire. Throughout 985 he demoted or dismissed suspected sympathizers. Bardas Phokas the Younger was demoted from Domestic of the Schools of the East to mere doux of the East, with nominal authority over Antioch, while the former doux of Antioch, a supporter of Lekapenos, Leo Melissenos, was recalled to the capital. Basil also recalled the katepano of Italy, Delphinas, as he too was a supporter of Lekapenos.

It was around this time that Bulgarian forces once again began to raid into Byzantine Greece. Basil, however, saw this as an opportunity: by crushing the Bulgarian forces, he could legitimize his reign at home while diminishing the distinguished military record of the Phokades carried on by Bardas Phokas in the east, as this was his main catalyst of support, he himself being a poor strategist. He departed for the western front in 986 and reached Serdica by summer. He besieged the city for twenty days before becoming worried on account of circulating rumors that Melissenos was planning a coup in the capital. On August 16, however, he was ambushed by the Bulgarian tsar Samuel's forces at the Gates of Trajan. His forces were scattered, and Basil was disgraced by the defeat. Not only was Samuil able to reconquer much of the former Bulgarian Empire, as it had been before the conquests of John I Tzimiskes, but support for Basil's reign fragmented both in Constantinople and in the east. Worse yet, news of the disastrous defeat would reach as far as Baghdad, where the former rebel Bardas Skleros had been granted asylum by the ruling Buyid dynasty.

== Beginning of hostilities ==
In a formal treaty in December 986, Skleros agreed to a number of concessions to the Buyids, including an exchange of Muslim prisoners, and cession of certain border fortresses, provided that they would supply him with support in an open rebellion against the Byzantine Empire. The Buyids, however, did not assist Skleros with a standing army; instead he recruited Arab tribesmen and Armenians on his way to the Byzantine border. In February 987, he reached Melitene, which surrendered to him, where he would declare himself emperor. The Emir of the Buyids, however, Samsam al-Dawla, who had supported Skleros, was overthrown the same year, and while formal support from Baghdad continued, in reality the possibility of actual Buyid intervention in the war all but vanished. At Melitene, Skleros was able to confiscate large quantities of gold and provisions, as well as corral local support, including from the Kurdish chieftain Bad ibn Dustuk.

Meanwhile, Basil attempted to counter the invasion of Skleros by elevating Bardas Phokas back to Domestic of the East. Phokas, however, who was already in control of most of Byzantine Asia Minor, in turn rebelled against Basil. Phokas then appealed to Skleros to join his cause, as Phokas, despite being the inferior tactician, commanded a much stronger force. The two came upon an agreement that if they were victorious, they would partition the empire, with Skleros taking Antioch and the eastern provinces and Phokas taking the rest. Skleros took to the plan, however, upon meeting in Cappadocia, Phokas promptly had him imprisoned and took over the rebellion for himself. Following this Skleros' Arab contingents returned home; Phokas now controlled all of Byzantine Asia Minor. Phokas quickly moved his armies towards the Bosphorus Strait in an attempt to blockade Constantinople and eventually cross into Europe and besiege the capital itself. While Phokas encamped on the Asian side of the Bosphorus, Delphinas, Phokas' ally and the former katepano of Italy, and Phokas' blinded brother Nikephoros, encamped at Chrysopolis. Phokas attempted to take Abydos without success, leaving Melissenos in charge of the siege, while Delphinas attempted to block grain imports into Constantinople, also without success, as the loyalists were able to use their command of the Black Sea to bring in food from some loyalist coastal cities, such as Trebizond.

== Basil turns the tide ==
At this time, Basil II made a foreign policy decision which would change the course of eastern European history forever. In exchange for Kievan Rus' assistance in his civil war, and a guarantee to Christianize the Rus', Basil agreed to marry off his sister, Anna, to the prince of Rus', Vladimir the Great. According to the historian Alex M. Feldman, Byzantine and Rus' sources together imply that the agreement meant that Vladimir would conquer the Crimean city of Chersonesus on behalf of his new brother-in-law, Basil II, rather than to spite him. Early in 988, Vladimir's forces arrived in Byzantium with his own troops along with a contingent of 6,000 Varangians. The same year Basil crossed the Bosporus and took Delphinas' camp by surprise, defeating his troops and taking him into custody. He was swiftly executed, while Nikephorus was arrested, as Basil's forces continued to move onward. As this offensive continued, the Georgian loyalist Gregory Taronites landed in Trebizond. He soon began to ravage Phokas' rear with impunity, moving towards the Euphrates. Phokas sent his son, also named Nikephoros, to the kouropalates of Tao, David III, in order to procure new troops for the rebellion. He managed marshaled 2,000 Caucasian troops.

Taronites was defeated by Nikephoros, but his armies soon disbanded and returned to their respective homelands as they heard of the defeat at Chrysopolis. In early 989, Phokas became more and more desperate, and intensified the Siege of Abydos. Basil, however, was speedily approaching his camp, and Phokas had no choice but to make preparations for battle. He died, suddenly, possibly of a seizure, on April 16, before the battle could begin. The rebellion quickly disintegrated without his leadership. On November 3, Leo Phokas, under pressure from his people, surrendered Antioch. Many of Phokas' former followers wished to continue the fight under Skleros, and so they released him from captivity, but he was by now in his late 60's, and was tired of the fight. By October, he negotiated a surrender with Basil, guaranteeing his amnesty. He retired to Didymoteichon, where he died on March 6, 991.

== Aftermath ==
Despite the inherently destructive nature of most rebellions, Bardas Phokas' rebellion in fact provided the Byzantine Empire with many long-term benefits. The first of these was the addition of the Varangians to the Imperial Guard. For the next three centuries this elite infantry force was the most effective component of the Byzantine army. Secondly, the resources-depleted David III was now in no position to withstand a concentrated Byzantine attack on his Iberian territories, and his countries were quickly overrun in the years after the civil war in retaliation for his support of Phokas. Kievan Rus' emerged from the civil war the newest Christian state in Europe, and one of the largest, largely as a result of the diplomacy sparked by the rebellion. The civil war also highlighted the inability of the Buyids to effectively influence Byzantine politics in a meaningful way despite their supposed military might and control of the Caliph.

== Sources ==
- Holmes, Catherine (2005). Basil II and the Governance of Empire (976–1025). Oxford, United Kingdom: Oxford University Press. ISBN 978-0-19-927968-5.
- Treadgold, Warren (1997). A History of the Byzantine State and Society. Stanford, California: Stanford University Press. ISBN 0-8047-2630-2.
- Whittow, Mark (1996). The Making of Byzantium, 600–1025. Berkeley and Los Angeles, California: University of California Press. ISBN 978-0-520-20496-6.
- Lilie, Ralph-Johannes; Ludwig, Claudia; Pratsch, Thomas; Zielke, Beate (2013). Prosopographie der mittelbyzantinischen Zeit Online. Berlin-Brandenburgische Akademie der Wissenschaften. Nach Vorarbeiten F. Winkelmanns erstellt (in German). Berlin and Boston: De Gruyter.
- Strässle, Paul Meinrad (2006). Krieg und Kriegführung in Byzanz: die Kriege Kaiser Basileios' II. gegen die Bulgaren (976–1019) (in German). Cologne: Böhlau Verlag. ISBN 3-412-17405-X.
- Kaldellis, Anthony (2017). Streams of Gold, Rivers of Blood: The Rise and Fall of Byzantium, 955 A.D. to the First Crusade. Oxford University Press. p. 45. ISBN 978-0190253226.
- Kennedy, Hugh (2004) [1986]. The Prophet and the Age of the Caliphates: The Islamic Near East from the 6th to the 11th Century (Second ed.). Harlow: Longman. ISBN 978-0-582-40525-7.
- Stoimenov, D., Temporary Byzantine military administration in the Bulgarian lands 971–987/989 (Vremenna vizantiyska voenna administratsiya v balgarskite zemi 971–987/989, Временна византийска военна администрация в българските земи 971–987/989), in Yearbook of the Sofia University Magazine. Scientific Center of Slavic-Byzantine Research (GSU HCSVP), ch. 82 (2), 1988, pp. 39–65
- Zlatarski, Vasil (1994). History of the Bulgarian state in the Middle Ages (Istoriya na balgarskite darzhavi prez Srednovekovieto, История на българските държави през Средновековието). Academic Press Marin Drinov. ISBN 954-430-299-9.
- Bozhilov, Ivan (1979). Bulgaria and Byzantium in the lower Danube in the end of the 10th century (Balgariya i Vizantiya na dolen Dunav v kraya na X vek, България и Византия на долни Дунав в края на X век). Academic Press Marin Drinov.
- Stoimenov, D., Temporary Byzantine military administration in the Bulgarian lands 971–987/989 (Vremenna vizantiyska voenna administratsiya v balgarskite zemi 971–987/989, Временна византийска военна администрация в българските земи 971–987/989), in Yearbook of the Sofia University Magazine. Scientific Center of Slavic-Byzantine Research (GSU HCSVP), ch. 82 (2), 1988, pp. 39–65
- Nikolov, Georgi (2005). Centralism and regionalism in early Medieval Bulgaria (end of the 7th – beginning of the 11th centuries) (Tsentralizam i regionalizam v rannosrednowekovna Balgariya (kraya na VII – nachaloto na XI vek), Централизъм и регионализъм в ранносредновековна България (края на VII – началото на XI век)). Academic Press Marin Drinov. ISBN 954-430-787-7.
- Pirivatrić, Srđan (1997). Samuil's state: appearance and character (Samuilovata darzhava: obhvat i harakter, Самуиловата държава: обхват и характер). Institute of Byzantology SANU.
- Romane, Julian (2015). Byzantium Triumphant. Pen and Sword Books. ISBN 978-1473845701.
