= 988 =

Calendar year

988 in various calendars
- Gregorian calendar: 988; CMLXXXVIII
- Ab urbe condita: 1741
- Armenian calendar: 437; ԹՎ ՆԼԷ
- Assyrian calendar: 5738
- Balinese saka calendar: 909–910
- Bengali calendar: 394–395
- Berber calendar: 1938
- Buddhist calendar: 1532
- Burmese calendar: 350
- Byzantine calendar: 6496–6497
- Chinese calendar: 丁亥年 (Fire Pig); 3685 or 3478 — to — 戊子年 (Earth Rat); 3686 or 3479
- Coptic calendar: 704–705
- Discordian calendar: 2154
- Ethiopian calendar: 980–981
- Hebrew calendar: 4748–4749
- Hindu calendars
- Vikram Samvat: 1044–1045
- Shaka Samvat: 909–910
- Kali Yuga: 4088–4089
- Holocene calendar: 10988
- Iranian calendar: 366–367
- Islamic calendar: 377–378
- Japanese calendar: Eien 2 / Eiso 1 (永祚元年)
- Javanese calendar: 889–890
- Julian calendar: 988; CMLXXXVIII
- Korean calendar: 3321
- Minguo calendar: 924 before ROC 民前924年
- Nanakshahi calendar: −480
- Seleucid era: 1299/1300 AG
- Thai solar calendar: 1530–1531
- Tibetan calendar: མེ་མོ་ཕག་ལོ་ (female Fire-Boar); 1114 or 733 or −39 — to — ས་ཕོ་བྱི་བ་ལོ་ (male Earth-Rat); 1115 or 734 or −38

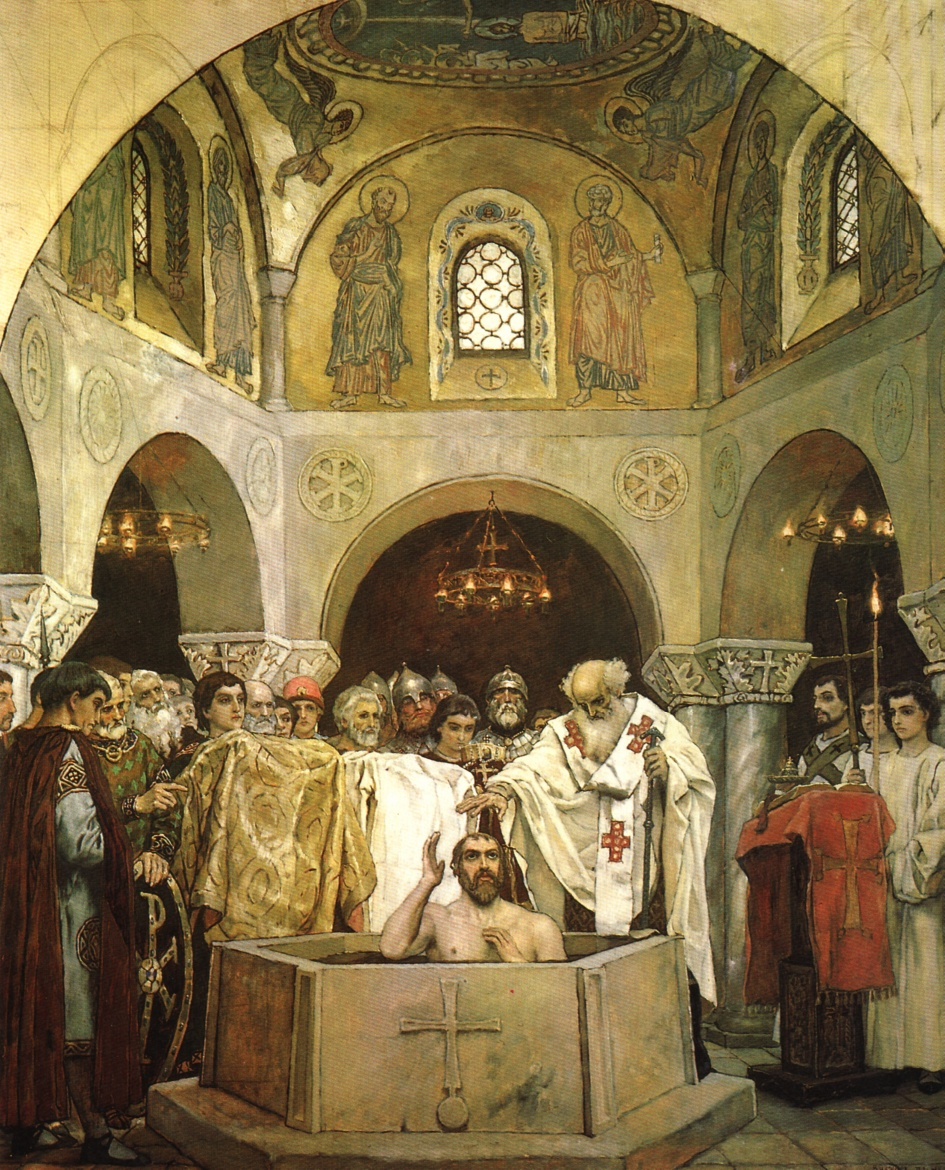
Prince Vladimir I (the Great) is baptised.

Year 988 (CMLXXXVIII) was a leap year starting on Sunday of the Julian calendar.

== Events ==
=== By place ===
==== Byzantine Empire ====
- Fall – Emperor Basil II, supported by a contingent of 6,000 Varangians (the future Varangian Guard), organizes the defences of Constantinople to meet a threat from the insurgents, Bardas Phokas the Younger and Bardas Skleros. Basil crosses the Bosphorus, and leads a surprise attack on the rebel camp of Kalokyros Delphinas, at Chrysopolis. Delphinas is captured and executed, either by crucifixion or by impalement (approximate date).

==== Europe ====
- April 1 – 16-year old Robert II of France ("Robert the Pious") is married to the much older Rozala (the widow of Arnulf II). The marriage is arranged by Robert's father, King Hugh Capet, to secure the loyalty of the County of Flanders.
- Borrell II, count of Barcelona, does not renew his allegiance to Hugh Capet. He becomes a de facto independent ruler, and starts minting its own currency – this will be confirmed legally by the Treaty of Corbeil (1258).
- Charles, Duke of Lower Lorraine (younger brother of the late King Lothair of France), revolts against Hugh Capet. He conquers the city of Laon in northern France with support of his half-brother Arnulf (archbishop of Reims).
- Almanzor (Al-Mansur), de facto ruler of Al-Andalus, continues his offensive against the kingdoms of León and Castile. King Bermudo II escapes to Zamora; the city resists for four days, but is finally sacked and captured.

==== China ====
- The Liao dynasty adopts civil service examinations in the 'Southern Chancellery', based on Tang dynasty models (approximate date).

=== By topic ===
==== Religion ====
- Grand Prince Vladimir the Great, ruler of Kievan Rus', marries Anna Porphyrogenita (sister of Basil II) and converts to Christianity. He is baptized at Cherson in the Crimea, taking the Christian name of Basil (in honor of his brother-in-law). Vladimir returns in triumph to Kiev, and begins the Christianization of Kievan Rus' to the Eastern Orthodox Church.
- The Mezhyhirskyi Monastery (located on the Dnieper River) is founded by Michael I, first metropolitan bishop of Kiev. He arrives with Greek monks from Constantinople.

==== Economy ====
- March 18 – The city of Odense (located on the island of Funen) in Denmark is founded. King Otto III grants trade rights and to the neighbouring settlements.

== Births ==
- Ali ibn Ridwan, Arab physician and astrologer (d. 1061)
- Matilda of Swabia, German noblewoman (d. 1032)
- Minamoto no Yoriyoshi, Japanese nobleman (d. 1075)
- Nōin, Japanese monk and waka poet (d. 1051)
- Pang Ji, chancellor of the Song dynasty (d. 1063)
- Shōshi, empress consort of Japan (d. 1074)
- Stephen I, king of Croatia (approximate date)
- Tilopa, Indian tantric practitioner (d. 1069)

== Deaths ==
- February 13 – Adalbert Atto, Lombard nobleman
- March 988 – Ishaq ibn al-Muqtadir, Arab prince
- April 28 – Adaldag, archbishop of Bremen
- May 6 – Dirk II, count of Frisia and Holland
- May 19 – Dunstan, archbishop of Canterbury (b. 909)
- October 7 – Qian Chu, king of Wuyue (d. 929)
- Bagrat II, prince of Tao-Klarjeti (Georgia)
- Guerech, Frankish nobleman (approximate date)
- Ieuaf (Idwal ab Idwal), king of Gwynedd (Wales)
- Judith of Hungary, queen of Poland (approximate date)
- Kalokyros Delphinas, Byzantine general (or 989)
- Sumbat II, prince of Tao-Klarjeti (Georgia)
- Vigrahapala II, ruler of the Pala Empire (India)
- Yelü Sha, Chinese general and statesman
