= 989 =

Calendar year

989 in various calendars
- Gregorian calendar: 989; CMLXXXIX
- Ab urbe condita: 1742
- Armenian calendar: 438; ԹՎ ՆԼԸ
- Assyrian calendar: 5739
- Balinese saka calendar: 910–911
- Bengali calendar: 395–396
- Berber calendar: 1939
- Buddhist calendar: 1533
- Burmese calendar: 351
- Byzantine calendar: 6497–6498
- Chinese calendar: 戊子年 (Earth Rat); 3686 or 3479 — to — 己丑年 (Earth Ox); 3687 or 3480
- Coptic calendar: 705–706
- Discordian calendar: 2155
- Ethiopian calendar: 981–982
- Hebrew calendar: 4749–4750
- Hindu calendars
- Vikram Samvat: 1045–1046
- Shaka Samvat: 910–911
- Kali Yuga: 4089–4090
- Holocene calendar: 10989
- Iranian calendar: 367–368
- Islamic calendar: 378–379
- Japanese calendar: Eiso 2 (永祚２年)
- Javanese calendar: 890–891
- Julian calendar: 989; CMLXXXIX
- Korean calendar: 3322
- Minguo calendar: 923 before ROC 民前923年
- Nanakshahi calendar: −479
- Seleucid era: 1300/1301 AG
- Thai solar calendar: 1531–1532
- Tibetan calendar: ས་ཕོ་བྱི་བ་ལོ་ (male Earth-Rat); 1115 or 734 or −38 — to — ས་མོ་གླང་ལོ་ (female Earth-Ox); 1116 or 735 or −37

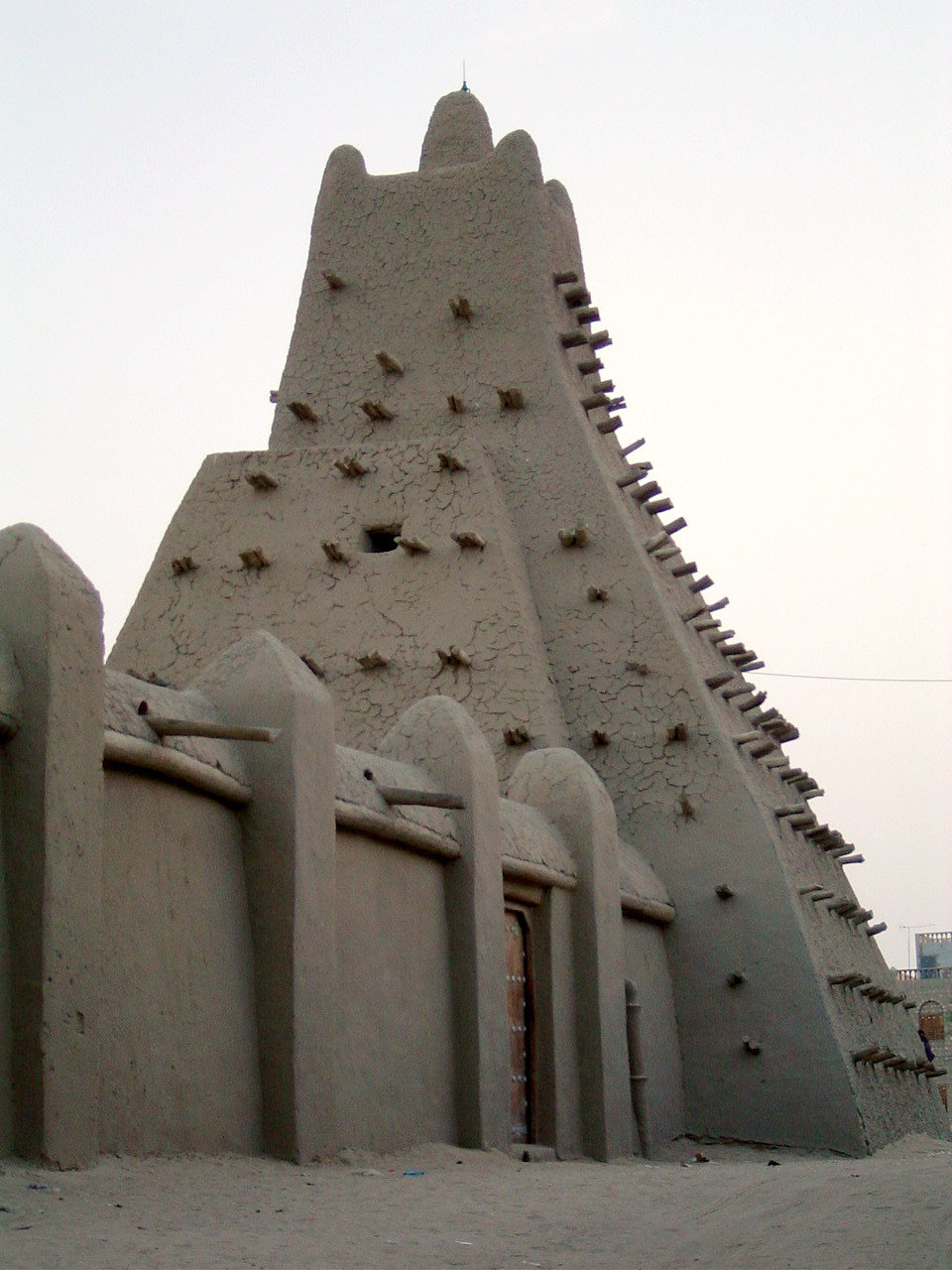
The Sankore Madrasah in Timbuktu (Mali)

Year 989 (CMLXXXIX) was a common year starting on Tuesday of the Julian calendar.

== Events ==
=== By place ===
==== Byzantine Empire ====
- Emperor Basil II uses his contingent of 6,000 Varangians to help him defeat Bardas Phokas (the Younger), who suffers a seizure during the siege of Abydos (threatening to blockade the Dardanelles). Phokas dies, ending the revolt and threat to Constantinople. Upon Phokas' death, the other rebel leader Bardas Skleros (who is captured and blinded) yields to Basil's superior forces.

==== Europe ====
- Summer – Charles, Duke of Lower Lorraine, captures the city of Reims by treachery of its new archbishop, Arnulf (the illegitimate son of the late King Lothair III). King Hugh I (Capet) demands that Pope John XV discipline Arnulf. But John XV, not wishing to defy Empress Theophanu, refuses.
- Winter – Theophanu arrives with her son, King Otto III in Rome to meet John XV. Crescentius II (the Younger) offers his submission to the Holy Roman Empire, in return for which she confirms his title as patrician of Rome.

=== Asia ===
- In Vietnam during the Early Le dynasty, provincial governor Dương Tiến Lộc seized control of the two provinces Hoan and Ái in an attempt to request annexation to Champa, which was rejected. He then rebelled against the emperor but was quickly suppressed within the same year, resulting in heavy civilian casualties in both provinces.

=== By topic ===
==== Religion ====
- Council of Charroux: French bishops under the patronage of William IV, duke of Aquitaine, declare the first Peace of God (or Pax Dei). This agreement grants immunity from violence to noncombatants (peasants and clergy) who can not defend themselves.

==== Art ====
- October 25 – The Hagia Sophia at Constantinople is struck by a great earthquake, causing the collapse of the western dome arch. Basil II asks the Armenian architect Trdat, the creator of the Cathedral of Ani, to direct the repairs.

==== Education ====
- Sankore Madrasah, at this stage a mosque, is founded in Timbuktu (modern-day Mali).

==== Astronomy ====
- September – Halley's Comet is at perihelion.

== Births ==
- September 5 – Fan Zhongyan, chancellor of the Song Dynasty (d. 1052)
- Adémar de Chabannes, French monk and historian (d. 1034)
- Al-Jayyānī, Arab scholar and mathematician (d. 1079)
- Chaghri Beg, co-ruler of the Seljuk Empire (d. 1060)
- Regelinda, margravine of Meissen (approximate date)

== Deaths ==
- January 23 – Adalbero, archbishop of Reims
- April 13 – Bardas Phokas, Byzantine general
- October 5 – Henry III, duke of Bavaria (b. 940)
- Chavundaraya, Indian general, architect and poet
- Chen Tuan, Chinese Taoist monk and philosopher
- Ch'oe Sung-no, Korean politician and poet (b. 927)
- Fujiwara no Korenari, Japanese courtier (b. 953)
- Fujiwara no Yoritada, Japanese nobleman (b. 924)
- Glúniairn, Norse-Gael king of Dublin (approximate date)
- Gofraid mac Arailt, Norse-Gael king of the Isles (Hebrides)
- Kalokyros Delphinas, Byzantine general (or 988)
- Kiurike I, king of Tashir-Dzoraget (Armenia)
- Pan, Chinese princess and wife of Zhen Zong (b. 968)
- Sharaf al-Dawla, Buyid emir of Kerman and Fars (b. 960)
