= Li Jitao =

Military general in the Five Dynasties and Ten Kingdoms period

- Traditional Chinese: 李繼韜
- Simplified Chinese: 李继韬
Transcriptions
Standard Mandarin
- Hanyu Pinyin: Lǐ Jìtāo
- Wade–Giles: Li3 Chi4-t'ao1

Liude
- Chinese: 留得
Transcriptions
Standard Mandarin
- Hanyu Pinyin: Liúdé
- Wade–Giles: Liu2-te2

Li Jitao (Chinese: 李繼韜; died 20 January 924), nickname Liude (留得), was a Chinese military general and politician of the Chinese Five Dynasties and Ten Kingdoms period states Jin, Later Liang, and Jin's successor state Later Tang. His father Li Sizhao, as an adoptive cousin of Jin's prince Li Cunxu (the later Emperor Zhuangzong of Later Tang), was an honored major general for Jin, but after Li Sizhao's death, Li Jitao took over Li Sizhao's territory and turned his allegiance to Jin's archrival Later Liang. After Later Tang conquered Later Liang, Emperor Zhuangzong was initially inclined to spare Li Jitao, but later found that he was still plotting against imperial governance, and therefore had him executed.

== Background ==
It is not known when Li Jitao was born. His father Li Sizhao was an adoptive nephew of the major late-Tang dynasty warlord Li Keyong the military governor (Jiedushi) of Hedong Circuit (河東, headquartered in modern Taiyuan, Shanxi), and his mother Lady Yang was Li Sizhao's wife and described to be very capable of managing finances, such that Li Sizhao's household became extremely wealthy. In Li Sizhao's biography in the Old History of the Five Dynasties, Li Sizhao was said to have seven sons, but only six were listed with their birth rank and said to be born of Lady Yang; among those six, Li Jitao was the second born, with an older brother, Li Jichou (李繼儔), and four younger brothers, Li Jizhong (李繼忠), Li Jineng (李繼能), Li Jixi (李繼襲), and Li Jiyuan (李繼遠). (Another brother, Li Jida (李繼達), was not given a birth rank in Li Sizhao's biography, nor was it clear whether he was born of Lady Yang or not; however, the Zizhi Tongjian suggested that Li Jida was next ranked after Li Jitao.) Lady Yang's large collection of money was said to be helpful to Li Sizhao's campaigns, as, for example, in 907–908, when he, then the military governor of Zhaoyi Circuit (昭義, headquartered in modern Changzhi, Shanxi) under Li Keyong, then the Prince of Jin (and then, after Li Keyong's death, Li Keyong's son and heir Li Cunxu), came under the siege of Li Keyong's archrival Zhu Wen (Zhu Quanzhong) at Zhaoyi's capital Lu Prefecture (潞州); Lady Yang's wealth was said to be able to allow him to supply his army despite his being under siege. Li Jitao himself was described as treacherous and lacking in righteous behavior when he was young.

== Control of Anyi/Kuangyi Circuit ==
In 922, under Li Cunxu's orders, Li Sizhao was commanding the Jin army against Zhang Chujin, whose father Zhang Wenli had led a mutiny against Li Cunxu's ally Wang Rong the Prince of Zhao, killed Wang, and taken over Zhao lands, before dying and leaving the territory in Zhang Chujin's hands. Li Sizhao was killed in a battle against the Zhao rebels, and Li Cunxu ordered Li Sizhao's sons to escort Li Sizhao's funereal train to the Jin capital Taiyuan for burial. Li Jineng ignored Li Cunxu's orders, however, and gathered up the several thousand soldiers from Zhaoyi in the Jin ranks, and instead began to escort Li Sizhao's funereal train toward Lu Prefecture. Li Cunxu sent his brother Li Cunwo (李存渥) after them, reiterating Li Cunxu's orders. Li Jineng and the other brothers not only disobeyed Li Cunxu's orders, but threatened to kill Li Cunwo, but Li Cunwo fled back to the Jin headquarters.

At that time, Li Jitao's older brother Li Jichou was serving as the prefect of Ze Prefecture (澤州, in modern Jincheng, Shanxi), and was expected to inherit the circuit after Li Sizhao's death. However, Li Jichou was weak in personality, and Li Jitao took the opportunity to have Li Jichou put under house arrest, while submitting a report to Li Cunxu claiming that the soldiers were forcing him to take over. As Li Cunxu was facing multiple campaigns at that time (against the Zhao rebels, Later Liang, and Khitan Empire), he was forced to acquiesce, and so he changed the name of Zhaoyi to Anyi (安義) (to observe naming taboo for Li Sizhao) and made Li Jitao its acting military governor.

Li Jitao, though, despite being named acting military governor, did not feel comfortable with the situation. His staff members Wei Zhuo (魏琢) and Shen Meng (申蒙) were also trying to persuade him that Jin lacked generals with talent and would eventually be defeated by Later Liang. Li Jitao's worries about Li Cunxu's intent were further exacerbated in spring 923, when Li Cunxu, at that time intending on claiming imperial title as the legitimate successor to the Tang throne, summoned both Zhaoyi's eunuch army monitor Zhang Juhan and circuit secretary Ren Huan to Wei Prefecture (魏州, in modern Handan, Hebei), where he was at the time, intending to give them positions in a new imperial administration. Instead, Wei Zhuo and Shen persuaded Li Jitao that this showed that Li Cunxu intended to act against him, and they were echoed in this by Li Jiyuan. Li Jitao thus sent Li Jiyuan to the Later Liang capital Daliang, submitting Anyi to Later Liang. The Later Liang emperor Zhu Zhen was greatly pleased, and changed the name of the circuit further to Kuangyi (匡義), making Li Jitao its military governor and granting him the honorary chancellor title of Tong Zhongshu Menxia Pingzhangshi (同中書門下平章事). In return, Li Jitao sent two sons to the Later Liang capital to serve as hostages. At the same time, fearing a Li Cunxu attack, he spent wealth to try to entice soldiers into joining his army. Guo Wei was among the recruited, but later was detained for homicide. Li Jitao appreciated Guo's talent and courage and set him free. (Li Jitao's subordinate, Pei Yue (裴約) the prefect of Ze, refused to follow Li Jitao's actions, but Zhu sent his general Dong Zhang against Pei; Dong was able to capture Ze and kill Pei.)

== Death ==
Later in the year, however, Li Cunxu (by that point having declared himself emperor of a new Later Tang as its Emperor Zhuangzong) captured Daliang in a surprise attack; Zhu Zhen committed suicide as the city fell, ending Later Liang. Later Liang territory came under Later Tang control. When Emperor Zhuangzong entered Daliang and seized Li Jitao's two sons, he commented to them, "You are this young, but you are already capable of assisting your father in committing treason. What will you be when you grow up?"

Hearing of Daliang's fall, Li Jitao fell into extreme fear, not sure what to do. He considered abandoning his post and fleeing to Khitan. Shortly after, he received an order from Emperor Zhuangzong, summoning him. Li Jitao was inclined to follow the order, despite Li Jiyuan's opposition. (Li Jiyuan argued that he should at least hold out in the city, and that going to see Emperor Zhuangzong meant immediate sudden death; however, other staffers argued that he would be spared due to Li Sizhao's great contributions.) Lady Yang gathered up her wealth and went to Luoyang (which Emperor Zhuangzong had made into his capital) with Li Jitao, and once they got there, she bribed Emperor Zhuangzong's favorite eunuchs and performers, who thereafter spoke favorably on Li Jitao's behalf, arguing that he was just misled and that he should be spared on Li Sizhao's behalf. Lady Yang also met with Emperor Zhuangzong and his favorite concubine Lady Liu, begging for Li Jitao's life. Therefore, Emperor Zhuangzong (at that time) decided to spare Li Jitao. He kept Li Jitao in the palace and treated him well, for over a month. (Indeed, it appeared that he was considered the legal military governor of Anyi (with the name reverted) at this time, as he was referred to as such in the annals of Emperor Zhuangzong's reign.)

However, Li Cunwo, still angry over Li Jitao's brothers' threats to kill him, rebuked Li Jitao repeatedly, causing Li Jitao to become fearful. He thus bribed Emperor Zhuangzong's attendants to have them request for him that he be sent back to Anyi. Emperor Zhuangzong, however, did not agree. Li Jitao thereafter tried to secretly send a letter to Li Jiyuan, asking him to have the soldiers display discontent by setting fires, hoping that if that occurred, Emperor Zhuangzong would decide to send him back to calm the soldiers. The letter, however, was apparently intercepted. Once Emperor Zhuangzong discovered this, he first ordered that Li Jitao be demoted to be the prefect of Deng Prefecture (登州, in modern Yantai, Shandong), and then ordered him executed, along with his two sons.

== Notes and references ==
- Old History of the Five Dynasties, vol. 52.
- New History of the Five Dynasties, vol. 36.
- Zizhi Tongjian, vols. 271, 272.
