= 877 =

Calendar year

877 in various calendars
Gregorian calendar	877; DCCCLXXVII
Ab urbe condita	1630
Armenian calendar	326; ԹՎ ՅԻԶ
Assyrian calendar	5627
Balinese saka calendar	798–799
Bengali calendar	283–284
Berber calendar	1827
Buddhist calendar	1421
Burmese calendar	239
Byzantine calendar	6385–6386
Chinese calendar	丙申年 (Fire Monkey); 3574 or 3367 — to — 丁酉年 (Fire Rooster); 3575 or 3368
Coptic calendar	593–594
Discordian calendar	2043
Ethiopian calendar	869–870
Hebrew calendar	4637–4638
- Hindu calendars
Vikram Samvat	933–934
Shaka Samvat	798–799
Kali Yuga	3977–3978
Holocene calendar	10877
Iranian calendar	255–256
Islamic calendar	263–264
Japanese calendar	Jōgan 19 / Gangyō 1 (元慶元年)
Javanese calendar	775–776
Julian calendar	877; DCCCLXXVII
Korean calendar	3210
Minguo calendar	1035 before ROC 民前1035年
Nanakshahi calendar	−591
Seleucid era	1188/1189 AG
Thai solar calendar	1419–1420
Tibetan calendar	阳火猴年 (male Fire-Monkey); 1003 or 622 or −150 — to — 阴火鸡年 (female Fire-Rooster); 1004 or 623 or −149

Year 877 (DCCCLXXVII) was a common year starting on Tuesday of the Julian calendar.

== Events ==
=== By place ===
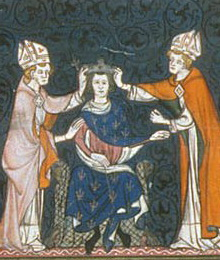
Coronation of Louis the Stammerer

==== Europe ====
- Summer – King Charles II ("the Bald") sets out for Italy, accompanied by his wife Richilde and a number of his chief vassals. He gives orders for an expedition, but Duke Boso (his brother-in-law) refuses to join the army. At the same time Carloman, son of Louis the German, has crossed the Alps into eastern Lombardy at the head of a Frankish army. Charles sends Richilde back to Gaul, for the coronation as empress of the Holy Roman Empire, and with orders for reinforcements. However, the Frankish aristocracy is more concerned with the attacks by the Vikings in their country, than the war with the Saracens in southern Italy. Pope John VIII receives Charles at Vercelli, where he requests help against the attacks by the Saracens in southern Italy. He forms an alliance with the Italian states at Traetto.
- August – Siege of Syracuse: The Aghlabids begin raiding the Byzantine territories, in the east of the island of Sicily. They besiege Syracuse, and blockade the fortress city by sea and land.
- October 6 – Charles II dies while crossing the pass of Mont Cenis at Brides-les-Bains, en route back to Gaul. He is succeeded by his son Louis the Stammerer, king of Aquitaine, who becomes ruler of the West Frankish Kingdom. Carloman, forced by an epidemic which breaks out in his army, returns to Germany. After the death of his father, Louis makes plans to receive the oath of fidelity from his subjects, but he learns that the magnates are refusing him obedience and rallying around Boso. The rebels are supported by his stepmother Richilda, and, as a sign of their displeasure, ravage the country. Hincmar, archbishop of Reims, intercedes and the rebels agree to a settlement. The magnates, whose rights Louis promises to recognize, all make their submissions.
- December 8 – Louis the Stammerer is crowned by Hincmar as king (not emperor) of the West Frankish Kingdom, in the church of Compiègne. The imperial throne will remain vacant until 881.

==== Britain ====
- Autumn – King Alfred the Great raises a large force, and marches on the Viking camp at the city of Exeter. His army besieges the Great Summer Army, led by Guthrum, and forces the Vikings to surrender. They flee north to Gloucester, and settle in the Five Boroughs (modern East Midlands).
- Battle of Strangford Lough: King Halfdan I leaves for Ireland, in an attempt to claim the Kingdom of Dublin from his rival Bárid mac Ímair. He is killed in battle at Strangford Lough, and a probable interregnum follows in York.
- Ceolwulf II is installed as puppet king of Mercia. The west of the kingdom comes under Ceolwulf's rule, while in the east the Five Boroughs begin as fortified Danish burhs.
- The Vikings invade Wales once more, and King Rhodri ap Merfyn ("the Great") of Gwynedd, Powys and Seisyllwg is forced to flee to Ireland (approximate date).
- King Constantin I is killed fighting Viking raiders, at the "Black Cave" in Fife. He is succeeded by his brother Áed mac Cináeda as ruler of Alba (Scotland).

==== Asia ====
- King Jayavarman III dies after a 42-year reign. He is succeeded by his cousin Indravarman I, as ruler of the Khmer Empire (modern Cambodia).

=== By topic ===
==== Religion ====
- October 23 – Photius I is reinstated as patriarch of Constantinople, after the death of Ignatius.

== Births ==
- January 31 – Wang Kon, founder of Goryeo (d. 943)
- September 10 – Eutychius, patriarch of Alexandria (d. 940)
- Ælfthryth, English princess and countess of Flanders (d. 929)
- Fujiwara no Kanesuke, Japanese nobleman (d. 933)
- Liu, Chinese empress of Qi (d. 943)
- Luo Shaowei, Chinese warlord (d. 910)
- Pi Guangye, Chinese chancellor (d. 943)
- Rudesind I, bishop of Mondoñedo (d. 907)
- Wang Rong, Chinese warlord (d. 921)

== Deaths ==
- August 5 – Ubayd Allah ibn Yahya ibn Khaqan, Abbasid vizier
- October 6 – Charles the Bald, Holy Roman emperor (b. 823)
- October 23 – Ignatius, patriarch of Constantinople
- Andrew the Scot, Irish archdeacon (approximate date)
- Bernard II, Frankish nobleman (approximate date)
- Carloman, Frankish abbot (approximate date)
- Constantine I, king of Alba (Scotland)
- Engelram, Frankish chamberlain
- Gérard II, Frankish nobleman (or 879)
- Halfdan Ragnarsson, Viking leader and 'king' of Northumbria
- Jayavarman III, king of the Khmer Empire (Cambodia)
- Johannes Scotus Eriugena, Irish theologian (approximate date)
- Musa ibn Bugha al-Kabir, Abbasid general
- Ōe no Otondo, Japanese scholar (b. 811)
- Savaric I, bishop of Mondoñedo (b. 866)
- Wang Ying, Chinese rebel leader
