= 879 =

Calendar year

879 in various calendars
- Gregorian calendar: 879; DCCCLXXIX
- Ab urbe condita: 1632
- Armenian calendar: 328; ԹՎ ՅԻԸ
- Assyrian calendar: 5629
- Balinese saka calendar: 800–801
- Bengali calendar: 285–286
- Berber calendar: 1829
- Buddhist calendar: 1423
- Burmese calendar: 241
- Byzantine calendar: 6387–6388
- Chinese calendar: 戊戌年 (Earth Dog); 3576 or 3369 — to — 己亥年 (Earth Pig); 3577 or 3370
- Coptic calendar: 595–596
- Discordian calendar: 2045
- Ethiopian calendar: 871–872
- Hebrew calendar: 4639–4640
- Hindu calendars
- Vikram Samvat: 935–936
- Shaka Samvat: 800–801
- Kali Yuga: 3979–3980
- Holocene calendar: 10879
- Iranian calendar: 257–258
- Islamic calendar: 265–266
- Japanese calendar: Gangyō 3 (元慶３年)
- Javanese calendar: 777–778
- Julian calendar: 879; DCCCLXXIX
- Korean calendar: 3212
- Minguo calendar: 1033 before ROC 民前1033年
- Nanakshahi calendar: −589
- Seleucid era: 1190/1191 AG
- Thai solar calendar: 1421–1422
- Tibetan calendar: ས་ཕོ་ཁྱི་ལོ་ (male Earth-Dog); 1005 or 624 or −148 — to — ས་མོ་ཕག་ལོ་ (female Earth-Boar); 1006 or 625 or −147

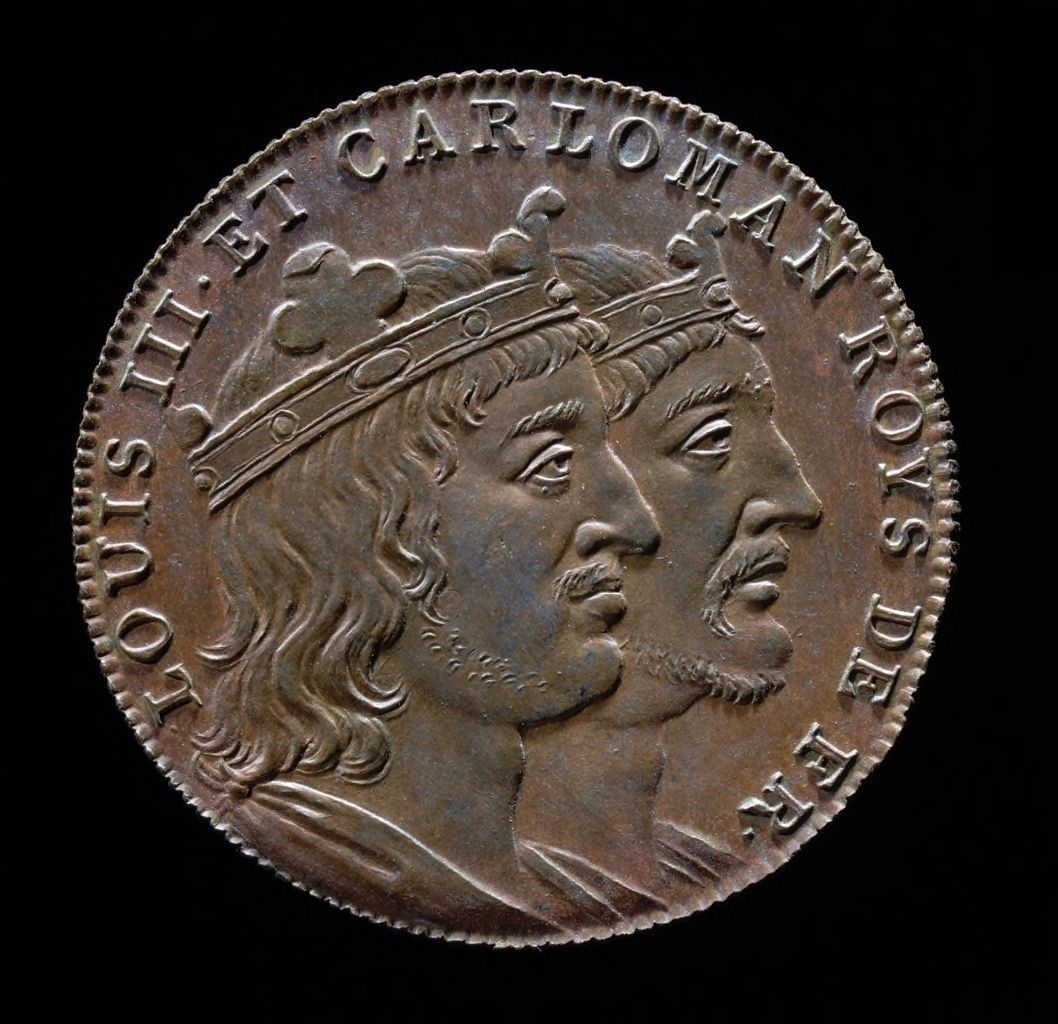
Coin of Louis III and his brother Carloman II

Year 879 (DCCCLXXIX) was a common year starting on Thursday of the Julian calendar.

== Events ==
=== By place ===
==== Europe ====
- April 10 – King Louis the Stammerer dies at Compiègne, after a reign of 18 months. He is succeeded by his two sons, Louis III and Carloman II. They are crowned at Ferrières Abbey, and rule the West Frankish Kingdom together as joint-kings.
- Baldwin I ("Iron Arm") dies, after 15 years as margrave of Flanders. He is buried in the Abbey of Saint Bertin (near Saint-Omer), and is succeeded by his son Baldwin II.
- Oleg, brother-in-law of the Varangian ruler Rurik, is entrusted to take care of his kingdom Novgorod after his death. He becomes regent of his son Igor.
- King Charles the Fat becomes ruler of the Kingdom of Italy, after the abdication of his brother Carloman of Bavaria, who has been incapacitated by a stroke.

==== Britain ====
- King Alfred the Great establishes a series of fortified villages (or burhs) to protect Wessex against Viking raids. He creates a standing army to defend the strategic ports, and builds a network of well-maintained army roads (known as herepaths).
- Viking leader Guthrum becomes 'king' of East Anglia. A Viking fleet sails up the River Thames, and builds a camp at Fulham (near London) to prepare for an invasion of France.

==== Arabian Empire ====
- Zanj Rebellion: The Abbasid Caliphate concentrates its efforts against the Zanj rebels in Mesopotamia. The Abbasid general Al-Mu'tadid leads an expeditionary force (10,000 men) to suppress the revolt. This marks the turning-point of the war.

==== Asia ====
- Guangzhou Massacre: The Chinese rebel leader Huang Chao besieges the seaport in Guangzhou, and slaughters many of its inhabitants and foreign merchants. According to sources, the death toll ranges from 120,000 to 200,000 foreigners.

=== By topic ===
==== Religion ====
- Fourth Council of Constantinople: Emperor Basil I calls for a synod, and reinstates Photius I as patriarch of Constantinople.
- June 7 – Pope John VIII recognizes the Duchy of Croatia, under Duke (knyaz) Branimir, as an independent state.
- Wilfred the Hairy, count of Barcelona, founds the Benedictine monastery at Ripoll, in Catalonia (Spain).

== Births ==
- September 17 – Charles the Simple, king of the West Frankish Kingdom (d. 929)
- October 19 – Yingtian, empress of the Khitan Liao Dynasty (d. 953)

== Deaths ==
- April 10 – Louis the Stammerer, king of the West Frankish Kingdom (b. 846)
- April 18 – Seishi, empress of Japan (b. 810)
- June 5 – Ya'qub ibn al-Layth, founder of the Saffarid Dynasty (b. 840)
- Abi'l-Saj Devdad, Sogdian prince
- Áed Findliath, high king of Ireland
- Ahmad ibn al-Khasib al-Jarjara'i, Muslim vizier
- Ansegisus, archbishop of Sens (or 883)
- Baldwin I, margrave of Flanders
- Ceolwulf II, king of Mercia (approximate date)
- Cormac mac Ciaran, Irish abbot
- Gebhard, Frankish nobleman
- Gérard II, Frankish nobleman (or 877)
- Hincmar, Frankish bishop
- Landulf II, bishop and count of Capua
- Li Wei, chancellor of the Tang Dynasty
- Rurik, prince of Novgorod
- Sulayman ibn Abdallah, Muslim governor
- Suppo II, duke of Spoleto (approximate date)
- Zdeslav, duke (knyaz) of Croatia
