= Croatian–Bulgarian battle of 926 =

Military engagement in the Dinaric Alps

Battle of the Bosnian Highlands
- Part of the Croatian–Bulgarian wars
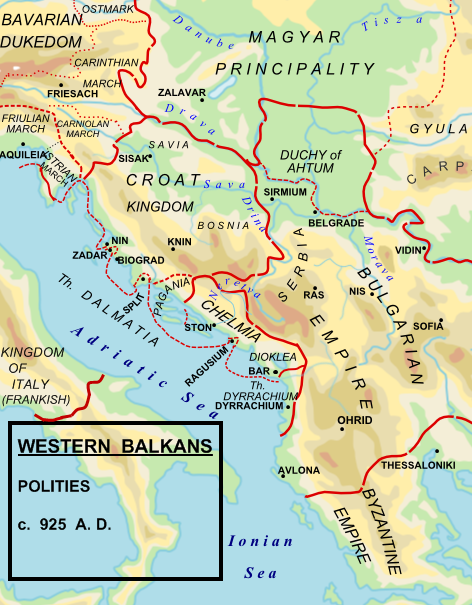
- Croatia and Bulgaria c. 925
Date	926
Location	Croatian–Bulgarian border in the Bosnian highlands (present-day eastern Bosnia and Herzegovina) 45°00′N 16°30′E
Result	Croatian victory: Tsar Simeon I sent a minor legion to break Croatia's alliance with Byzantium; Bulgarian offensive eventually repulsed; End of the second Croatian-Bulgarian war

Belligerents
Kingdom of Croatia	Bulgarian Empire

Commanders and leaders
Tomislav	Alogobotur †

Casualties and losses
Unknown	Entire army killed

In 926 a battle was fought in the Bosnian highlands between the armies of the Bulgarian Empire, under the rule of Bulgarian Tsar Simeon I, who at the time also fought a war with the Byzantine Empire, and the Kingdom of Croatia under Tomislav, the first king of the Croatian state. The battle is also known as the Battle of the Bosnian Highlands (Bulgarian: Битка при Босненските планини, Croatian: Bitka na Bosanskim visoravnima). It was fought in the Dinaric Alps of Eastern Bosnia near the rivers Bosna and Drina, the border area between the Kingdom of Croatia and the Bulgarian Empire.

Principal information on the battle is provided by the emperor Constantine VII of the Byzantine Empire in his work De Administrando Imperio ("On the Governance of the Empire") and in the collection of preserved historical writings called Theophanes Continuatus. Simeon's aim was to defeat the Byzantine Empire and conquer Constantinople. To achieve his aim, Simeon overran the eastern and central Balkans several times, occupied Serbia and finally attacked Croatia. The result of the battle was an overwhelming Croatian victory.

== Background ==
=== Events preceding the war ===
After the war between Trpimir I and Bulgarian Knyaz Boris I in 853, which resulted in a peace treaty, the relations between Bulgaria and Croatia improved greatly. Ambassadors from Rome regularly went through Croatian territory to Bulgaria and received escorts to the border, while the Pope had regular conversations with both countries. Croatia bordered Bulgaria probably somewhere in present-day Bosnia, between the rivers Bosna and Drina. The situation started changing in the early 10th century when the new Bulgarian ruler Simeon I started a campaign against the Byzantine Empire. The conflict went in favor of Bulgaria and the Byzantines found themselves in great danger.

Simeon captured a large part of the Byzantine territory in Europe and was crowned as "Emperor of the Bulgarians" by Patriarch Nicholas Mystikos in 913. He was later crowned at the church of Ohrid as "Tsar of all Bulgarians and Greeks" by the newly appointed Bulgarian patriarch in 925. However, the Byzantines always addressed Simeon as "prince" (archon) and the prelate continued to be referred to as an archbishop. According to the juridical reasoning of the time, only the Pope and the Byzantine Emperor could bestow royal or imperial titles, and an emperor might be crowned only by a patriarch. Byzantine Emperor Romanos I Lekapenos protested bitterly against Simeon's usurpation of the imperial title. The Patriarch of Constantinople, Nicholas Mysticus, did the same. In such a predicament, Simeon demanded Pope John X (914-928) to send him an imperial crown and to recognize the head of the Bulgarian church as Patriarch. Naturally, Simeon had to promise to recognize the papal primacy in the Church. John X accepted Simeon's request and sent a solemn mission to Bulgaria, headed by Cardinal Madalbertus and John, illustrious Duke of Cumae. The papal mission reached Bulgaria at the end of summer or during the fall of 926, carrying a crown and scepter with which they would crown Simeon as Bulgarian Emperor.

When the papal mission arrived in Preslav, Madalbertus started long negotiations with Simeon and the representatives of the Bulgarian church. Probably, Madalbertus convoked a church synod in Bulgaria as he later did in Split, in Croatia, on his way back to Rome in 928. The negotiations regarding ecclesiastical matters were successful, and Archbishop Leontius was created Patriarch in Preslav, still during Simeon's reign.

=== Reasons for the war ===
In 924 Simeon sent a large army against Zaharija in the Principality of Serbia. The Bulgarian armies ravaged Serbia and forced Zaharija to flee to Croatia. Serbia was annexed by Bulgaria by which Simeon considerably expanded his state. After Simeon's annexation of Serbia the Bulgarian state bordered the Croatian kingdom under Tomislav, who was a Byzantine ally. Croatia was now located between Bulgaria and the weakly defended Byzantine Theme of Dalmatia, a possible new target of Simeon.

Tomislav received and protected the Serbs who were expelled by Simeon from Rascia. Tomislav may have been granted by the Emperor Romanos I Lekapenos some years previously with some form of control over the coastal cities of the Byzantine Theme of Dalmatia and rewarded with some share of the tribute collected from the cities, thus securing the friendship of Tomislav. These events were a sufficient proof to Simeon that the Croats took the side of the Byzantine Emperor and that they would support him actively in the future. Therefore, Simeon saw Croatia, harboring his enemies and allied to the empire, as a threat and he could not direct all his forces towards Byzamtium since there was nothing to prevent Croatia from striking his rear.

== Battle ==
In 926 Simeon sent a large army to invade Croatia. The strength of Simeon's army is unknown. The commander of the Bulgarian forces in this battle was Duke Alogobotur. According to Byzantine historian Constantine Porphyrogenitus, Croatia at the time was able to field an army of 100,000 foot soldiers, 60,000 horse soldiers, 80 big battleships and 100 smaller battleships, but these numbers are generally taken as a considerable exaggeration. According to the palaeographic analysis of the original manuscript of DAI, the estimation of the number of inhabitants in medieval Croatia between 440 and 880 thousand people, and military numbers of Franks and Byzantines - the Croatian military force was most probably composed of 20,000-100,000 infantrymen, and 3,000-24,000 horsemen organized in 60 allagions. The Bulgarians were met by a Croatian army in the mountainous area of Eastern Bosnia.

The Croatian forces completely destroyed the Bulgarians. Arguably key to the overwhelming victory was the choice of terrain on which the battle took place. Bulgarians at the time when the battle started were in an unfavorable position and the Croatian army had made a surprise attack against them. Croatian soldiers would probably have been more experienced in fighting in the mountainous terrain of the Bosnian highlands. The Croats adjusted their military tactics, time and place of the battle to their opponents who possibly outnumbered them, which brought themselves a decisive advantage. Duke Alogobotur most likely perished in the battle along with most of his soldiers since he is no longer mentioned in sources.

== Aftermath ==
Simeon suffered a crushing defeat, but did not lose the bulk of his forces. He had sent a part of his army on that campaign and those forces had suffered heavy losses, but his overall army was strong enough to carry out another invasion of Byzantium. The Croatian-Bulgarian war did not continue in a significant extent, no territorial changes followed, and peace was concluded after the death of Emperor Simeon in 927. In 927 Pope John X sent his legates with Bishop Madalbert to mediate between Croats and Bulgarians.

Simeon died in May 927. His son and successor Peter I renewed the war with the Byzantines and concluded a peace treaty the same year. Byzantine sources, specifically George Kedrenos, say that the cause for Peter's peace treaty proposal was his fear that all his neighbors, the Hungarians, Croats, Serbs and other, could take the advantage of Simeon's death to attack Bulgaria. In addition, Bulgaria had a major domestic problem, a severe famine resulting from an attack by locusts.

== See also ==
- Croatian–Bulgarian wars
- History of Croatia
- History of Bulgaria
