= 976 =

Calendar year

976 in various calendars
- Gregorian calendar: 976; CMLXXVI
- Ab urbe condita: 1729
- Armenian calendar: 425; ԹՎ ՆԻԵ
- Assyrian calendar: 5726
- Balinese saka calendar: 897–898
- Bengali calendar: 382–383
- Berber calendar: 1926
- Buddhist calendar: 1520
- Burmese calendar: 338
- Byzantine calendar: 6484–6485
- Chinese calendar: 乙亥年 (Wood Pig); 3673 or 3466 — to — 丙子年 (Fire Rat); 3674 or 3467
- Coptic calendar: 692–693
- Discordian calendar: 2142
- Ethiopian calendar: 968–969
- Hebrew calendar: 4736–4737
- Hindu calendars
- Vikram Samvat: 1032–1033
- Shaka Samvat: 897–898
- Kali Yuga: 4076–4077
- Holocene calendar: 10976
- Iranian calendar: 354–355
- Islamic calendar: 365–366
- Japanese calendar: Ten'en 4 / Jōgen 1 (貞元元年)
- Javanese calendar: 877–878
- Julian calendar: 976; CMLXXVI
- Korean calendar: 3309
- Minguo calendar: 936 before ROC 民前936年
- Nanakshahi calendar: −492
- Seleucid era: 1287/1288 AG
- Thai solar calendar: 1518–1519
- Tibetan calendar: ཤིང་མོ་ཕག་ལོ་ (female Wood-Boar); 1102 or 721 or −51 — to — མེ་ཕོ་བྱི་བ་ལོ་ (male Fire-Rat); 1103 or 722 or −50

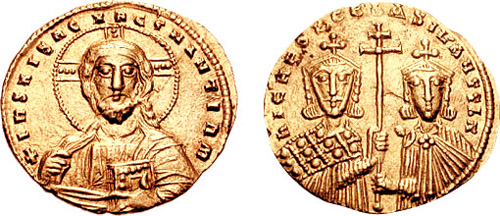
Basil II (right) and his step-father, Emperor Nikephoros II (r. 963–969).

Year 976 (CMLXXVI) was a leap year starting on Saturday of the Julian calendar.

== Events ==
=== By place ===
==== Byzantine Empire ====
- January 10 – Emperor John I Tzimiskes dies at Constantinople, after returning from a second campaign against the Abbasids in Syria. He is buried in the Church of Christ Chalkites, and succeeded by his 18-year-old nephew Basil II, who becomes sole ruler of the Byzantine Empire. The administration remains in the hands of Basil Lekapenos (an illegitimate son of the late Emperor Romanos I).

==== Europe ====
- June – Emir Abu'l-Qasim launches a raiding expedition into Byzantine Italy from Sicily. He imposes a tribute on the cities of Cosenza and Cellere. Meanwhile, a Fatimid fleet assaults the Apulian coast and raids the surrounding countryside. Abu'l-Qasim sends an army to Otranto and besieges Gravina, before returning to Sicily – bringing home hundreds of captives and slaves.
- July – Emperor Otto II (the Red) occupies Regensburg, forcing his rebellious cousin Henry II (the Wrangler) (who claims rulership over the Holy Roman Empire) to flee to Bohemia. Henry is deposed and Bavaria is handed over to Otto I of Swabia (a grandson of the late Emperor Otto I). He sets up the new "Grand Duchy of Carinthia" covering modern-day Austria.
- Summer – Otto II appoints Leopold I (the Illustrious), a member of the House of Babenberg, as margrave of the Marcha Orientalis (the later Archduchy of Austria). In order to maintain his possession in Southern Italy, Otto strengthens his army with 2,100 mailed horsemen (heavy cavalry) from Germany, of which around 1,500 are to be provided by the Churches.
- Summer – Pietro IV Candiano, doge of Venice, demands Venetian assistance to put down a revolt in his personal fiefs around Ferrara. The Venetians also revolt against Candiano and assault the doge's palace. Repelled by mercenary forces, they burn the neighborhood – bringing the palace down with it. Candiano and his family escape, but are killed by the mob.
- October 16 – Caliph Al-Hakam II dies after a 15-year reign in which he has ended the Fatimid Caliphate in Morocco and made the University of Córdoba the greatest institution in the world. Al-Hakam is succeeded by his 10-year-old son Hisham II as ruler of the Caliphate of Córdoba. His widow Subh becomes regent together with Almanzor the de facto rulers.

==== China ====
- November 14 – Emperor Taizu (Zhao Kuangyin) dies at Kaifeng after a 16-year reign. He is succeeded by his brother Tai Zong as ruler of the Song Dynasty. During his rule the Yuelu Academy (located in Hunan Province) is founded, which becomes one of the renowned academies (Shūyuàn).
- Zhang Sixun, a Chinese astronomer and engineer, employs the use of liquid mercury, in order that the escapement mechanism of his astronomical clock can function, and metal parts will not rust by using hydraulics (water), or freeze in winter.

== Births ==
- February 5 – Sanjō, emperor of Japan (d. 1017)
- Izumi Shikibu, Japanese poet (approximate date)

== Deaths ==
- January 10 – John I Tzimiskes, Byzantine emperor
- May 11 – Henry I (the Bald), German nobleman
- June 13 – Mansur I, emir of the Samanid Empire
- June 14
  - Aron, Bulgarian nobleman
  - David, Bulgarian nobleman
  - Moses, Bulgarian nobleman
- June 29 – Gero, archbishop of Cologne
- October 8 – Helen of Zadar, queen of Croatia
- October 16 – Al-Hakam II, Umayyad caliph (b. 915)
- November 14 – Taizu, Chinese emperor (b. 927)
- Al-Mansur Yahya, Zaidi scholar and imam
- Isarn, bishop of Grenoble (approximate date)
- Kvirike II, Georgian prince and chorbishop
- Madame Huarui, Chinese concubine and poet
- Mathgamain mac Cennétig, king of Munster
- Pietro IV Candiano, doge of Venice
- Rukn al-Dawla, Buyid general and emir
- Sun Taizhen, queen of Wuyue (Ten Kingdoms)
- Theodoric I, German nobleman (approximate date)
- Ali ibn Muhammad al-Iyadi, Arabic poet.
- Phạm Thị Trân, Vietnamese opera singer and Mandarin (b. 926)
