= Tryphon of Constantinople =

Ecumenical Patriarch of Constantinople from 928 to 931

Saint Tryphon of Constantinople
- Ecumenical Patriarch of Constantinople
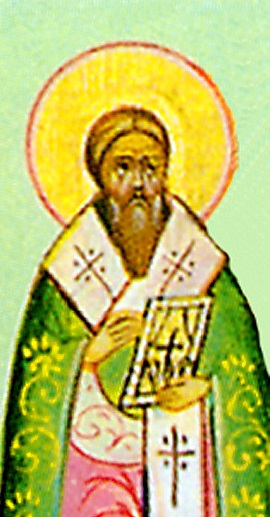
- Installed: 14 December 928
- Term ended: August 931
- Predecessor: Stephen II of Constantinople
- Successor: Theophylact of Constantinople

Personal details
- Died: 933
- Denomination: Chalcedonian Christianity

Tryphon of Constantinople (Greek: Τρύφων; died 933) was a 10th-century Ecumenical Patriarch of Constantinople. He is venerated as a saint in the Eastern Orthodox Church.

== Life ==
Tryphon was a monk in Constantinople. Patriarch Stephen II of Constantinople died on 19 July 928. Tryphon was raised to the post of the Patriarch on 14 December 928 by Byzantine Emperor Romanos I Lekapenos on condition that he would resign in favor of the Emperor's son Theophylact Lekapenos when the boy comes of age.

Theophylact turned 16 in 931 and Roman asked Patriarch Tryphon to step down as promised so Theophylakt could assume the Patriarchate. Tryphon refused to hand over the throne to a boy and remained in office. Romanos was infuriated and wanted to arrest him and execute him but Tryphon was very much loved by the people for his virtues.

Then the Emperor's advisors came up with a better plan to remove him from office without causing a rebellion. During a meeting with other bishops, bishop Basil accused Tryphon of being illiterate, and the Patriarch protested that he was not. Bishop Basil had an Imperial agent ask him to prove that by signing his name on a blank paper, Tryphon signed the blank paper and then Bishop Basil sent the paper to the Palace where the Imperial Clerks wrote the document of his resignation on the blank paper with Tryphon's signature.

When he found out that he was deceived it was too late, Theophylact had been already proclaimed Patriarch and Tryphon was forced to retire to monastery where he died in 933.

== Veneration ==
Tryphon is venerated as a saint in the Eastern Orthodox Church. His feast day is 19 April [O.S. 2 May].

== Notes and references ==
Titles of Chalcedonian Christianity
Preceded by Stephen II	Ecumenical Patriarch of Constantinople; 928 – 931	Succeeded by Theophylact
