= Alogobotur =

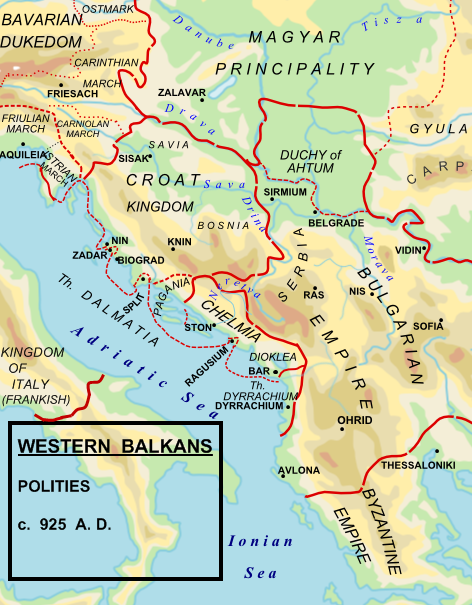
Political map of the western Balkan in 925 AD.

Alogobotur (Bulgarian: Aлогоботур) (died 926) was a Bulgarian noble and military commander during the reign of Tsar Simeon the Great (893–926). He was probably a komit (duke) of one of Bulgaria's provinces. Some scholars indicate that the name is not a personal name, but a Bulgar military title alp bagatur (great hero) or alo bagatur (commander of heroes).

Constantine Porphyrogennetos argues that for some time Alogobotur led all of the Bulgarian armies. In 926, Alogobotur was in command of a campaign against the Serbs who were plotting with the Byzantines against the Bulgarian Empire. He was then to invade the newly established Kingdom of Croatia which was in alliance with the Byzantine Empire. The Serbs were easily defeated and fled to Croatia but the campaign in the later ended with a disaster: the Bulgarian army was completely defeated in the battle of the Bosnian Highlands by the Croats under their King Tomislav in 926. Alogobotur most probably perished in the battle along with most of his soldiers.
