= Zhao Jingyi =

Zhao Jingyi (simplified Chinese: 赵敬怡; traditional Chinese: 趙敬怡; pinyin: Zhào Jìngyí) (died March 24, 929) was a general of the Chinese Five Dynasties and Ten Kingdoms Period state Later Tang, serving as one of Li Siyuan (Emperor Mingzong)'s chiefs of staff (Shumishi) from 928 to 929.

In 927, Zhao Jingyi was Vice-Prefect of Ye (鄴都副留守) before becoming generalissimo of the Right Guard (右衛上將軍) on September 2 of that year. He was also promoted to Prefect of Ye (also known as Xingtang Prefecture), the capital of Tianxiong Circuit (天雄, headquartered in modern Handan, Hebei). Some time later, he became deputy military governor of Tianxiong and on June 9, 928, the shumishi.

In October 928, Zhao and Lü Mengqi (呂夢奇) conspired to have their former colleague, Nie Yu (聶嶼) charged and executed. Nie Yu had been a prefectural judge (留守判官) in Ye and was rumored to be a political ally of another shumishi, An Chonghui.

In 929, Zhao was further put in charge of military and civil affairs in Bian Prefecture, but he died in the same month.

== Sources ==
- Xue Juzheng; et al., eds. (974). Wudai Shi (五代史) [History of the Five Dynasties] (in Chinese).
