= Nicholas Mystikos =

Ecumenical Patriarch of Constantinople (901–907; 912–925)

Nicholas I of Constantinople
- Ecumenical Patriarch of Constantinople
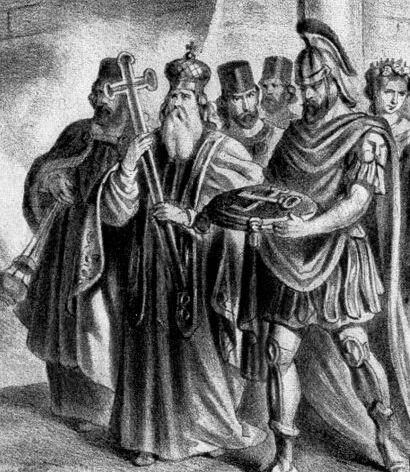
- Nicholas I (modern representation)
- Installed: 1 March 901; 15 May 912
- Term ended: 1 February 907; 15 May 925
- Predecessor: Antony II of Constantinople; Euthymius I of Constantinople
- Successor: Euthymius I of Constantinople; Stephen II of Constantinople

Personal details
- Born: 852 Italian Peninsula
- Died: 15 May 925
- Denomination: Chalcedonian Christianity

Nicholas I Mystikos or Mysticus (Greek: Νικόλαος Μυστικός; 852 – 15 May 925) was the Ecumenical Patriarch of Constantinople from 1 March 901 to 1 February 907 and from 15 May 912 to his death on 15 May 925. His feast day in the Eastern Orthodox Church is 16 May.

Nicholas was born in the Italian Peninsula and had become a friend of the Patriarch Photius I. He fell into disfavor after Photius I's dismissal in 886 and retired to a monastery. Emperor Leo VI the Wise retrieved him from the monastery and made him mystikos, a dignity designating either the imperial secretary or a judicial official.

On 1 March 901, Nicholas was appointed patriarch. However, he fell out with Leo VI over the latter's fourth marriage to his mistress Zoe Karbonopsina. Although he reluctantly baptised the fruit of this relationship, the future Emperor Constantine VII, Nicholas I forbade the emperor from entering the church and may have become involved in the revolt of Andronikos Doukas. He was deposed as patriarch on 1 February 907 and replaced by Euthymius. Exiled to his own monastery, Nicholas I regarded his deposition as unjustified and involved Pope Sergius III in the dispute.

About the time of the accession of Leo VI's brother Alexander to the throne on 11 May 912, Nicholas I was restored to the patriarchate. A protracted struggle with the supporters of Euthymius I followed, which did not end until the new Emperor Romanos I Lekapenos promulgated the Tomos of Union in 920. In the meantime, Alexander had died in 913 after provoking a war with Bulgaria, and the underage Constantine VII succeeded to the throne. Nicholas Mystikos became the leading member of the seven-man regency for the young emperor, and as such had to face the advance of Simeon I of Bulgaria on Constantinople. Nicholas I negotiated a peaceful settlement, crowned Simeon emperor of the Bulgarians in a makeshift ceremony outside Constantinople, and arranged for the marriage of Simeon's daughter to Constantine VII.

This unpopular concession undermined his position, and by March 914, with the support of the magistros John Eladas, Zoe Karbonopsina overthrew Nicholas I and replaced him as foremost regent. She revoked the agreement with Simeon I, prompting the renewal of hostilities with Bulgaria. With her main supporter Leo Phokas the Elder crushingly defeated by the Bulgarians at the battle of Achelous in 917, Zoe started to lose ground. Embarrassed by further failures, she and her supporters were supplanted in 919 by the admiral Romanos Lekapenos, who married his daughter Helena Lekapene to Constantine VII and finally advanced to the imperial throne in 920. The Patriarch Nicholas I came to be one of the strongest supporters of the new emperor and took the brunt of renewed negotiations with the Bulgarians until his death in 925.

In addition to his numerous letters to various notables and foreign rulers (including Simeon I of Bulgaria), Nicholas Mystikos wrote a homily on the sack of Thessalonica by the Arabs in 904. He was a critical thinker who went as far as to question the authority of Old Testament quotations and the notion that the emperor's command was unwritten law.

== Bibliography ==
- Nicholas I, Patriarch of Constantinople, Letters, Greek Text and English Tr. by Romilly Jenkins and L. G. Westerink (Washington, D.C., 1973).
- Kazhdan, Alexander, ed. (1991). The Oxford Dictionary of Byzantium. Oxford and New York: Oxford University Press. ISBN 0-19-504652-8.

Titles of Chalcedonian Christianity
Preceded by Antony II	Ecumenical Patriarch of Constantinople; 901 – 907	Succeeded by Euthymius I
Preceded by Euthymius I	Ecumenical Patriarch of Constantinople; 912 – 925	Succeeded by Stephen II
