= Cele Dabhaill mac Scannal =

Cele Dabhaill mac Scannal (858 – 14 September 927) was the Abbot of Bangor, County Down.

The Annals of the Four Masters contain the following notice of Cele Dabhaill's pilgrimage, sub anno 926:

Celedabhaill, son of Scannal, went to Rome on his pilgrimage from the abbacy of Beannchair; and he composed these quatrains at his departure:

Time for me to prepare to pass from the shelter of a habitation,
To journey as a pilgrim over the surface of the noble, lively sea.
Time to depart from the snares of the flesh, with all its guilt,
Time now to ruminate how I may find the great son of Mary.
Time to seek virtue, to trample upon the will with sorrow,
Time to reject vices, and to renounce the Demon.
Time to reproach the body, for of its crime it is putrid,
Time to rest after we have reached the place wherein we may shed our tears.
Time to talk of the last day, to separate from familiar faces,
Time to dread the terrors of the tumults of the day of judgment.
Time to defy the clayey body, to reduce it to religious rule,
Time to barter the transitory things for the country of the King of heaven.
Time to defy the ease of the little earthly world of a hundred pleasures,
Time to work at prayer, in adoration of the high King of angels.
But only a part of one year is wanting of my three score,
To remain under holy rule in one place it is time.
Those of my own age are not living, who were given to ardent devotion,
To desist from the course of great folly, in one place it is time.
It was grievous that Cormac the hospitable was wounded with long lances,
Indreachtach the noble, Muireadhach, Maenach, the great Maelmithigh.

An entry of the following year notes:

Celedabhaill, son of Scannall, successor of Comhgall of Beannchair, throughout Ireland, bishop, scribe, preacher, and learned doctor, died on his pilgrimage at Rome, on 14 September, and in the fifty-ninth year of his age. Of the year of his death was said:

Three times nine, nine hundred years, are reckoned by plain rules
From the birth of Christ, deed of purity, to the holy death of Cele the Cleric.
