= Shahid Balkhi =

Iranian scribe, philosopher and poet

Shahid Balkhi (or Shuhayd; Persian: شهید بلخی, romanized: Shahīd-e Balkhī; died 927) was a scribe, philosopher and poet active in the Chaghaniyan and Samanid courts. He is notable being for one of the first composers of New Persian poetry.

== Life ==
The modern historian Francois de Blois has argued that the name of "Shahid" is a misrepresentation of chronicles, stating that during that period the name was only used as a posthumous title for Muslims that had been killed in battle, and thus using it for a living person "would seem ludicrous and indeed sacrilegious." He instead suggests that the proper transliteration is "Shuhayd", a name that has in few occasions been attested, and is a diminutive of shahd (honeycomb).

Shahid was born in Jakhudanak, a village near the city of Balkh, where his father later moved and raised him. Of Persian stock, Shahid was bilingual in his mother tongue as well as Arabic. Little is known about him. He was close friends with the polymath Abu Zayd al-Balkhi and the Mu'tazili theologian Abu'l-Qasim al-Balkhi. The three of them, all connected to Balkh, appear jointly in the Yatimatu'l-dahr of al-Tha'alibi and the Mu'jamu'l-udaba of Yaqut al-Hamawi. Based on this, de Blois suggests that Shahid may have been part of the somewhat pro-Mu'tazili environment of his two associates. An adept scribe, Shahid was well known for his accurate copying skills.

Shahid died in 927.

== Philosophy ==
Shahid was a fierce opponent of Abu Bakr al-Razi, who was from the same philosophical background. Razi had studied under an obscure figure called "al-Balkhi", who may also have been Shahid's teacher, or regardless whose philosophical system Shahid adhered to. Razi is known to have written two polemics (about pleasure and eschatology, respectively) against Shahid. The Siwanu'l-hikma of Abu Sulayman Sijistani contains a large excerpt from one of Shahid's books about the "superiority of the pleasures of the soul over those of the body", which may have been what Razi addressed in one of his polemics.

== Poetry ==
Shahid also wrote poetry in Arabic, including two qit'as that ridicules Ahmad ibn Abi Rabi'a, who served as the vizier of the Saffarid ruler Amr ibn al-Layth (r. 879–901) between 891 and 900. Shahid wrote a similar poem about the governor Ahmad ibn Sahl, a distinguished governor in Khurasan. This led to Shahid's flight from the angry governor, first returning to Balkh after Ahmad's execution in 920. Shahid is best known for being one of the first composers of New Persian poetry. More or less 100 of his verses have survived in the accounts of anthologists and lexicographers. These contain an erotic poem of eight lines, a portion of a qasida written for the Samanid amir (ruler) Nasr II (r. 914–943), a poem that uses shifts between Persian and Arabic verses, and a number of couplets from a poem of a story, supposedly romantic-related. A number of the surviving verses mentioned in the dictionaries have a gnomic or philosophical tone. Some of his lines have been hypothesized to have subtle references to the religion of Manichaeism.

== Legacy ==
Shahid's close friend and teacher in poetry, Rudaki (died 941), dedicated an elegy to him;

Shahid’s caravan has left before ours,

Believe me, ours will also leave. Count the eyes, there is one pair less,

Measure the wisdom, thousands less.

Persian poets between the 10th and 12th-centuries mention Shahid in a respectful manner, but after that he fades into obscurity. The modern historian N. N. Negmatov calls Shahid "one of the best court poets of the Samanid Nasr II, and one of the leading scholars of the age." In the Prison Feats masnavi of the modern Iranian poet Mohammad-Taqi Bahar, several historical and fictional anecdotes of historical figures are used, including Shahid. The same work also narrates a fictional scene, where Bahar meets Shahid.

== Sources ==
- de Blois, Francois (1996). "Notes and Communications: Shuhayd al-Balkhī, a poet and philosopher of the time of Rāzī". Bulletin of the School of Oriental and African Studies. 59 (2): 333–337. doi:10.1017/S0041977X0003161X. JSTOR 619716. S2CID 170887778. (registration required)
- de Blois, Francois (1997). "S̲h̲ahīd". In Bosworth, C. E.; van Donzel, E.; Heinrichs, W. P. & Lecomte, G. (eds.). The Encyclopaedia of Islam, Second Edition. Volume IX: San–Sze. Leiden: E. J. Brill. pp. 208–209. ISBN 978-90-04-10422-8.
- de Blois, Francois (2004). Persian Literature - A Bio-Bibliographical Survey: Poetry of the Pre-Mongol Period (Volume V). Routledge. ISBN 978-0947593476.
- Epinette, Michèle (2022). "Rudaki". In Yarshater, Ehsan (ed.). Encyclopædia Iranica (Online ed.). Encyclopædia Iranica Foundation.
- Gould, Rebecca Ruth (2022). The Persian Prison Poem. Edinburgh University Press. ISBN 978-1474484015.
- Negmatov, N. N. (1998). "The Samanid state". History of Civilizations of Central Asia, Volume IV. Unesco. ISBN 978-9231034671.
- Pelló, Stefano Pelló (2015). "The Other Side of the Coin: Shahīd-i Balkhī's dīnār and the Recovery of Central Asian Manichaean Allusions in Early Persian Poetry". Nuova Serie. 88 (1/4): 39–55. JSTOR 24754106. (registration required)
- Rypka, Jan (1968). History of Iranian Literature. Springer Netherlands. ISBN 978-9401034814.
