= Stephen II of Constantinople =

Ecumenical Patriarch of Constantinople from 925 to 928

- Ecumenical Patriarch of Constantinople
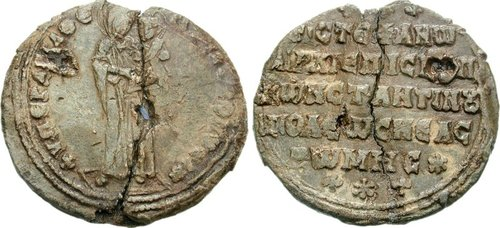
- Lead seal of "Stephen, Archbishop of Constantinople New Rome", either of Stephen I or of Stephen II
- Installed: 29 June 925
- Term ended: 18 July 928
- Predecessor: Nicholas I of Constantinople
- Successor: Tryphon of Constantinople

Personal details
- Died: 19 July 928
- Denomination: Chalcedonian Christianity

Stephen II of Constantinople (Greek: Στέφανος Stefanos; died 19 July 928) was the Ecumenical Patriarch of Constantinople from 29 June 925 to 18 July 928.

He appears to have been appointed to the post by Emperor Romanos I Lekapenos after the death of Nicholas I of Constantinople as a stop-gap until Romanos I's own son, Theophylact, was old enough to assume the post. Steven Runciman calls him a "deliberate nonentity". He is a saint, commemorated on 18 July.

== Notes and references ==
Titles of Chalcedonian Christianity
Preceded by Nicholas I	Ecumenical Patriarch of Constantinople; 925 – 928	Succeeded by Tryphon
