= Kalokyros Delphinas =

Byzantine general (died 989)

Kalokyros Delphinas (Greek: Καλοκυρός Δελφινάς, fl. c. 982–989) was a Byzantine general who served as catepan of Italy. He later rebelled against Emperor Basil II (r. 976–1025) and was executed.

== Biography ==
The anthypatos and patrikios Delphinas was an adherent of the powerful Anatolian Phokas clan and of the powerful chief minister of the Byzantine Empire, the parakoimomenos Basil Lekapenos, who secured his appointment as the katepano (senior military governor) of Southern Italy in 982. Delphinas held the post until 985, and presided over an improvement of the Byzantine position in the peninsula, aided by fortuitous external circumstances: the Holy Roman Emperor Otto II (r. 967–983) was defeated at the Battle of Stilo and died in the next year (983), while the Arabs were troubled by internal strife. Thus Delphinas was able to consolidate control over Longobardia, seizing Ascoli in December 982.

A few years later, Delphinas joined the revolt of Bardas Phokas the Younger against Emperor Basil II, and commanded the rebel army that had encamped at Chrysopolis, across the Bosporus from the capital, Constantinople. There, in late 988 or early 989, they were attacked by Basil II with Byzantine and Varangian troops and were defeated. Delphinas was captured and executed either by crucifixion or by impalement, an unusually harsh punishment that was intended as a warning to the other rebel generals; it is telling that aside from Delphinas, only one other captured rebel officer was executed during this civil war, and even that is not certain. A column in Delphinas's memory was erected at the spot of his execution, surviving into the 11th century.

== Sources ==
- Holmes, Catherine (2005). Basil II and the Governance of Empire (976–1025). Oxford, United Kingdom: Oxford University Press. ISBN 978-0-19-927968-5.
- Vlysidou, Vassiliki (2005). Η πολιτική του Βασιλείου Λακαπηνού έναντι της Δύσης. Byzantine Symmeikta (in Greek) (17): 111–129. ISSN 1105-1639. Archived from the original on 2016-01-31.
