= Ibn al-Dahhak =

10th-century Kurdish Chieftain (927)

- Died: c. 927; Fortress of al-Ja'fari, near Tarsus, Abbasid Caliphate
- Criminal charges: Treason
- Penalty: Execution on the orders of Tarsus's Abbasid governor

Details
- Victims: unknown
- Date: 927
- Killed: unknown

Ibn al-Dahhak (d. 927, fortress of al-Ja'fari) was a Kurdish chieftain, who abandoned Islam, converted to Christianity and entered the service of the Byzantine emperor Romanos I Lekapenos (r. 920–944). Romanos gave him rich gifts and sent him back to his base, the fortress of al-Ja'fari, located probably in the vicinity of Tarsus.

In late autumn 927, however, he was attacked, defeated and killed by the Abbasid governor of Tarsus, Thamal al-Dulafi.

== Sources ==
- Lilie, Ralph-Johannes; Ludwig, Claudia; Pratsch, Thomas; Zielke, Beate (2013). Prosopographie der mittelbyzantinischen Zeit Online. Berlin-Brandenburgische Akademie der Wissenschaften. Nach Vorarbeiten F. Winkelmanns erstellt (in German). Berlin and Boston: De Gruyter.
