= Pope Leo VI =

Head of the Catholic Church from 928 to 929

- Bishop of Rome
- Church: Catholic Church
- Papacy began: June 928
- Papacy ended: February 929
- Predecessor: John X
- Successor: Stephen VII
- Previous post: Cardinal-Priest of Santa Susanna (916-928)

Orders
- Created cardinal: 916 by Pope John X

Personal details
- Born: 880 Rome, Papal States
- Died: February 929 Rome, Papal States
- Parents: Christophorus

Pope Leo VI (880 – 12 February 929) was the 123rd bishop of Rome and nominal ruler of the Papal States for just over seven months, from June 928 to his death in February 929. His pontificate occurred during the period known as the Saeculum obscurum.

== Family and early career ==
Leo VI was born into a Roman family, and his father was Christophorus, who had been primicerius under Pope John VIII around the year 876. Tradition has it that he was a member of the Sanguini family. Before his pontificate, Leo served as the cardinal-priest of Santa Susanna.

== Pontificate ==
Leo was elected pope around June 928, during a period of anarchy. He was chosen by the senatrix Marozia, who had gained control of Rome via the domination of her husband Guy, Margrave of Tuscany, and who had ordered the imprisonment and death of Leo’s predecessor, John X.

During his brief pontificate, Leo confirmed the decisions of the Synod of Spalato. He completed his predecessor’s investigations into the ecclesiastical situation in Dalmatia, and proceeded to give the pallium to Archbishop John of Salona, and ordered all the bishops of Dalmatia to obey him. He also ordered the bishop of Nona and others to limit themselves to the extent of their dioceses. Leo then banned castrati from marrying. He also issued an appeal for help against the Arab raiders who were threatening Rome, stating that:

”Whoever died faithful in this struggle will not see himself refused entry into the heavenly kingdom.”

The chronicler Flodoard said of him:

”Through the virtue of Peter, Leo the sixth was taken and received, he was preserved for seven months and five days, and like his predecessors, he joined the company of the prophets.”

Leo died in February 929, and was succeeded by Stephen VII. He was buried at St. Peter’s Basilica.

Catholic Church titles
Preceded by John X	Pope; 928–929	Succeeded by Stephen VII
