= Leo Argyros (10th century) =

- Λέων Ἀργυρός
- Relatives: Eustathios Argyros (father), Pothos Argyros (brother), Marianos Argyros (son), Romanos Argyros (son), great-grandfather of Romanos III Argyros
- Military career
- Allegiance: Byzantine Empire
- Branch: Byzantine army
- Service years: 910–922 (approximately)
- Rank: Domestic of the Schools (possibly), strategos, patrikios, magistros, protospatharios
- Commands: theme of Sebasteia, possibly Domestic of the Schools
- Conflicts: Byzantine–Bulgarian wars, Battle of Achelous (917), Battle of Pegae

Leo Argyros (Greek: Λέων Ἀργυρός) was a Byzantine aristocrat and general active in the first decades of the 10th century. He began his career as a manglabites and later became military governor (strategos) of Sebasteia under Emperor Leo VI the Wise. Alongside his brothers Pothos and Romanos, he participated in several key military campaigns, including the Battle of Achelous in 917 and the Battle of Pegae in 922. Rising to the ranks of patrikios and magistros under Romanos I Lekapenos. Leo is the great-grandfather Emperor Romanos III Argyros.

== Personal life and family ==
He was the son of the magistros Eustathios Argyros, droungarios of the Watch under Leo VI (ruled 886–912). In ca. 910, Leo and his brother Pothos Argyros were serving at court as manglabites (personal bodyguards of the emperor), when their father was poisoned after being suspected by Leo for plotting against him. The two brothers brought their father's body for burial to their ancestral monastery of Saint Elizabeth in the Charsianon district.

Leo Argyros had two sons, Marianos Argyros and Romanos Argyros. Both were firm supporters of Romanos Lekapenos and enjoyed high court titles; Romanos Argyros even married the emperor's daughter, Agathe. Through Romanos, Leo Argyros was the great-grandfather of Emperor Romanos III Argyros (r. 1028–1034).

== Career ==
Pothos and Leo both followed military careers. According to Constantine VII Porphyrogennetos, already in 911, Leo, despite his youth, became strategos of the theme of Sebasteia, with the rank of protospatharios. Both brothers played a distinguished role during the regency of Empress Zoe Karbonopsina (913–919). Leo and a younger brother, Romanos, participated in the campaign against Bulgaria that ended in the disastrous Battle of Achelous on 20 August 917.

Under Romanos I (r. 920–944), Leo reached the highest offices and attained the ranks of patrikios and eventually magistros. In April 922 he commanded, along with his brother Pothos, who was then Domestic of the Schools, the rhaiktor John, and the droungarios of the imperial fleet Alexios Mosele, the army that confronted a Bulgarian raid under the kavkhan Menikos, that had reached the outskirts of Constantinople. The subsequent Battle of Pegae was a rout for the Byzantines, but the two Argyroi managed to escape to safety in a nearby fort. At some point, Leo too served as Domestic of the Schools, but it is unclear when. Jean-François Vannier suggested the period between Pegae and June 922, when John Kourkouas held the post, but this seems too brief. Rodolphe Guilland also suggested a brief tenure sometime before 922, or perhaps after Romanos Lekapenos' fall in 944. On the other hand, it is also possible that Byzantine historians confused Leo with his brother Pothos.

== Sources ==
- Cheynet, J.-C.; Vannier, J.-F. (2003). "Les Argyroi". Zbornik Radova Vizantološkog Instituta (in French). 40: 57–90. doi:10.2298/ZRVI0340057C. ISSN 0584-9888.
- Guilland, Rodolphe (1967). Recherches sur les institutions byzantines (2 vols.) [Studies on the Byzantine Institutions]. Berliner byzantinische Arbeiten 35 (in French). Berlin and Amsterdam: Akademie-Verlag & Adolf M. Hakkert. OCLC 878894516.
- Lilie, Ralph-Johannes; Ludwig, Claudia; Pratsch, Thomas; Zielke, Beate (2013). Prosopographie der mittelbyzantinischen Zeit Online. Berlin-Brandenburgische Akademie der Wissenschaften. Nach Vorarbeiten F. Winkelmanns erstellt (in German). Berlin and Boston: De Gruyter.
- Tougher, Shaun (1997). The Reign of Leo VI (886-912): Politics and People. Leiden; New York; Köln: Brill. ISBN 9004108114.
