= John the Rhaiktor =

Byzantine official and chief minister under Romanos I

John the Rhaiktor (Greek: Ἰωάννης ὁ ῥαίκτωρ; fl. 922–947) was a Byzantine official, who served as the chief minister (paradynasteuon) of the empire in the early reign of Romanos I Lekapenos. Facing accusations, he left his office and retired to a monastery, but remained a confidant of the emperor, for whom he undertook a delicate diplomatic mission to Bulgaria in 929. He is likely to be identified as one of the conspirators who in 947 intended to depose Constantine VII and restore Romanos I's son Stephen Lekapenos to the throne.

== Life ==
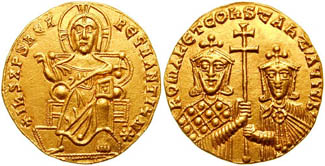
Gold solidus of Romanos I with Constantine VII

John is first mentioned in 922, in the aftermath of a failed conspiracy against emperor Romanos I Lekapenos (reigned 920–944) and his junior colleague Constantine VII (r. 913–959). At the time, he was a presbyter, held the title of rhaiktor, and was the chief councillor (paradynasteuon) to Romanos I. In the aftermath of the conspiracy's revelation by the servant of one of the conspirators, he took the servant into the imperial household. In addition, he argued successfully for the promotion of Constantine Lorikatos, the protokarabos (captain of the imperial dromon) and loyal partisan of Romanos, to the post of protospatharios tes phiales, which had been held until then by one of the men implicated in the conspiracy.

In spring of 922 he was sent, along with the admiral Alexios Mosele, the Domestic of the Schools Pothos Argyros, and his brother Leo Argyros, to confront a Bulgarian invasion. In the ensuing Battle of Pegae near Constantinople, John fled the field almost immediately and sought refuge aboard a nearby warship, while the battle resulted in a rout for the Byzantines, who lost many men and officers, both dead and captive. Shortly afterwards, unspecified charges were brought against him before Emperor Romanos. Feigning illness, he left the imperial palace and retired to a monastery he had founded, near Galakrenai. He was succeeded as paradynasteuon by John Mystikos.

Despite the accusations and his becoming a monk, John seems to have retained Romanos' confidence, for probably in 929 he was sent on a diplomatic mission to Bulgaria. Officially his mission was to reconcile Tsar Peter (r. 927–969) with his younger brother Ivan, who had unsuccessfully revolted against him and had been forced to become a monk, but in reality he was to bring Ivan to Constantinople. As soon as Ivan was in Constantinople, he abandoned his monastic habit and married a Byzantine noblewoman. John and Romanos' eldest son and co-emperor Christopher Lekapenos (r. 921–931) were witnesses at the ceremony.

John is probably to be identified with John the Rhaiktor who in December 947 was part of a failed conspiracy to depose Constantine VII, now sole emperor, and restore Romanos' younger son Stephen Lekapenos to the throne. The conspirators were variously blinded, their ears and noses cut, publicly humiliated through the streets of the capital, and exiled.

== Sources ==
- Lilie, Ralph-Johannes; Ludwig, Claudia; Pratsch, Thomas; Zielke, Beate (2013). Prosopographie der mittelbyzantinischen Zeit Online. Berlin-Brandenburgische Akademie der Wissenschaften. Nach Vorarbeiten F. Winkelmanns erstellt (in German). Berlin and Boston: De Gruyter.
- Runciman, Steven (1988) [1929]. The Emperor Romanus Lecapenus and His Reign: A Study of Tenth-Century Byzantium. Cambridge, United Kingdom: Cambridge University Press. ISBN 0-521-35722-5.
