= Eustathios Argyros (general under Leo VI) =

Byzantine general and aristocrat

- Died: ca. 910; Mt. Aran
- Relatives: Leo Argyros (father), Pothos Argyros, Leo Argyros, Romanos Argyros (sons)
- Military career
- Allegiance: Byzantine Empire
- Rank: strategos of the Anatolics and of Charsianon, Drungary of the Watch

Eustathios Argyros (Greek: Εὐστάθιος Ἀργυρός; died ca. 910) was a Byzantine aristocrat and one of the most prominent generals under Emperor Leo VI the Wise (r. 886–912). The first member of the Argyros family to rise to high posts, he fought with distinction against the Arabs in the east, before being disgraced ca. 907, possibly in connection with the flight of Andronikos Doukas to the Arabs. Rehabilitated soon after, he was appointed as strategos of Charsianon, from which post he oversaw the settlement of Armenian lords as march-wardens along the Empire's eastern frontier. Promoted to commander of the imperial bodyguard in late 908, he again fell into disgrace shortly after and died of poison (apparently a suicide) on his way to his estates.

== Life ==
Eustathios Argyros was the son of the tourmarches Leo Argyros, the founder of the noble Argyros family.

Nothing is known of his life or prior to the turn of the 10th century, although he may have been in imperial service as early as 866, when a man of the same name is recorded as protostrator of the Caesar Bardas in connection with the latter's murder on 21 April. The Byzantine historians praise Eustathios Argyros as an intelligent, valiant, prudent and just man, and account him, along with Andronikos Doukas, as the best of Leo VI's generals. The historians Jean-Claude Cheynet and Jean-François Vannier, experts on Byzantine prosopography, consider him "the true founder of the family's glory".

Map of the Arab–Byzantine frontier zone

Although he is sometimes identified with an admiral active in ca. 902–904 (see below), his life is only securely attested after 904. At this time, evidently after a succession of—unknown—military commands, Eustathios had reached, according to Theophanes Continuatus, the rank of patrikios and hypostrategos of the Anatolic Theme. The significance of the term "hypostrategos" has been debated; normally it would designate the second-in-command to the strategos or military governor of a theme, but Vannier suggested that on account of his high title of patrikios, Argyros was actually the strategos. Theophanes Continuatus further extols Argyros and mentions that he scored several successes against the Arabs in the east, most likely a reference to the great Byzantine victory over the Arabs of Tarsus and Mopsuestia at Germanikeia in December 904, under the overall command of Andronikos Doukas. He then fell into disgrace and was exiled. Although no details or reasons are offered for his exile, this has been interpreted by modern scholars as being connected to the failed rebellion and flight of Andronikos Doukas to the Arabs in 906–907. Eustathios was rehabilitated soon after; if indeed his disgrace was related to the flight of Andronikos Doukas, this happened likely in 907/8, when Andronikos Doukas' son Constantine escaped from his Arab exile and returned to Constantinople, where he was pardoned by Emperor Leo.

Eustathios was then appointed as strategos of the border theme of Charsianon, a position notably inferior in rank to that of the Anatolics that he had held previously. The Argyros family, however, had strong connections with Charsianon, from which it hailed. There he received the return to imperial service of a number of Armenian lords, Melias, the three brothers Baasakios, Krigorikios and Pazounes, and Ismael, who were established as march-wardens along the Empire's eastern border. Of them, Melias in particular would go on to become the founder of the theme of Lykandos and one of the main Byzantine leaders in the wars against the Arabs over the next 30 years.

In late 908 Eustathios Argyros was promoted to the rank of magistros—the highest court dignity open to someone not a member of the imperial family—and the post of Drungary of the Watch, i.e. commander of the imperial bodyguard, and replaced as strategos of Charsianon by Constantine Doukas. About a year later, he fell again under Leo's suspicion, and was ordered to return to his family's estates at Charsianon. Again the reason is unknown; perhaps, according to Cheynet and Vannier, it was a result of the unreliability of the Armenian lords he had welcomed into the Empire, who frequently went over to the Arabs. On the way, he died after taking poison by one of his servants, and was buried on Spynin, the summit of Mount Aran. While historian Romilly James Heald Jenkins has suggested that Argyros' poisoning was done through an agent of the powerful and scheming court eunuch Samonas, it more likely was suicide. His two sons, Pothos and Leo, who served in the palace as manglabites (personal bodyguards of the emperor), arranged to have their father's body transferred for burial to the monastery of Saint Elizabeth in the Charsianon district, founded by Eustathios' father.

== Family ==
Eustathios' sons Pothos and Leo would go on to hold senior military commands, including the post of Domestic of the Schools (commander-in-chief). Another son, Romanos, is known only from his participation in the Battle of Achelous in 917. Leo Argyros married a daughter of Emperor Romanos I Lekapenos (r. 920–944), and was probably the grandfather or great-grandfather of Emperor Romanos III Argyros (r. 1028–1034).

== Identity ==
Some modern scholars like R. J. H. Jenkins (The 'Flight' of Samonas), R. H. Dolley (The Lord High Admiral Eustathios Argyros and the betrayal of Taormina to the African Arabs in 902) and Ekkehard Eickhoff (Seekrieg und Seepolitik zwischen Islam und Abendland) consider Eustathios Argyros to have been identical with the contemporary admiral Eustathios, active in the years before 904, mainly due to the reference by the 11th-century historian John Skylitzes that Argyros pursued a career in the army as well as in the fleet. This identification is rejected by other scholars like J.-F. Vannier (Familles byzantines: les Argyroi (IXe–XIIe siècles)) and R. Guilland (Recherches sur les institutions byzantines). Furthermore, the admiral is given the surname "Argyros" in some modern works that distinguish him from the general, while others reject the surname entirely. According to the Prosopographie der mittelbyzantinischen Zeit, "a definitive decision can no longer be made", and the main argument for the two being different persons is the incompatibility of their careers: the admiral Eustathios likewise experienced a tumultuous career with accusations of treason, rehabilitation, and renewed disgrace, and it is unlikely that such a man would again be entrusted with senior posts.

== Sources ==
- Cheynet, J.-C.; Vannier, J.-F. (2003). "Les Argyroi". Zbornik Radova Vizantološkog Instituta (in French). 40: 57–90. doi:10.2298/ZRVI0340057C. ISSN 0584-9888.
- Guilland, Rodolphe (1957). "Les patrices byzantins sous le règne de Constantin VII Porphyrogénète (913–959)". Studi Bizantini e Neoellenici (in French). 9. Rome: 188–221.
- Guilland, Rodolphe (1967). "Le Drongaire et le Grand drongaire de la Veille". Recherches sur les institutions byzantines [Studies on the Byzantine Institutions]. Berliner byzantinische Arbeiten 35 (in French). Vol. I. Berlin and Amsterdam: Akademie-Verlag & Adolf M. Hakkert. pp. 563–587. OCLC 878894516.
- Lilie, Ralph-Johannes; Ludwig, Claudia; Pratsch, Thomas; Zielke, Beate (2013). Prosopographie der mittelbyzantinischen Zeit Online. Berlin-Brandenburgische Akademie der Wissenschaften. Nach Vorarbeiten F. Winkelmanns erstellt (in German). Berlin and Boston: De Gruyter.
- Tougher, Shaun (1997). The Reign of Leo VI (886-912): Politics and People. Leiden: Brill. ISBN 978-9-00-410811-0.
