= John Mystikos =

Macedonian-era Byzantine politician

John Mystikos (Greek: Ἰωάννης ὁ Μυστικός; fl. ca. 924–946) was a Byzantine official, who served as the chief minister (paradynasteuon) of the empire in the early reign of Romanos I Lekapenos. After being suspected of designs on the throne, he was deposed and sent to exile in a monastery. He eventually recovered a place at court, leading a three-year mission abroad in the 930s, and apparently regained his former high position with the rise of Constantine VII Porphyrogennetos to sole rule in 945. He is last mentioned as leading an embassy to Muhammad ibn Tughj al-Ikhshid in 946.

== Life ==
Nothing is known of his origin or early life. He was apparently named paradynasteuon to Emperor Romanos I Lekapenos (reigned 920–944) sometime between 922 and 924, following the fall of his predecessor, John the Rhaiktor, against whom accusations were brought before the emperor, forcing him to abandon his office and be tonsured a monk. He first appears in this capacity during the negotiations with the Bulgarian Tsar Simeon in 924: he was part of an embassy, along with Patriarch Nicholas I of Constantinople and the patrikios Michael Stypeiotes, that the Bulgarian ruler sent back to Constantinople, demanding to negotiate with Romanos in person.

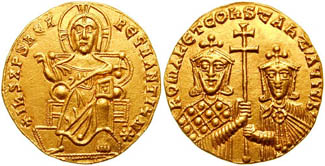
Gold solidus of Romanos I with Constantine VII

John was raised to the high court rank of patrikios kai anthypatos on 19 April 924 or 925, which reportedly caused envy towards him by various courtiers. According to Steven Runciman, the event was possibly connected with the rise of John to greater prominence in the affairs of state, which had hitherto been dominated by the Patriarch Nicholas, whose health was now failing. Although he was trusted and valued by Emperor Romanos I, in October 925, he was accused to the emperor of having designs on the throne, aided by his father-in-law, the logothetes tou dromou Kosmas. Romanos initially refused to believe the accusations, but his rivals managed to collect sufficient proof that John was forced to flee to the Monokastanon Monastery and become a monk along with his friend Constantine Boilas, while his father-in-law was arrested and flogged. The chamberlain Theophanes succeeded him as paradynasteuon.

John's career thereafter is partially recorded in twelve letters exchanged between 927/8 and 945 with Niketas Magistros, likewise a disgraced former high official. Niketas consistently addresses John with the title of "patrikios and mystikos". From these letters it emerges that John eventually re-entered imperial service, abandoning the monastery and re-enrolling in the imperial court as oikonomos. He was sent by Romanos I on a three-year mission as an envoy to unspecified "barbarians", from which he returned some time between 938 and 940. John used his restored rank to successfully lobby for Niketas, securing him an annual stipend (roga).

Following the fall of Romanos I and the restoration of Constantine VII (r. 913–959) to sole imperial power in January 945, John apparently regained his prominent position and influence at court, as indicated by a letter addressed to him by the Metropolitan of Nicaea Alexander, asking for his intervention to secure his recall from exile on the Crimea. According to al-Mas'udi, in 946, when the semi-independent ruler of Egypt and Syria, Muhammad ibn Tughj al-Ikhshid, sent an embassy under Abu Umayr Adi ibn Ahmad al-Adani in order to arrange a truce and a prisoner exchange, John led the Byzantine embassy to al-Ikhshid in response. On the occasion, al-Mas'udi describes John as anthypatos and patrikios, mystikos and a monk. John met al-Ikhshid at Damascus shortly before the latter's death in July 946. The negotiations were continued by Abu al-Misk Kafur, who returned to Egypt. John accompanied him up to Palestine with al-Adani, where he gave them 30,000 gold dinars for the purpose of ransoming prisoners. John and his Arab counterpart then took ship from Tarsus to Constantinople, where an embassy sent by the new ruler of northern Syria, Sayf al-Dawla (r. 945–967) awaited to continue negotiations. The exchange took place in September/October 946 at the Lamos River in Cilicia, in the presence of John and the magistros Kosmas. On the occasion, al-Mas'udi lauds John's erudition and knowledge of the ancient Greek and Roman writers and philosophers. Nothing further is known of him.

== Sources ==
- Lilie, Ralph-Johannes; Ludwig, Claudia; Pratsch, Thomas; Zielke, Beate (2013). Prosopographie der mittelbyzantinischen Zeit Online. Berlin-Brandenburgische Akademie der Wissenschaften. Nach Vorarbeiten F. Winkelmanns erstellt (in German). Berlin and Boston: De Gruyter.
- Runciman, Steven (1988) [1929]. The Emperor Romanus Lecapenus and His Reign: A Study of Tenth-Century Byzantium. Cambridge, United Kingdom: Cambridge University Press. ISBN 0-521-35722-5.
