= Theophanes (chamberlain) =

Theophanes (Greek: Θεοφάνης, fl. ca. 925–945) was a Byzantine palace official and the chief adviser of Emperor Romanos Lekapenos (r. 920–944) during most of his reign. He was also an active and able diplomat, and led the naval defense of Constantinople against the Rus' invasion of 941.

== Biography ==
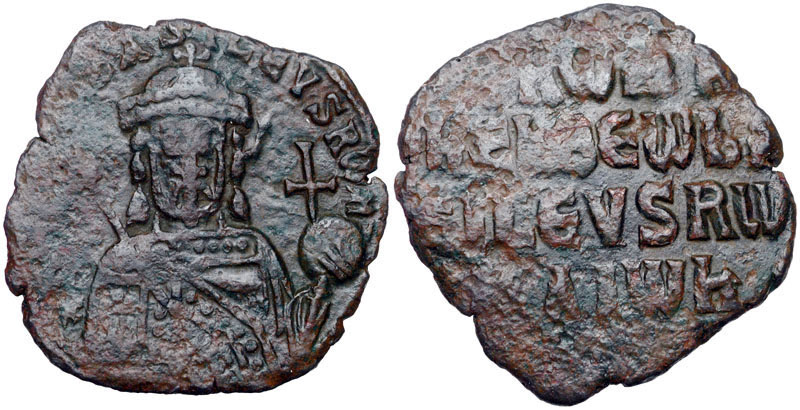
Bronze follis of Emperor Romanos I Lekapenos (r. 920–944).

Nothing is known of Theophanes's origin and early life. He first appears in the sources in October 925, as a protovestiarios in the court of Emperor Romanos I Lekapenos. In that month John Mystikos was dismissed in disgrace, and Theophanes took his place as paradynasteuon, or chief imperial advisor. Unlike Mystikos, he proved both capable and loyal, and remained the chief figure of the government for the remainder of Romanos's reign.

At that time, the Byzantine Empire was embroiled in a protracted and disastrous war with Bulgarian Tsar Simeon (r. 893–927). In 927, however, Simeon died, and his infant son, Peter, ascended the Bulgarian throne under the regency of his uncle George Sursubul. Despite its victories, Bulgaria was exhausted from decades of warfare, and was furthermore threatened in its northern borders by the Magyars. Consequently, the Bulgarians decided to make peace with Constantinople. Negotiations followed at Mesembria, and proved successful: not only was peace agreed upon, but the links between Byzantium and Bulgaria were to be strengthened by a dynastic marriage of Tsar Peter with Maria Lekapene, the Byzantine emperor's granddaughter. Theophanes played a crucial role in the negotiations prior to the final signing of the treaty, and, together with Sursubul, was witness at the wedding of Peter and Maria. Theophanes proved his diplomatic skills yet again in April 934, when a large Magyar raid descended into Thrace. He met the raiders in person and arranged terms for their withdrawal and for the release of their captives in exchange for sums of money.

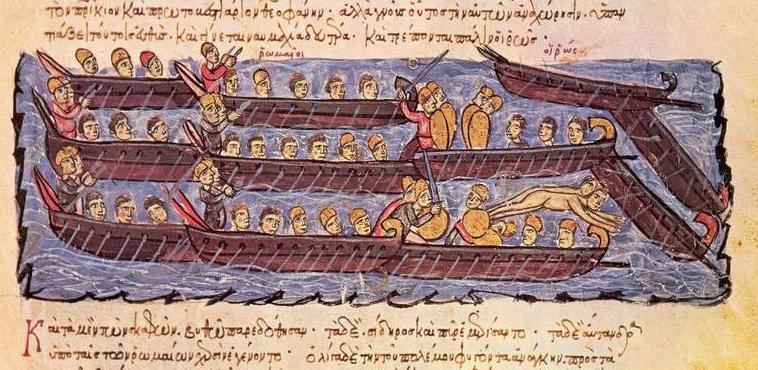
The Byzantine fleet under Theophanes repels the Rus' in 941. Miniature from the Madrid Skylitzes.

Soon, however, Theophanes would have the chance to acquire military glory as well: in early summer 941, the Byzantines received word from Bulgaria that a Rus' fleet of some 1,000 ships was sailing towards the Bosporus and Constantinople. At that point, the Byzantine capital was well-nigh defenceless, for the imperial army was fighting in the east under John Kourkouas and the navy was engaged with the Arabs in the Mediterranean. Fifteen old chelandia were discovered in one of Constantinople's harbours, put in order, outfitted with siphons for the discharge of Greek fire, and placed under the command of Theophanes. The improvised squadron met the Rus' at the entrance of the Bosporus, and through the use of Greek fire, turned them back. The bulk of the raiders then turned east and made landfall in Bithynia, plundering the province. As the local Byzantine forces rallied there and the army began to arrive from the East, the Rus' found themselves increasingly constrained. Trying to evade the Byzantines and return to their homeland, one night in September they tried to cross over into Thrace. Theophanes, however, now placed in command of the entire navy, was vigilant, and the Rus' fleet was annihilated. Theophanes returned in triumph to the Byzantine capital, where he was raised to the post of parakoimomenos as a reward.

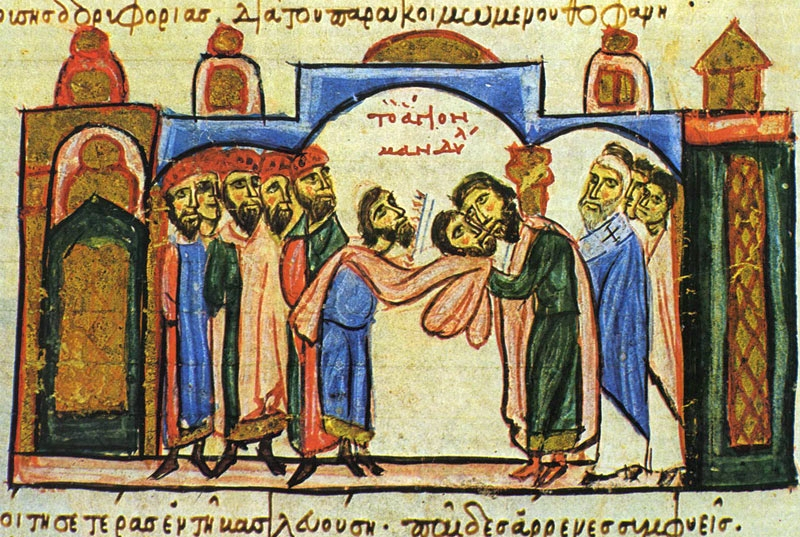
The parakoimomenos Theophanes (right, kissing the image) receives the Mandylion. Miniature from the Madrid Skylitzes.

At the same time, Kourkouas's victories in the East brought not only new territory to the Byzantine Empire: in 944, he forced the city of Edessa to surrender one of the holiest of Christendom's relics, the "Mandylion". Theophanes was sent at the head of the Byzantine delegation to receive it from an Edessene embassy at the river Sagaris, and thence convey it to Constantinople, where it was received with great pomp and ceremony. This triumph, however, was to be the last for Emperor Romanos. His eldest sons and co-emperors, Stephen and Constantine, overthrew him in December 944 and exiled him to the island of Prote. Shortly after, another palace coup deposed them as well, and restored power to the legitimate emperor, Constantine VII. Theophanes was one of the few officials of the previous regime to remain in power; soon, however, he plotted together with the Patriarch of Constantinople Theophylaktos Lekapenos to return Romanos from his exile and restore him to the Byzantine throne. The plot was uncovered sometime in 947, and Theophanes was deposed and exiled. The date and place of his death are unknown.

== Sources ==
- Jenkins, Romilly (1987). Byzantium: The Imperial Centuries, AD 610–1071. Toronto: University of Toronto Press. ISBN 0-8020-6667-4.
- Kazhdan, Alexander (1991). "Theophanes". In Kazhdan, Alexander (ed.). The Oxford Dictionary of Byzantium. Oxford and New York: Oxford University Press. p. 2061. ISBN 0-19-504652-8.
- Runciman, Steven (1988) [1929]. The Emperor Romanus Lecapenus and His Reign: A Study of Tenth-Century Byzantium. Cambridge: Cambridge University Press. ISBN 0-521-35722-5.

Court offices
Unknown Title last held by Constantine Barbaros	Parakoimomenos of the Byzantine emperor 941–947	Succeeded by Basil Lekapenos
