= Psyllium (Bithynia) =

Ancient fortified emporium

Coordinates: 41°08′01″N 29°50′50″E

Psyllium (Ancient Greek: Ψύλλιον or Ψύλλειον), (Note: also written Psyllion, Psylleium, Psillium, Psylleion, Psillion) or Psylla (Ψύλλα) was a fortified emporium on a river of the same name. It was located on the Pontus Euxinus in ancient Bithynia between Artanes and Kalpe. The Tabula Peutingeriana calls it Philium.

Its site is located near Ağva in Asiatic Turkey. Another coastal town with a similar name, Psylla, was located on the coast further to the east, between Crenides and Tium.
