= Crenides =

Crenides or Krenides (Ancient Greek: Κρηνίδες) may refer to:

- Crenides (Bithynia), a town of ancient Bithynia, now in Turkey
- Crenides (Macedonia), a town of ancient Macedonia, Greece
- Crenides (Thrace), a town of ancient Thrace, now in Turkey
