= Battle of Pegae =

921 battle of the Byzantine-Bulgarian Wars

Coordinates: 41.01224°N 28.976018°E

- Part of the Byzantine–Bulgarian wars: War of 913–927
Date	March 921
Location	Pegae, modern village of Balakla, near Constantinople
Result	Bulgarian victory

Belligerents
Bulgarian Empire	Byzantine Empire

Commanders and leaders
Kaukanos; Menikos	Pothos Argyros; Leo Argyros; Alexios Mosele †; John the Rhaiktor

Strength
Large army	Unknown

Casualties and losses
Unknown	Heavy

The Battle of Pegae (Bulgarian: битка при Пиги, Greek: Μάχη των Πηγαίων) was fought between 11 and 18 March 921 in the outskirts of Constantinople between the forces of the Bulgarian Empire and the Byzantine Empire during the Byzantine–Bulgarian war of 913–927. The battle took place in a locality called Pegae (i.e. "the spring"), named after the nearby Church of St. Mary of the Spring. The Byzantine lines collapsed at the very first Bulgarian attack and their commanders fled the battlefield. In the subsequent rout most Byzantine soldiers were killed by the sword, drowned or were captured.

In 922 the Bulgarians continued their successful campaigns in Byzantine Thrace, capturing a number of towns and fortresses, including Adrianople, Thrace's most important city, and Bizye. In June 922 they engaged and defeated yet another Byzantine army at Constantinople, confirming the Bulgarian domination of the Balkans. However, Constantinople itself remained outside their reach, because Bulgaria lacked the naval power to launch a successful siege. The attempts of the Bulgarian emperor Simeon I to negotiate a joint Bulgarian–Arab assault on the city with the Fatimids were uncovered by the Byzantine and countered.

The primary sources for the battle are Theophanes Continuatus, Leo the Grammarian's Chronicle, the continuation of George Hamartolos' Chronicle and John Skylitzes' Synopsis of Histories.

== Origins of the conflict ==
A map of Bulgaria during the rule of Simeon I.

Although the Byzantine–Bulgarian conflict that began in 913 was provoked by the Byzantines, it was the Bulgarian monarch Simeon I (r. 893–927) who was seeking pretext to wage war and fulfil his ambitions to claim an imperial title for himself and to assume the throne of Constantinople. Unable to confront the Bulgarians, the Byzantines reluctantly recognized Simeon I as Emperor of Bulgaria (in Bulgarian, Tsar) as early as July 913 but the decision was revoked after a palace coup in Constantinople in 914. Three years later, in 917, the main Byzantine forces were routed in the Battle of Achelous and the Bulgarians took the military initiative. In the four year that followed they launched a number of successful campaigns, reaching the walls of Constantinople and the Isthmus of Corinth.

Simeon I planned to secure his position in Constantinople through a marriage between his daughter and the infant Emperor Constantine VII (r. 913–959), thus becoming basileopator (father-in-law) and guardian of Constantine VII. However, in 919 Admiral Romanos Lekapenos married his daughter to Constantine VII and in 920 proclaimed himself senior emperor, ruining Simeon I's ambitions to ascend the throne by diplomatic means. Until his death, the Bulgarian monarch never recognized the legitimacy of Romanos' accession to the throne. Thus, in the beginning of 921 Simeon I did not reply to a proposal of the Ecumenical Patriarch Nicholas Mystikos to betroth one of his daughters or sons to a progeny of Romanos I and sent his army into Byzantine Thrace, reaching Katasyrtai in the outskirts of Constantinople. Romanos I retaliated with a campaign under Pothos Argyros, who reached the town of Aquae Calidae, near modern Burgas, but part of his army was ambushed and destroyed by the Bulgarians.

== Battle ==
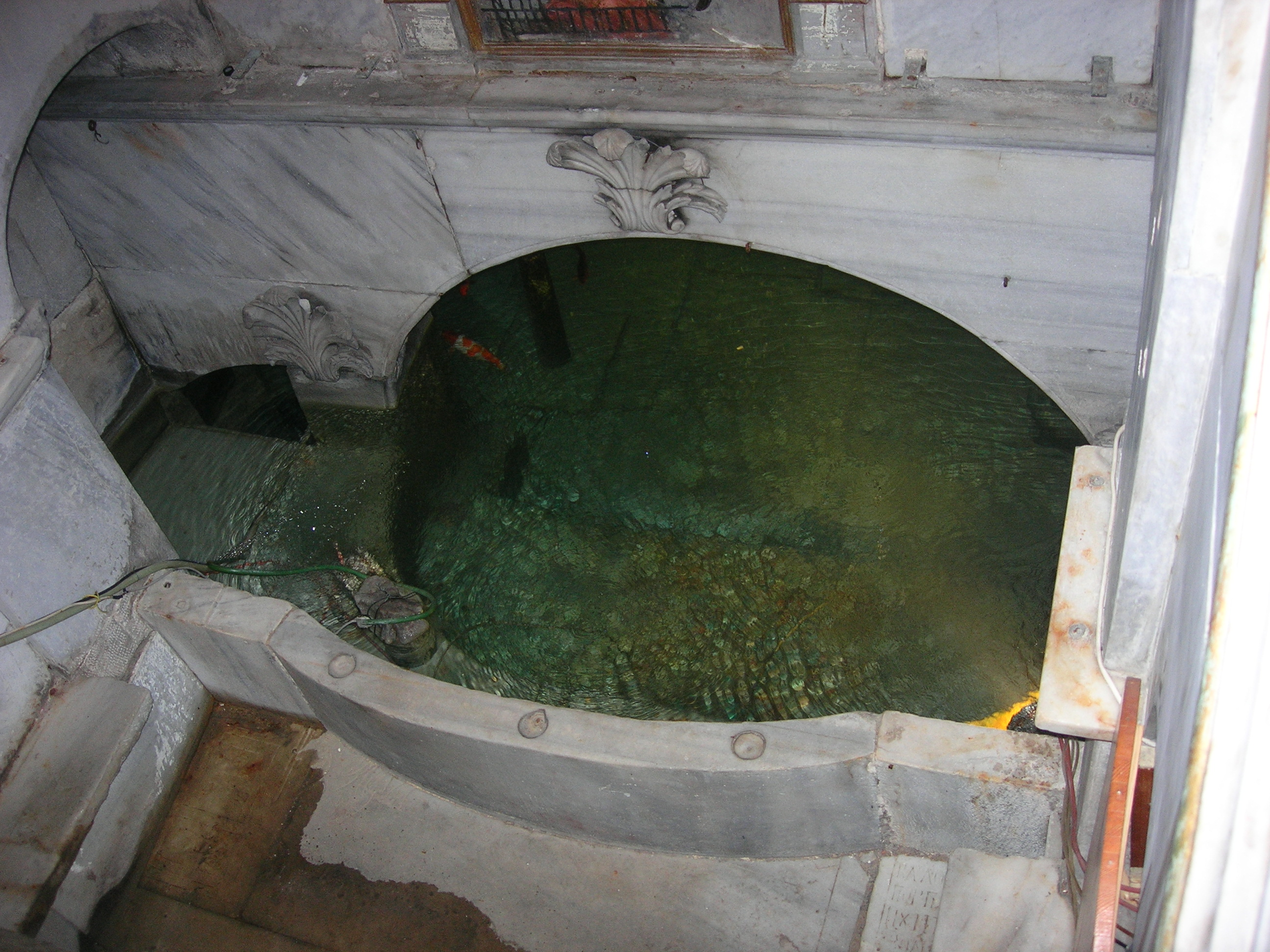
A view of the spring at Pegae

The Byzantine campaign to Aquae Calidae and the threat in a letter by Nicholas Mystikos that numerous Byzantine troops were preparing to invade Bulgaria caused Simeon I to act quickly. He ordered a large army under Kaukanos and Menikos to head for Constantinople while he himself made preparations to take his main army to besiege the capital of the Theme of Thrace, Adrianople.

The army commanded by Kaukanos and Menikos marched swiftly through the Strandzha Mountains and reached the locality of Pegae (i.e. "the spring") at the outskirts of Constantinople at the beginning of March 921. Romanos I was concerned that the Bulgarians would burn the palaces in Pegae and responded by sending "sufficient troops" under the Domestic of the Schools Pothos Argyros, his brother Leo Argyros, the admiral Alexios Mosele and John the Rhaiktor. The Byzantine army was composed of troops of the tagmata, the Hetaireia (i.e. the imperial guard) and the navy.

The two armies clashed at Pegae during the fifth week of Great Lent, between 11 and 18 March 921. The Byzantine commanders formed their battle lines in the lowlands near the springs, while the Bulgarians occupied the higher ground. The Bulgarians charged with a dreadful battle cry. Their initial blow was irresistible and the Byzantine lines broke. John the Rhaiktor immediately fled while many of his soldiers were killed fighting to protect his escape. John the Rhaiktor ultimately escaped aboard a dromon. Alexios Mosele, who fled in full armour, drowned with his protomandator while attempting to board a ship. The brothers Pothos and Leo Argyros managed to find shelter in a nearby fortress. In the subsequent rout, most of the Byzantine soldiers were killed by the sword, drowned or were captured by the Bulgarians. After the battle, the Bulgarians burned the palaces in Pegae and looted the area north of the Golden Horn waterway on the opposite shore of the walls of Constantinople.

== Aftermath ==
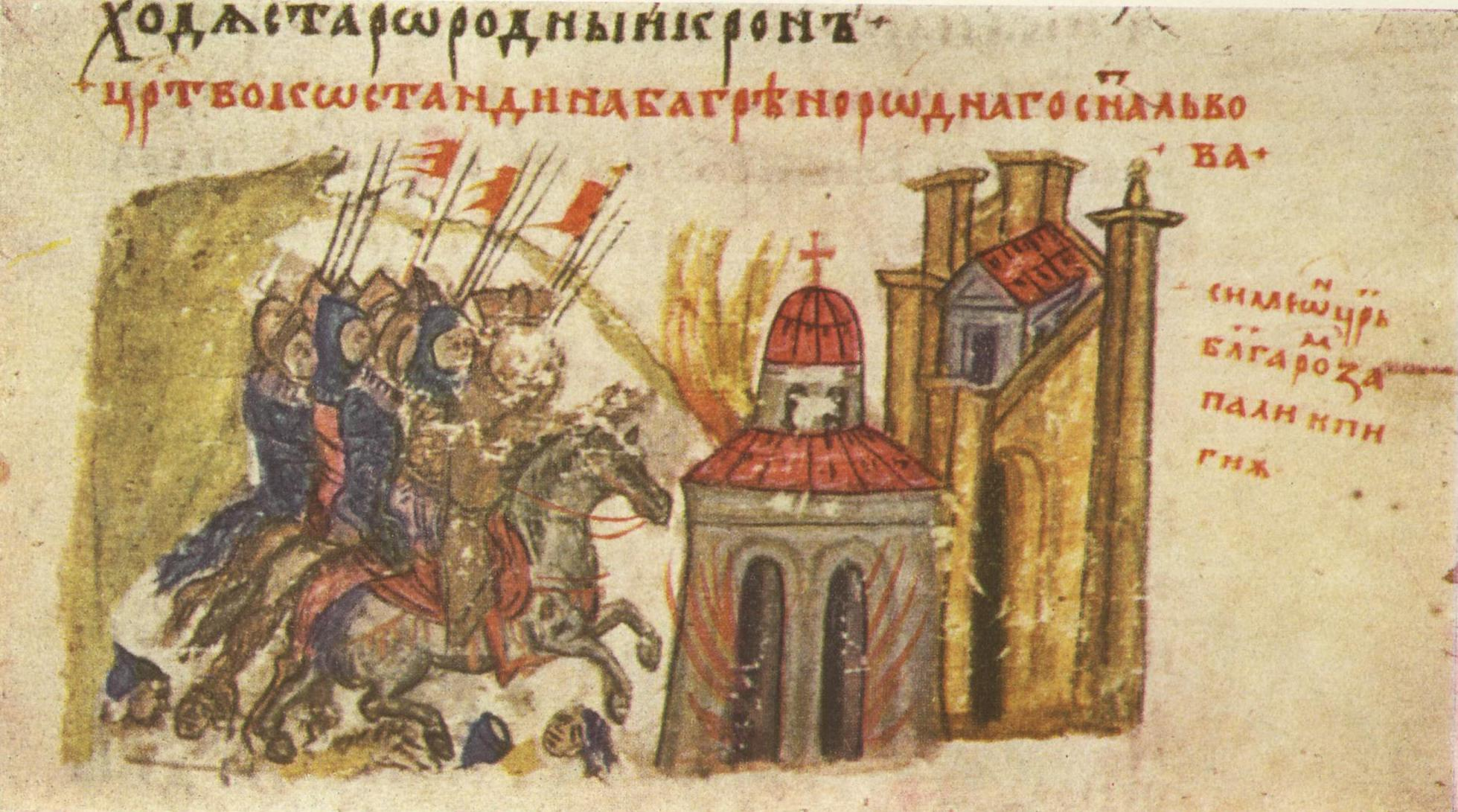
The Bulgarians burn the Church of St. Mary of the Spring, Manasses Chronicle

While the Bulgarian army operated successfully in the vicinity of Constantinople, Simeon I was preparing another major campaign in Thrace. Before leaving the capital, Preslav, Simeon I sent a letter to Patriarch Nicholas Mystikos in which he rebuffed the proposal for a dynastic marriage with the family of Romanos I. He insisted that peace was only possible on condition that Romanos I renounce the Byzantine throne in favour of himself. The Bulgarian monarch denied the accusations of Mystikos that he was responsible for the terrible war and instead blamed the eunuchs of Empress Zoe Karbonopsina, who had rebuffed his proposal to betroth his daughter to Constantine VII in 914 and had attacked Bulgaria in 917.

At the head of his army, Simeon I marched from Preslav through the Balkan Mountains and the valley of the river Tundzha and besieged Adrianople. While the bulk of the Bulgarian forces were concentrated in Thrace, the Byzantines bribed the Serbian prince Pavle Branović, who was a Bulgarian protégé, to switch sides. The Bulgarians answered with a successful intervention in Serbia, easily gained control of the country and placed in power another Bulgarian candidate, Zaharija Pribisavljević. The conflict in Serbia distracted the Bulgarian military operations against the Byzantine Empire for the rest of 921.

In 922, the Bulgarians renewed their offensive in Thrace to divert the Byzantines from the clandestine negotiations with the Fatimid Caliphate to form a Bulgarian–Arab alliance for a joint assault of Constantinople. Simeon I remained at the siege of Adrianople while another army was sent to the Byzantine capital. In June 922, the Bulgarians engaged and defeated yet another Byzantine army at the Battle of Constantinople. A few weeks later, Adrianople surrendered. In the meantime, the Byzantines captured the ship with the Bulgarian and Fatimid envoys on its way back to Bulgaria. Romanos I thus learned about the negotiations and outbid the Bulgarians.

== Sources ==
- Андреев (Andreev), Йордан (Jordan); Лалков (Lalkov), Милчо (Milcho) (1996). Българските ханове и царе (The Bulgarian Khans and Tsars) (in Bulgarian). Велико Търново (Veliko Tarnovo): Абагар (Abagar). ISBN 954-427-216-X.
- Колектив (Collective) (1964). "11. Продължителят на Теофан (11. Theophanis Continuati)". Гръцки извори за българската история (ГИБИ), том V (Greek Sources for Bulgarian History (GIBI), volume V) (in Bulgarian and Greek). София (Sofia): Издателство на БАН (Bulgarian Academy of Sciences Press).
- Колектив (Collective) (1965). Гръцки извори за българската история (ГИБИ), том VI (Greek Sources for Bulgarian History (GIBI), volume VI) (in Bulgarian and Greek). София (Sofia): Издателство на БАН (Bulgarian Academy of Sciences Press).
- Fine, John V. A. Jr. (1991) [1983]. The Early Medieval Balkans: A Critical Survey from the Sixth to the Late Twelfth Century. Ann Arbor: University of Michigan Press. ISBN 0-472-08149-7.
- Златарски (Zlatarski), Васил (Vasil) (1972) [1927]. История на българската държава през средните векове. Том I. История на Първото българско царство. (History of the Bulgarian state in the Middle Ages. Volume I. History of the First Bulgarian Empire.) (in Bulgarian) (2 ed.). София (Sofia): Наука и изкуство (Nauka i izkustvo). OCLC 67080314.
- Lilie, Ralph-Johannes; Ludwig, Claudia; Pratsch, Thomas; Zielke, Beate (2013). Prosopographie der mittelbyzantinischen Zeit Online. Berlin-Brandenburgische Akademie der Wissenschaften. Nach Vorarbeiten F. Winkelmanns erstellt (in German). Berlin and Boston: De Gruyter.
