= Battle of Constantinople (922) =

Successful siege of Constantinople in 922

Coordinates: 41°02′N 28°56′E

- Part of the Byzantine–Bulgarian wars: War of 913–927
| Date | June 922 |
| Location | Constantinople, Thrace |
| Result | Bulgarian victory |

Belligerents
| First Bulgarian Empire | Byzantine Empire |

Commanders and leaders
| Unknown | Saktikios † |

Strength
| Unknown | Unknown, assumed equal |

Casualties and losses
| Medium | Very high |

The battle of Constantinople was fought in June 922 at the outskirts of the capital of the Byzantine Empire, Constantinople, between the forces of the First Bulgarian Empire and the Byzantines during the Byzantine–Bulgarian war of 913–927. In the summer the Byzantine Emperor Romanos I Lekapenos sent troops under the commander Saktikios to repel another Bulgarian raid at the outskirts of the Byzantine capital. The Byzantines stormed the Bulgarian camp but were defeated when they confronted the main Bulgarian forces. During his flight from the battlefield Saktikios was mortally wounded and died the following night.

The Bulgarians, who by 922 were in control of most of the Balkans, continued to ravage the Byzantine countryside virtually unopposed. However, they lacked the maritime power to conduct a successful siege of Constantinople. The subsequent attempts to negotiate a Bulgarian–Arab alliance for a joint assault of Constantinople were discovered by the Byzantines and successfully countered. The strategic situation in the Balkans remained unchanged until both sides signed a peace treaty in 927, which recognized the imperial title of the Bulgarian monarchs and the complete independence of the Bulgarian Orthodox Church as an autocephalous Patriarchate.

The primary sources for the battle are the continuation of George Hamartolos' Chronicle and John Skylitzes' Synopsis of Histories.

== Background ==
During his short reign the Byzantine emperor Alexander (r. 912–913) provoked a conflict with the Bulgarian monarch Simeon I (r. 893–927). Simeon I, who had long harboured ambitions to claim an imperial title for himself, took the opportunity to wage war. With the Byzantine Empire in disarray following Alexander's death in June 913, the Bulgarians reached Constantinople unopposed and forced the regency of the infant Constantine VII (r. 913–959) to recognize Simeon I as emperor (in Bulgarian, Tsar). Following a palace coup in 914, the new Byzantine regency revoked the concessions to the Bulgarians and summoned the whole army, including the troops in Asia Minor, to deal with the Bulgarian threat once and all. In the decisive battle of Achelous in 917 the Byzantine forces were completely annihilated, leaving the Bulgarians in charge of the Balkans. Their annual campaigns reached the walls of Constantinople and the Isthmus of Corinth. All subsequent attempts to confront the Bulgarian army at Katasyrtai, Aquae Calidae and Pegae ended in defeat.

Despite his military supremacy over land, Simeon I was aware that he needed naval assistance in order to seize Constantinople. In 922 he clandestinely sent envoys to the Fatimid caliph Ubayd Allah al-Mahdi Billah in Mahdia to negotiate the assistance of the powerful Arab navy. Simeon I proposed to divide equally all spoils; the Bulgarians were to keep Constantinople and the Fatimids would gain the Byzantine territories in Sicily and Southern Italy.

== The battle ==
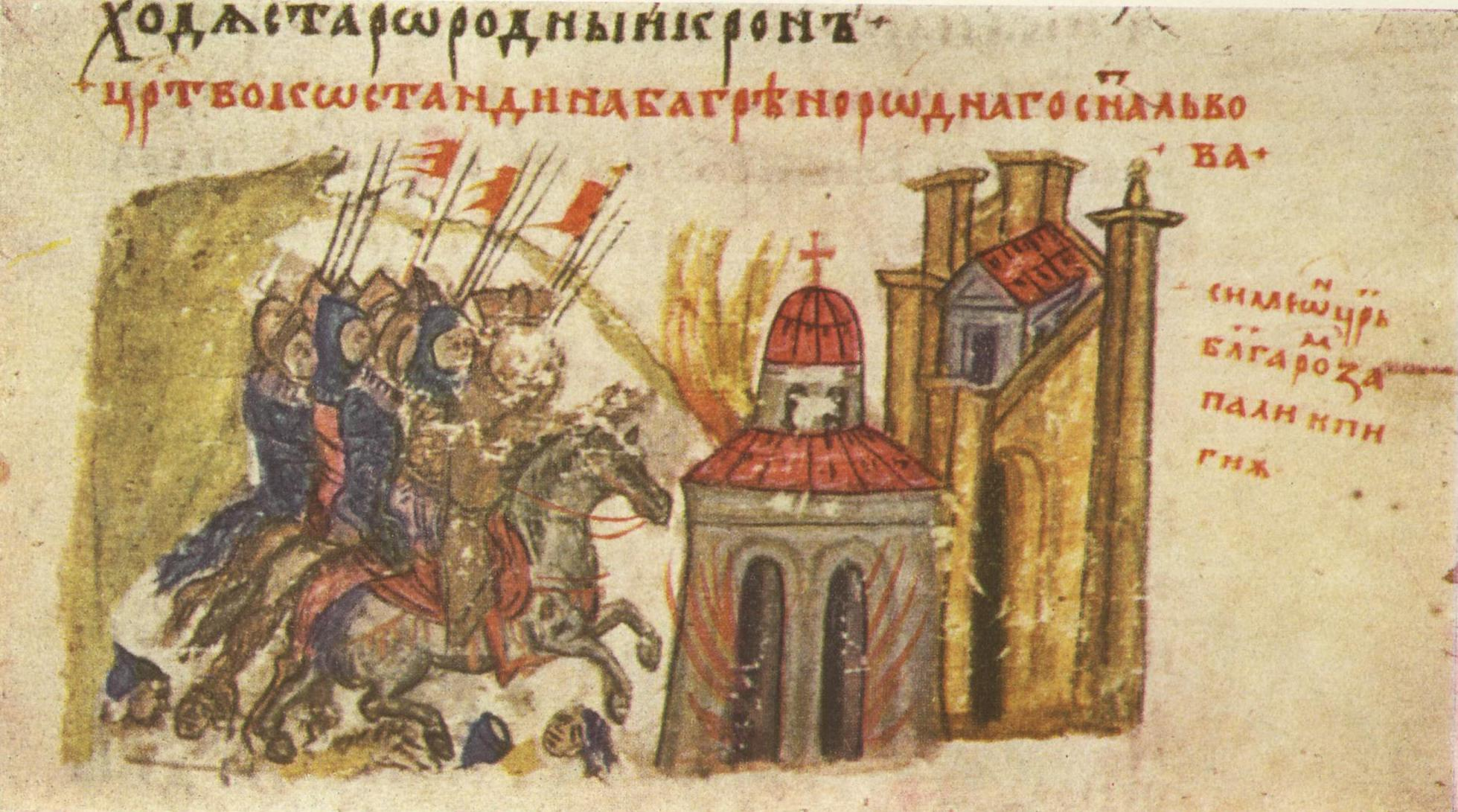
The Bulgarians burn a church at the outskirts of Constantinople, Manasses Chronicle.

To distract the Byzantine attention from the secret negotiations with the Arabs, in the summer of 922 the Bulgarians launched a campaign in Eastern Thrace. They captured and garrisoned a number of fortified towns in the region, including Bizye. In June they reached the outskirts of Constantinople and burned the Palace of Theodora, situated on the shores of the Golden Horn.

In response, emperor Romanos I Lekapenos (r. 920–944) summoned the commanders of the tagmata on a feast and urged them to confront the Bulgarians. The following day one of them, Saktikios, led the assault against the Bulgarians. While most of the Bulgarian soldiers were dispersed to loot the countryside, the Byzantines attacked the Bulgarian camp and slaughtered the few defenders left there. When the main Bulgarian forces were informed about the attack, they headed back to the camp to engage the opponents. In the ensuing heavy struggle the Bulgarians prevailed and forced the Byzantines to flee despite the personal courage of Saktikios, who the Byzantine chroniclers claim to have "killed many". During the flight, the horse of Saktikios got stuck in the mud of a river and the Byzantine commander was wounded in the seat and the thigh. His soldiers managed to free the horse from the mud and to bring him to the Blachernae alive. Saktikios was laid in the Church of St. Mary of Blachernae, where he died the following night.

== Aftermath ==
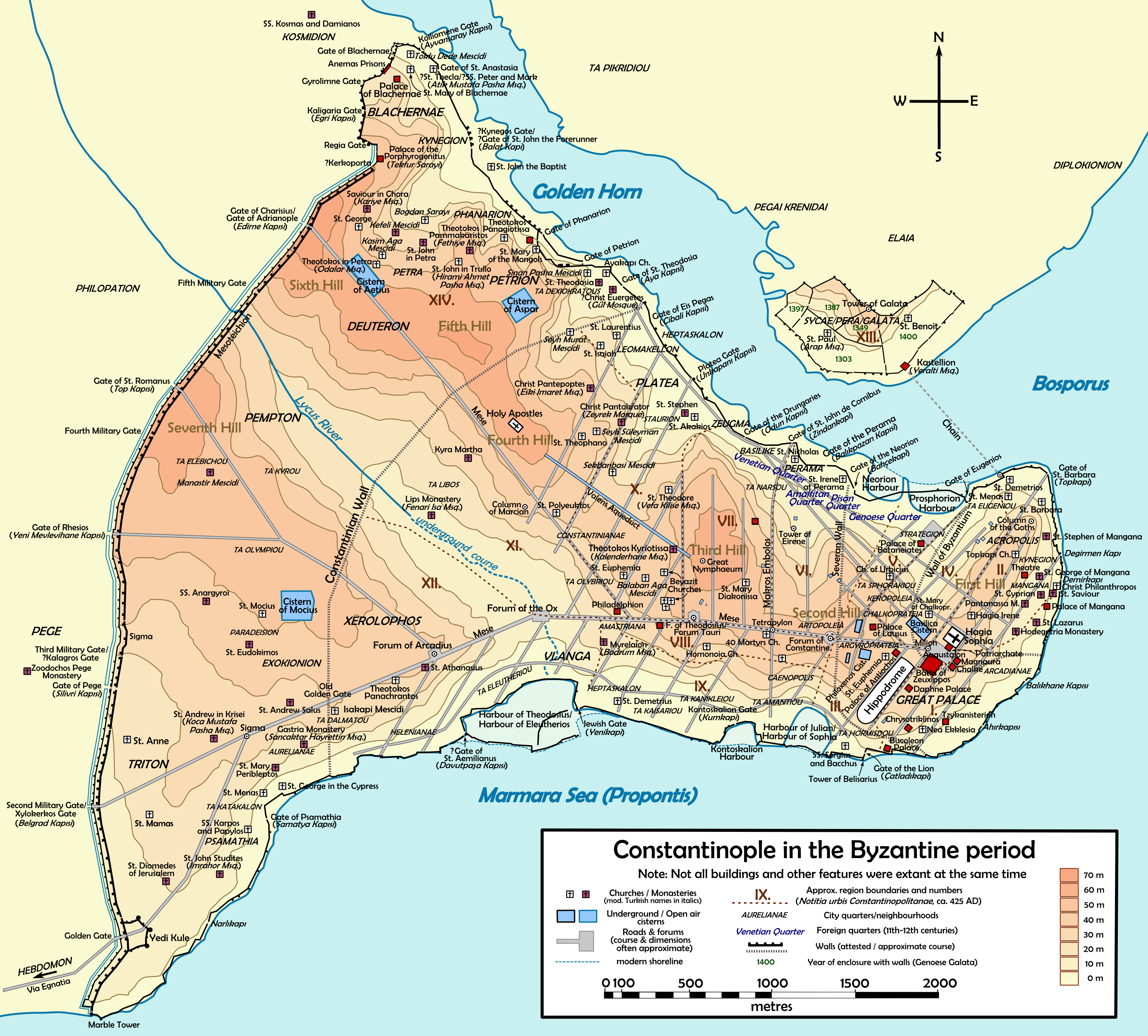
A map of Constantinople with the Golden Horn visible to the north and the Blachernae to the north-west.

After the victory Simeon I sent letters to the Ecumenical Patriarch Nicholas Mystikos and Romanos' co-emperor Constantine VII to propose peace negotiations. However, his intention was to prolong the negotiations until the return of his envoys to the Fatimids. While Simeon I and Nicholas Mystikos exchanged letters the military actions continued. In a few weeks the Bulgarian army captured Adrianople, the most important city in Byzantine Thrace. The fall of Adrianople raised fears in Constantinople that a Bulgarian assault of the city was imminent. The Byzantines tried to intimidate Simeon I by threatening to incite the Magyars, the Pechenegs and Kievan Rus' to attack Bulgaria from the north-east, as they had done in the war of 894–896. Simeon I knew that these were empty words because the Byzantine Empire was in no position to carry out these threats.

In the meantime, the Bulgarian envoys received a warm welcome by al-Mahdi. The Fatimid caliph accepted the Bulgarian terms and sent his own emissaries to Simeon I. However, on the way back their ship was captured by the Byzantines, who managed to outbid the Bulgarians and distract a Fatimid attack. The Bulgarians remained in control of most of the Balkans, annexing Byzantium's ally Serbia in 924, but without naval support were unable to launch a decisive attack on Constantinople. The war continued until the death of Simeon I in 927, when his son Peter I (r. 927–969) concluded a peace treaty with the Byzantines, who recognized the imperial title of the Bulgarian monarchs and the complete independence of the Bulgarian Orthodox Church as an autocephalous Patriarchate in return for most of Simeon I's conquests in Thrace after 917.

== See also ==
- Byzantine–Bulgarian wars
- First Bulgarian Empire
- Medieval Bulgarian army
- Byzantine army

== Notes ==
a: Although after 919 Romanos I Lekapenos had assumed absolute power in the Byzantine Empire and Constantine VII had become a figurehead, Simeon I addressed his letter to Constantine VII because he considered Romanos I a usurper.

== Sources ==
- Andreev, Iordan; Lalkov, Milcho (1996). Българските ханове и царе [The Bulgarian Khans and Tsars] (in Bulgarian). Veliko Tarnovo: Абагар. ISBN 954-427-216-X.
- Колектив (Collective) (1965). Гръцки извори за българската история (ГИБИ), том VI [Greek Sources for Bulgarian History (GIBI), volume VI] (in Bulgarian and Greek). Sofia: Bulgarian Academy of Sciences Press.
- Fine, John V. A. Jr. (1991) [1983]. The Early Medieval Balkans: A Critical Survey from the Sixth to the Late Twelfth Century. Ann Arbor: University of Michigan Press. ISBN 0-472-08149-7.
- Zlatarski, Vasil (1972) [1927]. История на българската държава през средните векове. Том I. История на Първото българско царство [History of the Bulgarian state in the Middle Ages. Volume I. History of the First Bulgarian Empire.] (in Bulgarian) (2 ed.). Sofia: Наука и изкуство. OCLC 67080314.
