= Rhaiktor =

Byzantine Empire court position

For the attempted Byzantine usurper, see Raiktor

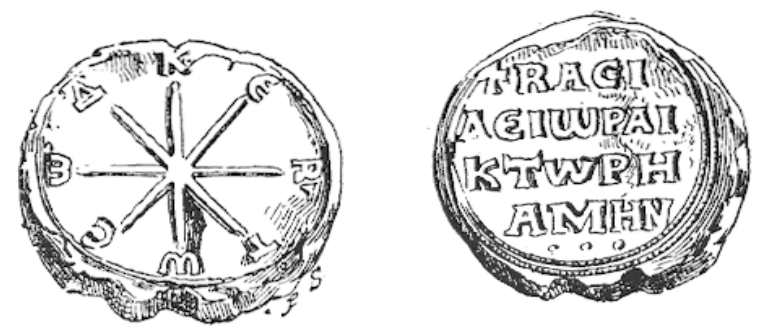
Seal of an 11th-century rhaiktor Basil. Legend: K[ΥΡΙ]E B[ΟΗΘΕΙ] TΩ CΩ Δ[ΟΥΛΩ] / ΒΑCΙΛΕΙΩ ΡΑΙΚΤΩΡΙ ΑΜΗΝ.

The rhaiktor (Medieval Greek: ῥαίκτωρ, the Hellenized form of Latin: rector) was a high-ranking court position of the middle Byzantine Empire.

== History and functions ==
J. B. Bury assumed that the post was created either under Leo VI the Wise (r. 886–912) or his father Basil I the Macedonian (r. 867–886), but Nicolas Oikonomides restored it in the text of the Taktikon Uspensky of c. 843. The title is also found in seals of the 7th and 8th centuries, but with a different sense; thus a "rhaiktor of Calabria" was the administrator of the local estates of the See of Rome in Calabria.

The Kletorologion of 899 includes the rhaiktor among the 'special dignities' (axiai eidikai). The exact functions of the office are not clear, but, as J. B. Bury wrote, they probably "consisted in exercising some authority over the Imperial household". Earlier authors suggested that the title was related, or even identical, to the later title of proedros, but the theory was rejected by Rodolphe Guilland. His ceremony of appointment is recorded in Constantine VII's De Ceremoniis. The reports of the ambassador to the Byzantine court Liutprand of Cremona show the rhaiktor as playing an important role in court ceremonies under Constantine VII.

The post could be held by court eunuchs as well as clerics, even priests, but was also often combined with other high offices, such as stratopedarches or logothetes tou genikou. In the lists of precedence to the imperial banquets of the 9th–10th centuries he occupied a very prominent place, coming right after the magistroi and before the synkellos and the patrikioi. The title disappears from the sources after the reign of Constantine IX Monomachos (r. 1042–1055).

At the same time, the title also appears as a family name: the magistros and logothetes tou dromou Michael Rhektor was a member of the regency council appointed on the death of Romanos II in 963, while under Nikephoros III (r. 1078–1081) a monk called Rhektor pretended to be Michael VII Doukas (r. 1071–1078) and tried to overthrow the emperor.

== List of known rhaiktores ==
Name	Tenure	Appointed by	Notes	Refs
John Lazares	912–913	Alexander	Raised to the post on the accession of Alexander, he became a member of the regency council for Constantine VII but was soon dismissed by Empress-regent Zoe Karbonopsina.	
John the Rhaiktor	c. 922	Romanos I Lekapenos	A cleric, he was rhaiktor and paradynasteuon of Romanos, he was forced to retire to a monastery. He led a diplomatic mission to Bulgaria c. 929, and was blinded and exiled along with others in 946 for plotting against Constantine VII.	
Michael Lekapenos	after 945	Constantine VII	Son of Romanos I's eldest son and co-emperor Christopher Lekapenos, according to Theophanes Continuatus he was named magistros and rhaiktor by Constantine VII.	
Basil	c. 970	John I Tzimiskes	Was instrumental in suppressing a coup attempt by Leo Phokas the Younger against Tzimiskes and arresting the ringleaders. Possibly to be identified with Basil Lekapenos.	
Basil	c. 993	Basil II	Recorded only in two acts of the Great Lavra monastery as rhaiktor and genikos logothetes.	
Niketas	c. 1035 (?)	unknown	Only mentioned briefly in the Peira of Eustathios Rhomaios.	
Sagmatas	later 11th century	unknown	Addressee of a letter of Michael Psellos, later apparently advanced to the posts of synkellos and logothetes tou dromou.	
Nikephoros	c. 1050	Constantine IX Monomachos	A eunuch and former monk, he became a court favourite of Constantine IX, who named him rhaiktor and stratopedarches. Sent to command against the Pechenegs, he was heavily defeated in battle near the Iron Gates.	

== Sources ==
- Bury, J. B. (1911). The Imperial Administrative System of the Ninth Century – With a Revised Text of the Kletorologion of Philotheos. London: Oxford University Press. OCLC 1046639111.
- Guilland, Rodolphe (1967). "Le Recteur". Recherches sur les institutions byzantines [Studies on the Byzantine Institutions]. Berliner byzantinische Arbeiten 35 (in French). Vol. 2. Berlin and Amsterdam: Akademie-Verlag & Adolf M. Hakkert. pp. 212–219. OCLC 878894516.
- Kazhdan, Alexander (1991). "Rhaiktor". In Kazhdan, Alexander (ed.). The Oxford Dictionary of Byzantium. Oxford and New York: Oxford University Press. pp. 1787–1788. ISBN 0-19-504652-8.
- Lilie, Ralph-Johannes; Ludwig, Claudia; Pratsch, Thomas; Zielke, Beate (2013). Prosopographie der mittelbyzantinischen Zeit Online. Berlin-Brandenburgische Akademie der Wissenschaften. Nach Vorarbeiten F. Winkelmanns erstellt (in German). Berlin and Boston: De Gruyter.
- Oikonomides, Nicolas (1972). Les listes de préséance byzantines des IXe et Xe siècles (in French). Paris: Editions du Centre national de la recherche scientifique.
