= Pothos Argyros (Domestic of the Schools) =

Pothos Argyros (Greek: Πόθος Ἀργυρός; fl. c. 910 – after 958) was a Byzantine general active in the first half of the 10th century.

== Early life ==
He was the eldest son of the magistros Eustathios Argyros, Drungary of the Watch under Leo VI the Wise (ruled 886–912). He had two brothers, Leo and Romanos. In ca. 910, Pothos and his brother Leo Argyros were serving at court as manglabites (personal bodyguards of the emperor), when their father was poisoned after being suspected by Leo of plotting against him. The two brothers brought their father's body for burial to the monastery of Saint Elizabeth in the Charsianon district, founded by their grandfather Leo Argyros. Accordingly, he was born probably ca. 890 or a little later.

== Military career ==
Pothos and Leo both followed military careers and reached high office. In ca. 921 Pothos was appointed to the post of Domestic of the Schools by Romanos I (r. 920–944) in succession to Adralestos, who had died recently. A "most handsome and experienced man", according to Theophanes Continuatus, he was sent to counter a Bulgarian invasion into Thrace during the Byzantine–Bulgarian war of 913–927. Pothos led the tagmata of the capital to meet them. Still, a scouting detachment under a certain Michael was ambushed and annihilated. In 922 Pothos was sent to meet another Bulgarian incursion, that had reached Pegae, a suburb of Constantinople. Pothos and John the Rhaiktor commanded the tagmata and the Hetaireia forces, along with fleet elements under Alexios Mosele. The Byzantine army suffered a crushing defeat at the Battle of Pegae in early April 922, losing many dead and captives. Pothos and his brother however managed to escape and find refuge in a nearby fort, while the Bulgarians plundered and burned down the imperial palaces at Pegaea and Stenon. This disaster evidently spelled the end of Pothos' career as Domestic, of whom nothing further is heard during Romanos I's reign.

It is possible, however, that he is to be identified with the strategos of Hellas Pothos, who served in the late 940s. A man of the same name, holding the rank of patrikios and the post of Domestic of the Excubitors, is attested in 958, when he defeated a Magyar raid that had reached the vicinity of Constantinople on 11 April. While some scholars consider the two men to be identical, the prosopographical experts J.-C. Cheynet and J.-F. Vannier regard it unlikely, given that in 921, Pothos' brother was old enough to have a son of marriageable age, and suggest that the commander of 958 was another member of the family, likely the grandson of either Leo or Pothos.

== Sources ==
- Cheynet, J.-C.; Vannier, J.-F. (2003). "Les Argyroi". Zbornik Radova Vizantološkog Instituta (in French). 40: 57–90. doi:10.2298/ZRVI0340057C. ISSN 0584-9888.
- Lilie, Ralph-Johannes; Ludwig, Claudia; Pratsch, Thomas; Zielke, Beate (2013). Prosopographie der mittelbyzantinischen Zeit Online. Berlin-Brandenburgische Akademie der Wissenschaften. Nach Vorarbeiten F. Winkelmanns erstellt (in German). Berlin and Boston: De Gruyter.
- Tougher, Shaun (1997). The Reign of Leo VI (886-912): Politics and People. Leiden; New York; Köln: Brill. ISBN 9004108114.

Preceded by Adralestos	Domestic of the Schools; 920/1–922	Succeeded by John Kourkouas
