= Byzantine–Bulgarian war of 913–927 =

War between the Byzantine Empire and the First Bulgarian Empire

- Part of the Byzantine–Bulgarian wars Bulgarian–Serbian wars
Date	913–927
Location	Balkan Peninsula
Result	Bulgarian victory; (see § Aftermath)
Territorial changes	Serbia & parts of Greece and Thrace are annexed by Bulgaria

Belligerents
Bulgarian Empire	Byzantine Empire; Principality of Serbia

Commanders and leaders
Simeon I the Great; Peter I; George Sursuvul; Theodore Sigritsa; Marmais	Constantine VII; Romanos I Lekapenos; Zoe Karbonopsina; Nicholas Mystikos; Leo Phokas the Elder; Petar Gojniković; Pavle Branović; Zaharija Pribisavljević

The Bulgarian Empire and the Byzantine Empire fought a war from 913 until 927. Although the war was provoked by the Byzantine emperor Alexander's decision to discontinue paying an annual tribute to Bulgaria, the military and ideological initiative was held by Simeon I of Bulgaria, who demanded to be recognized as tsar and made it clear that he aimed to conquer not only Constantinople but the rest of the Byzantine Empire as well.

In 917, the Bulgarian army dealt a crushing defeat to the Byzantines at the Battle of Achelous, resulting in Bulgaria's total military supremacy in the Balkans. The Bulgarians again defeated the Byzantines at Katasyrtai in 917, Pegae in 921 and Constantinople in 922. The Bulgarians also captured the important city of Adrianople in Thrace and seized Thebes, capital of the Theme of Hellas, deep in southern Greece. Following the disaster at Achelous, Byzantine diplomacy incited the Principality of Serbia to attack Bulgaria from the west, but this assault was easily contained. In 924, the Serbs ambushed and defeated a small Bulgarian army on its way to Serbia, provoking a major retaliatory campaign that ended with Bulgaria's annexation of Serbia at the end of that year.

Simeon was aware that he needed naval support to conquer Constantinople and in 922 sent envoys to the Fatimid caliph Ubayd Allah al-Mahdi Billah in Mahdia to negotiate the assistance of the powerful Arab navy. The caliph agreed to send his own representatives to Bulgaria to arrange an alliance but his envoys were captured en route by the Byzantines near the Calabrian coast. Emperor Romanos I Lekapenos managed to avert a Bulgarian–Arab alliance by showering the Arabs with generous gifts. By the time of his death in May 927, Simeon controlled almost all Byzantine possessions in the Balkans, but Constantinople remained out of his reach.

In 927, both countries were exhausted by the huge military efforts that had taken a heavy toll on the population and economy. Simeon's successor Peter negotiated a favourable peace treaty. The Byzantines agreed to recognize him as emperor of Bulgaria and the Bulgarian Orthodox Church as an independent patriarchate, as well as to pay an annual tribute. The peace was reinforced with a marriage between Peter and Romanos's granddaughter Irene Lekapene. This agreement ushered in a period of 40 years of peaceful relations between the two powers, a time of stability and prosperity for both Bulgaria and the Byzantine Empire.

== Prelude ==
=== Political background ===
In the first years after his accession to the throne in 893, Simeon successfully defended Bulgaria's commercial interests, acquired territory between the Black Sea and the Strandzha mountains, and imposed an annual tribute on the Byzantine Empire as a result of the Byzantine–Bulgarian war of 894–896. The outcome of the war confirmed Bulgarian domination in the Balkans, but Simeon knew that he needed to consolidate his political, cultural and ideological base in order to fulfil his ultimate goal of claiming an imperial title for himself and eventually assuming the throne in Constantinople. He implemented an ambitious construction programme in Bulgaria's new capital, Preslav, so that the city would rival the splendour of the Byzantine capital. Simeon continued the policy of his father Boris I (r. 852–889) of establishing and disseminating Bulgarian culture, turning the country into the literary and spiritual centre of Slavic Europe. The Preslav and literary schools, founded under Boris I, reached their apogee during the reign of his successor. It was at this time that the Cyrillic alphabet was invented, most likely by the Bulgarian scholar Clement of Ohrid.

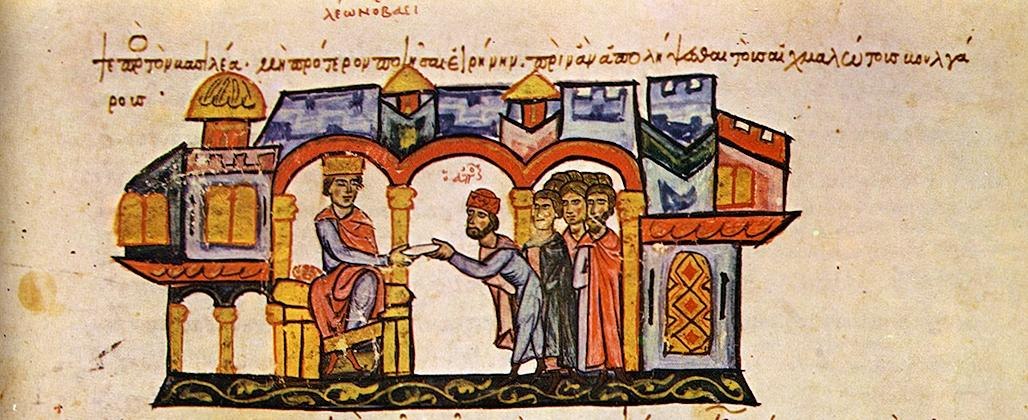
A Bulgarian delegation and Leo VI, Madrid Skylitzes

The Magyar devastation of the country's north-eastern regions during the War of 894–896 exposed the vulnerability of Bulgaria's borders to foreign intervention under the influence of Byzantine diplomacy. As soon as the peace with Byzantium had been signed, Simeon sought to secure the Bulgarian positions in the western Balkans. After the death of the Serb prince Mutimir (r. 850–891), several members of the ruling dynasty fought over the throne of the Principality of Serbia until Petar Gojniković established himself as a prince in 892. In 897 Simeon agreed to recognize Petar and put him under his protection, resulting in a twenty-year period of peace and stability to the west. However, Petar was not content with his subordinate position and sought ways to achieve independence.

The internal situation of the Byzantine Empire at the beginning of the 10th century was seen by Simeon as a sign of weakness. There was an attempt to murder emperor Leo VI the Wise (r. 886–912) in 903 and a rebellion of the commander of the Eastern army Andronikos Doukas in 905. The situation further deteriorated as the emperor entered into a feud with the Ecumenical Patriarch Nicholas Mystikos over his fourth marriage, to his mistress Zoe Karbonopsina. In 907, Leo VI had the patriarch deposed.

=== Crisis of 904 ===
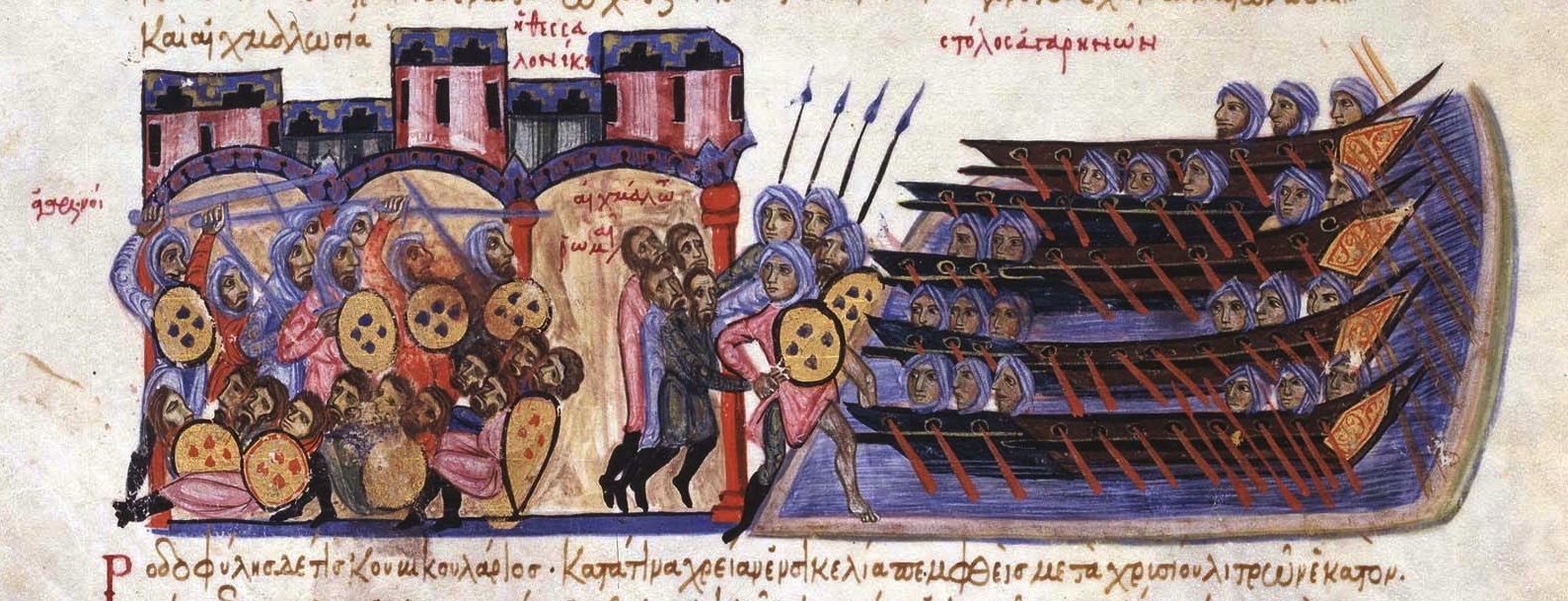
The Sack of Thessalonica by the Arabs, Madrid Skylitzes

At the beginning of the 10th century, the Arabs completed the conquest of Sicily and from 902 began attacking Byzantine shipping and towns in the Aegean Sea. In 904, they sacked the empire's second-largest city, Thessalonica, taking 22,000 captives and leaving the city virtually empty. Simeon decided to exploit that opportunity, and the Bulgarian army appeared in the vicinity of the deserted city. By securing and settling Thessalonica, the Bulgarians would have gained an important port on the Aegean Sea and would have cemented their hold on the western Balkans, creating a permanent threat to Constantinople. Aware of the danger, the Byzantines sent the experienced diplomat Leo Choirosphaktes to negotiate a solution. The course of the negotiations is unknown – in a surviving letter to emperor Leo VI the Wise, Choirosphaktes boasted that he had "convinced" the Bulgarians not to take the city but did not mention more details. However, an inscription found near the village of Narash testifies that since 904 the border between the two countries ran only 20 kilometres (12 mi) to the north of Thessalonica. As a result of the negotiations, Bulgaria secured the territorial gains acquired in Macedonia during the reign of Khan Presian I (r. 836–852) and expanded its territory further south, taking possession of most of the region. The western section of the Byzantine–Bulgarian border ran from the Falakro mountain through the town of Serres, which lay on the Byzantine side, then turned south-west to Narash, crossed the Vardar river at the modern village of Axiohori, ran through Mount Paiko, passed east of Edessa through the Vermio and Askio mountains, crossed the river Haliacmon south of the town of Kostur, which lay in Bulgaria, ran through the Gramos mountains, then followed the river Aoös until its confluence with the river Drino, and finally turned west, reaching the Adriatic Sea at the town of Himarë.

== Beginning of the war and Simeon I's coronation ==
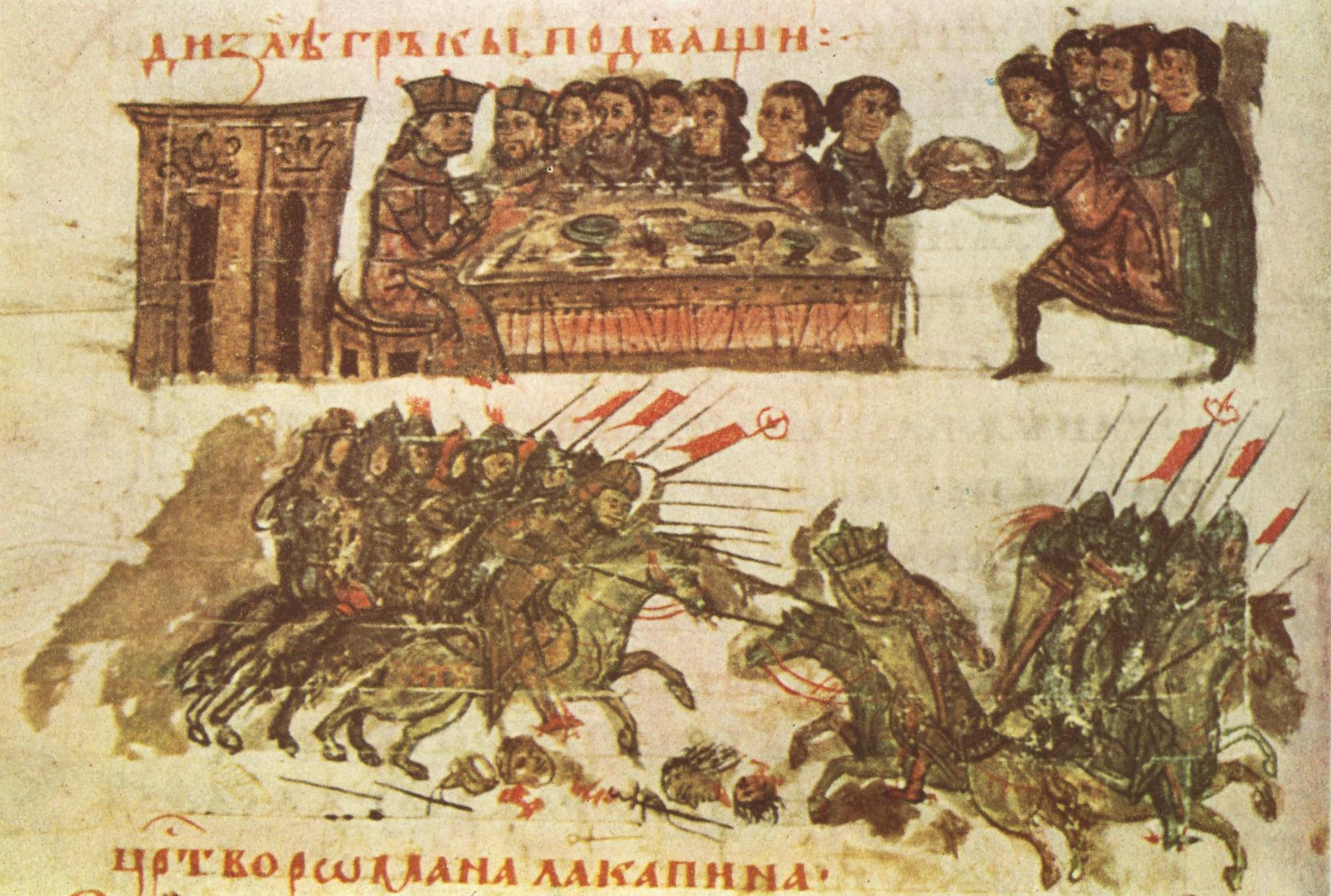
Above: a feast in Constantinople in honour of Simeon; below: a Bulgarian attack upon the Byzantines, Manasses Chronicle.

In 912 Leo VI died and was succeeded by his brother Alexander, who set about reversing many of Leo VI's policies and reinstated Nicholas Mystikos as patriarch. As the diplomatic protocol of the time prescribed, Simeon sent emissaries to confirm the peace in late 912 or early 913. According to the Byzantine chronicler Theophanes Continuatus, these emissaries said that Simeon "would honour the peace if he was to be treated with kindness and respect, as it was under emperor Leo. However, Alexander, overwhelmed by madness and folly, ignominiously dismissed the envoys, made threats to Simeon and thought he would intimidate him. The peace was broken and Simeon decided to raise arms against the Christians [the Byzantines]." Unlike his predecessors, Simeon's ultimate ambition was to assume the throne of Constantinople as a Roman emperor, creating a joint Bulgarian–Roman state. Alexander's provocative behavior furnished the Bulgarian ruler with a casus belli. However, the historian John Fine argues that Simeon had already planned an invasion before the failure of the embassy, judging the new Byzantine leadership to be weak: Alexander was unpopular, inexperienced and possibly alcoholic, and his successor Constantine VII was a sickly little boy, considered by many to be illegitimate. While Bulgaria was preparing for war, on 6 June 913 Alexander died, leaving Constantinople in chaos with an under-aged emperor under the regency of patriarch Mystikos.

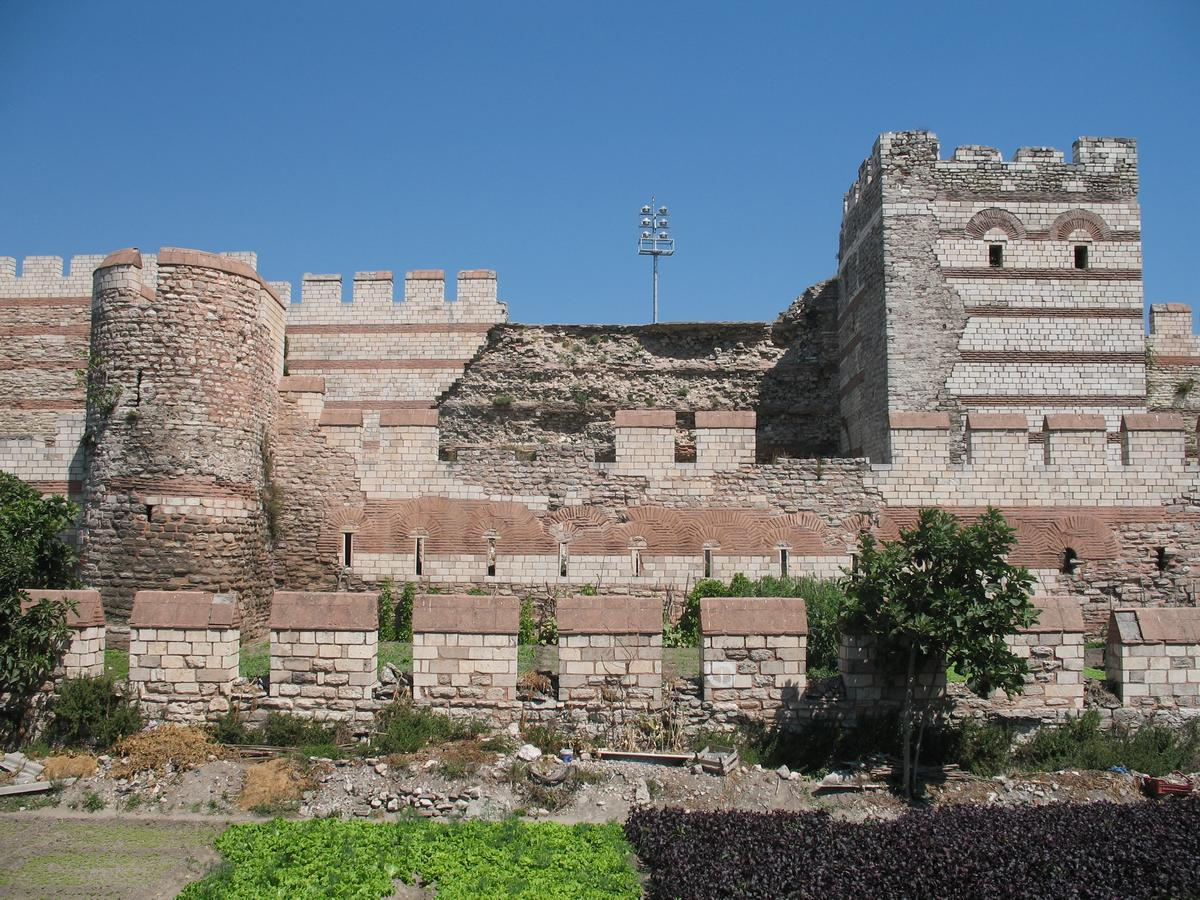
The Walls of Constantinople

The first steps of the regency were to attempt to divert Simeon's attack. Nicholas Mystikos sent a letter which, while praising the wisdom of Simeon, accused him of attacking an "orphan child" (i.e., Constantine VII) who had done nothing to insult him, but his efforts were in vain. Toward the end of July 913 the Bulgarian monarch launched a campaign at the head of a large army, and in August he reached Constantinople unopposed. The head of the Byzantine chancery, Theodore Daphnopates, wrote about the campaign fifteen years later: "There was an earthquake, felt even by those who lived beyond the Pillars of Hercules." The Bulgarians besieged the city and constructed ditches from the Golden Horn to the Golden Gate at the Marmara Sea. Since Simeon had studied at the University of Constantinople and was aware that the city was impregnable to a land attack without maritime support, those actions were a demonstration of power, not an attempt to assault the city. Soon, the siege was lifted and kavhan (first minister) Theodore Sigritsa was sent to offer peace. Simeon had two demands – to be crowned Emperor of the Bulgarians and to betroth his daughter to Constantine VII, thus becoming father-in-law and guardian of the infant emperor.

After negotiations between Theodore Sigritsa and the regency, a feast was organised in honour of Simeon's two sons in the Palace of Blachernae presided over personally by Constantine VII. Patriarch Nicholas Mystikos went to the Bulgarian camp to meet the Bulgarian ruler in the midst of his entourage. Simeon prostrated himself before the Patriarch, who instead of an imperial crown placed upon Simeon's head his own patriarchal crown. The Byzantine chronicles, who were hostile to Simeon, had presented the ceremony as a sham, but modern historians, such as John Fine, Mark Whittow and George Ostrogorsky, argue that Simeon was too experienced to be fooled and that he was indeed crowned Emperor of the Bulgarians (in Bulgarian, Tsar). The sources suggest that Nicholas Mystikos also agreed to Simeon's second condition, which could have paved Simeon's route to become co-emperor and eventually emperor of the Romans. Having achieved his goal, Simeon returned to Preslav in triumph, after he and his sons were honoured with many gifts. To mark this achievement, Simeon changed his seals to read "Simeon, peacemaking emperor, [may you reign for] many years".

== Battle of Achelous ==
The agreement concluded in August 913 proved to be short-lived. Two months later, Constantine VII's mother, Zoe Karbonopsina, was allowed to return to Constantinople from exile. In February 914 she overthrew the regency of Nicholas Mystikos in a palace coup. Mystikos reluctantly proclaimed her as empress, and retained his Patriarchal title. Her first order was to revoke all concessions given to the Bulgarian monarch by the regency, provoking military retaliation. In the summer of 914 the Bulgarian army invaded the themes of Thrace and Macedonia. Simultaneously, the Bulgarian troops penetrated into the regions of Dyrrhachium and Thessalonica to the west. Thrace's largest and most important city, Adrianople, was besieged and captured in September and the local population recognized Simeon as its ruler. However, the Byzantines promptly regained the city in exchange for a huge ransom.

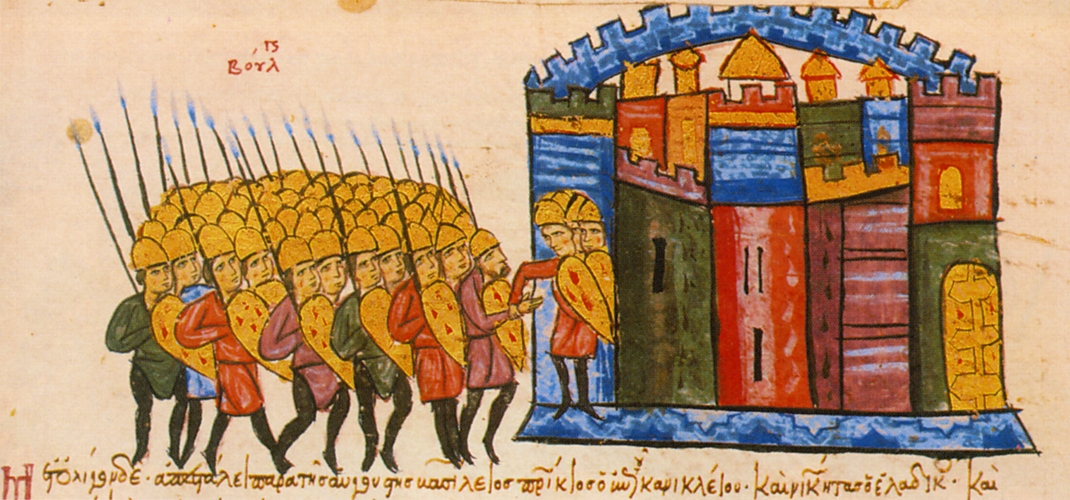
The Bulgarian army captures Adrianople after a siege in 914

To deal with the Bulgarian threat for good, the Byzantines took measures to end the conflict with the Abbasid Caliphate in the east and attempted to create a wide anti-Bulgarian coalition. Two envoys were sent to Baghdad, where they secured peace with caliph al-Muqtadir in June 917. The strategos of Dyrrhachium, Leo Rhabdouchos, was instructed to negotiate with the Serbian prince Petar Gojniković, who was a Bulgarian vassal but was willing to renounce Bulgarian suzerainty. However, the court in Preslav was warned about the negotiations by prince Michael of Zahumlje, a loyal ally of Bulgaria, and Simeon was able to prevent an immediate Serb attack. The Byzantine attempts to approach the Magyars were also successfully countered by the Bulgarian diplomacy. The general John Bogas was sent with rich gifts to the Pechenegs, who inhabited the steppes to the north-east of Bulgaria. The Bulgarians had already established strong connections with the Pechenegs, including through marriages, and Bogas' mission proved to be a hard one. He did manage to convince some tribes to send aid, but eventually the Byzantine navy refused to transport them to the south of the Danube river, probably as a result of the jealousy that existed between Bogas and the ambitious admiral Romanos Lekapenos.

...And even now there could be seen piles of bones at Anchialus, where the fleeing army of the Romans was disgracefully slain.

— from Leo the Deacon's History, 75 years after the battle of Achelous.

The Byzantines were forced to fight alone, but the peace with the Arabs allowed them to amass their whole army, including the troops stationed in Asia Minor. These forces were placed under the command of the Domestic of the Schools Leo Phokas the Elder. Before marching to battle the soldiers bowed to "the life-giving True Cross and vowed to die for one another". With his western and northern borders secure, Simeon was also able to muster a large host. The two armies clashed on 20 August 917 near the Achelous river in the vicinity of Anchialus. Initially, the Byzantines were successful, and the Bulgarians began an orderly retreat, but when Leo Phokas lost his horse, confusion spread among the Byzantine troops, who according to the chronicler John Skylitzes had low morale. Simeon, who was monitoring the battlefield from the nearby heights, ordered a counter-attack and personally led the Bulgarian cavalry. The Byzantine ranks broke and in the words of Theophanes Continuatus "a bloodshed occurred, that had not happened in centuries". Almost the whole Byzantine army was annihilated and only a few, including Leo Phokas, managed to reach the port of Messembria and flee to safety on ships.

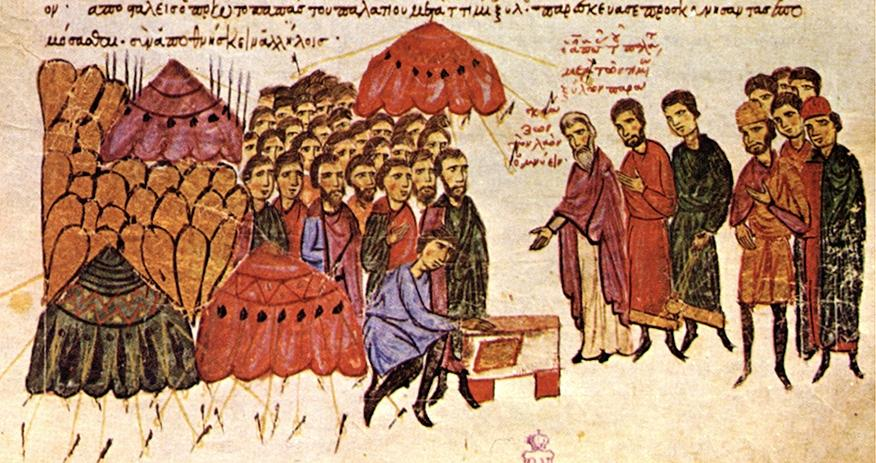
The Byzantine soldiers take an oath on the eve of the battle of Achelous, Madrid Skylitzes.

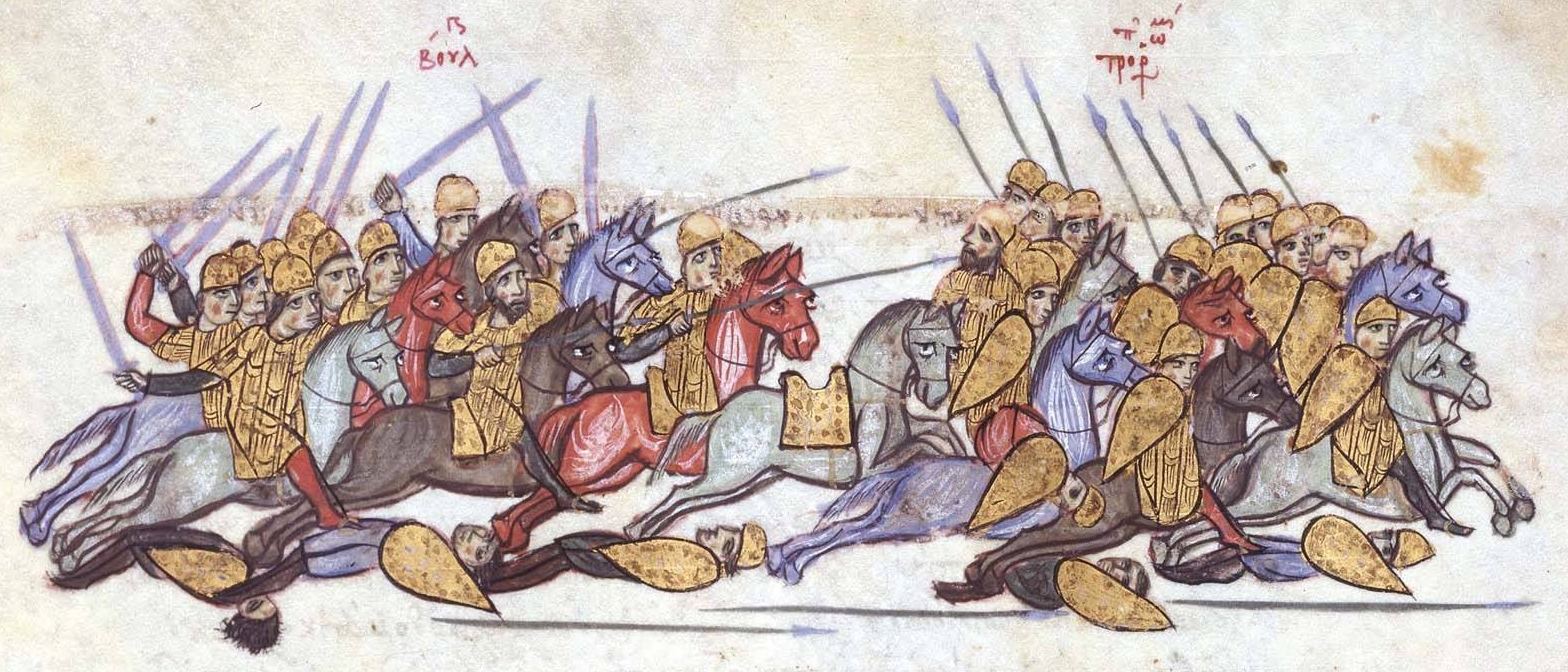
The Bulgarian army defeats the Byzantines at Achelous, Madrid Skylitzes.

Once again, Nicholas Mystikos was summoned in an attempt to stop the Bulgarian onslaught. In a letter to Simeon, the patriarch insisted that the purpose of the Byzantine attack had been not to destroy Bulgaria but to force Simeon to evacuate his troops from the regions of Thessalonica and Dyrrhachium. Yet he admitted that this was not an excuse for the Byzantine invasion and pleaded that as a good Christian Simeon should forgive his fellow Christians. The efforts of Nicholas Mystikos were in vain, and the Bulgarian army penetrated deep into Byzantine territory. Leo Phokas gathered another host but the Byzantines were heavily defeated in the battle of Katasyrtai just outside Constantinople in a night combat.

== Campaigns against the Serbs ==
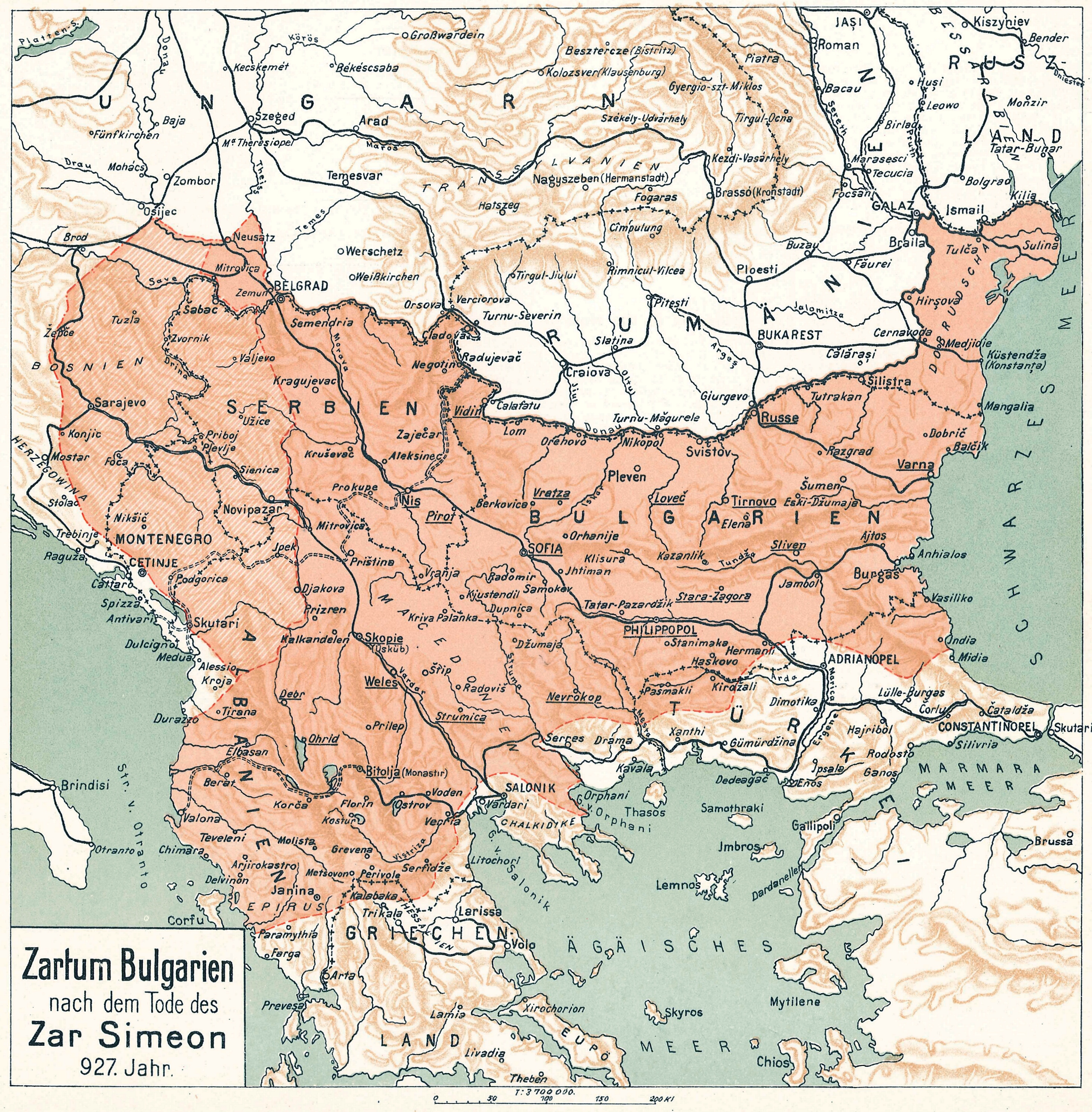
A map of Bulgaria during the rule of Simeon I

Following the victories in 917, the way to Constantinople lay open. However, Simeon had to deal with the Serbian prince Petar Gojniković, who had responded positively to the Byzantine proposal for an anti-Bulgarian coalition. An army was dispatched under the command of kavhan Theodore Sigritsa and general Marmais. The two persuaded Petar Gojniković to meet them, whereupon they seized him and sent him to Preslav, where he died in prison. The Bulgarians replaced Petar with Pavle Branović, a grandson of prince Mutimir, who had long lived in Preslav. Thus, Serbia was turned into a puppet state until 921.

In an attempt to bring Serbia under their control, in 920 the Byzantines sent Zaharija Pribislavljević, another of Mutimir's grandsons, to challenge the rule of Pavle. Zaharija was either captured by the Bulgarians en route or by Pavle, who had him duly delivered to Simeon. Either way, Zaharija ended up in Preslav. Despite the setback, the Byzantines persisted and eventually bribed Pavle to switch sides after lavishing much gold on him. In response, in 921 Simeon sent a Bulgarian army headed by Zaharija. The Bulgarian intervention was successful, Pavle was easily deposed, and once again a Bulgarian candidate was placed on the Serbian throne. This did not last long because Zaharija was raised in Constantinople where he was heavily influenced by the Byzantines. Soon, Zaharija openly declared his loyalty to the Byzantine Empire and commenced hostilities against Bulgaria. In 923 or 924 Simeon sent a small army led by Theodore Sigritsa and Marmais, but they were ambushed and killed. Zaharija sent their heads to Constantinople.

This action provoked a major retaliatory campaign in 924. A large Bulgarian force was dispatched, accompanied by a new candidate, Časlav, who was born in Preslav to a Bulgarian mother. The Bulgarians ravaged the countryside and forced Zaharija to flee to the Kingdom of Croatia. This time, however, the Bulgarians had decided to change their approach to the Serbs. They summoned all Serbian župans to pay homage to Časlav, then had them arrested and taken to Preslav. Serbia was annexed as a Bulgarian province, expanding the country's border to Croatia, which was at its apogee and proved to be a dangerous neighbour. The annexation was a necessary move since the Serbs had proven to be unreliable allies and Simeon had grown wary of the inevitable pattern of war, bribery and defection.

== Campaigns against the Byzantines (918–922) ==
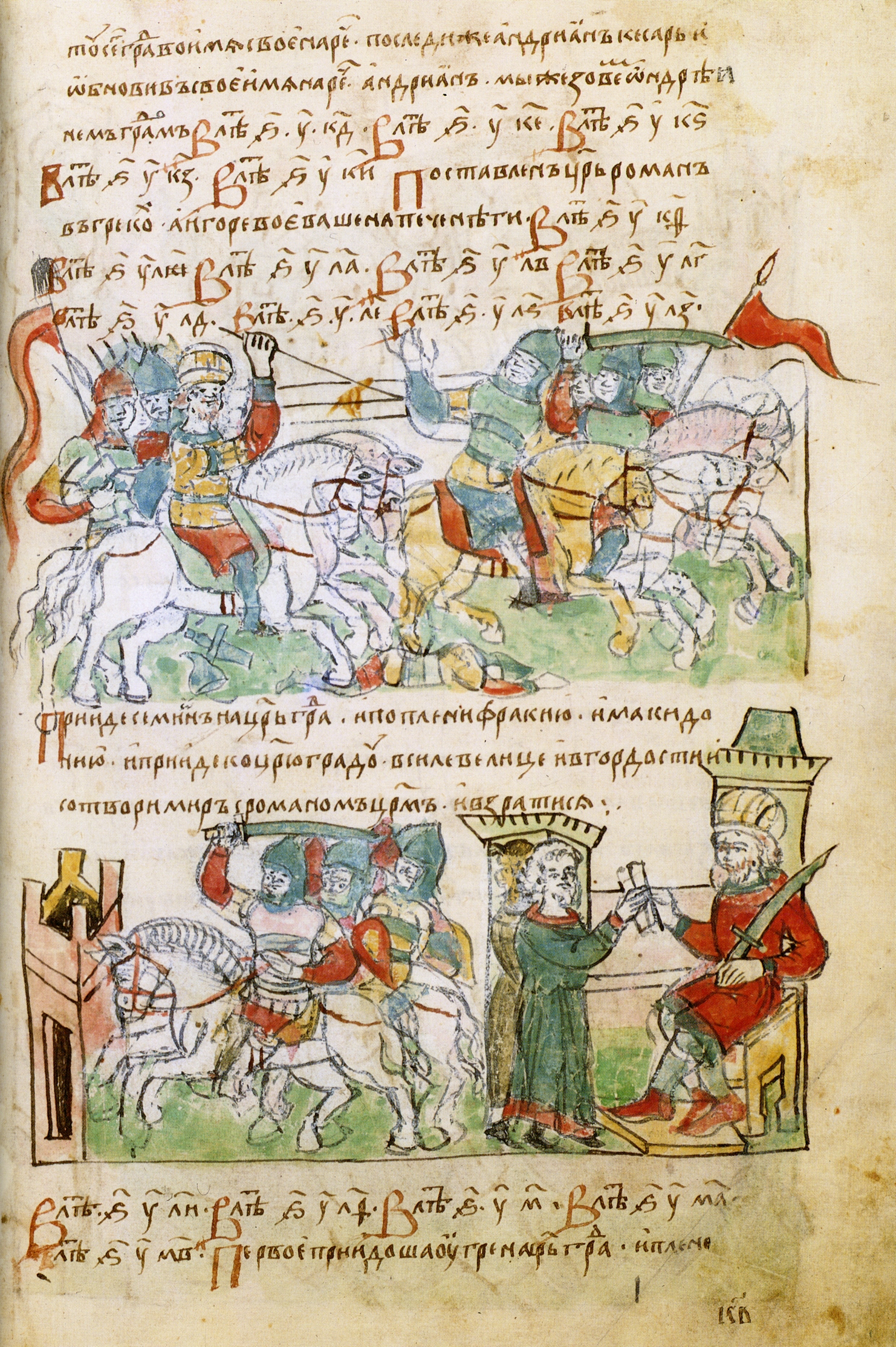
Above: A battle between Bulgarians and Byzantines in 914; below: negotiations between Simeon I and Romanos I, Radziwiłł Chronicle.

After the threat from Serbia was eliminated in 917, Simeon personally led a campaign in the Theme of Hellas and penetrated deep to the south, reaching the Isthmus of Corinth. Although many people fled to the island of Euboea and the Peloponnese peninsula, the Bulgarians took many captives and forced the population to pay taxes to the Bulgarian state. The capital of Hellas, Thebes, was seized and its fortifications destroyed. A noteworthy episode of that campaign was described in the manual on warfare Strategikon by the 11th-century writer Kekaumenos. After fruitlessly besieging a populous city in Hellas, Simeon employed a ruse de guerre by sending brave and resourceful men into the city to discover weaknesses in its defences. They discovered that the gates were held high above the ground on hinges. After receiving their report, Simeon sent five men into the city with axes to eliminate the guards, break the hinges, and open the gates for the Bulgarian army. After the gates were opened, the Bulgarian army moved in and occupied the city without bloodshed.

In the spring of 919, the military setbacks suffered by the Byzantines the previous two years triggered another change in Byzantine rule when Admiral Romanos Lekapenos forced Zoe Karbonopsina back to a monastery and quickly rose to prominence. In April, Lekapenos' daughter Helena Lekapene married Constantine VII, and Lekapenos assumed the title basileopator. In September, Lekapenos was named Caesar, and in December he was crowned senior emperor. This new development infuriated Simeon as he considered Romanos a usurper and felt insulted that a son of an Armenian peasant had taken his own desired position. As so, Simeon rebuffed offers to become related with Romanos through a dynastic marriage and refused to negotiate for peace until Lekapenos stepped down.

In the autumn of 920, the Bulgarian army campaigned deep into Thrace, reaching the Dardanelles and setting up camp on the shore of the Gallipoli Peninsula just across from the city of Lampsacus in Asia Minor. These actions caused great concern to the Byzantine court because the Bulgarians could cut Constantinople off from the Aegean Sea if they were successful in securing Gallipoli and Lampsacus. Patriarch Mystikos attempted to sue for peace and proposed a meeting with Simeon in Mesembria but to no avail.

The following year, the Bulgarians marched to Katasyrtai near Constantinople. The Byzantines attempted to lure the Bulgarians to the north away from their capital by conducting a campaign to the town of Thermopolis, near modern Burgas. The Byzantine commander Pothos Argyros sent a detachment under Michael, son of Moroleon, to monitor the movements of the Bulgarians. Michael's troops ultimately were discovered and ambushed by the Bulgarians. Although the Byzantines inflicted significant casualties on the Bulgarians, they were defeated. Michael was wounded and fled back to Constantinople where he died.

After the conflict at Aquae Calidae, additional Bulgarians forces led by Menikos and Kaukanos were sent south. They crossed the Strandzha mountains and ravaged the countryside around Constantinople, threatening the palaces around the Golden Horn. The Byzantines summoned a large army, including troops from the city garrison, the imperial guard, and sailors from the navy, commanded by Pothos Argyros and Admiral Alexios Mosele. In March 921, the opposing forces clashed in the Battle of Pegae where the Byzantines were routed. Pothos Argyros barely escaped, and Alexios Mosele drowned while attempting to board a ship. In 922, the Bulgarians captured the town of Vizye and burned the palaces of Empress Theodora near the Byzantine capital. Romanos tried to oppose them by dispatching troops under Saktikios. Saktikios attacked the Bulgarian camp while most soldiers were scattered to gather supplies. When the Bulgarian forces were reassembled and informed about the attack, they counter-attacked and defeated the Byzantines, mortally wounding their commander.

== Attempts for a Bulgarian–Arab alliance ==
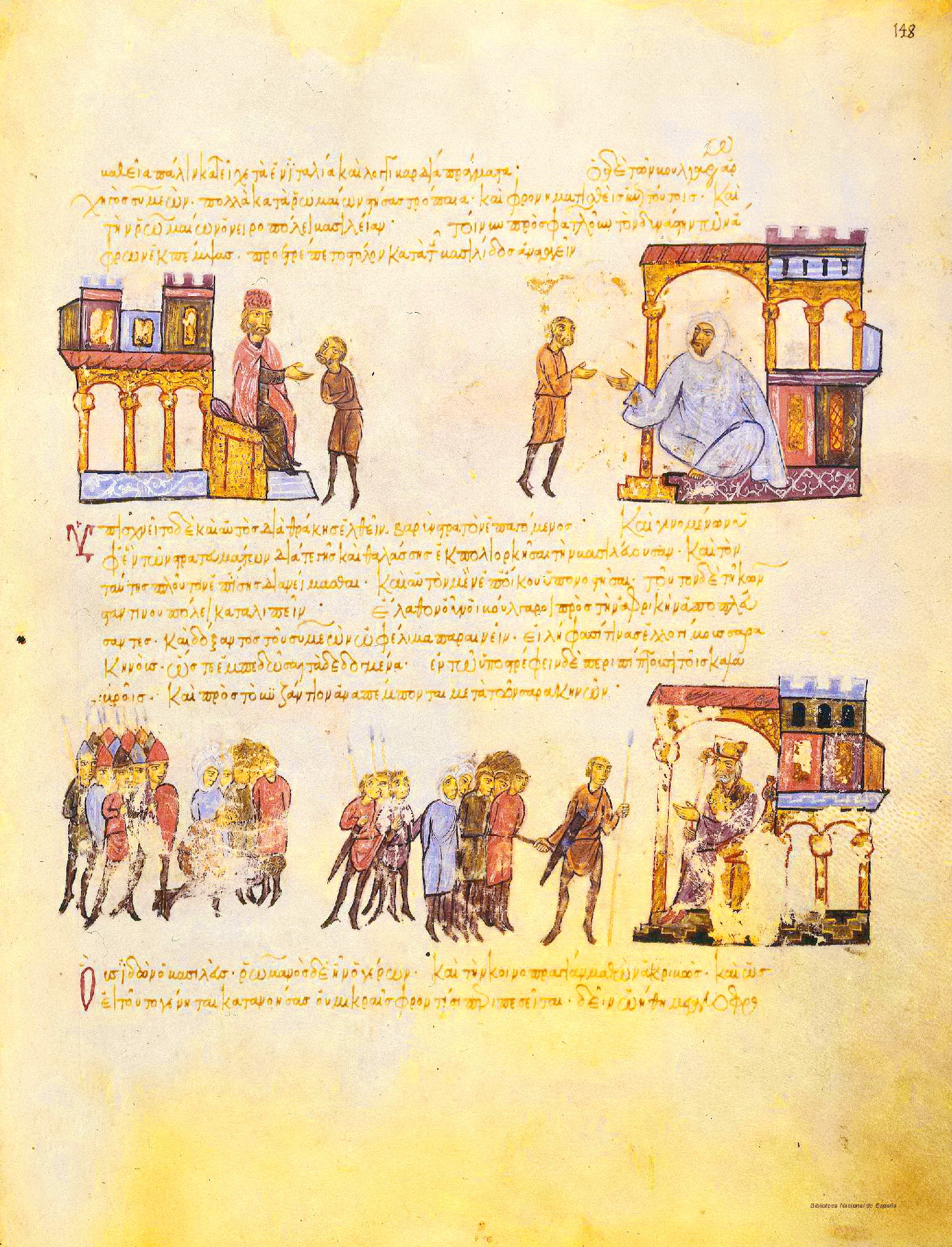
Romanos Lekapenos attempting to stop the alliance between Simeon of Bulgaria and Fatimid Caliph al-Mahdi Bilah.

By 922, although the Bulgarians controlled almost the entire Balkan peninsula, Simeon's main objective remained out of his reach. The Bulgarian monarch was aware that he needed a navy to conquer Constantinople. Simeon decided to turn to Abdullah al-Mahdi Billah (r. 909–934), founder and caliph of the Fatimid Caliphate. He ruled most of North Africa and posed a constant threat to the Byzantine possessions in Southern Italy. Although in 914 both sides had concluded a peace treaty, since 918 the Fatimids had renewed attacks on the Italian coast. In 922, the Bulgarians clandestinely sent envoys via Zachlumia, the state of their ally Michael, to the caliph's capital al-Mahdiyyah on the Tunisian coast. Simeon I suggested a joint attack on Constantinople with the Bulgarians providing a large land army and the Arabs a navy. It was proposed that all spoils would be divided equally, the Bulgarians would keep Constantinople and the Fatimids would gain the Byzantine territories in Sicily and Southern Italy.

Al-Mahdi Billah accepted the proposal and sent back his own emissaries to conclude the agreement. On the way home the ship was captured by the Byzantines near the Calabrian coast, and the envoys of both countries were sent to Constantinople. When Romanos I learned about the secret negotiations, the Bulgarians were imprisoned, while the Arab envoys were allowed to return to Al-Mahdiyyah with rich gifts for the caliph. The Byzantines then sent their own embassy to North Africa to outbid Simeon I, and eventually the Fatimids agreed not to aid Bulgaria. Another attempt of Simeon I to ally with the Arabs was recorded by the historian al-Masudi in his book Meadows of Gold and Mines of Gems. An Arab expedition from the Abbasid Caliphate under Thamal al-Dulafi landed on the Aegean coast of Thrace, and the Bulgarians established contact with them and sent envoys in Tarsus. However, this attempt also failed to produce tangible results.

== Later years ==
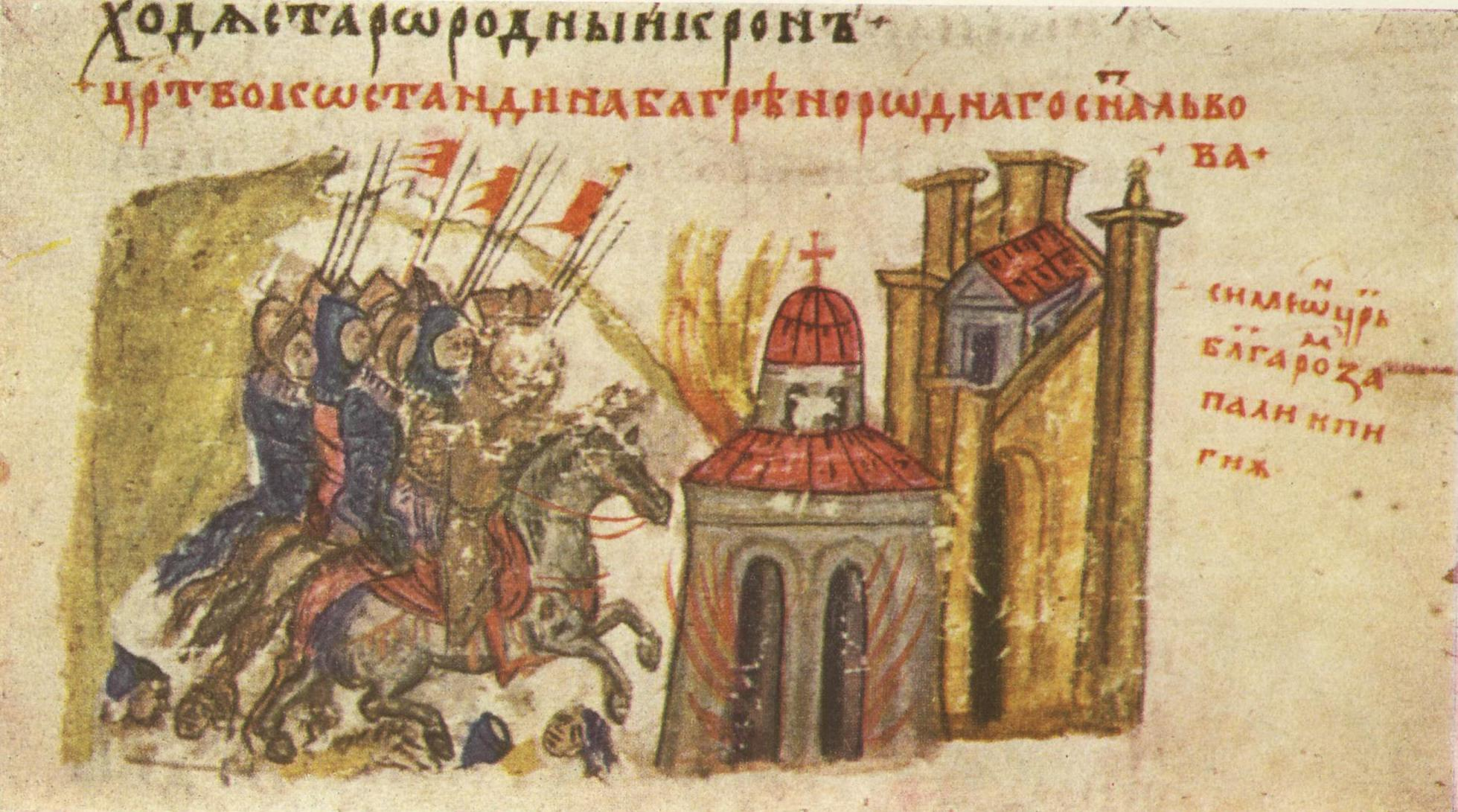
The Bulgarians burn the Church of St. Mary of the Spring, Manasses Chronicle

After the failure to secure an alliance with the Arabs, in September 923 or 924 Simeon I once again appeared in Byzantine Thrace. The Bulgarians pillaged the outskirts of Constantinople, burned the Church of St. Mary of the Spring and set up camp at the walls of Constantinople. Simeon I demanded a meeting with Romanos I in order to establish a temporary truce to deal with the Serbian threat. The Byzantines, eager to cease hostilities, agreed. Prior to the meeting at the suburb of Kosmidion, the Bulgarians took precautions and carefully inspected the specially prepared platform – they still remembered the failed Byzantine attempt to assassinate Khan Krum (r. 803–814) during negotiations at the same place a century earlier, in 813.

...Simeon arrived with a large army, divided into many units, some armed with golden shields and golden spears, others with silver shields and silver spears, others with arms in every colour, and all of them were covered in iron.

— Theophanes Continuatus on the Bulgarian army at Constantinople

Romanos I arrived first; Simeon I appeared on a horse surrounded by elite soldiers who shouted in Greek "Glory to Simeon, the Emperor". According to the Byzantine chronicles, after the two monarchs had kissed, Romanos I demanded that Simeon I stop spilling Christian blood in an unnecessary war and delivered a small sermon to the ageing Bulgarian ruler asking how he could face God with all that blood on his hands. Simeon I had nothing to respond. However, historian Mark Whittow notes that those accounts were nothing but official Byzantine wishful thinking, composed after the event. The only hint of what really happened was an allegoric story that at the moment the meeting concluded, two eagles were seen flying high in the sky, then they engaged and immediately separated, one headed northwards to Thrace, the other flying to Constantinople. This was seen as a bad omen representing the fates of the two rulers. The portent of two eagles is a rhetorical implication that in the meeting Romanos I recognized Simeon I's imperial title and his equal status to the emperor in Constantinople. However, Romanos I never ratified the agreement in Simeon I's lifetime, and the contradictions between the two sides remained unresolved. In a correspondence dated from 925, the Byzantine emperor criticized Simeon I for calling himself "Emperor of the Bulgarians and the Romans" and demanded the return of the conquered fortresses in Thrace.

In 926 the Bulgarians sent an army to invade the Kingdom of Croatia in order to secure their rear for a new offensive on Constantinople. Simeon I saw the Croatian state as a threat because king Tomislav (r. 910–928) was a Byzantine ally and harboured his enemies. The Bulgarians marched into Croatian territory but suffered a complete defeat at the hands of the Croats. Though peace was quickly restored through Papal mediation, Simeon I continued to prepare for an assault on the Byzantine capital. It was evident that the Bulgarian losses had not been significant because only a small portion of the whole army had been sent to fight the Croats. The Bulgarian monarch seemed secure in the belief that king Tomislav would honour the peace. However, like his predecessor Krum, Simeon I died in the midst of the preparations for an attack on Constantinople on 27 May 927, aged sixty–three.

== Peace treaty ==
Simeon I was succeeded by his second son Peter I (r. 927–969). At the beginning of Peter I's reign, the most influential person in the court was his maternal uncle, George Sursuvul, who served at first as a regent of the young monarch. Upon acceding to the throne, Peter I and George Sursuvul launched a campaign in Byzantine Thrace, razing the fortresses in the region that had been held until then by the Bulgarians. The raid was meant as a demonstration of power, and from a position of strength the Bulgarians proposed peace. Both sides sent delegations to Mesembria to discuss the preliminary terms. The negotiations continued in Constantinople until the final provisions were agreed upon. In November 927 Peter I himself arrived in the Byzantine capital and was received personally by Romanos I. In the Palace of Blachernae the two sides signed a peace treaty, sealed by a marriage between the Bulgarian monarch and the granddaughter of Romanos I, Maria Lekapene. On that occasion Maria was renamed Irene, meaning "peace". On 8 October 927 Peter I and Irene married in a solemn ceremony in the Church of St. Mary of the Spring – the same church that Simeon I had destroyed a few years earlier and that had been rebuilt.

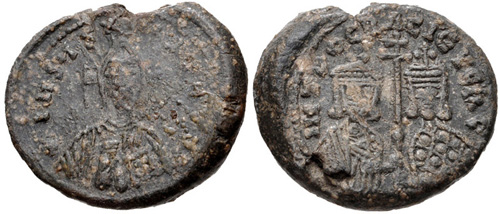
A seal of Emperor Peter I and Empress Irene

By the terms of the treaty, the Byzantines officially recognized the imperial title of the Bulgarian monarchs but insisted on the formula that the emperor of the Bulgarians be considered a "spiritual son" of the Byzantine emperor. Despite the wording, the title of the Bulgarian rulers equalled that of their Byzantine counterparts. The Bulgarian Orthodox Church was also recognized as an independent Patriarchate, thus becoming the fifth autocephalous Eastern Orthodox Church after the patriarchates of Constantinople, Alexandria, Antioch and Jerusalem, and the first national Orthodox Church. The treaty further stipulated an exchange of prisoners and an annual tribute to be paid by the Byzantines to the Bulgarian Empire. The treaty restored the border approximately along the lines agreed in 904 – the Bulgarians returned most of Simeon I's conquests in Thrace, Thessaly and Hellas and retained firm control over most of Macedonia and the larger part of Epirus. Thus, Peter I succeeded in obtaining all of his father's goals, except for Constantinople.

== Aftermath ==
During the first years of his reign, Peter I faced revolts by two of his three brothers, John in 928 and Michael in 930, but both were quelled. During most of his subsequent rule until 965, Peter I presided over a Golden Age of the Bulgarian state in a period of political consolidation, economic expansion and cultural activity. Cosmas, a contemporary Bulgarian priest and writer, describes a wealthy, book-owning and monastery-building Bulgarian elite, and the preserved material evidence from Preslav, Kostur and other locations suggests a wealthy and settled picture of 10th-century Bulgaria. The influence of the landed nobility and the higher clergy increased significantly at the expense of the personal privileges of the peasantry, causing friction in the society. Cosmas the Priest accused the Bulgarian abbots and bishops of greed, gluttony and neglect towards their flock. In that setting during the reign of Peter I arose Bogomilism – a dualistic heretic sect that in the subsequent decades and centuries spread to the Byzantine Empire, northern Italy and southern France (cf. Cathars). The strategic position of the Bulgarian Empire remained difficult. The country was ringed by aggressive neighbours – the Magyars to the north-west, the Pechenegs and the growing power of Kievan Rus' to the north-east, and the Byzantine Empire to the south, which despite the peace proved to be an unreliable neighbour.

The peace treaty allowed the Byzantine Empire to concentrate its resources on the declining Abbasid Caliphate to the east. Under the talented general John Kourkouas, the Byzantines reversed the course of the Byzantine–Arab wars, winning impressive victories over the Muslims. By 944 they had raided the cities of Amida, Dara and Nisibis in the middle Euphrates and besieged Edessa. The remarkable Byzantine successes continued under Nikephoros Phokas, who ruled as emperor between 963 and 969, with the reconquest of Crete in 961 and the recovery of some territories in Asia Minor. Growing Byzantine confidence and power spurred Nikephoros Phokas to refuse the payment of the annual tribute to Bulgaria in 965. This resulted in a Rus' invasion of Bulgaria in 968–971, which led to a temporary collapse of the Bulgarian state and a bitter 50-year Byzantine–Bulgarian war until the conquest of the Bulgarian Empire by the Byzantines in 1018.

There is an alternative point of view. Historian Vladimir Shikanov argues that the treaty was beneficial to the Byzantines rather than the Bulgarians, since Byzantium regained all the territories conquered by Simeon, with the exception of some Black Sea fortresses, and also provided for the exchange of prisoners. The author claims that the tribute was certainly an unpleasant factor, but it was presented as "gifts" and was purely symbolic. Yet, it should be taken into account that most researchers agree that the Byzantines had made concessions to Bulgaria. Steven Runciman notes that the peace treaty increased Bulgarian self-importance and pride, the arrangement for the titles was settled very satisfactorily, and while the country had gained little land, it "owed now spiritual allegiance to no foreign pontiff, and her ruler was an Emperor, the acknowledged equal of the anointed autocrats of Rome, ranking far above all other princes, even the Frankish monarchs, the soi-disant Emperors in the West". Timothy E. Gregory states that the concessions to Bulgaria were reasonable, and they recognized the considerable military power Bulgaria possessed, leading to a prolonged period of peace. John Fine notes that the Bulgarians sent terms for peace negotiations from a position of strength and remarks that the restoration of the border along the lines agreed upon by the treaties of 897 and 904 recognized Bulgaria's possession of Macedonia. Fine also comments that, when Nikephoros Phokas called the annual payment provision for Emperess Irene's upkeep, rather than a tribute, this may had been Nikephoros' own interpretation and not that of the original treaty. Paul Stephenson, noting the bias of the Byzantine sources, observes that one should be wary of interpretations that call Peter I's Bulgaria a harmless Byzantine protectorate. The Cambridge History of the Byzantine Empire also observes the existence of Byzantine propaganda in contemporary accounts. Many other historians, such as Vasil Zlatarski, Vasil Gyuzelev, Yordan Andreev, Milcho Lalkov, Ivan Bozhilov, etc., note that the Byzantines paid a high price for the peace, since Bulgaria gained significant political prestige by the recognition of the imperial authority of its rulers and the independence of its Patriarchate.

== See also ==
- Byzantine–Bulgarian wars
- Bulgarian–Serbian wars
- Medieval Bulgarian army
- Byzantine army

== Footnotes ==
=== Notes ===
a: The border stone found near Narash reads: "In the year of the creation of the world 6412, indict 7 [904]. Border between the Bulgarians and the Romans. In the reign of Simeon, by the Lord prince of Bulgaria, under olgutarkan Theodore and comita Dristra".
b: Constantine VII, called "the Purple-born", was a son of Leo VII and his fourth wife Zoe Karbonopsina. Their marriage caused a scandal in the Church.
c: The name of the city was not mentioned in Kekaumenos' Strategikon.
d: A legendary cause of Simeon I's death is given in several Byzantine accounts. In May 927 an astrologer named John informed emperor Romanos I that in the Forum of Constantine there was a statue looking towards the west which was an inanimate double of Simeon I. He told the emperor that if he removed the head of the statue, Simeon I would die. Romanos I promptly ordered the destruction of the statue and the old Bulgarian emperor died at that very hour.

== Sources ==
- Andreev, Iordan; Lalkov, Milcho (1996). Българските ханове и царе [The Bulgarian Khans and Tsars] (in Bulgarian). Veliko Tarnovo: Абагар. ISBN 954-427-216-X.
- Andreev, Iordan; Lazarov, Ivan; Pavlov, Plamen (1999). Кой кой е в средновековна България [Who is Who in Medieval Bulgaria] (in Bulgarian). Петър Берон. ISBN 978-954-402-047-7.
- Angelov, Dimitar; Bozhilov, Ivan; Vaklinov, Stancho; Gyuzelev, Vasil; Kuev, Kuyu; Petrov, Petar; Primov, Borislav; Tapkova, Vasilka; Tsankova, Genoveva (1981). История на България. Том II. Първа българска държава [History of Bulgaria. Volume II. First Bulgarian State] (in Bulgarian). et al. Sofia: Bulgarian Academy of Sciences Press.
- Bakalov, Georgi; Angelov, Petar; Pavlov, Plamen; Koev, Totyu; Aleksandrov, Emil (2003). История на българите от древността до края на XVI век (History of the Bulgarians from Antiquity to the end of the XVI century) (in Bulgarian). et al. Sofia: Знание. ISBN 954-621-186-9.
- Bozhilov, Ivan; Gyuzelev, Vasil (1999). История на средновековна България VII–XIV век [History of Medieval Bulgaria VII–XIV centuries] (in Bulgarian). Sofia: Анубис. ISBN 954-426-204-0.
- Koledarov, Petar (1979). Политическа география на средновековната Българска държава, част 1 (681–1018) [Political Geography of the Medieval Bulgarian State, Part I. (681-1018)] (in Bulgarian). Sofia: Bulgarian Academy of Sciences Press.
- Collective (1964). "11. Продължителят на Теофан" [11. Theophanes Continuatus]. Гръцки извори за българската история (ГИБИ), том V [Greek Sources for Bulgarian History (GIBI), volume V] (in Bulgarian and Greek). Sofia: Bulgarian Academy of Sciences Press.
- Collective (1965). Гръцки извори за българската история (ГИБИ), том VI [Greek Sources for Bulgarian History (GIBI), volume VI] (in Bulgarian and Greek). Sofia: Bulgarian Academy of Sciences Press.
- Collective (1968). Гръцки извори за българската история (ГИБИ), том VII [Greek Sources for Bulgarian History (GIBI), volume VII] (in Bulgarian and Greek). Sofia: Bulgarian Academy of Sciences Press.
- Fine, John V. A. Jr. (1991) [1983]. The Early Medieval Balkans: A Critical Survey from the Sixth to the Late Twelfth Century. Ann Arbor: University of Michigan Press. ISBN 0-472-08149-7.
- Gregory, Timothy E. (2005). A History of Byzantium. Blackwell Publishing. ISBN 0-631-23513-2.
- Haldon, John (1999). Warfare, State and Society in the Byzantine World, 565–1204. London: UCL Press. ISBN 1-85728-495-X.
- Kazhdan, Alexander, ed. (1991). The Oxford Dictionary of Byzantium. Oxford and New York: Oxford University Press. ISBN 0-19-504652-8.
- Obolensky, Dimitri (1974) [1971]. The Byzantine Commonwealth: Eastern Europe, 500-1453. London: Cardinal. ISBN 978-0-351-17644-9.
- Runciman, Steven (1930). "The Two Eagles". A History of the First Bulgarian Empire. London: George Bell & Sons. OCLC 832687.
- Runciman, Steven (1988) [1929]. The Emperor Romanus Lecapenus and His Reign: A Study of Tenth-Century Byzantium. Cambridge: Cambridge University Press. ISBN 0-521-35722-5.
- Shepard, Johnathan (2008). The Cambridge History of the Byzantine Empire c. 500–1492. Cambridge University Press. ISBN 978-0-521-83231-1.
- Stephenson, Paul (2004). Byzantium's Balkan Frontier. A Political Study of the Northern Balkans, 900–1204. Cambridge University Press. ISBN 0-511-03402-4.
- Whittow, Mark (1996). The Making of Byzantium (600–1025). Los Angeles: University of California Press. ISBN 0-520-20497-2.
- Zlatarski, Vasil (1972) [1927]. История на българската държава през средните векове. Том I. История на Първото българско царство [History of the Bulgarian state in the Middle Ages. Volume I. History of the First Bulgarian Empire.] (in Bulgarian) (2 ed.). Sofia: Наука и изкуство. OCLC 67080314.
- Shikanov, Vladimir (2006). Византия. Орёл и Лев. Византийско-Болгарские войны [Byzantium. Eagle and Lion. Byzantine-Bulgarian Wars] (in Russian). ISBN 5-94988-022-6.
