= Artanes (Bithynia) =

Historic city on Anatolia

Coordinates: 41°10′17″N 29°36′15″E

Artanes (Ancient Greek: Ἀρτάνης) was a coastal town of ancient Bithynia located on the Pontus Euxinus at the mouth of the Artanes River (the modern Türknil Nehri). There was a port and a temple of Venus.

Its site is located near Şile in Asiatic Turkey.
