= Pegae (Thrace) =

Ancient town near Byzantion

Coordinates: 41°02′08″N 28°57′55″E

Pegae or Pegai (Ancient Greek: Πηγαί), also known as Crenides or Krenides (Κρενίδες), both words meaning springs in Greek, was a town of ancient Thrace, near Byzantium. Nearby was fought the Battle of Pegae in March of 921.

The site of Pegae is near the modern Kasımpaşa, in European Turkey.
