= Timothy E. Gregory =

American historian and scholar

Timothy E. Gregory (born c. July 1951) is an American historian and scholar, specializing in the Byzantine Empire and classical archaeology.

== Education and career ==
He graduated with a PhD in 1972 from the University of Michigan, where he studied under Byzantine historian Paul Alexander and Roman historian John W. Eadie. He joined the Ohio State University in 1978, where he taught in the Department of History until his retirement. He is fluent in Greek.

Gregory was one of several notable scholars who in the 1970s were of vital influence into the evolution of the studying of the Late Antiquity period, drawing on complex early texts and analysing them in detail and publishing his findings. He has conducted detailed research into early Christianity, numismatics, epigraphy and wider socio-economic customs and many others during this period, covering Ancient Rome, Greece and Turkey. Gregory has also served as director of the Ohio State University Excavations at Isthmia and Co-Director of the Eastern Korinthia Archaeological Survey.

== Publications ==
One of his earliest books, Vox Populi, first published in 1979, explores religious tension and violence in the 5th century in Ancient Greece and the Middle East. Other notable books include Panathenaia: Studies in Athenian life and thought in the classical age (1979), A social history of Philippi in the first century (1988), The soteriology of Clement of Rome within the intellectual matrix (1988), Archaeology and oligarchy at Isthmia (1989), The early Byzantine empresses and the Orthodox Church (1990), The sanctuary at Epidauros and cult-based networking in the Greek world of the fourth century B.C. (1992) and Greek and Indian mercantile communities of the diaspora (1993), Hellenic religion and Christianization, c. 370–529, (2001) and The Lives of Peter the Iberian, Theodosius of Jerusalem (2008). In 2005 he first published an important general history work entitled A History of Byzantium, published in its second edition in 2010. His articles related to Ancient Rome and Greece have also been published in notable publications; of major note was his essay, Survival of Paganism in Christian Greece: A Critical Essay, published in 1986 by the American Journal of Philology.

== Gregory Archive ==
Upon his retirement from Ohio State University, Gregory donated his research archive to Michigan State University, which currently serves at the institutional sponsor for the Excavations at Isthmia. This material is being developed into an open access digital repository. A significant component of this archive consists of thousands of 35mm color slides that document Gregory's research and travel since the late 1960s.
