= Aquae Calidae, Bulgaria =

Ancient town built around mineral baths

Aquae Calidae (Thrace)
- Location within Bulgaria
- 42.610935°N 27.393225°E
- Type: Settlement
- Location: Burgas Province, Bulgaria
- Region: Thrace

Aquae Calidae (Latin for warm waters, Bulgarian: Акве Калиде), also known as Therma and Thermopolis in the Middle Ages, was an ancient town in Thrace located in the territory of today's Bulgarian port city of Burgas on the Black Sea. It was built around thermal baths using the hot springs and became one of the most important spa centres of ancient times.

The site and baths of Aquae Calidae have been visited in the course of history by several important rulers from Philip II of Macedon to the Eastern Roman emperors Justinian I and Constantine IV, the Bulgarian ruler Tervel and the Ottoman sultan Suleiman the Magnificent.

Aquae Calidae is shown on the Tabula Peutingeriana (edition of Konrad Miller, 1887), an illustrated itinerarium (ancient Roman road map) showing the layout of the road network of the Roman Empire.

== History ==
Archaeology has shown that the hot springs were already used in the Neolithic between the 6th and 5th millennium BC. The Thracians built a sanctuary of the Three Nymphs in the 1st millennium BC around the spring. In the 4th century BC, Philip II conquered the region and according to legend, he was a frequent guest there.

The over 4,000 coins found show the cosmopolitan nature of visitors from many regions of Europe as they originated from ancient Greece and Italy as well as from Kabyle, Mesambria (now Nessebar), Odessos, Histria, Tomis, Byzantium, Abdera, Maroneia and the islands of the Aegean, the oldest from Apollonia Pontica from the 5th century BC.

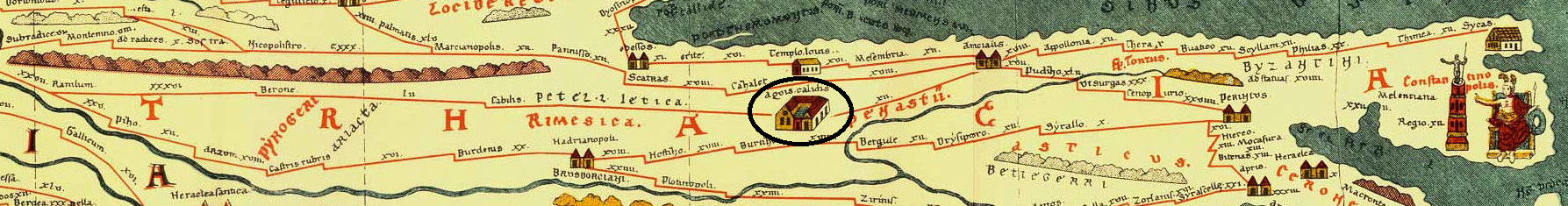
Aquae Calidae on Tabula Peutingeriana

The first baths at the Sanctuary of the Three Nymphs originated when the Roman Empire under Lucullus conquered the region, during the Third Mithridatic War in 72 BC. Under Trajan (98-117) nearby Anchialos became the administrative centre of the region and the baths were expanded and extended with two more swimming pools. During this time the Via Pontica was built connecting Constantinople via Deultum, Anchialos, Aquae Calidae with Dorostorum and Sexaginta Prista on the Danube. Near the baths a road station (statio milliaria) was created with the name Aquae Calidae.

The Sanctuary of the Three Nymphs continued to exist next to the station and the Baths, and became known as the Nymphaeum of Anchialos. Under Septimius Severus in 209-211 three years of games and celebrations under the name of Severia Nymphaea took place in the baths. Games also took place in Aquae Calidae under the emperors Geta and Caracalla.

Jordanes, who lived in the 6th century, described in his work Getica the incursions of Gothic tribes on the southern Black Sea coast of Thrace in 270. He reported that the Goths, after the conquest of Anchialos, moved to hot springs ("aquarum calidarum") 19 kilometres (12 mi) from Anchialos and stayed there for several days to recover.

The baths were restored and expanded at the end of the 4th or early the 5th century. According to Procopius of Caesarea fortress walls were also built around the city under Emperor Justinian I as follows:

...Thracians live in a port city of Euxeinos Pontos named Anchialos, [...] not far from the city springs water from natural, warm springs, which serve as baths of the local population. This settlement, which was not fortified since ancient times, was not perceived by the ancient emperors, even though barbarians settled nearby and the sick visited them at the risk of their lives. But now Emperor Justinian has surrounded them with walls and made the healing harmless.

The Eastern Roman Emperor Tiberius II Constantine chose the city for the cure of a disease of his wife Anastasia. When this healing was successful in around 580, she gave the local church her imperial robes. In 584, the Avars under Khan Baian conquered Aquae Calidae, but Baian spared the baths at the request of his harem. In one of the churches of the city the Avars found the imperial robes of Anastasia and Baian took them and allegedly claimed control of the empire.

In the Middle Ages the city was known as Therma or Thermopolis and was often contested between the Bulgarian and Byzantine Empires. It was incorporated in Bulgaria in 705 along with the region Zagora, after it was ceded by the Byzantine emperor Justinian II to the Bulgarian khan Tervel. In 921, during the Byzantine–Bulgarian war of 913–927, the Byzantines launched a campaign that reached the city. The Byzantine commander Pothos Argyros sent a detachment to monitor the movements of the Bulgarians, which was ambushed and defeated by the Bulgarian army.

In 1205, the Bulgarian emperor Kaloyan defeated the Crusader Latin Empire and captured their emperor Baldwin I, who died in captivity in the Bulgarian capital Tarnovo. In response, his successor Henry launched a retaliatory campaign against the Bulgarian cities south of the Balkan Mountains. In 1206 he captured Thermopolis and burned it. His commander Geoffrey of Villehardouin wrote: "This was a very beautiful city, well situated, with many warm springs for bathing - the best in the whole world. We took great booty from it." The city never recovered, although the baths were restored.

== Archaeology ==
The first archaeological excavations were by Bogdan Filov in 1910. In the pools he found over 4,000 coins of various eras, jewelry and other everyday items dated from the 5th to the 13th century.

Since 2008, large-scale excavation and reconstruction has taken place. By 2010, an area of more than 3,800 sq. m was uncovered, including the ancient thermal spas, the north gate and parts of the 5m thick city walls.

The city covered 10 km^{2} and the walled part some 2 km^{2}.

In July 2011, an area of 36,000 m^{2} was declared an archaeological reserve.

== Sources ==
- Златарски (Zlatarski), Васил (Vasil) (1972) [1927]. История на българската държава през средните векове. Том I. История на Първото българско царство. (History of the Bulgarian state in the Middle Ages. Volume I. History of the First Bulgarian Empire.) (in Bulgarian) (2 ed.). София (Sofia): Наука и изкуство (Nauka i izkustvo). OCLC 67080314.
