= Alexios Mosele (admiral) =

Alexios Mosele (Greek: Ἀλέξιος Μωσηλέ), or Musele/Mousele (Greek: Μουσηλέ), was a Byzantine admiral (droungarios tou ploimou) in the early reign of Emperor Romanos I Lekapenos (r. 920–944). He was killed in 921, leading a detachment of imperial marines along with the imperial tagmata under the domestikos ton scholon, Pothos Argyros, against the forces of the Bulgarian tsar, Simeon I (r. 893–927) during the Byzantine–Bulgarian war of 913–927. The Byzantines were defeated at the Battle of Pegae, and during the subsequent flight, Mosele slipped and drowned while trying to board one of his warships.

== Sources ==
- Kazhdan, Alexander, ed. (1991). Oxford Dictionary of Byzantium. New York and Oxford: Oxford University Press. ISBN 978-0-19-504652-6.
- Guilland, Rodolphe (1967). Recherches sur les institutions byzantines, Tome II (in French). Berlin: Akademie-Verlag.
- Treadgold, Warren (1997). A History of the Byzantine State and Society. Stanford, California: Stanford University Press. ISBN 0-8047-2630-2.
