= Crenides (Bithynia) =

Town on the Pontic coast of Bithynia

Coordinates: 41°29′26″N 31°50′27″E

Crenides or Krenides (Ancient Greek: Κρηνίδες), or Cranides or Kranides (Κρανίδες), was a town on the Pontic coast of Bithynia, according to Arrian 60 stadia east of Sandaraca; according to Marcian only 20 stadia. It was between Heraclea and the mouth of the Billaeus.

The site of Crenides is near the modern Kilimli, Turkey.
