= Manglabites =

Byzantine bodyguards

The Manglabites or Manglavites (Greek: μαγ[γ]λαβίται, manglabitai; sing. μαγ[γ]λαβίτης, manglabitēs) were a corps of bodyguards in the Byzantine Empire.

== Etymology ==
Their name derives from the term manglabion (μαγγλάβιον, "cudgel") which was also used to designate the entire corps. The origin of the term itself is debated: one theory regards it as deriving from Arabic mijlab ("whip"), while another from Latin manus ("hand") and clava ("cudgel").

== History ==
The manglabitai first appear in the 9th century, when, along with the imperial Hetaireia, they were responsible for the personal safety of the emperor. Armed with swords, the manglabitai preceded him in ceremonies and were responsible for the unlocking of certain gates of the imperial palace, the Great Palace of Constantinople, every morning.

== Structure ==
An individual manglabitēs was of relatively lowly origin and status, often even illiterate. However, their commander, known as prōtomanglabitēs (πρωτομαγγλαβίτης, "first manglabitēs") or epi tou manglabiou (ἐπί τοῦ μαγγλαβίου, "in charge of the manglabion"), ranked high in the imperial hierarchy due to his proximity to the emperor. The manglabitai as an imperial bodyguard appear to have disappeared by the late 11th century, but there is sigillographic evidence for "manglabitai of the Great Church" (i.e. the Patriarchate of Constantinople) from the 11th through the 13th centuries.

== Notable members ==
The perhaps most famous manglabitēs was the Norwegian king Harald Hardrada, who received the title in recognition of his services in the Varangian Guard in the 1030s.
