= Paradynasteuon =

Ruler's favourite in the Byzantine empire

The paradynasteuōn (Greek: παραδυναστεύων, "the one who rules beside") was a term used, especially in the Byzantine Empire, to designate a ruler's favorite, often raised to the position of chief minister. Probably deriving from Thucydides, it was used in the later Roman Empire for people with great authority. It was not an official title or position, but the term was extensively used by chroniclers such as Theophanes the Confessor or Theophanes Continuatus to designate an emperor's closest aide and chief minister. It gained greater currency during the Komnenian period and continued to be used by historians of the Palaiologan period, although the more technical term of mesazōn ("mediator"), which eventually came to correspond to an actual office, had largely replaced it.

== Sources ==
- Kazhdan, Alexander (1991). "Paradynasteuon". In Kazhdan, Alexander (ed.). The Oxford Dictionary of Byzantium. Oxford and New York: Oxford University Press. p. 1548. ISBN 0-19-504652-8.
