= Ralph-Johannes Lilie =

German Byzantine historian (born 1947)

Ralph-Johannes Lilie (born 30 December 1947, Hamburg) is a German Byzantinist.

== Life ==
He graduated from LMU Munich in 1975 with a dissertation entitled 'The Byzantine Reaction to the Arab Invasions – Studies on the Transformation of Government Structures in the Byzantine States in the 7th and 8th Century' and habilitated in 1982–83 at the Byzantinisch-Neugriechischen Seminar of the Free University of Berlin, where he was an extraordinary professor from 1984 to 2005. Since 1992, he has been working on the Prosopographie der mittelbyzantinischen Zeit (PmbZ) project at the Berlin-Brandenburg Academy of Sciences and Humanities. His wife is the medievalist Marie-Luise Favreau-Lilie.

== Selected works ==
- Die byzantinische Reaktion auf die Ausbreitung der Araber. Studien zur Strukturwandlung des byzantinischen Staates im 7. und 8. Jahrhundert. Institut für Byzantinistik und Neugriechische Philologie der Ludwig-Maximilians-Universität München 1976.
- Byzanz. Kaiser und Reich. Böhlau, Köln-Weimar-Wien 1994, ISBN 3-412-00394-8.
- Byzanz. Das zweite Rom. Siedler, Berlin 2003, ISBN 3-88680-693-6.
- Byzanz und die Kreuzzüge. Kohlhammer Verlag, Stuttgart 2004, ISBN 3-17-017033-3.
- Byzanz: Geschichte des oströmischen Reiches 326–1453. 5. durchgesehene Auflage, Beck München 2010 (Beck'sche Reihe Wissen), ISBN 978-3-406-41885-3.
- Einführung in die byzantinische Geschichte. Kohlhammer Verlag, Stuttgart 2007, ISBN 978-3-17-018840-2.
