= 860s =

Decade

The 860s decade ran from January 1, 860, to December 31, 869.

== Events ==
=== 860 ===
==== By place ====
====== Byzantine Empire ======
- June 18 – Byzantine–Rus' War: A fleet of about 200 Rus' vessels sails into the Bosphorus, and starts pillaging the suburbs of Constantinople. The raiders set homes on fire, and drown and kill the citizens. Unable to do anything to repel the invaders, Patriarch Photios I urges his flock to implore the Theotokos to save the Byzantine capital. Having devastated the suburbs, the Rus' Vikings pass into the Sea of Marmara and attack the Isles of the Princes, plundering the local monasteries.

====== Europe ======
- King Charles the Bald gives the order to build fortified bridges across the Seine and Loire Rivers, to protect Paris and the Frankish heartland against Viking raids. He hires the services of Weland, a Viking chieftain based on the Somme, to attack the Seine Vikings at their base on the Isle of Oissel. Weland besieges the Vikings—they offer him a huge bribe (6,000 pounds of silver) to let them escape.
- Summer – The Viking chieftains Hastein and Björn Ironside ravage upstream and move to Italy, sacking Luna (believing it to be Rome). They sail up the River Arno to sack the cities of Pisa and Fiesole (Tuscany).
- Summer – Viking raiders led by Weland sail to England and attack Winchester (the capital of Wessex), which is set ablaze. He spreads inland, but is defeated by West Saxon forces, who deprive him of all he has gained.
- December 20 – King Æthelbald of Wessex dies after a 2½-year reign. He is succeeded by his brother, sub-king Æthelberht of Kent, who becomes sole ruler of Wessex.

====== Iberian Peninsula ======
- Muhammad I, Umayyad emir of Córdoba, invades Pamplona (Pyrenees), and captures Crown Prince Fortún Garcés in Milagro, along with his daughter Onneca Fortúnez, and takes them as hostages to Córdoba.

==== By topic ====
====== Art ======
- Lusterware tiles, that decorated the mihrab of the Mosque of Uqba at Kairouan (modern Tunisia), are made (approximate date).

====== Communication ======
- The Japanese alphabet Hiragana becomes more popular in Japan. The phonetic alphabet will be further simplified, and reduced to 51 basic characters (approximate date).

====== Religion ======
- Byzantine missionaries Cyril and Methodius arrive in Khazaria.
- Michael I succeeds Sophronius I, as patriarch of Alexandria.

=== 861 ===
==== By place ====
====== Europe ======
- March – Robert the Strong is appointed margrave of Neustria by King Charles the Bald. He re-establishes the Breton March, and extends his remit by campaigning against Salomon, duke 'king' of Brittany. Robert hires a combined Seine-Loire fleet for 6,000 pounds of silver, 'before Salomon can ally with them against him'. In return, Salomon enlists 12 Viking ships under the command of Hastein, to raid the county of Maine, which, with Anjou, becomes squeezed between Brittany and Neustria.
- Spring – The Council of Constantinople, attended by 318 fathers and presided over by papal legates, confirms Photius the Great as patriarch, and passes 17 canons.
- Carloman, eldest son of King Louis the German, revolts against his father. He is captured, but manages to escape to the Ostmark (or 862).
- Summer – Viking raiders sack the cities of Paris, Cologne, Aachen, Worms and Toulouse.

====== Abbasid Caliphate ======
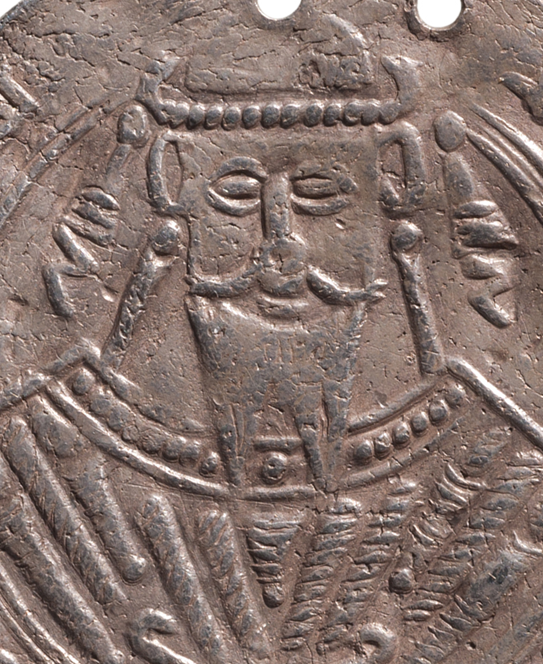
Dirham Bust of Al-Mutawakkil. He was assassinated by his Turkic guards and his son on the night of 11 December 861

- December 11 – Caliph al-Mutawakkil is assassinated by his Turkish guard, starting the period of troubles known as the "Anarchy at Samarra" (861–870). He is succeeded by his son Al-Muntasir, as ruler of the Abbasid Caliphate.
- Ya'qub ibn al-Layth, a Muslim military leader, starts rebelling against the Abbasids and founds the Saffarid Dynasty in the 870s. He rules over parts of Khurasan and eastern Iran, and establishes his capital at Zaranj (modern Afghanistan).

==== By topic ====
====== Hydrology ======
- Al-Mutawakkil (r. 847–861) orders the construction of a Nilometer on Rhoda Island in central Cairo, supervised by the Persian astronomer Ahmad ibn Muhammad ibn Kathir al-Farghani.

=== 862 ===
==== By place ====
====== Central Europe ======
- King Lothair II of Lotharingia tries to divorce his wife Teutberga, on trumped-up charges of incest. With the support of his brother, Louis II, the bishops give him permission to remarry during a synod at Aachen.
- March – Viking raiders led by Weland are trapped at Trilbardou Bridge (Northern France), and submit to King Charles the Bald. He and his family accept Christianity (they are baptised) before leaving Neustria.
- Robert the Strong, margrave of Neustria, captures 12 Viking ships and kills their crews. He pays tribute (Danegeld) for keeping the Vikings out of Neustria.
- Carloman, eldest son of King Louis the German, revolts against his father. He is captured, but manages to escape to the Ostmark (or 861).
- First raid of the Hungarians in the Carpathian Basin at the request of Rastislav of Moravia against the East Frankish Kingdom.
- Viking forces sack Cologne.

====== Britain ======
- April 13 – King Donald I of Scotland dies after a 4-year reign. He is succeeded by his nephew Constantine I, as ruler of Scotland.
- Áed Findliath is crowned High King of Ireland, after the death of Máel Sechnaill mac Maíl Ruanaid (until 879).

====== Eastern Europe ======
- The Varangians (called Rus'), under the leadership of Rurik, a Viking chieftain, arrive (with his brothers, Sineus and Truvor) at Staraya Ladoga. He builds a trade settlement near Novgorod (modern Russia), and founds the Rurik Dynasty.
- The first written record (according to the Primary Chronicle) is made of the towns of Belozersk and Murom (Northern Russia).

====== Abbasid Caliphate ======
- June – Caliph al-Muntasir dies after just a half-year reign. He is succeeded by al-Musta'in (son of prince Muhammad), as ruler of the Abbasid Caliphate.
- Ashot I ("the Great") is recognized as the 'Prince of Princes' of Armenia, by the Abbasids.

====== China ======
- Fan Chuo finishes his Manchu ("Book of the Southern Tribes"), during the Tang Dynasty.

==== By topic ====
====== Religion ======
- Constantine the Philosopher (alias Saint Cyril) invents the 42-letter Slavonic alphabet (Cyrillic script) as a tool for converting the Moravians to Christianity (approximate date).

=== 863 ===
==== By place ====
====== Byzantine Empire ======
- September 3 – Battle of Lalakaon: A Byzantine army confronts an invasion by Muslim forces, led by Umar al-Aqta, Emir of Malatya. The Muslims raid deep into Byzantine territory, reaching the Black Sea coast at the port city of Amisos. Petronas annihilates the Arabs near the River Lalakaon, in Paphlagonia (modern Turkey).

====== Europe ======
- January 25 – Emperor Louis II claims Provence, after the death of his brother Charles. King Lothair II receives Lower Burgundy and a part of the Jura Mountains.
- King Louis the German suppresses the revolt of his son Carloman (for the second time), who wants a partition (mainly of Bavaria) of the East Frankish Kingdom.
- Viking raiders again plunder Dorestad (modern Netherlands), a Frankish port on the mouth of the river Rhine. It thereafter disappears from the chronicles.
- Danish Vikings loot along the Rhine. They settle on an island near Cologne, but are driven off by the combined forces of Lothair II and the Saxons.
- The Christianization of Kievan Rus begins, ceasing the 63-year-long dominance of the Rus' Khaganate (approximate date).
- The first written record is made of Smolensk (according to the Primary Chronicle).
- The Byzantine empire invades Bulgaria in order to impose Orthodox Christianity on Boris I.

====== Britain ======
- King Osberht of Northumbria engages in a dispute for royal power, with a rival claimant named Ælla. After Osberht is replaced, Ælla wields power in Northumbria, but the civil war continues.

====== Asia ======
- Duan Chengshi, Chinese author and scholar, writes about the Chinese maritime trade and the Arab-run slave trade in East Africa.

====== Armenia ======
- 13 February – Dvin earthquake. It took place in the city of Dvin on 13 February, 863. During the 9th century, Dvin was the only "heavily populated" city in Muslim-dominated Armenia. The city was part of the wider Abbasid Caliphate, and had a multiethnic population.

==== By topic ====
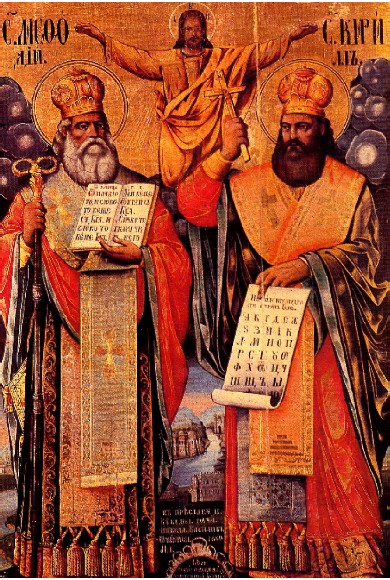
Cyril and Methodius (left) arrive in Moravia

====== Religion ======
- Pope Nicholas I sends archbishops Gunther and Theotgaud to a synod of Metz, which confirms the permission given to King Lothair II of Lotharingia to remarry.
- The Byzantine missionaries Cyril and Methodius arrive with a few disciples in Moravia, by request of Prince Rastislav.
- Nicholas I excommunicates Patriarch Photios I of Constantinople.

=== 864 ===
==== By place ====
====== Europe ======
- Spring – Emperor Louis II (the Younger) marches with a Frankish army against Rome. While en route to the papal city, he becomes ill, and decides to make peace with Pope Nicholas I.
- July 25 – Edict of Pistres: King Charles the Bald orders defensive measures against the Vikings. He creates a large force of cavalry, which inspires the beginning of French chivalry.
- Viking raiders, led by Olaf the White, arrive in Scotland from the Viking settlement of Dublin (Ireland). He rampages the country, until his defeat in battle by King Constantine I.
- Robert the Strong, margrave of Neustria, attacks the Loire Vikings in a successful campaign. Other Viking raiders plunder the cities of Limoges and Clermont, in Aquitaine.
- King Louis the German invades Moravia, crossing the Danube River to besiege the civitas Dowina (identified, although not unanimously, with Devín Castle in Slovakia).
- Pepin II joins the Vikings in an attack on Toulouse. He is captured while besieging the Frankish city. Pepin is deposed as king of Aquitaine, and imprisoned in Senlis.
- September 13 – Pietro Tradonico dies after a 28-year reign. He is succeeded by Orso I Participazio, who becomes doge of Venice.
- King Alfonso III conquers Porto from the Emirate of Cordoba. This is the end of the direct Muslim domination of the Douro region.

====== Asia ======
- Mount Fuji, located on Honshu Island, erupts for 10 days, in an event known as the Jōgan eruption (Japan).
- Hasan ibn Zayd establishes the Zaydid Dynasty, and is recognized as ruler of Tabaristan (Northern Iran).

==== By topic ====
====== Religion ======
- The Christianization of Bulgaria begins: Boris I, ruler (Knyaz) of the Bulgarian Empire, is converted to Orthodox Christianity. His family and high-ranking dignitaries accept the Orthodox faith at the capital, Pliska - from this point onwards the rulers of the Bulgarian Empire are known as ‘Tsars’ rather than ‘Khans’.

=== 865 ===
==== By place ====
====== Europe ======
- King Louis the German divides the East Frankish Kingdom among his three sons. Carloman receives Bavaria (with more lands along the Inn River). He gives Saxony to Louis the Younger (with Franconia, and Thuringia) and Swabia (with Raetia) to Charles the Fat. Louis arranges marriages into the local aristocracy, for his sons to hold important territories along the frontiers.
- King Lothair II, threatened with excommunication, takes back his first wife, Teutberga. She expresses her desire for an annulment, but this is refused by Pope Nicholas I.
- Boris I, ruler (knyaz) of the Bulgarian Empire, suppresses a revolt, and orders the execution of 52 leading boyars, along with their whole families.

====== Britain ======
- The Great Heathen Army (probably no more than 1,000 men) of Vikings, led by Ivar the Boneless and Halfdan Ragnarsson, invades East Anglia. King Edmund of East Anglia buys peace with a supply of horses.
- Viking king Ragnar Lodbrok is captured by the Northumbrians in battle, and killed by being thrown into a pit filled with venomous snakes, on the orders of King Ælla of Northumbria.
- Autumn – King Æthelberht of Wessex dies after a 5-year reign, and is buried at Sherborne Abbey (Dorset). He is succeeded by his brother Æthelred I, as ruler of Wessex.

====== Abbasid Caliphate ======
- Caliphal Civil War: An armed conflict starts between the rival Muslim caliphs al-Musta'in and al-Mu'tazz. They fight to determine who takes control over the Abbasid Caliphate (until 866).

==== By topic ====
====== Religion ======
- Kassia, a Byzantine abbess and hymnographer, dies. She is one of the first Early Medieval composers of many hymns.

=== 866 ===
==== By place ====
====== Byzantine Empire ======
- April 21 – Bardas, the regent of the Byzantine Empire, is murdered by Basil the Macedonian at Miletus, while conducting a large-scale expedition against the Saracen stronghold of Crete.
- May 26 – Basil the Macedonian is crowned co-emperor of the Byzantine Empire, and is adopted by the much younger Michael III.

====== Europe ======
- May 27 – King Ordoño I, ruler of the Kingdom of Asturias, dies after a 16-year reign. He is succeeded by his son, Alfonso III, who later is referred to as "Alfonso the Great".
- July 2 – Battle of Brissarthe: Frankish forces, led by Robert the Strong, are defeated by a joint Breton-Viking army.
- Louis II, Holy Roman Emperor, defeats the Saracen invaders who are ravaging southern Italy.

====== Britain ======
- The Great Heathen Army of the Vikings rides north to Northumbria. The Northumbrians are preoccupied with a civil war, and the Danes enter York unopposed.

==== Italy ====
- An army in Lucera is assembled by orders of Louis II in preparation for an attack on the Emirate of Bari.

====== Abbasid Caliphate ======
- October 17 – Caliph al-Musta'in is put to death, after a 4-year reign. He is succeeded by al-Mu'tazz, who becomes the youngest Abbasid caliph to assume power.
- The Kharijite revolt against the Abbasid Caliphate begins in Al-Jazira (Upper Mesopotamia), which will last for 30 years.

====== Japan ======
- Fujiwara no Yoshifusa becomes regent (sesshō) to assist the child emperor Seiwa, starting the Fujiwara regency.

==== By topic ====
====== Religion ======
- Boris I, ruler (knyaz) of the Bulgarian Empire, sends a diplomatic mission, led by the Bulgarian nobleman Peter, to Rome, in an effort to renew ties with the West.
- Pope Nicholas I orders that all Catholics should abstain from eating the "flesh, blood, or marrow" of warm-blooded animals on Wednesdays and Fridays.
- Pope Nicholas I forbids the use of torture in prosecutions for witchcraft (approximate date).

=== 867 ===
==== By place ====
====== Byzantine Empire ======
- September 24 – Emperor Michael III is murdered, by order of his co-emperor Basil I. Basil becomes sole ruler (basileus) of the Byzantine Empire, and founds the Macedonian Dynasty (until 1056). Basil rebuilds the Byzantine army and navy, in an effort to restore the empire.

====== Europe ======
- August – Treaty of Compiègne: King Charles the Bald cedes the Cotentin Peninsula to Salomon, duke ('king') of Brittany, after he had sent his son-in-law Pascweten to negotiate a peace. Charles orders the fortification of the cities of Tours, Le Mans and Compiègne.
- Bořivoj I declares himself duke (knyaz) of Bohemia, and founds the Přemyslid Dynasty (approximate date).

====== Britain ======
- Vikings or "Danes" (the two terms were often used interchangeably at the time), comprising the Great Heathen Army, advance northward from bases in the Kingdom of East Anglia, into the Anglo-Saxon Kingdom of Northumbria.
  - Deira, the southernmost part of Northumbria, is conquered by the Vikings. Ivar the Boneless, one of their leaders, installs a puppet king of Northumbria, Ecgberht I.
  - The rival monarchs of Northumbria, Ælla and Osberht, join forces in an attempt to expel the Great Heathen Army, but are defeated in battle by Ivar the Boneless and Halfdan Ragnarsson. Osberht is killed in battle, while Ælla is reportedly captured, before being subject to the blood eagle: a combined method of torture and execution.
  - Surviving members of the Northumbrian court flee into the northernmost part of the kingdom, Bernicia.

==== By topic ====
====== Religion ======
- The Council of Constantinople is held (presided over by Patriarch Photius), which anathematizes the use of the Filioque clause in the Creed, and also Pope Nicholas I, for his attacks on the work of Greek missionaries in Bulgaria.
- September – Photius I ("the Great"), patriarch of Constantinople, is removed from office and banished. Ignatius is reinstated as patriarch by Basil I.
- November 13 – Pope Nicholas I dies after a 9-year reign. He is succeeded by Adrian II (also referred to as Hadrian II), as the 106th pope of Rome.

=== 868 ===
==== By place ====
====== Europe ======
- King Charles the Bald meets his brother Louis the German at Metz. They agree to a partition of Lotharingia, which belonged to former emperor Lothair I (now in possession of his sons Lothair II and Louis II).
- Salomon, duke ('king') of Brittany, leads a joint campaign against the Loire Vikings. He is forced to defend southeastern Brittany unaided, and mobilizes levies raised at Poitiers to defeat the Vikings.
- Al-Andalus: The city of Mérida rises against the Umayyad rule. Emir Muhammad I regains control, and has the walls of the city destroyed. He supports the rival creation of Badajoz in retaliation.
- The County of Portugal is established around the town of Portus Cale (present-day Porto) by Vímara Peres, an Asturian nobleman, after the reconquest from the Moors of the region north of the Douro River.
- Ratramnus, a Frankish monk and abbot of Corbie Abbey, writes Contra Graecorum Opposita.

====== Britain ======
- Alfred the Great marries Ealhswith (a daughter of Æthelred, known as Mucel, an ealdorman of the Gaini). He supports his brother Æthelred I, in his choice to form an alliance with Mercia.
- King Burgred of Mercia appeals to Æthelred I for help in resisting the Great Heathen Army. The Danes occupy Nottingham, and stay through the winter without any serious opposition.
- King Áed Findliath drives the invading Danes and Norwegians out of Ireland, after defeating them at the Battle of Killineery.

====== Africa ======
- September 15 – Ahmad ibn Tulun, a Turkish general, is sent to Egypt as governor, by the Abbasid caliph Al-Mu'tazz. He becomes the founder of the Tulunid Dynasty (until 905).
- Muslim Arab forces under Muhammad II, emir of the Aghlabid Dynasty (modern Tunisia), conquer the island of Malta and raid into the mainland of Italy.

====== Asia ======
- May 11 – The earliest extant printed book, an illustrated scroll of the Diamond Sutra ("Perfection of Wisdom"), unearthed at Dunhuang (Western China), is produced.

=== 869 ===
==== By place ====
====== Byzantine Empire ======
- Summer – Emperor Basil I allies with the Frankish emperor Louis II against the Saracens. He sends a Byzantine fleet of 400 ships (according to the Annales Bertiniani), under the command of Admiral Niketas Ooryphas, to support Louis (who is besieging the city port of Bari) and to clear the Adriatic Sea of Muslim raiders.
- The Hagia Sophia Basilica (church) in Constantinople suffers great damage during an earthquake, which makes the eastern half-dome collapse. Basil I orders it to be repaired.

====== Europe ======
- August 8 – Lothair II, King of Middle Francia (Lotharingia), dies at Piacenza, on his way home from meeting Pope Adrian II at Rome, to get assent for a divorce. Lotharingia is subsequently divided between Lothair's uncles, Charles the Bald of France and Louis the German.

====== Britain ======
- The Danes, led by Viking chieftain Ivar the Boneless, 'make peace' with the Mercians (by accepting Danegeld). Ivar leaves Nottingham on horseback, and returns to York.
- Autumn –The Great Heathen Army, led by Ivar the Boneless and Ubba, invades the Kingdom of East Anglia and plunders Peterborough. The Vikings take up winter quarters at Thetford.
- November 20 – Vikings conquer East Anglia, killing King Edmund the Martyr.

====== Arabian Empire ======
- The Zanj Rebellion: The Zanj (black slaves from East Africa), provoked by mercilessly harsh labor conditions in salt flats, and on the sugar and cotton plantations of southwestern Persia, revolt.
- Summer – Caliph Al-Mu'tazz is murdered by mutinous Muslim troops, after a 3-year reign. He is succeeded by Al-Muhtadi (a grandson of the late Al-Mu'tasim), as ruler of the Abbasid Caliphate.

====== Japan ======
- July 9 – The 869 Sanriku earthquake and associated tsunami devastate a large part of the Sanriku coast on the northeastern side of the island of Honshu.
- The first Gion Festival is held in order to combat an epidemic thought to be caused by an angry deity.

====== Mesoamerica ======
- The last monument ever erected at Tikal, Stela 11, is dedicated by ruler (ajaw) Jasaw Chan Kʼawiil II.

==== By topic ====
====== Religion ======
- October 5 – The Fourth Council of Constantinople, called by Basil I and Pope Adrian II, opens. The council will condemn Photius I and depose him as patriarch, reinstating his predecessor Ignatios.

== Significant people ==
- Rurik
- Al-Muntasir
- Al-Mu'tazz
- Al-Mu'ayyad
- Al-Muhtadi
- Pope Nicholas I
- Al-Musta'in
- Louis II, Holy Roman Emperor
- Ragnar Lodbrok
- Basil I
- Charles the Bald
- Louis the German
- Baldwin I of Flanders

== Births ==
860

- Bertila of Spoleto, queen of Italy (approximate date)
- Donald II, king of Scotland (approximate date)
- Georgios I, king of Makuria (approximate date)
- Ibn Abd Rabbih, Moorish writer and poet (d. 940)
- John X, pope of the Catholic Church (d. 928)
- Ludmila, Bohemian duchess regent and saint (approximate date)
- Odo I, king of the West Frankish Kingdom (or 859)
- Robert I, king of the West Frankish Kingdom (or 866)
- Sancho Garcés I, king of Pamplona (approximate date)
- Sergius III, pope of the Catholic Church (approximate date)
- Tudwal Gloff, Welsh prince (approximate date)
- Vasugupta, Indian writer and philosopher (d. 925)

861

- Abdullah ibn al-Mu'tazz, Muslim poet (d. 908)
- Abu Bakr Shibli, Muslim Sufi (d. 946)
- Al-Mu'tadid, Muslim caliph (or 854)
- Heongang, king of Silla (approximate date)

862

- June 8 – Xi Zong, emperor of the Tang Dynasty (d. 888)
- Li Cunxin, general of the Tang Dynasty (d. 902)
- Li Cunshen, general of Later Tang (d. 924)
- Wang Chuzhi, Chinese warlord (d. 922)
- Wang Shenzhi, founder of Min (Ten Kingdoms) (d. 925)
- Xiao Qing, chancellor of Later Liang (d. 930)
- Xu Wen, general and regent of Wu (d. 927)
- Yúnmén Wényǎn, Chinese Zen master (or 864)
- Zhou Ben, general of Wu (d. 938)

863

- Bertha, duchess regent of Lucca and Tuscany (d. 925)
- Li Decheng, general of Wu (Five Dynasties) (d. 940)
- Louis III, king of the West Frankish Kingdom (or 865)
- Shen Song, chancellor of Wuyue (d. 938)
- Wang Yanzhang, general of Later Liang (d. 923)

864

- Gu Quanwu, general of the Tang Dynasty (d. 931)
- Khumarawayh ibn Ahmad ibn Tulun, ruler of the Tulunid Dynasty (d. 896)
- Louis III, king of the West Frankish Kingdom (or 863)
- Muhammad ibn Ya'qub al-Kulayni, Muslim scholar (d. 941)
- Simeon I, ruler (tsar) of the Bulgarian Empire (or 865)
- Yúnmén Wényǎn, Chinese Zen master (or 862)

865

- Al-Nayrizi, Persian mathematician (d. 922)
- Baldwin II, Frankish margrave (approximate date)
- Jinseong, queen of Silla (approximate date)
- Lady Ren Neiming, Chinese noblewoman (d. 918)
- Louis III, king of the West Frankish Kingdom (or 863)
- Simeon I, ruler (khan) of the Bulgarian Empire (or 864)

866

- June 10 – Uda, emperor of Japan (d. 931)
- September 19 – Leo VI, Byzantine emperor (d. 912)
- Carloman II, king of the West Frankish Kingdom (approximate date)
- Robert I, king of the West Frankish Kingdom (d. 923)
- Yao Yi, chancellor of Later Tang (d. 940)

867

- October 10 – Li Siyuan, emperor of Later Tang (d. 933)
- Kyŏn Hwŏn, king of Later Baekje (Korea) (d. 936)
- Pribislav, prince (knyaz) of Serbia (approximate date)
- Stephen I, patriarch of Constantinople (d. 893)
- Zhao Zong, emperor of the Tang Dynasty (d. 904)
- Zhu Jin, Chinese warlord (d. 918)

868

- Ch'oe Ŏn-wi, Korean minister and calligrapher (d. 944)
- Muhammad ibn Dawud al-Zahiri, Muslim theologian (d. 909)
- Théodrate of Troyes, Frankish queen (d. 903)
- Xu Jie, Chinese officer and chancellor (d. 943)

869

- January 2 – Yōzei, emperor of Japan (d. 949)
- Gung Ye, king of Hu Goguryeo (approximate date)
- Muhammad al-Mahdi, Muslim Twelver Shī‘ah Imām

== Deaths ==
860

- December 3 – Abbo, bishop of Auxerre
- December 20 – Æthelbald, king of Wessex
- Al-Abbās ibn Said al-Jawharī, Muslim mathematician
- 'Anbasah ibn Ishaq al-Dabbi, Muslim governor
- Athanasia of Aegina, Byzantine noblewoman
- Constantine Kontomytes, Byzantine general
- Govindasvāmi, Indian astronomer (approximate date)
- Guy I, duke of Spoleto (approximate date)
- Halfdan the Black, Norwegian nobleman
- Sedulius Scottus, Irish grammarian
- Tunberht, bishop of Lichfield (approximate date)

861

- Shuja also known as Umm Jaʽfar was the mother of Abbasid caliph Al-Mutawakkil.
- April 6 – Prudentius, bishop of Troyes
- December 11
  - Al-Mutawakkil, Abbasid caliph (b. 822), On the night of 11 December, about one hour after midnight, the Turk guards burst in the chamber where the Caliph and al-Fath were having supper. Al-Fath was killed trying to protect the Caliph, who was killed next. His son, Al-Muntasir, who now assumed the caliphate, initially claimed that al-Fath had murdered his father, and that he had been killed after; within a short time, however, the official story changed to al-Mutawakkil choking on his drink.
  - al-Fath ibn Khaqan, chief confidante and councillor of al-Mutawakkil
- Ahmad ibn Muhammad ibn Kathir al-Farghani, Persian astronomer
- Álvaro of Córdoba, Mozarab scholar and theologian
- Ansovinus, bishop of Camerino (approximate date)
- Bai Minzhong, chancellor of the Tang Dynasty (b. 792)
- Gladilanus, Galician clergyman (approximate date)
- Gregory of Khandzta, Georgian archimandrite (b. 759)
- Heonan, king of Silla (Korea)
- Princess Ito of Japan
- Lando I, count of Capua
- Meinrad of Einsiedeln, German hermit and martyr
- Pribina, Slavic prince (approximate date)
- Samuel of Kakheti, Georgian prince

862

- April 13 – Donald I, king of Scotland (b. 812)
- July 2 – Swithun, bishop of Winchester
- September 26 – Musa ibn Musa al-Qasawi, Muslim military leader (b. c. 790)
- Æthelred II, king of Northumbria
- Al-Muntasir, Muslim caliph (b. 837)
- Bugha al-Kabir, Muslim general
- Lupus Servatus, Frankish abbot (approximate date)
- Máel Sechnaill mac Maíl Ruanaid, High King of Ireland
- Ruarc mac Brain, king of Leinster (Ireland)
- Tahir ibn Abdallah, Muslim governor

863

- January 25 – Charles of Provence, Frankish king (b. 845)
- June 4 – Charles, archbishop of Mainz
- June 6 – Abu Musa Utamish, Muslim vizier
- October 4 – Turpio, Frankish nobleman
- Ali ibn Yahya al-Armani, Muslim governor
- Bivin of Gorze, Frankish nobleman
- Daniél ua Líahaiti, Irish abbot and poet
- Duan Chengshi, Chinese official and scholar
- Karbeas, leader of the Paulicians
- Mucel, bishop of Hereford (approximate date)
- Muirecán mac Diarmata, king of Leinster
- Umar al-Aqta, emir of Melitene
- Yahya ibn Muhammad, Idrisid emir of Morocco

864

- September 13 – Pietro Tradonico, doge of Venice
- Al-Fadl ibn Marwan, Muslim vizier
- Al-Fadl ibn Qarin al-Tabari, Muslim governor
- Arnold of Gascony, Frankish nobleman
- Bi Xian, chancellor of the Tang Dynasty (b. 802)
- Ennin, Japanese priest and traveler
- Hucbert, Frankish nobleman (b. 820)
- Laura, Spanish abbess
- Lorcán mac Cathail, king of Uisneach (Ireland)
- Muhammad ibn al-Fadl al-Jarjara'i, Muslim vizier (or 865)
- Pei Xiu, chancellor of the Tang Dynasty (b. 791)
- Sancho II, count of Gascony (approximate date)
- Sergius I, duke of Naples
- Trpimir I, duke (knez) of Croatia
- Yahya ibn Umar, Muslim imam (or 865)

865

- February 3 – Ansgar, Frankish monk and archbishop (b. 801)
- March 8 – Rudolf of Fulda, German theologian
- November 11 – Petronas, Byzantine general
- December 26 – Zheng, empress of the Tang dynasty
- Æthelberht, king of Wessex
- Antony the Younger, Byzantine governor and saint (b. 785)
- Deshan Xuanjian, Chinese Zen Buddhist monk
- Gao Qu, chancellor of the Tang dynasty
- Kassia, Byzantine abbess and hymnographer
- Khurshid, ruler (shah) of Daylam
- Liu Gongquan, Chinese calligrapher (b. 778)
- Lothair the Lame, Frankish abbot
- Muhammad ibn al-Fadl al-Jarjara'i, Muslim vizier (or 864)
- Pepin II, king of Aquitaine (approximate date)
- Ragnar Lodbrok, king of Denmark and Sweden
- Raymond I, count of Toulouse
- Rorgon II, count of Maine (approximate date)
- Tigernach mac Fócartai, king of Lagore (Ireland)
- Wenilo, Frankish archbishop
- Xiao Zhi, chancellor of the Tang dynasty
- Yahya ibn Umar, Muslim imam (or 864)

866

- April 21 – Bardas, Byzantine chief minister and regent
- May 27 – Ordoño I, king of Asturias
- June 21 – Rodulf, Frankish archbishop
- July 2 – Robert the Strong, Frankish nobleman
- July 16 – Irmgard, Frankish abbess
- October 17 – Al-Musta'in, Abbasid caliph
- Adelaide of Tours, Frankish noblewoman
- Al-Mu'ayyad, Abbasid prince
- Charles the Child, king of Aquitaine
- Eberhard, duke of Friuli
- Emenon, Frankish nobleman
- Hungerus Frisus, bishop of Utrecht
- Linji Yixuan, Chinese monk and founder of the Linji school
- Liudolf, duke of Saxony
- Ranulf I, Frankish nobleman (b. 820)
- Robert, Frankish nobleman (b. 834)
- Rudolph, Frankish nobleman
- Wang Shaoyi, general of the Tang Dynasty
- Yahya ibn Yahya, Idrisid emir of Morocco

867

- March 21 – Ælla, king of Northumbria
- March 21 – Osberht, king of Northumbria
- November 13 – Nicholas I, pope of the Catholic Church
- Auisle, Viking leader (approximate date)
- Cormac mac Connmhach, Irish monk and scribe
- Donnchad mac Aedacain, king of Uisneach (Ireland)
- Eahlstan, bishop of Sherborne
- Fujiwara no Yoshimi, Japanese nobleman (b. 813)
- Fujiwara no Yoshisuke, Japanese statesman (b. 813)
- Galindo Aznárez I, count of Aragon
- Gottschalk of Orbais, German monk and theologian
- Lazarus Zographos, Byzantine monk and painter
- Louis, Frankish archchancellor and abbot
- Michael III, emperor of the Byzantine Empire (b. 840)
- Muhammad ibn Abdallah, Abbasid governor
- Qarin I, ruler (spahbed) of the Bavand Dynasty
- Wasif al-Turki, Abbasid general
- Wulfsige, bishop of Lichfield

868

- Ali al-Hadi, tenth Shia Imam
- Al-Jahiz, Afro-Muslim scholar and writer (b. 776)
- Bugha al-Sharabi, Turkish military leader
- Conwoïon, Breton abbot (approximate date)
- Minamoto no Makoto, Japanese prince (b. 810)
- Muzahim ibn Khaqan, Muslim governor
- Stephania, wife of Adrian II
- Theotgaud, archbishop of Trier
- Yang Shou, chancellor of the Tang Dynasty
- Yu Xuanji, Chinese poet (or 869)

869

- February 14 – Cyril, Byzantine missionary and bishop
- August 8 – Lothair II, king of Lotharingia (b. 835)
- September 8 – Ahmad ibn Isra'il al-Anbari, Muslim vizier
- September 18 – Wenilo, Frankish archbishop
- October 14 – Pang Xun, Chinese rebel leader
- November 20 (or 870) – Edmund the Martyr, king of East Anglia
- Al-Darimi, Muslim scholar and imam
- Al-Hakim al-Tirmidhi, Muslim jurist (approximate date)
- Al-Jahiz, Afro-Muslim scholar and writer (or 868)
- Al-Mu'tazz, Muslim caliph (b. 847)
- Dongshan Liangjie, Chinese Buddhist teacher (b. 807)
- Dúnlaing mac Muiredaig, king of Leinster (Ireland)
- Ermentrude of Orléans, queen of the Franks (b. 823)
- Gundachar, count (or margrave) of Carinthia
- Leuthard II, Frankish count (or 858)
- Rothad of Soissons, Frankish bishop
- Shapur ibn Sahl, Persian physician
- Solomon, Frankish count (approximate date)
- Yu Xuanji, Chinese poet (or 868)
