= 864 =

Calendar year

864 in various calendars
- Gregorian calendar: 864; DCCCLXIV
- Ab urbe condita: 1617
- Armenian calendar: 313; ԹՎ ՅԺԳ
- Assyrian calendar: 5614
- Balinese saka calendar: 785–786
- Bengali calendar: 270–271
- Berber calendar: 1814
- Buddhist calendar: 1408
- Burmese calendar: 226
- Byzantine calendar: 6372–6373
- Chinese calendar: 癸未年 (Water Goat); 3561 or 3354 — to — 甲申年 (Wood Monkey); 3562 or 3355
- Coptic calendar: 580–581
- Discordian calendar: 2030
- Ethiopian calendar: 856–857
- Hebrew calendar: 4624–4625
- Hindu calendars
- Vikram Samvat: 920–921
- Shaka Samvat: 785–786
- Kali Yuga: 3964–3965
- Holocene calendar: 10864
- Iranian calendar: 242–243
- Islamic calendar: 249–250
- Japanese calendar: Jōgan 6 (貞観６年)
- Javanese calendar: 761–762
- Julian calendar: 864; DCCCLXIV
- Korean calendar: 3197
- Minguo calendar: 1048 before ROC 民前1048年
- Nanakshahi calendar: −604
- Seleucid era: 1175/1176 AG
- Thai solar calendar: 1406–1407
- Tibetan calendar: ཆུ་མོ་ལུག་ལོ་ (female Water-Sheep); 990 or 609 or −163 — to — ཤིང་ཕོ་སྤྲེ་ལོ་ (male Wood-Monkey); 991 or 610 or −162

Year 864 (DCCCLXIV) was a leap year starting on Saturday of the Julian calendar.

== Events ==
=== By place ===
==== Europe ====
- Spring – Emperor Louis II (the Younger) marches with a Frankish army against Rome. While en route to the papal city, he becomes ill, and decides to make peace with Pope Nicholas I.
- July 25 – Edict of Pistres: King Charles the Bald orders defensive measures against the Vikings. He creates a large force of cavalry, which inspires the beginning of French chivalry.
- Viking raiders, led by Olaf the White, arrive in Scotland from the Viking settlement of Dublin (Ireland). He rampages the country, until his defeat in battle by King Constantine I.
- Robert the Strong, margrave of Neustria, attacks the Loire Vikings in a successful campaign. Other Viking raiders plunder the cities of Limoges and Clermont, in Aquitaine.
- King Louis the German invades Moravia, crossing the Danube River to besiege the civitas Dowina (identified, although not unanimously, with Devín Castle in Slovakia).
- Pepin II joins the Vikings in an attack on Toulouse. He is captured while besieging the Frankish city. Pepin is deposed as king of Aquitaine, and imprisoned in Senlis.
- September 13 – Pietro Tradonico dies after a 28-year reign. He is succeeded by Orso I Participazio, who becomes doge of Venice.
- King Alfonso III conquers Porto from the Emirate of Cordoba. This is the end of the direct Muslim domination of the Douro region.

==== Asia ====
- Jōgan eruption (Japan): Mount Fuji, located on Honshu Island, erupts for 10 days.
- Hasan ibn Zayd establishes the Zaydid Dynasty, and is recognized as ruler of Tabaristan (Northern Iran).

=== By topic ===
==== Religion ====
- The Christianization of Bulgaria begins: Boris I, Knyaz of the Bulgarian Empire, is converted to Orthodox Christianity. His family and high-ranking dignitaries accept the Orthodox faith at the capital, Pliska - from this point onwards the rulers of the Bulgarian Empire are known as ‘Tsars’ rather than ‘Khans’.

== Births ==
- Gu Quanwu, general of the Tang Dynasty (d. 931)
- Khumarawayh ibn Ahmad ibn Tulun, ruler of the Tulunid Dynasty (d. 896)
- Louis III, king of the West Frankish Kingdom (or 863)
- Muhammad ibn Ya'qub al-Kulayni, Muslim scholar (d. 941)
- Simeon I, ruler (tsar) of the Bulgarian Empire (or 865)
- Yúnmén Wényǎn, Chinese Zen master (or 862)

== Deaths ==
- September 13 – Pietro Tradonico, doge of Venice
- Al-Fadl ibn Marwan, Muslim vizier
- Al-Fadl ibn Qarin al-Tabari, Muslim governor
- Arnold of Gascony, Frankish nobleman
- Bi Xian, chancellor of the Tang Dynasty (b. 802)
- Ennin, Japanese priest and traveler
- Hucbert, Frankish nobleman (b. 820)
- Laura, Spanish abbess
- Lorcán mac Cathail, king of Uisneach (Ireland)
- Muhammad ibn al-Fadl al-Jarjara'i, Muslim vizier (or 865)
- Pei Xiu, chancellor of the Tang Dynasty (b. 791)
- Sancho II, count of Gascony (approximate date)
- Sergius I, duke of Naples
- Trpimir I, duke (knez) of Croatia
- Yahya ibn Umar, Muslim imam (or 865)
