= 860 =

Calendar year

860 in various calendars
- Gregorian calendar: 860; DCCCLX
- Ab urbe condita: 1613
- Armenian calendar: 309; ԹՎ ՅԹ
- Assyrian calendar: 5610
- Balinese saka calendar: 781–782
- Bengali calendar: 266–267
- Berber calendar: 1810
- Buddhist calendar: 1404
- Burmese calendar: 222
- Byzantine calendar: 6368–6369
- Chinese calendar: 己卯年 (Earth Rabbit); 3557 or 3350 — to — 庚辰年 (Metal Dragon); 3558 or 3351
- Coptic calendar: 576–577
- Discordian calendar: 2026
- Ethiopian calendar: 852–853
- Hebrew calendar: 4620–4621
- Hindu calendars
- Vikram Samvat: 916–917
- Shaka Samvat: 781–782
- Kali Yuga: 3960–3961
- Holocene calendar: 10860
- Iranian calendar: 238–239
- Islamic calendar: 245–246
- Japanese calendar: Jōgan 2 (貞観２年)
- Javanese calendar: 757–758
- Julian calendar: 860; DCCCLX
- Korean calendar: 3193
- Minguo calendar: 1052 before ROC 民前1052年
- Nanakshahi calendar: −608
- Seleucid era: 1171/1172 AG
- Thai solar calendar: 1402–1403
- Tibetan calendar: ས་མོ་ཡོས་ལོ་ (female Earth-Hare); 986 or 605 or −167 — to — ལྕགས་ཕོ་འབྲུག་ལོ་ (male Iron-Dragon); 987 or 606 or −166

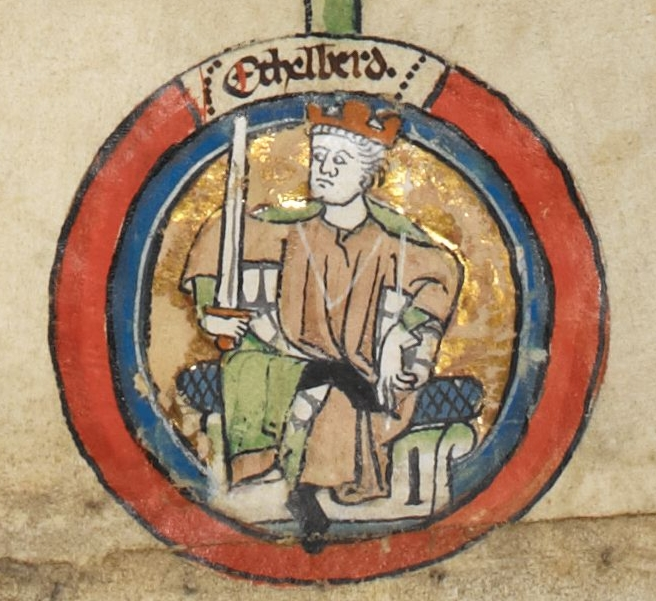
King Æthelberht of Wessex (c. 836–865)

Year 860 (DCCCLX) was a leap year starting on Monday of the Julian calendar.

== Events ==
=== By place ===
==== Byzantine Empire ====
- June 18 – Byzantine–Rus' War: A fleet of about 200 Rus' vessels sails into the Bosphorus, and starts pillaging the suburbs of Constantinople. The raiders set homes on fire, and drown and kill the citizens. Unable to do anything to repel the invaders, Patriarch Photios I urges his flock to implore the Theotokos to save the Byzantine capital. Having devastated the suburbs, the Rus' Vikings pass into the Sea of Marmara and attack the Isles of the Princes, plundering the local monasteries.

==== Europe ====
- King Charles the Bald gives the order to build fortified bridges across the Seine and Loire Rivers, to protect Paris and the Frankish heartland against Viking raids. He hires the services of Weland, a Viking chieftain based on the Somme, to attack the Seine Vikings at their base on the Isle of Oissel. Weland besieges the Vikings—they offer him a huge bribe (6,000 pounds of silver) to let them escape.
- Summer – The Viking chieftains Hastein and Björn Ironside ravage upstream and move to Italy, sacking Luna (believing it to be Rome). They sail up the River Arno to sack the cities of Pisa and Fiesole (Tuscany).
- Summer – Viking raiders led by Weland sail to England and attack Winchester (the capital of Wessex), which is set ablaze. He spreads inland, but is defeated by West Saxon forces, who deprive him of all he has gained.
- December 20 – King Æthelbald of Wessex dies after a 2½-year reign. He is succeeded by his brother, sub-king Æthelberht of Kent, who becomes sole ruler of Wessex.

==== Iberian Peninsula ====
- Muhammad I, Umayyad emir of Córdoba, invades Pamplona (Pyrenees), and captures Crown Prince Fortún Garcés in Milagro, along with his daughter Onneca Fortúnez, and takes them as hostages to Córdoba.

=== By topic ===
==== Art ====
- Lusterware tiles, that decorated the mihrab of the Mosque of Uqba at Kairouan (modern Tunisia), are made (approximate date).

==== Communication ====
- The Japanese alphabet Hiragana becomes more popular in Japan. The phonetic alphabet will be further simplified, and reduced to 51 basic characters (approximate date).

==== Religion ====
- Byzantine missionaries Cyril and Methodius arrive in Khazaria.
- Michael I succeeds Sophronius I, as patriarch of Alexandria.

== Births ==
- Bertila of Spoleto, queen of Italy (approximate date)
- Donald II, king of Scotland (approximate date)
- Georgios I, king of Makuria (approximate date)
- Ibn Abd Rabbih, Moorish writer and poet (d. 940)
- John X, pope of the Catholic Church (d. 928)
- Ludmila, Bohemian duchess regent and saint (approximate date)
- Odo I, king of the West Frankish Kingdom (or 859)
- Robert I, king of the West Frankish Kingdom (or 866)
- Sancho Garcés I, king of Pamplona (approximate date)
- Sergius III, pope of the Catholic Church (approximate date)
- Tudwal Gloff, Welsh prince (approximate date)
- Vasugupta, Indian writer and philosopher (d. 925)

== Deaths ==
- December 3 – Abbo, bishop of Auxerre
- December 20 – Æthelbald, king of Wessex
- Al-Abbās ibn Said al-Jawharī, Muslim mathematician
- 'Anbasah ibn Ishaq al-Dabbi, Muslim governor
- Athanasia of Aegina, Byzantine noblewoman
- Constantine Kontomytes, Byzantine general
- Govindasvāmi, Indian astronomer (approximate date)
- Guy I, duke of Spoleto (approximate date)
- Halfdan the Black, Norwegian nobleman
- Sedulius Scottus, Irish grammarian
- Tunberht, bishop of Lichfield (approximate date)
