= Muhammad ibn al-Zayyat =

Abbasid vizier and court official (died c.847)

Muhammad ibn al-Zayyat محمد بن الزيات
- Born: Abbasid Caliphate
- Died: c. 847; Samarra, Abbasid Caliphate
- Other names: Ibn al-Zayyāt, Muḥammad ibn ʿAbd al-Malik
- Occupations: Abbasid vizier and Court official
- Years active: Under Al-Mu'tasim from (836 to 842); Under Al-Wathiq from (842 to 847)
- Known for: Wealthy merchant who became a court official and served as vizier of the Abbasid caliphs, al-Mu'tasim and al-Wathiq.
- Father: Abd al-Malik

Muḥammad ibn ʿAbd al-Malik, better known as Ibn al-Zayyāt (Arabic: ابن الزيات), was a wealthy merchant who became a court official and served as vizier of the Abbasid caliphs al-Mu'tasim, al-Wathiq, and al-Mutawakkil, from 836 until his downfall and death by torture in 847.

== Life ==
Muhammad ibn al-Zayyat belonged to a wealthy family of merchants. Sources differ regarding his family's origin; some state they were of Arab descent, while James E. Montgomery suggests a probable Persian origin based on his grandfather's geographic roots. His father, Abd al-Malik, had made a fortune as an oil trader (whence his sobriquet al-Zayyāt) in Baghdad at the time of al-Ma'mun (r. 813–833), and became involved in the lucrative government contracts for tents, ceremonial parasols (al-mushammas), and riding equipment. Muhammad succeeded his father in these activities. By the end of al-Mamun's reign, Ibn al-Zayyat had become secretary in the caliphal chancellery.

=== Career under al-Mu'tasim and al-Wathiq ===
According to al-Tabari, al-Mu'tasim's first vizier, al-Fadl ibn Marwan, upbraided Ibn al-Zayyat for daring to appear at court in ceremonial garb, with the black Abbasid robes (durrāʿah) and girt sword, although he was "only a trader". Al-Fadl also tried to have Dulayl ibn Ya'qub al-Nasrani examine Ibn al-Zayyat's financial activities for irregularities, but Dulayl was lenient and did not confiscate anything from Ibn al-Zayyat. In 836, however, al-Mu'tasim dismissed al-Fadl, and appointed Ibn al-Zayyat in his place. He would continue to hold the vizierate for the remainder of al-Mu'tasim's reign, as well as the reign of al-Wathiq (r. 842–847), and into the reign of al-Mutawakkil (r. 847–861), who had him executed.

As vizier, Ibn al-Zayyat became one of the leading men of the state, and the chief civilian minister alongside the head qādī, Ahmad ibn Abi Duwad, with whom he entertained a fierce personal rivalry. He was responsible for much of the construction work on al-Mu'tasim's new capital, Samarra. In 840 he was the chief prosecutor in the show trial against al-Afshin, prince of Ushrusana and until then one of the leading military commanders of the regime; al-Afshin was accused, among other things, of being a false Muslim, and of being accorded divine status by his subjects in his native Ushrusana. Despite putting up an able and eloquent defence, al-Afshin was found guilty and thrown into prison. He died soon after, either of starvation or of poison; his body was publicly gibbeted in front of the palace gates, burned, and thrown in the Tigris.

When al-Mu'tasim died in January 842, the throne passed to his son, al-Wathiq. Real power however lay with al-Mu'tasim's coterie of leading officials, Ibn al-Zayyat, Ibn Abi Duwad, and the Turkish generals Ashinas, Itakh, and Wasif. In 843/4, he is said by some sources to have been responsible for the heavy fines imposed by the Caliph on several of the secretaries in the central government, in an effort to raise money to pay the Turkish troops, and at the same time reduce the power of the leading Turkish commanders, such as Itakh and Ashinas, since most of the secretaries arrested and forced to pay were in their service. In the process, Ibn al-Zayyat became notorious for the severity and cruelty with which he treated the prisoners, torturing them with a device of his own invention, the tannur ("oven"), a kind of iron maiden. In 845, he received a Byzantine embassy, with whom he negotiated about a prisoner exchange, which was held in September of the same year under the auspices of Khaqan al-Khadim.

Ibn al-Zayyat was also an ardent patron of learning and science, and promoted the translation movement of Greek authors then under way; thus he commissioned Ishaq ibn Hunayn to translate works of Galen. Like al-Ma'mun, he was rumoured to be a zindīq, which normally meant "Manichaean", but was also used a shorthand by orthodox Sunni writers to denounce those with heterodox (pro-Shi'ite) beliefs. During his ascendancy, he was also the main patron of the theologian al-Jahiz.

=== Accession of al-Mutawakkil, downfall and death ===
When al-Wathiq died unexpectedly in August 847, Ibn al-Zayyat, Ibn Abi Duwad, Wasif, Itakh, and a few other leading officials assembled to determine his successor. Ibn al-Zayyat initially proposed al-Wathiq's son Muhammad (the future al-Muhtadi), but due to his youth he was passed over, and instead the council chose another of al-Mu'tasim's sons, the 26-year-old Ja'far, who became the caliph al-Mutawakkil.

Unbeknownst to Ibn al-Zayyat and the others, the new Caliph was resolved to destroy the coterie of his father's officials that controlled the state, and furthermore harboured a deep grudge against the vizier for the way he had been mistreated by him in the past. According to al-Tabari, when al-Wathiq had grown angry and suspicious at his brother, al-Mutawakkil had visited the vizier in hopes of persuading him to intercede with the Caliph. Not only had Ibn al-Zayyat kept the Abbasid prince waiting until he finished going through his correspondence, but even mocked him, in the presence of others, for coming to him seeking assistance. Not only that, but when the dejected prince left, Ibn al-Zayyat wrote to the Caliph to complain about his appearance, noting that he was dressed in effeminate fashion, and that his hair was too long. As a result, al-Wathiq had his brother summoned to court. Al-Mutawakkil came in a brand-new court dress, hoping to mollify the Caliph, but instead al-Wathiq ordered that his hair be shorn off, and al-Mutawakkil be struck in the face with it. In later times, al-Mutawakkil confessed that he had never been so distressed by anything in his life than by this public humiliation.

Thus, on 22 September 847, he sent Itakh to summon Ibn al-Zayyat as if for an audience. Instead, the vizier was brought to Itakh's residence, where his ceremonial garb—durrāʿah, sword, belt, and cap—were removed and he was placed under arrest. His servants were sent home on the pretext that the vizier would stay to drink wine with Itakh, but soon Itakh sent his own servants to the vizier's residence to confiscate his possessions; Itakh's men were reportedly impressed by how poor his furniture and lodgings were. Ibn al-Zayyat appointed al-Abbas ibn Ahmad ibn Rashid, the secretary of Ujayf ibn Anbasah, as his agent to supervise the sale of his estates. After a few days, he was put in fetters and tortured by being kept from sleeping, while another story—frequently retold by later authors as a morality tale—claimed that he was placed inside the tannur, the same device that he had devised. He died after a few days, and was buried unceremoniously, with his own sons denouncing him as a criminal to save themselves. Itakh himself was arrested and executed in 849, while Ibn Abi Duwad lasted until 851, when he and his son were dismissed, and their estates confiscated. These events marked the end of al-Mu'tasim's "old guard", and the full assumption of power by al-Mutawakkil, who reoriented Abbasid policy towards a traditionalist, orthodox Sunni position.

The historian of the Abbasid vizierate, Dominique Sourdel, summed up Ibn al-Zayyat's vizierate as "he had tried in vain to restrain the influence of the Turkish leaders, and left behind mainly a reputation for harshness and cruelty".

== Sources ==
- Bosworth, C. E., ed. (1991). The History of al-Ṭabarī, Volume XXXIII: Storm and Stress Along the Northern Frontiers of the ʿAbbāsid Caliphate: The Caliphate of al-Muʿtasim, A.D. 833–842/A.H. 218–227. SUNY Series in Near Eastern Studies. Albany, New York: State University of New York Press. ISBN 978-0-7914-0493-5.
- Kennedy, Hugh (2006). When Baghdad Ruled the Muslim World: The Rise and Fall of Islam's Greatest Dynasty. Cambridge, MA: Da Capo Press. ISBN 978-0-306814808.
- Kraemer, Joel L., ed. (1989). The History of al-Ṭabarī, Volume XXXIV: Incipient Decline: The Caliphates of al-Wāthiq, al-Mutawakkil and al-Muntaṣir, A.D. 841–863/A.H. 227–248. SUNY Series in Near Eastern Studies. Albany, New York: State University of New York Press. ISBN 978-0-88706-874-4.
- Montgomery, James E. (2007). "Al-Ğāḥiz and Hellenizing Philosophy". In D'Ancona, Cristina (ed.). The Libraries of the Neoplatonists. Leiden and Boston: BRILL. pp. 443–456. ISBN 9789047419471.
- Sourdel, Dominique (1971). "Ibn al-Zayyāt". In Lewis, B.; Ménage, V. L.; Pellat, Ch. & Schacht, J. (eds.). The Encyclopaedia of Islam, Second Edition. Volume III: H–Iram. Leiden: E. J. Brill. p. 974. doi:10.1163/1573-3912_islam_SIM_3423. OCLC 495469525.

Preceded by al-Fadl ibn Marwan	Vizier of the Abbasid Caliphate; 836–847	Succeeded by Muhammad ibn al-Fadl al-Jarjara'i
