= 865 =

Calendar year

865 in various calendars
Gregorian calendar	865; DCCCLXV
Ab urbe condita	1618
Armenian calendar	314; ԹՎ ՅԺԴ
Assyrian calendar	5615
Balinese saka calendar	786–787
Bengali calendar	271–272
Berber calendar	1815
Buddhist calendar	1409
Burmese calendar	227
Byzantine calendar	6373–6374
Chinese calendar	甲申年 (Wood Monkey); 3562 or 3355 — to — 乙酉年 (Wood Rooster); 3563 or 3356
Coptic calendar	581–582
Discordian calendar	2031
Ethiopian calendar	857–858
Hebrew calendar	4625–4626
- Hindu calendars
Vikram Samvat	921–922
Shaka Samvat	786–787
Kali Yuga	3965–3966
Holocene calendar	10865
Iranian calendar	243–244
Islamic calendar	250–251
Japanese calendar	Jōgan 7 (貞観７年)
Javanese calendar	762–763
Julian calendar	865; DCCCLXV
Korean calendar	3198
Minguo calendar	1047 before ROC 民前1047年
Nanakshahi calendar	−603
Seleucid era	1176/1177 AG
Thai solar calendar	1407–1408
Tibetan calendar	ཤིང་ཕོ་སྤྲེ་ལོ་ (male Wood-Monkey); 991 or 610 or −162 — to — ཤིང་མོ་བྱ་ལོ་ (female Wood-Bird); 992 or 611 or −161

A map of the Viking invasion in East Anglia with the routes of the Great Heathen Army.

Year 865 (DCCCLXV) was a common year starting on Monday of the Julian calendar.

== Events ==
=== By place ===
==== Europe ====
- King Louis the German divides the East Frankish Kingdom among his three sons. Carloman receives Bavaria (with more lands along the Inn River). He gives Saxony to Louis the Younger (with Franconia, and Thuringia) and Swabia (with Raetia) to Charles the Fat. Louis arranges marriages into the local aristocracy, for his sons to hold important territories along the frontiers.
- King Lothair II, threatened with excommunication, takes back his first wife, Teutberga. She expresses her desire for an annulment, but this is refused by Pope Nicholas I.
- Boris I, ruler (knyaz) of the Bulgarian Empire, suppresses a revolt, and orders the execution of 52 leading boyars, along with their whole families.

==== Britain ====
- The Great Heathen Army (probably no more than 1,000 men) of Vikings, led by Ivar the Boneless and Halfdan Ragnarsson, invades East Anglia. King Edmund of East Anglia buys peace with a supply of horses.
- Viking king Ragnar Lodbrok is captured by the Northumbrians in battle, and killed by being thrown into a pit filled with venomous snakes, on the orders of King Ælla of Northumbria.
- Autumn – King Æthelberht of Wessex dies after a 5-year reign, and is buried at Sherborne Abbey (Dorset). He is succeeded by his brother Æthelred I, as ruler of Wessex.

==== Abbasid Caliphate ====
- Caliphal Civil War: An armed conflict starts between the rival Muslim caliphs al-Musta'in and al-Mu'tazz. They fight to determine who takes control over the Abbasid Caliphate (until 866).

=== By topic ===
==== Religion ====
- Kassia, a Byzantine abbess and hymnographer, dies. She is one of the first Early Medieval composers of many hymns.

== Births ==
- Al-Nayrizi, Persian mathematician (d. 922)
- Baldwin II, Frankish margrave (approximate date)
- Jinseong, queen of Silla (approximate date)
- Lady Ren Neiming, Chinese noblewoman (d. 918)
- Louis III, king of the West Frankish Kingdom (or 863)
- Simeon I, ruler (khan) of the Bulgarian Empire (or 864)

== Deaths ==
- February 3 – Ansgar, Frankish monk and archbishop (b. 801)
- March 8 – Rudolf of Fulda, German theologian
- November 11 – Petronas, Byzantine general
- December 26 – Zheng, empress of the Tang dynasty
- Æthelberht, king of Wessex
- Antony the Younger, Byzantine governor and saint (b. 785)
- Deshan Xuanjian, Chinese Zen Buddhist monk
- Gao Qu, chancellor of the Tang dynasty
- Kassia, Byzantine abbess and hymnographer
- Khurshid, ruler (shah) of Daylam
- Liu Gongquan, Chinese calligrapher (b. 778)
- Lothair the Lame, Frankish abbot
- Muhammad ibn al-Fadl al-Jarjara'i, Muslim vizier (or 864)
- Pepin II, king of Aquitaine (approximate date)
- Ragnar Lodbrok, king of Denmark and Sweden
- Raymond I, count of Toulouse
- Rorgon II, count of Maine (approximate date)
- Tigernach mac Fócartai, king of Lagore (Ireland)
- Wenilo, Frankish archbishop
- Xiao Zhi, chancellor of the Tang dynasty
- Yahya ibn Umar, Muslim imam (or 864)
