= 863 =

Calendar year

863 in various calendars
Gregorian calendar	863; DCCCLXIII
Ab urbe condita	1616
Armenian calendar	312; ԹՎ ՅԺԲ
Assyrian calendar	5613
Balinese saka calendar	784–785
Bengali calendar	269–270
Berber calendar	1813
Buddhist calendar	1407
Burmese calendar	225
Byzantine calendar	6371–6372
Chinese calendar	壬午年 (Water Horse); 3560 or 3353 — to — 癸未年 (Water Goat); 3561 or 3354
Coptic calendar	579–580
Discordian calendar	2029
Ethiopian calendar	855–856
Hebrew calendar	4623–4624
- Hindu calendars
Vikram Samvat	919–920
Shaka Samvat	784–785
Kali Yuga	3963–3964
Holocene calendar	10863
Iranian calendar	241–242
Islamic calendar	248–249
Japanese calendar	Jōgan 5 (貞観５年)
Javanese calendar	760–761
Julian calendar	863; DCCCLXIII
Korean calendar	3196
Minguo calendar	1049 before ROC 民前1049年
Nanakshahi calendar	−605
Seleucid era	1174/1175 AG
Thai solar calendar	1405–1406
Tibetan calendar	ཆུ་ཕོ་རྟ་ལོ་ (male Water-Horse); 989 or 608 or −164 — to — ཆུ་མོ་ལུག་ལོ་ (female Water-Sheep); 990 or 609 or −163

Year 863 (DCCCLXIII) was a common year starting on Friday of the Julian calendar.

== Events ==
=== By place ===
==== Byzantine Empire ====
- September 3 – Battle of Lalakaon: A Byzantine army confronts an invasion by Muslim forces, led by Umar al-Aqta, Emir of Malatya. The Muslims raid deep into Byzantine territory, reaching the Black Sea coast at the port city of Amisos. Petronas annihilates the Arabs near the River Lalakaon, in Paphlagonia (modern Turkey).

==== Europe ====
- January 25 – Emperor Louis II claims Provence, after the death of his brother Charles. King Lothair II receives Lower Burgundy and a part of the Jura Mountains.
- King Louis the German suppresses the revolt of his son Carloman (for the second time), who wants a partition (mainly of Bavaria) of the East Frankish Kingdom.
- Viking raiders again plunder Dorestad (modern Netherlands), a Frankish port on the mouth of the river Rhine. It thereafter disappears from the chronicles.
- Danish Vikings loot along the Rhine. They settle on an island near Cologne, but are driven off by the combined forces of Lothair II and the Saxons.
- The Christianization of Kievan Rus begins, ceasing the 63-year-long dominance of the Rus' Khaganate (approximate date).
- The first written record is made of Smolensk (according to the Primary Chronicle).
- The Byzantine Empire invades Bulgaria in order to impose Orthodox Christianity on Boris I.

==== Britain ====
- King Osberht of Northumbria engages in a dispute for royal power, with a rival claimant named Ælla. After Osberht is replaced, Ælla wields power in Northumbria, but the civil war continues.

==== Asia ====
- Duan Chengshi, Chinese author and scholar, writes about the Chinese maritime trade and the Arab-run slave trade in East Africa.

==== Armenia ====
- 13 February – Dvin earthquake. It took place in the city of Dvin on 13 February, 863. During the 9th century, Dvin was the only "heavily populated" city in Muslim-dominated Armenia. The city was part of the wider Abbasid Caliphate, and had a multiethnic population.

=== By topic ===
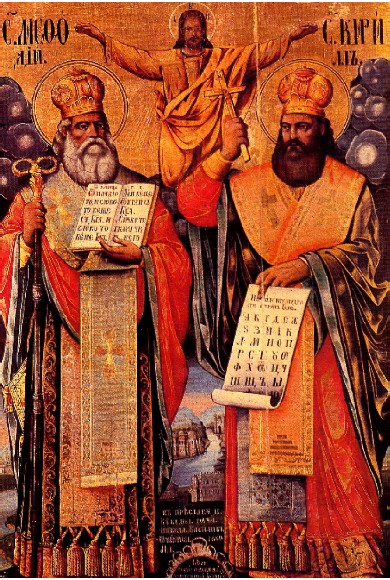
Cyril and Methodius (left) arrive in Moravia

==== Religion ====
- Pope Nicholas I sends archbishops Gunther and Theotgaud to a synod of Metz, which confirms the permission given to King Lothair II of Lotharingia to remarry.
- The Byzantine missionaries Cyril and Methodius arrive with a few disciples in Moravia, by request of Prince Rastislav.
- Nicholas I excommunicates Patriarch Photios I of Constantinople.

== Births ==
- Bertha, duchess regent of Lucca and Tuscany (d. 925)
- Li Decheng, general of Wu (Five Dynasties) (d. 940)
- Louis III, king of the West Frankish Kingdom (or 865)
- Shen Song, chancellor of Wuyue (d. 938)
- Wang Yanzhang, general of Later Liang (d. 923)

== Deaths ==
- January 25 – Charles of Provence, Frankish king (b. 845)
- June 4 – Charles, archbishop of Mainz
- June 6 – Abu Musa Utamish, Muslim vizier
- October 4 – Turpio, Frankish nobleman
- Ali ibn Yahya al-Armani, Muslim governor
- Bivin of Gorze, Frankish nobleman
- Daniél ua Líahaiti, Irish abbot and poet
- Duan Chengshi, Chinese official and scholar
- Karbeas, leader of the Paulicians
- Mucel, bishop of Hereford (approximate date)
- Muirecán mac Diarmata, king of Leinster
- Umar al-Aqta, emir of Melitene
- Yahya ibn Muhammad, Idrisid emir of Morocco
