= 931 =

Calendar year

931 in various calendars
- Gregorian calendar: 931; CMXXXI
- Ab urbe condita: 1684
- Armenian calendar: 380; ԹՎ ՅՁ
- Assyrian calendar: 5681
- Balinese saka calendar: 852–853
- Bengali calendar: 337–338
- Berber calendar: 1881
- Buddhist calendar: 1475
- Burmese calendar: 293
- Byzantine calendar: 6439–6440
- Chinese calendar: 庚寅年 (Metal Tiger); 3628 or 3421 — to — 辛卯年 (Metal Rabbit); 3629 or 3422
- Coptic calendar: 647–648
- Discordian calendar: 2097
- Ethiopian calendar: 923–924
- Hebrew calendar: 4691–4692
- Hindu calendars
- Vikram Samvat: 987–988
- Shaka Samvat: 852–853
- Kali Yuga: 4031–4032
- Holocene calendar: 10931
- Iranian calendar: 309–310
- Islamic calendar: 318–319
- Japanese calendar: Enchō 9 / Jōhei 1 (承平元年)
- Javanese calendar: 830–831
- Julian calendar: 931; CMXXXI
- Korean calendar: 3264
- Minguo calendar: 981 before ROC 民前981年
- Nanakshahi calendar: −537
- Seleucid era: 1242/1243 AG
- Thai solar calendar: 1473–1474
- Tibetan calendar: ལྕགས་ཕོ་སྟག་ལོ་ (male Iron-Tiger); 1057 or 676 or −96 — to — ལྕགས་མོ་ཡོས་ལོ་ (female Iron-Hare); 1058 or 677 or −95

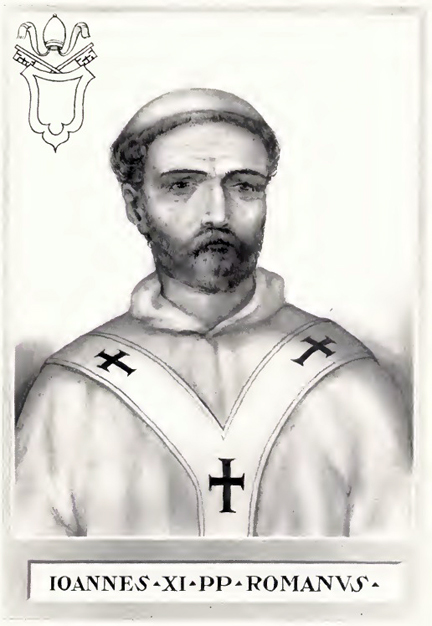
Pope John XI (910 - 935)

Year 931 (CMXXXI) was a common year starting on Saturday of the Julian calendar.

== Events ==
=== By place ===
==== North Africa ====
- The Umayyad Caliphate of Córdoba invades and conquers the city of Ceuta, which was ruled by the Berber dynasty Banu Isam.

==== Europe ====
- Spring – Hugh of Provence, king of Italy, cedes Lower Burgundy to Rudolph II, in return for Rudolf's renunciation of all claims to the Italian crown. He receives the imperial crown, and induces the Italian nobility to recognize his son Lothair II as the co-ruler of Lombardia (Regnum Italiae).
- King Harald Fairhair of Norway dies after a 59-year reign as the Scandinavian nation's first ruler. He divides the kingdom among his many sons (about 25 years ago) to bring peace. Unable to travel through the country - and perform his royal duties, Harald hands over power to his favorite son Eric Bloodaxe, who allegedly kills at least two of his brothers to gain the Norwegian throne that he will hold (approximate date).
- Rollo, duke of Normandy, dies at Rouen after an 11-year reign. He is the first leader of the Viking settlers to establish an independent dukedom (a vassal of the West Frankish Kingdom). His eldest son, William Longsword, becomes the second ruler of Normandy (approximate date).
- Ramiro II forces the abdication of his brother Alfonso IV and becomes king of León (Northern Spain). He has Alfonso and Fruela's three sons blinded in order to make them incapable of ruling.
- Ramiro II expands the border eastwards (nearly to the Pyrenees) and captures Burgos and the surrounding land. This land would soon be known as the County of Castile (approximate date).

==== England ====
- King Morgan Hen of Glywysing and Gwent (Wales) submits to the overlordship of King Æthelstan, and attends his court with Kings Hywel Dda of Deheubarth and Idwal Foel of Gwynedd.

==== Asia ====
- Emir Mardavij ibn Ziyar defeats and kills his rival Asfar ibn Shiruya. He conquers in rapid succession the Abbasid cities of Hamadan, Dinavar, and Kashan, and finally the entire region of Isfahan, which becomes his capital. Mardavij appoints his brother Vushmgir as the governor of Amol (modern Iran).

=== By topic ===
==== Literature ====
- Nómina Leonesa, an account of the kings of Asturias and León, is published (approximate date).

==== Religion ====
- March – Pope Stephen VII dies after a three-year reign. He is succeeded by John XI (at the age of 20) as the 125th pope of the Catholic Church. His mother Marozia is the powerful senatrix and patricia of Rome.

== Births ==
- March 28 – Liu Chengyou, emperor of Later Han (d. 951)
- September 19 – Mu Zong, emperor of the Liao dynasty (d. 969)
- Adelaide, empress regent of the Holy Roman Empire (d. 999)
- Boris II, ruler (tsar) of the Bulgarian Empire (d. 977)
- Cao Bin, general of the Song dynasty (d. 999)
- Fu (the Elder), empress consort of Later Zhou (d. 956)
- Li Congyi (Prince of Xu), prince of Later Tang (d. 947)
- Liutgard of Saxony, duchess consort of Lorraine (d. 953)
- Taksony, Grand Prince of Hungary (approximate date)
- Yang Guangmei, Chinese general (approximate date)

== Deaths ==
- January 27 – Ruotger, archbishop of Trier
- April 4 – Kong Xun, Chinese governor (b. 884)
- May 29 – Jimeno Garcés, king of Pamplona
- June 25 – An Chonghui, general of Later Tang

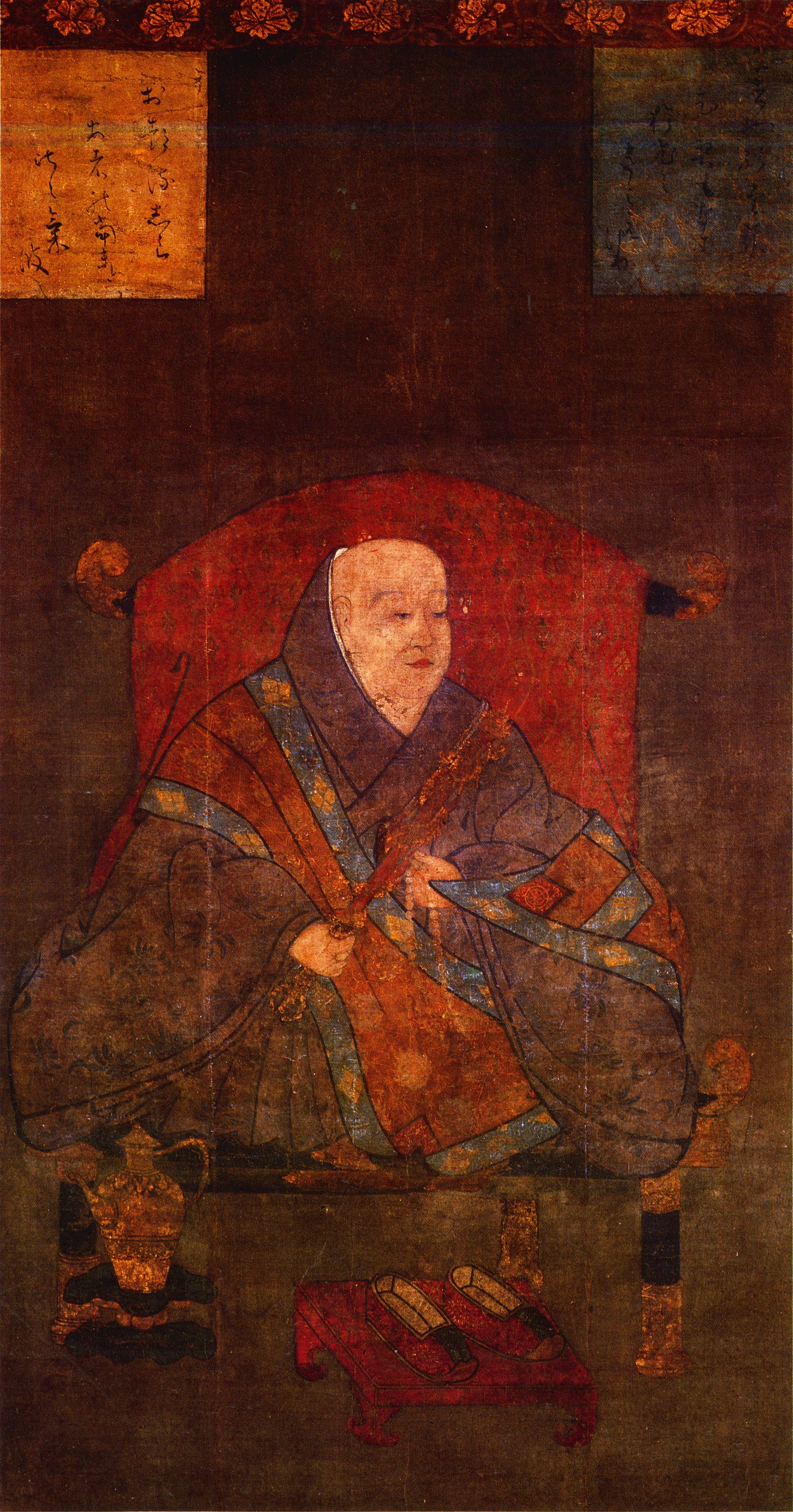
Emperor Uda

- Abu'l-Fadl al-Isfahani, Persian religious leader
- Asfar ibn Shiruya, Iranian military leader
- Bard Boinne, Irish poet and Chief Ollam
- Béatrice of Vermandois, Frankish queen
- Gausbert, count of Empúries and Roussillon
- Gu Quanwu, general of the Tang dynasty (b. 864)
- Harald I, king of Norway (approximate date)
- Hrotheweard (or Lodeward), archbishop of York
- Ibn Masarra, Muslim ascetic and scholar (b. 883)
- Christopher Lekapenos, Byzantine co-emperor
- Robert II, bishop of Tours (approximate date)
- Rollo, Viking leader and count (approximate date)
- Stephen VII, pope of the Catholic Church
- Wang Yanbing, prince of Min (Ten Kingdoms)
