= Miscellaneous Morsels from Youyang =

9th-century book by Duan Chengshi

- Cover of a printed edition of Miscellaneous Morsels from Youyang from Sibu Congkan (volume two)
- Author: Duan Chengshi
- Language: Chinese
- Published: 9th century

Miscellaneous Morsels from Youyang
- Traditional Chinese: 酉陽雜俎
- Simplified Chinese: 酉阳杂俎
- Literal meaning: Youyang miscellaneous chopping-board
Transcriptions
Standard Mandarin
- Hanyu Pinyin: Yǒuyáng zázǔ

The Miscellaneous Morsels from Youyang (Chinese: 酉陽雜俎) is a book written by Duan Chengshi in the 9th century, during the Tang Dynasty. It focuses on miscellany of Chinese and foreign legends and hearsay, reports on natural phenomena, short anecdotes, and tales of the wondrous and mundane, as well as notes on such topics as medicinal herbs and tattoos.

Youyang refers to the south slope of Mount You, a small hill located in what is now Huaihua, Hunan. The book is divided into 30 volumes, containing unusually varied content in over thirteen hundred entries that describe the world that Duan Chengshi heard about, read of, or personally observed. Several tales from the volume are quoted in the Taiping Guangji.

The Ye Xian, a story similar to the fairy tale Cinderella, appears in Chapter 21. The story was allegedly told by Duan's servant Li Shiyuan, a native of what is now Nanning. It is set during the late 3rd century BC. The exact location is unknown, but the most likely candidate is Guangxi, where the shoe eventually found its way to a king from an island.
