= 862 =

Calendar year

862 in various calendars
Gregorian calendar	862; DCCCLXII
Ab urbe condita	1615
Armenian calendar	311; ԹՎ ՅԺԱ
Assyrian calendar	5612
Balinese saka calendar	783–784
Bengali calendar	268–269
Berber calendar	1812
Buddhist calendar	1406
Burmese calendar	224
Byzantine calendar	6370–6371
Chinese calendar	辛巳年 (Metal Snake); 3559 or 3352 — to — 壬午年 (Water Horse); 3560 or 3353
Coptic calendar	578–579
Discordian calendar	2028
Ethiopian calendar	854–855
Hebrew calendar	4622–4623
- Hindu calendars
Vikram Samvat	918–919
Shaka Samvat	783–784
Kali Yuga	3962–3963
Holocene calendar	10862
Iranian calendar	240–241
Islamic calendar	247–248
Japanese calendar	Jōgan 4 (貞観４年)
Javanese calendar	759–760
Julian calendar	862; DCCCLXII
Korean calendar	3195
Minguo calendar	1050 before ROC 民前1050年
Nanakshahi calendar	−606
Seleucid era	1173/1174 AG
Thai solar calendar	1404–1405
Tibetan calendar	ལྕགས་མོ་སྦྲུལ་ལོ་ (female Iron-Snake); 988 or 607 or −165 — to — ཆུ་ཕོ་རྟ་ལོ་ (male Water-Horse); 989 or 608 or −164

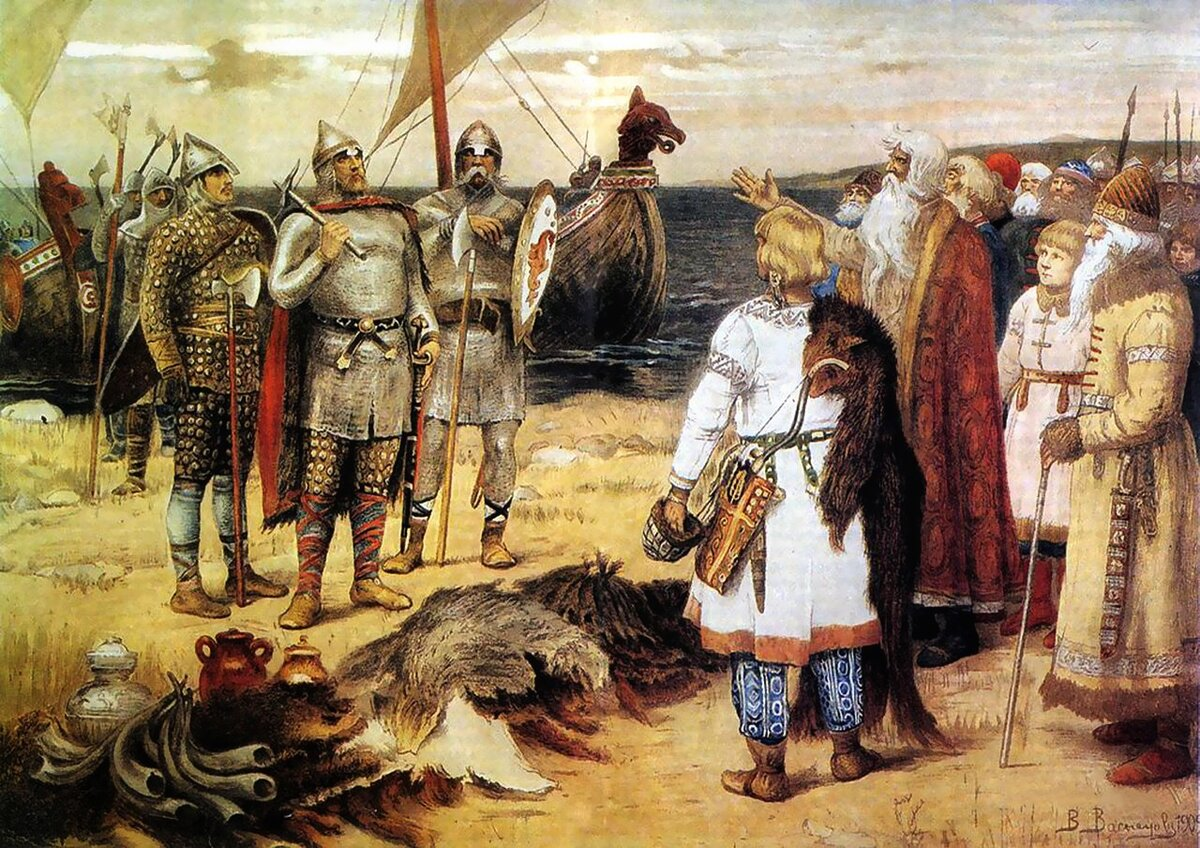
Rurik and his brothers Sineus and Truvor arrive at Staraya Ladoga (modern Russia)

Year 862 (DCCCLXII) was a common year starting on Thursday of the Julian calendar.

== Events ==
=== By place ===
==== Central Europe ====
- King Lothair II of Lotharingia tries to divorce his wife Teutberga, on trumped-up charges of incest. With the support of his brother, Louis II, the bishops give him permission to remarry during a synod at Aachen.
- March – Viking raiders led by Weland are trapped at Trilbardou Bridge (Northern France), and submit to King Charles the Bald. He and his family accept Christianity (they are baptised) before leaving Neustria.
- Robert the Strong, margrave of Neustria, captures 12 Viking ships and kills their crews. He pays tribute (Danegeld) for keeping the Vikings out of Neustria.
- Carloman, eldest son of King Louis the German, revolts against his father. He is captured, but manages to escape to the Ostmark (or 861).
- First raid of the Hungarians in the Carpathian Basin at the request of Rastislav of Moravia against the East Frankish Kingdom.
- Viking forces sack Cologne.

==== Britain ====
- April 13 – King Donald I of Scotland dies after a 4-year reign. He is succeeded by his nephew Constantine I, as ruler of Scotland.
- Áed Findliath is crowned High King of Ireland, after the death of Máel Sechnaill mac Maíl Ruanaid (until 879).

==== Eastern Europe ====
- The Varangians (called Rus'), under the leadership of Rurik, a Viking chieftain, arrive (with his brothers, Sineus and Truvor) at Staraya Ladoga. He builds a trade settlement near Novgorod (modern Russia), and founds the Rurik Dynasty.
- The first written record (according to the Primary Chronicle) is made of the towns of Belozersk and Murom (Northern Russia).

==== Abbasid Caliphate ====
- June – Caliph al-Muntasir dies after just a half-year reign. He is succeeded by al-Musta'in (son of prince Muhammad), as ruler of the Abbasid Caliphate.
- Ashot I ("the Great") is recognized as the 'Prince of Princes' of Armenia, by the Abbasids.

==== China ====
- Fan Chuo finishes his Manchu ("Book of the Southern Tribes"), during the Tang Dynasty.

=== By topic ===
==== Religion ====
- Constantine the Philosopher (alias Saint Cyril) invents the 42-letter Slavonic alphabet (Cyrillic script) as a tool for converting the Moravians to Christianity (approximate date).
- During the Council of Shirakavan representatives of the Armenian, Byzantine and West-Syrian Churches convenes to discuss church union. Though this is not achieved, an agreement is formulated which allows for the peaceful co-existence of Orthodox and non-Chalcedonians in the Byzantine-Armenian borderlands.

== Births ==
- June 8 – Xi Zong, emperor of the Tang Dynasty (d. 888)
- Li Cunxin, general of the Tang Dynasty (d. 902)
- Li Cunshen, general of Later Tang (d. 924)
- Wang Chuzhi, Chinese warlord (d. 922)
- Wang Shenzhi, founder of Min (Ten Kingdoms) (d. 925)
- Xiao Qing, chancellor of Later Liang (d. 930)
- Xu Wen, general and regent of Wu (d. 927)
- Yúnmén Wényǎn, Chinese Zen master (or 864)
- Zhou Ben, general of Wu (d. 938)

== Deaths ==
- April 13 – Donald I, king of Scotland (b. 812)
- July 2 – Swithun, bishop of Winchester
- September 26 – Musa ibn Musa al-Qasawi, Muslim military leader (b. c. 790)
- Æthelred II, king of Northumbria
- Al-Muntasir, Muslim caliph (b. 837)
- Bugha al-Kabir, Muslim general
- Lupus Servatus, Frankish abbot (approximate date)
- Máel Sechnaill mac Maíl Ruanaid, High King of Ireland
- Ruarc mac Brain, king of Leinster (Ireland)
- Tahir ibn Abdallah, Muslim governor
