= 923 =

Calendar year

923 in various calendars
- Gregorian calendar: 923; CMXXIII
- Ab urbe condita: 1676
- Armenian calendar: 372; ԹՎ ՅՀԲ
- Assyrian calendar: 5673
- Balinese saka calendar: 844–845
- Bengali calendar: 329–330
- Berber calendar: 1873
- Buddhist calendar: 1467
- Burmese calendar: 285
- Byzantine calendar: 6431–6432
- Chinese calendar: 壬午年 (Water Horse); 3620 or 3413 — to — 癸未年 (Water Goat); 3621 or 3414
- Coptic calendar: 639–640
- Discordian calendar: 2089
- Ethiopian calendar: 915–916
- Hebrew calendar: 4683–4684
- Hindu calendars
- Vikram Samvat: 979–980
- Shaka Samvat: 844–845
- Kali Yuga: 4023–4024
- Holocene calendar: 10923
- Iranian calendar: 301–302
- Islamic calendar: 310–311
- Japanese calendar: Engi 23 / Enchō 1 (延長元年)
- Javanese calendar: 822–823
- Julian calendar: 923; CMXXIII
- Korean calendar: 3256
- Minguo calendar: 989 before ROC 民前989年
- Nanakshahi calendar: −545
- Seleucid era: 1234/1235 AG
- Thai solar calendar: 1465–1466
- Tibetan calendar: ཆུ་ཕོ་རྟ་ལོ་ (male Water-Horse); 1049 or 668 or −104 — to — ཆུ་མོ་ལུག་ལོ་ (female Water-Sheep); 1050 or 669 or −103

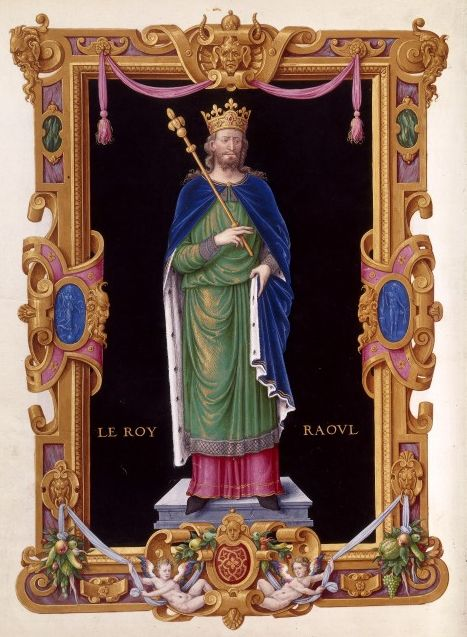
Rudolph, elected King of West Francia (France) in 923

Year 923 (CMXXIII) was a common year starting on Wednesday of the Julian calendar.

== Events ==
=== By place ===
==== Europe ====
- June 15 – Battle of Soissons: King Robert I is killed; the Frankish army, led by Charles the Simple, is defeated and routed near Soissons. Charles is captured and imprisoned at Péronne. The nobles elect Robert's son-in-law Rudolph, duke of Burgundy, as king of the West Frankish Kingdom (until 936).
- July 29 – Battle of Fiorenzuola: Lombard forces led by King Rudolph II and Adalbert I, margrave of Ivrea, defeat the deposed Emperor Berengar I at Firenzuola (Tuscany). A pact is reached between Rudolph and Berengar, who abdicates the imperial throne and cedes sovereignty over the rest of Italy.

==== Asia ====
- May 13 – The Later Liang, one of the Five Dynasties in China, falls to Later Tang (founded by Li Cunxu). Li proclaims himself emperor and moves his residence back to the old Tang capital of Luoyang.
- August 11 – Sack of Basra: The Qarmatians of Bahrayn capture and pillage the city of Basra.

== Births ==
- September 7 – Suzaku, emperor of Japan (d. 952)
- Abu Hayyan al-Tawhidi, Muslim intellectual (d. 1023)
- Al-Shaykh al-Saduq, Muslim scholar (approximate date)
- Eadred (or Edred), king of England (d. 955) (approximate date)
- Fujiwara no Nakafumi, Japanese waka poet (d. 992)
- Jeongjong, king of Goryeo (Korea) (d. 949)
- Liu Honggao, Chinese chancellor (d. 943)

== Deaths ==
- June 15 – Robert I, king of the West Frankish Kingdom (b. 860)
- August 2 – Plegmund, archbishop of Canterbury (or 914)
- August 27 – Ageltrude, queen of Italy and Holy Roman Empress
- October 8 – Pilgrim I, archbishop of Salzburg
- November 15 – Wang Yanzhang, Chinese general of Later Liang (b. 863), executed
- November 18 – Zhu Youzhen, Chinese emperor of Later Liang (b. 888), assisted suicide
- November 20
  - Jing Xiang, Chinese strategist, suicide
  - Li Zhen, Chinese official of Later Liang, executed
- Abu Bakr al-Khallal, Muslim scholar and jurist (b. 848)
- Adarnase IV, prince of Iberia/Kartli (Georgia)
- Badr al-Hammami (the Elder), Abbasid general
- Gurgen I, prince of Tao-Klarjeti (Georgia)
- Harshavarman I, king of Angkor (Cambodia)
- Ma Chuo, Chinese general and official of Wuyue (or 922)
- Muhammad ibn Jarir al-Tabari, Persian scholar (b. 839)
- Reccared, Galician clergyman (b. 885)
- Ricwin, Count of Verdun (or Ricuin), Frankish nobleman
- Walter (or Vaulter), archbishop of Sens
- Zhao Yan, Chinese military prefect and official of Later Liang, killed
