= 790 =

Calendar year

790 in various calendars
- Gregorian calendar: 790; DCCXC
- Ab urbe condita: 1543
- Armenian calendar: 239; ԹՎ ՄԼԹ
- Assyrian calendar: 5540
- Balinese saka calendar: 711–712
- Bengali calendar: 196–197
- Berber calendar: 1740
- Buddhist calendar: 1334
- Burmese calendar: 152
- Byzantine calendar: 6298–6299
- Chinese calendar: 己巳年 (Earth Snake); 3487 or 3280 — to — 庚午年 (Metal Horse); 3488 or 3281
- Coptic calendar: 506–507
- Discordian calendar: 1956
- Ethiopian calendar: 782–783
- Hebrew calendar: 4550–4551
- Hindu calendars
- Vikram Samvat: 846–847
- Shaka Samvat: 711–712
- Kali Yuga: 3890–3891
- Holocene calendar: 10790
- Iranian calendar: 168–169
- Islamic calendar: 173–174
- Japanese calendar: Enryaku 9 (延暦９年)
- Javanese calendar: 685–686
- Julian calendar: 790; DCCXC
- Korean calendar: 3123
- Minguo calendar: 1122 before ROC 民前1122年
- Nanakshahi calendar: −678
- Seleucid era: 1101/1102 AG
- Thai solar calendar: 1332–1333
- Tibetan calendar: ས་མོ་སྦྲུལ་ལོ་ (female Earth-Snake); 916 or 535 or −237 — to — ལྕགས་ཕོ་རྟ་ལོ་ (male Iron-Horse); 917 or 536 or −236

Srivijaya Kingdom around the 8th century

Year 790 (DCCXC) was a common year starting on Friday of the Julian calendar, the 790th year of the Common Era (CE) and Anno Domini (AD) designations, the 790th year of the 1st millennium, the 90th year of the 8th century, and the 1st year of the 790s decade. The denomination 790 for this year has been used since the early medieval period, when the Anno Domini calendar era became the prevalent method in Europe for naming years.

== Events ==
=== By place ===
==== Byzantine Empire ====
- September – The Armeniac Theme, located in northeastern Asia Minor (modern Turkey), revolts against Empress Irene, and declares the 19-year-old Constantine VI sole ruler of the Byzantine Empire. Other themes follow its example, and imprison their strategoi. Constantine sends his iconoclast general Michael Lachanodrakon, to ensure that the Armeniacs (his closest supporters) take an oath. Irene is confined and imprisoned in her palace at Constantinople; all her eunuchs are exiled.

==== Europe ====
- Alcuin, Anglo-Saxon missionary, returns (after an 8-year absence) to England. During his stay at the Carolingian court of King Charlemagne in Aachen, he has educated his sons Charles, Pepin and Louis. Alcuin revises the church liturgy and the Bible, and is responsible for an intellectual movement within the Frankish Kingdom.

==== Britain ====
- King Æthelred I returns to Northumbria, and is restored to the throne after living in exile for 11 years. His rival Osred II is deposed, forcibly tonsured, and exiled to the Isle of Man. Æthelred then faces a rebellion by another rival, named Eardwulf. The latter is captured, and hanged outside the gates to Ripon Abbey. The body is taken into the abbey, where Eardwulf recovers and escapes to exile.
- King Offa of Mercia takes control of East Anglia. King Æthelberht II mints his own coins, in defiance of his overlord (approximate date).

==== Asia ====
- Cambodia begins to break away from the Sumatra-based kingdom Srivijaya, as a 20-year-old Cambodian prince, who claims descent from the rulers of Funan, is consecrated in eastern Cambodia with the title Jayavarman II. In the next 10 years he will extend his powers north into the Mekong Valley (modern Vietnam).

=== By topic ===
==== Religion ====
- Irish monks (known as the Papar), possibly members of a Hiberno-Scottish mission, supposedly reach Iceland in hide-covered coracles, and begin settlements (approximate date). However, the evidence for this is scant.
- Angilbert, Frankish diplomat (primicerius palatii) of King Charlemagne, is made abbot of Saint-Riquier (Northern France).
- Joseph is consecrated Syriac Orthodox Patriarch of Antioch

== Births ==
- Athanasia of Aegina, Byzantine noblewoman, adviser and saint (approximate date)
- Cyngen ap Cadell, king of Powys (Wales)
- Fātimah bint Mūsā, Muslim saint (d. 816)
- Íñigo Arista, king of Pamplona (approximate date)
- Leo IV, pope of the Catholic Church (d. 855)
- Li He, Chinese poet (d. 816)
- Lu Tong, Chinese poet (d. 835)
- Musa ibn Musa al-Qasawi, Muslim military leader (d. 862)
- Ramiro I, king of Asturias (approximate date)

== Deaths ==
- Fujiwara no Otomuro, Japanese empress consort (b. 760)
- Thecla of Kitzingen, saint and abbess
- Torson, Frankish count of Toulouse (or 789)
