= 938 =

Calendar year

938 in various calendars
- Gregorian calendar: 938; CMXXXVIII
- Ab urbe condita: 1691
- Armenian calendar: 387; ԹՎ ՅՁԷ
- Assyrian calendar: 5688
- Balinese saka calendar: 859–860
- Bengali calendar: 344–345
- Berber calendar: 1888
- Buddhist calendar: 1482
- Burmese calendar: 300
- Byzantine calendar: 6446–6447
- Chinese calendar: 丁酉年 (Fire Rooster); 3635 or 3428 — to — 戊戌年 (Earth Dog); 3636 or 3429
- Coptic calendar: 654–655
- Discordian calendar: 2104
- Ethiopian calendar: 930–931
- Hebrew calendar: 4698–4699
- Hindu calendars
- Vikram Samvat: 994–995
- Shaka Samvat: 859–860
- Kali Yuga: 4038–4039
- Holocene calendar: 10938
- Iranian calendar: 316–317
- Islamic calendar: 326–327
- Japanese calendar: Jōhei 8 / Tengyō 1 (天慶元年)
- Javanese calendar: 838–839
- Julian calendar: 938; CMXXXVIII
- Korean calendar: 3271
- Minguo calendar: 974 before ROC 民前974年
- Nanakshahi calendar: −530
- Seleucid era: 1249/1250 AG
- Thai solar calendar: 1480–1481
- Tibetan calendar: མེ་མོ་བྱ་ལོ་ (female Fire-Bird); 1064 or 683 or −89 — to — ས་ཕོ་ཁྱི་ལོ་ (male Earth-Dog); 1065 or 684 or −88

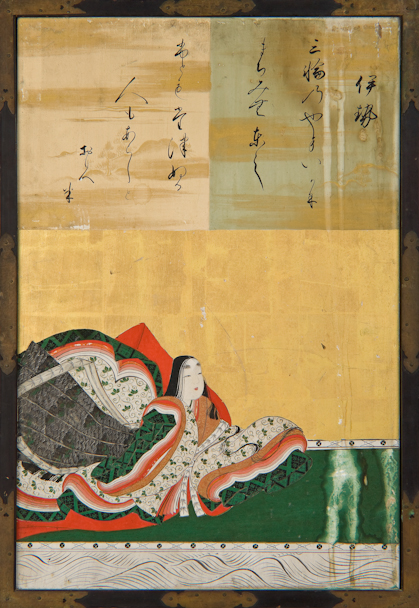
Portrait of Lady Ise by Kanō Tan'yū (1648).

Year 938 (CMXXXVIII) was a common year starting on Monday of the Julian calendar.

== Events ==
=== By place ===
==== Europe ====
- Summer – The Hungarian army invades Northern Italy with the permission of King Hugh of Arles. They cross the Apennines, and sack the Lombard lands in Tuscany, Lazio and Campania. Finally, the Hungarians are defeated at Wolfenbüttel by a Saxon army.
- July – King Otto I besieges the fortress of Eresburg. He defeats his half-brother Thankmar and kills him as he tries to find sanctuary. Eberhard III, duke of Franconia, is banished and replaced by his uncle Berthold.
- Fall – Otto I defeats in two campaigns a series of uprisings in Saxony, Franconia and Lotharingia. He signs a "friendship pact" with King Louis IV ("d'Outremer") of the West Frankish Kingdom.

==== Asia ====
- Battle of Bach Dang: Tĩnh Hải Quân forces under the rule of Ngô Quyền defeated an invading force of the Southern Han state at the Bach Dang River. This put an end to Chinese imperial domination in Vietnam after nearly 1,000 years.
- The Sixteen Prefectures, which includes the area around modern-day Beijing, are absorbed in the Khitan Empire.

== Births ==
- September 14 – Sahib ibn Abbad, Buyid grand vizier (d. 995)
- Almanzor, Umayyad vizier and de facto ruler (approximate date)
- Beatrice of France, duchess regent of Upper Lorraine (approximate date)
- García Fernández, count of Castile and Álava (approximate date)
- Olaf the Peacock, Icelandic merchant and chieftain (approximate date)
- Romanos II, Byzantine emperor (d. 963)
- Sancho II, king of Navarre (approximate date)

== Deaths ==
- February 3 – Zhou Ben, general of Wu (b. 862)
- July 28 – Thankmar, half-brother of Otto I (during the Siege of Eresburg)
- Lady Ise, Japanese noblewoman and poet (b. 875) (approximate date)
- Lady Peng, noblewoman of Chu (Ten Kingdoms)
- Muhammad ibn Ja'far al-Khara'iti, Abbasid theologian
- Shen Song, chancellor of Wuyue (b. 863)
