= 863 Dvin earthquake =

The 863 Dvin earthquake reportedly took place in the city of Dvin on 13 February, 863.

During the 9th century, Dvin was the only "heavily populated" city in Muslim-dominated Armenia. The city was part of the wider Abbasid Caliphate, and had a multiethnic population.

The historian Hovhannes Draskhanakerttsi (10th century) reports that the earthquake affected the royal residence at Dvin. He dates the earthquake as following the death of Ashot Bagratuni, the prince of princes. According to Hovhannes' narrative the earthquake caused great amage to the city's houses, the defensive walls, and the palaces. The tremors caused desolation within the city. Many people perished in the initial earthquake. The survivors fled to the city's marketplaces and to the streets, fearing that their residences would collapse. Winter weather with "stinging" frost troubled the survivors, and many of them suffered from frostbite.

The historian Stepanos Asoghik (10th to 11th century) dates the earthquake to the reign of Ashot Bagratuni. He places the earthquake in the period of Lent, on the day of Little Saturday. According to his narrative, the earthquake killed many people and destroyed "luxurious" houses. He reports that tremors lasted for three months.

The historian Movses Kaghankatvatsi (10th to 11th century) instead claimed that the tremors lasted for a whole year. He reports that 120,000 people were swallowed up by the abyss. He dates the event to the year 318 of the Armenian calendar, corresponding to the years 869 and 870 of Anno Domini.

The date of 13 February derives from the Palestine-Georgian calendar, a 10th-century liturgical text. It reported that the earthquake took place during the feast day of Demetrius of Thessaloniki and Martinianus Monachus. In the Byzantine liturgical calendar, the feast day of Demetrius of Thessaloniki is on 26 October, not 13 February. There are two earthquakes in Constantinople which were dated on the feast day of Demetrius of Thessaloniki, one dated to 26 October, 740 and the other to 26 October, 989. Both earthquakes were commemorated in the Byzantine liturgy.

The historian Tovma Artsruni (11th century) compared this earthquake to the 893 Dvin earthquake, reporting that it was less severe than its 893 counterpart. He dates the earlier earthquake to the term of Zacharias I of Armenia as Catholicos of All Armenians. He also dates the earthquake to the seventh year of the Armenian captivity. This would correspond to years 859 and 860 of Anno Domini.

The historian Samuel Aneci (12th century) dates the earthquake to year 312 of the Armenian calendar.

In primary sources, the earthquake is variously dated to between 861 and 869. The uncertainty of the chronology may have been based on the different chronological systems in use within Arab-dominated Armenia. The Medieval historians had difficulty in establishing an exact date for this earthquake.

== Sources ==
- Guidoboni, Emanuela; Traina, Giusto (1995), A new catalogue of earthquakes in the historical Armenian area from antiquity to the 12th century, Annals of Geophysics
