= 922 =

Calendar year

922 in various calendars
- Gregorian calendar: 922; CMXXII
- Ab urbe condita: 1675
- Armenian calendar: 371; ԹՎ ՅՀԱ
- Assyrian calendar: 5672
- Balinese saka calendar: 843–844
- Bengali calendar: 328–329
- Berber calendar: 1872
- Buddhist calendar: 1466
- Burmese calendar: 284
- Byzantine calendar: 6430–6431
- Chinese calendar: 辛巳年 (Metal Snake); 3619 or 3412 — to — 壬午年 (Water Horse); 3620 or 3413
- Coptic calendar: 638–639
- Discordian calendar: 2088
- Ethiopian calendar: 914–915
- Hebrew calendar: 4682–4683
- Hindu calendars
- Vikram Samvat: 978–979
- Shaka Samvat: 843–844
- Kali Yuga: 4022–4023
- Holocene calendar: 10922
- Iranian calendar: 300–301
- Islamic calendar: 309–310
- Japanese calendar: Engi 22 (延喜２２年)
- Javanese calendar: 821–822
- Julian calendar: 922; CMXXII
- Korean calendar: 3255
- Minguo calendar: 990 before ROC 民前990年
- Nanakshahi calendar: −546
- Seleucid era: 1233/1234 AG
- Thai solar calendar: 1464–1465
- Tibetan calendar: ལྕགས་མོ་སྦྲུལ་ལོ་ (female Iron-Snake); 1048 or 667 or −105 — to — ཆུ་ཕོ་རྟ་ལོ་ (male Water-Horse); 1049 or 668 or −104

Year 922 (CMXXII) was a common year starting on Tuesday of the Julian calendar.

== Events ==
=== By place ===
==== Byzantine Empire ====
- Summer – Battle of Constantinople: Emperor Romanos I sends Byzantine troops to repel another Bulgarian raid at the outskirts of Constantinople. The Byzantines storm the Bulgarian camp, but are defeated when they are confronted by the main Bulgarian forces. Having won the battle, the Bulgarians lack the maritime power to conduct a successful siege of Constantinople.

==== Europe ====
- Summer – The West Frankish nobles revolt and depose King Charles III (the Simple) after a 24-year reign. He seeks refuge in Lotharingia and is replaced by Robert I, a brother of the late King Odo, who is crowned king of the West Frankish Kingdom in the cathedral at Rheims.
- Adalbert I, margrave of Ivrea, leads a rebellion with the support of the Italian nobles against King Berengar I. He crosses the Alps into Burgundy and invites Rudolph II of Upper Burgundy to invade Italy. Berengar flees again to Verona and Rudolph is crowned King of Italy at Pavia.

=== By topic ===
==== Religion ====
- March 26 – Mansur al-Hallaj, a Persian mystic writer, is sentenced to death for heresy after a long trial at Baghdad. Having supported reform in the Abbasid Caliphate, he has been seen as a rabble-rouser, and is flogged, mutilated and executed (by beheading).

== Births ==
- Hedwig of Nordgau, countess of Luxemburg (approximate date)
- Ibn Abi Zayd, Muslim imam and scholar (d. 996)
- Ki no Tokibumi, Japanese nobleman and waka poet (d. 996)
- Sigfried, founder of Luxemburg (approximate date)
- Wang Pu, Chinese chancellor and writer (d. 982)

== Deaths ==
- February 20 – Theodora, Byzantine empress
- March 26 – Mansur al-Hallaj, Persian mystic writer
- May 23 – Li Sizhao, Chinese general and governor
- Æthelweard, son of Alfred the Great of England (or 920)
- Al-Nayrizi, Persian mathematician and astronomer (b. 865)
- Fortún Garcés ("the Monk"), king of Pamplona
- Galindo II Aznárez, count of Aragon (Spain)
- Li Cunjin, general of the Tang dynasty (b. 857)
- Li Cunzhang, general of the Tang dynasty
- Lucídio Vimaranes, count of Portugal
- Ma Chuo, general and official of Wuyue (or 923)
- Wang Chuzhi, Chinese warlord (b. 862)
- Zhang Chengye, Chinese eunuch official (b. 846)
- Zhang Chujin, Chinese governor (jiedushi)
