= Durra'ah =

Ceremonial robe

The durrāʿah was a ceremonial robe worn by the Abbasid court from the time of caliph al-Mansur (r. 754–775) until it was replaced by the shorter qabāʾ in the mid-9th century. It was black, the official colour of the Abbasid dynasty, and was closed in the front by buttons. Its use as court dress for civilian and military officials—but not religious, who wore the ṭaylasān instead—gave it great prestige.

== Sources ==
- Bosworth, C. E., ed. (1991). The History of al-Ṭabarī, Volume XXXIII: Storm and Stress along the Northern Frontiers of the ʿAbbāsid Caliphate. The Caliphate of al-Mu'tasim, A.D. 833–842/A.H. 218–227. Albany, New York: State University of New York Press. ISBN 0-7914-0493-5.
