= Little Saturday =

European cultural concept

Little Saturday (Bokmål and Danish: lille lørdag, Finnish: pikkulauantai, Nynorsk: litle laurdag, Swedish: lillördag) is a European concept especially celebrated in Sweden, Norway, Finland, Denmark that adds Wednesday to the list of "drinking days". Many nightclubs and bars stay open late and offer many kinds of little Saturday specials such as music shows and drink specials.

== Variants by country ==
Swedish, Norwegian and Danish teenagers and young adults often use lillördag, lille lørdag as slang for Wednesday (onsdag in Swedish and Norwegian). In the UK and Ireland, "Little Saturday Wednesdays" offer student discounts in some bars, and the Wednesday as Little Saturday is in some places seen as the students night out, although it is not as widespread as in other countries.

In Sweden, Norway and Denmark, the tradition comes from 'the maid's Saturday' Swedish: piglördag, which fell on a Wednesday. That was the day when the maid had her day off, as she normally did not have any time off on Saturdays.

"Little Saturday" referring to Wednesday is also a well known concept amongst South Africans, young and old and is used to justify a mid-week tipple when the week seems too long.
