= 940 =

Calendar year

940 in various calendars
- Gregorian calendar: 940; CMXL
- Ab urbe condita: 1693
- Armenian calendar: 389; ԹՎ ՅՁԹ
- Assyrian calendar: 5690
- Balinese saka calendar: 861–862
- Bengali calendar: 346–347
- Berber calendar: 1890
- Buddhist calendar: 1484
- Burmese calendar: 302
- Byzantine calendar: 6448–6449
- Chinese calendar: 己亥年 (Earth Pig); 3637 or 3430 — to — 庚子年 (Metal Rat); 3638 or 3431
- Coptic calendar: 656–657
- Discordian calendar: 2106
- Ethiopian calendar: 932–933
- Hebrew calendar: 4700–4701
- Hindu calendars
- Vikram Samvat: 996–997
- Shaka Samvat: 861–862
- Kali Yuga: 4040–4041
- Holocene calendar: 10940
- Iranian calendar: 318–319
- Islamic calendar: 328–329
- Japanese calendar: Tengyō 3 (天慶３年)
- Javanese calendar: 840–841
- Julian calendar: 940; CMXL
- Korean calendar: 3273
- Minguo calendar: 972 before ROC 民前972年
- Nanakshahi calendar: −528
- Seleucid era: 1251/1252 AG
- Thai solar calendar: 1482–1483
- Tibetan calendar: ས་མོ་ཕག་ལོ་ (female Earth-Boar); 1066 or 685 or −87 — to — ལྕགས་ཕོ་བྱི་བ་ལོ་ (male Iron-Rat); 1067 or 686 or −86

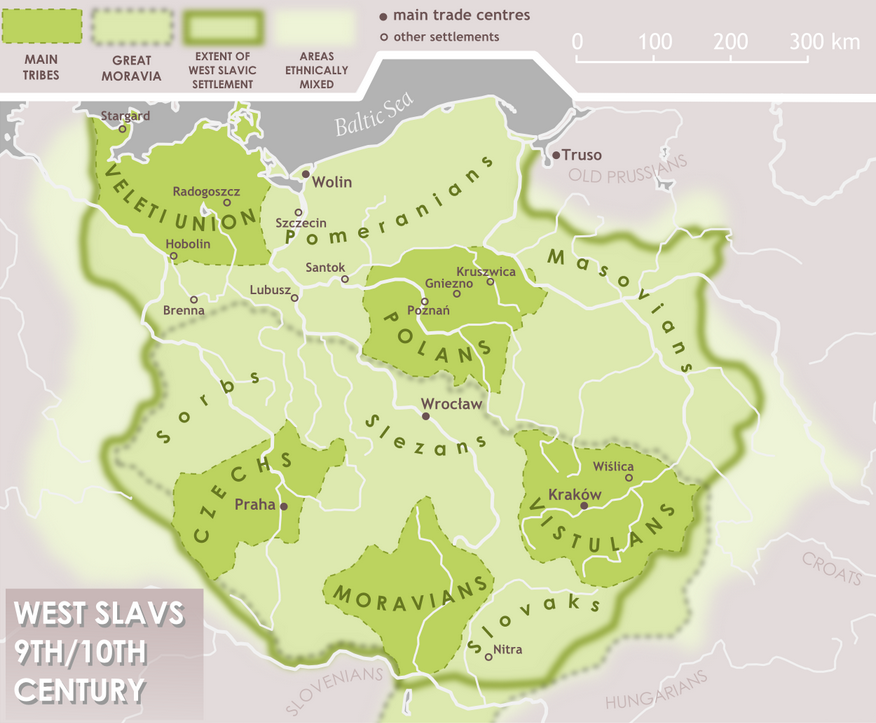
West Slavs during the 9th–10th centuries.

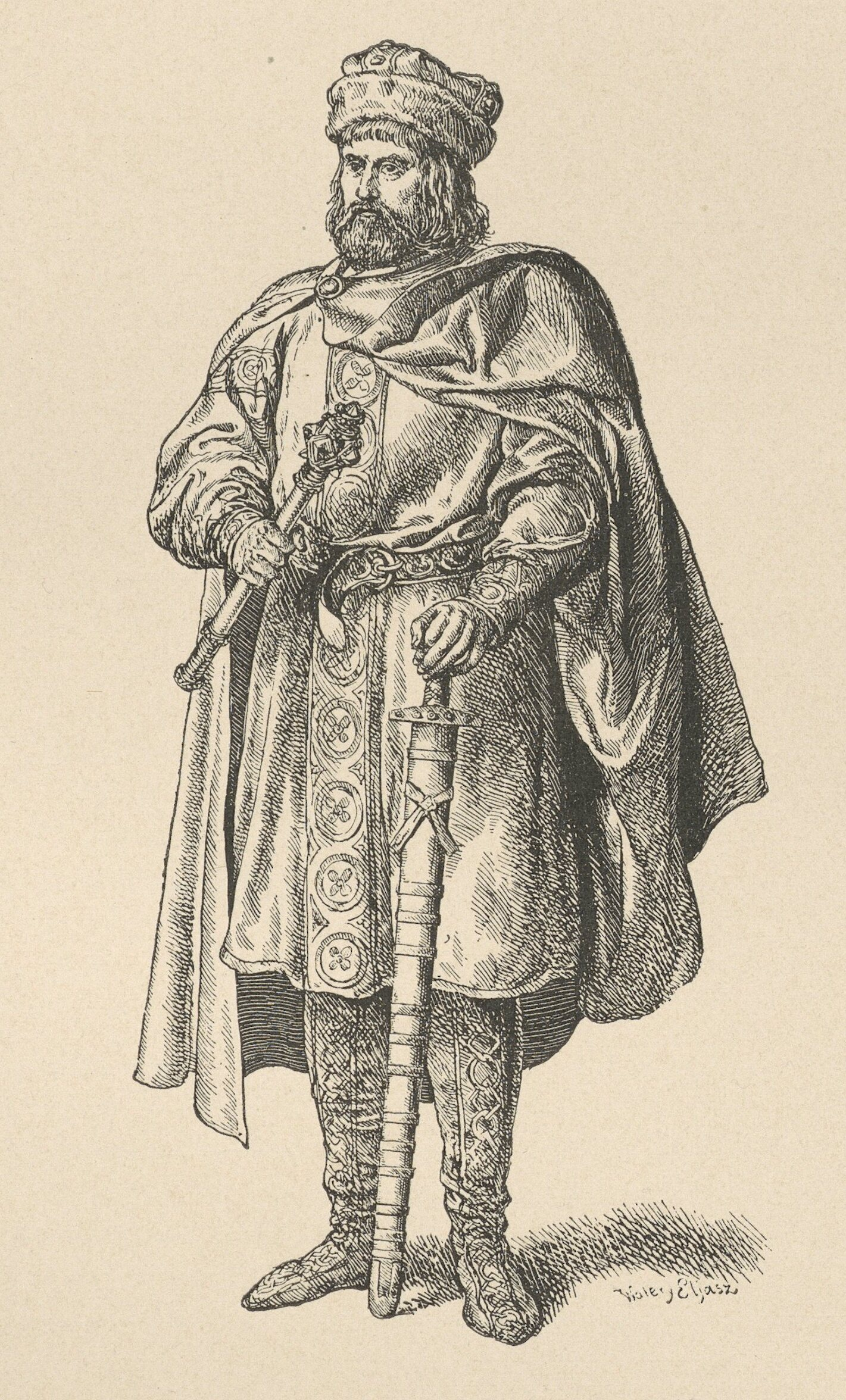
Siemomysł, duke of the Piast Dynasty.

Year 940 (CMXL) was a leap year starting on Wednesday of the Julian calendar.

== Events ==
=== By place ===
==== Europe ====
- The tribe of the Polans begins the construction of the following fortified settlements (Giecz, Bnin, Ląd, Gniezno, Poznań, Grzybowo and Ostrów Lednicki) in Greater Poland. The Piast Dynasty under Duke Siemomysł gains control over other groups of Polans along the Upper Vistula, and establishes their rule around Giecz (approximate date).

==== Japan ====
- March 25 – Taira no Masakado, the self-proclaimed "New Emperor" (新皇), is subdued by local rivals who revolt against his rule. His forces are defeated by his cousin, Taira no Sadamori, in Shimōsa Province. Masakado's head is brought back to Emperor Suzaku in Tokyo.

=== By topic ===
==== Literature ====
- Saadia Gaon, a Jewish rabbi and philosopher, compiles his Siddur (Jewish prayer book) in Arabic and synagogal poetry in modern-day Iraq (approximate date).

==== Religion ====
- Narita-san ("New victory temple"), a Shingon Buddhist temple, is founded in Chiba (Japan).

== Births ==
- June 10 – Abu al-Wafa' Buzjani, Persian mathematician and astronomer (d. 998)
- Abdollah ibn Bukhtishu, Syrian physician and scientist (d. 1058)
- Abu-Mahmud Khojandi, Persian astronomer and mathematician (d. 1000)
- Abū Sahl al-Qūhī, Persian mathematician and physicist (approximate date)
- Adelaide-Blanche of Anjou, French queen and regent (d. 1026)
- Al-Baqillani, Muslim theologian and jurist (approximate date)
- Baldwin III ("the Young"), Frankish nobleman (approximate date)
- Chavundaraya, Indian general, architect and poet (d. 989)
- Damian Dalassenos, Byzantine governor (approximate date)
- Eadwig ("the All-Fair"), king of England (approximate date)
- Ferdowsi, Persian poet and author (approximate date)
- George El Mozahem, Egyptian martyr and saint (d. 969)
- Géza, Grand Prince of the Hungarians (approximate date)
- Guy (or Guido), margrave of Ivrea (Piedmont) (d. 965)
- Henry III ("the Younger"), duke of Bavaria (approximate date)
- Leopold I, margrave of Austria (approximate date)
- Lothair I, margrave of the Nordmark (approximate date)
- Notker of Liège, French bishop and prince-bishop (d. 1008)
- Sulayman al-Ghazzi, Arab poet and bishop of Gaza (approximate date)
- Subh of Córdoba, mother and regent of Hisham II (approximate date)
- Thorgeir Ljosvetningagodi, Icelandic lawspeaker (approximate date)
- Vijayanandi, Indian mathematician and astronomer (approximate date)
- Willigis, German archchancellor and archbishop (approximate date)
- Wulfhilda of Barking, English nun and abbess (approximate date)

== Deaths ==
- March 25 – Taira no Masakado, Japanese nobleman and samurai
- May 12 – Eutychius, patriarch of Alexandria (b. 877)
- June 7 – Qian Hongzun, heir apparent of Wuyue (b. 925)
- July 4 – Wang Jianli, Chinese general (b. 871)
- July 20 – Ibn Muqla, Abbasid vizier and calligrapher
- August 5 – Li Decheng, Chinese general (b. 863)
- September 30 – Fan Yanguang, Chinese general
- November 8 – Yao Yi, Chinese chancellor (b. 866)
- November 14 – Abu'l-Fadl al-Bal'ami, Samanid vizier
- December 23 – Ar-Radi, Abbasid caliph (b. 909)
- December 25 – Makan ibn Kaki, Daylamite warlord
- Atenulf II, prince of Benevento and Capua (Italy)
- Faelan mac Muiredach, king of Leinster (Ireland)
- Ibn Abd Rabbih, Moorish writer and poet (b. 860)
- Rajyapala, emperor of the Pala Dynasty (Bengal)
- Yang Lian, crown prince of Wu (Ten Kingdoms)
- Zhao Guangyi, Chinese official and chancellor
