= Fan Chuo (Tang dynasty) =

Tang Dynasty Civil Servant

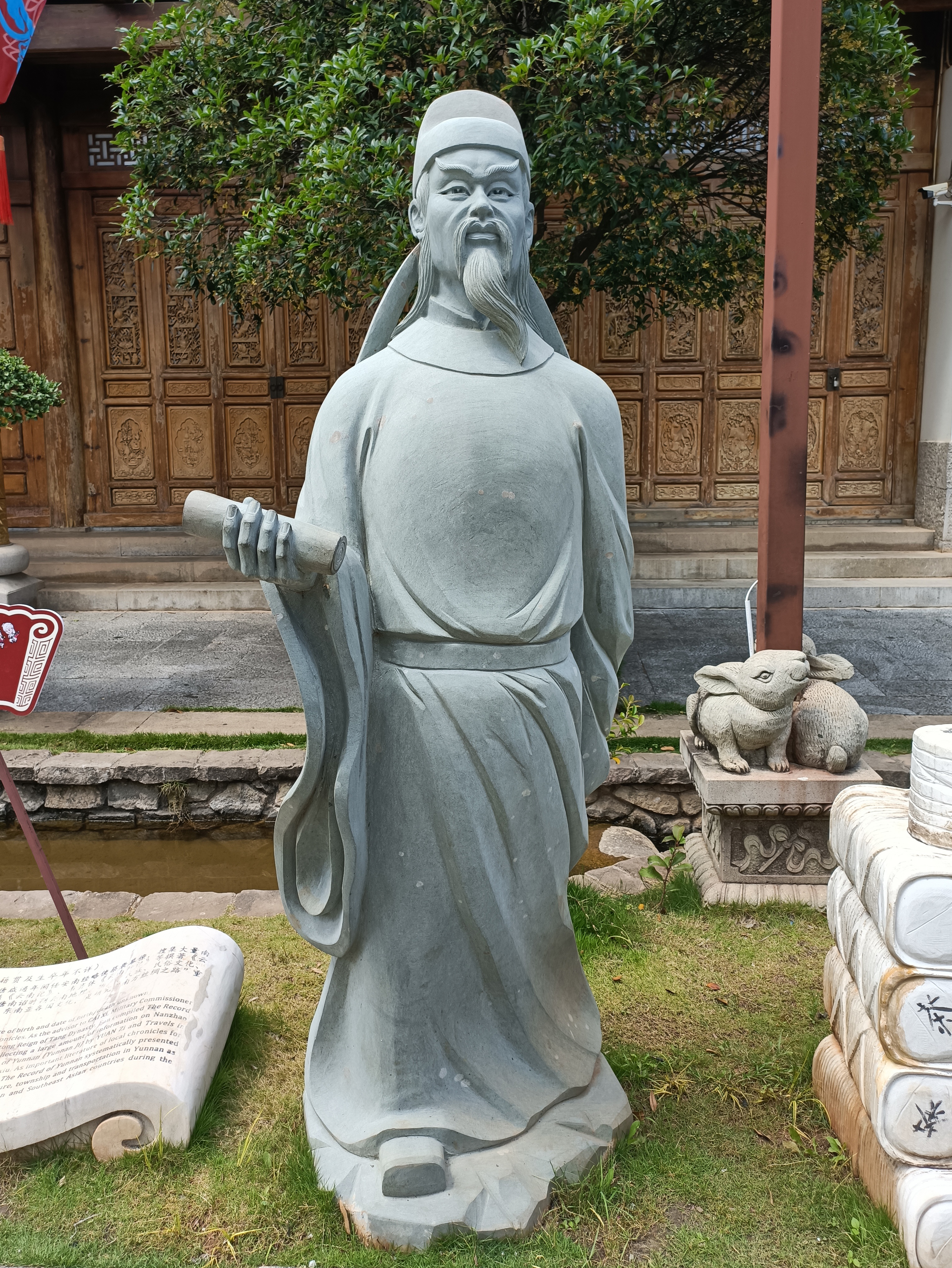
Statue of Fanchuo in Jianchuan, Yunnan

Fan Chuo (simplified Chinese: 樊绰; traditional Chinese: 樊綽; pinyin: fán chuò; previously romanized as Fan Ch'e and Fan Zhuo) (??? – late 9th century) was a secretary working under the Jiedu (simplified Chinese: 节度; traditional Chinese: 節度; pinyin: jié dù) (similar to the Byzantine thema) with headquarters located at Hanoi.

Since the thema was a front of the Tang dynasty against Nanzhao, he was able to get his hands on the updated diplomatic and military documents of the two countries. He also lived in Hanoi during his first tenure; therefore he knew some firsthand information of the city, such as trades, deployments, population, etc. As the Nanzhao army sacked the city for the first time, he just escaped from being captured by jumping into the Red River and swimming to the opposite bank. Then he worked under another Jie-du located at Guangzhou where he compiled the first draft of Manshu (simplified Chinese: 蛮书; traditional Chinese: 蠻書; pinyin: mánshū; lit. 'barbarian document'; roughly means the book on the southern tribes). He also worked a second tenure in Hanoi where he finished the book in 862 CE. He died in Guangzhou after retirement. His book Manshu is an invaluable source of the Tang-Nanzhao relation and for anthropological research of Hmong and Vietnam during the later years of the Tang dynasty. For instance, his eyewitness account on the siege of Hanoi was monumental.

Vietnamese, English, and French translations are also available.

== See also ==
- History of China
- List of past Chinese ethnic groups
