= 925 =

Calendar year

925 in various calendars
- Gregorian calendar: 925; CMXXV
- Ab urbe condita: 1678
- Armenian calendar: 374; ԹՎ ՅՀԴ
- Assyrian calendar: 5675
- Balinese saka calendar: 846–847
- Bengali calendar: 331–332
- Berber calendar: 1875
- Buddhist calendar: 1469
- Burmese calendar: 287
- Byzantine calendar: 6433–6434
- Chinese calendar: 甲申年 (Wood Monkey); 3622 or 3415 — to — 乙酉年 (Wood Rooster); 3623 or 3416
- Coptic calendar: 641–642
- Discordian calendar: 2091
- Ethiopian calendar: 917–918
- Hebrew calendar: 4685–4686
- Hindu calendars
- Vikram Samvat: 981–982
- Shaka Samvat: 846–847
- Kali Yuga: 4025–4026
- Holocene calendar: 10925
- Iranian calendar: 303–304
- Islamic calendar: 312–313
- Japanese calendar: Enchō 3 (延長３年)
- Javanese calendar: 824–825
- Julian calendar: 925; CMXXV
- Korean calendar: 3258
- Minguo calendar: 987 before ROC 民前987年
- Nanakshahi calendar: −543
- Seleucid era: 1236/1237 AG
- Thai solar calendar: 1467–1468
- Tibetan calendar: ཤིང་ཕོ་སྤྲེ་ལོ་ (male Wood-Monkey); 1051 or 670 or −102 — to — ཤིང་མོ་བྱ་ལོ་ (female Wood-Bird); 1052 or 671 or −101

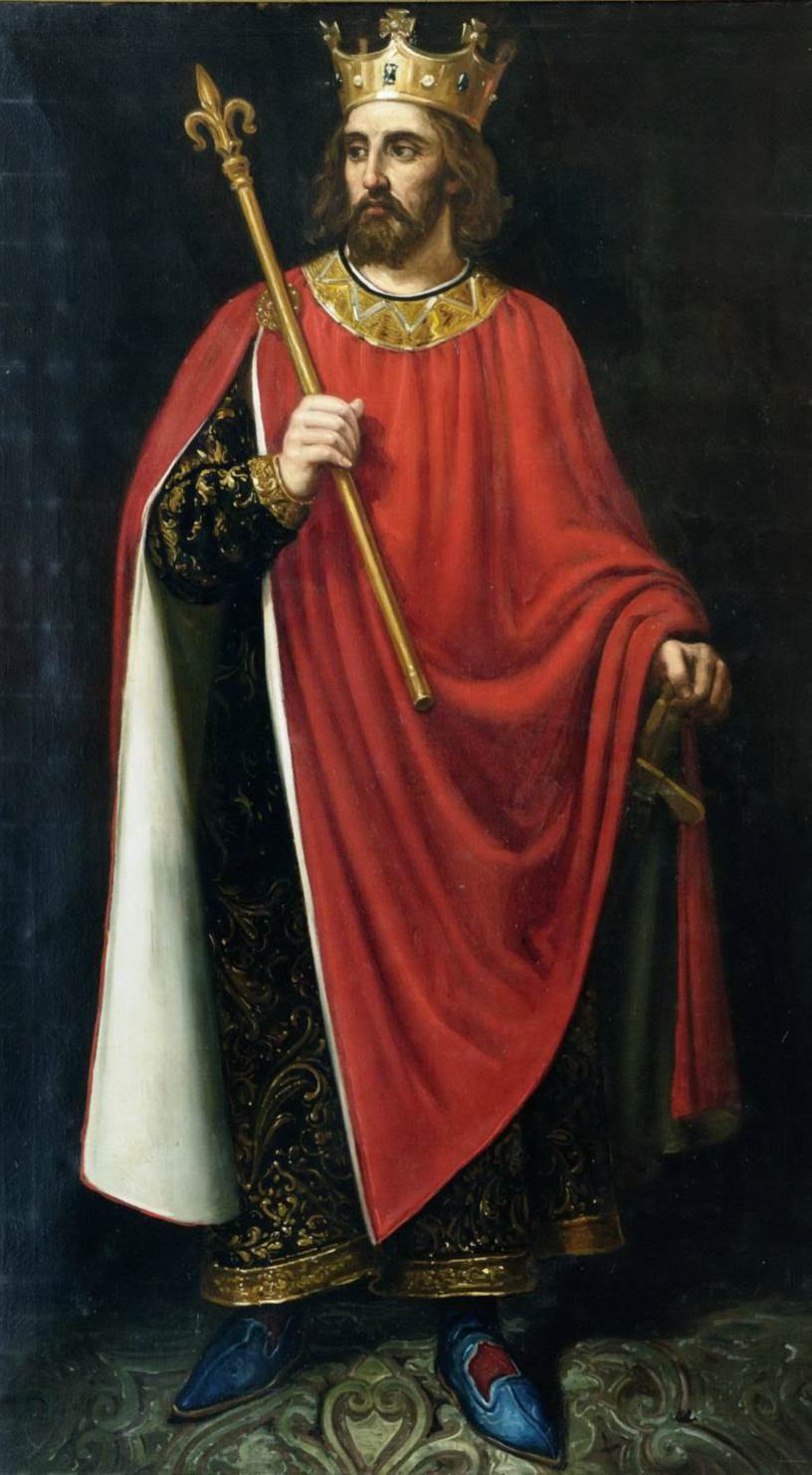
King Alfonso IV of León (r. 925–931)

Year 925 (CMXXV) was a common year starting on Saturday of the Julian calendar.

== Events ==
=== By date ===
==== January – June ====
- January 5 – Gabellus becomes the first abbot of the monsastery of San Martín de Albelda in the Spanish kingdom of Navarre.
- January – Hashim ibn Muhammad becomes the new ruler of the Banu Tujib, an Arab state in Spain, upon the death of his father, Muhammad al-Anqar al-Tujibi.
- May 15 – Nicholas I Mystikos, twice the Ecumenical Patriarch of Constantinople and having reigned a second time since 912, dies at the age of 73.
- May 23 – At Luoyang, Zhao Guangyin, the Grand Chancellor (equivalent to a Prime Minister) of the Emperor Li Cunxu of Later Tang dynasty China, dies. Zhao's duties are assumed by Li Cunxu's son, Prince Li Siyuan.
- June 29 — Stephen II becomes the new Ecumenical Patriarch of Constantinople and head of the Eastern Orthodox Church, succeeding Nicholas I.

==== July – December ====
- July 4 — At the age of 12, Shabbethai Donnolo, who will become one of the most prominent physicians in Italy and the doctor to the Byzantine court, is kidnapped by Arab slavers as a Fatimid expeditionary force, led by Jafar ibn Obeid, lands in Abruzzo in southern Italy and overruns Apulia and the city of Otranto. After defeating the Byzantine garrisons, the Arabs lay siege to the castle of Oria and destroy it, killing the defenders and taking the women and children as slaves back to North Africa. Donnolo's family pays a ransom and the Fatimid Amir Abu Ahmad Ja'far ibn 'Ubaid sets him free.
- August — In Spain, Fruela II, King of León and King of Galicia, dies and is temporarily succeeded by his son, Alfonso Fróilaz.
- September 4 — The coronation of Æthelstan as King of the Anglo-Saxons (comprising the united kingdoms of Wessex and Mercia) takes place on the island of Britain at Kingston upon Thames.
- September — The Chamberlain Ja'far ibn Ubayd of the Fatimid Caliphate returns to the Fatimid capital of Mahdiya (now in Tunisia) after a successful 17-month campaign to pillage the Byzantine-ruled island of Sicily.
- October — In Byzantium, John Mystikos, chief minister (paradynasteuon), is deposed by the Emperor Romanos I, flogged, and sent into exile in a monastery. He is replaced by the chamberlain (protovestiarios) Theophanes, who becomes the closest adviser of Emperor Romanos I. At this time the Byzantine Empire has been embroiled in a protracted and disastrous war with Tsar Simeon I of Bulgaria.
- November — In Baghdad (now in Iraq), Abdallah ibn Muhammad al-Khaqani is dismissed from his position as the Grand Vizier of the Abbasid Caliphate upon the insistence of the Abbasid commander Mu'nis al-Muzaffar.
- December 10 — In Pamplona in Spain, Jimeno II becomes the new King of Navarre in Spain upon the death of his brother, King Sancho I.
- December 15 — At Chengdu, capital of the Former Shu dynasty state in China, the Later Tang dynasty generals Li Jiji and Guo Chongtao accept the surrender of the surviving Shu official, Li Yan, representative of the Shu Emperor Wang Zongyan.
- December 28 — In China, Guo Chongtao, military commander of the Later Tang dynasty that rules from what is now the Henan province, has his deputy commanders Wang Zongbi, Wang Zongxun and Wang Zongwo arreted and executed on accusations of disloyalty, after receiving permission from Prince Li Jiji, 13 days after their victory over the Former Shu kingdom.
- December 30 — Wang Shenzhi, the Chinese ruler of the Min Kingdom (now part of the Fujian province, with a capital of Fuzhou), dies after a long illness and is succeeded by his eldest son, Wang Yanhan.

=== By place ===
==== Europe ====
- Summer – King Fruela II dies after a reign of only 14 months. He is succeeded by his son Alfonso Fróilaz who ascends the throne. With the support of King Jimeno II of Pamplona (later Navarra), Sancho Ordóñez, Alfonso, and Ramiro (the sons of the late King Ordoño II) revolt and drive their cousin Alfonso to the eastern marches of Asturias, then divide the kingdom amongst themselves. Alfonso IV ("the Monk") receives the crown of León, and Sancho I is acclaimed king of Galicia.
- Alberic I, duke of Spoleto, attempts to seize Rome on his own account. Pope John X organizes an uprising and expels him. Alberic flees to Orte, where he sends out messengers calling on the Magyars for assistance. But a mob in Orte, informed by papal agents, rises up and murders Alberic (approximate date).
- King Rudolph II of Burgundy (who also rules Italy) and his father-in-law, Burchard II of Swabia, lead a Burgundian expeditionary force over the Great St. Bernard Pass to confront Hugh of Provence. They head to the city of Ivrea where Rudolph's forces begin a civil war against Lombard partisans.
- Tomislav, duke of the Croatian duchies of Pannonia and Dalmatia, is crowned as king of Croatia. He forges an alliance with the Byzantines during the struggle with the Bulgarian Empire (approximate date).

==== Asia ====
- Winter – Former Shu, one of the Ten Kingdoms in China, is invaded by Later Tang forces of Emperor Zhuang Zong, who incorporates the kingdom into his domains.
- A visiting Uyghur delegation spurs the development of Khitan small script, based on alphabetic principles (approximate date).

=== By topic ===
==== Religion ====
- Ha-Mim proclaims himself a prophet and a messenger of Islam, among the Ghomara Berbers near the city of Tétouan (modern Morocco).

== Births ==
- May – Bruno I, archbishop and duke of Lotharingia (d. 965)
- Basil Lekapenos, Byzantine chief minister (d. 985) (approximate date)
- Conrad I, king of Burgundy (approximate date)
- Fujiwara no Kanemichi, Japanese statesman (d. 977)
- Gerberga, Frankish noblewoman (approximate date)
- Gwangjong (personal name: Wang So), king of Goryeo (d. 975)
- John I Tzimiskes, Byzantine emperor (approximate date)
- Judith, duchess regent of Bavaria (d. 985)
- Li Fang, Chinese scholar and official (d. 996)
- Pan Mei, general of the Song dynasty (d. 991) (approximate date)
- Qian Hongzun, heir apparent of Wuyue (d. 940)
- Thietmar, Margrave of Meissen (approximate date)
- Widukind of Corvey, Saxon chronicler (approximate date)

== Deaths ==
- March – Bertha, duchess regent of Lucca and Tuscany (b. 863)
- May 15 – Nicholas I Mystikos, Byzantine patriarch (b. 852)
- May 23 – Zhao Guangyin, chancellor of Later Tang
- July – Fruela II, king of Asturias and León
- August 3 – Cao, Chinese empress dowager
- December 10 – Sancho I, king of Pamplona
- December 28 – Wang Zongbi, general of Former Shu
- December 30 – Wang Shenzhi, founder of Min (b. 862)
- Alberic I, duke of Spoleto (approximate date)
- Cathal mac Conchobair, king of Connacht
- Abu Bakr al-Razi, Persian philosopher (approximate date)
- Sueiro Belfaguer, Portuguese nobleman (b. 875)
