= Lothair the Lame =

Lothair
- Father: Charles the Bald
- Mother: Ermentrude of Orléans

Lothair the Lame (French: Lothaire le Boiteux, c. 848 – 865) was a French prince, the third son and fourth child of Charles the Bald and Ermentrude of Orléans. As he was born disabled, his parents sent him away to a monastery early in life. In 861, he became a monk. In his last years he was abbot of Montier-en-Der and Saint-Germain of Auxerre, where he died in 865 at the age of 17 or 18.

== Sources ==
- Heidecker, Karl Josef (2010). The Divorce of Lothar II: Christian Marriage and Political Power in the Carolingian World. Translated by Guest, Tanis M. Cornell University Press. ISBN 9780801439292.
- McKitterick, Rosamond (1999). The Frankish Kingdoms under the Carolingians. Pearson Education Limited.
