= Edict of Pîtres =

864 act by West Frankish king Charles the Bald creating a cavalry force

The Edict of Pîtres (Medieval Latin: Edictum Pistense) was a capitulary promulgated at Pîtres on 25 June 864. It is often cited by historians as an example of successful government action on the part of Charles the Bald, king of West Francia.

At the time Vikings more than annually ravaged not only the Frankish coastlands but, with the aid of Europe's numerous navigable rivers, much of the interior also. A king was most valued who could defeat them in the field and prevent their attacks in the future. The purpose and primary effect of the Edict was long thought to be the protection of the cities and countryside from Viking raids.

Charles created a large force of cavalry upon which he could call as needed. He ordered all men who had horses or could afford horses to serve in the army as cavalrymen. This was one of the beginnings of the French chivalry so famous for the next seven centuries. The intention of Charles was to have a mobile force with which to descend upon the raiders before they could up and leave with their booty.

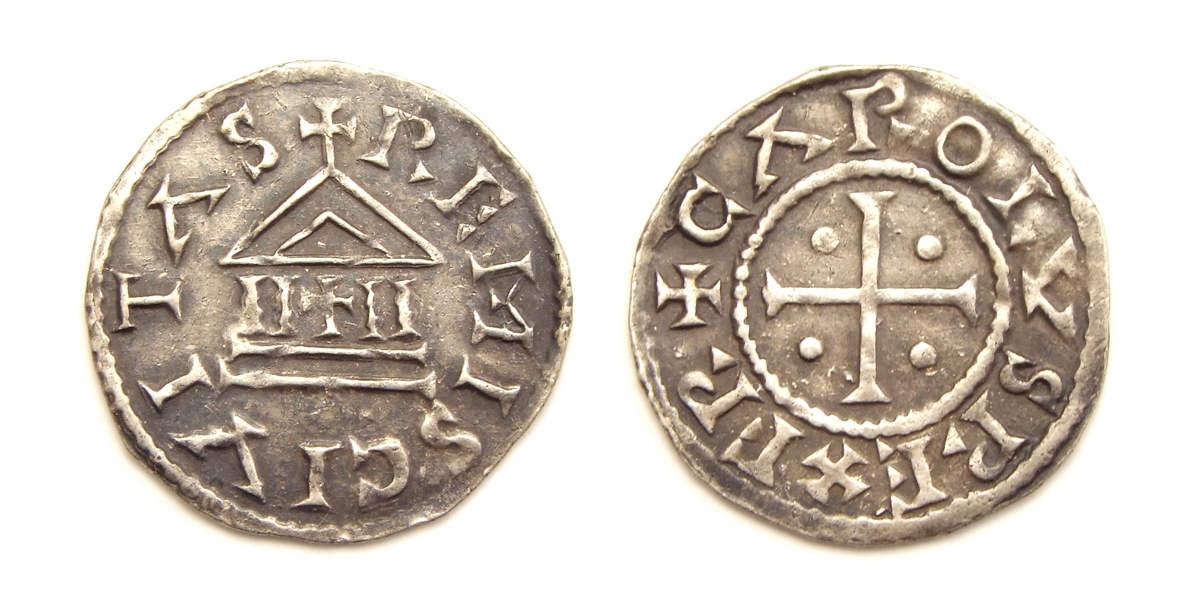
Denier (type Temple and cross) of Charles the Bald, minted at Reims between 840–864 (pre-Edict of Pîtres).

To prevent the Vikings from even attaining a great booty, Charles also declared that fortified bridges should be built at all towns on rivers. This was to prevent the dreaded longships from sailing into the interior. Simon Coupland believes that only two bridges, at Pont-de-l'Arche (near Pîtres) on the Seine and at Les Ponts-de-Cé on the Loire, were ever fortified, though a few others that had fallen into disrepair were rebuilt "in times of crisis in order to increase troop mobility". Charles also prohibited all trade in weapons with the Vikings, in order to prevent them from establishing bases in Gaul. The penalty for selling horses to the Vikings was death. Since the prohibition on the sale of horses was new, it is probable that mounted Viking raids were on the rise.

Aside from its auspicious military reforms, the Edict had political and economic consequences. King Pepin II of Aquitaine, against whom Charles had been fighting for decades, had been captured in 864 and was formally deposed at Pîtres. Economically, besides the prohibitions on commerce with the enemy, Charles tightened his control of the mints and regulated the punishment for counterfeiting. Prior to this edict at least nine places in France had the right of minting but these were reduced to three.

== Surviving manuscripts ==
There are twelve surviving manuscripts of the Edict across various collections: three in the Bibliothèque nationale de France, three in the Vatican Library, two in the Bavarian State Library, and one in each of the British Library, the Beinecke Rare Book and Manuscript Library in Yale University Library, the Stiftsbibliothek, and the Biblioteca Vallicelliana in Rome.

== Editions and translations ==
- Edition: "Edictum Pistense 864." A. Boretius and V. Krause, edd. MGH, Capitularia regum Francorum, 2. Hannover: 1897.
- Translation: Hill, Brian E. (April 2013), Charles the Bald's 'Edict of Pîtres' (864): a Translation and Commentary (PDF), University of Minnesota (MA thesis)
- Translation: Coupland, Simon. Edict of Pîtres
