= Tudwal Gloff =

Tudwal Gloff (English: Tudwal the Lame or Welsh: Tudwal ap Rhodri; born c. 860) was the youngest of the four sons of Rhodri the Great.

== Life ==
He earned his epithet 'the Lame' after being wounded in his knee at the Battle of the Conwy in 881 AD fighting alongside his brothers against the invading Mercians. Because he had become lame, his brothers gave him the territory of Uchelogoed Gwynedd and the chief churches of Gwynedd. The arms borne by Tudwal Gloff were azure, a wolf saliant argent, langued armed gules. He held the title Lord of Uchel Gwenydd. He married Helen, daughter of Aleth, ruler of Dyfed.
