= Al-Fadl ibn Qarin al-Tabari =

Al-Fadl ibn Qarin al-Tabari الفضل بن قارن الطبري

Abbasid Governor of the Hims
- In office 862 - 864
- Monarch: Al-Musta'in

Personal details
- Parent: Qarin al-Tabari

Al-Fadl ibn Qarin al-Tabari (Arabic: الفضل بن قارن الطبري) was a ninth century military commander and provincial governor for the Abbasid Caliphate. He served as the governor of Hims from 862 until he was killed during a revolt in 864.

== Career ==
Al-Fadl was the brother of Mazyar ibn Qarin, who had been the ruler of Tabaristan until an unsuccessful rebellion in 839, and his own nisbah of "al-Tabari" suggests an origin from that province. In 860 al-Fadl participated in the raids against the Byzantine Empire; commanding twenty vessels, he undertook a naval expedition and attacked the fortress of Attaleia in southwest Anatolia. Two years later he was appointed by the caliph al-Musta'in as governor of Hims, following a revolt which had resulted in the flight of its previous governor Kaydar ibn 'Abdallah al-Ushrusani. Upon arriving in the district he was approached by the local residents, who explained that their actions had been prompted by Kaydar's misrule, and he was able to enter the city of Hims without opposition.

Despite the peaceful start to his governorship, al-Fadl soon learned of a fresh plot by the people of Hims to rebel against him. He therefore rounded up a group of alleged leaders of the revolt, beheading some of them and sending one hundred notables to the caliph in Samarra. He also dismantled the city walls and ordered that the street pavements be removed. These measures, however, failed to stifle the unrest, and eventually the people of Hims and a group of the Banu Kalb united under the leadership of one 'Utayf ibn Ni'mah al-Kalbi and revolted against al-Fadl. The latter barricaded himself in the palace of Khalid ibn Yazid ibn Mu'awiyah, but was betrayed by his followers and handed over to the rebels who, after robbing him of his money and wives, killed him and hung his body on the city gates. Following his death, Hims remained in a state of rebellion until it was again pacified by the general Musa ibn Bugha al-Kabir.
