= Daniél ua Líahaiti =

Irish Abbot and poet

Daniél ua Líahaiti (died 863) was an Irish Abbot and poet.

Daniél was the Abbot of Lismore and Cork at the time of his death. The poem a ben, nennachta fort - na raid is ascribed to him.
