= Muhammad ibn al-Fadl al-Jarjara'i =

Muḥammad ibn al-Faḍl al-Jarjarāʾī (Arabic: محمد بن الفضل الجرجرائي) was a senior Abbasid official and vizier briefly in 847/8 and again in 863 until his death in 864/5.

As his nisba shows, he came from the locality of Jarjaraya, south of Baghdad. He was born in ca. 785 and began his career as secretary to the former vizier al-Fadl ibn Marwan. When Caliph al-Mutawakkil (reigned 847–861) dismissed the long-serving vizier Muhammad ibn al-Zayyat shortly after his accession, he appointed Muhammad in his place, but soon dismissed him as well due to negligence of his duties. Caliph al-Musta'in (r. 862–866) recalled him to the post in September/October 863, and he continued to occupy it until his death in 864/5.

== Sources ==
- Sourdel, Dominique (1965). "al-D̲j̲ard̲j̲arāʾī". In Lewis, B.; Pellat, Ch. & Schacht, J. (eds.). The Encyclopaedia of Islam, Second Edition. Volume II: C–G. Leiden: E. J. Brill. pp. 461–462. OCLC 495469475.

Preceded by Muhammad ibn al-Zayyat	Vizier of the Abbasid Caliphate; 847/8	Vacant Title next held by Ubayd Allah ibn Yahya ibn Khaqan
Preceded by	Vizier of the Abbasid Caliphate; 863–864/5	Succeeded by
