= Duan Chengshi =

Chinese poet and writer

Duan Chengshi (Chinese: 段成式; pinyin: Duàn Chéngshì; Wade–Giles: Tuan Ch'eng-shih) (died 863) was a Chinese poet of the Tang dynasty. He was born to a wealthy family in present-day Zibo, Shandong. A descendant of the early Tang official Duan Zhixuan (段志玄, Duàn Zhìxuán) (-642), and the son of Duan Wenchang (段文昌, Duàn Wénchāng), a high official under Tang Xuanzong, his family background enabled him to obtain office without taking the imperial exams. As a poet, he was associated with Li Shangyin and Wen Tingyun.

Duan is best known outside of China for being the author of an early version of Cinderella, called Ye Xian. In 853, the story first appeared in Miscellaneous Morsels from Youyang, which was published shortly after he returned to Chang'an after his term as acting prefectural Governor of Jizhou (now known as Ji'an in Jiangsu). It is believed that it was a folktale told by peasants before it was recorded on paper.

Duan is also known for describing in his written work of 863 AD the slave trade, ivory trade, and ambergris trade of Bobali, which believed to be what is now Berbera in Somaliland, East Africa.
