= Abbo of Auxerre =

Abbot, Bishop
- Died: 3 December 860
- Venerated in: Auxerre, St. Germain
- Feast: 3 December

Abbo of Auxerre was a Benedictine abbot and bishop of Auxerre.

He had been a monk, and later abbot, of the Abbey of Saint-Germain d'Auxerre, and succeeded his brother Heribald of Auxerre as bishop of Auxerre. He resigned from the see in 859. He assisted in the synod of Poncy in 860, and died on 3 December that year. He is not listed in the Roman Martyrology, the official but incomplete list of saints recognized by the Roman Catholic Church. His biography is included in Les Petits Bollandistes.

== Books ==
- Holweck, F. G., A Biographical Dictionary of the Saints. St. Louis, MO: B. Herder Book Co., 1924.
