= Al-Fadl ibn Marwan =

Al-Fadl ibn Marwan (Arabic: الفضل بن مروان; c. 774–864) was a Christian Arab official of the Abbasid Caliphate, who rose to become vizier under Caliph al-Mu'tasim (reigned 833–842). He was the first of a series of Iraqi Christian officials who would come to play a significant role in the Caliphate's administration during the 9th century.

Fadl began his career in the reign of Harun al-Rashid (r. 786–809) as a retainer of Harthama ibn A'yan, at the time head of the caliphal bodyguard. His administrative talent brought him to the attention of Harun, who appointed him a secretary in the diwan al-kharaj (the "Bureau of the Land Tax"). During the civil war that followed Harun's death, Fadl retired to his estates in Iraq. It was there that he came to the attention of Abu Ishaq, the younger brother of Caliph al-Ma'mun (r. 813–833) and future Caliph al-Mu'tasim, who valued is expert knowledge on taxation and agriculture. In 828, Abu Ishaq took him along to Egypt and then appointed him to head the diwan al-kharaj.

During al-Ma'mun's absence on campaign against the Byzantine Empire in 832–833, Fadl remained in Baghdad as the Caliph's deputy, and it was he who had the oath of allegiance (bay'ah) sworn to al-Mu'tasim when news came of al-Ma'mun's death. In September 833, he was appointed as vizier with wide-ranging powers, but his attempts to limit expenditure, and especially the Caliph's largesse to his courtiers, brought about his dismissal in February 836. He continued to serve Mu'tasim and his successors as an advisor on taxation issues until his death in 864, aged about 90.

== Sources ==
- Sourdel, Dominique (1965). "Al-Faḍl b. Marwān". In Lewis, B.; Pellat, Ch. & Schacht, J. (eds.). The Encyclopaedia of Islam, Second Edition. Volume II: C–G. Leiden: E. J. Brill. p. 730. OCLC 495469475.

Preceded by Muhammad ibn Yazdad	Vizier of the Abbasid Caliphate; 833–836	Succeeded by Muhammad ibn al-Zayyat
