= Gu Quanwu =

Gu Quanwu (顧全武)

Personal details
- Born: 864; Yuyao, Yue Prefecture, Tang dynasty
- Died: c. 931 (aged 66–67); Wuyue

Gu Quanwu
- Traditional Chinese: 顧全武
- Simplified Chinese: 顾全武
Transcriptions
Standard Mandarin
- Hanyu Pinyin: Gù Quánwǔ

Gu Quanwu (864–931) was a general and official during the late Tang dynasty and early Five Dynasties period, serving under the warlord Qian Liu who founded the Wuyue kingdom. He was nicknamed "Monk Gu" for having been a Buddhist monk during his youth. Gu was instrumental in helping Qian crush his former lord Dong Chang in 896. Gu also had much success against the warlord Yang Xingmi, although he was once captured by Yang's general Li Shenfu.
