= Aytos Valley =

Valley in Bulgaria

- Valley
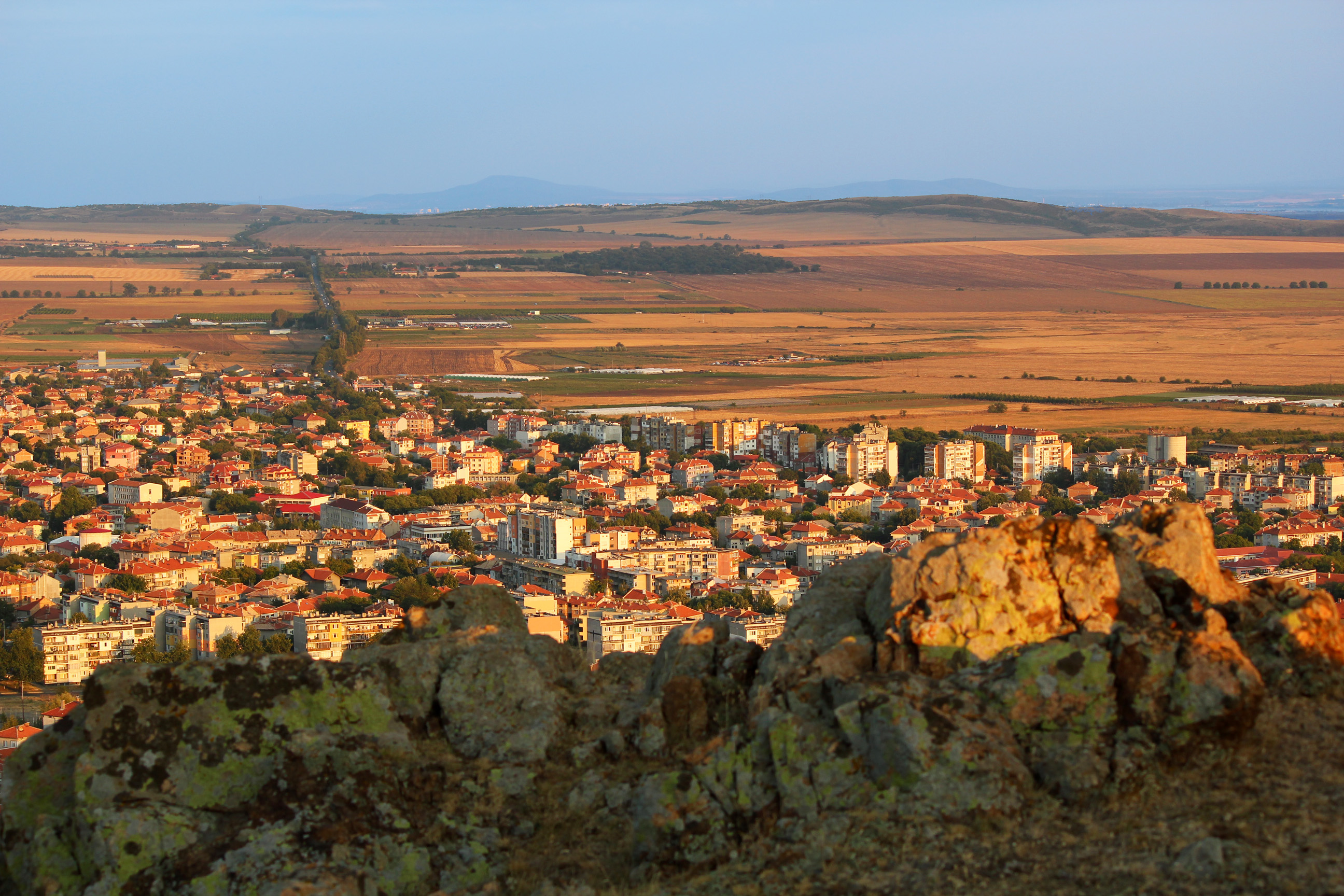
- A view of Aytos and the valley
- Interactive map of Aytos Valley
- Coordinates: 42°40′45″N 27°15′22″E
- Location: Bulgaria

Area
  - Total: 108 km^{2} (42 sq mi)

Dimensions
  - Length: 24 km (15 mi)
  - Width: 7 km (4.3 mi)

Aytos Valley (Bulgarian: Айтоска котловина) is situated in eastern Bulgaria and is the easternmost and lowermost of the eleven Sub-Balkan valleys. It is named after its main settlement, the town of Aytos.

== Geography ==
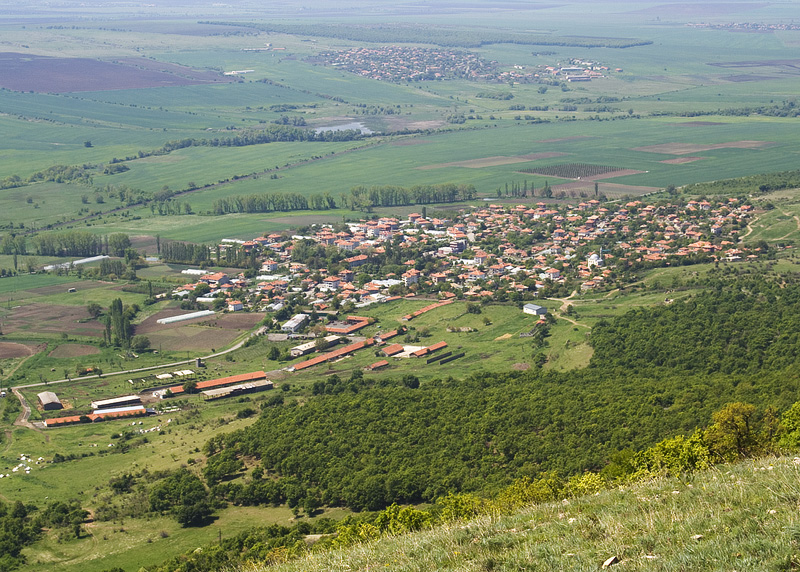
A view of the valley at Topolitsa

The valley lies between the Karnobat and Aytos divisions of the Balkan Mountains to the north and northeast respectively, and the Hisar Heights to the southwest. To the south it opens widely to the Burgas Plain and to the west a low saddle in the area of the village of Chernograd links it with the Karnobat Valley.

The valley spans a territory of 108 km^{2}. It reaches a length of 24 km from northwest to southeast; its width varies between 3 and 7 km, averaging at 4.5 km. The average altitude is 70–150 m, with inclination in southern direction.

The bottom of the valley is filled with river sediments, and further north at the foothills of the Balkan Mountains — with alluvial cones. The southern reaches are partially marshy. It is drained by the Aytoska reka and its tributary the Alansko dere. The valley lies in the transitional zone between the temperate continental climatic zone and the continental Mediterranean zone, with an influence from the nearby Black Sea. The mean annual precipitation is 500–550 mm. The soils are alluvial in the river valleys, and cinnamon, smolnitsi and rendzina in the rest of the area.

== Settlements and transportation ==
Administratively, the valley falls entirely in Burgas Province. The settlements include the town of Aytos and seven villages — Karageorgievo, Karanovo, Malka Polyana, Pirne, Polyanovo, Sadievo and Topolitsa, all of them in Aytos Municipality.

The valley is served by three roads of the national network, as well as local roads. From west to east passes a 22.2 km stretch of the first class I-6 road Gyueshevo–Sofia–Karlovo–Burgas. In direction north–south runs a 6.8 km section of the third class III-208 road Vetrino–Provadia–Aytos. In the same direction the valley is also traversed by an 8.2 km section of the third class III-539 road Sredets–Troyanovo–Aytos.

The region is traversed by a section of railway line No. 8 Plovdiv–Stara Zagora–Burgas in direction northwest–southeast between the crossing over the train stations of Chernograd and Balgarovo.

Most of the Aytos Valley is occupied by arable land, mainly used for growing cereals, industrial crops, orchards and viticulture.

== Sources ==
- Георгиев (Georgiev), Владимир (Vladimir) (1978). Енциклопедия България. Том I. А-В [Encyclopaedia Bulgaria. Volume I. A-V] (in Bulgarian). и колектив. София (Sofia): Издателство на БАН (Bulgarian Academy of Sciences Press).
- Мичев (Michev), Николай (Nikolay); Михайлов (Mihaylov), Цветко (Tsvetko); Вапцаров (Vaptsarov), Иван (Ivan); Кираджиев (Kiradzhiev), Светлин (Svetlin) (1980). Географски речник на България [Geographic Dictionary of Bulgaria] (in Bulgarian). София (Sofia): Наука и култура (Nauka i kultura).
