= 917 =

Calendar year

917 in various calendars
- Gregorian calendar: 917; CMXVII
- Ab urbe condita: 1670
- Armenian calendar: 366; ԹՎ ՅԿԶ
- Assyrian calendar: 5667
- Balinese saka calendar: 838–839
- Bengali calendar: 323–324
- Berber calendar: 1867
- Buddhist calendar: 1461
- Burmese calendar: 279
- Byzantine calendar: 6425–6426
- Chinese calendar: 丙子年 (Fire Rat); 3614 or 3407 — to — 丁丑年 (Fire Ox); 3615 or 3408
- Coptic calendar: 633–634
- Discordian calendar: 2083
- Ethiopian calendar: 909–910
- Hebrew calendar: 4677–4678
- Hindu calendars
- Vikram Samvat: 973–974
- Shaka Samvat: 838–839
- Kali Yuga: 4017–4018
- Holocene calendar: 10917
- Iranian calendar: 295–296
- Islamic calendar: 304–305
- Japanese calendar: Engi 17 (延喜１７年)
- Javanese calendar: 816–817
- Julian calendar: 917; CMXVII
- Korean calendar: 3250
- Minguo calendar: 995 before ROC 民前995年
- Nanakshahi calendar: −551
- Seleucid era: 1228/1229 AG
- Thai solar calendar: 1459–1460
- Tibetan calendar: མེ་ཕོ་བྱི་བ་ལོ་ (male Fire-Rat); 1043 or 662 or −110 — to — མེ་མོ་གླང་ལོ་ (female Fire-Ox); 1044 or 663 or −109

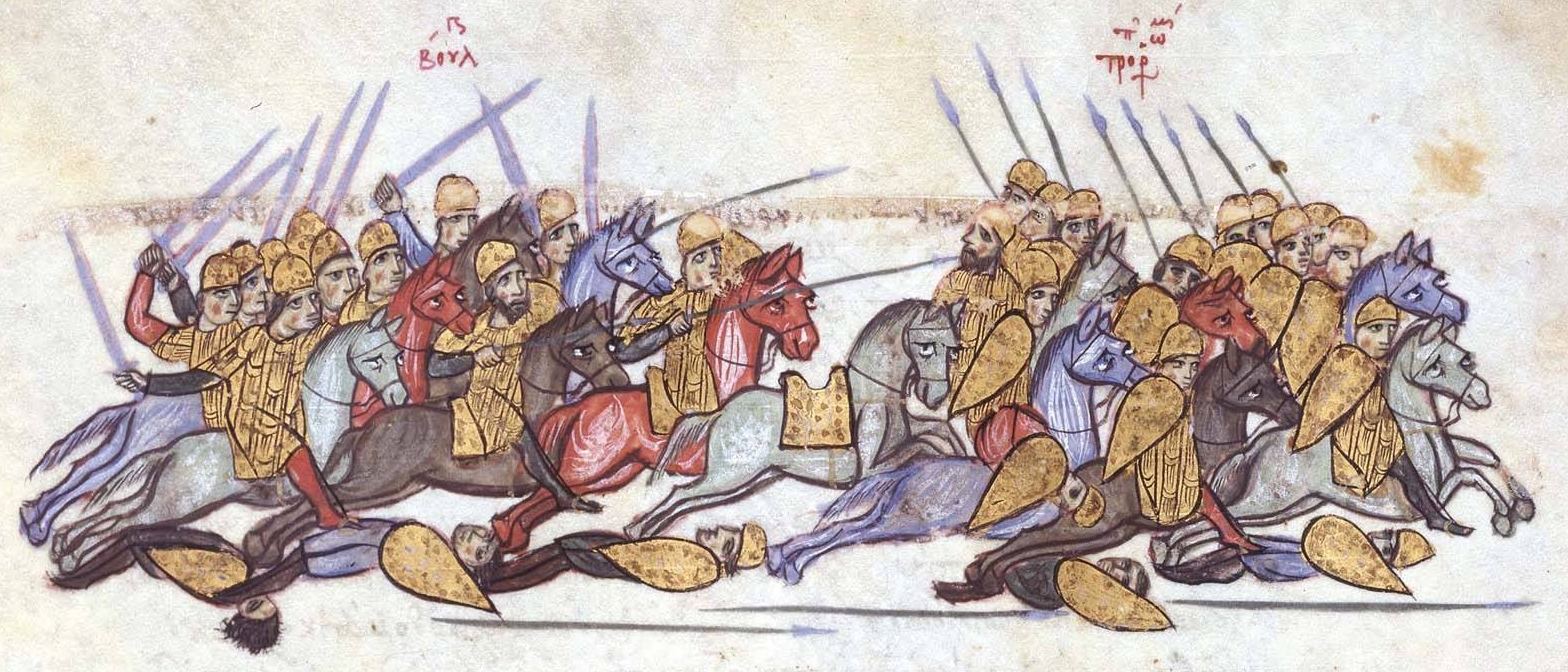
The Bulgarian victory at the Achelous River.

Map of the Battle of Achelous.

Year 917 (CMXVII) was a common year starting on Wednesday of the Julian calendar.

== Events ==
=== By place ===
==== Byzantine Empire ====
- August 20 – Battle of Achelous: A Byzantine expeditionary force (62,000 men) under General Leo Phokas (the Elder) is routed by the Bulgarians at the Achelous River near the fortress of Anchialos (modern Pomorie) on the Black Sea coast. Phokas flees to Mesembria (modern Nesebar) and escapes by boarding a ship. Tsar Simeon I (the Great) becomes de facto ruler of the whole Balkan Peninsula, except the well-protected Byzantine capital of Constantinople and the Peloponnese.
- Fall – Battle of Katasyrtai: The Bulgarian army under Simeon I marches southwards to Constantinople. Leo Phokas, who survived at Anchelous, gathers the last Byzantine troops to intercept the Bulgarians before they reach the capital. The two armies meet near the village of Katasyrtai, just outside Constantinople. After a surprise night attack, the Byzantines are completely routed from the battlefield.

==== Europe ====
- Bulgarian–Serbian War: Simeon I sends a Bulgarian expeditionary force under Theodore Sigritsa and Marmais to Serbia. The two persuade Petar Gojniković, a Serbian prince who formed an anti-Bulgarian coalition, to meet for a peace agreement. They seize him and send the rebellious prince to the Bulgarian capital of Preslav, where he dies in prison. Simeon replaces Petar with Pavle Branović, a grandson of prince Mutimir, who lives in Preslav. Serbia becomes a puppet state until 921.
- The Hungarians, after attacking Swabia, sack and burn Basel (modern Switzerland). They invade Lorraine in Lotharingia, destroying Verdun and Moyenmoutier, and many monasteries in Alsace. Duke Arnulf I (the Bad) with Hungarian military aid, reconquers his land from King Conrad I of the East Frankish Kingdom. After this event, Bavaria and Swabia agree to pay tribute to the Hungarians.
- Battle of Confey: The Norse Vikings under Sigtrygg Caech defeat and kill King Augaire mac Ailella of Leinster in battle. Sigtrygg re-captures Dublin and establishes himself as king, while his kinsman Ragnall ua Ímair returns to England to become King of Northumbria.

==== Britain ====
- Summer – Lady Æthelflæd of Mercia cements an alliance with King Constantine II of Scotland against Norse York. She captures the fortress at Derby (belonging to the Five Boroughs of the Danelaw), while her brother, King Edward the Elder, takes Towcester. Æthelflæd's armies also ravage Brycheiniog (Wales) in revenge for killing the Mercian abbot Ecbryht (see 916).
- Battle of Tempsford: The English army led by Edward the Elder defeats the Danish Vikings at Tempsford. They storm the fortified burh and kill King Guthrum II of East Anglia, along with the Danish Jarls Toglos and Manna.

==== Islamic Empire ====
- Battle of San Esteban de Gormaz: Umayyad forces under Abi-Abda besiege the repoblación of San Esteban de Gormaz (Northern Spain). King Ordoño II of León (supported by his brother Fruela II of Asturias) allies himself with Sancho I, king of Pamplona, and defeats the Moors. Abi-Abda is captured and executed by decapitation.

==== Asia ====
- September 5 – The Great Yue Kingdom, later renamed Southern Han, is founded by Liu Yan, former governor and military advisor, in Panyu (modern Guangdong) and Guangxi. Liu Yan declares himself emperor, and gives his niece Liu Hua in marriage to Wang Yanjun, a son of his rival Wang Shenzhi (Prince of Min), to cement a relationship between the two states.

== Births ==
- September 20 – Kyunyeo, Korean poet (d. 973)
- Ibn Battah al-Ukbari, Arab theologian (d. 997)
- Kamo no Yasunori, Japanese spiritual advisor (d. 977)
- Theophylactus, patriarch of Constantinople (d. 956)

== Deaths ==
- January 21 – Erchanger, East Frankish nobleman
- August 5 – Euthymius I, patriarch of Constantinople
- August 20 – Constantine Lips, Byzantine admiral
- Al-'Abbas ibn 'Amr al-Ghanawi, Abbasid governor
- Augaire mac Ailella, king of Leinster (Ireland)
- Frederuna, West Frankish queen (b. 887)
- Guthrum II, king of East Anglia (England)
- Hasan al-Utrush, emir of Tabaristan (Iran)
- Nicholas Picingli, Byzantine general
- Petar Gojniković, Serbian prince
- Radboud, archbishop of Utrecht
- Sindeok, king of Silla (Korea)
