= Aheloy (river) =

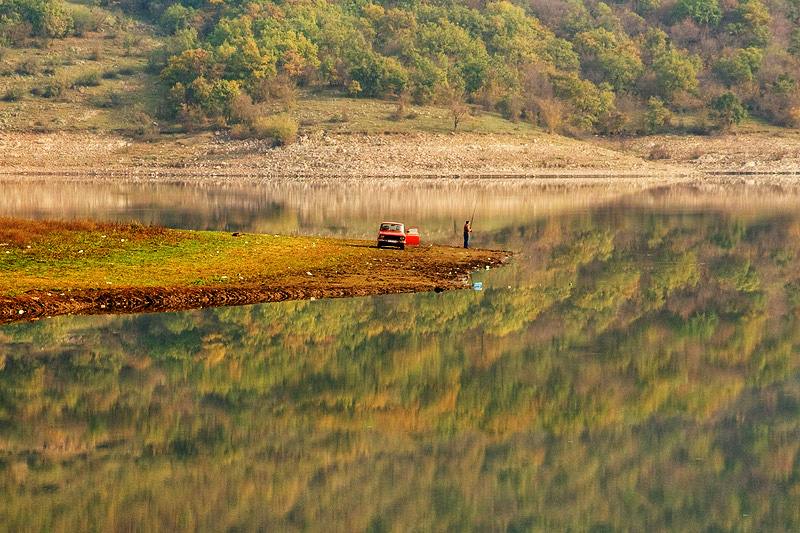
- The Aheloy Reservoir along the river

Location
- Country: Bulgaria

Physical characteristics
- Source
  - location: Aytos Mountain
  - coordinates: 42°40′44.04″N 27°23′53.16″E
  - elevation: 166 m (545 ft)
- Mouth
  - location: Black Sea
  - coordinates: 42°38′2.04″N 27°38′26.16″E
  - elevation: 0 m (0 ft)
- Length: 40 km (25 mi)
- Basin size: 141 km^{2} (54 sq mi)

The Aheloy (Bulgarian: Ахелой), also known as the Achelous, is a river in eastern Bulgaria. It is 40 km long. The river is famous for being the site of the Battle of Achelous that took place on 20 August 917 between Bulgarian ruler Simeon I and the Byzantines under Leo Phocas during the Byzantine–Bulgarian war of 913–927. It was one of the largest battles in the Middle Ages and among the greatest military successes of the First Bulgarian Empire.

The main stem is the Arnautska reka, which springs from the Aytoska Planina division of the eastern Balkan Mountains east of the village of Dryankovets. The river proper is formed from the confluence of the Arnautska reka with the Mangarska reka at an altitude of 166 m, about three kilometers east of the village of Belodol. The Aheloy flows eastwards in a wide alluvial valley until the village of Aleksandrovo, where it turns southeast for the remainder of its length. It flows into the Gulf of Burgas of the Black Sea near a campsite some 1.2 km south of the town of Aheloy.

Its drainage basin covers a territory of 141 km^{2}. To the north its basin follows the ridge of the Aytoska Planina, which separates it from the basin of the river Hadzhiyska reka. To the west it borders the drainage system of the Aytoska reka, and to the south it is limited by the basins of several small rivers and streams flowing directly into the Black Sea. The river has predominantly rain feed with high water in February–March and low water in August–September. The average annual flow near the town of Aheloy is 0.7 m^{3}/s; water mineralization is 500–600 mg/m^{3}.

The Aheloy flows entirely in Burgas Province. There are four settlements along its course, Draganovo in Burgas Municipality and Medovo, Aleksandrovo and Aheloy (town) in Pomorie Municipality. Its waters are utilised for irrigation. The Aheloy Reservoir with a volume of 12.7 million m^{3} has been constructed along its course in 1964 to irrigate a territory of 23 km^{2}.
