= 924 =

Calendar year

924 in various calendars
- Gregorian calendar: 924; CMXXIV
- Ab urbe condita: 1677
- Armenian calendar: 373; ԹՎ ՅՀԳ
- Assyrian calendar: 5674
- Balinese saka calendar: 845–846
- Bengali calendar: 330–331
- Berber calendar: 1874
- Buddhist calendar: 1468
- Burmese calendar: 286
- Byzantine calendar: 6432–6433
- Chinese calendar: 癸未年 (Water Goat); 3621 or 3414 — to — 甲申年 (Wood Monkey); 3622 or 3415
- Coptic calendar: 640–641
- Discordian calendar: 2090
- Ethiopian calendar: 916–917
- Hebrew calendar: 4684–4685
- Hindu calendars
- Vikram Samvat: 980–981
- Shaka Samvat: 845–846
- Kali Yuga: 4024–4025
- Holocene calendar: 10924
- Iranian calendar: 302–303
- Islamic calendar: 311–312
- Japanese calendar: Enchō 2 (延長２年)
- Javanese calendar: 823–824
- Julian calendar: 924; CMXXIV
- Korean calendar: 3257
- Minguo calendar: 988 before ROC 民前988年
- Nanakshahi calendar: −544
- Seleucid era: 1235/1236 AG
- Thai solar calendar: 1466–1467
- Tibetan calendar: ཆུ་མོ་ལུག་ལོ་ (female Water-Sheep); 1050 or 669 or −103 — to — ཤིང་ཕོ་སྤྲེ་ལོ་ (male Wood-Monkey); 1051 or 670 or −102

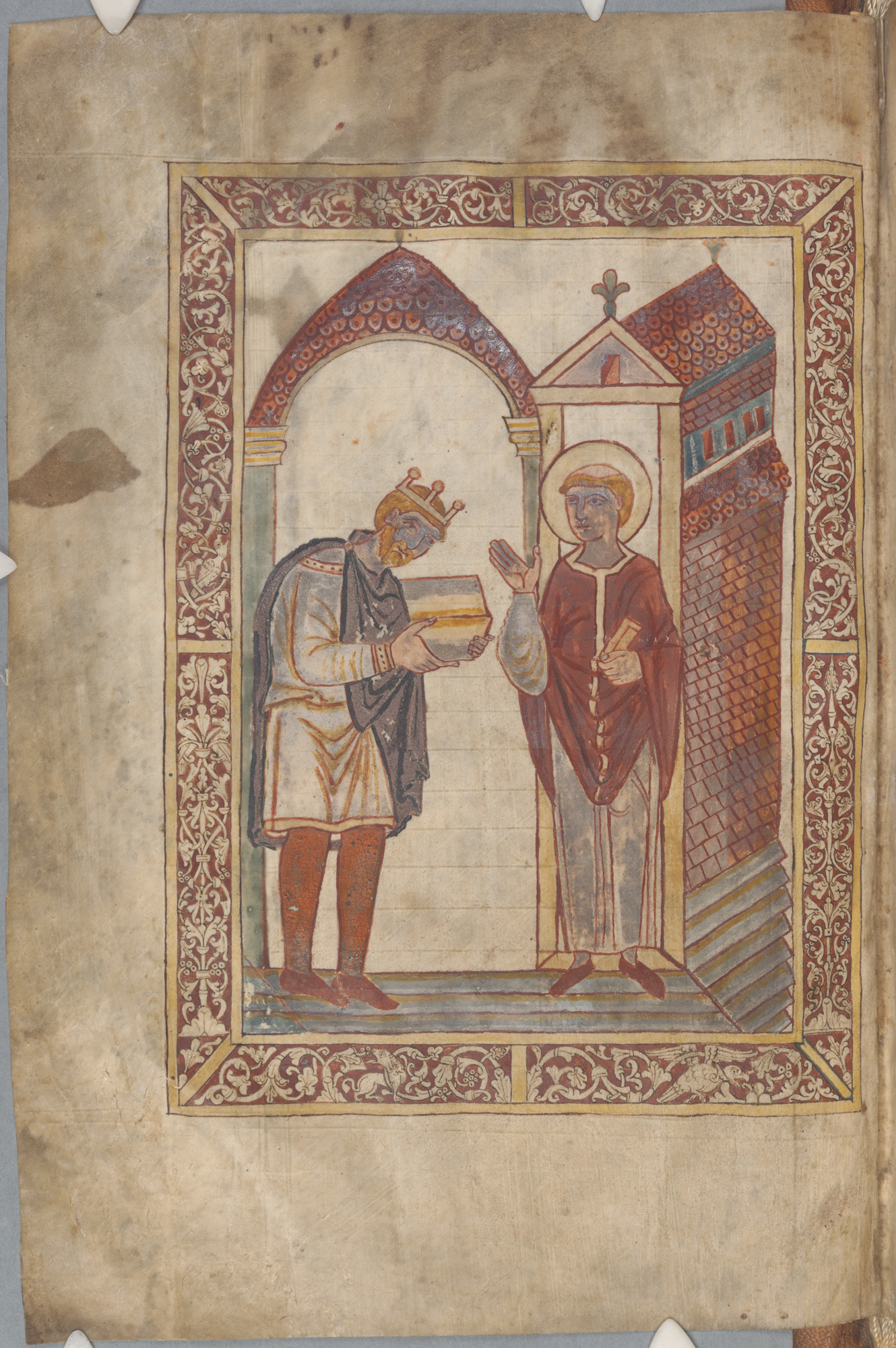
July 17: Æthelstan becomes King of the Anglo-Saxons upon the death of his father, King Edward the Elder. Æthelstan is seen here presenting a book to Cuthbert, in a painting from Chester-le-Street

Year 924 (CMXXIV) was a leap year starting on Thursday of the Julian calendar.

== Events ==
=== January—March ===
- January 5 – The monastery of San Martín de Albelda is founded in the Kingdom of Navarre in what is now the city of Albelda de Iregua in Spain, by orders of King Sancho Garcés I and Toda Aznárez, monarchs of Navarre, to celebrate the previous year's recapture of the cities of Nájera and Viguera.
- January 20 – China's Emperor Zhuangzong reverses an initial decision to spare the life of General Li Jitao after discovering that Li is continuing to plot the overthrow of the government, and has Li executed.
- February 12 – (1 Dhu al-Qi'dah 311 A.H.) Ahmad ibn Kayghalagh is removed from office as the Abbasid Governor of Egypt by the Caliph al-Muqtadir after less than six months in office and is replaced by Takin al-Khazari. who, following his death, sack and burn the city of Pavia. They Hungarian forces penetrate as far as the Pyrenees.
- March 24 – Hungarian Magyar forces led by General Szalárd, capture Pavia, capital of the Kingdom of Italy within the Holy Roman Empire, at the request of the Holy Roman Emperor Berengar. Later, after crossing the Alps via the St. Bernard Pass, the Magyars pillage Provence, Septimania and Nismes in southern France).
- March – A group of 1,800 warriors of the Qarmatians of Bahrayn attack and destroy the returning Hajj caravans at al-Habir. Some of the more prominent pilgrims, who were returning to Baghdad from Mecca, are taken to Al-Ahsa Oasis to be held for ransom. The event leads to the downfall and execution of the Abbasid Caliphate's vizier, Ibn al-Furat.

=== April—June ===
- April 7 – After having made a new alliance with the Hungarians, the Holy Roman Emperor Berengar I, King of Italy, is assassinated in Verona by one of his guards. Rudolph II, King of Burgundy and a claimant to the throne, takes full control of the Kingdom of Italy, while the office of the Holy Roman Emperor will not be re-created until 38 years later.
- June 15 – Abu'l-Hasan Ali ibn al-Furat, the Grand Vizier of the Abbasid Caliph al-Muqtadir since returning to power in August 923, is removed from office by the Caliph, and is replaced by Abdallah ibn Muhammad al-Khaqani. On July 24, he is executed along with his son, al-Muhassin, for his brutality during his rule and for failing to prevent the March attack by the Qarmatians on Iraqi Muslim pilgrims.
- June – Fruela II, King of Asturias in what is now Portugal, becomes the new ruler of the Kingdom of León and the Kingdom of Galicia in Spain upon the death of his younger brother, King Ordoño II, who dies after a 14-year reign. The ascent of Fruela reunites Asturias, Galicia and Leon. Fruela, who is not popular with the nobles, orders the assassination of the sons of Olmundo.

=== July—September ===
- July 17 – Edward the Elder, King of the Anglo-Saxons, is killed in battle at Farndon-Upon-Dee while leading an army against a revolt by some of the Cambrians and Mercians. During his 25-year reign, he gained direct control over Mercia, including some of the Danelaw, the Danish-occupied areas. Edward's oldest son, Æthelstan, is proclaimed the new King of England, while some supporters among the West Saxons support Ælfweard, to be Edward's successor as King of Wessex.
- August 2 – Ælfweard of Wessex, briefly a claimant for the throne of England and favored by the nobility of Wessex, dies at the age of 23 only sixteen days after the death of his father.
- August – In what is now South Korea, at Seorabeo (now Gyeongju in South Korea), Gyeongae becomes the new monarch of the Kingdom of Silla upon the death of his older brother, King Gyeongmyeong.
- September 7 – Byzantine–Bulgarian War: Tsar Simeon I, ruler (knyaz) of the Bulgarian Empire, leads the burning of the Church of St. Mary of the Spring in Constantinople.
- September 9 – After pillaging the suburbs of Constantinople, Tsar Simeon I of Bulgaria meets with the Byzantine Emperor Romanos I Lekapenos on the Golden Horn to arrange a truce, according to which Byzantium will pay the Bulgarians an annual tribute in exchangefor the return of some cities on the Black Sea coast.

=== October—December ===
- November 9 – Byzantine co-Emperor Romanos I Lekapenos concludes a treaty with the Tsar Simeon I of Bulgaria and provides the Bulgarian monarch with "gold and silver shields and lances."
- November – (Shaban 312 AH) Hamd bin Khazar, leader of the Zenata Berber nomads in the high plateau of central Algeria, sets an ambush that kills Massala ibn Habus, the Fatimid Governor of Tahert.
- December 25 – Stephen Lekapenos and Constantine Lekapenos are promoted to the position of co-Emperors of Byzantium, joining Constantine VII, Romanos I and Christopher, creating a pentarchy with five monarchs.

=== By place ===
==== Europe ====
- Fall – Bulgarian–Serbian War: Tsar Simeon I sends a punitive expedition force against Serbia, led by Theodore Sigritsa and Marmais, but they are ambushed and defeated. Zaharija, prince of the Serbs, sends their heads and armour later to Constantinople (approximate date).
- Winter – The Hungarians invade Saxony and force King Henry I (the Fowler) to retreat into the Castle of Werla. He makes a pact and agrees to pay them tribute for 9 years. They return to the Po Valley and sack the cities of Bergamo, Brescia and Mantua (Northern Italy).

==== Asia ====
- Emperor Taizu of the Liao Dynasty leads a campaign to the West. He reaches the former capital of the Uyghur Khaganate, Ordu-Baliq, on the Orkhon River. The Zubu begin to pay tribute to the Khitan Empire.
- Emperor Zhuang Zong of Later Tang bestows the chancellor title on Gao Jixing (Prince of Nanping) and creates the Nanping State (Central China). The Qi State falls to Later Tang.

== Births ==
- Fujiwara no Koretada, Japanese statesman and waka poet (d. 972)
- Fujiwara no Yoritada, Japanese nobleman and regent (d. 989)
- Gao Baoxu, king of Nanping (Ten Kingdoms) (d. 962)
- Li Jingda, prince of Southern Tang (d. 971)
- Nyaung-u Sawrahan, king of the Pagan dynasty (d. 1001)
- Đinh Bộ Lĩnh, Emperor of Viet Nam (d.979)

== Deaths ==
- January 20 – Li Jitao, general of Later Tang
- February – Ibn Khuzayma, Muslim hadith and scholar (b. 838)
- April 7 – Berengar I, king of Italy and Holy Roman Emperor
- April 11 – Herman I, archbishop of Cologne
- May 17 – Li Maozhen, Chinese warlord and king (b. 856)
- June 16 – Li Cunshen, general of Later Tang (b. 862)
- July 17 – Edward the Elder, king of Wessex
- July 18 – Abu'l-Hasan Ali ibn al-Furat, Abbasid vizier (b. 855)
- August 2 – Ælfweard, son of Edward the Elder
- Damian of Tarsus, Muslim governor
- Gyeongmyeong, king of Silla (Korea)
- Marmais, Bulgarian nobleman
- Ordoño II, king of Galicia and León
- Raymond II, Frankish nobleman
- Theodore Sigritsa, Bulgarian minister
- Yuan Xiangxian, Chinese general
- Zaharija, prince of Serbia (approximate date)
