= Aleksandrovo =

Aleksandrovo may refer to several geographical locations:

== In Croatia ==
- Aleksandrovo, Primorje-Gorski Kotar County, a former name of Punat (1921–1943)
- Aleksandrovo, Split-Dalmatia County, a former name of Ploče

== In Serbia ==
- Aleksandrovo, Merošina, a village in Nišava District
- Aleksandrovo, Nova Crnja, a village in Nova Crnja municipality, Vojvodina, Serbia
- Aleksandrovo, Subotica, a city quarter of Subotica, Vojvodina, Serbia

== In Bulgaria ==
- Aleksandrovo kurgan, a Thracian kurgan in south-eastern Bulgaria
- Aleksandrovo, Burgas Province, Burgas Province
- Aleksandrovo, Haskovo Province, Haskovo Province
- Aleksandrovo, Lovech Province, Lovech Province
- Aleksandrovo, Shumen Province, Shumen Province
- Aleksandrovo, Stara Zagora Province, Stara Zagora Province
- Aleksandrovo, Targovishte Province, Targovishte Province
- Aleksandrovo, Veliko Tarnovo Province, Veliko Tarnovo Province
- Aleksandrovo, Yambol Province, Yambol Province
