= Polyanovo =

Polyanovo may refer to:

- In Bulgaria (written in Cyrillic as Поляново):
  - Polyanovo, Burgas Province - a village in the Aytos municipality, Burgas Province
  - Polyanovo, Haskovo Province - a village in the Harmanli municipality, Haskovo Province
