= Melka =

Melka may refer to:

- Melka (surname)
- Melka Kunture, a Paleolithic site in Ethiopia
- Melka Suftu, a town in Ethiopia
- Melka Wakena Hydroelectric Power Station, Ethiopia

== See also ==
- Malka (disambiguation)
