= Malka =

Malka or Malkah may refer to:

== Places ==
- Malka (river), a river in Kabardino-Balkaria in Russia
- Malka Balo, one of the districts in the Oromia Region of Ethiopia
- Malka Hans, Punjab, a town in Pakistan
- Malka Jara, a settlement in Kenya's Coast Province
- Malka, Kamchatka Krai, a village on the Kamchatka Peninsula in Russia
- Malka Mari, a settlement in Kenya's Eastern Province
- Malka, Pakistan, a town of Gujrat District in the Punjab province of Pakistan
- Malka Polyana, a village in the municipality of Aytos in Burgas Province, Bulgaria
- Malka Smolnitsa, a village in the municipality of Dobrichka in Dobrich Province, Bulgaria
- Malka, Jordan, a town in northern Jordan

== People ==
=== Surname ===
- Judah ben Nissim Ibn Malka, a Moroccan-Jewish writer and philosopher of the 13th century
- Marie Ortal Malka, Israeli musician
- Moti Malka, an Israeli footballer
- Motti Malka, mayor of the Israeli city of Kiryat Malakhi
- Zadok Malka, a former Israeli footballer

=== Given name ===
- Malka Hebrew: מלכה is a Hebrew female name literally meaning "queen":
  - Malka Drucker, an American rabbi
  - Malka Lee, (1904–1976), an American poet
  - Malka Marom, Canadian journalist
  - Malka Older, an American author, academic, and humanitarian aid worker
  - Malka Spigel, Israeli musician and artist
  - Malka Zimetbaum (1918–1944), or Mala Zimetbaum, a Belgian-Jewish escapee from Auschwitz

== Other ==
- Melaveh Malkah (also Melave Malka or Melava Malka), a meal that is customarily held by Jews after their Sabbath
- Holy Leaven (Malka), a sacrament of the Church of the East
- Minnette Lehmann (pseudonym Malka), American artist

== See also ==
- Malča, a village in Serbia
- Melka (disambiguation)
