= Karanovo =

Karanovo may refer to:

- Karanovo, Burgas Province, a village in the Aytos municipality, Burgas Province, Bulgaria
- Karanovo, Sliven Province, a village in the Nova Zagora municipality, Sliven Province, Bulgaria; an early Neolithic settlement
- Karanovo culture, a Neolithic culture named after Karanovo, Sliven Province
