= Aytos =

Aytos Айтос
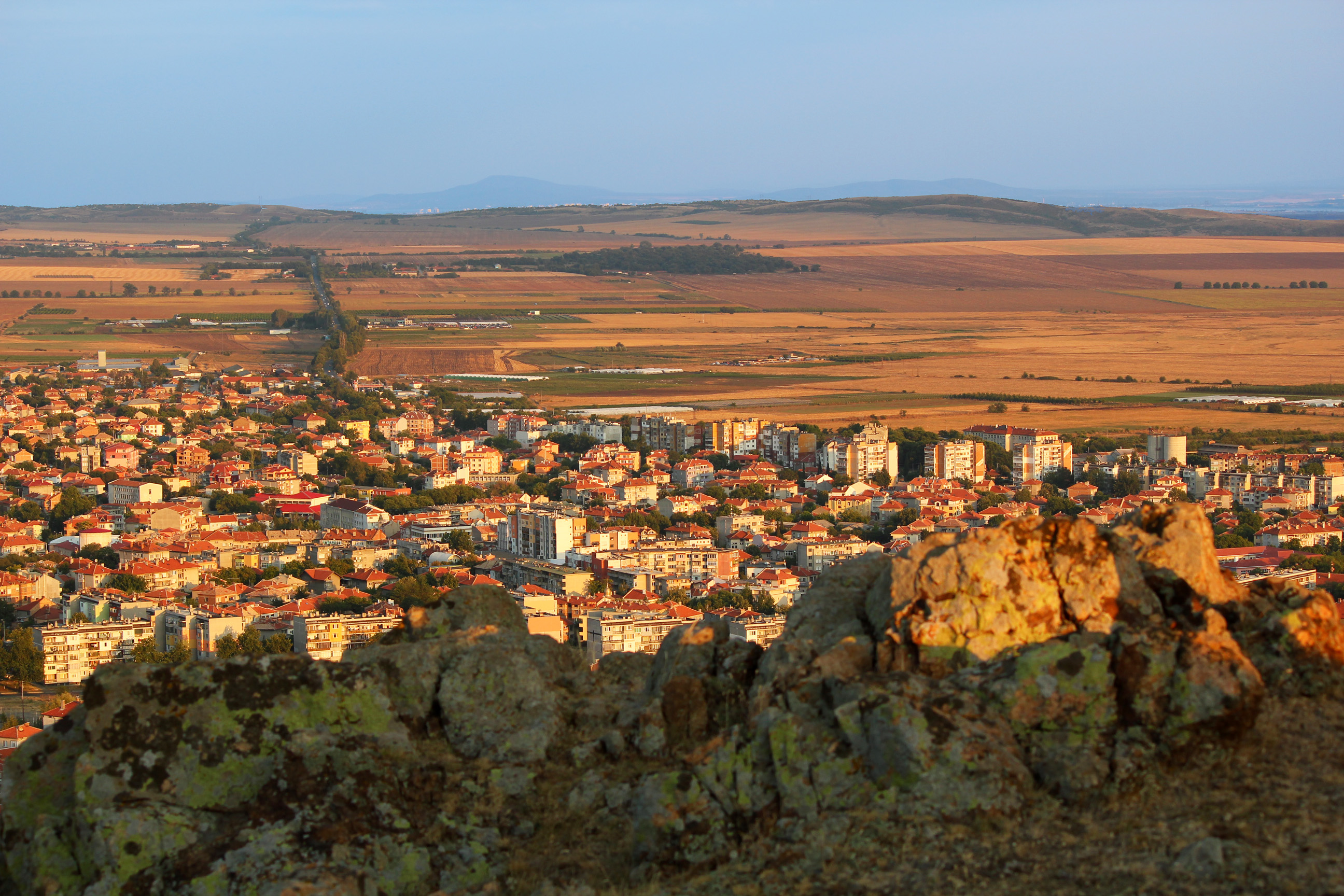
- Aytos from the Hisarya Heights above town

- Location of Aytos
- Coordinates: 42°42′N 27°15′E
- Country: Bulgaria
- Province (Oblast): Burgas

Government
  - Mayor: Slavcho Topalov

Area
  - City: 79.033 km^{2} (30.515 sq mi)
- Elevation: 95 m (312 ft)

Population (2021)
  - City: 18,974
  - Density: 240.08/km^{2} (621.80/sq mi)
  - Urban: 27,326
- Demonym: Aytossian
- Time zone: UTC+2 (EET)
  - Summer (DST): UTC+3 (EEST)
- Postal Code: 8500
- Area code: 558
- Website: Official website

Aytos (Bulgarian: Айтос [ˈajtos]), sometimes written Aitos and Ajtos, is a town located in eastern Bulgaria some 30 kilometers from the Bulgarian Black Sea Coast and belonging to the administrative boundaries of Burgas Province. It is the administrative centre of the homonymous Aytos Municipality. As of December 2021, the town has a population of 18,974 inhabitants. It lies in the Aytos Valley, the easternmost of the eleven Sub-Balkan valleys.

== History ==
Aytos has a rich and long history dating back to antiquity. Founded by Thracian tribes, archaeological finds near the town testify that its existence dates back to the 5th century BC. Throughout the centuries, the town has been known under different names including Aetòs (in Greek Αετός meaning eagle), Astòs (Αστός), Eidos (Είδος), Aquilia, Tchengis, etc.

During the reign of Khan Tervel, the region was incorporated in the Bulgarian Empire for the first time. The fortress Aetos took an important part in the defensive system of the Bulgarian lands against the sudden attacks of the Tatars, the Avars and the Crusaders.

In 1206, Aytos together with many cities in Bulgarian province of Thrace was destroyed by the Crusaders, led by Henry of Flanders. Henry of Flanders was a brother of Baldwin I, emperor of Latin Empire of Constantinople. A fortified city was rebuilt at 1488.

In 1378 the town was conquered by the armies of the Ottoman Empire under Murad I. During the Russian-Turkish War (1828–1829), General Hans Karl von Diebitsch turned the town into a strategic strong point. After the Treaty of Edirne in 1829, many of the town's citizens fled to Bessarabia to join the Bessarabian Bulgarians.

During the Bulgarian National Revival the population participated in the Bulgarian struggles for liberation. Vasil Levski organized a revolutionary committee in the town.

After the Liberation, Aytos became a commercial center, reputedly more important than Burgas. The first girls' agricultural school in the country was established in Aytos during the period.

== Transport ==
The geographic location determines the special significance of the municipality as a transport junction, where the road networks between Northern Bulgaria and Southern Bulgaria in this part of the country join. Important highways and the railway from Sofia to Burgas pass through it. Its good transport characteristics are also determined by the fact that it is only 28 km from Burgas, a key Black Sea port.

== Geography ==
The town is located in eastern Bulgaria some 30 kilometers from the Bulgarian Black Sea Coast and belonging to the administrative boundaries of Burgas Province. It is situated in the Aytos Valley, enclosed between the Balkan Mountains, the Hisar Heights and the Burgas Plain.

=== Climate ===
Climate data for Aytos, Bulgaria
Month	Jan	Feb	Mar	Apr	May	Jun	Jul	Aug	Sep	Oct	Nov	Dec	Year
Mean daily maximum °C (°F)	7.0 (44.6)	8.4 (47.1)	12.4 (54.3)	18.7 (65.7)	24.4 (75.9)	27.5 (81.5)	30.6 (87.1)	30.8 (87.4)	26.7 (80.1)	21.2 (70.2)	14.6 (58.3)	8.1 (46.6)	19.2 (66.6)
Daily mean °C (°F)	2.2 (36.0)	3.2 (37.8)	6.8 (44.2)	13.1 (55.6)	18.8 (65.8)	22.2 (72.0)	25.1 (77.2)	25.2 (77.4)	21.0 (69.8)	15.9 (60.6)	9.5 (49.1)	4.4 (39.9)	14.0 (57.2)
Mean daily minimum °C (°F)	−1.6 (29.1)	−1 (30)	2.1 (35.8)	7.4 (45.3)	12.1 (53.8)	15.4 (59.7)	18.1 (64.6)	18.0 (64.4)	14.2 (57.6)	9.5 (49.1)	5.3 (41.5)	0.8 (33.4)	8.4 (47.1)
Average rainfall mm (inches)	40 (1.6)	35 (1.4)	31 (1.2)	46 (1.8)	59 (2.3)	67 (2.6)	43 (1.7)	36 (1.4)	34 (1.3)	41 (1.6)	54 (2.1)	53 (2.1)	539 (21.2)
Source: Stringmeteo.com

== Culture ==
The town hosts the annual folk festival and competition Slaveevi Noshti, which takes place every Spring during the months of May and June. The festival is held at the "Slaveeva Reka" Recreational Park, and it celebrates traditional dance and folk music from across Bulgaria.

== Demography ==
The town of Aytos has 18,974 inhabitants as of December 2021. Most inhabitants are ethnic Bulgarians (68%), followed by large Turkish (17%) and Roma minorities (14%).

Ethnic groups in the town of Aytos (2011 census)
Ethnic group	Percentage
Bulgarians	68.4%
Turks	17.0%
Romani	13.5%
others and indefinable	1.1%

== Sports ==
Established in the early '50s, the famous Aytos Sports Academy “Vihar” has produced many national and international gymnastics champions, including three-time international champion Silviya Kostova. The Academy has a football team as well - "Vihar Aytos".

== Recreation and tourism ==
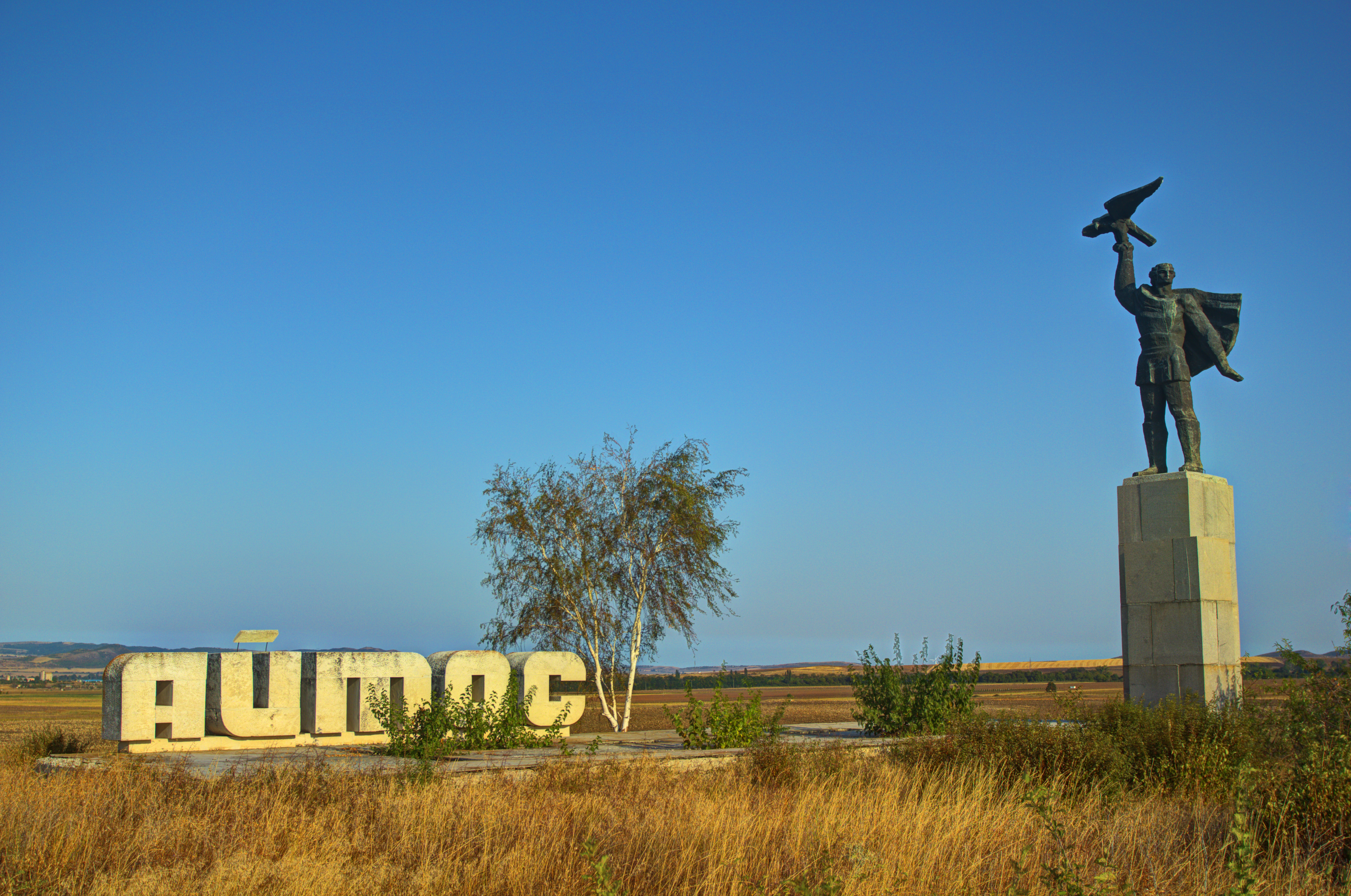
The eagle statue and city sign at the entrance to Aytos

=== Natural landmarks ===
- Recreation Park "Slaveeva Reka" ("Nightingale's River") — Few towns in Bulgaria can boast parks as big as "Slaveeva Reka" park. The park also hosts the Aytos Animal Zoo.
- Rock Formation "Trite Bratya" ("The Three Brothers")
- Natural Reserve "Kazanite"
- Natural Reserve "Hisarya"
- State Forest "Koriata"

==== Historical landmarks ====
- Ancient Fortress "Aetos"
- Aitoski Historical Pass — Connecting the ancient lands of Thrace and Moesia
- St. Dimitrii Solunski Orthodox Church
- Aitos Mineral Baths

==== Cultural landmarks ====
- Ethnographic Complex "Genger" — A small Etara-like ethnographic center built in the traditional local architectural style. The complex has a variety of different traditional Bulgarian arts and crafts shops as well as a traditional hotel, taverns, cafes and restaurants.
- Museum of "Peter Stanev"
- Theater "Vasil Levski"

== Notable people ==
- Ivan Angelov — Music Idol Star
- Ivan Hristov — former football player and manager
- Ivana (singer) — Singer
- Eva Kirilova — Singer from Tonika
- Filip Kutev — Composer and founder of the Bulgarian National Ensemble & Choir
- Zhivko Mutafchiev — Painter
- Vladimir Nenov — Filmmaker
- Panayot Panayotov — Singer
- Pencho Peev — Poet
- Marie George Pepper - Psychotherapist, Cambridge, England
- Georgi Popgeorgiev — Painter and founder of the Young Bulgarian Painters Society
- Petar Stanev — Painter
- Hristo Tanev — Sculptor
- Sava Tanev — Sculptor
- Yovi Tenev — Federal Prosecutor for the United States Department of Justice
- Tatyana Yotova — Poet
- Rositsa Zhivkova

== Honour ==
Aytos Point on Livingston Island in the South Shetland Islands, Antarctica is named for Aytos.
