= Slaveevi Noshti =

Slaveevi Noshti (Bulgarian: Славееви Hощи) or "Nightingales' Nights" in English, is an annual folk music and dance festival held in Aitos, Bulgaria. Each year the festival attracts individual performers, dance ensembles and folk choirs from all corners of Bulgaria. The mission of the festival is to preserve and popularize Bulgarian folk music, dance and culture as envisioned by the great Bulgarian composer and musician Filip Kutev, also native of Aitos. The festival was first held in 1968 and since then it has grown into a national competition.

The competition part of the festival has two dimensions: individual and group. All performers are divided into three age groups: below 14 years of age; 14–18 years of age; and over 18 years of age. The competition segments are as follows:

1. Traditional folk singing performance (individual/group)
2. Traditional music instrument performance (individual/group)
3. Traditional dance performance (individual/group)

== Notes ==
- "Славееви нощи” започват в Айтос - "Slaveevi Noshti" begin in Aitos, 06/06/06, Internet Media Big.bg
- Приз за млад изпълнител връчват на „Славееви нощи” в Айтос - Award for best young performer is given during "Slaveevi Noshti" in Aitos, 05/25/06, Burgas Info
- Традиционни фолклорни празници „СЛАВЕЕВИ НОЩИ” –АЙТОС 2007
- 38-то издание на „Славееви нощи” е едно от най-успешните - 38th "Slaveevi Nosthi" festival is the most successful, Aitos Municipality News
