= Mitre Zavalov =

Mitre Zavalov was a Bulgarian revolutionary, member of the Internal Macedonian-Adrianople Revolutionary Organization (IMARO), and a chetnik (guerrilla fighter) in the band of the vojvoda Efrem Chuchkov.

== Biography ==
Little is known about the personal life of Mitre Zavalov. Archival and local historical sources list him as originating from the village of Polyanovo in Eastern Thrace (today in Harmanli Municipality, Haskovo Province), a village inhabited predominantly by Eastern Orthodox Bulgarians.

At the turn of the 20th century, the region formed part of the Thracian plain and maintained a compact Bulgarian agrarian community, which became a significant recruitment base for the national liberation movement. It is within this environment that future IMARO fighters such as Zavalov emerged.

== Activity within IMARO ==
Zavalov is recorded as a member of the guerrilla band led by the vojvoda Efrem Chuchkov. Chuchkov was one of the leading figures of the organization, a close associate of Gotse Delchev and an active leader in the Adrianople Revolutionary District.

Zavalov appears in the archival Diary of the Bands Sent to Macedonia from the Kyustendil Point (1903–1908), which lists him as a rank-and-file guerrilla in Chuchkov's band. The document is a logistical register that records the composition, movement, and operational assignments of bands dispatched toward Macedonia and the Adrianople region during and after the Ilinden–Preobrazhenie Uprising.

No additional details about independent actions, leadership functions, or later political activity of Zavalov are provided in the surviving records. As such, he represents the large but sparsely documented group of "ordinary" IMARO fighters who formed the bulk of the organization's armed strength without achieving the prominence of commanders or district leaders.

== Legacy ==
Zavalov's name appears in contemporary local historical studies and digital encyclopedic entries about the village of Polyanovo, where he is listed as a “Bulgarian revolutionary of IMARO, guerrilla fighter under Efrem Chuchkov,” and one of the notable natives of the village.

The ongoing digitization of IMARO archival material—especially the publication of the “List of Bands and Guerrillas” from the State Archives – Vratsa—has contributed to the gradual reintroduction of lesser-known figures such as Mitre Zavalov into public historical memory.

== See also ==
- Internal Macedonian-Adrianople Revolutionary Organization
- Efrem Chuchkov
- Polyanovo, Haskovo Province
- Ilinden–Preobrazhenie Uprising
- Adrianople Revolutionary District
