= Topolitsa =

- Village
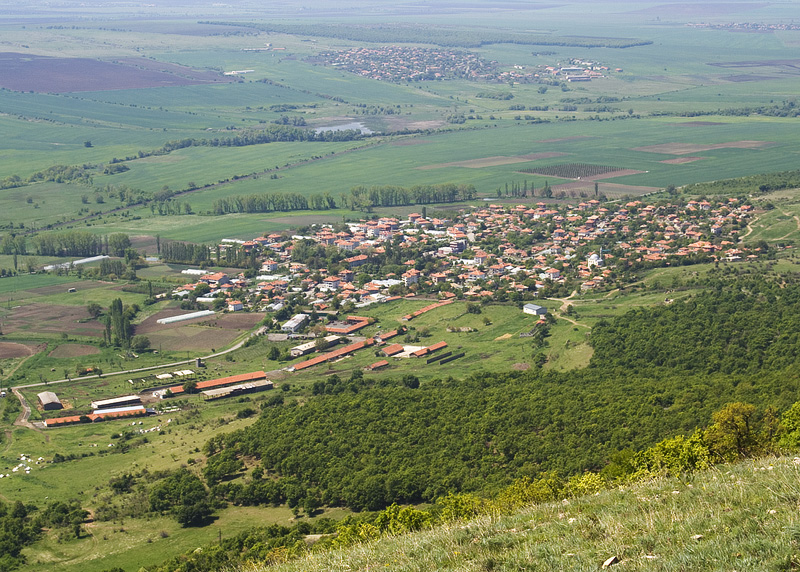
- Aerial view of Topolitsa

- Location within Bulgaria
- Coordinates: 42°44′N 27°07′E
- Country: Bulgaria
- Province: Burgas Province
- Municipality: Aytos Municipality

Population (2011)
  - Total: 979
- Time zone: UTC+2 (EET)
  - Summer (DST): UTC+3 (EEST)

Topolitsa is a village in Aytos Municipality, in Burgas Province, in southeastern Bulgaria. The village of Topolitsa has 979 inhabitants (in 2011). Almost two thirds are Turks, while a third is Pomak. All inhabitants are Muslim.
