= Sadievo, Burgas Province =

Sadievo
- Village
- Location within Bulgaria
- Coordinates: 42°40′02″N 27°19′13″E
- Country: Bulgaria
- Province: Burgas Province
- Municipality: Aytos Municipality
- Time zone: UTC+2 (EET)
  - Summer (DST): UTC+3 (EEST)

Sadievo is a village in Aytos Municipality, in Burgas Province, in southeastern Bulgaria.
