= John Bogas =

Byzantine general

John Bogas was a 10th-century Byzantine general. In 917, he was sent to the Pechenegs to form an alliance against Bulgaria during the War of 913–927. However, although he was able to bribe some of their tribal leaders, the Byzantine admiral Romanus Lecapenus did not manage to ferry them across the Danube. At the same time, the whole Byzantine army was destroyed in the battle of Achelous by the Bulgarians under Emperor Simeon I the Great. After their return to Constantinople, Bogas and Romanos were among the nobles who were blamed for the defeat.
