= Dryankovets =

- Village
- Location within Bulgaria
- Coordinates: 42°41′N 27°22′E
- Country: Bulgaria
- Province: Burgas Province
- Municipality: Aytos Municipality
- Time zone: UTC+2 (EET)
  - Summer (DST): UTC+3 (EEST)

Dryankovets is a village in the municipality of Aytos Municipality, in Burgas Province, in southeastern Bulgaria.
