= Kableshkovo, Pomorie Municipality =

Town in Burgas oblast, Bulgaria

Coordinates: 42°39′00″N 27°34′00″E

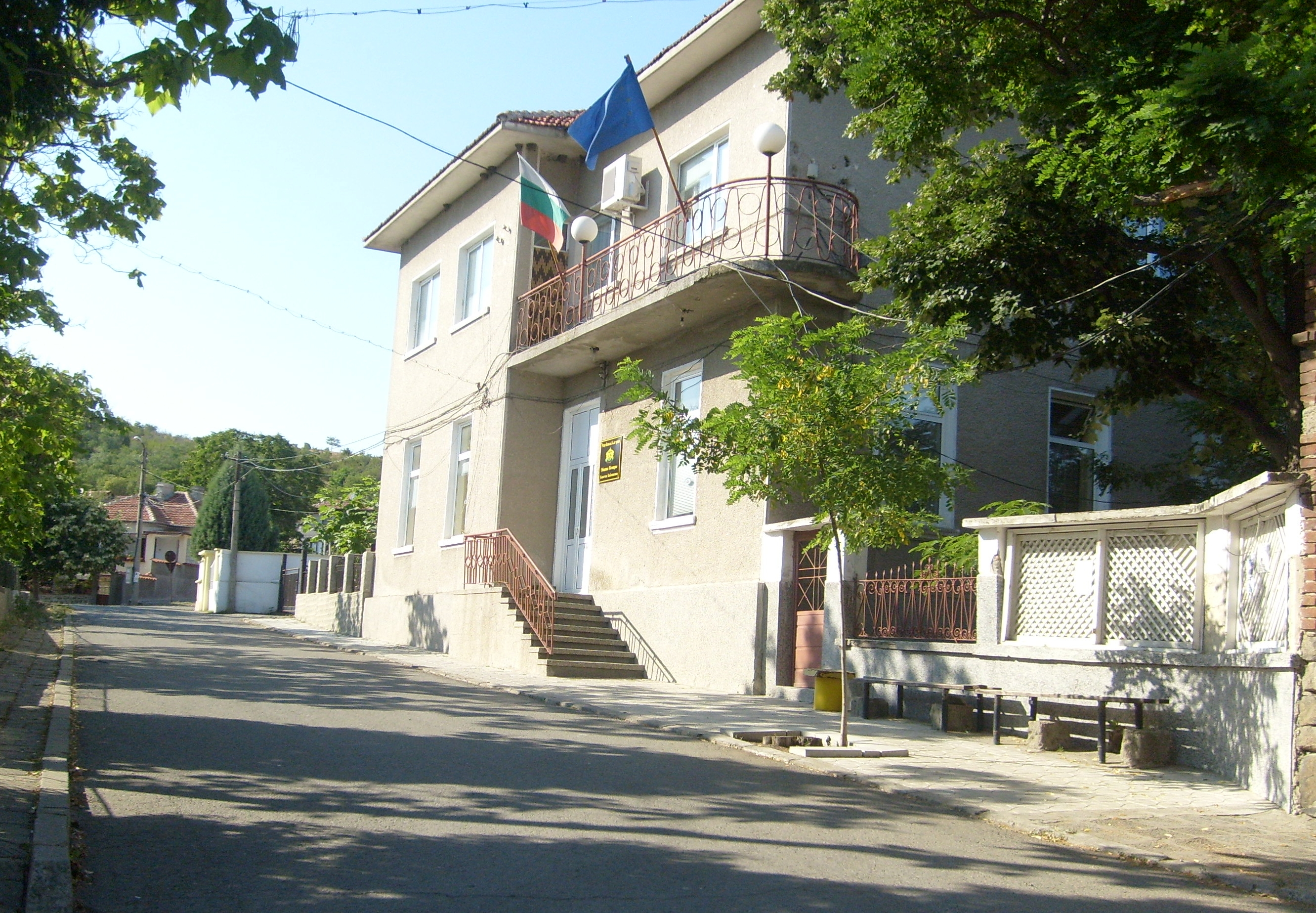
Kableshkovo.

Kableshkovo (Bulgarian: Каблешково [kɐbˈlɛʃkovo]) is a small town in the Pomorie Municipality, Bulgaria. As of 2005 the population was 2,866. A small but modern sports complex of PFC Naftex Burgas is under construction. It will include two football terrains and an attached hotel. A golf complex is also expected to be built in 2010, and is expected to be the biggest and most modern golf complex in the country.
