= Aheloy =

Town in Pomorie Municipality, Burgas Province, Bulgaria

Coordinates: 42°38′56″N 27°38′53″E

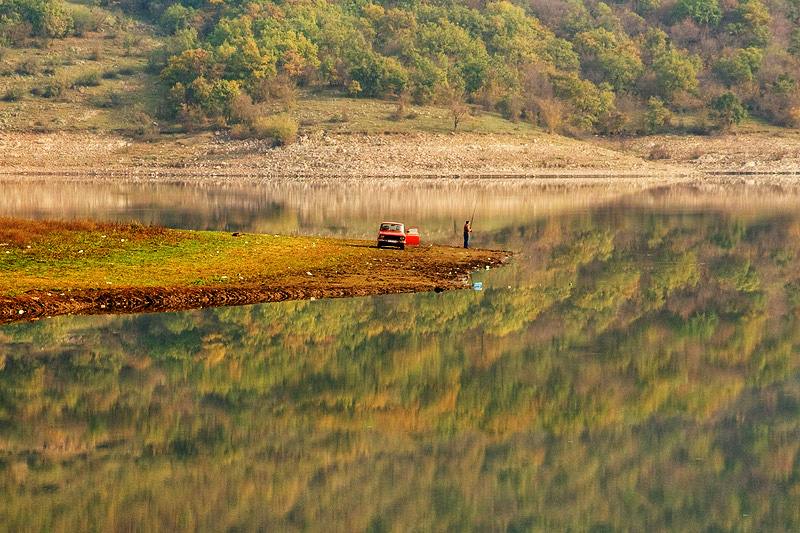
The Aheloy dam.

Aheloy (Bulgarian: Ахелой [axeˈɫoj]) is a town and seaside resort in Pomorie Municipality of Burgas Province. As of 2006 it had 2,175 inhabitants. It is situated in eastern Bulgaria, on the Black Sea Coast between the major port of Burgas to the south and the bustling tourist centres Nesebar, Slanchev Bryag, and Sveti Vlas to the north.

One of the bloodiest battles in the Middle Ages took place near the town in 917 when the Bulgarian Emperor Simeon I delivered a devastating blow to the Byzantine army. More than 90,000 men perished in the battle, 70,000 of whom were Byzantines. In the decades following the Battle of Anchialus the Bulgarian Empire entered a period of upheaval and relished a territorial extent, covering most of the Balkan peninsula.

The river Aheloy flows into the Black Sea south of the town.

Aheloy was officially proclaimed a town in 2009 with a decision by the Government of Bulgaria.

Aheloy Nunatak in Antarctica is named after the town.
