= Battle of Katasyrtai =

Battle between Byzantines and Bulgarians

- Part of the Byzantine–Bulgarian wars: War of 913–927
Date	Fall, 917
Location	Katasyrtai, near Constantinople 41.030556°N 28.890278°E
Result	Bulgarian victory

Belligerents
Bulgarian Empire	Byzantine Empire

Commanders and leaders
Simeon I of Bulgaria	Leo Phokas

Strength
Unknown	Unknown

Casualties and losses
Unknown	Heavy

The battle of Katasyrtai (Kατασυρται) occurred in the fall of 917, shortly after the striking Bulgarian triumph at Achelous near the village of the same name close to the Byzantine capital Constantinople, (now Istanbul). The result was a Bulgarian victory.

== Origins of the conflict ==
From the beginning of 917 both sides prepared for decisive actions. The Byzantines tried to forge a coalition against Bulgaria but their attempts failed due to the fast reaction of the Bulgarian ruler Simeon I. Nonetheless, the Byzantines gathered an enormous army, but they were decisively defeated at Achelous.

== Battle ==
While the victorious Bulgarian army was marching southwards, the Byzantine commander Leo Phokas, who survived at Achelous, reached Constantinople by sea and gathered the last Byzantine troops to intercept his enemy before reaching the capital. The two armies clashed near the village of Katasyrtai just outside the city and after a night fight, the Byzantines were completely routed from the battlefield.

== Aftermath ==
The last Byzantine military forces were literally destroyed and the way to Constantinople was opened, but the Serbs rebelled to the west and the Bulgarians decided to secure their rear before the final assault of the Byzantine capital which gave the enemy precious time to recover.
