= Battle of Achelous (917) =

Part of the Byzantine–Bulgarian wars

- Part of the Byzantine–Bulgarian wars and Byzantine–Bulgarian war of 913–927
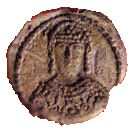
- Seal of Simeon I
Date	20 August 917
Location	Achelous river near Anchialus 42°38′35″N 27°38′12″E
Result	Bulgarian victory

Belligerents
Bulgarian Empire; Hungarians	Byzantine Empire

Commanders and leaders
Simeon I of Bulgaria	Leo Phokas

Strength
15,000	30,000

Casualties and losses
Unknown	Unknown (heavy)

The Battle of Achelous or Acheloos (Bulgarian: Битката при Ахелой, Greek: Μάχη του Αχελώου), also known as the Battle of Anchialus, took place on 20 August 917, on the Achelous river near the Bulgarian Black Sea coast, close to the fortress Tuthom (modern Pomorie) between Bulgarian and Byzantine forces. The Bulgarians obtained a decisive victory which not only secured the previous successes of Simeon I, but made him de facto ruler of the whole Balkan Peninsula, excluding the well-protected Byzantine capital Constantinople and the Peloponnese. The battle, which was one of the biggest and bloodiest battles of the European Middle Ages, was one of the worst disasters ever to befall a Byzantine army, and conversely one of the greatest military successes of Bulgaria. Among the most significant consequences was the official recognition of the imperial title of the Bulgarian monarchs, and the consequent affirmation of Bulgarian equality vis-à-vis Byzantium.

== Background ==
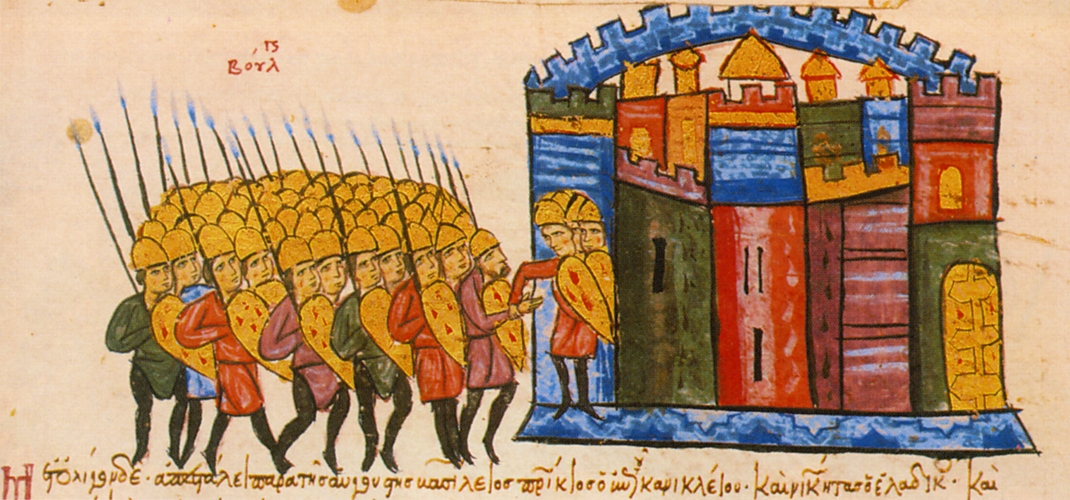
Bulgarian troops seizing Adrianople

After the Bulgarian victory in the war of 894–896, the Byzantines were forced to pay tribute to Tsar Simeon I of Bulgaria. In 912 when the Byzantine emperor Leo VI died, his brother Alexander refused to pay tribute to the Bulgarians. Simeon saw an opportunity to wage a new war and fulfil his ambitions to conquer Constantinople. Alexander died in the same year and the new government under the Patriarch Nicholas Mystikos made desperate attempts to avoid the war, promising that the infant Emperor Constantine VII would marry one of Simeon's daughters. At some point, the patriarch and Simeon even met outside the walls of Constantinople, performing a coronation ceremony. Thereafter, Simeon began using the title "Tsar of the Bulgarians", and the Greek title basileus in his seals.

After a plot in the Byzantine court in 914, however, the new regent Zoe, Constantine's mother, rejected the marriage. In answer the Bulgarians raided eastern Thrace. Adrianople opened its gates to Simeon in September 914, and its population recognised Simeon as their ruler, while the Byzantine army was occupied in the east. In the next year the Bulgarian armies attacked the areas of Dyrrhachium and Thessalonica.

== Preparations for battle ==
Both sides carefully prepared for a decisive end of the conflict. Empress Zoe wanted to swiftly make a peace settlement with the Arabs and to engage the whole army of the East in a war with Simeon and destroy him. The Byzantines tried to find allies and sent emissaries to the Magyars, Pechenegs and Serbs, but Simeon was familiar with the methods of Byzantine diplomacy and from the very beginning took successful actions to subvert a possible alliance between his enemies. Thus the Byzantines were forced to fight alone.

=== Byzantine army ===
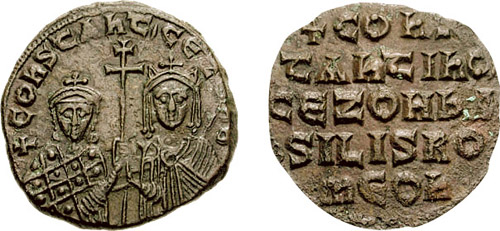
Zoe of Byzantium and her son, emperor Constantine VII

By 917, after a series of successful campaigns, the Byzantine Empire had stabilized its eastern borders, and the generals John Bogas and Leo Phocas were able to gather additional troops from Asia Minor to reinforce the imperial tagmata and the European thematic troops, gathering a force of some 60,000 men. This was a very large army by contemporary standards, and its goal was the elimination of the Bulgarian threat from the north. The Byzantine commanders were convinced that their strategy would be successful. Morale was raised as the soldiers vowed by the miraculous Cross to die for one another. The spirit of the army was further raised as the troops were paid in advance and a fleet commanded by Romanus Lecapenus set off to the north at the mouth of the Danube. The Byzantines had tried to pay some Pecheneg tribes to attack, but Romanus would not agree to transport them across the Danube, and instead, they attacked Bulgarian territory on their own.

=== Bulgarian army ===
The size of the Bulgarian army under Simeon I of Bulgaria is unknown. Although they ruined the Byzantine negotiations, the Bulgarians were still afraid that the old allies of the Byzantines, the Pechenegs and the Hungarians, would attack them from the north, so two small armies were sent to protect the northern borders of the vast Bulgarian Empire that spread from Bosnia in the west to the Dnieper River in the east.

Miracula Sancti Georgii, written in the 11th century and in this particular case of dubious veracity, is the only source which points that the Bulgarian army in the battle of Achelous was allied with Hungarian and Pecheneg troops, which helped to win the victory against the Byzantine army. Based on this, several historians accepted the involvement of Hungarian and Pechenegs troops, including Ivan Duichev, Gyula Kristó and Ferenc Makk. Kristó even interpreted the Hungarians' participation as the "first, unmistakable sign of the decline of the Hungarian nomadic state is that from 917 onwards in the same year in two directions [i.e. west and east], the Hungarians went on raids, that is, the central control [...] began to disappear". However, contemporary sources – including a letter from Nicholas Mystikos – contradicts the chronicle's narration. Until the 930s, the Hungarians in fact were regarded as strong allies of the Byzantine Empire. In addition, Bulgarian forces under Marmais were deployed near the western borders with the Serb principalities to prevent possible unrest.

== Battle ==
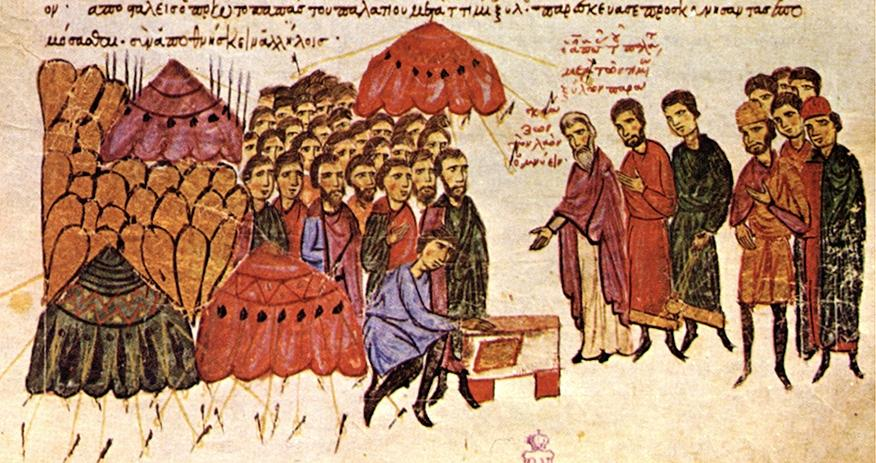
The oath of the Byzantine soldiers on the eve of the battle

The Byzantine army marched northwards and set its camp in the vicinity of the strong fortress of Anchialus. Leo Phocas intended to invade Moesia and meet the Pechenegs and Lecapenus's troops in Dobrudzha. Simeon swiftly concentrated his army on the heights around the fortress.

On the morning of 20 August, the battle between the Bulgarians and the Byzantines began by the River Achelous near the modern village Acheloi, 8 kilometers to the north of Anchialus (modern Pomorie) on Bulgaria's Black Sea coast. The Byzantine generals planned to outflank the Bulgarian right wing in order to detach Simeon's troops from the Balkan Passes. The Bulgarian ruler concentrated his most powerful forces in the two wings and left the centre relatively weak in order to surround the enemy when the centre would yield to the Byzantine attack. Simeon himself was in charge of large cavalry reserves hidden behind the hills which were intended to strike the decisive blow.

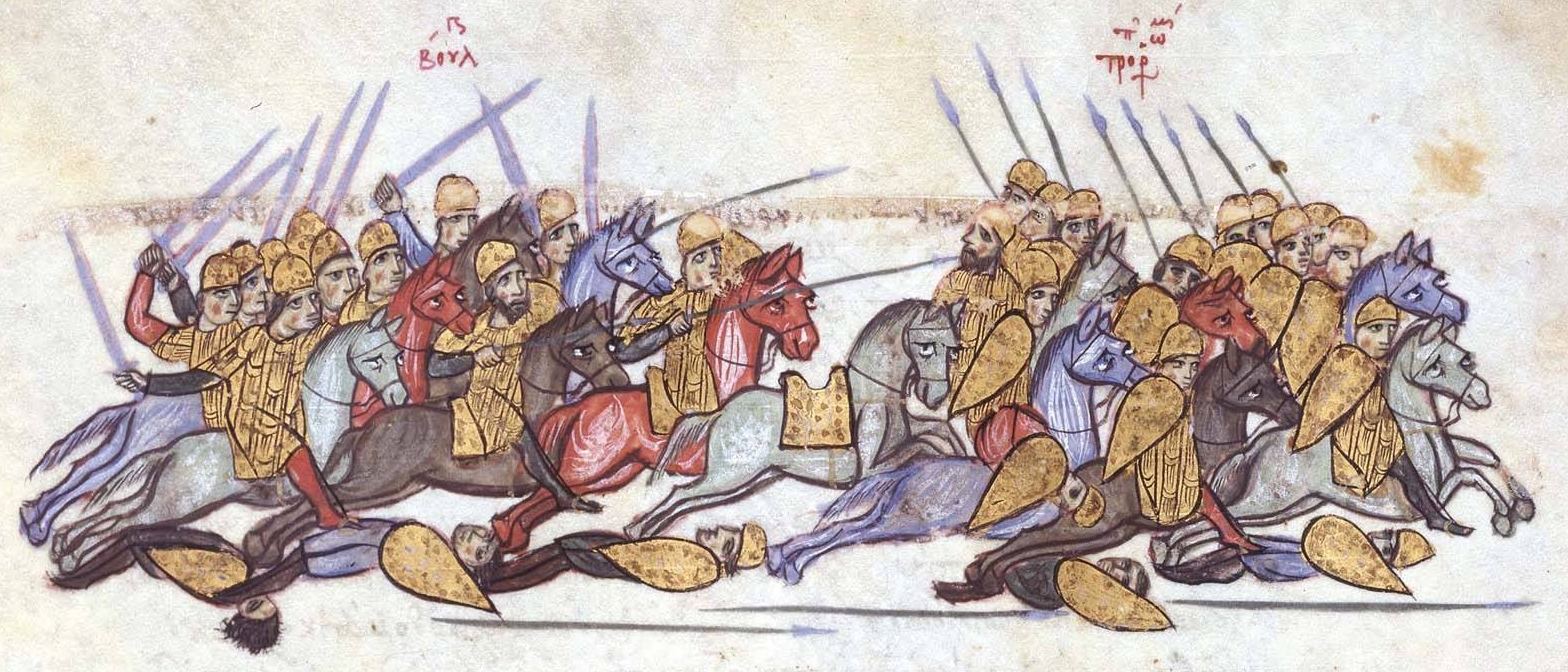
The Bulgarian victory at Anchialus

The Byzantine attack was fierce and it was not long before the Bulgarians began slowly to retreat. The Byzantine cavalry charged the infantry in the centre killing many Bulgarians. The Bulgarian position became desperate as they could not manage to hold the heights to the south of the river and began a hasty retreat to the north. Elated, the Byzantines started a bitter chase and their battle formations soon began to break, especially as a rumour spread that the Byzantine commander, Leo Phocas, had been killed. At this point, Simeon, who had detected the disarray in the Byzantine formation, ordered his army to stand, and, at the head of his heavy cavalry corps, attacked the Byzantine left wing from behind the hills. With an irresistible onslaught the cavalry bore down at the confused enemy who immediately bent under their attack, panicked, and took to their heels.

...And even now there could be seen piles of bones at Anchialus, where the fleeing army of the Romans was disgracefully slain.

— from Leo the Deacon's History, 75 years later

Some Byzantines tried to repulse the cavalry charge but they were also attacked by the infantry. Tsar Simeon personally took part in the fight, his white horse killed at the height of the battle. The Byzantines were completely routed. Leo Phocas was saved by fleeing to Mesembria (modern Nesebar) in Bulgaria, but in the thick of the battle Constantine Lips, John Grapson, and many other commanders (archontes) were cut down along with an enormous number of soldiers and officers. By the end of the day the Bulgarians overwhelmed the defenders of Mesembria and captured the town. Leo Phocas barely escaped by boarding a ship.

The Byzantine historian Leo the Deacon says that 75 years after this military catastrophe the field at Anchialus was still covered with tens of thousands of Roman skeletons. The battle was among the bloodiest of medieval history and some historians refer to it as "the battle of the century".

== Aftermath ==
Progress of the Battle of Acheloos.

The remainder of the Byzantine army fled all the way back to Constantinople, followed by the Bulgarians. Several days later Phokas was defeated once more at Katasyrtai where the last Byzantine troops were routed after a night fight. The way to Constantinople was clear. The Byzantines proposed a new peace treaty, and Simeon entered the imperial city and was crowned for a second time as "Tsar" (the Slavonic title for Caesar i.e. Emperor) "of all Bulgarians and Romans". Simeon also demanded that his daughter would marry Constantine VII, the son of empress Zoe Karvounopsina, but Zoe refused and allied with Serbia and Hungary against him. However, in August 918, general Romanus Lecapenus engineered a coup to depose Zoe and confined her to the monastery of St Euphemia-in-Petrium, allowing him to assume the purple. The alliance with the Serbs postponed the decisive assault of Constantinople. Due to his also heavy casualties, Simeon decided to secure his rear and sent an army from his remaining forces under Marmais and Theodore Sigritsa to destroy them. His generals captured the Serb prince but that gave the Byzantines precious time to recover due to his already diminished forces, making him have no sufficient forces to fight on both sides at the same time.

== Significance ==
The Battle of Achelous was one of the most important battles in the long Byzantine–Bulgarian Wars. It secured the concession of the Imperial title to the Bulgarian rulers, and thereby firmly established Bulgaria's role as a key player in Europe. However, the dynastic marriage that Simeon desired to establish with the Byzantine imperial family was foiled. After his death in 927, however, his successor Peter I was able to secure the hand of Maria Lecapene, the granddaughter of Emperor Romanus I, and with it an annual tribute, the renewed recognition of his imperial title and the autocephaly of the Bulgarian church. This agreement ushered an unprecedented period of 40 years of peaceful relations between the two powers, a time of stability and prosperity for Bulgaria.

== Sources ==
- Атанас Пейчев и колектив, 1300 години на стража, Военно издателство, София 1984.
- Васил Н. Златарски, История на българската държава през средните векове, Част I, II изд., Наука и изкуство, София 1970.
- Bakalov, Georgi (2003). Том 5 от История на българите: Военна история на българите от древността до наши дни. TRUD Publishers. ISBN 978-954-621-235-1.
- Haldon, John (1999). Warfare, State and Society in the Byzantine World, 565–1204. London: UCL Press. ISBN 1-85728-495-X.
- Haldon, John (2008). The Byzantine Wars. The History Press.
- Hupchick, Dennis (2017). The Bulgarian-Byzantine Wars For Early Medieval Balkan Hegemony: Silver-Lined Skulls and Blinded Armies. Wilkes-Barre, PA, US: Palgrave Macmillan. ISBN 978-3-319-56205-6.
- John Skylitzes, Synopsis Historion, translated by Paul Stephenson.
- Theophanes Continuatus, ed. Bekker, pp. 388–390.
- Йордан Андреев, Милчо Лалков, Българските ханове и царе, Велико Търново, 1996.
- Stephenson, Paul (2004). Byzantium's Balkan Frontier: A Political Study of the Northern Balkans, 900–1204. Cambridge University Press. ISBN 0-511-03402-4.
