= Aleksandrovo, Merošina =

Aleksandrovo Александрово
- Village
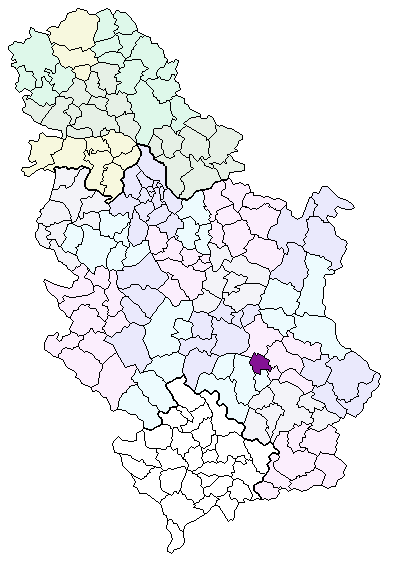
- Location of Merošina municipality in Serbia

- Location within Serbia
- Country: Serbia
- District: Nišava
- Municipality: Merošina

Population (2002)
  - Total: 393
- Time zone: UTC+1 (CET)
  - Summer (DST): UTC+2 (CEST)

Aleksandrovo is a village in Serbia in the municipality Merošina in Nisava district. According to the census of 2002, there were 393 people (according to the census of 1991, there were 361 inhabitants).

== Demographics ==
In the village of Alexander live 321 adult inhabitants, and the average age is 43.2 years (42.4 for men and 44.0 for women). The village has 127 households, and the average number of members per household is 3.09.
