= Aleksandrovo, Subotica =

Neighbourhood of Subotica, Serbia

Coordinates: 46°04′13″N 19°41′02″E

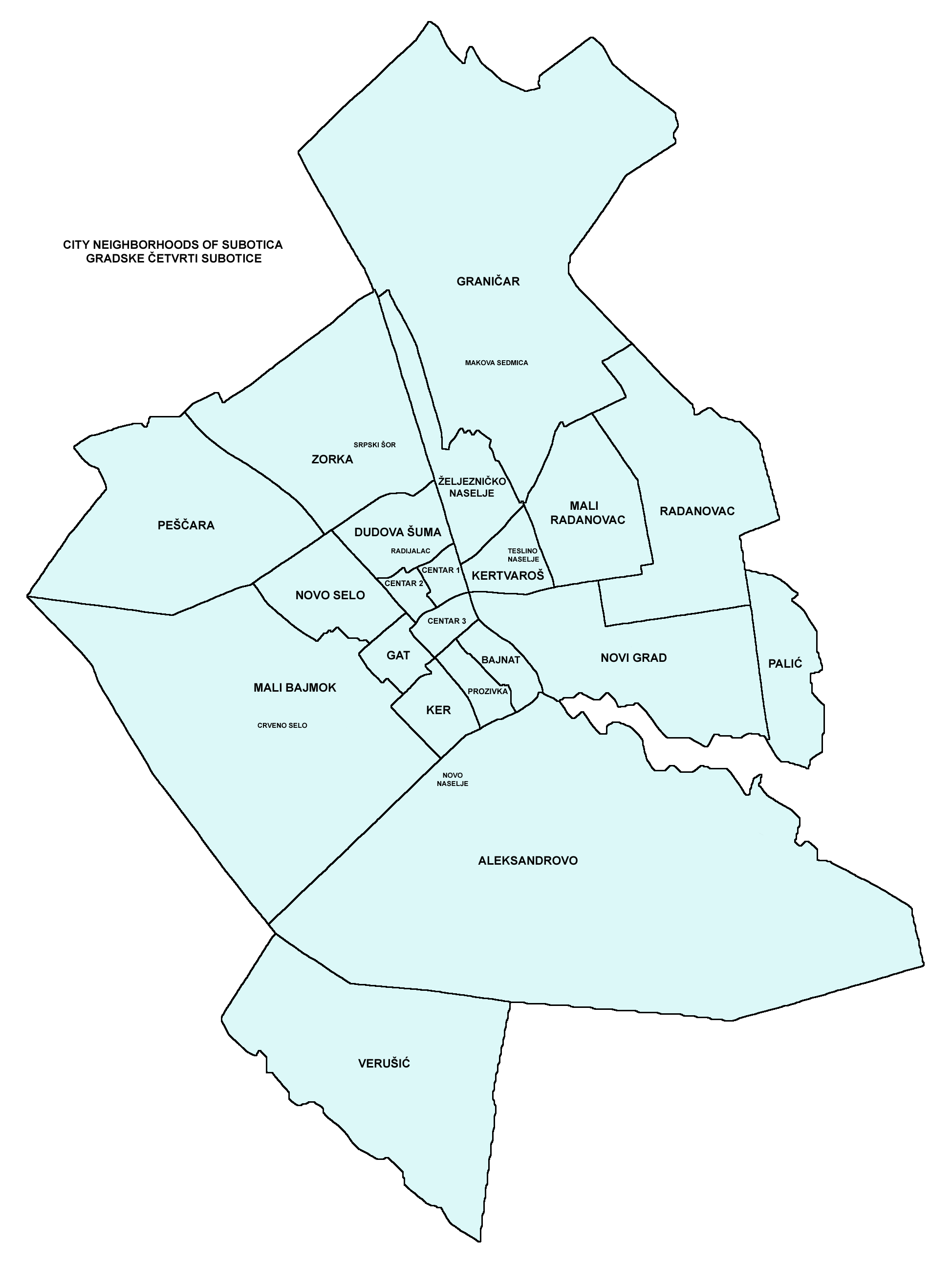
Neighborhoods in urban Subotica

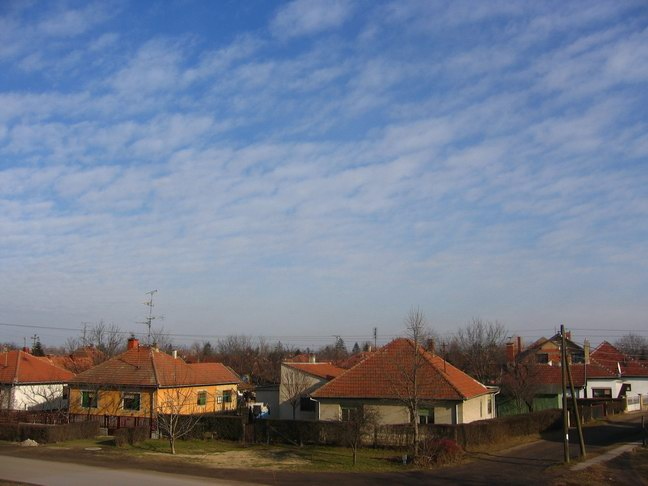
Aleksandrovo

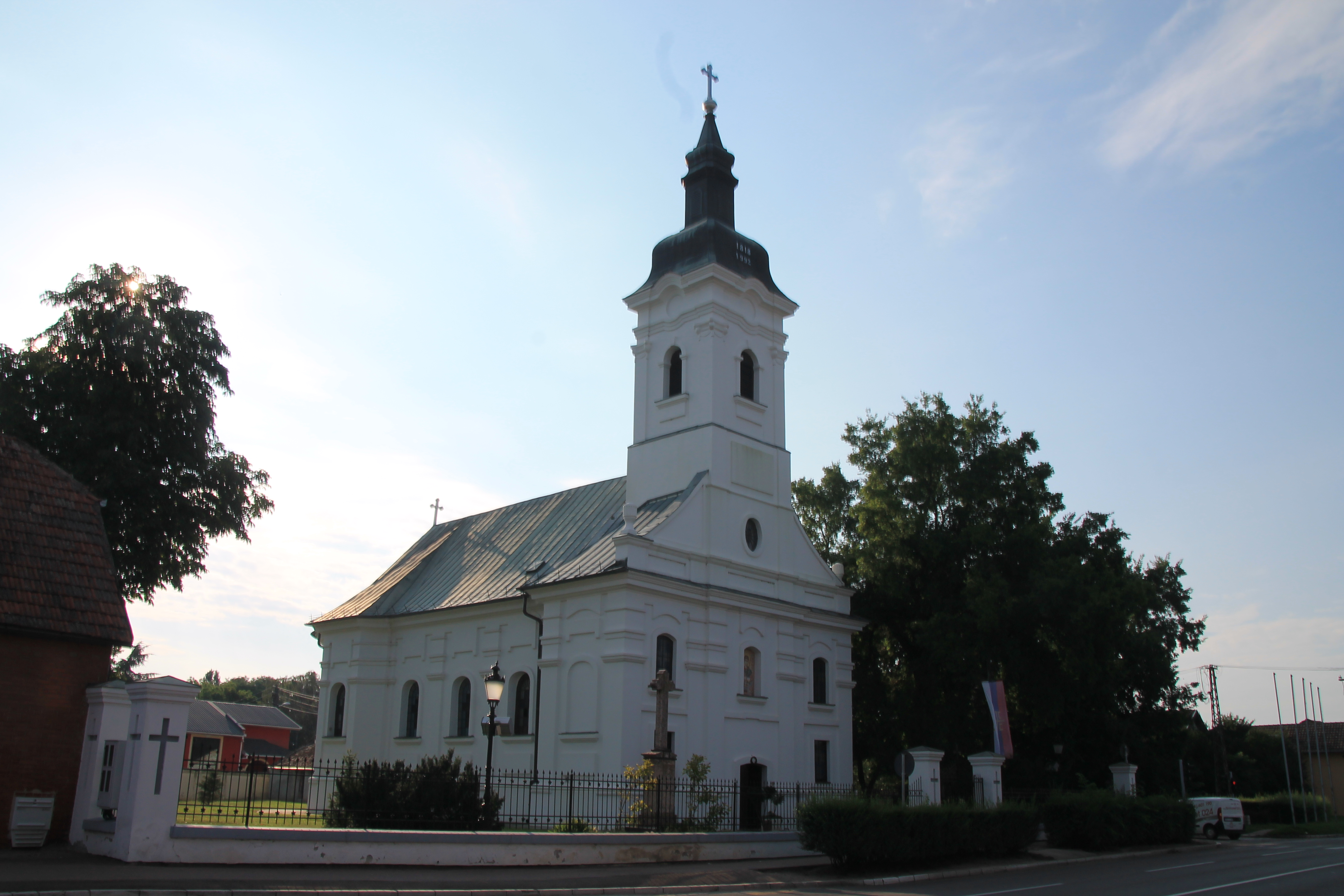
St Dimitrije Serbian Orthodox Church

Aleksandrovo (Serbian Cyrillic: Александрово) is a neighborhood of Subotica, Serbia.

== Name ==
It is most commonly known as Aleksandrovo (Александрово) or Šandor (Шандор), but it is also known as Novo Naselje (Ново Насеље).

The Serbian name is Александрово (Cyrillic) or Aleksandrovo (Latin). Croats and Bunjevci call this part of Subotica Šandor, and the inhabitant of Šandor is called Šandorčanin.
In Hungarian, this part of Subotica is called Sándor.
In German sources this village was called Schandor.

== History ==
There are traces of older settlements at this location dating from Bronze Age, time of the Sarmatians and Middle Ages. Aleksandrovo was founded in the 18th century or more exactly in 1786 by Serbs from Subotica. In 1804, Aleksandrovo was officially proclaimed a village. In this time, most of its inhabitants were Serbs, while some Croats (from the group of Bunjevci) lived there as well. Aleksandrovo was a separate municipality for one century until it was joined to Subotica (in 1904). The Serbian Orthodox church of St Dimitrije was built in Aleksandrovo in 1818.

== Economy ==
Aleksandrovo is home of several big companies, including Bratstvo (steel manufacturing), Subotička Mlekara (milk products), Fidelinka (grain and bread) and 29. Novembar (meat production).

== Sports ==
There is a wrestling club named "Aleksandrovo" in the neighborhood.
