= Polyanovo, Burgas Province =

Polyanovo
- Village
- Location in Bulgaria
- Coordinates: 42.715°N 27.177°E
- Country: Bulgaria
- Province: Burgas Province
- Municipality: Aytos Municipality

Population (2011)
  - Total: 393
- Time zone: UTC+2 (EET)
  - Summer (DST): UTC+3 (EEST)

Polyanovo is a village in Aytos Municipality, in Burgas Province, in southeastern Bulgaria.

== Population ==
The village has 393 inhabitants. Most inhabitants are ethnic Turks (95%).
