= Melka (surname) =

Melka is a surname. Notable people with the surname include:

- Antonín Melka (born 1990), Czech ice hockey player
- Elias Melka (1977–2019), Ethiopian record producer and songwriter
- James Melka (born 1962), American football player
- Michael Melka (born 1978), German footballer
- Philippe Melka, French-American winemaker
