= Polyanovo, Haskovo Province =

Polyanovo Поляново
- Village
- Location in Bulgaria
- Coordinates: 41°58′10″N 25°49′20″E
- Country: Bulgaria
- Province: Haskovo Province
- Municipality: Harmanli

Area
  - Total: 35.75 km^{2} (13.80 sq mi)
- Elevation: 146 m (479 ft)

Population (2021)
  - Total: 269
  - Density: 7.52/km^{2} (19.5/sq mi)
- Time zone: UTC+2 (EET)
  - Summer (DST): UTC+3 (EEST)
- Postal code: 6464
- Area code: 03764

Polyanovo is a village in the municipality of Harmanli, in Haskovo Province, in southern Bulgaria. It is located in the historical region of Eastern Thrace, in the Upper Thracian Plain, near the river Maritsa and the northern foothills of the Sakar mountain range. According to the 2021 census the village has 269 inhabitants; local administrative data from 2024 put the number of residents at around 320.

== History ==
During the Ottoman period the village was known under the name Ovajik (Bulgarian: Оваджик), more precisely Bulgarian Ovajik (Българско Оваджик), in order to distinguish it from nearby villages with mixed populations. In 1906 the village officially received the name Polyanovo as part of a nationwide campaign to replace Ottoman toponyms in Bulgaria.

The name Polyanovo is derived from the Bulgarian word „поле“ (pole, “field”) and reflects the flat character of the landscape in which the village is situated. By evoking the open, fertile plains of the Upper Thracian Lowland, the name underscores both the agricultural profile and the geographic setting of the settlement.

In the mid‑20th century Polyanovo was a prosperous village with strong agriculture and more than 1,700 inhabitants, according to the 1946 population census. In the following decades the village experienced a sharp demographic decline, typical of many Bulgarian rural settlements, as a result of migration to the cities and decreasing birth rates. By the beginning of the 21st century the population of Polyanovo had fallen below 300 inhabitants.

== Geography and climate ==
Polyanovo lies at an elevation of about 146 m in the Upper Thracian Plain, close to the river Maritsa and the southern slopes of the Sakar mountain range.

The area has a transitional continental climate with a marked Mediterranean influence; according to the Köppen classification it falls within the humid subtropical climate zone (Cfa). Summers are hot and dry: the average maximum temperatures in July and August reach about 32–33 °C, while precipitation in this period is low, around 24 mm in August.

Winters are relatively mild for inland Bulgaria. The mean January temperature is around 1 °C, with typical daytime highs of 6–7 °C and nighttime minima of about −2 to −3 °C. Snowfall is infrequent and usually short‑lived. The heaviest precipitation occurs in spring and early summer: May and June are the wettest months, with totals exceeding 130 mm, which favours the development of agricultural crops.

== Soils and agriculture ==
The lands around Polyanovo belong to the belt of cinnamonic forest soils (Bulgarian: канелено‑горски почви), characteristic of the southern parts of the Upper Thracian Plain. These soils are relatively fertile, well‑aerated and rich in humus, making them suitable for a wide range of crops under rainfed (non‑irrigated) agriculture.

The region has a strongly pronounced agricultural profile. Traditionally, cereals such as wheat, barley and maize are grown, together with sunflower and orchards of peaches, apricots and plums.

Polyanovo is situated near the Sakar wine zone, where the climate and soils are favourable for viticulture and for wine grape varieties such as Cabernet Sauvignon, Merlot and local white cultivars. Small boutique wineries operate in the wider area, particularly in neighbouring villages such as Kolarovo and Oreshets.

The relief around the village is predominantly flat, which facilitates mechanisation and large‑scale cultivation of land. The comparatively long growing season allows the production of vegetables, melons and industrial crops. Agriculture relies mainly on natural precipitation; irrigation is limited to small private plots.

== Demographics and culture ==
The population of Polyanovo consists predominantly of ethnic Bulgarians who follow Eastern Orthodox Christianity.

In 2021 the village had 269 inhabitants; according to local administrative data, around 320 people lived there in 2024. The age structure is strongly skewed towards older residents: more than 40% of the population is aged 65 or over, while children under 15 years form less than 12% of the inhabitants. As a result, educational and health infrastructure in the village is limited – there is no school, and medical services are used in the municipal centre.

Residents commonly travel to Harmanli, about 8 km away, for education, healthcare, shopping and other services. Polyanovo has a village mayor’s office (kmetstvo), which functions as the local administrative centre.

== Economy and infrastructure ==
The economy of Polyanovo is dominated by agriculture, chiefly cereal production and fruit growing. Part of the population is engaged in seasonal agricultural work, while others commute to jobs in the nearby town of Harmanli. There are no industrial enterprises in the village.

The road infrastructure is relatively well maintained: Polyanovo is connected to the municipal centre by an asphalt road that links it with the regional road network. In the village there is a mayor’s office, a postal branch and a small grocery shop. Internet access and mobile phone coverage are provided by national operators, but there is no permanent healthcare facility; residents use medical services in Harmanli.

== Community life ==
Community life in Polyanovo centres on family and religious celebrations and, when active, on the local community cultural centre (chitalishte). Village festivities are organised for holidays such as Saint George's Day (Gergyovden) and Saint Elijah's Day (Ilinden), as well as fairs linked to the agricultural calendar.

Despite the small population, the village maintains traditions of mutual assistance and communal life, especially among older residents. Some events are organised jointly with neighbouring villages. In national and local elections, inhabitants vote at the village polling station, while news and public notices are spread through the notice board at the mayor’s office or by word of mouth.

== Notable people ==
- Mitre Zavalov, Bulgarian revolutionary of the Internal Macedonian-Adrianople Revolutionary Organization (IMARO), member of the cheta of Efrem Chuchkov.
