= Ivan Angelov =

Bulgarian swimmer (born 1979)

Personal information
- Full name: Ivan Angelov
- National team: Bulgaria
- Born: 21 January 1979 (age 47) Vratsa, Bulgaria
- Height: 1.91 m (6 ft 3 in)
- Weight: 85 kg (187 lb)

Sport
- Sport: Swimming
- Strokes: Backstroke
- Club: Liulin Sofia
- Coach: Valentin Yordanov

Ivan Angelov (Bulgarian: Иван Ангелов; born 21 January 1979) is a Bulgarian former swimmer, who specialized in backstroke events. He is a single-time Olympian (2000), and a former Bulgarian record holder in 50, 100, and 200 m backstroke. During his sporting career, Angelov also trained for Liulin Sports Club in Sofia under his personal coaches Valentin Yordanov and Liliana Hristeva.

Angelov competed in a backstroke double at the 2000 Summer Olympics in Sydney. He posted FINA B-standards of 57.98 (100 m backstroke) and 2:06.48 (200 m backstroke) from the Croatian Open Championships in Dubrovnik. On the second day of the Games, Angelov placed thirty-ninth in the 100 m backstroke. Swimming in heat three, he held off Yugoslavia's Milorad Čavić to earn a sixth spot by 0.22 of a second in 58.03. Three days later, in the 200 m backstroke, Angelov challenged five other swimmers in heat one, including Hong Kong's Alex Fong, who later became one of the nation's popular singers. He came up short in third place and fortieth overall at 2:07.30, more than half a second (0.50) off his entry time.
