= Draganovo, Burgas Province =

Village in Burgas, Bulgaria

Draganovo Драганово
- Village
- Location within Bulgaria
- Coordinates: 42°41′50″N 27°26′25″E
- Country: Bulgaria
- Province: Burgas Province
- Municipality: Burgas Municipality

Population (2022)
  - Total: 437
- Time zone: UTC+2 (EET)
  - Summer (DST): UTC+3 (EEST)

Draganovo (Bulgarian: Драганово) is a village in Burgas Municipality, in Burgas Province, in southeastern Bulgaria.

== Demographics ==
According to 2011 Bulgarian census, the village had Turkish majority.

Ethnicity	People count
Bulgarians	10
Turks	422
Romanians	-
Others	-
Prefer not to answer	-
Not stated	-
Total	433

According to the 2022 census the village has 437 people.
