= Belodol =

- Village
- Location within Bulgaria
- Coordinates: 42°43′N 27°27′E
- Country: Bulgaria
- Province: Burgas Province
- Municipality: Pomorie
- Time zone: UTC+2 (EET)
  - Summer (DST): UTC+3 (EEST)

Belodol is a village in the municipality of Pomorie, in Burgas Province, in southeastern Bulgaria. As of 2013, it had a population of 460.
