= Aleksandrovo, Burgas Province =

- Village
- Location within Bulgaria
- Coordinates: 42°42′N 27°36′E
- Country: Bulgaria
- Province: Burgas Province
- Municipality: Pomorie
- Time zone: UTC+2 (EET)
  - Summer (DST): UTC+3 (EEST)

Aleksandrovo, Burgas Province is a village in the municipality of Pomorie, in Burgas Province, in southeastern Bulgaria.
