= Marmais =

Marmais (Bulgarian: Мармаис; died 924) was a Bulgarian military commander, nobleman and komita (duke) of a western Bulgarian region (Sredets or Macedonia) during the reign of Emperor Simeon I (893–927). He was a descendant of an ancient Bulgar family. He participated actively in the Byzantine–Bulgarian war of 913–927 but he is better known for his interference and campaigns against the Principality of Serbia.

In 917 the Serb prince Petar Gojniković, who was an ally of the Bulgarian Emperor openly changed sides and supported the Byzantines. This danger from the rear played a significant role for the delay of the advance towards Constantinople after the striking victory at Anchialus. In the fall of that year Simeon sent a punitive expedition force against the Serbs, led by Theodore Sigritsa and Marmais. They convinced Petar Gojniković to meet them, captured him and sent him to Preslav. They appointed Peter's cousin Pavle Branović the succeeding ruler of Serbia, but three years later Pavle also betrayed his alliance with Bulgaria. Marmais changed him with Zaharije Pribisavljević but he also started hostile actions against Bulgaria in 924. Marmais and Sigritsa lead a small army against Zaharije but they were ambushed and defeated, and their heads were later sent to the Byzantines.

The death of Marmais caused a major campaign against the Serbian principality which was defeated and annexed.

== Honours ==
Marmais Point on Trinity Peninsula, Antarctica is named after him.

== Sources ==
- Божилов, Ив. Цар Симеон Велики, с. 126,142
