= Theodore Sigritsa =

Bulgarian military commander and noble

Theodore Sigritsa (Bulgarian: Теодор Сигрица) or Sigritzes (died 924) was a Bulgarian military commander and noble, kavkhan (first minister) of Emperor Simeon I (r. 893–927).

In 895 he headed a delegation in Constantinople for exchange of prisoners and captives between Bulgaria and Byzantium during the Byzantine–Bulgarian war of 894–896. In the first year of the Byzantine–Bulgarian war of 913–927 Theodore worked out the prearrangement for peace after arduous and prolonged negotiations, which included the coronation of Simeon as Emperor of the Bulgarians. He participated in a successful campaign against the Principality of Serbia in 917, but in 924 he and Marmais, leading a small army, were ambushed by the Serbs and killed. Their deaths were followed by the Bulgarian annexation in the same year.
