= Aytos Municipality =

Coordinates: 42.7000°N 27.2500°E

Aytos Municipality Община Айтос
- Municipality (Obshtina)
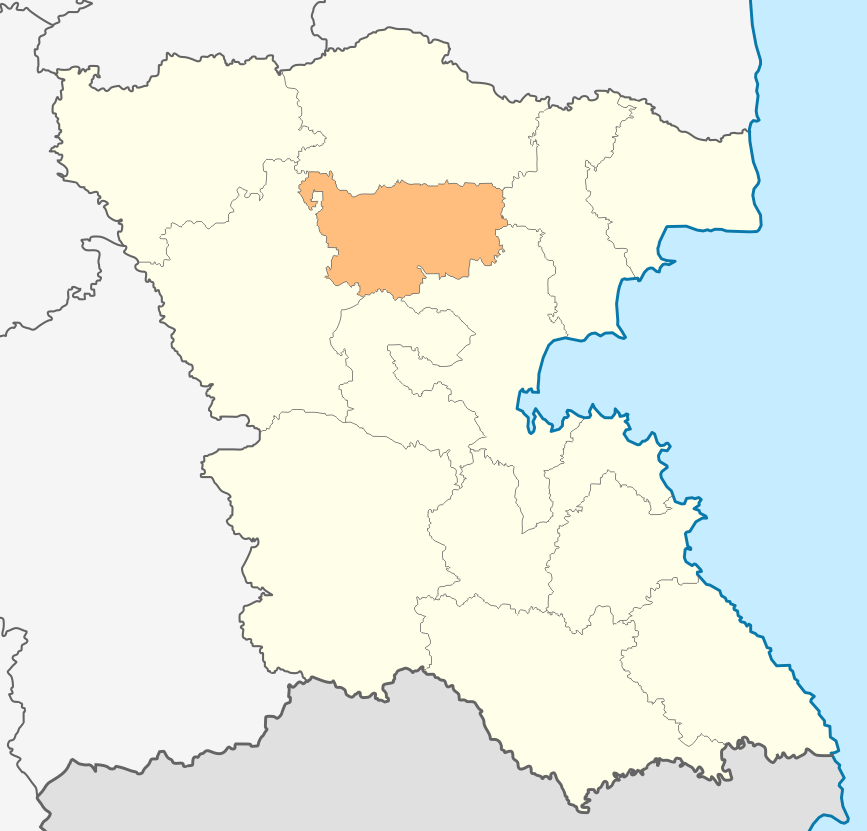
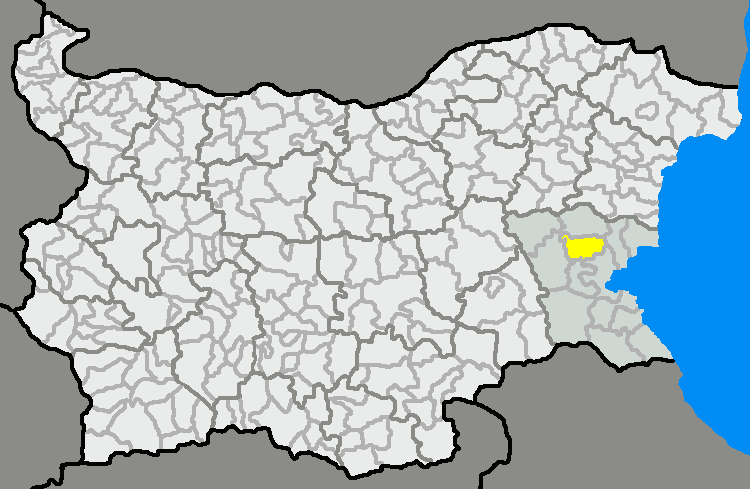
- Location in Burgas province Location on map of Bulgaria
- Country: Bulgaria
- Province (Oblast): Burgas
- Seat: Aytos

Area
  - Total: 488.61 km^{2} (188.65 sq mi)

Population (2011)
  - Total: 28,687
  - Density: 58.711/km^{2} (152.06/sq mi)
- Time zone: UTC+2 (EET)
  - Summer (DST): UTC+3 (EEST)
- Website: www.aitos.org

Aytos Municipality (Bulgarian: Община Айтос, Obshtina Aytos) is a municipality in Burgas Province, Bulgaria. It includes the town of Aytos and 16 villages.

== Religion ==
According to the latest Bulgarian census of 2011, the religious composition, among those who answered the optional question on religious identification, was the following:

Religious composition of Aytos Municipality
Orthodox Christianity	48.4%
Catholicism	0.4%
Protestantism	0.7%
Islam	38.1%
No religion	4.6%
Prefer not to answer, others and indefinable	7.8%

== Gallery ==
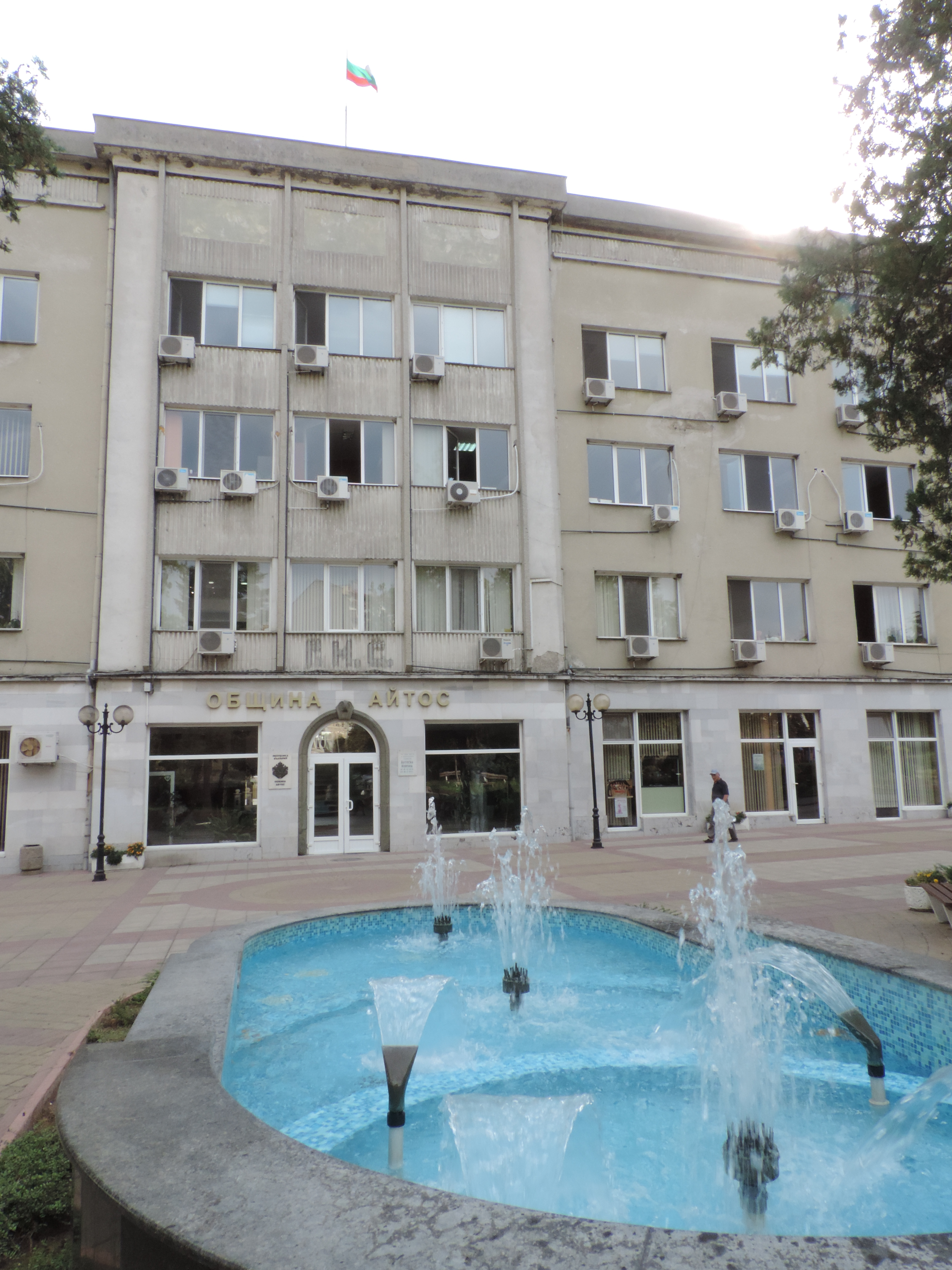
The building of Aytos Municipality

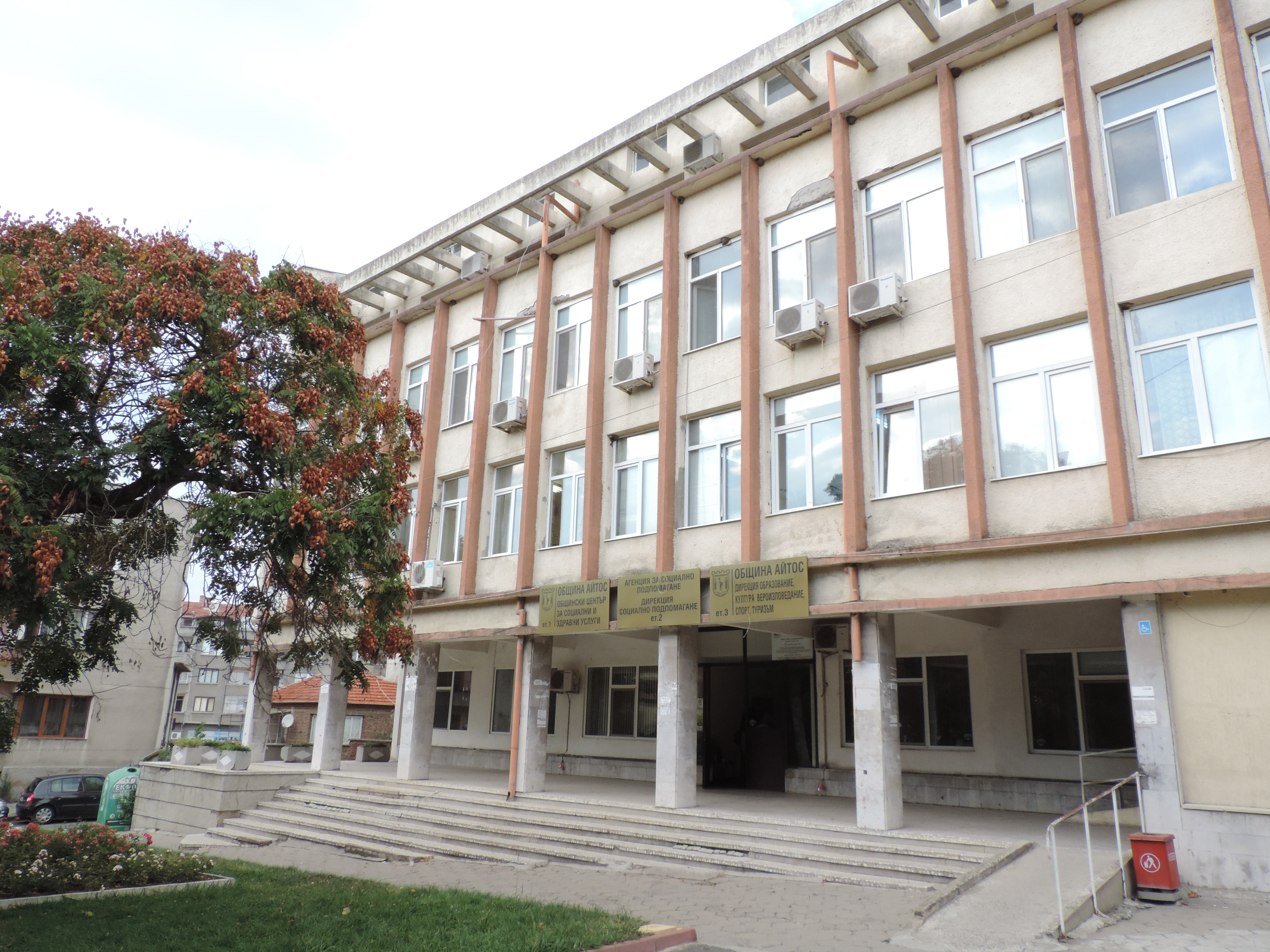
Additional building of the municipality
