= 790s =

Decade

Migration of the Saxons in 797

The 790s decade ran from January 1, 790, t o December 31, 799.

== Events ==
=== By place ===
==== Byzantine Empire ====
- September – The Armeniac Theme, located in northeastern Asia Minor (modern Turkey), revolts against Empress Irene, and declares the 19-year-old Constantine VI sole ruler of the Byzantine Empire. Other themes follow its example, and imprison their strategoi. Constantine sends his iconoclast general Michael Lachanodrakon, to ensure that the Armeniacs (his closest supporters) take an oath. Irene is confined and imprisoned in her palace at Constantinople; all her eunuchs are exiled.

==== Europe ====
- Alcuin, Anglo-Saxon missionary, returns (after an 8-year absence) to England. During his stay at the Carolingian court of King Charlemagne in Aachen, he has educated his sons Charles, Pepin and Louis. Alcuin revises the church liturgy and the Bible, and is responsible for an intellectual movement within the Frankish Kingdom.

==== Britain ====
- King Æthelred I returns to Northumbria, and is restored to the throne after living in exile for 11 years. His rival Osred II is deposed, forcibly tonsured, and exiled to the Isle of Man. Æthelred then faces a rebellion by another rival, named Eardwulf. The latter is captured, and hanged outside the gates to Ripon Abbey. The body is taken into the abbey, where Eardwulf recovers and escapes to exile.
- King Offa of Mercia takes control of East Anglia. King Æthelberht II mints his own coins, in defiance of his overlord (approximate date).

==== Asia ====
- Cambodia begins to break away from the Sumatra-based kingdom Srivijaya, as a 20-year-old Cambodian prince, who claims descent from the rulers of Funan, is consecrated in eastern Cambodia with the title Jayavarman II. In the next 10 years he will extend his powers north into the Mekong Valley (modern Vietnam).

=== By topic ===
==== Religion ====
- Irish monks (known as the Papar), possibly members of a Hiberno-Scottish mission, supposedly reach Iceland in hide-covered coracles, and begin settlements (approximate date). However, the evidence for this is scant.
- Angilbert, Frankish diplomat (primicerius palatii) of King Charlemagne, is made abbot of Saint-Riquier (Northern France).
- Joseph is consecrated Syriac Orthodox Patriarch of Antioch

=== By place ===
==== Europe ====
- The Avars, a pagan Asian nomadic horde that has settled down in what is today Hungary, invade Friuli and Bavaria. King Charlemagne assembles a Frankish army, and marches down the Danube River to ravage Avar territory. A Frankish-Lombard expeditionary force, under his son Pepin, (king of the Lombards) invades the Drava Valley and devastates Pannonia.
- Summer – Charlemagne loses most of his riding and baggage horses during an equine epidemic; many Saxons take advantage of Charlemagne's Avar setback and rebel once more.
- September 14 – Alfonso II, the son of former king Fruela I, becomes ruler of Asturias (Northern Spain). He moves the capital to Oviedo, the commercial centre of the region.

==== Britain ====
- Princes Ælf and Ælfwine of Northumbria, the sons of former king Ælfwald I, are persuaded to leave their sanctuary in York Minster, and are immediately forcibly drowned in Wonwaldremere, at the instigation of King Æthelred I.

==== Africa ====
- Emir Idris I, founder of the Idrisid dynasty and kingdom of Morocco, is poisoned on orders of Caliph Harun al-Rashid. He is succeeded by his son Idris II (only just two months old), who is raised by his mother Kenza among the Berbers of Volubilis.

=== By place ===
==== Byzantine Empire ====
- Spring – Emperor Constantine VI suppresses a rebellion, and restores his mother Irene to her former position as co-empress of the Byzantine Empire. The rival factions in Constantinople continue their intrigues against Constantine.
- Battle of Marcellae: Constantine VI leads a Byzantine expeditionary force into northern Thrace. At the border castle of Marcellae, near the modern town of Karnobat (Bulgaria), the Bulgarians under Kardam defeat the Byzantines.

==== Europe ====
- The Westphalians rise up against the Saxons, in response to a forcible recruitment for wars against the Avars. However, Pepin, sub-king of Northern Italy and son of King Charlemagne, continues the war, and wins considerable booty from the Avars.
- Charlemagne's son Pepin the Hunchback attempts to rebel against him with the aid of some Frankish nobles. The plot is discovered and Pepin is banished to a monastery at Prüm.

==== Britain ====
- September – King Æthelred I of Northumbria marries Princess Ælfflæd, daughter of King Offa of Mercia, at Catterick. Unrest in Northumbria tempts the exiled king Osred II back to his kingdom from the Isle of Man. His supporters desert him, and Osred II is killed by Æthelred's men at Aynburg. He is buried at Tynemouth Priory.
- Offa arranges coastal defences to fend off Viking attacks. He forms an alliance with Essex, Kent and Sussex, in an attempt to unify England (approximate date).

=== By place ===
==== Europe ====
- King Charlemagne orders a 3 kilometre long channel dug from Treuchtlingen to Weißenburg (the Rhine and Danube river basins), to improve the transportation of goods between the Rhineland and Bavaria. Charlemagne's son, Pepin of Italy, campaigns against the Lombards in Benevento (Southern Italy).
- Frisian–Frankish War: Count Theoderic is sent to Frisia, to muster troops for another offensive against the Avar Khaganate. He is attacked and probably killed by Saxon rebels, near the mouth of the Weser River. The Frisians revolt, and Charlemagne deports Saxon families from north of the river Elbe.

==== Britain ====
- June 8 – Viking raiders attack the Northumbrian coast, arriving in longships from either Denmark or Norway, and sacking the monastery of Lindisfarne. Many of the monks are killed or enslaved. It is the first Viking attack on a monastery in the British Isles, although it is not the first known Viking attack in the British Isles. The first attack came in 789, when Vikings raided the settlement of Portland in Dorset.

==== Arabian Empire ====
- Emir Hisham I of Córdoba calls for a jihad ("Holy War") against the Christian Franks. He assembles an army of 70,000 men, half of which attacks the Kingdom of Asturias, destroying its capital, Oviedo, while the other half invades Languedoc, penetrating as far as Narbonne. After capturing the city, the contingent moves towards Carcassonne and conquers it too. Both armies return to Córdoba enriched with the spoils of war.

=== By topic ===
==== Commerce ====
- Arab traders make Baghdad a financial center of the Silk Road between China and Europe. Caravans carry little or no money on their long journeys; Chinese traders use what they call fei qian (zh) ("flying money") to avoid robbery. The Arabs have adopted a similar banking system known as hawala to transmit funds (approximate date).

==== Religion ====
- August 17 – Quriaqos of Tagrit is consecrated Syriac Orthodox Patriarch of Antioch at Harran.
- King Offa of Mercia founds an abbey at St Albans.

=== By place ===
==== Europe ====
- King Charlemagne abandons his channel project (see 793), and attacks the Saxon rebels from the north, supported by a second Frankish army under his son Charles the Younger, which crosses the Rhine at Cologne from the west; threatened from two directions, the Saxons surrender near Paderborn (Westphalia).
- August 10 – Queen Fastrada, third wife of Charlemagne, dies in Frankfurt after 11 years of marriage. Charlemagne consoles himself with Luitgard, an Alemannian noblewoman, whom he marries and moves into his new palace at Aachen (Germany). Luitgard shares Charlemagne's interest in the liberal arts.
- King Louis I (son of Charlemagne), age 16, marries Ermengarde of Hesbaye. She is a Frankish noblewoman and the daughter of Ingerman, count of Hesbaye (modern Belgium).

==== Britain ====
- May 20 – King Æthelberht II of East Anglia visits the royal Mercian court at Sutton Walls (Herefordshire), with a view to marrying Princess Ælfthryth. He is taken captive and beheaded, on the orders of King Offa.
- Vikings sack the Monkwearmouth–Jarrow Abbey in Northumbria (the second monastery target in England of the Vikings, after the raids on Lindisfarne in 793).

==== Asia ====
- Kyoto becomes the Japanese capital, ending the Nara period, and beginning the Heian period; a Golden Age of Japanese culture begins that will endure under the domination of the Fujiwara, Minamoto, Tachibana and Taira families, until 1185.

=== By topic ===
==== Communication ====
- A paper mill begins production at Baghdad during the Abbasid era, as the Arabs spread the techniques developed by Chinese papermakers. Baghdad becomes a great seat of learning, with Christian and Jewish scholars as well as Muslims, while Europe remains largely unlettered. The Arabs will become the world's most proficient papermakers.

==== Religion ====
- Council of Frankfurt: King Charlemagne calls for a church meeting of the Frankish realm. Bishops and priests from Francia, Aquitaine, Italy, and Provence are gathered in Franconofurd (modern-day Frankfurt am Main).

=== By place ===
==== Europe ====
- Saxon War: The Slav Obodrites, under their ruler Witzan, attack the northern Saxons in Liuni. He is killed in an ambush and succeeded by his son Drożko (Thrasco), who becomes a Carolingian dux. King Charlemagne leads a Frankish expeditionary force north from Mainz, and marches to the Elbe, where eastern Saxon rebels again surrender.
- Charlemagne creates the Hispanic Marches, a buffer zone beyond the former province of Septimania. A group of Iberian lordships form a defensive barrier between the Umayyad Moors of Al-Andalus (modern Spain) and the Frankish Kingdom.
- In the earliest recorded Viking raid on Ireland, they attack the monasteries at Iona (Inner Hebrides), Inishbofin and Inishmurray (approximate date).

==== Britain ====
- Quarrels between the kings Cynan Dindaethwy and Hywel leave the way open for Caradog ap Meirion (the House of Rhos) to usurp the throne of Gwynedd (modern Wales).
- King Offa of Mercia receives diplomatic gifts from Charlemagne. He re-founds St. Albans Abbey, supposedly in thanks for overrunning East Anglia (approximate date).

=== By topic ===
==== Religion ====
- December 25 – Pope Adrian I, age 95, dies after a 23-year reign, and is succeeded by Leo III as the 96th pope of Rome.
- December 26 – Leo III is elected to serve as Pope on the day his predecessor Adrian I is buried, and is consecrated the following day.
- Paul the Deacon, a Benedictine monk at Monte Cassino, completes the History of the Lombards (approximate date).

=== By place ===
==== North America ====
- The Three Fires Confederacy is formed at Michilimackinac.

==== Europe ====
- King Charlemagne organizes an invasion of the Avar Khaganate, with one army under his son Pepin of Italy and another army under one of his vassals, the Croat Duke Vojnomir. The two armies launch a successful two-pronged invasion of the Avar Khaganate (modern Hungary). They seize the Avar "ring" (the nomadic tent capital), destroying Avar power before returning with so much booty in gold and jewels that 15 wagons, each drawn by four oxen, are needed to bring it back to Frankish territory. Charlemagne wins a major victory (in which the Lower Pannonian duke Vojnomir aids him), and the Franks make themselves overlords over the Croatians of northern Dalmatia, Slavonia, and Pannonia. Frankish missionaries are sent to the area to convert the pagan population to Christianity.

==== Britain ====
- April 18 – King Æthelred I of Northumbria is murdered, probably at Corbridge, by his ealdormen, Ealdred and Wada. Another rival, Torhtmund, slays Ealdred in revenge. Northumbria is plunged into chaos. The patrician Osbald is placed on the throne, but is deserted by his supporters after only 27 days. He flees from Lindisfarne to Pictland. Another faction brings back Æthelred I's old back-from-the-dead rival, Eardwulf, as the new king. He dismisses his wife and publicly takes a concubine. Eardwulf is alienated from Archbishop Eanbald of York.
- King Offa of Mercia and Charlemagne seal a trading agreement, and a marriage alliance is proposed. However, Offa dies after a 39-year reign, that has incorporated Kent, Essex, Sussex, and East Anglia into the Mercian realm. Offa is buried at Bedford, and succeeded for a short time by his son Ecgfrith, and then a distant cousin, Coenwulf.
- The Kingdom of Sussex again becomes independent from the Kingdom of Mercia following the death of King Offa.
- Prince Eadberht Præn leaves the Church, returns to Kent and claims his throne. Eadwald proclaims himself king of East Anglia, but is later ousted by Coenwulf. Direct rule from Mercia is re-established.

=== By topic ===
==== Religion ====
- Alcuin, Anglo-Saxon monk and scholar, is appointed as abbot by Charlemagne, who puts him in charge of leading Marmoutier Abbey in Tours.
- Tō-ji, a Buddhist temple of the Shingon sect, is established in Kyoto, Japan.

=== By place ===
==== Byzantine Empire ====
- April 19 or August 19 – Empress Irene organizes a conspiracy against her son Constantine VI. He is captured and blinded; Irene exiles him to Principo, where he dies shortly thereafter of his wounds. Irene begins a 5-year reign, and calls herself basileus ("emperor") of the Byzantine Empire. (Sources and historians conflict on whether this was in April or August.)

==== Europe ====
- King Charlemagne issues the Capitulare Saxonicum, making Westphalian, Angrian and Eastphalian Saxons equal to other peoples in the Frankish Kingdom. The Nordalbian Saxons revolt; a Frankish fleet is sent to the North Sea coast of Germany. It lands in Hadeln, a marshy coastal region between the Weser and Elbe estuaries, near modern-day Cuxhaven. Charlemagne invades northern Saxony, and again accepts the submission of the Saxons.

==== Britain ====
- Battle of Rhuddlan: Welsh forces, including those of Powys and Dyfed, clash with Mercians. King Coenwulf tries to re-assert his domination of northeast Wales. King Caradog ap Meirion of Gwynedd is killed during the fighting (approximate date).

=== By place ===
==== Europe ====
- Battle of Bornhöved: King Charlemagne forms an alliance with the Obodrites. Together with Prince Drożko (Thrasco), he defeats the Nordalbian Saxons near the village of Bornhöved (modern-day Neumünster), obliging these 'northerners' to submit and give hostages against their future good behavior. In the coming years they are granted areas of present-day Hamburg.
- King Charles the Younger, a son of Charlemagne, conquers Corsica and Sardinia (approximate date).

==== Britain ====
- King Coenwulf of Mercia invades Gwynedd (modern Wales), and kills his rival Caradog ap Meirion during the fighting in Snowdonia. Kings Cynan and Hywel retake the throne. Coenwulf also defeats and captures King Eadberht Præn of Kent. He is blinded and his hands are cut off. He introduces his brother Cuthred as a sub-king of Kent (approximate date).
- Battle of Billington: King Eardwulf of Northumbria defeats the nobleman Wada in battle, who has killed former King Æthelred I (see 796).
- King Sigeric I of Essex abdicates and departs for a pilgrimage to Rome. He is succeeded by his son Sigered.

==== Iberia ====
- King Alfonso II of Asturias campaigns against the Arab Muslims in Al-Andalus. With Frankish military support, he raids into Andalusia and sacks Lisbon (modern Portugal).
- Bahlul ibn Marzuq, a Vascon-Muslim military leader, revolts in Zaragoza against the Arab-Muslim government of Al-Andalus.

=== By topic ===
==== Religion ====
- Alcuin, Anglo-Saxon monk and scholar, writes to his friend, the exiled king Osbald of Northumbria, in order to dissuade him.
- Theodulf, Frankish poet, is appointed bishop of Orléans. He becomes one of Charlemagne's favoured theologians.

=== By place ===
==== Europe ====
- Autumn – Siege of Trsat: Višeslav, prince or duke of Dalmatian Croatia, decisively defeats an invading Frankish army under Eric of Friuli, during the siege at the fortress city of Trsat (Rijeka).
- The Vikings raid the island of Noirmoutier, and attack the monastery of Saint Philibert of Jumièges.

==== Britain ====
- King Eardwulf of Northumbria, worried about further rivals, has ealdorman Moll killed. Former king Osbald dies as an abbot in exile. He is buried in an unmarked grave in York Minster.

=== By topic ===
==== Religion ====
- April 25 – Pope Leo III is physically attacked by a band of aristocratic conspirators, under the leadership of a public official who is a nephew of the late Pope Adrian I. After mistreatment and attempted disfigurement by the citizens of Rome, Leo flees to the court of King Charlemagne at Paderborn (modern Germany) to seek protection. He sends him back with Frankish agents, and restores him to the papal throne.

== Significant people ==
- Harun al-Rashid
- Charlemagne
- Irene of Athens, Byzantine Empress
- Zubaidah bint Ja'far
- Offa of Mercia
- Alfonso II of Asturias

== Births ==
790

- Athanasia of Aegina, Byzantine noblewoman, adviser and saint (approximate date)
- Cyngen ap Cadell, king of Powys (Wales)
- Fātimah bint Mūsā, Muslim saint (d. 816)
- Íñigo Arista, king of Pamplona (approximate date)
- Leo IV, pope of the Catholic Church (d. 855)
- Li He, Chinese poet (d. 816)
- Lu Tong, Chinese poet (d. 835)
- Musa ibn Musa al-Qasawi, Muslim military leader (d. 862)
- Ramiro I, king of Asturias (approximate date)

791

- Idris II, Muslim emir of Morocco (d. 828)
- Pei Xiu, chancellor of the Tang dynasty (d. 864)

792

- Abd al-Rahman II, Muslim emir of Córdoba (d. 852)
- Abo, Japanese prince (d. 842)
- Adrian II, pope of the Catholic Church (d. 872)
- Bai Minzhong, chancellor of the Tang Dynasty (d. 861)
- Virasena, Indian mathematician (d. 853)

793

- Arnulf of Sens, Frankish nobleman (or 794)
- Li Ning, prince of the Tang Dynasty (d. 812)
- Theophylact, Byzantine co-emperor (approximate date)
- Wei Mo, chancellor of the Tang Dynasty (d. 858)
- Wu Yuanji, general of the Tang Dynasty (or 783)
- Zhou Chi, chancellor of the Tang Dynasty (d. 851)

794

- Arnulf of Sens, Frankish nobleman (or 793)
- Du Cong, chancellor of the Tang Dynasty

795

- Æthelwulf, king of Wessex (approximate date)
- Babak Khorramdin, Persian military leader (or 798)
- Bernard of Septimania, Frankish duke (d. 844)
- Gregory IV, pope of the Catholic Church (d. 844)
- Judith of Bavaria, Frankish queen (or 797/805)
- Landulf I, gastald (or count) of Capua (approximate date)
- Lothair I, king and emperor of the Franks (d. 855)
- Mu Zong, emperor of the Tang Dynasty (d. 824)
- Nithard, Frankish historian (d. 844)
- Renaud d'Herbauges, Frankish nobleman (d. 843)

796

- Al-Mu'tasim, Muslim caliph (d. 842)
- Dhul-Nun al-Misri, Egyptian scholar and Sufi (d. 859)
- Ibrahim ibn Ya'qub al-Juzajani, Muslim hadith scholar
- Liu Zhuan, chancellor of the Tang Dynasty (d. 858)
- Lü Dongbin, Chinese scholar and poet
- Xiao Fang, chancellor of the Tang Dynasty (d. 875)

797

- Bernard of Italy, king of the Lombards (d. 818)
- Ignatius I, patriarch of Constantinople (or 798)
- Judith of Bavaria, Frankish empress (or 805)
- Meinrad of Einsiedeln, German hermit (d. 861)
- Pepin I of Aquitaine, king of Aquitaine (d. 838)
- Shinshō, Japanese Buddhist monk (d. 873)

798

- Abdallah ibn Tahir, Muslim governor (approximate date)
- Babak Khorramdin, Persian military leader (approximate date)
- Ignatius I, patriarch of Constantinople (approximate date)

799

- Jiang Shen, chancellor of the Tang Dynasty (d. 881)
- Langdarma, emperor of Tibet (approximate date)
- Zhang Yichao, Chinese general (approximate date)

== Deaths ==
790

- Fujiwara no Otomuro, Japanese empress consort (b. 760)
- Thecla of Kitzingen, saint and abbess
- Torson, Frankish count of Toulouse (or 789)

791

- Artgal mac Cathail, king of Connacht (Ireland)
- Idris I, emir and founder of the Idrisid dynasty (b. 745)
- Wermad, bishop of Trier
- Zhang Xiaozhong, general of the Tang dynasty (b. 730)

792

- August 12 – Jænberht, archbishop of Canterbury
- Cináed mac Artgail, king of Connacht (Ireland)
- Máel Ruain, Irish abbot and founder of Tallaght Abbey
- Michael Lachanodrakon, Byzantine general (strategos)
- Osred II, king of Northumbria

793

- February 22 – Sicga, Anglo-Saxon nobleman
- Idriss I, Muslim emir and founder of the Idrisid Dynasty (or 791)

794

- May 20 – Æthelberht II, king of East Anglia
- August 10 – Fastrada, Frankish queen consort (b. 765)
- Solus, Anglo-Saxon missionary and saint (approximate date)

795

- December 25 – Adrian I, pope of the Catholic Church (b. 700)
- Ælfthryth of Crowland, Anglo-Saxon princess
- Bran Ardchenn, king of Leinster (Ireland)
- Malik ibn Anas, founder of the Maliki School (b. 711)
- Witzan, Obodrite prince

796

- April 18 – Æthelred I, king of Northumbria
- June 12 – Hisham I, Muslim emir (b. 757)
- July 29 – Offa, king of Mercia (b. 730)
- August 10 – Eanbald, archbishop of York
- Colla mac Fergusso, king of Connacht (Ireland)
- Ecgfrith, king of Mercia
- Fujiwara no Tsuginawa, Japanese statesman (b. 727)
- Muhammad ibn Ibrahim al-Fazari, Muslim philosopher (or 806)
- Sibawayh, Persian linguist and grammarian (b. 760)
- Tassilo III, duke of Bavaria (approximate date)

797

- February 6 – Donnchad Midi, High King of Ireland
- Æthelberht of Whithorn, Anglo-Saxon bishop
- Abd Allah ibn al-Mubarak, scholar and theologian
- Al-Hasan ibn Qahtaba, Muslim military leader
- Bermudo I, king of Asturias (approximate date)
- Caradog ap Meirion, king of Gwynedd (approximate date)
- Constantine VI, emperor of the Byzantine Empire (b. 771)
- Cummascach mac Fogartaig, king of South Brega
- Guan Bo, chancellor of the Tang Dynasty (b. 719)
- Muireadhach mac Olcobhar, Irish abbot

798

- Abu Yusuf, Muslim jurist and chief adviser
- Caradog ap Meirion, king of Gwynedd (or 797)
- Lu Mai, chancellor of the Tang Dynasty (b. 739)
- Wonseong, king of Silla (Korea)

799

- April 13 – Paul the Deacon, Lombard monk and historian
- September 4 – Musa al-Kadhim, seventh Twelver Shī‘ah Imam (b. 745)
- Eric, duke of Friuli
- Gerold, Alamannian nobleman
- Huaisu, Chinese Buddhist monk (b. 737)
- Osbald, king of Northumbria
