= 850s =

Decade

The 850s decade ran from January 1, 850, to December 31, 859.

== Events ==
=== 850 ===
==== By place ====
====== Europe ======
- February 1 – King Ramiro I dies in his palace at Santa María del Naranco (near Oviedo), after an 8-year reign. He is succeeded by his son Ordoño I, as ruler of Asturias.
- Danish Viking raiders, led by King Rorik, conquer Dorestad and Utrecht (modern-day Netherlands). Emperor Lothair I recognizes him as ruler of most of Friesland.
- King Louis II, the eldest son of Lothair I, is crowned joint emperor by Pope Leo IV at Rome, and becomes co-ruler of the Middle Frankish Kingdom.

====== Britain ======
- King Kenneth I (also called Kenneth MacAlpin) of Alba (modern Scotland) invades Northern Northumbria during the period of 850–858, burning Dunbar and Melrose.
- The Pillar of Eliseg is erected by King Cyngen ap Cadell of Powys (Wales), as a memorial to his great-grandfather Elisedd ap Gwylog (or Eliseg) (approximate date).

==== Middle East ====
- The Abbasid caliph al-Mutawakkil issues a decree that orders Jews and Christians to wear the zunnar, honey-coloured outer garments and badge-like patches on their on their servants' clothing.

====== Japan ======
- May 6 – Emperor Ninmyō dies after a 17-year reign. He is succeeded by his son Montoku, as the 55th emperor of Japan.

====== India ======
- It is hypothesized that sometime around 850 a group of Buddhist pilgrims travelling through a valley near Roopkund (modern India) were killed when caught out in the open in a sudden hailstorm. Their remains were discovered in 1942.

====== Mesoamerica ======
- Uxmal becomes the capital of a large state in the Puuk hills region of northern Yucatán (modern Mexico). The city is connected by causeways (sakbe) to other important Puuk sites, such as K'abah, Sayil, and Labna (approximate date).

==== By topic ====
====== Food and Drink ======
- Coffee is discovered (according to legend) by the Ethiopian goatherder Kaldi in East Africa, who notices that his goats become energetic after chewing the red berries from certain wild bushes (approximate date).

====== Religion ======
- April 22 – Gunther becomes archbishop of Cologne (modern Germany).
- June 18 – Perfecto, a Christian priest in Muslim Córdoba, is executed (beheaded) after he refuses to retract critical comments he made about Muhammad.

=== 851 ===
==== By place ====
====== Asia ======
- Bagrat II Bagratuni, Armenian prince and leader of a rebellion against the Abbasid Caliphate, is captured by the Abbasid army, and brought to the caliphal capital of Samarra.

====== Britain ======
- Danish Viking raiders enter the Thames Estuary, and plunder Canterbury and London. They land at Wembury near Plymouth, but are defeated by Anglo-Saxon forces led by King Ethelwulf of Wessex. His eldest son Æthelstan of Kent, accompanied by Ealdorman Ealhhere, attacks a Viking fleet off the coast at Sandwich, and captures nine of the enemy vessels while the remainder flees.

====== China ======
- Suleiman al-Tajir, Muslim merchant and traveller, visits China during the Tang Dynasty. He observes the manufacturing of Chinese porcelain at Guangzhou, and writes of his admiration for its transparent quality. Suleiman also describes the mosque at Guangzhou, its granaries, its local government administration, some of its written records, and the treatment of travellers, along with the use of ceramics, rice wine, and tea (approximate date).

====== Europe ======
- August 22 – Battle of Jengland: Duke Erispoe takes command of the Breton forces after his father Nominoe, king of Brittany, dies. He continues an offensive against the Franks in alliance with Lambert II of Nantes. In Ille-et-Vilaine near Grand-Fougeray (Brittany), Erispoe defeats a Frankish-Saxon army (4,000 men) led by King Charles the Bald.
- Treaty of Angers: Charles the Bald meets Erispoe in Angers, and acknowledges him as "king of Brittany". He recognizes the authority of Breton rule over the areas around Nantes, Rennes and Pays de Retz, which become part of the Breton March, a border zone. Erispoe takes the oath to Charles as king of the West Frankish Kingdom (but not an hommage lige which would be an allegiance). To mark the sovereignty of the Breton state, the future Dukes of Brittany are crowned as "Duke, king in their lands".
- September – King Pepin II of Aquitaine is captured by the forces of Count Sans II Sancion, and handed over to Charles the Bald. He is detained in the monastery of Saint Medard in Soissons.
- Emperor Lothair I meets with his (half) brothers Louis the German and Charles the Bald in Meerssen (modern-day Netherlands), to continue the system of "con-fraternal government".
- King Íñigo Arista of Pamplona dies after a 27-year reign. He is succeeded by his son García Íñiguez, as king of Pamplona (later Navarra).

==== By topic ====
====== Religion ======
- The Great Mosque of Samarra (modern Iraq) is completed during the reign of Caliph Al-Mutawakkil.

=== 852 ===
==== By place ====
====== Europe ======
- March 4 – Trpimir I, duke (knez) of Croatia, and founder of the Trpimirović dynasty, issues a first state document in Bijaći of all Slavonic peoples. In this Latin document Trpimir refers to himself as the "duke of the Croats" (dux Chroatorum), and to his country as the "state of the Croats" (regnum Chroatorum).
- Presian I, ruler (khan) of the Bulgarian Empire, dies after a 23-year reign in which the Bulgarians have expanded into Upper Macedonia and Serbia. He is succeeded by his son Boris I, as monarch of Bulgaria.
- Emperor Lothair I and his (half) brother Charles the Bald join forces to remove the Vikings from the island of Oscelles, in the River Seine. After this fails, Charles again pays them tribute (Danegeld).

====== Britain ======
- A Viking fleet of 350 vessels enters the Thames Estuary before turning north, and engages the Mercian forces under King Beorhtwulf. The Mercians are defeated, and retreat to their settlements. The Vikings then turn south and cross the river somewhere in Surrey; there they are slaughtered by a West Saxon army, led by King Æthelwulf and his son Aethelbald, at Oak Field (Aclea).
- King Æthelstan, the eldest son of Æthelwulf, is killed by a Viking raiding party. He is succeeded by his brother Æthelberht, who becomes sub-king of Kent, Essex, Surrey and Sussex (approximate date).
- Beorhtwulf dies after a 12-year reign, and is succeeded by his son Burgred as king of Mercia.

====== Al-Andalus ======
- Abd al-Rahman II, Umayyad emir of Córdoba, dies after a 30-year reign in which he has made additions to the Mosque–Cathedral at Córdoba. He is succeeded by his son Muhammad I, who will put down several revolts of the Muwalladun and Mozarabs in Muslim controlled areas in al-Andalus (modern Spain).

==== By topic ====
====== Aviation ======
- According to a 17th century account, the Andalusian inventor Abbas ibn Firnas makes a tower jump in Córdoba. He wraps himself with vulture feathers and attaches two wings to his arms. The alleged attempt to fly is not recorded in earlier sources and is ultimately unsuccessful, but the garment slows his fall enough that he only sustains minor injuries.

====== Religion ======
- Gandersheim Abbey in Lower Saxony (modern Germany) is founded by Duke Liudolf of Saxony.

=== 853 ===
==== By place ====
====== Byzantine Empire ======
- May 22 – A Byzantine fleet (85 ships and 5,000 men) sacks and destroys the port city of Damietta, located on the Nile Delta in Egypt. A large quantity of weapons and supplies intended for the Emirate of Crete are captured.

====== Europe ======
- Danish Vikings attempt to subjugate the Curonians on the shoreline of the Baltic Sea, but they are repulsed. King Olof leads Swedish Vikings in retaliation, and attacks the towns of Seeburg and Apuolė (modern Courland).
- Viking marauders in Gaul sail eastward from Nantes without opposition, and reach Tours. The monasteries at Saint-Florent-le-Vieil and Marmoutier are ravaged.
- King Charles the Bald bribes Boris I, ruler (khan) of the Bulgarian Empire, to form an alliance against his brother Louis the German, with Rastislav of Moravia.
- Gauzbert, count of Maine, is killed during an ambush by citizens of Nantes, in revenge for the death of Lambert II.

====== Britain ======
- King Burgred of Mercia appeals to Æthelwulf, king of the West Saxons, for help against the rebellious Welsh king Rhodri the Great. Æthelwulf agrees to send help, and Wales is subdued as far north as Anglesey.
- Burgred (who inherited his crown last year) marries Æthelwulf's daughter Æthelswith, during a ceremony at the royal estate at Chippenham.

====== China ======
- Tuan Ch'eng-Shih, Chinese author and scholar during the Tang Dynasty, publishes Miscellaneous Offerings from Yu-yang.

==== By topic ====
====== Religion ======
- The Fraumünster Church in Zürich (modern Switzerland) is founded by Louis the German.

=== 854 ===
==== By place ====
====== Europe ======
- Emperor Lothair I meets his (half) brothers (Louis the German and Charles the Bald) in Attigny, Ardennes for the third time, to continue the system of "con-fraternal government".
- Viking chieftains Rorik and Godfrid Haraldsson return to Denmark, to gain power after the death of King Horik I. During a civil war, they are forced to go back to Friesland.
- The German city of Ulm is first mentioned, in a document by Louis the German.
- Croatian–Bulgarian battle: Bulgarian Khan (later Knyaz) Boris I, attacks the Duchy of Littoral Croatia, ruled by Duke Trpimir I during the First Croatian-Bulgarian War. It is fought on the Croatian territory in the vicinity of the Croatian–Bulgarian border in present-day northeastern Bosnia and Herzegovina. None of the warring sides emerges victorious, Bulgarian forces retreat and finally both parties subsequently conclude a peace treaty.

====== Britain ======
- King Æthelwulf of Wessex sends his two youngest sons, Alfred and Æthelred, on a pilgrimage to Rome.
- King Æthelweard of East Anglia dies, and is succeeded by his 14-year-old son Edmund ("the Martyr").
- King Cyngen of Powys makes the first pilgrimage to Rome of a Welsh ruler.
- Viking chieftain Ubba winters in Milford Haven (Wales) with 23 ships.

==== By topic ====
====== Religion ======
- Eardulf becomes bishop of Lindisfarne, after the death of Eanbert.

=== 855 ===
==== By place ====
====== Byzantine Empire ======
- November 20 – Theoktistos, co-regent of the Empire on behalf of 15-year old Emperor Michael III, is murdered on the orders of Michael.

====== Central Europe ======
- September 29 – Emperor Lothair I dies after a 15-year reign (co-ruling with his father Louis the Pious until 840). He divides the Middle Frankish Kingdom between his three sons in an agreement called the Treaty of Prüm—the eldest, Louis II, receives the northern half of Italy and the title of Holy Roman Emperor. The second, Lothair II, receives Lotharingia (the Low Countries and Upper Burgundy). The youngest, Charles, receives Lower Burgundy and Provence.

====== Britain ======
- Spring – King Æthelwulf of Wessex decides to go on a pilgrimage to Rome, accompanied by his youngest son Alfred (age 6) and a large retinue. He divides the kingdom between his two eldest sons; Æthelbald receives the western part of Wessex, while Æthelberht becomes ruler over Kent, Surrey, Sussex and Essex.

====== Abbasid Caliphate ======
- Caliph al-Mutawakkil sends an Abbasid army, led by the Turkic general Bugha al-Kabir, to suppress an uprising of rebellious Armenian nakharars. He subdues the country, and deports many Armenian nobles to the caliphal capital of Samarra.

==== By topic ====
====== Religion ======
- July 17 – Pope Leo IV dies after an 8-year reign, and is succeeded by Benedict III as the 104th pope of Rome. Anastasius is made anti-pope by Lothair I.
- Æthelwulf grants churches in Wessex the right to receive tithes. He gives one-tenth of his lands to the Church.
- The Slavic alphabet is created by Saints Cyril and Methodius.

=== 856 ===
==== By place ====
====== Byzantine Empire ======
- March 15 – Emperor Michael III overthrows the regency of his mother Theodora. He appoints his uncle Bardas as the de facto regent and co-ruler of the Byzantine Empire.

====== Europe ======
- King Charles the Bald cedes the county of Maine to Erispoe, ruler (duke) of Brittany—this in return for an alliance against the Vikings.
- King Ordoño I of Asturias is said to have begun the repopulation of the town of León in the northwest of Spain (approximate date).

====== Britain ======
- October 1 – King Æthelwulf of Wessex marries the 12- or 13-year-old Judith, daughter of Charles the Bald, at Verberie (Northern France). She is crowned queen and anointed by Hincmar, archbishop of Reims. The marriage is a diplomatic alliance between Wessex and the West Frankish Kingdom.
- Winter – Æthelwulf returns to Wessex to face a revolt by his eldest son Æthelbald, who usurps the throne. Æthelwulf agrees to give up the western part of his kingdom, in order to avoid a civil war. He keeps control over Sussex, Surrey, Essex and Kent, over which Prince Æthelberht has presided.

==== By topic ====
====== Geology ======
- November (approximate date) – An earthquake in Corinth, Greece kills an estimated 45,000 people.
- December 3 – Another earthquake strikes the Abbasid Caliphate (modern-day Tunisia), also killing an estimated 45,000 people.
- December 22 – Another earthquake strikes Damghan (modern-day Iran), killing an estimated 200,000 people.

=== 857 ===
==== By place ====
====== Byzantine Empire ======
- Emperor Michael III, under the influence of his uncle Bardas, banishes his mother Theodora to the Gastria Monastery. Bardas, the de facto regent, becomes the most powerful person in the Byzantine Empire.

====== Europe ======
- November – Erispoe, ruler (duke) of Brittany, is assassinated by his cousin Salomon and followers, in the church at Talensac. King Charles the Bald acknowledges Salomon as the rightful 'king' of Brittany.
- A Danish Viking fleet raids the cities of Dorestad, Paris and Orléans. Others sail up the Oise River, ravaging Beauvais and the abbey of Saint-Germer-de-Fly (approximate date).
- Viking chieftain Rorik, with the agreement of King Lothair II, leaves Dorestad with a fleet and forces his rival Horik II to recognise him as ruler over Denmark (approximate date).

==== By topic ====
====== Medicine ======
- The first recorded major outbreak of ergotism kills thousands of people in the Rhine Valley. They have eaten bread made from rye infected with the ergot fungus parasite Claviceps purpurea (approximate date).

=== 858 ===
==== By place ====
====== Europe ======
- Summer – King Louis the German, summoned by the disaffected Frankish nobles, invades the West Frankish Kingdom and secures Aquitaine for his nephew Pepin II ("the Younger"). King Charles the Bald flees to Burgundy; he is saved by the help of the bishops, and by the fidelity of the family of the Welfs, who are related to Judith (second wife of former emperor Louis the Pious).
- Viking raiders, led by Björn Ironside, set fire to the earliest church on the site of Chartres Cathedral. Charles the Bald pays him tribute (Danegeld) to save Verberie (Northern France).

====== Britain ======
- January 13 – King Æthelwulf of Wessex dies after an 18-year reign, and is succeeded by his eldest son Æthelbald. He marries his father's young widow Judith (daughter of Charles the Bald), and becomes sole ruler of Wessex. His brother, Æthelberht, is left to rule Kent and the south-east of England.
- February 13 – King Kenneth I (Cináed mac Ailpín), king of the Scots, dies after a 15-year reign in which he has been crowned at Scone, and united the various parts of Scotland with his native Dál Riata. His 46-year-old brother succeeds as Donald I, king of Alba.

====== Asia ======
- October 7 – Emperor Montoku dies after an 8-year reign. He is succeeded by his 8-year-old son Seiwa as the 56th emperor of Japan, with Fujiwara no Yoshifusa (Seiwa's grandfather) governing as regent and great minister of the Council of State.
- An enormous flood along the Grand Canal inundates thousands of acres of farmland and kills tens of thousands of people in the North China Plain.

==== By topic ====
====== Religion ======
- April 17 – Pope Benedict III dies after a 3-year reign, in which he has intervened in a political conflict between the sons of Emperor Lothair I. He is succeeded by Nicholas I, as the 105th pope of Rome.
- Synod of Quierzy: The bishops remain loyal to Charles the Bald during the invasion of his dominions by Louis the German. They address a conciliatory letter to Louis the German, which includes the False Decretals.
- October 23 – Ignatios I, patriarch of Constantinople, is imprisoned by orders of Emperor Michael III, and replaced by the layman Photius I.

=== 859 ===
==== By place ====
====== Europe ======
- January 15 – Battle of St. Quentin: Frankish forces, led by Humfrid, defeat King Louis the German at Saint-Quentin (Northern France). Humfrid is enfeoffed with the County of Autun, and appointed Margrave of Burgundy, by King Charles the Bald.
- Summer – The Viking chieftains Hastein and Björn Ironside (a son of Ragnar Lodbrok) begin an expedition, and sail from the Loire River with a fleet of 62 ships, to raid cities and monasteries in the Mediterranean Sea.
- Viking raiders invade the Kingdom of Pamplona (Western Pyrenees), and capture King García Íñiguez I, somewhere in the Andalusian heartland. They extort a ransom, rising to around 70,000 gold dinars.
- The Russian city of Novgorod is first mentioned in the Sofia Chronicles.
- Winter – The weather is so severe that the Adriatic Sea freezes, and Italy is covered in snow for 100 days.

====== Iberian Peninsula ======
- Battle of Albelda: King Ordoño I of Asturias, and his ally García Íñiguez I, defeat the Muslims under Musa ibn Musa al-Qasawi at Albelda.
- Viking raiders burn the mosques of Seville and Algeciras in al-Andalus (modern Spain).

====== Africa ======
- The University of Al Karaouine is founded in Fes (modern Morocco), by Fatima al-Fihri (recognized by the Guinness Book of World Records as the oldest still-operating university in the world).

====== China ======
- September 7 – Emperor Xuān Zong (Li Yi) dies after a 13-year reign. He is succeeded by his eldest son Yi Zong, as ruler of the Tang dynasty.

====== Syria ======
- 859 Syrian coast earthquake. It affected the Mediterranean coast of Syria It caused almost the complete destruction of Latakia and Jableh, major damage at Antioch and led to many deaths.

== Significant people ==
- Al-Mutawakkil
- Charles the Bald
- Louis the German
- Lothar
- Ethelwulf of Wessex
- Bardas
- Kenneth I of Scotland
- Halfdan the Black
- Abu Ja'far Muhammad ibn Musa al-Khwarizmi

== Births ==
850

- June 27 – Ibrahim II, emir of the Aghlabids (d. 902)
- Abu Zayd al-Balkhi, Muslim mathematician (d. 934)
- Adelaide, queen of the West Frankish Kingdom (or 853)
- Aribo of Austria, Frankish margrave (approximate date)
- Arnulf of Carinthia, king of the East Frankish Kingdom (d. 899)
- Berno of Cluny, Frankish abbot (approximate date)
- Du Guangting, Chinese Taoist priest and writer (d. 933)
- Gerolf of Holland, count of Friesland (approximate date)
- Harald Fairhair, king of Norway (approximate date)
- Hatto I, Frankish archbishop (approximate date)
- Herbert I, count of Vermandois (approximate date)
- Hermenegildo Gutiérrez, Galician nobleman (d. 912)
- Hucbald, Frankish music theorist (or 840)
- Ki no Tomonori, Japanese poet (approximate date)
- Onneca Fortúnez, Basque princess (or 848)
- Ranulf II, duke of Aquitaine (d. 890)
- Reginar I, duke of Lorraine (approximate date)
- Seiwa, emperor of Japan (d. 878)
- Smbat I, king of Armenia (approximate date)
- Tuotilo, German monk and composer (approximate date)

851

- Otto I, duke of Saxony (approximate date)

852

- March 10 – Qian Liu, Chinese warlord and king (d. 932)
- Bořivoj I, duke of Bohemia (approximate date)
- Nicholas I Mystikos, Byzantine patriarch (d. 925)
- Yang Xingmi, Chinese governor (jiedushi) (d. 905)
- Ermengard of Italy, queen regent of Provence (d. 896)
- Zhang Quanyi, Chinese warlord (d. 926)
- Zhu Wen, emperor of Later Liang (d. 912)

853

- Abu Jafar al-Tahawi, Muslim scholar (d. 933)
- Abu Mansur al-Maturidi, Muslim theologian (d. 944)
- Adelaide, queen of the West Frankish Kingdom (or 850)
- Ma Yin, Chinese warlord and king (approximate date)

854

- Al-Mu'tadid, Muslim caliph (or 861)
- Cadell ap Rhodri, king of Seisyllwg (d. 909)
- Cui Yin, chancellor of the Tang Dynasty (d. 904)
- Theobald the Elder, Frankish nobleman (d. 942)

855

- Abu'l-Hasan Ali ibn al-Furat, Muslim vizier (d. 924)
- Gerald of Aurillac, Frankish nobleman (approximate date)
- Guaimar I of Salerno, Lombard prince (approximate date)
- Han Jian, Chinese warlord (d. 912)
- Jing Hao, Chinese painter (d. 915)

856

- October 24 – Li Keyong, Shatuo governor (jiedushi) (d. 908)
- Li Maozhen, Chinese warlord and king (d. 924)

857

- Ch'oe Ch'i-wŏn, Korean philosopher and poet
- Li Cunjin, general of the Tang dynasty (d. 922)

858

- Al-Battani, Muslim astronomer and mathematician (d. 929)
- Cele Dabhaill mac Scannal, Irish abbot (d. 927)
- Gao Jixing, founder of Chinese Jingnan (d. 929)
- He Gui, general of Later Liang (d. 919)
- Lady Wu, wife of Qian Liu (d. 919)
- Liu Xun, general of Later Liang (d. 921)
- Mansur al-Hallaj, Persian mystic writer (d. 922)
- Niftawayh, Muslim scholar and grammarian (d. 935)
- Richard, duke of Burgundy (approximate date)
- Rudaki, Persian poet (approximate date)
- Tian Jun, Chinese warlord (d. 903)
- Zhang Juhan, official of Later Liang (d. 928)

859

- Al-Hadi ila'l-Haqq Yahya, first Zaydi Imam of Yemen (d. 911)
- Ali ibn Isa al-Jarrah, vizier of the Abbasid Caliphate (d. 946)
- Odo I, king of the West Frankish Kingdom (or 860)
- Rudolph I, king of Burgundy (d. 912)
- Tannet of Pagan, king of Burma (d. 904)

== Deaths ==
850

- February 1 – Ramiro I, king of Asturias
- May 6 – Ninmyō, emperor of Japan (b. 808)
- April 18 – Perfectus, Spanish monk and martyr
- July 14 – Wei Fu, chancellor of the Tang Dynasty
- Amalarius, Frankish archbishop (approximate date)
- Bishr al-Hafi, Muslim theologian (approximate date)
- Eanred, king of Northumbria (approximate date)
- Huangbo Xiyun, Chinese Zen Buddhist monk
- Ishaq ibn Ibrahim, Muslim official and advisor
- Li Deyu, chancellor of the Tang Dynasty (b. 787)
- Muhammad ibn Mūsā al-Khwārizmī, Persian mathematician
- Maura of Troyes, Frankish noblewoman and saint (b. 827)
- Tachibana no Kachiko, empress of Japan (b. 786)
- Stephen of Liège, Frankish bishop (approximate date)
- Vlastimir, Serbian prince (approximate date)
- William of Septimania, Frankish nobleman (b. 826)
- Zhou Lin, governor (jiedushi) of the Tang Dynasty

851

- March 7 – Nominoe, king (or duke) of Brittany
- March 20 – Ebbo, archbishop of Reims
- July 16 – Sisenandus, deacon and martyr
- Cináed mac Conaing, king of Brega (Ireland)
- Ermengarde of Tours, Frankish empress
- Íñigo Arista, king of Pamplona (or 852)
- Ishaq ibn Yahya ibn Mu'adh, Muslim governor
- Mor Frideborg, Swedish noblewoman
- Muhammad ibn Ishaq, Muslim governor
- Ólchobar mac Cináeda, king of Munster (Ireland)
- Radelchis I, prince (or duke) of Benevento
- Siconulf, prince of Salerno (approximate date)
- Vlastimir, prince of Serbia (approximate date)
- Zhou Chi, chancellor of the Tang Dynasty (b. 793)

852

- Abd al-Rahman II, Muslim emir of Córdoba (b. 792)
- Æthelstan, king of Kent (approximate date)
- Aleran, Frankish count and margrave
- Aurelius and Natalia, Christian martyrs
- Beorhtwulf (Bright Wolf), king of Mercia
- Du Mu, Chinese poet and official (b. 803)
- Fredelo, Frankish count (approximate date)
- Harald Klak, king of Denmark (approximate date)
- Íñigo Arista, king of Pamplona (or 851)
- Ishaq ibn Rahwayh, Muslim imam (or 853)
- Lambert II, Frankish count and prefect
- Li Jue, chancellor of the Tang Dynasty
- Presian I, ruler (khan) of the Bulgarian Empire

853

- March 27 – Haymo, bishop of Halberstadt
- Áilgenán mac Donngaile, king of Munster (Ireland)
- Columba, Spanish nun and martyr
- Ealhere, Kentish thegn
- Gauzbert, count of Maine (approximate date)
- Ishaq ibn Isma'il, emir of Tbilisi (Georgia)
- Ishaq ibn Rahwayh, Muslim imam (or 852)
- Konstanti Kakhi, Georgian nobleman (b. 768)
- Ono no Takamura, Japanese scholar (b. 802)
- Theodrada, Frankish abbess, daughter of Charlemagne (or 844)
- Virasena, Indian mathematician (b. 792)

854

- Abu Thawr, Muslim scholar (b. 764)
- Æthelweard, king of East Anglia
- Eanbert, bishop of Lindisfarne
- Horik I, Viking king of Denmark
- Liudger, bishop of Utrecht (approximate date)
- Osburh, queen of Wessex (approximate date)
- Sahnun ibn Sa'id, Muslim jurist (or 855)
- Túathal mac Máele-Brigte, king of Leinster
- Wang Yuankui, Chinese general (b. 812)
- Wigmund, archbishop of York

855

- July 17 – Leo IV, pope of the Catholic Church (b. 790)
- September 20 – Gozbald, abbot and bishop of Würzburg
- September 29 – Lothair I, Frankish king and emperor (b. 795)
- November 20 – Theoktistos, Byzantine chief minister
- December 8 – Drogo of Metz, illegitimate son of Charlemagne (b. 801)
- Ahmad ibn Hanbal, Muslim scholar and theologian (b. 780)
- Boso the Elder, count of Turin and Valois
- Cyngen ap Cadell, king of Powys (Wales)
- Elisedd ap Cyngen, king of Powys (Wales)
- Pepin, count of Vermandois (approximate date)
- Sahnun ibn Sa'id, Muslim jurist (or 854)
- Sico II, prince of Salerno (Italy)

856

- January 7 – Aldric, bishop of Le Mans
- February 4 – Rabanus Maurus, archbishop of Mainz
- August 6 – Fujiwara no Nagara, Japanese statesman (b. 802)
- August 16 – Theutbald I, bishop of Langres
- Florinus of Remüs, Frankish priest and martyr
- Godfrid Haraldsson, Viking chieftain (approximate date)
- Guerin, Frankish nobleman (or 845)
- Ilyas ibn Asad, Muslim emir (approximate date)
- Muhammad I Abu 'l-Abbas, Muslim emir

857

- March 11 – Eulogius, Spanish priest and martyr
- Dae Ijin, king of Balhae (Korea)
- Erispoe, king (duke) of Brittany
- Harith al-Muhasibi, Muslim teacher (b. 781)
- Hilderic of Farfa, Frankish abbot
- Kim Yang, viceroy of Silla (Korea) (b. 808)
- Yuhanna ibn Masawaiyh, Assyrian physician
- Matudán mac Muiredaig, king of Ulaid (Ireland)
- Ma Zhi, chancellor of the Tang dynasty
- Munseong, king of Silla (Korea)
- Roderick, Spanish priest and saint
- Wang Shaoding, Chinese governor (jiedushi)
- Yahya ibn Aktham, Muslim jurist
- Zheng Lang, chancellor of the Tang dynasty
- Ziryab, Muslim poet and musician (b. 789)

858

- January 13 – Æthelwulf, king of Wessex
- February 13 – Kenneth I, king of Scotland (b. 810)
- April 17 – Benedict III, pope of the Catholic Church

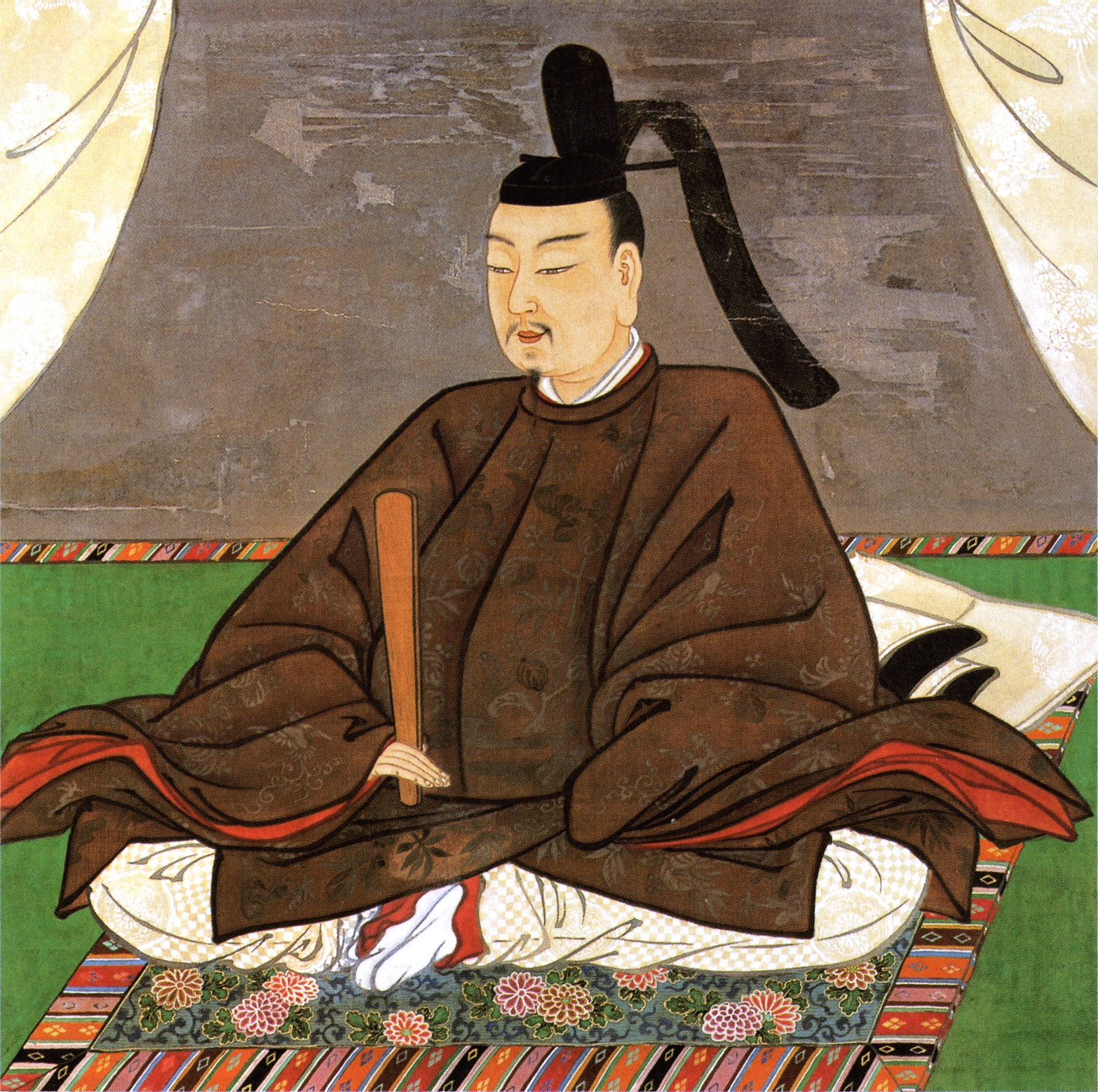
Emperor Montoku

- Leuthard II, Frankish count (or 869)
- Li Shangyin, Chinese official and poet
- Liu Zhuan, chancellor of the Tang dynasty (b. 796)
- Theodosius, patriarch of the Church of the East
- Wei Mo, chancellor of the Tang dynasty (b. 793)

859

- September 7 – Xuān Zong, emperor of the Tang dynasty (b. 810)
- December 13 – Angilbert II, archbishop of Milan
- Dhul-Nun al-Misri, Egyptian scholar and Sufi (b. 796)
- Immo, bishop of Noyon (approximate date)
- Lu Shang, chancellor of the Tang dynasty (b. 789)
- Máel Gualae, king of Munster (Ireland)
