= 797 =

Calendar year

797 in various calendars
- Gregorian calendar: 797; DCCXCVII
- Ab urbe condita: 1550
- Armenian calendar: 246; ԹՎ ՄԽԶ
- Assyrian calendar: 5547
- Balinese saka calendar: 718–719
- Bengali calendar: 203–204
- Berber calendar: 1747
- Buddhist calendar: 1341
- Burmese calendar: 159
- Byzantine calendar: 6305–6306
- Chinese calendar: 丙子年 (Fire Rat); 3494 or 3287 — to — 丁丑年 (Fire Ox); 3495 or 3288
- Coptic calendar: 513–514
- Discordian calendar: 1963
- Ethiopian calendar: 789–790
- Hebrew calendar: 4557–4558
- Hindu calendars
- Vikram Samvat: 853–854
- Shaka Samvat: 718–719
- Kali Yuga: 3897–3898
- Holocene calendar: 10797
- Iranian calendar: 175–176
- Islamic calendar: 180–181
- Japanese calendar: Enryaku 16 (延暦１６年)
- Javanese calendar: 692–693
- Julian calendar: 797; DCCXCVII
- Korean calendar: 3130
- Minguo calendar: 1115 before ROC 民前1115年
- Nanakshahi calendar: −671
- Seleucid era: 1108/1109 AG
- Thai solar calendar: 1339–1340
- Tibetan calendar: མེ་ཕོ་བྱི་བ་ལོ་ (male Fire-Rat); 923 or 542 or −230 — to — མེ་མོ་གླང་ལོ་ (female Fire-Ox); 924 or 543 or −229

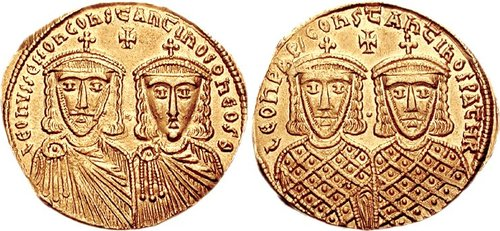
Gold solidus of Constantine VI and Leo IV

Year 797 (DCCXCVII) was a common year starting on Sunday of the Julian calendar. The denomination 797 for this year has been used since the early medieval period, when the Anno Domini calendar era became the prevalent method in Europe for naming years.

== Events ==
=== By place ===
==== Byzantine Empire ====
- April 19 or August 19 – Empress Irene organizes a conspiracy against her son Constantine VI. He is captured and blinded; Irene exiles him to Principo, where he dies shortly thereafter of his wounds. Irene begins a 5-year reign, and calls herself basileus ("emperor") of the Byzantine Empire. (Sources and historians conflict on whether this was in April or August.)

==== Europe ====
- King Charlemagne issues the Capitulare Saxonicum, making Westphalian, Angrian and Eastphalian Saxons equal to other peoples in the Frankish Kingdom. The Nordalbian Saxons revolt; a Frankish fleet is sent to the North Sea coast of Germany. It lands in Hadeln, a marshy coastal region between the Weser and Elbe estuaries, near modern-day Cuxhaven. Charlemagne invades northern Saxony, and again accepts the submission of the Saxons.

==== Britain ====
- Battle of Rhuddlan: Welsh forces, including those of Powys and Dyfed, clash with Mercians. King Coenwulf tries to re-assert his domination of northeast Wales. King Caradog ap Meirion of Gwynedd is killed during the fighting (approximate date).

== Births ==
- Bernard of Italy, king of the Lombards (d. 818)
- Ignatius I, patriarch of Constantinople (or 798)
- Judith of Bavaria, Frankish empress (or 805)
- Meinrad of Einsiedeln, German hermit (d. 861)
- Pepin I of Aquitaine, king of Aquitaine (d. 838)
- Shinshō, Japanese Buddhist monk (d. 873)

== Deaths ==
- February 6 – Donnchad Midi, High King of Ireland
- Æthelberht of Whithorn, Anglo-Saxon bishop
- Abd Allah ibn al-Mubarak, scholar and theologian
- Al-Hasan ibn Qahtaba, Muslim military leader
- Bermudo I, king of Asturias (approximate date)
- Caradog ap Meirion, king of Gwynedd (approximate date)
- Constantine VI, emperor of the Byzantine Empire (b. 771)
- Cummascach mac Fogartaig, king of South Brega
- Guan Bo, chancellor of the Tang Dynasty (b. 719)
- Muireadhach mac Olcobhar, Irish abbot
