= 798 =

Calendar year

798 in various calendars
Gregorian calendar	798; DCCXCVIII
Ab urbe condita	1551
Armenian calendar	247; ԹՎ ՄԽԷ
Assyrian calendar	5548
Balinese saka calendar	719–720
Bengali calendar	204–205
Berber calendar	1748
Buddhist calendar	1342
Burmese calendar	160
Byzantine calendar	6306–6307
Chinese calendar	丁丑年 (Fire Ox); 3495 or 3288 — to — 戊寅年 (Earth Tiger); 3496 or 3289
Coptic calendar	514–515
Discordian calendar	1964
Ethiopian calendar	790–791
Hebrew calendar	4558–4559
- Hindu calendars
Vikram Samvat	854–855
Shaka Samvat	719–720
Kali Yuga	3898–3899
Holocene calendar	10798
Iranian calendar	176–177
Islamic calendar	181–182
Japanese calendar	Enryaku 17 (延暦１７年)
Javanese calendar	693–694
Julian calendar	798; DCCXCVIII
Korean calendar	3131
Minguo calendar	1114 before ROC 民前1114年
Nanakshahi calendar	−670
Seleucid era	1109/1110 AG
Thai solar calendar	1340–1341
Tibetan calendar	མེ་མོ་གླང་ལོ་ (female Fire-Ox); 924 or 543 or −229 — to — ས་ཕོ་སྟག་ལོ་ (male Earth-Tiger); 925 or 544 or −228

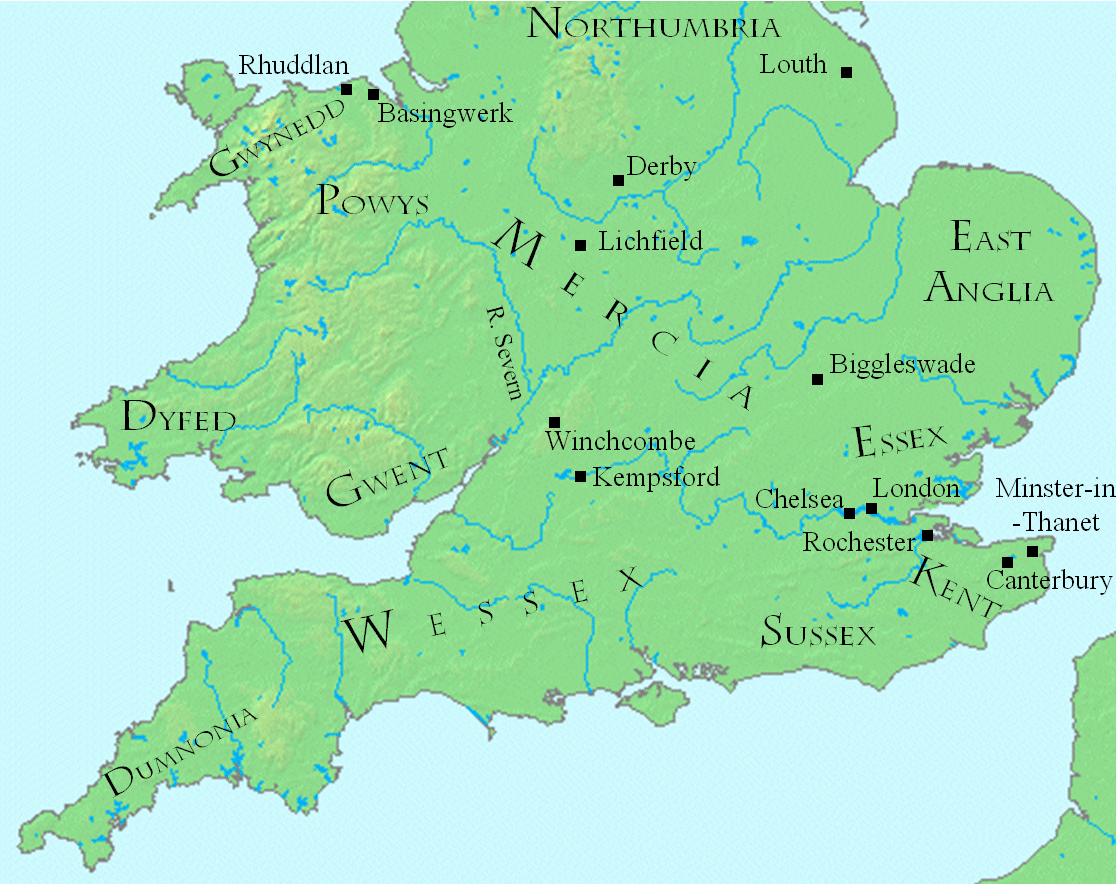
King Coenwulf of Mercia conquers Kent

Year 798 (DCCXCVIII) was a common year starting on Monday of the Julian calendar, the 798th year of the Common Era (CE) and Anno Domini (AD) designations, the 798th year of the 1st millennium, the 98th year of the 8th century, and the 9th year of the 790s decade. The denomination 798 for this year has been used since the early medieval period, when the Anno Domini calendar era became the prevalent method in Europe for naming years.

== Events ==
=== By place ===
==== Europe ====
- Battle of Bornhöved: King Charlemagne forms an alliance with the Obodrites. Together with Prince Drożko (Thrasco), he defeats the Nordalbian Saxons near the village of Bornhöved (modern-day Neumünster), obliging these 'northerners' to submit and give hostages against their future good behavior. In the coming years they are granted areas of present-day Hamburg.
- King Charles the Younger, a son of Charlemagne, conquers Corsica and Sardinia (approximate date).

==== Britain ====
- King Coenwulf of Mercia invades Gwynedd (modern Wales), and kills his rival Caradog ap Meirion during the fighting in Snowdonia. Kings Cynan and Hywel retake the throne. Coenwulf also defeats and captures King Eadberht Præn of Kent. He is blinded and his hands are cut off. He introduces his brother Cuthred as a sub-king of Kent (approximate date).
- Battle of Billington: King Eardwulf of Northumbria defeats the nobleman Wada in battle, who has killed former King Æthelred I (see 796).
- King Sigeric I of Essex abdicates and departs for a pilgrimage to Rome. He is succeeded by his son Sigered.

==== Iberia ====
- King Alfonso II of Asturias campaigns against the Arab Muslims in Al-Andalus. With Frankish military support, he raids into Andalusia and sacks Lisbon (modern Portugal).
- Bahlul ibn Marzuq, a Vascon-Muslim military leader, revolts in Zaragoza against the Arab-Muslim government of Al-Andalus.

=== By topic ===
==== Religion ====
- Alcuin, Anglo-Saxon monk and scholar, writes to his friend, the exiled king Osbald of Northumbria, in order to dissuade him.
- Theodulf, Frankish poet, is appointed bishop of Orléans. He becomes one of Charlemagne's favoured theologians.

== Births ==
- Abdallah ibn Tahir, Muslim governor (approximate date)
- Babak Khorramdin, Persian military leader (approximate date)
- Ignatius I, patriarch of Constantinople (approximate date)

== Deaths ==
- Abu Yusuf, Muslim jurist and chief adviser
- Caradog ap Meirion, king of Gwynedd (or 797)
- Lu Mai, chancellor of the Tang Dynasty (b. 739)
- Wonseong, king of Silla (Korea)
