= 794 =

Calendar year

794 in various calendars
| Gregorian calendar | 794; DCCXCIV |
| Ab urbe condita | 1547 |
| Armenian calendar | 243; ԹՎ ՄԽԳ |
| Assyrian calendar | 5544 |
| Balinese saka calendar | 715–716 |
| Bengali calendar | 200–201 |
| Berber calendar | 1744 |
| Buddhist calendar | 1338 |
| Burmese calendar | 156 |
| Byzantine calendar | 6302–6303 |
| Chinese calendar | 癸酉年 (Water Rooster); 3491 or 3284 — to — 甲戌年 (Wood Dog); 3492 or 3285 |
| Coptic calendar | 510–511 |
| Discordian calendar | 1960 |
| Ethiopian calendar | 786–787 |
| Hebrew calendar | 4554–4555 |
- Hindu calendars
| Vikram Samvat | 850–851 |
| Shaka Samvat | 715–716 |
| Kali Yuga | 3894–3895 |
| Holocene calendar | 10794 |
| Iranian calendar | 172–173 |
| Islamic calendar | 177–178 |
| Japanese calendar | Enryaku 13 (延暦１３年) |
| Javanese calendar | 689–690 |
| Julian calendar | 794; DCCXCIV |
| Korean calendar | 3127 |
| Minguo calendar | 1118 before ROC 民前1118年 |
| Nanakshahi calendar | −674 |
| Seleucid era | 1105/1106 AG |
| Thai solar calendar | 1336–1337 |
| Tibetan calendar | ཆུ་མོ་བྱ་ལོ་ (female Water-Bird); 920 or 539 or −233 — to — ཤིང་ཕོ་ཁྱི་ལོ་ (male Wood-Dog); 921 or 540 or −232 |

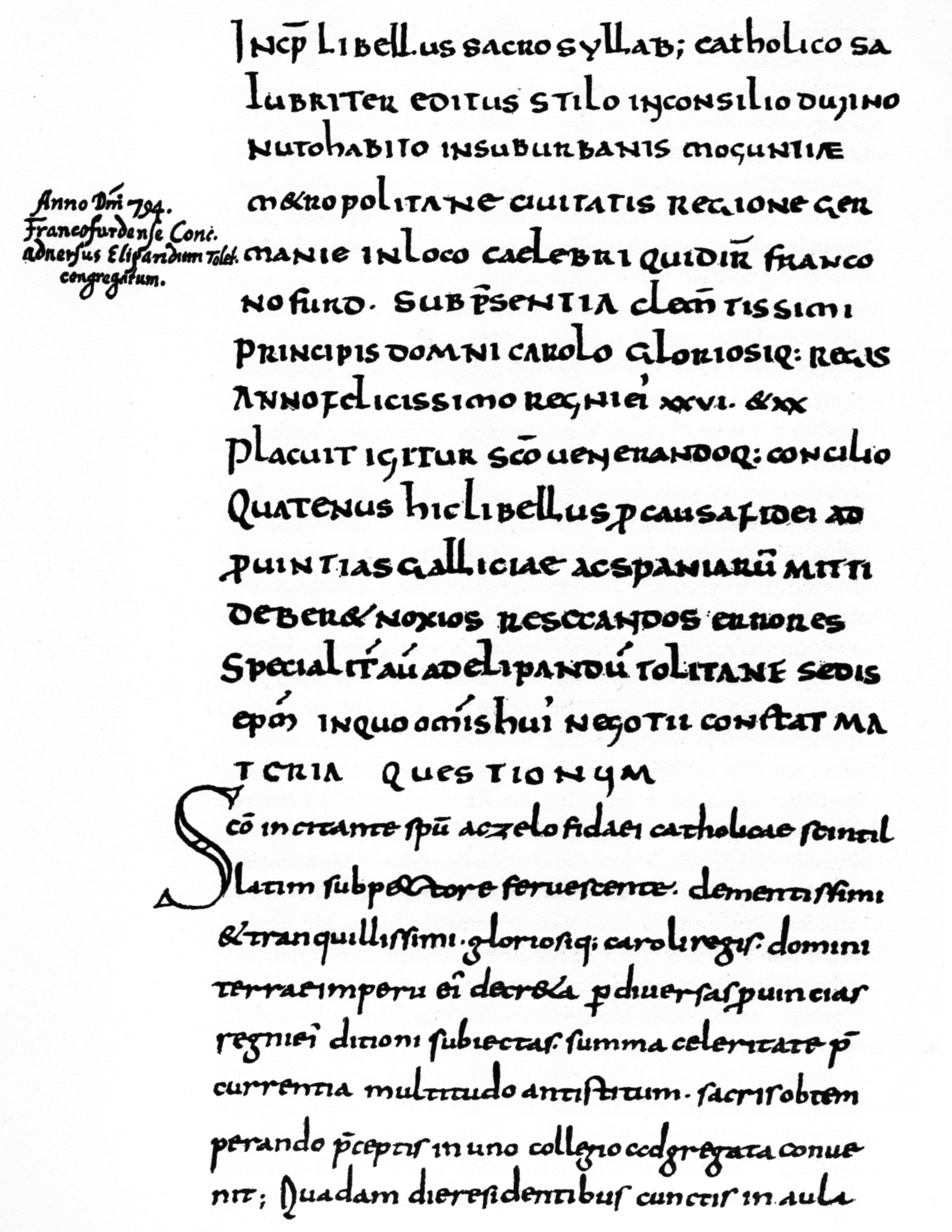
Mention of the Council of Frankfurt (794)

Year 794 (DCCXCIV) was a common year starting on Wednesday of the Julian calendar, the 794th year of the Common Era (CE) and Anno Domini (AD) designations, the 794th year of the 1st millennium, the 94th year of the 8th century, and the 5th year of the 790s decade. The denomination 794 for this year has been used since the early medieval period, when the Anno Domini calendar era became the prevalent method in Europe for naming years.

== Events ==
=== By place ===
==== Europe ====
- King Charlemagne abandons his channel project (see 793), and attacks the Saxon rebels from the north, supported by a second Frankish army under his son Charles the Younger, which crosses the Rhine at Cologne from the west; threatened from two directions, the Saxons surrender near Paderborn (Westphalia).
- August 10 – Queen Fastrada, third wife of Charlemagne, dies in Frankfurt after 11 years of marriage. Charlemagne consoles himself with Luitgard, an Alemannian noblewoman, whom he marries and moves into his new palace at Aachen (Germany). Luitgard shares Charlemagne's interest in the liberal arts.
- King Louis I (son of Charlemagne), age 16, marries Ermengarde of Hesbaye. She is a Frankish noblewoman and the daughter of Ingerman, count of Hesbaye (modern Belgium).

==== Britain ====
- May 20 – King Æthelberht II of East Anglia visits the royal Mercian court at Sutton Walls (Herefordshire), with a view to marrying Princess Ælfthryth. He is taken captive and beheaded, on the orders of King Offa.
- Vikings sack the Monkwearmouth–Jarrow Abbey in Northumbria (the second monastery target in England of the Vikings, after the raids on Lindisfarne in 793).

==== Asia ====
- Kyoto becomes the Japanese capital, ending the Nara period, and beginning the Heian period; a Golden Age of Japanese culture begins that will endure under the domination of the Fujiwara, Minamoto, Tachibana and Taira families, until 1185.

=== By topic ===
==== Communication ====
- A paper mill begins production at Baghdad during the Abbasid era, as the Arabs spread the techniques developed by Chinese papermakers. Baghdad becomes a great seat of learning, with Christian and Jewish scholars as well as Muslims, while Europe remains largely unlettered. The Arabs will become the world's most proficient papermakers.

==== Religion ====
- Council of Frankfurt: King Charlemagne calls for a church meeting of the Frankish realm. Bishops and priests from Francia, Aquitaine, Italy, and Provence are gathered in Franconofurd (modern-day Frankfurt am Main).

== Births ==
- Arnulf of Sens, Frankish nobleman (or 793)
- Du Cong, chancellor of the Tang Dynasty

== Deaths ==
- May 20 – Æthelberht II, king of East Anglia
- August 10 – Fastrada, Frankish queen consort (b. 765)
- Solus, Anglo-Saxon missionary and saint (approximate date)
