= 873 =

Calendar year

873 in various calendars
Gregorian calendar	873; DCCCLXXIII
Ab urbe condita	1626
Armenian calendar	322; ԹՎ ՅԻԲ
Assyrian calendar	5623
Balinese saka calendar	794–795
Bengali calendar	279–280
Berber calendar	1823
Buddhist calendar	1417
Burmese calendar	235
Byzantine calendar	6381–6382
Chinese calendar	壬辰年 (Water Dragon); 3570 or 3363 — to — 癸巳年 (Water Snake); 3571 or 3364
Coptic calendar	589–590
Discordian calendar	2039
Ethiopian calendar	865–866
Hebrew calendar	4633–4634
- Hindu calendars
Vikram Samvat	929–930
Shaka Samvat	794–795
Kali Yuga	3973–3974
Holocene calendar	10873
Iranian calendar	251–252
Islamic calendar	259–260
Japanese calendar	Jōgan 15 (貞観１５年)
Javanese calendar	771–772
Julian calendar	873; DCCCLXXIII
Korean calendar	3206
Minguo calendar	1039 before ROC 民前1039年
Nanakshahi calendar	−595
Seleucid era	1184/1185 AG
Thai solar calendar	1415–1416
Tibetan calendar	阳水龙年 (male Water-Dragon); 999 or 618 or −154 — to — 阴水蛇年 (female Water-Snake); 1000 or 619 or −153

Year 873 (DCCCLXXIII) was a common year starting on Thursday of the Julian calendar.

== Events ==
=== By place ===
==== Europe ====
- Carloman, son of King Charles the Bald, is hauled before a secular court and condemned to death – for plotting against his father. He is blinded, but avoids imprisonment by escaping to the East Frankish Kingdom, where his uncle, Louis the German, gives him protection.
- Al-Andalus: The city of Toledo (modern Spain) rises up for a second time against Umayyad rule, due to ethnic tensions over two years.

==== Britain ====
- The Danish Great Heathen Army, led by the Viking leaders Halfdan and Guthrum, attack Mercia and capture the royal centre at Repton (Derbyshire). The Vikings establish an encampment with a U-shape ditch, on the south bank of the River Trent and spend the winter there.

==== Abbasid Caliphate ====
- Azugitin, Abbasid caliph Al-Mu'tamid appointed Azugitin as governor of Mosul with deputies.
- Muhammad ibn Ali al-Armani, was killed at the Caliphate - Byzantine border in 873.
- Muhammad ibn Tahir, Muslim governor of Khorasan, is overthrown by the Saffarids, led by Ya'qub ibn al-Layth, who conquer the capital, Nishapur. Khorasan is annexed to their own empire in eastern Persia. The Tahirid Dynasty falls.

==== China ====
- August 15 – Emperor Yi Zong (Li Cuī) dies after a 13-year reign. He is succeeded by his 11-year-old son Xi Zong, as ruler of the Tang Dynasty. During his reign, a widespread failure of the agricultural harvest leads to famine (which causes people to resort to cannibalism) and agrarian rebellions.

== Births ==
- Abdullah al-Mahdi Billah, was the founder of the Isma'ili Fatimid Empire, the only major Shi'a caliphate in the 10th century history, and the eleventh Imam of the Isma'ili faith (d. 934)
- Abu Yazid, Kharijite Berber leader (d. 947)
- Ahmad al-Muhajir, Muslim imam (d. 956)
- Al-Tabarani, Muslim hadith scholar (d. 970)
- Fujiwara no Sadakata, Japanese poet (d. 932)
- Ordoño II, king of Galicia and León (d. 924)

== Deaths ==
- July 8 – Gunther, archbishop of Cologne
- August 1 – Thachulf, duke of Thuringia
- August 15 – Yi Zong, emperor of the Tang Dynasty (b. 833)

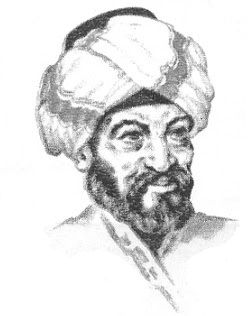
Death of Al-Kindi. He was an Arab Muslim philosopher, polymath, mathematician, physician and musician. Al-Kindi was the first of the Islamic peripatetic philosophers, and is hailed as the "father of Arab philosophy

- Al-Kindi, Muslim philosopher and polymath
- Du Cong, chancellor of the Tang Dynasty (b. 794)
- Ecgberht I, king of Northumbria
- Hunayn ibn Ishaq, Muslim scholar and physician (b. 809)
- Ivar the Boneless, Viking leader (approximate date)
- John III, Syriac Orthodox patriarch of Antioch
- Kang Chengxun, general of the Tang Dynasty
- Lethlobar mac Loingsig, king of Ulaid (Ireland)
- Malik ibn Tawk, Muslim governor
- Muhammad ibn Ali al-Armani, Muslim general
- Rodrigo, Asturian nobleman
- Rodulf Haraldsson, Viking leader
- Shinshō, Japanese Buddhist monk (b. 797)
- Vímara Peres, Asturian nobleman
- Wei Baoheng, chancellor of the Tang Dynasty
