= 858 =

Calendar year

858 in various calendars
Gregorian calendar	858; DCCCLVIII
Ab urbe condita	1611
Armenian calendar	307; ԹՎ ՅԷ
Assyrian calendar	5608
Balinese saka calendar	779–780
Bengali calendar	264–265
Berber calendar	1808
Buddhist calendar	1402
Burmese calendar	220
Byzantine calendar	6366–6367
Chinese calendar	丁丑年 (Fire Ox); 3555 or 3348 — to — 戊寅年 (Earth Tiger); 3556 or 3349
Coptic calendar	574–575
Discordian calendar	2024
Ethiopian calendar	850–851
Hebrew calendar	4618–4619
- Hindu calendars
Vikram Samvat	914–915
Shaka Samvat	779–780
Kali Yuga	3958–3959
Holocene calendar	10858
Iranian calendar	236–237
Islamic calendar	243–244
Japanese calendar	Ten'an 2 (天安２年)
Javanese calendar	755–756
Julian calendar	858; DCCCLVIII
Korean calendar	3191
Minguo calendar	1054 before ROC 民前1054年
Nanakshahi calendar	−610
Seleucid era	1169/1170 AG
Thai solar calendar	1400–1401
Tibetan calendar	མེ་མོ་གླང་ལོ་ (female Fire-Ox); 984 or 603 or −169 — to — ས་ཕོ་སྟག་ལོ་ (male Earth-Tiger); 985 or 604 or −168

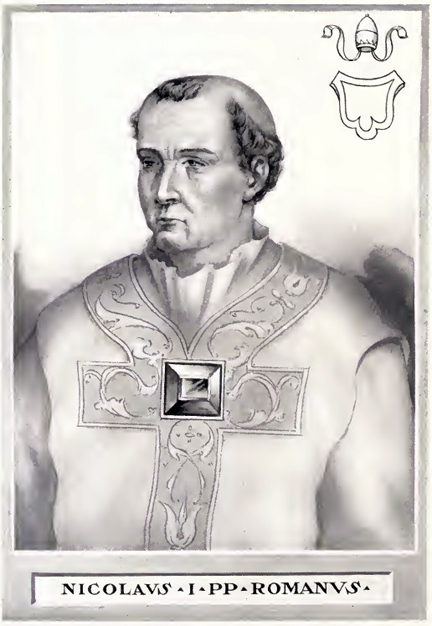
Pope Nicholas I (ca. 800–867)

Year 858 (DCCCLVIII) was a common year starting on Saturday of the Julian calendar.

== Events ==
=== By place ===
==== Europe ====
- Summer – King Louis the German, summoned by the disaffected Frankish nobles, invades the West Frankish Kingdom and secures Aquitaine for his nephew Pepin II ("the Younger"). King Charles the Bald flees to Burgundy; he is saved by the help of the bishops, and by the fidelity of the family of the Welfs, who are related to Judith (second wife of former emperor Louis the Pious).
- Viking raiders, led by Björn Ironside, set fire to the earliest church on the site of Chartres Cathedral. Charles the Bald pays him tribute (Danegeld) to save Verberie (Northern France).

==== Britain ====
- January 13 – King Æthelwulf of Wessex dies after an 18-year reign, and is succeeded by his eldest son Æthelbald. He marries his father's young widow Judith (daughter of Charles the Bald), and becomes sole ruler of Wessex. His brother, Æthelberht, is left to rule Kent and the south-east of England.
- February 13 – King Kenneth I (Cináed mac Ailpín), king of the Scots, dies after a 15-year reign in which he has been crowned at Scone, and united the various parts of Scotland with his native Dál Riata. His 46-year-old brother succeeds as Donald I, king of Alba.

==== Asia ====
- October 7 – Emperor Montoku dies after an 8-year reign. He is succeeded by his 8-year-old son Seiwa as the 56th emperor of Japan, with Fujiwara no Yoshifusa (Seiwa's grandfather) governing as regent and great minister of the Council of State.
- An enormous flood along the Grand Canal inundates thousands of acres of farmland and kills tens of thousands of people in the North China Plain.

=== By topic ===
==== Religion ====
- April 17 – Pope Benedict III dies after a 3-year reign, in which he has intervened in a political conflict between the sons of Emperor Lothair I. He is succeeded by Nicholas I, as the 105th pope of Rome.
- Synod of Quierzy: The bishops remain loyal to Charles the Bald during the invasion of his dominions by Louis the German. They address a conciliatory letter to Louis the German, which includes the False Decretals.
- October 23 – Ignatios I, patriarch of Constantinople, is imprisoned by orders of Emperor Michael III, and replaced by the layman Photius I.

== Births ==
- Al-Battani, Muslim astronomer and mathematician (d. 929)
- Cele Dabhaill mac Scannal, Irish abbot (d. 927)
- Gao Jixing, founder of Chinese Jingnan (d. 929)
- He Gui, general of Later Liang (d. 919)
- Lady Wu, wife of Qian Liu (d. 919)
- Liu Xun, general of Later Liang (d. 921)
- Mansur al-Hallaj, Persian mystic writer (d. 922)
- Niftawayh, Muslim scholar and grammarian (d. 935)
- Richard, duke of Burgundy (approximate date)
- Rudaki, Persian poet (approximate date)
- Tian Jun, Chinese warlord (d. 903)
- Zhang Juhan, official of Later Liang (d. 928)

== Deaths ==
- January 13 – Æthelwulf, king of Wessex
- February 13 – Kenneth I, king of Scotland (b. 810)
- April 17 – Benedict III, pope of the Catholic Church

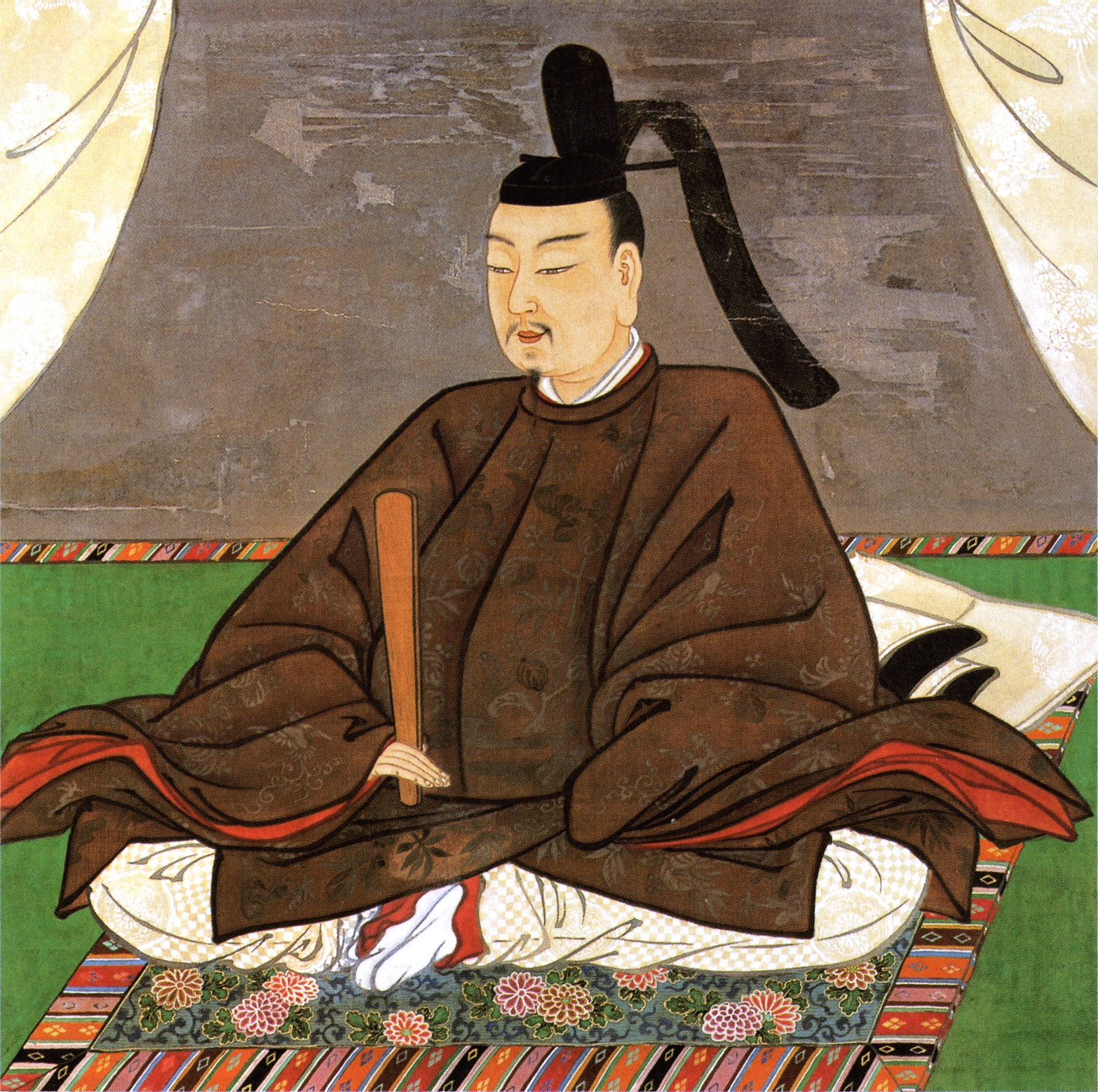
Emperor Montoku

- Leuthard II, Frankish count (or 869)
- Li Shangyin, Chinese official and poet
- Liu Zhuan, chancellor of the Tang dynasty (b. 796)
- Theodosius, patriarch of the Church of the East
- Wei Mo, chancellor of the Tang dynasty (b. 793)
