= 793 =

Calendar year

793 in various calendars
- Gregorian calendar: 793; DCCXCIII
- Ab urbe condita: 1546
- Armenian calendar: 242; ԹՎ ՄԽԲ
- Assyrian calendar: 5543
- Balinese saka calendar: 714–715
- Bengali calendar: 199–200
- Berber calendar: 1743
- Buddhist calendar: 1337
- Burmese calendar: 155
- Byzantine calendar: 6301–6302
- Chinese calendar: 壬申年 (Water Monkey); 3490 or 3283 — to — 癸酉年 (Water Rooster); 3491 or 3284
- Coptic calendar: 509–510
- Discordian calendar: 1959
- Ethiopian calendar: 785–786
- Hebrew calendar: 4553–4554
- Hindu calendars
- Vikram Samvat: 849–850
- Shaka Samvat: 714–715
- Kali Yuga: 3893–3894
- Holocene calendar: 10793
- Iranian calendar: 171–172
- Islamic calendar: 176–177
- Japanese calendar: Enryaku 12 (延暦１２年)
- Javanese calendar: 688–689
- Julian calendar: 793; DCCXCIII
- Korean calendar: 3126
- Minguo calendar: 1119 before ROC 民前1119年
- Nanakshahi calendar: −675
- Seleucid era: 1104/1105 AG
- Thai solar calendar: 1335–1336
- Tibetan calendar: ཆུ་ཕོ་སྤྲེ་ལོ་ (male Water-Monkey); 919 or 538 or −234 — to — ཆུ་མོ་བྱ་ལོ་ (female Water-Bird); 920 or 539 or −233

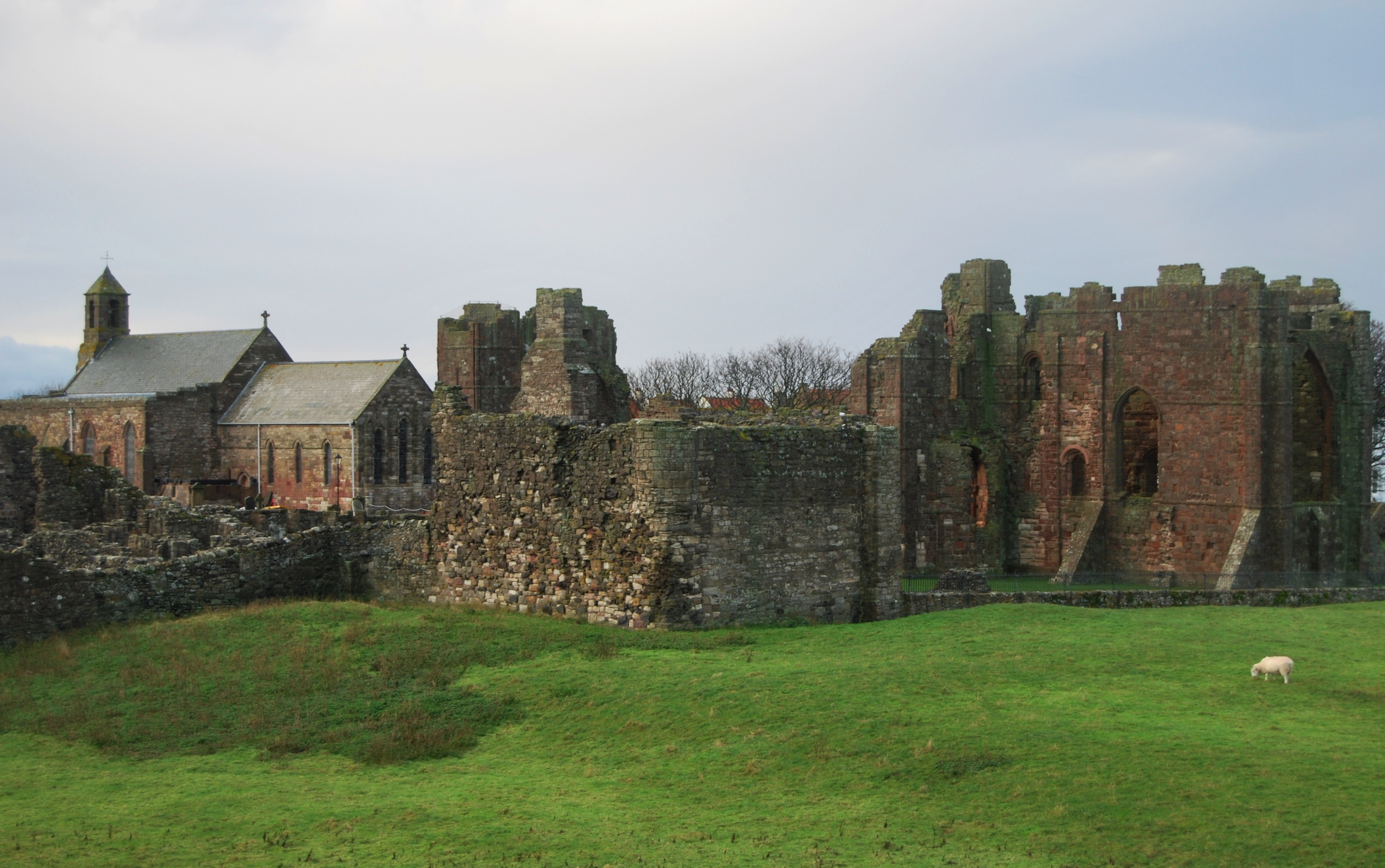
Ruins of Lindisfarne Abbey and St. Marys

Year 793 (DCCXCIII) was a common year starting on Tuesday of the Julian calendar. The denomination 793 for this year has been used since the early medieval period, when the Anno Domini calendar era became the prevalent method in Europe for naming years.

== Events ==
=== By place ===
==== Europe ====
- King Charlemagne orders a 3 kilometre long channel dug from Treuchtlingen to Weißenburg (the Rhine and Danube river basins), to improve the transportation of goods between the Rhineland and Bavaria. Charlemagne's son, Pepin of Italy, campaigns against the Lombards in Benevento (Southern Italy).
- Frisian–Frankish War: Count Theoderic is sent to Frisia, to muster troops for another offensive against the Avar Khaganate. He is attacked and probably killed by Saxon rebels, near the mouth of the Weser River. The Frisians revolt, and Charlemagne deports Saxon families from north of the river Elbe.

==== Britain ====
- June 8 – Viking raiders attack the Northumbrian coast, arriving in longships from either Denmark or Norway, and sacking the monastery of Lindisfarne. Many of the monks are killed or enslaved. It is the first Viking attack on a monastery in the British Isles, although it is not the first known Viking attack in the British Isles. The first attack came in 789, when Vikings raided the settlement of Portland in Dorset.

==== Arabian Empire ====
- Emir Hisham I of Córdoba calls for a jihad ("Holy War") against the Christian Franks. He assembles an army of 70,000 men, half of which attacks the Kingdom of Asturias, destroying its capital, Oviedo, while the other half invades Languedoc, penetrating as far as Narbonne. After capturing the city, the contingent moves towards Carcassonne and conquers it too. Both armies return to Córdoba enriched with the spoils of war.

=== By topic ===
==== Commerce ====
- Arab traders make Baghdad a financial center of the Silk Road between China and Europe. Caravans carry little or no money on their long journeys; Chinese traders use what they call fei qian (zh) ("flying money") to avoid robbery. The Arabs have adopted a similar banking system known as hawala to transmit funds (approximate date).

==== Religion ====
- August 17 – Quriaqos of Tagrit is consecrated Syriac Orthodox Patriarch of Antioch at Harran.
- King Offa of Mercia founds an abbey at St Albans.

== Births ==
- Arnulf of Sens, Frankish nobleman (or 794)
- Li Ning, prince of the Tang Dynasty (d. 812)
- Theophylact, Byzantine co-emperor (approximate date)
- Wei Mo, chancellor of the Tang Dynasty (d. 858)
- Wu Yuanji, general of the Tang Dynasty (or 783)
- Zhou Chi, chancellor of the Tang Dynasty (d. 851)

== Deaths ==
- February 22 – Sicga, Anglo-Saxon nobleman
- Idriss I, Muslim emir and founder of the Idrisid Dynasty (or 791)
