= 796 =

Calendar year

796 in various calendars
- Gregorian calendar: 796; DCCXCVI
- Ab urbe condita: 1549
- Armenian calendar: 245; ԹՎ ՄԽԵ
- Assyrian calendar: 5546
- Balinese saka calendar: 717–718
- Bengali calendar: 202–203
- Berber calendar: 1746
- Buddhist calendar: 1340
- Burmese calendar: 158
- Byzantine calendar: 6304–6305
- Chinese calendar: 乙亥年 (Wood Pig); 3493 or 3286 — to — 丙子年 (Fire Rat); 3494 or 3287
- Coptic calendar: 512–513
- Discordian calendar: 1962
- Ethiopian calendar: 788–789
- Hebrew calendar: 4556–4557
- Hindu calendars
- Vikram Samvat: 852–853
- Shaka Samvat: 717–718
- Kali Yuga: 3896–3897
- Holocene calendar: 10796
- Iranian calendar: 174–175
- Islamic calendar: 179–180
- Japanese calendar: Enryaku 15 (延暦１５年)
- Javanese calendar: 691–692
- Julian calendar: 796; DCCXCVI
- Korean calendar: 3129
- Minguo calendar: 1116 before ROC 民前1116年
- Nanakshahi calendar: −672
- Seleucid era: 1107/1108 AG
- Thai solar calendar: 1338–1339
- Tibetan calendar: ཤིང་མོ་ཕག་ལོ་ (female Wood-Boar); 922 or 541 or −231 — to — མེ་ཕོ་བྱི་བ་ལོ་ (male Fire-Rat); 923 or 542 or −230

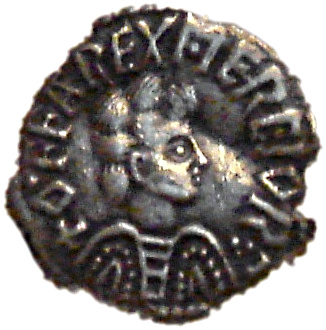
A coin depicting Offa of Mercia (757–796)

Year 796 (DCCXCVI) was a leap year starting on Friday of the Julian calendar, the 796th year of the Common Era (CE) and Anno Domini (AD) designations, the 796th year of the 1st millennium, the 96th year of the 8th century, and the 7th year of the 790s decade. The denomination 796 for this year has been used since the early medieval period, when the Anno Domini calendar era became the prevalent method in Europe for naming years.

== Events ==
=== By place ===
==== North America ====
- The Three Fires Confederacy is formed at Michilimackinac.

==== Europe ====
- King Charlemagne organizes an invasion of the Avar Khaganate, with one army under his son Pepin of Italy and another army under one of his vassals, the Croat Duke Vojnomir. The two armies launch a successful two-pronged invasion of the Avar Khaganate (modern Hungary). They seize the Avar "ring" (the nomadic tent capital), destroying Avar power before returning with so much booty in gold and jewels that 15 wagons, each drawn by four oxen, are needed to bring it back to Frankish territory. Charlemagne wins a major victory (in which the Lower Pannonian duke Vojnomir aids him), and the Franks make themselves overlords over the Croatians of northern Dalmatia, Slavonia, and Pannonia. Frankish missionaries are sent to the area to convert the pagan population to Christianity.

==== Britain ====
- April 18 – King Æthelred I of Northumbria is murdered, probably at Corbridge, by his ealdormen, Ealdred and Wada. Another rival, Torhtmund, slays Ealdred in revenge. Northumbria is plunged into chaos. The patrician Osbald is placed on the throne, but is deserted by his supporters after only 27 days. He flees from Lindisfarne to Pictland. Another faction brings back Æthelred I's old back-from-the-dead rival, Eardwulf, as the new king. He dismisses his wife and publicly takes a concubine. Eardwulf is alienated from Archbishop Eanbald of York.
- King Offa of Mercia and Charlemagne seal a trading agreement, and a marriage alliance is proposed. However, Offa dies after a 39-year reign, that has incorporated Kent, Essex, Sussex, and East Anglia into the Mercian realm. Offa is buried at Bedford, and succeeded for a short time by his son Ecgfrith, and then a distant cousin, Coenwulf.
- The Kingdom of Sussex again becomes independent from the Kingdom of Mercia following the death of King Offa.
- Prince Eadberht Præn leaves the Church, returns to Kent and claims his throne. Eadwald proclaims himself king of East Anglia, but is later ousted by Coenwulf. Direct rule from Mercia is re-established.

=== By topic ===
==== Religion ====
- Alcuin, Anglo-Saxon monk and scholar, is appointed as abbot by Charlemagne, who puts him in charge of leading Marmoutier Abbey in Tours.
- Tō-ji, a Buddhist temple of the Shingon sect, is established in Kyoto, Japan.

== Births ==
- Al-Mu'tasim, Muslim caliph (d. 842)
- Dhul-Nun al-Misri, Egyptian scholar and Sufi (d. 859)
- Ibrahim ibn Ya'qub al-Juzajani, Muslim hadith scholar
- Liu Zhuan, chancellor of the Tang Dynasty (d. 858)
- Lü Dongbin, Chinese scholar and poet
- Xiao Fang, chancellor of the Tang Dynasty (d. 875)

== Deaths ==
- April 18 – Æthelred I, king of Northumbria
- June 12 – Hisham I, Muslim emir (b. 757)
- July 29 – Offa, king of Mercia (b. 730)
- August 10 – Eanbald, archbishop of York
- Colla mac Fergusso, king of Connacht (Ireland)
- Ecgfrith, king of Mercia
- Fujiwara no Tsuginawa, Japanese statesman (b. 727)
- Muhammad ibn Ibrahim al-Fazari, Muslim philosopher (or 806)
- Sibawayh, Persian linguist and grammarian (b. 760)
- Tassilo III, duke of Bavaria (approximate date)
