= 783 =

Calendar year

783 in various calendars
- Gregorian calendar: 783; DCCLXXXIII
- Ab urbe condita: 1536
- Armenian calendar: 232; ԹՎ ՄԼԲ
- Assyrian calendar: 5533
- Balinese saka calendar: 704–705
- Bengali calendar: 189–190
- Berber calendar: 1733
- Buddhist calendar: 1327
- Burmese calendar: 145
- Byzantine calendar: 6291–6292
- Chinese calendar: 壬戌年 (Water Dog); 3480 or 3273 — to — 癸亥年 (Water Pig); 3481 or 3274
- Coptic calendar: 499–500
- Discordian calendar: 1949
- Ethiopian calendar: 775–776
- Hebrew calendar: 4543–4544
- Hindu calendars
- Vikram Samvat: 839–840
- Shaka Samvat: 704–705
- Kali Yuga: 3883–3884
- Holocene calendar: 10783
- Iranian calendar: 161–162
- Islamic calendar: 166–167
- Japanese calendar: Enryaku 2 (延暦２年)
- Javanese calendar: 678–679
- Julian calendar: 783; DCCLXXXIII
- Korean calendar: 3116
- Minguo calendar: 1129 before ROC 民前1129年
- Nanakshahi calendar: −685
- Seleucid era: 1094/1095 AG
- Thai solar calendar: 1325–1326
- Tibetan calendar: ཆུ་ཕོ་ཁྱི་ལོ་ (male Water-Dog); 909 or 528 or −244 — to — ཆུ་མོ་ཕག་ལོ་ (female Water-Boar); 910 or 529 or −243

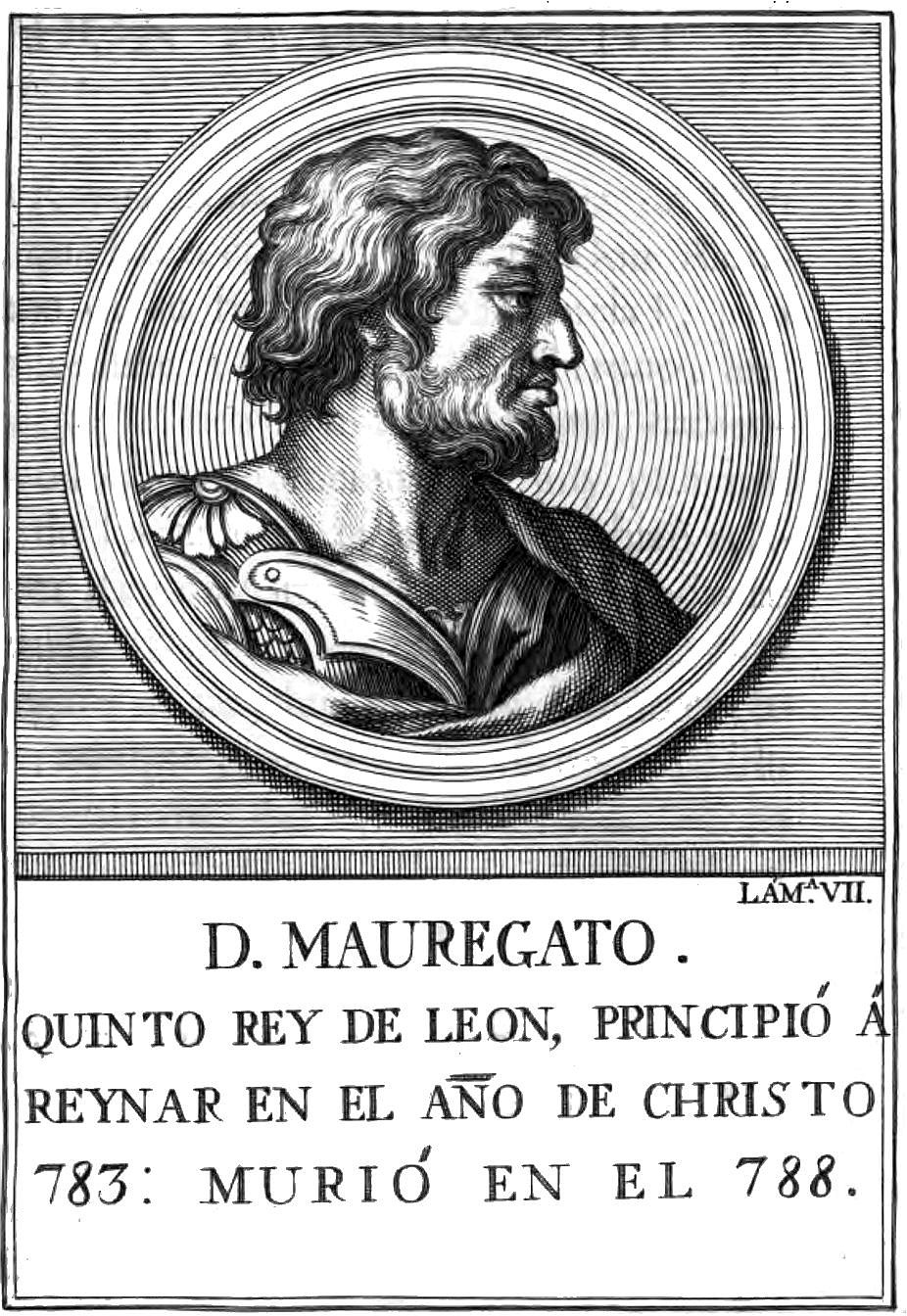
Mauregatus of Asturias (783–788)

Year 783 (DCCLXXXIII) was a common year starting on Wednesday of the Julian calendar. The denomination 783 for this year has been used since the early medieval period, when the Anno Domini calendar era became the prevalent method in Europe for naming years.

== Events ==
=== By place ===
==== Byzantine Empire ====
- A Byzantine expeditionary force under Staurakios, chief minister (logothete), begins a campaign against the communities (Sclaviniae) of Greece. Setting out from Constantinople, the imperial army follows the Thracian coast into Macedonia, and then south into Thessaly, Central Greece and the Peloponnese. Staurakios restores a measure of Byzantine authority over these areas, and collects booty and tribute from the locals.

==== Europe ====
- Mauregatus of Asturias, illegitimate son of the late king Alfonso I, usurps the throne after the death of his brother-in-law Silo. However, the nobility has elected Alfonso II at Adosinda's (wife of Silo) insistence, but Mauregatus assembles a large army of supporters, and forces Alfonso to flee to Álava (modern Spain). Adosinda is put in the monastery of San Juan de Pravia, where she lives out the rest of her life.
- April 30 – Hildegard, wife of King Charlemagne, dies in childbirth after her ninth confinement in less than 12 years of marriage. His mother, Bertrada of Laon, dies in the summer and is buried with great ceremony beside her husband Pepin the Short, in the Abbey of St. Denis (modern-day Paris).
- October – Charlemagne marries Fastrada, the 18-year-old daughter of a Frankish count named Rudolph, and makes her his queen at Worms. The probable reason behind the marriage is to solidify a Frankish alliance east of the Rhine, against the Saxons in Lower Saxony (modern Germany).
- Winter – Saxon Wars: Charlemagne defeats the Saxon rebels in a three-day battle next to the Hase River, and perhaps overruns fortifications on the Wittekindsberg, before ravaging southern Saxony. A Frisian uprising against Carolingian rule is supported by Duke Widukind.

== Births ==
- Wu Yuanji, general of the Tang Dynasty (or 793)

== Deaths ==
- April 30 – Hildegard, queen consort of Charlemagne (b. 758)
- July 12 – Bertrada of Laon, queen consort of Pepin the Short
- Cynewulf, bishop of Lindisfarne (approximate date)
- Fujiwara no Uona, Japanese minister (b. 721)
- Han Gan, Chinese painter of the Tang Dynasty
- Isa ibn Musa, Muslim governor (or 784)
- Silo, king of Asturias (Spain)
