= 851 =

Calendar year

851 in various calendars
Gregorian calendar	851; DCCCLI
Ab urbe condita	1604
Armenian calendar	300; ԹՎ Յ
Assyrian calendar	5601
Balinese saka calendar	772–773
Bengali calendar	257–258
Berber calendar	1801
Buddhist calendar	1395
Burmese calendar	213
Byzantine calendar	6359–6360
Chinese calendar	庚午年 (Metal Horse); 3548 or 3341 — to — 辛未年 (Metal Goat); 3549 or 3342
Coptic calendar	567–568
Discordian calendar	2017
Ethiopian calendar	843–844
Hebrew calendar	4611–4612
- Hindu calendars
Vikram Samvat	907–908
Shaka Samvat	772–773
Kali Yuga	3951–3952
Holocene calendar	10851
Iranian calendar	229–230
Islamic calendar	236–237
Japanese calendar	Kashō 4 / Ninju 1 (仁寿元年)
Javanese calendar	748–749
Julian calendar	851; DCCCLI
Korean calendar	3184
Minguo calendar	1061 before ROC 民前1061年
Nanakshahi calendar	−617
Seleucid era	1162/1163 AG
Thai solar calendar	1393–1394
Tibetan calendar	阳金马年 (male Iron-Horse); 977 or 596 or −176 — to — 阴金羊年 (female Iron-Goat); 978 or 597 or −175

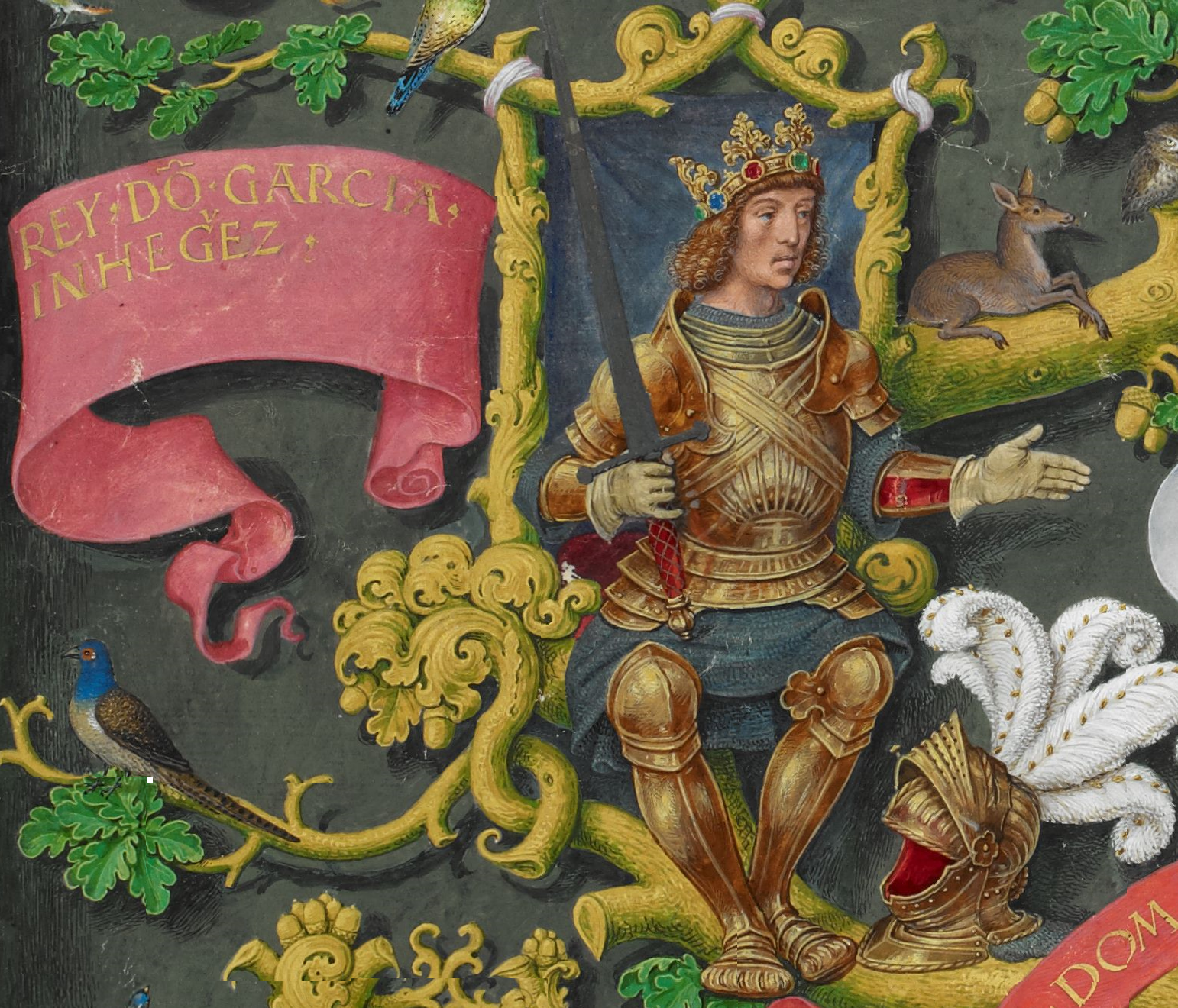
García Íñiguez of Pamplona (c. 805–870)

Year 851 (DCCCLI) was a common year starting on Thursday of the Julian calendar.

== Events ==
=== By place ===
==== Asia ====
- Bagrat II Bagratuni, Armenian prince and leader of a rebellion against the Abbasid Caliphate, is captured by the Abbasid army, and brought to the caliphal capital of Samarra.

==== Britain ====
- Danish Viking raiders enter the Thames Estuary, and plunder Canterbury and London. They land at Wembury near Plymouth, but are defeated by Anglo-Saxon forces led by King Ethelwulf of Wessex. His eldest son Æthelstan of Kent, accompanied by Ealdorman Ealhhere, attacks a Viking fleet off the coast at Sandwich, and captures nine of the enemy vessels while the remainder flees.

==== China ====
- Suleiman al-Tajir, Muslim merchant and traveller, visits China during the Tang Dynasty. He observes the manufacturing of Chinese porcelain at Guangzhou, and writes of his admiration for its transparent quality. Suleiman also describes the mosque at Guangzhou, its granaries, its local government administration, some of its written records, and the treatment of travellers, along with the use of ceramics, rice wine, and tea (approximate date).

==== Europe ====
- August 22 – Battle of Jengland: Duke Erispoe takes command of the Breton forces after his father Nominoe, king of Brittany, dies. He continues an offensive against the Franks in alliance with Lambert II of Nantes. In Ille-et-Vilaine near Grand-Fougeray (Brittany), Erispoe defeats a Frankish-Saxon army (4,000 men) led by King Charles the Bald.
- Treaty of Angers: Charles the Bald meets Erispoe in Angers, and acknowledges him as "king of Brittany". He recognizes the authority of Breton rule over the areas around Nantes, Rennes and Pays de Retz, which become part of the Breton March, a border zone. Erispoe takes the oath to Charles as king of the West Frankish Kingdom (but not an hommage lige which would be an allegiance). To mark the sovereignty of the Breton state, the future Dukes of Brittany are crowned as "Duke, king in their lands".
- September – King Pepin II of Aquitaine is captured by the forces of Count Sans II Sancion, and handed over to Charles the Bald. He is detained in the monastery of Saint Medard in Soissons.
- Emperor Lothair I meets with his (half) brothers Louis the German and Charles the Bald in Meerssen (modern-day Netherlands), to continue the system of "con-fraternal government".
- King Íñigo Arista of Pamplona dies after a 27-year reign. He is succeeded by his son García Íñiguez, as king of Pamplona (later Navarra).

=== By topic ===
==== Religion ====
- The Great Mosque of Samarra (modern Iraq) is completed during the reign of Caliph Al-Mutawakkil.

== Births ==
- Otto I, duke of Saxony (approximate date)

== Deaths ==
- March 7 – Nominoe, king (or duke) of Brittany
- March 20 – Ebbo, archbishop of Reims
- July 16 – Sisenandus, deacon and martyr
- Cináed mac Conaing, king of Brega (Ireland)
- Ermengarde of Tours, Frankish empress
- Íñigo Arista, king of Pamplona (or 852)
- Ishaq ibn Yahya ibn Mu'adh, Muslim governor
- Mor Frideborg, Swedish noblewoman
- Muhammad ibn Ishaq, Muslim governor
- Ólchobar mac Cináeda, king of Munster (Ireland)
- Radelchis I, prince (or duke) of Benevento
- Siconulf, prince of Salerno (approximate date)
- Vlastimir, prince of Serbia (approximate date)
- Zhou Chi, chancellor of the Tang Dynasty (b. 793)

== Sources ==
- Laurent, Joseph L. (1919). L'Arménie entre Byzance et l'Islam: depuis la conquête arabe jusqu'en 886 (in French). Paris: De Boccard.
- Ter-Ghewondyan, Aram (1976) [1965]. The Arab Emirates in Bagratid Armenia. Translated by Garsoïan, Nina. Lisbon: Livraria Bertrand. OCLC 490638192.
