= Mor Frideborg =

Mor Frideborg ('Mother Frideborg') or only Frideborg (died circa 851), was a Swedish woman in Birka when the first Christian mission arrived, led by Ansgar in 829-831. She is described in the Vita Ansgari.

== Life ==
Frideborg is described as an independent wealthy widow with an adult daughter, Katla. When Ansgar and his assistant Witmar arrived in Birka on their mission, she offered to house them, and they accepted her offer. They described her as a friendly and motherly figure who took good care of them. When Ansgar founded his church, the first Christian one in Sweden, Frideborg and the king's stewart Hergeir were his first converts. The congregation largely consisted of foreign slaves (thralls) who had already been Christians in their home countries.

Frideborg is described as famed for her piety; after her baptism, she reportedly decided to give her property to the poor. As there was no poverty in Birka, her gift had to be sent to poor people far away. The only possession Frideborg kept was reportedly enough wine to be given holy communion at her deathbed, which she asked Katla to keep. Soon afterward, in 831 Ansgar and Witmar left Sweden. Twenty years later, in 851, Ansgar sent the hermit Ardgar to Birka to give Frideborg and Hergier holy communion before their deaths. Reportedly, they both died soon after.

According to another version of this story, Frideborg had her gifts distributed posthumously; upon her deathbed, she asked Katla to distribute her inheritance among the poor. Unable to find poor people in Birka, Katla travelled to Dorestad in Friesland, where she carried out her mother's wish. According to the Vita Ansgari, a miracle occurred afterward: she found that she had as much money in her purse after having given away her inheritance as she had had before.

There are theories that Frideborg was originally from Friesland. This would mean she was already Christian at the time of Ansgar's visit, and that her daughter thereby returned to her mother's birth country (if she did indeed visit Dorestad).

== Bibliography ==
- Heidenstam, Verner von, Svenskarna och deras hövdingar: berättelser för unga och gamla, Stockholm, 1908
- Erik Thyselius, Göran Lindblad, Vem är det?: Svensk biografisk handbok, Volym 20. P. A. Nordstedt and Söners., 1946
- Klintberg, Bengt af, Namnen i almanackan, 1. uppl., Norstedts ordbok, Stockholm, 2001
- Christensson, Jakob (red.), Signums svenska kulturhistoria. Medeltiden, Signum, Lund, 2004
- Från forntid och medeltid., Thule, Stockholm, 1939
- Nilsson, John, Kyrka och folk i Sverige. D. 1, Missionstid och medeltid, Stockholm, 1954
- Hallström, Gunnar, Mälaröarnas historia: en bok om forntid och medeltid, Bokförl. Mälaröarnas historia, Ekerö, 1969
