= Zhang Juhan =

Zhang Juhan (張居翰) (858-928), courtesy name Deqing (德卿), was a senior eunuch of the Chinese Five Dynasties and Ten Kingdoms period Later Tang state (and Later Tang's predecessor state Jin), serving as a chief of staff for Later Tang's founding emperor Li Cunxu.

== During Tang Dynasty ==
Zhang Juhan was born in 858, during the reign of Emperor Xuānzong of Tang, but it is not known where he was born or how he came to become a eunuch. Early in the Xiantong era of Emperor Xuānzong's son and successor Emperor Yizong of Tang (860-874), he was adopted by the eunuch Zhang Congmei (張從玫). (Therefore, it appeared likely that his original name was not Zhang.) Because Zhang Congmei was a eunuch official (director of the office of ladies in waiting), Zhang Juhan was able to, through that heritage, become a eunuch official as well. At one point, he served as the eunuch monitor of the army at Rong District (容管, headquartered in modern Yulin, Guangxi).

In 883, during the reign of Emperor Yizong's son and successor Emperor Xizong, Zhang Juhan was recalled from Rong District to serve as an assistant at the Hall of Imperial Scholars (學士院, Xueshiyuan). He was subsequently made an assistant to the directors of palace communications (樞密承旨, Xumi Chengzhi), as well as the director of office of palace treasury (內府令, Neifu Ling).

During the time that Emperor Xizong's younger brother and successor Emperor Zhaozong was in exile at Hua Prefecture (華州, in modern Weinan, Shaanxi) — i.e., from 896 to 898 — he gave Zhang the greater title of Zhong Changshi (中常侍) and sent him to Lulong Circuit (盧龍, headquartered in modern Beijing), to serve as Lulong's eunuch monitor. Later, when Emperor Zhaozong was set to summon Zhang back to the capital Chang'an, Lulong's military governor (Jiedushi) Liu Rengong submitted a petition that Zhang be kept at Lulong, and Zhang ended up staying at Lulong. In 903, when Emperor Zhaozong, then under control of the major warlord Zhu Quanzhong the military governor of Xuanwu Circuit (宣武, headquartered in modern Kaifeng, Henan), under the urging of both Zhu and Zhu's ally the chancellor Cui Yin, issued an edict for a general slaughter of eunuchs, Liu hid Zhang and executed an inmate in his stead, claiming that he had already executed Zhang.

In 906, Zhu launched a major attack on Liu's domain, attacking Yichang Circuit (義昌, headquartered in modern Cangzhou, Hebei), then governed by Liu's son Liu Shouwen. Liu Rengong sought aid from Li Keyong the military governor of Hedong Circuit (河東, headquartered in modern Taiyuan, Shanxi). Li agreed, but under the provision that Liu send troops to Hedong so that the Hedong and Lulong troops could jointly attack Zhaoyi Circuit (昭義, headquartered in modern Changzhi, Shanxi), which had fallen under Zhu's control at that time, to try to relieve the pressure on Yichang. Liu sent Zhang and the secretary Ma Yu (馬鬱) with an army to Hedong, to join the attack on Zhaoyi. After the campaign, however, Li kept Zhang and did not return him to Lulong. After Li captured Zhaoyi and put his adoptive nephew Li Sizhao in command of the circuit, Zhang was made the eunuch monitor of the Zhaoyi army, personally commanding the 3,000 soldiers from Lulong.

== During Jin ==
In 907, Zhu Quanzhong forced Emperor Zhaozong's son and successor Emperor Ai to yield the throne to him, ending Tang and starting a new Later Liang. Li Keyong and several other regional warlords (Li Maozhen, Wang Jian, and Yang Wo) refused to recognize the new regime, and effectively became independent rulers of their own domains — in Li Keyong's case, as Prince of Jin. Shortly after, Later Liang launched an army to put Zhaoyi's capital Lu Prefecture (潞州) under siege. Zhang Juhan aided Li Sizhao in defending the city, until (after Li Keyong's death early in 908) Li Keyong's son and successor Li Cunxu arrived to defeat the Later Liang army and lift the siege. After that battle, whenever Li Sizhao accompanied Li Cunxu on campaigns away from Zhaoyi, Zhang would be in charge of Zhaoyi in Li Sizhao's absence. It was said that every spring he encouraged the people to be attentive in growing vegetables and trees, and he did what he could to aid the farmers.

In 923, Li Cunxu was planning to declare himself emperor of a new Later Tang, and therefore summoned Zhang and the assistant to the military governor of Anyi (安義, i.e., Zhaoyi, changed to Anyi to observe naming taboo for Li Sizhao), Ren Huan, to his presence at Wei Prefecture (魏州, in modern Handan, Hebei). This act caused apprehension in the heart of Li Sizhao's son and successor Li Jitao, who had taken control of the circuit without the approval of Li Cunxu after Li Sizhao's death in battle. As he thought that Li Cunxu summoned Zhang and Ren to prepare to act against him, he thus submitted the circuit to Later Liang's emperor Zhu Zhen.

== During Later Tang ==
Shortly after, Li Cunxu declared himself emperor of Later Tang. He made Zhang, as well as Guo Chongtao, his chiefs of staff (Shumishi), but it was said that Guo had recommended Zhang in order to bypass Li Shaohong, causing Li Shaohong's resentment. Meanwhile, Zhang was said to be careful and not liking to be involved in disputes, so effectively, Guo made all of the important decisions. After Li Cunxu conquered Later Liang later in the year, he gave Zhang a grand general title and put him in charge of the eunuch bureau (內侍省, Neishi Sheng), but continue to have him serve as a chief of staff with Guo. During Li Cunxu's reign, the eunuchs had substantial involvement on policy decisions, but Guo (not a eunuch) continued to oversee the final policy decisions. Zhang continued to not engage himself in those decisions, for the most part.

By 926, the Later Tang realm was engulfed in various mutinies against Li Cunxu, partly caused by a famine and partly caused by the army's discontent after Li Cunxu killed Guo and Zhu Youqian on false suspicions of treason. Believing that Wang Zongyan (Wang Jian's son and successor), the emperor of the defunct state of Former Shu, which a Later Tang army under Guo's command had conquered in 925, who was then in the process of being transported to the Later Tang capital Luoyang, would create trouble, Li issued an edict ordering Wang's death, and further stated in the edict, "Wang Yan and his entire procession should be executed." Zhang reviewed the edict, and decided by his own to alter the edict to read, "Wang Yan and his entire family should be executed," thus saving more than 1,000 Former Shu officials and palace attendants accompanying Wang.

Later in the year, Li Cunxu was himself killed in a mutiny at Luoyang itself. His adoptive brother Li Siyuan, who had rebelled against him earlier, quickly arrived at Luoyang and took control, initially using the title of regent (although he would later claim imperial title himself). Shortly after Li Siyuan claimed the regent title, Zhang begged him for retirement, and Li Siyuan agreed. Zhang thereafter returned to Chang'an, and Li Siyuan gave his adoptive son Zhang Yangui (張延貴) an official position at Chang'an in order to have Zhang Yangui be able to attend to him. He died of illness in 928.

== Notes and references ==
- History of the Five Dynasties, vol. 72.
- New History of the Five Dynasties, vol. 38.
- Zizhi Tongjian, vols. 264, 272, 274, 275.
