= Guan Bo =

Chinese chancellor (719–797)

Guan Bo (關播) (719 – February 4, 797), courtesy name Wuyuan (務元), was an official of the Chinese Tang dynasty, serving as a chancellor during the reign of Emperor Dezong.

== Background ==
Guan Bo was born in 719, during the reign of Emperor Xuanzong. His family was from Wei Prefecture (衛州, in modern Puyang, Henan) and claimed ancestry from the late Han dynasty general Guan Yu. Late in Emperor Xuanzong's Tianbao era (742-756), Guan Bo passed the imperial examinations. During the subsequent reign of Emperor Xuanzong's son Emperor Suzong, when the general Deng Jingshan (鄧景山) served as the military governor (Jiedushi) of Huainan Circuit (淮南, headquartered in modern Yangzhou, Jiangsu), Deng invited Guan to serve as a secretary under him. Guan subsequently returned to the capital Chang'an to serve in the imperial guard corps, and then as You Bujue (右補闕), a low-level official at the legislative bureau of government (中書省, Zhongshu Sheng). He was said to be well-versed in philosophy and metaphysics, particularly Buddhist philosophy.

== During Emperor Daizong's reign ==
During the Dali era (767-779) of Emperor Suzong's son Emperor Daizong, Guan Bo had a close association with the imperial guard commander Wang Jiahe (王駕鶴) and Wang's wife, who was also named Guan. The chancellor Yuan Zai was displeased about this association, and he sent Guan Bo away from the capital, to serve as an officer at Henan Municipality (河南, i.e., the region of the eastern capital Luoyang). While at Henan, Guan acted as magistrate of several counties and was said to be capable in his governance. When Chen Shaoyou (陳少遊) later served as the governor of Zhedong Circuit (浙東, headquartered in modern Shaoxing, Zhejiang) and then Huainan Circuit, he invited Guan to serve as his secretary. He later acted as the prefect of Chu Prefecture (滁州, in modern Chuzhou, Anhui). When Li Lingyao (李靈曜) rebelled against imperial authority in 776 and seized nearby Biansong Circuit (汴宋, headquartered in modern Kaifeng, Henan), Chen was one of the generals commissioned against Li Lingyao, but as he commanded the troops against Biansong, the bandits in his own circuit were rampaging. Guan mobilized the prefectural militia to defend against the bandits, and also was said to be a simple but effective governor. After Yang Guan and Chang Gun became chancellors in 777 to replace Yuan, they recommended Guan to be Duguan Yuanwailang (都官員外郎), a low-level official at the ministry of justice (刑部, Xingbu).

== During Emperor Dezong's reign ==
Emperor Daizong died in 779 and was succeeded by his son Emperor Dezong. Early in Emperor Dezong's reign, there was a group of bandits who occupied caves in Hunan Circuit (湖南, headquartered in modern Changsha, Hunan), led by Wang Guoliang (王國良). Emperor Dezong sent Guan to try to persuade Wang to submit. Before Guan's departure, Emperor Dezong and he had a conversation in which Guan impressed Emperor Dezong with words about finding capable officials. Upon Guan's return from the mission, Emperor Dezong made him Bingbu Yuanwailang (兵部員外郎), a low-level official at the ministry of defense (兵部, Bingbu). He was then made the deputy mayor of Hezhong Municipality (河中, in modern Yuncheng, Shanxi).

In 781, Guan was recalled to Chang'an to serve as imperial attendant (給事中, Jishizhong). While serving at that post, he suggested that learned officials be put in charge of the various treasuries, which had previously been overseen by unlearned technicians; it was said that this change was followed later to the benefit of the state. He then served as deputy minister of justice (刑部侍郎, Xingbu Shilang). As Emperor Dezong's trusted chancellor Lu Qi viewed Guan as mild in temperament and easy to control, he repeatedly recommended Guan, who successively served as the minister of civil service affairs (吏部侍郎, Libu Shilang) and minister of justice (刑部尚書, Xingbu Shangshu).

In 782, with Lu then serving as the only chancellor but knowing that Emperor Dezong, by custom, would want to commission at least one more chancellor, he recommended Guan to be chancellor. Emperor Dezong thereafter made Guan Zhongshu Shilang (中書侍郎), the deputy head of the legislative bureau, and gave him the designation Tong Zhongshu Menxia Pingzhangshi (同中書門下平章事), making him a chancellor de facto. He also gave Guan the honorific title Yinqing Guanglu Daifu (銀青光祿大夫), made him an imperial scholar, and put him in charge of editing the imperial history. It was said, however, that Lu dominated the government, and Guan did not participate in the decision-making. On one occasion, when Emperor Dezong was meeting with the chancellors, Guan heard a proposal that he considered inappropriate, and was ready to rise and speak against it, Lu gave him a look that caused him to hesitate. After the meeting was over, Lu told him, "I recommended you, sir, because you are solemn and quiet. How would you dare to open your mouth and speak?" Thereafter, Guan rarely spoke.

It was also said, however, that Guan lacked judgment in the characters of others, and he endeared himself to a number of junior officials who bragged about their own abilities, including Li Yuanping (李元平), Tao Gongda (陶工達), Zhang Sun (張愻), and Liu Chengjie (劉承誡). With Li Xilie the military governor of Huaixi Circuit (淮西, headquartered in modern Zhumadian, Henan) then posturing against the imperial government, Guan repeatedly recommended Li Yuanping, who had particularly bragged about his military strategies and impressed Guan. Emperor Dezong thus made Li Yuanping the acting prefect of Ru Prefecture (汝州, in modern Pingdingshan, Henan), as Ru Prefecture was close to Huaixi Circuit. When Li Yuanping arrived there, he immediately began reinforcing the defenses — but not realizing that of the laborers that he hired, many were agents that Li Xilie had sent. When Li Xilie attacked, those laborers turned against Li Yuanping, causing Ru Prefecture to fall to Li Xilie. Li Xilie's soldiers seized Li Yuanping and took him to Li Xilie. Li Yuanping, when meeting Li Xilie in fear, could not control his own body, and he defecated and urinated involuntarily. Li Xilie responded, "How does that blind chancellor think lightly of me, that he sent you to try to defend against me!" When Guan heard that Li Yuanping was captured, he still believed that Li Yuanping would find some way to overthrow Li Xilie, even though none of his subordinates believed it. As a result of what happened to Li Yuanping, none of Guan's other associates were given important offices by Emperor Dezong.

In fall 783, soldiers from Jingyuan Circuit (涇原, headquartered in modern Pingliang, Gansu), at Chang'an to await deployment to the east, mutinied after not receiving awards that they believed they deserved. Emperor Dezong fled to Fengtian (奉天, in modern Xianyang, Shaanxi), initially taking only his family members and a small group of eunuchs and imperial guards with him. Lu and fellow chancellor Guan Bo, in the confusion, had to jump over the walls of the office of chancellors, located at the legislative bureau (中書省, Zhongshu Sheng), to catch up with Emperor Dezong. The Jingyuan soldiers supported the general Zhu Ci as their leader, and Zhu soon declared a new state of Qin as its emperor. He put Fengtian under siege. A Tang aid force, commanded by the generals Du Xiquan (杜希全), Dai Xiuyan (戴休顏), Shi Changchun (時常春), and Li Jianhui (李建徽), was approaching Fengtian and requesting imperial instructions on which way to advance into the city. Guan and the general Hun Jian suggested having the aid force march over Qianling — the hill containing the tomb of Emperor Dezong's ancestor Emperor Gaozong — so that they would have better tactical position. Lu, arguing that doing so was disrespectful, suggested having the aid force march through a valley, despite Hun's protestations that doing so would expose the aid force to catapult attacks by Qin forces. Emperor Dezong agreed with Lu, and subsequently, the aid force was ambushed and, after suffering heavy losses, was forced to withdraw without ever reaching Fengtian. After the major general Li Huaiguang arrived and saved Fengtian from falling, Li Huaiguang demanded the removals of Lu, Bai Zhizhen (白志貞), and Zhao Zan (趙贊) — demands that were supported by other officials — and Emperor Dezong was forced to agree. Subsequently, the popular sentiment also opined that Guan, as fellow chancellor to Lu during this disaster, should not be allowed to remain as chancellor, and Emperor Dezong made Guan the minister of justice (刑部尚書, Xingbu Shangshu) instead, no longer chancellor. Still, officials such as Wei Lun (韋倫) were distressed that Guan remained an important minister, and they wailed, "The chancellor was unable to plan and assist the emperor properly, leading to this situation, but he is allowed to still be minister. This is distressing."

After Zhu's rebellion was suppressed, in 788, Huige's Heguduolu Khan Yaoluoge Dunmohe, who had entered an alliance with Tang, requested permission to marry a Tang princess. Emperor Dezong agreed and sent Guan to escort Emperor Dezong's daughter Princess Xian'an to Huige (which was subsequently renamed Huigu) to marry the khan and to bestow the title of Changshoutianqin Khan (or Tianqin 天親 Khan, "related to heaven" in short) on Yaoluoge Dunmohe. Guan was said to be quiet and not lavish on the way, impressing the people of Huigu. After he returned, Emperor Dezong wanted to make him the minister of defense (兵部尚書, Bingbu Shangshu), but he declined on account of illness and offered to resign. Emperor Dezong made him an advisor to the crown prince Li Song, and allowed him to retire. After his retirement, Guan retained few servants and reduced his numbers of horses and wagons, and he spent his retirement in quietness. For this, he was respected by the officials. He died in 797 and was publicly mourned.
