= Fossa Carolina =

Canal in Germany

Coordinates: 48°59′02″N 10°55′18″E

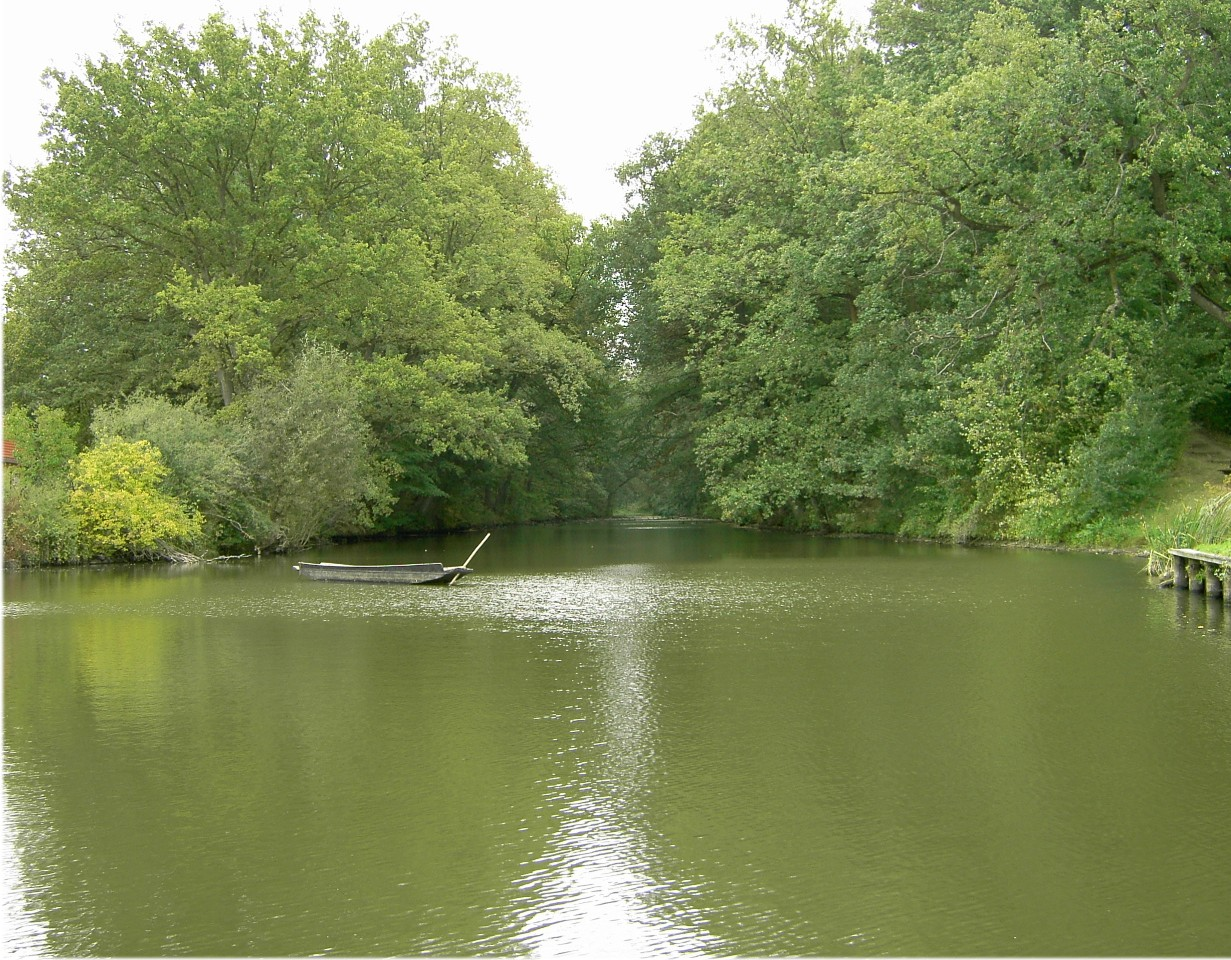
Remaining part of the Fossa Carolina

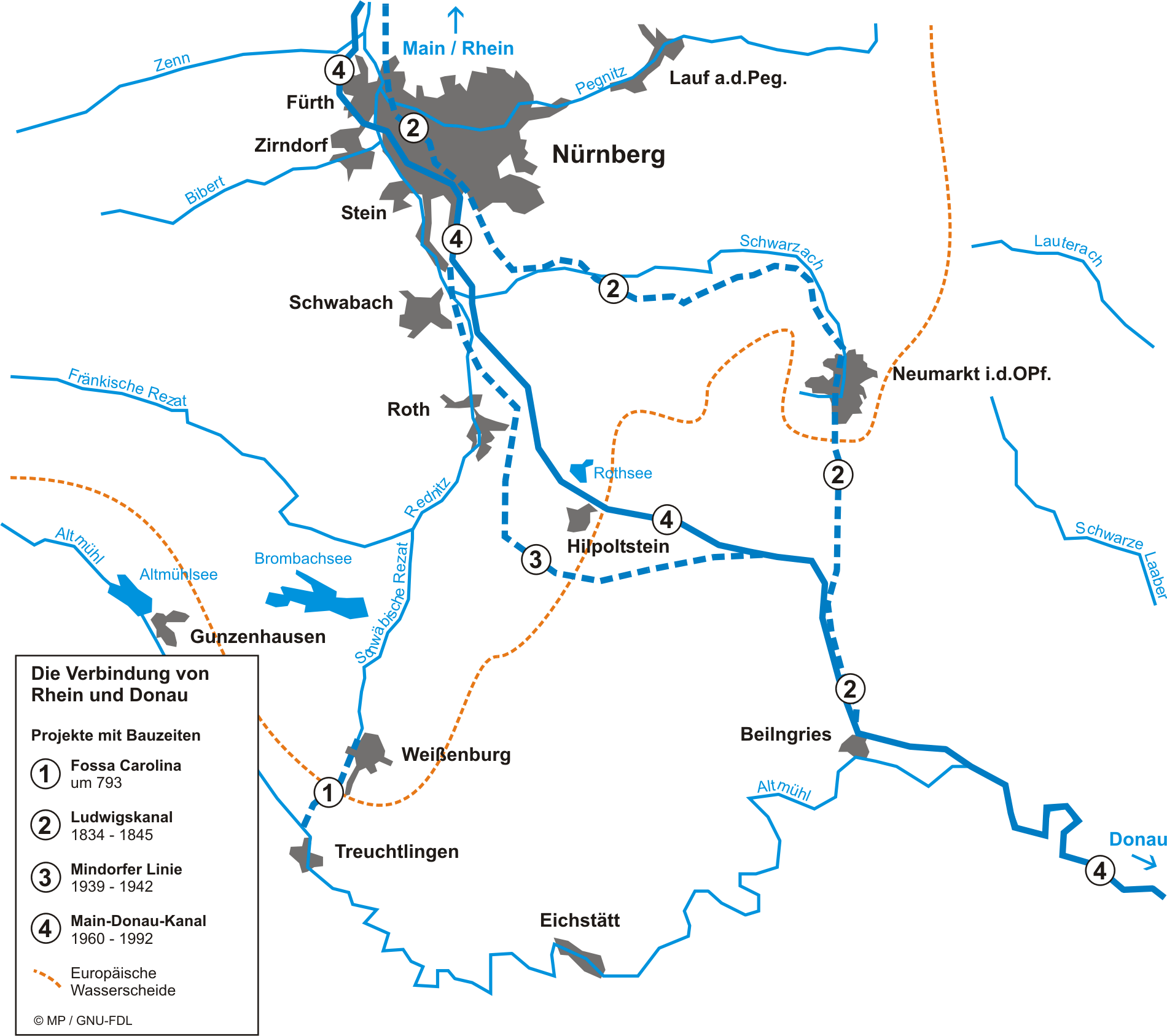
Map showing the Fossa Carolina canal

The Fossa Carolina (or Karlsgraben in German) was a canal named after Charlemagne in what is today the German state of Bavaria, intended to connect the Swabian Rezat river to the Altmühl river (the Rhine basin to the Danube basin). It was created during the early Middle Ages, long before the Ludwig Canal and the Rhine–Main–Danube Canal. If it was indeed operational, this canal would have been the first to link the Rhine basin to the Danube basin, across the European watershed. However, contemporary sources are contradictory as to whether it was ever finished or not.

== Geography ==
Near Treuchtlingen and Weißenburg in Bayern the European watershed between the rivers of the Rhine basin and those of the Danube basin is very narrow. Only around 2 km of fairly level terrain lie between the Swabian Rezat and the Altmühl.

== History ==
Carolingian sources report that Frankish king Charlemagne gave orders to dig a 2 kilometer long canal from Treuchtlingen to Weißenburg in Bayern in 793. According to Einhard, writing around two decades later, Charlemagne was convinced by "supposed experts" that it would be possible to travel in comfort by ship from Rhine to Danube if the Rezat could be linked to the Altmühl. The king assembled a large number of workers and in person supervised construction in the fall of 793 of a 2,000 step long and 300 feet wide moat. Einhard reports that the project failed due to the marshy ground and continuous rainfall, which caused excavated material to slide back.

But other sources indicate that it was in fact completed and fully operational. The canal may have worked with several ponds, dikes and dams.

It seems that the goal of this work was to improve the transportation of goods between the Rhineland and Bavaria. Another theory claims that the main purpose was to bring back Charlemagne's war vessels from the Danube to the Rhine.

In the 19th century, the project inspired king Ludwig I of Bavaria to build the Ludwig Canal, which opened in 1846.

== Research ==
Research by Robert Koch in 1992/3 showed that the floor of the canal was not level, but followed a step-like profile, rising from the direction of the Altmühl towards the north. Koch argued that the canal could have been flooded by damming the Rezat at Dettenheim and that the project could quite possibly have been finished. Geoarcheological work in 2009, however, showed that what had been considered an early medieval dam at Dettenheim was likely only built in the late Middle Ages and did not in fact serve to dam the Rezat.

A DFG research project at the site, started in 2012, is still ongoing. It is part of a project "Ports from Imperial Roman times to the early Middle Ages" and looks at what the original canal may have looked like - and if there are any indications of whether it ever actually linked the two rivers.

== Remains ==
Only a 500 m (1,600 ft) stretch of the canal in the municipality of Treuchtlingen in the Ortsteil known as Graben remains a water-filled waterway. Heaps of excavated earth that delineate the canal's banks stretch further, totalling around 1.2 km (0.75 mi); in places they rise up to 10 m (33 ft) in height. A 700 m (2,300 ft) waterless section to the north is also still visible in the landscape despite the earthworks being almost levelled.
