= Shinshō (Shingon) =

Japanese Buddhist monk (797–873)

Shinshō (真紹) (797–873) was a Japanese Buddhist monk of the Shingon sect and founder of the Eikan-dō Zenrin-ji in Heian-kyō (modern Kyoto).

He studied Vajrayana - or Esoteric - buddhism under Kūkai (Kōbō Daishi) at the Tō-ji and became the third master of Shingon in 843. Rising to a higher position in the Tō-ji in 847, he then founded the Eikan-dō Zenrin-ji in 853.
