= Arnulf of Sens =

Frankish noble, born 794

Arnulf of Sens (c.794 – April, 841) was a Frankish noble, an illegitimate son of Louis the Pious, son of Charlemagne. He had one sister, Alpaïs, abbess of Saint-Pierre-les-Dames, Reims.

Arnulf's grandfather, Charlemagne, died in 814 with his father Louis becoming emperor. Three years later in 817, Arnulf, was appointed count of Sens in Burgundy. He was the first son of Louis the Pious, but he did not inherit land because his birth was illegitimate. In April 841, a year after his father had died, he died at Sens.

== Sources ==
- McKitterick, Rosamond (2008). Charlemagne: The Formation of a European Identity. Cambridge University Press.
- Riche, Pierre (1993). The Carolingians: A Family who Forged Europe. Translated by Allen, Michael Idomir. University of Pennsylvania Press.
