= Liu Zhuan =

Liu Zhuan (劉瑑; 796 – June 20, 858), courtesy name Ziquan (子全), was an official of the Chinese Tang dynasty, who served briefly as a chancellor during the reign of Emperor Xuānzong.

== Background and early career ==
Liu Zhuan was born in 796, during the reign of Emperor Dezong. His family was from Pengcheng. and originally claimed ancestry from the Han dynasty prince Liu Kai (劉開) the Prince of Hejian, a son of Emperor Zhang of Han. Liu Zhuan was a fifth-generation descendant of the early Tang chancellor and general Liu Rengui; his grandfather Liu Fan (劉藩) served on the staff of a military governor (jiedushi), and his father Liu Wei (劉煟) served as a prefectural prefect.

Liu Zhuan passed the imperial examinations in the Jinshi class early in the Kaicheng era (836–840) of Emperor Dezong's great-great-grandson Emperor Wenzong. Subsequently, when the former chancellor Chen Yixing served as the prefect of Hua Prefecture (華州, in modern Weinan, Shaanxi), he invited Liu to serve as his assistant in his capacity as the commander of the Hua Prefecture-based Zhenguo Army (鎮國軍). Liu was later recalled to the capital Chang'an to serve as Zuo Shiyi (左拾遺), a low-level advisory official at the examination bureau of government (門下省, Menxia Sheng). It was said that he submitted many petitions advising Emperor Wenzong's brother and successor Emperor Wuzong against believing in the claims of Taoist alchemists. Late in Emperor Wuzong's Huichang era (841–846), he was put in charge of drafting edicts, and was also made Zhongshu Sheren (中書舍人), a mid-level official at the legislative bureau (中書省, Zhongshu Sheng).

== During Emperor Xuānzong's reign ==
Early in the Dazhong era (847–860) of Emperor Wuzong's uncle and successor Emperor Xuānzong, Liu Zhuan was made an imperial scholar (翰林學士, Hanlin Xueshi). At that time, Emperor Xuānzong was conducting a campaign to recover the territory that had been lost to Tufan decades earlier, and there were numerous campaign-related edicts to be issued, sometimes numbering tens each night. It was said that Liu, while drafting them, was able to use appropriate language despite the large volumes he needed to draft. In 850, during a campaign against the Dangxiang, he was made the monitor of the troops against the Dangxiang.

After his return from the Dangxiang campaign, Liu was made the deputy minister of justice (刑部侍郎, Xingbu Shilang). While serving that role, he collected a large number of edicts that could be used as precedents for rulings, on 2,865 matters, into a collection titled the Collection of Precedents for Dazhong Laws (大中刑律統類), and it was said that legal scholars applauded the collection for its completeness. Liu later served as the mayor of Henan Municipality (河南, i.e., the region of the eastern capital Luoyang), and then the military governor of Xuanwu Circuit (宣武, headquartered in modern Kaifeng, Henan). It was customary at that time that there would be dancing women at feasts that governors held for the soldiers, but Liu considered it inappropriate for a military feast; he thus selected a group of 1,000 soldiers and trained them in the use of spears and shields, and had them serve as the ceremonial dancers. He also ended the night curfew for the people so that the people could be convenienced. It was said that the region was peaceful while he governed it. He was later transferred to Hedong Circuit (河東, headquartered in modern Taiyuan, Shanxi). Soon thereafter, he was recalled to Chang'an to serve as the deputy minister of census (戶部侍郎, Hubu Shilang) and the director of finances. It was said that because Emperor Xuānzong had respected Liu greatly, he personally wrote the edict recalling Liu, such that Liu's departure from Hedong Circuit came as a complete surprise to his staff and others.

In early 858, Emperor Xuānzong gave Liu the designation Tong Zhongshu Menxia Pingzhangshi (同中書門下平章事), making him a chancellor de facto. After Liu was made chancellor, there was an occasion when his chancellor colleague Cui Shenyou, when discussing the policy priorities of the time with Emperor Xuānzong, mentioned that he wanted to make distinguishing officials' ancestries a top priority. Liu sharply disagreed and pointed out that the priorities should be to make sure that the officials' talents were appropriate for their positions, and Cui was unable to respond.

Liu, however, would only serve several months as chancellor before he fell seriously ill. Even when he fell ill, he was still writing policy suggestions to Emperor Xuānzong. After he died on June 20, 858, Emperor Xuānzong was saddened. He was given posthumous honors.

== Notes and references ==
- Old Book of Tang, vol. 177.
- New Book of Tang, vol. 182.
- Zizhi Tongjian, vol. 249.
