= 840s =

Decade

The 840s decade ran from January 1, 840, to December 31, 849.

== Events ==
=== 840 ===
==== By place ====
====== Europe ======
- June 20 – Emperor Louis the Pious falls ill and dies at his hunting lodge, on an island in the Rhine, near his imperial palace at Ingelheim, while suppressing a revolt. His eldest son Lothair I succeeds him as Holy Roman Emperor, and tries to seize all the territories of the late Charlemagne. Charles the Bald, 17, becomes king of the Franks, and joins with his half-brother Louis the German, in resisting Lothair.
- Vikings from Norway capture Dublin, and establish a Norse kingdom in Ireland.

====== Britain ======
- King Wigstan of Mercia, grandson of former ruler Wiglaf (see 839), declines his kingship in preference of the religious life. He asks his widowed mother, Princess Ælfflæd, to act as regent. A nobleman of the line of the late king Beornred, named Berhtric, wishes to marry her but he is a relative. Wigstan refuses the match, and is murdered by followers of Berhtric at Wistow. He is buried at Repton Abbey, and later revered as a saint. The Mercian throne is seized by Berhtric's father, Beorhtwulf.
- Vikings make permanent settlements with their first 'wintering over', located at Lough Neagh in Northern Ireland (approximate date).

====== Asia ======
- Emperor Wenzong (Li Ang) dies after a 13-year reign, in which he has failed to break the power of his palace eunuchs. He is succeeded by his brother Wu Zong, as Chinese ruler of the Tang dynasty.
- The Yenisei Kirghiz settle along the Yenisei River, and sack with a force of around 80,000 horsemen the Uyghur capital, Ordu-Baliq (driving the Uyghurs out of Mongolia). This ends the Uyghur Khaganate.
- The 840 Erzurum earthquake takes place in the city of Qaliqala (modern Erzurum).

==== By topic ====
====== Religion ======
- Nobis becomes bishop of St. David's, in the Welsh Kingdom of Dyfed (approximate date).

=== 841 ===
==== By place ====
====== Europe ======
- June 25 – Battle of Fontenay: Frankish forces of Emperor Lothair I, and his nephew Pepin II of Aquitaine, are defeated by allied forces of King Louis the German, and his half-brother Charles the Bald, at Fontenoy (Eastern France), in a civil war among the three surviving sons of the former emperor Louis the Pious. A total of 40,000 men are killed, including the Frankish nobles Gerard of Auvergne and Ricwin of Nantes, fighting on the side of Charles.
- Summer – Vikings sail up the River Seine and devastate the city of Rouen in Normandy. They burn the Benedictine monastery of Jumièges Abbey; 68 captives are taken, and returned on payment of a ransom, by the monks of St. Denis.

====== Ireland ======
- The town of Dyflin (meaning "Black Pool") or Dublin (modern Ireland) is founded by Norwegian Vikings, on the south bank of the River Liffey. The settlement is fortified with a ditch and an earth rampart, with a wooden palisade on top. The Norsemen establish a wool weaving industry, and there is also a slave trade. An artificial hill is erected, where the nobility meets to make laws and discuss policy.

====== Byzantine Empire ======
- Constantine Kontomytes, Byzantine general (strategos) of the Thracesian Theme, inflicts a severe defeat on the Cretan Saracens. He leads a Byzantine expeditionary force, to raid the monastic community near Mount Latros (modern Turkey).
- Venice sends a fleet of 60 galleys (each carrying 200 men) to assist the Byzantines in driving the Arabs from Crotone, but the attack fails. Muslim troops conquer the city of Brindisi (approximate date).

====== Abbasid Caliphate ======
- A pro-Umayyad rebellion, led by al-Mubarqa in Palestine, breaks out against caliph al-Mu'tasim of the Abbasid Caliphate (ending in 842).

====== Asia ======
- In the Chinese capital of Chang'an, the West Market (and East Market) are closed every night one hour and three quarters before dusk (by government order); the curfew is signaled by the sound of 300 beats to a loud gong. After the official markets have been closed for the night, small night markets in residential areas thrive with plenty of customers, despite government efforts to shut them down. With the decline of the government's authority (by mid 9th century), this edict (like many others) is largely ignored, as urban dwellers keep attending the night markets regardless.
- December 17 – Comet X/841 Y1 is first sighted in Chang'an by the Japanese monk Ennin.

=== 842 ===
==== By place ====
====== Byzantine Empire ======
- January 20 – Emperor Theophilos dies of dysentery at Constantinople, after a 12-year reign in which he expended much effort defending the eastern frontier against the invading Muslim Arabs. Theophilos is succeeded by his 2-year-old son Michael III, with his mother Theodora as regent and the 'temporary' sole ruler of the Byzantine Empire.
- February 19 – The Medieval Iconoclastic Controversy ends, as a council in Constantinople formally reinstates the veneration of icons in the churches.

====== Europe ======
- February 13 – Last reported sighting of the comet X/841 Y1 according to the Annals of Fontenelle.
- February 14 – Oaths of Strasbourg: King Louis the German, ruler of East Francia, and his half-brother Charles the Bald, ruler of West Francia, meet with their armies at Strasbourg. They agree to swear allegiance (recorded in vernacular languages) to each other, and to support each other against their brother Lothair I (nominal emperor of all the Frankish kingdoms and the Holy Roman Empire).
- March 20 – King Alfonso II of Asturias (Northern Spain) dies after a 50-year reign, in which he undertook numerous campaigns against the Muslim armies of the Umayyad Emirate of Córdoba, and allied himself with the late Charlemagne. The childless Alfonso chooses Ramiro I, son of former king Bermudo I, as his successor.

====== Britain ======
- Uurad of the Picts dies after a 3-year reign, and is succeeded by his son Bridei VI, who contests his power with rival groups, led by Bruide son of Fokel and Kenneth MacAlpin.
- Vikings attack the Irish monastery at Clonmacnoise from bases in Ireland.

====== Abbasid Caliphate ======
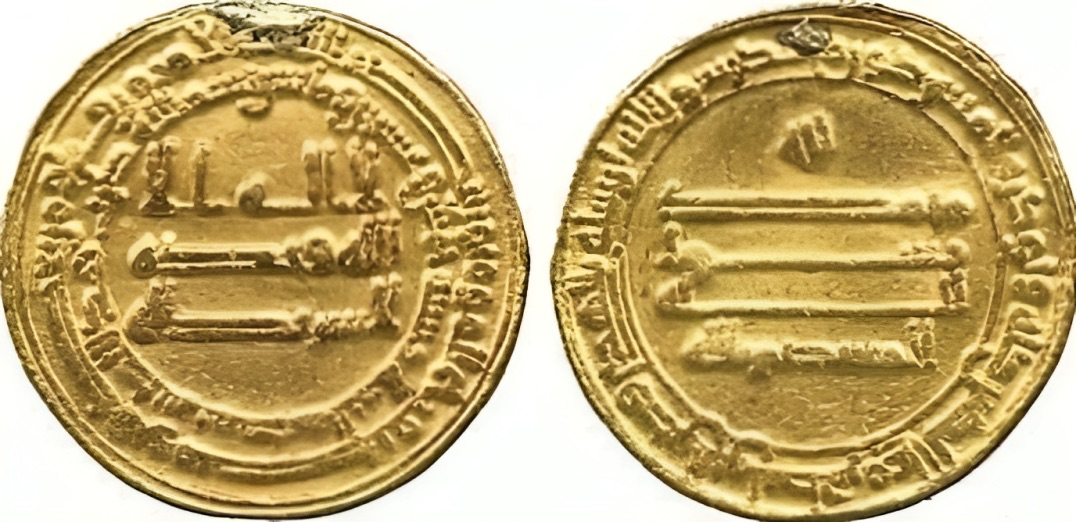
Abbasid dinar of al-Mutasim, he became ill and died on 05–01–842

- January 5 – Caliph Al-Mu'tasim dies at Samarra (modern Iraq), after an eight year reign. He is succeeded by his son Al-Wathiq, as ruler of the Abbasid Caliphate.

=== 843 ===
==== By place ====
====== Europe ======
- May 24 – Battle of Blain: Breton forces under Erispoe, count of Vannes, defeat the Franks led by Renaud d'Herbauges, near the town of Messac, at the River Vilaine. This battle marks a Breton war between Charles the Bald and Nominoe, duke of Brittany.
- Summer – Viking raiders attack Nantes, located on the River Loire; they kill the town's bishop along with many of the clergy, and murder men, women and children. They plunder the western parts of Aquitaine and reach an island north of the mouth of the River Garonne, near what later will be La Rochelle. There the Vikings bring materials from the mainland and build houses to spend the winter.
- August 10 – Treaty of Verdun: The Frankish Empire is divided into three kingdoms, between the three surviving sons of the late emperor Louis the Pious. King Louis the German receives the eastern portion (everything east of the River Rhine), called the Eastern Frankish Realm, which is the precursor to modern-day Germany. Emperor Lothair I receives the central portion (Low Countries, Alsace, Lorraine, Burgundy and the northern half of Italy), called the Central Frankish Realm. King Charles the Bald receives the western portion (everything west of the River Rhône), called the Western Frankish Realm, which later becomes France.

====== British Isles ======
- King Kenneth MacAlpin (Cináed mac Ailpín) of the Scots also becomes king of the Picts; he is crowned (on the Stone of Destiny) as first monarch of the new nation of Scotland. The Alpin Dynasty of Scottish kings begins to reign.

====== Arabian Empire ======
- Summer – A Byzantine expedition, led by Theoktistos, conquers Crete from the Saracens. After initial success, he is forced to abandon his army, due to political intrigues in Constantinople. The troops are left behind and slaughtered by the Arabs.
- Al-Andalus: The city of Zaragossa rises against the Umayyad Emirate of Córdoba in modern-day Spain.

====== Asia ======
- In the Chinese capital of Chang'an, a large fire consumes 4,000 homes, warehouses and other buildings in the East Market, yet the rest of the city is at a safe distance from the blaze which is largely quarantined in East Central Chang'an, thanks to the large width of roads in Chang'an that produce fire breaks.

==== By topic ====
====== Religion ======
- March 11 – Feast of Orthodoxy – Official end of Iconoclasm: Empress Theodora II restores the veneration of icons in the Orthodox churches in the Byzantine Empire.
- Theodora II orders a persecution against the Paulicians throughout Anatolia; about 100,000 followers in the Byzantine theme of Armenia are massacred.

=== 844 ===
==== By place ====
====== Byzantine Empire ======
- Spring – Battle of Mauropotamos: A Byzantine expedition under Theoktistos is sent to Anatolia (modern Turkey), against the Muslim Arabs of the Abbasid Caliphate, who have raided the Byzantine themes of Cappadocia, Anatolikon, Boukellarion, and Opsikion. The Byzantines are defeated, and many of the officers defect to the Arabs.

====== Europe ======
- Viking raiders ascend the River Garonne as far as the city of Toulouse, and pillage the lands of Septimania. Part of the marauding Vikings invades Galicia (Northern Spain), where some perish in a storm at sea. After being defeated in Corunna, the Scandinavian raiders sack the Umayyad cities of Seville (see below), Niebla, Beja, and Lisbon.
- Summer – King Charles the Bald struggles against the repeated rebellions in Aquitaine, and against the Bretons in West Francia. He besieges Bernard I at the Battle of Toulouse, while Duke Nominoe raids into Maine, and plunders other Frankish territory.
- June 15 – Louis II, eldest son of Emperor Lothair I, is crowned king at Rome by Pope Sergius II, and becomes co-ruler of Middle Francia, and over Lombardy, Friuli, and Tuscany in Italy.
- September 25–November 11 or 17 – Viking raid on Seville (844): Vikings arrive in Seville by the Guadalquivir, taking the city on October 1 or 3 and pillaging it; but are expelled by forces of the Emirate of Córdoba.

====== Britain ======
- King Æthelred II of Northumbria is expelled from his kingdom by Rædwulf, who takes the throne. Rædwulf is later killed in battle against the Vikings, along with many of his noblemen. Æthelred returns and claims his right to rule.
- King Merfyn Frych dies after a 24-year reign. He is succeeded by his son Rhodri Mawr ("the Great"), who thus becomes ruler of Gwynedd (Wales).

==== By topic ====
====== Religion ======
- January 25 – Pope Gregory IV dies after a 16-year reign, in which he has supported the Frankish policy of late emperor Louis the Pious, and established the observance of All Saints' Day. He is succeeded by Sergius II, as the 102nd pope of Rome. Sergius imprisons the antipope John VIII, and is elected by popular acclamation.

=== 845 ===
==== By place ====
====== Byzantine Empire ======
- Byzantine–Arab War: A prisoner exchange occurs between the Byzantine Empire and the Abbasid Caliphate, at the River Lamos in Cilicia (modern Turkey). The exchanges last for 10 days, and the Byzantines recover 4,600 prisoners.

====== Europe ======
- March 28 or 29 (Easter) – Siege of Paris: Viking forces under the Norse chieftain Ragnar Lodbrok enter the River Seine, with a fleet of 120 longships (5,000 men). They pass through the city of Rouen and plunder the countryside. King Charles the Bald assembles an army and sends it to protect Paris, the capital of the West Frankish Kingdom. Ragnar routs the enemy forces, and hangs 111 of their prisoners in honour of Odin. Charles — to keep them from plundering his kingdom — pays a large tribute of 7,000 livres (pounds) of silver or gold, in exchange for their leaving. The Vikings also sack the cities of Hamburg and Melun.
- November 22 – Battle of Ballon: Frankish forces (3,000 men) led by Charles the Bald are defeated by Nominoe, count of Vannes, near Redon, Ille-et-Vilaine. After the battle, Brittany becomes a regnum 'kingdom' within the Frankish Empire.
- Viking forces destroy Hamburg.

====== Asia ======
- Great Anti-Buddhist Persecution: Emperor Wu Zong begins the persecution of Buddhists and other foreign religions in China, such as Zoroastrianism, Nestorian Christianity and Manichaeism. More than 4,600 monasteries, 40,000 temples and numerous shrines are destroyed. More than 260,000 Buddhist monks and nuns are forced to return to secular life.
- March 6 – 42 captured Byzantine officials from Amorium are executed at Samarra, then the capital of the Abbasid Caliphate, after they repeatedly refuse attempts to convert them to Islam.

==== By topic ====
====== Religion ======
- John Scotus Eriugena, Irish theologian, travels to France and takes over the Palatine Academy in Paris, at the invitation of Charles the Bald (approximate date).

=== 846 ===
==== By place ====
====== Byzantine Empire ======
- Byzantine–Bulgarian War: The Bulgarians violate the peace treaty (see 815), and invade Macedonia along the River Struma. The cities of Serres and Philippi are devastated.

====== Europe ======
- Summer – Breton forces under Nominoe occupy the Frankish cities of Nantes and Rennes. He makes raids in Anjou and threatens Bayeux. King Charles the Bald recognizes him as duke of Brittany.
- Prince Pribina becomes a vassal of the Frankish Empire. King Louis the German grants him land near Lake Balaton (modern Hungary). He establishes Blatnohrad, capital of Balaton Principality.
- Frankish forces led by Louis the German invade Moravia. They encounter little resistance, and depose King Mojmir I from the throne. His relative, Rastislav, is set up as the new client ruler.
- Muslim forces attempt to raid Rome but only pillage the countryside around the city before being beaten back by Duke Guy I of Spoleto. In the aftermath, Pope Leo IV starts walling the area around the Vatican hill, creating the Leonine City.
- The Mozarabs, Iberian Christians who live under Moorish rule, try to repopulate León in Al-Andalus (modern Spain). The city is recaptured by the Muslim Arabs.

====== Britain ======
- King Æthelred II of Northumbria sends military assistance to the Picts, in their fight against the invading Scots (approximate date).

====== Ireland ======
- Máel Sechnaill mac Máele Ruanaid becomes the first High King of Ireland. ^{[Factually disputed. Source needed]}

====== Arabian Empire ======
- A Saracen Arab expeditionary force from Africa, consisting of 11,000 men and 500 horses, raid the outskirts of Rome, sacking the basilicas of Old St. Peter's and St. Paul's Outside the Walls.

====== Asia ======
- April 22 – Emperor Wu Zong (Li Chan) dies after a 6-year reign. He is succeeded by his uncle Xuān Zong, as Chinese ruler of the Tang Dynasty.
- Chang Pogo, a powerful maritime hegemon of Silla, is assassinated by aristocratic elements at his garrison headquarters by Yŏm Chang (or 841).

=== 847 ===
==== By place ====
====== Europe ======
- Danish Vikings land in the Breton March (western part of Gaul). Duke Nominoe of Brittany fails to withstand them in battle, but succeeds in buying them off with gifts and persuading them to leave (approximate date).
- Viking Age: The Vikings plunder the Lower Rhine, as part of their attacks on the Empire of Francia.
- The Saracens, under the Berber leader Kalfun, capture the Byzantine city of Bari (Southern Italy). He becomes the first ruler of the Emirate of Bari, and expands his influence on the Italian mainland with raids.

====== Abbasid Caliphate ======
- August 10 – Caliph Al-Wathiq dies of dropsy after a five-year reign. He is succeeded by his brother al-Mutawakkil.

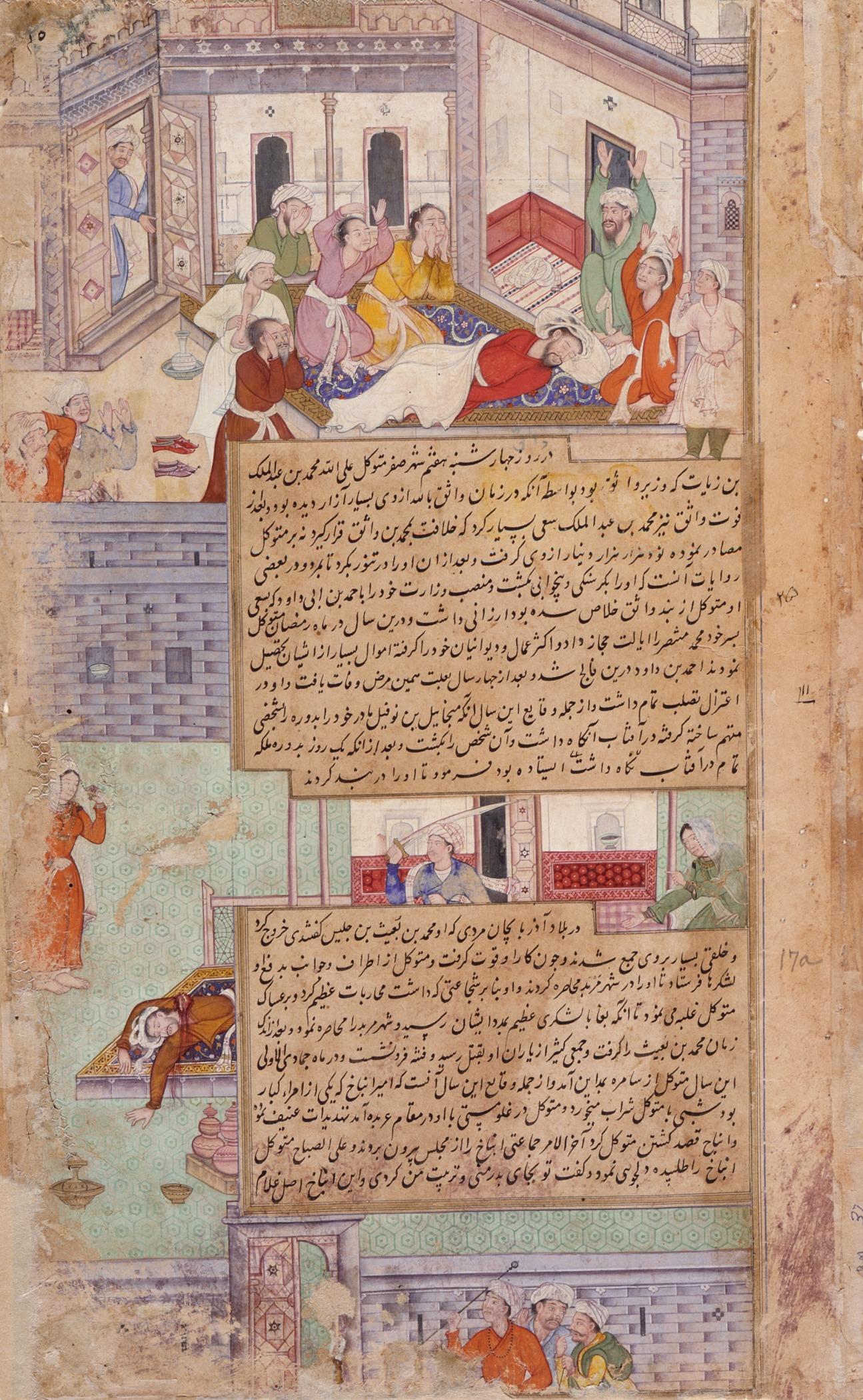
Death of Abbasid caliph Al-Wathiq, He died as the result of dropsy on 10 August 847. He was succeeded by his brother al-Mutawakkil.

==== By topic ====
====== Natural events ======
- November 24 – 847 Damascus earthquake

====== Religion ======
- January 24 – Pope Sergius II dies of gout after a 3-year reign. He is succeeded by Leo IV, as the 103rd pope of Rome.
- April 21– Rabanus Maurus, a Frankish Benedictine monk, becomes archbishop of Mainz after the death of Odgar.

=== 848 ===
==== By place ====
====== Europe ======
- Summer – Bordeaux, capital of Aquitaine, falls into the hands of Viking raiders. King Charles the Bald sends a Frankish fleet to lift the siege. Despite destroying some Viking longships on the Dordogne River, they fail to save the city. The Abbey of Saint-Pierre in Brantôme is sacked.
- Emperor Lothair I, and his (half) brothers Louis the German and Charles the Bald, meet in Koblenz to continue the system of "con-fraternal government".
- Frankish forces under Count (comté) William of Septimania assume authority over the counties of Barcelona and Empúries (modern Spain).
- The Saracens conquer Ragusa (Sicily), after its Byzantine garrison is forced by severe famine to surrender. The city and its castle are razed to the ground.
- Máel Sechnaill mac Maíl Ruanaid, High King of Mide, defeats a Norse Viking army at Sciath Nechtain in Ireland (approximate date).

====== Britain ======
- The armies of Brycheiniog and Gwent clash in the battle of Ffinnant (Wales). King Ithel of Gwent is killed in the fighting (approximate date).

====== Asia ======
- The Medieval Cholas in Southern India start to rule (approximate date).

==== By topic ====
====== Religion ======
- Pope Leo IV builds (on the opposite of the Tiber River) the Leonine City, a fortified three-kilometre wall that encircles the Vatican Hill and Borgo, to defend Rome.
- The Roman Catholic church of Santa María del Naranco, on the slope of Monte Naranco (Northern Spain), is completed.

=== 849 ===
==== By place ====
====== Europe ======
- Summer – Battle of Ostia: A Saracen Arab fleet from Sardinia sets sail towards Rome. In response, Pope Leo IV forms a coalition of maritime Italian cities, including Naples, Amalfi and Gaeta, led by Admiral Caesar — which is assembled off the re-fortified port of Ostia — and repels the Saracen marauders. Their navy is scattered, resulting in many sunken vessels. Rome is saved from plunder and the expansion of the Aghlabids.
- Frankish forces under King Charles the Bald invade southern France, and conquer the territory of Toulouse. He appoints Fredelo as count (comté) of Toulouse, who founds the Rouergue dynasty. Aquitaine is submitted to the West Frankish Kingdom.

====== Abbasid Caliphate ======
- The Armenian prince Bagrat II begins a rebellion against Caliph Al-Mutawakkil, of the Abbasid Caliphate.

====== Asia ======
- In the Chinese capital city of Chang'an, an imperial prince is impeached during the Tang Dynasty from his position by officials at court, for erecting a building that obstructs a street in the northwesternmost ward in South Central Chang'an.
- King Pyinbya of Burma founds the city of Bagan, located in the Mandalay Region, and fortifies it with walls.

== Significant people ==
- Al-Mu'tasim
- Al-Wathiq
- Alfred the Great
- Louis the Pious
- Charles the Bald
- Ermentrude of Orléans
- Louis the Stammerer
- Louis the German
- Lothair I
- Kenneth I of Scotland
- Ragnar Lodbrok
- Michael III

== Births ==
840

- January – Michael III, Byzantine emperor (d. 867) This date of birth is generally held as uncertain; though January 840 is the most probable, 839 is also possible.
- October 25 – Ya'qub ibn al-Layth al-Saffar, founder of the Saffarid dynasty (d. 879)
- Abu al-Hassan al-Nuri, Muslim Sufi (approximate date)
- Adalhard II, Frankish nobleman (approximate date)
- Berengaudus, Benedictine monk (d. 892)
- Clement of Ohrid, Bulgarian scholar (approximate date)
- Eudokia Ingerina, Byzantine empress (approximate date)
- Hucbald, Frankish music theorist (or 850)
- Lothar I, Frankish nobleman (d. 880)
- Notker the Stammerer, Benedictine monk (approximate date)
- Richardis, Frankish empress (approximate date)
- Sunyer II, Frankish nobleman (approximate date)
- Theodard, archbishop of Narbonne (approximate date)
- Theodore II, pope of the Catholic Church (d. 897)
- Unruoch III, margrave of Friuli (approximate date)

841

- Bernard Plantapilosa, Frankish nobleman (d. 886)
- Boso of Provence, Frankish nobleman (approximate date)
- Du Rangneng, chancellor of the Tang Dynasty (d. 893)
- Edmund the Martyr, king of East Anglia (approximate date)
- Heiric of Auxerre, Frankish theologian and writer (d. 876)
- Pei Shu, chancellor of the Tang Dynasty (d. 905)
- Remigius of Auxerre, Frankish scholar (approximate date)

842

- Al-Mundhir, Muslim emir (approximate date)
- Al-Muwaffaq, Muslim prince and regent (d. 891)
- Li Hanzhi, Chinese warlord (d. 899)
- Pietro I Candiano, doge of Venice (approximate date)
- Yang Fuguang, Chinese general (d. 883)

843

- Judith of Flanders, queen of Wessex and countess of Flanders (approximate date)

844

- Abdullah ibn Muhammad al-Umawi, Muslim emir (d. 912)
- Al-Mu'tamid, Muslim caliph (d. 892)
- Hasan al-Utrush, Muslim emir (approximate date)
- Sosei, Japanese waka poet (approximate date)
- Yu Xuanji, Chinese poet (approximate date)

845

- August 1 – Sugawara no Michizane, Japanese politician (d. 903)
- Árpád, Grand Prince of the Hungarians (approximate date)
- Berengar I, king of Italy (approximate date)
- Charles of Provence, Frankish king (d. 863)
- Liutgard of Saxony, Frankish queen (approximate date)
- Minamoto no Yoshiari, Japanese official (d. 897)
- Ricfried, Frankish nobleman (d. 950)
- Richilde of Provence, Frankish empress (approximate date)

846

- Gyeongmun, king of Silla (Korea) (d. 875)
- November 1 – Louis the Stammerer, king of West Francia (d. 879)
- Du Xunhe, Chinese poet (d. 904)
- Hasan al-Askari, 11th Shia Imam (d. 874)
- Li Yi, Chinese poet (approximate date)
- Rollo, Viking leader and count (approximate date)
- Wang Chao, Chinese warlord (d. 898)
- Zhang Chengye, Chinese eunuch official (d. 922)

847

- Æthelred I, king of Wessex (approximate date)
- Al-Mu'tazz, Muslim caliph (d. 869)
- Charles the Child, king of Aquitaine (or 848)
- Cheng Ji, Chinese general (approximate date)
- Fujiwara no Sukeyo, Japanese aristocrat (d. 897)
- Kang Junli, general of the Tang Dynasty (d. 894)
- Lu Yi, chancellor of the Tang Dynasty (d. 905)
- Miyoshi Kiyotsura, Japanese scholar (d. 918)
- Wang Jian, emperor of Former Shu (d. 918)
- Wang Jingchong, Chinese general (d. 883)

848

- Alfonso III, king of Asturias (approximate date)
- Carloman, Frankish abbot (d. 877)
- Charles the Child, king of Aquitaine (or 847)
- Lothair the Lame, Frankish abbot (d. 865)
- Onneca Fortúnez, Basque princess (or 850)

849

- May – Isma'il ibn Ahmad, Muslim emir (d. 907)
- Alfred the Great, king of Wessex (d. 899)
- Eric Anundsson, king of Sweden (d. 882)

== Deaths ==
840

- March 14 – Einhard, Frankish scholar
- June 11 – Junna, emperor of Japan (b. 785)
- June 16 or 839 – Rorgon I, Frankish nobleman
- June 20 – Louis the Pious, ruler of the Carolingian Empire (b. 778)
- Agobard, archbishop of Lyon (b. 779)
- Andrew II, duke of Naples
- Ansovinus, archbishop of Camerino
- Czimislav, king of the Sorbs (approximate date)
- He Jintao, general of the Tang dynasty
- Hilduin, archbishop of Paris (b. 775)
- Li Chengmei, prince of the Tang dynasty
- Li Rong, prince of the Tang dynasty
- Muhammad at-Taqi, Muslim ninth Ismā'īlī imam (or 839)
- Salmawaih ibn Bunan, Muslim physician
- Wen Zong, emperor of the Tang dynasty (b. 809)
- Wigstan, king of Mercia (approximate date)
- Yang, consort and concubine of Wen Zong

841

- June 25 – Gerard of Auvergne, Frankish nobleman
- June 25 – Ricwin of Nantes, Frankish nobleman
- October 14 – Shi Yuanzhong, Chinese governor
- Arnulf of Sens, illegitimate son of Louis the Pious
- Guifeng Zongmi, Chinese Buddhist monk (b. 780)
- Chang Pogo, Korean maritime hegemon (or 846)
- Jonas of Orléans, Frankish bishop
- Khaydhar ibn Kawus al-Afshin, Muslim general
- Langdarma, emperor of Tibet (b. 799)
- Li Ao, Chinese philosopher and prose writer (b. 772)
- Yunyan Tansheng, Chinese Buddhist monk (b. 780)

842

- January 5 – Al-Mu'tasim, Muslim caliph (b. 796)
- January 20 – Theophilus, Byzantine emperor (b. 813)
- March 9 – Humbert, bishop of Würzburg
- March 16 – Xiao Mian, chancellor of the Tang Dynasty
- August 16 – Death of Qaratis also known as Umm Harun, was the mother of Abbasid caliph al-Wathiq (r. 842–847). She died during her Hajj pilgrimage journey.
- August 24 – Saga, emperor of Japan (b. 786)
- October 22 – Abo, Japanese prince (b. 792)
- Alfonso II, king of Asturias (b. 759)
- Bernard of Vienne, Frankish bishop (b. 778)
- Dúngal mac Fergaile, king of Osraige (Ireland)
- Li Cheng, chancellor of the Tang Dynasty
- Liu Yuxi, Chinese poet and philosopher (b. 772)
- Sugawara no Kiyotomo, Japanese nobleman (b. 770)
- Uurad, king of the Picts (approximate date)
- We Gyaltore Taknye, Tibetan nobleman
- Zheng Tan, chancellor of the Tang Dynasty

843

- April 19 – Judith of Bavaria, Frankish empress
- 2 November – Anthony the Confessor, Byzantine bishop of Thessalinike
- Al-Mada'ini, Muslim scholar and historian (b. 752)
- Ardo Smaragdus, Frankish abbot and hagiographer
- Bridei VI, king of the Picts (Scotland)
- Fergus mac Fothaid, king of Connacht (Ireland)
- Fujiwara no Otsugu, Japanese statesman (b. 773)
- Jia Dao, Chinese poet and Buddhist monk (b. 779)
- Landulf I, gastald (or count) of Capua (Italy)
- Liu Congjian, Chinese governor (jiedushi) (b. 803)
- Qiu Shiliang, Chinese eunuch official
- Renaud d'Herbauges, Frankish nobleman (b. 795)

844

- January 11 – Michael I, former Byzantine emperor
- January 25 – Gregory IV, pope of the Catholic Church
- Abdallah ibn Tahir, Muslim governor (or 845)
- Abu Ja'far Ashinas, Muslim general
- Alberik II, Frankish bishop
- Bera, count of Barcelona
- Bernard II, count of Poitiers
- Bernard I, duke of Septimania
- Chen Yixing, chancellor of the Tang Dynasty
- Ekkehard, Frankish nobleman
- Galindo Garcés, count of Aragon
- Hugh, illegitimate son of Charlemagne (b. 802)
- Merfyn Frych, king of Gwynedd (Wales)
- Mukhariq, Abbasid court singer
- Nithard, Frankish historian
- Rædwulf, king of Northumbria (approximate date)
- Tachibana no Hayanari, Japanese calligrapher (d. 782)
- Theodrada, Frankrish princess and abbess (or 853)

845

- February 22 – Wang, empress and concubine of Mu Zong
- Abdallah ibn Tahir, Muslim governor (or 844)
- Abu Tammam, Muslim poet (b. 788)
- Bridei VII, king of the Picts
- Dionysius I, Syrian patriarch
- Ecgred, bishop of Lindisfarne
- Eginhard, bishop of Utrecht
- Guerin, Frankish nobleman (or 856)
- Ibn Sa'd al-Baghdadi, Muslim historian (b. 784)
- Mislav, duke of Croatia (approximate date)
- Sahl ibn Bishr, Muslim astrologer (approximate date)
- Theophanes the Branded, Byzantine monk (b. 775)
- Turgesius, Viking chieftain (approximate date)

846

- April 22 – Wu Zong, emperor of the Tang Dynasty (b. 814)
- July 29 – Li Shen, chancellor of the Tang Dynasty
- Bai Ju Yi, Chinese poet and official (b. 772)
- Dantivarman, king of the Pallava Empire (India)
- Ferdomnach, Irish monk and illuminator
- Chang Pogo, Korean maritime hegemon (or 841)
- Joannicius the Great, Byzantine theologian (b. 752)
- Li Zongmin, chancellor of the Tang Dynasty
- Mojmir I, king of Moravia (approximate date)
- Niall Caille, High King of Ireland
- Reginbert of Reichenau, German librarian
- Seguin II, Frankish nobleman
- Wang, concubine of Wu Zong

847

- January 27 – Sergius II, pope of the Catholic Church (b. 790)
- April 21 – Odgar, Frankish monk and archbishop
- June 1 – Xiao, empress of the Tang Dynasty
- June 14 – Methodius I, patriarch of Constantinople
- August 10 – Al-Wathiq, Muslim caliph (b. 816)
- Fedelmid mac Crimthainn, king of Munster (Ireland)
- Frothar of Toul, Frankish bishop (approximate date)
- Hetto, Frankish archbishop (approximate date)
- Isa ibn Mansur al-Rafi'i, Muslim governor
- Muhammad ibn al-Zayyat, Abbasid vizier
- Li Rangyi, chancellor of the Tang Dynasty
- Theodemar of Iria, Galician bishop

848

- Cui Yuanshi, chancellor of the Tang dynasty
- Drest X, king of the Picts
- Guo, empress dowager of the Tang dynasty
- Ithel, king of Gwent (approximate date)
- Li Gongzuo, Chinese writer
- Malik ibn Kaydar, Muslim governor
- Rechtabhra, bishop of Clonfert
- Shi Xiong, Chinese general
- Sunifred, Frankish nobleman
- Sunyer I, Frankish nobleman
- William I, duke of Gascony
- Yahya al-Laithi, Muslim scholar

849

- January 15 – Theophylact, Byzantine co-emperor (b. c.793)
- Ali ibn Muhammad, Idrisid emir of Morocco
- c. February – Harthamah ibn al-Nadr al-Jabali, Muslim governor
- June – Ali ibn al-Madini, Muslim scholar (b. 778)
- c. June? – Ragenar, bishop of Amiens
- August 18 – Walafrid Strabo, Frankish theological writer
- Conaing mac Flainn, king of Brega (Ireland)
- Connagan, bishop of Clonfert (Ireland)
- Guntbold, archbishop of Rouen
- Itakh (Ītākh al-Khazarī), Muslim general
- Zhang Zhongwu, Chinese general
