= 841 =

Calendar year

841 in various calendars
- Gregorian calendar: 841; DCCCXLI
- Ab urbe condita: 1594
- Armenian calendar: 290; ԹՎ ՄՂ
- Assyrian calendar: 5591
- Balinese saka calendar: 762–763
- Bengali calendar: 247–248
- Berber calendar: 1791
- Buddhist calendar: 1385
- Burmese calendar: 203
- Byzantine calendar: 6349–6350
- Chinese calendar: 庚申年 (Metal Monkey); 3538 or 3331 — to — 辛酉年 (Metal Rooster); 3539 or 3332
- Coptic calendar: 557–558
- Discordian calendar: 2007
- Ethiopian calendar: 833–834
- Hebrew calendar: 4601–4602
- Hindu calendars
- Vikram Samvat: 897–898
- Shaka Samvat: 762–763
- Kali Yuga: 3941–3942
- Holocene calendar: 10841
- Iranian calendar: 219–220
- Islamic calendar: 226–227
- Japanese calendar: Jōwa 8 (承和８年)
- Javanese calendar: 738–739
- Julian calendar: 841; DCCCXLI
- Korean calendar: 3174
- Minguo calendar: 1071 before ROC 民前1071年
- Nanakshahi calendar: −627
- Seleucid era: 1152/1153 AG
- Thai solar calendar: 1383–1384
- Tibetan calendar: ལྕགས་ཕོ་སྤྲེ་ལོ་ (male Iron-Monkey); 967 or 586 or −186 — to — ལྕགས་མོ་བྱ་ལོ་ (female Iron-Bird); 968 or 587 or −185

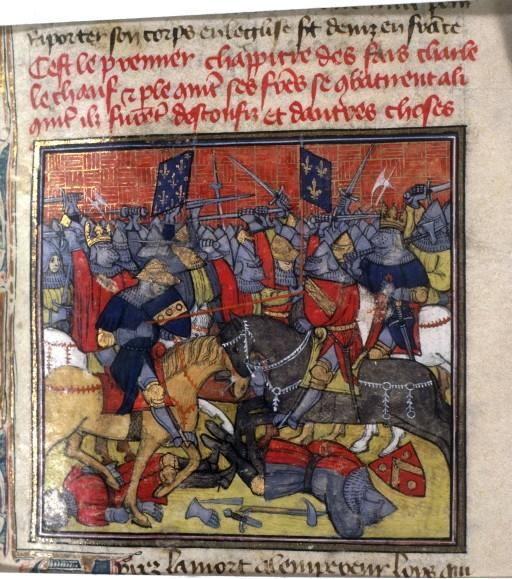
The Battle of Fontenay (841)

Year 841 (DCCCXLI) was a common year starting on Saturday of the Julian calendar.

== Events ==
=== By place ===
==== Europe ====
- June 25 – Battle of Fontenay: Frankish forces of Emperor Lothair I, and his nephew Pepin II of Aquitaine, are defeated by allied forces of King Louis the German, and his half-brother Charles the Bald, at Fontenoy (Eastern France), in a civil war among the three surviving sons of the former emperor Louis the Pious. A total of 40,000 men are killed, including the Frankish nobles Gerard of Auvergne and Ricwin of Nantes, fighting on the side of Charles.
- Summer – Vikings sail up the River Seine and devastate the city of Rouen in Normandy. They burn the Benedictine monastery of Jumièges Abbey; 68 captives are taken, and returned on payment of a ransom, by the monks of St. Denis.

==== Ireland ====
- The town of Dyflin (meaning "Black Pool") or Dublin (modern Ireland) is founded by Norwegian Vikings, on the south bank of the River Liffey. The settlement is fortified with a ditch and an earth rampart, with a wooden palisade on top. The Norsemen establish a wool weaving industry, and there is also a slave trade. An artificial hill is erected, where the nobility meets to make laws and discuss policy.

==== Byzantine Empire ====
- Constantine Kontomytes, Byzantine general (strategos) of the Thracesian Theme, inflicts a severe defeat on the Cretan Saracens. He leads a Byzantine expeditionary force, to raid the monastic community near Mount Latros (modern Turkey).
- Venice sends a fleet of 60 galleys (each carrying 200 men) to assist the Byzantines in driving the Arabs from Crotone, but the attack fails. Muslim troops conquer the city of Brindisi (approximate date).

==== Abbasid Caliphate ====
- A pro-Umayyad rebellion, led by al-Mubarqa in Palestine, breaks out against caliph al-Mu'tasim of the Abbasid Caliphate (ending in 842).

==== Asia ====
- In the Chinese capital of Chang'an, the West Market (and East Market) are closed every night one hour and three quarters before dusk (by government order); the curfew is signaled by the sound of 300 beats to a loud gong. After the official markets have been closed for the night, small night markets in residential areas thrive with plenty of customers, despite government efforts to shut them down. With the decline of the government's authority (by mid 9th century), this edict (like many others) is largely ignored, as urban dwellers keep attending the night markets regardless.
- December 17 – Comet X/841 Y1 is first sighted in Chang'an by the Japanese monk Ennin.

== Births ==
- Bernard Plantapilosa, Frankish nobleman (d. 886)
- Boso of Provence, Frankish nobleman (approximate date)
- Du Rangneng, chancellor of the Tang Dynasty (d. 893)
- Edmund the Martyr, king of East Anglia (approximate date)
- Heiric of Auxerre, Frankish theologian and writer (d. 876)
- Pei Shu, chancellor of the Tang Dynasty (d. 905)
- Remigius of Auxerre, Frankish scholar (approximate date)

== Deaths ==
- June 25 – Gerard of Auvergne, Frankish nobleman
- June 25 – Ricwin of Nantes, Frankish nobleman
- October 14 – Shi Yuanzhong, Chinese governor
- Arnulf of Sens, illegitimate son of Louis the Pious
- Guifeng Zongmi, Chinese Buddhist monk (b. 780)
- Chang Pogo, Korean maritime hegemon (or 846)
- Jonas of Orléans, Frankish bishop
- Khaydhar ibn Kawus al-Afshin, Muslim general
- Langdarma, emperor of Tibet (b. 799)
- Li Ao, Chinese philosopher and prose writer (b. 772)
- Yunyan Tansheng, Chinese Buddhist monk (b. 780)

== Sources ==
- Treadgold, Warren (1988). The Byzantine Revival, 780–842. Stanford, California: Stanford University Press. ISBN 978-0-8047-1462-4.
