= Dor ul-Juzjoniya Madrasah =

Madrasa in Samarkand, Uzbekistan

Dor ul-Juzjonia Madrasah

General information
- Architectural style: Central Asian Architecture
- Location: Samarkand, Uzbekistan
- Year built: 9th century

Technical details
- Material: baked brick, wood, stone and ganch

The Dor ul-Juzjoniya Madrasah (Dor ul-Juzjoniya madrasasi) is one of the madrasahs located in Samarkand, Uzbekistan.

== History ==
Dor ul-Juzjoniya madrasah was founded in Samarkand in the 9th century by Muhaddis Abu Bakr Suleiman az-Juzjony. This higher educational institution was one of the major centers of science in Samarkand in the 10th-12th centuries. The work of the madrasah began in the 9th century. The Madrasah was crowded with students like "Minor Madrasah" in the 9th-12th centuries. Abul Fath Salih was the teacher and imam of Dar ul-Juzjonia madrasah. He taught students the science of hadith and jurisprudence. Research scientist Abdusattar Jumanazar studied a number of documents and sources related to this madrasa and provided information related to it. In the madrasah, the classes started early in the morning were called as "subaiha". In Najmuddin Umar al-Nasafi's work "Al-Qand", this madrasah was citated in 18 places. Many famous scholars of Samarkand grew up in this madrasah. Abu Mansur al-Maturidi also studied at Dor ul-Juzhoniya madrasah. There was also a cemetery of the same name near the Juzjonia madrasah. According to the researcher Durbek Rahimjonov, the madrasah was one of the centers of hadith where muhaddis worked in the 11th-12th centuries. In the madrasa, classes were conducted in the fields of tafsir (interpretation of Qur'an), hadith, and literature. Caliphs (assistants) helped to teachers in teaching at Dar ul-Juzhoniya madrasah. In particular, the famous jurist Hamza ibn Ali al-Haylami, the writer Abu Muhammad Abdujalil al-Yazukhkati al-Sakkak and a number of other scholars worked as caliphs in the madrasa. Foundation properties was allocated for the madrasa. Dar ul-Juzhoniya madrasa was definitely managed on the basis of the regulations specified in the foundation document of that time, and the teachers were also appointed on this basis.

== Architecture ==
Dor ul-Juzjonia madrasah was built in the style of Central Asian Architecture. The madrasah was built of brick, wood, stone and ganch. The madrasah has not been preserved today.
