= 846 =

Calendar year

846 in various calendars
Gregorian calendar	846; DCCCXLVI
Ab urbe condita	1599
Armenian calendar	295; ԹՎ ՄՂԵ
Assyrian calendar	5596
Balinese saka calendar	767–768
Bengali calendar	252–253
Berber calendar	1796
Buddhist calendar	1390
Burmese calendar	208
Byzantine calendar	6354–6355
Chinese calendar	乙丑年 (Wood Ox); 3543 or 3336 — to — 丙寅年 (Fire Tiger); 3544 or 3337
Coptic calendar	562–563
Discordian calendar	2012
Ethiopian calendar	838–839
Hebrew calendar	4606–4607
- Hindu calendars
Vikram Samvat	902–903
Shaka Samvat	767–768
Kali Yuga	3946–3947
Holocene calendar	10846
Iranian calendar	224–225
Islamic calendar	231–232
Japanese calendar	Jōwa 13 (承和１３年)
Javanese calendar	743–744
Julian calendar	846; DCCCXLVI
Korean calendar	3179
Minguo calendar	1066 before ROC 民前1066年
Nanakshahi calendar	−622
Seleucid era	1157/1158 AG
Thai solar calendar	1388–1389
Tibetan calendar	ཤིང་མོ་གླང་ལོ་ (female Wood-Ox); 972 or 591 or −181 — to — མེ་ཕོ་སྟག་ལོ་ (male Fire-Tiger); 973 or 592 or −180

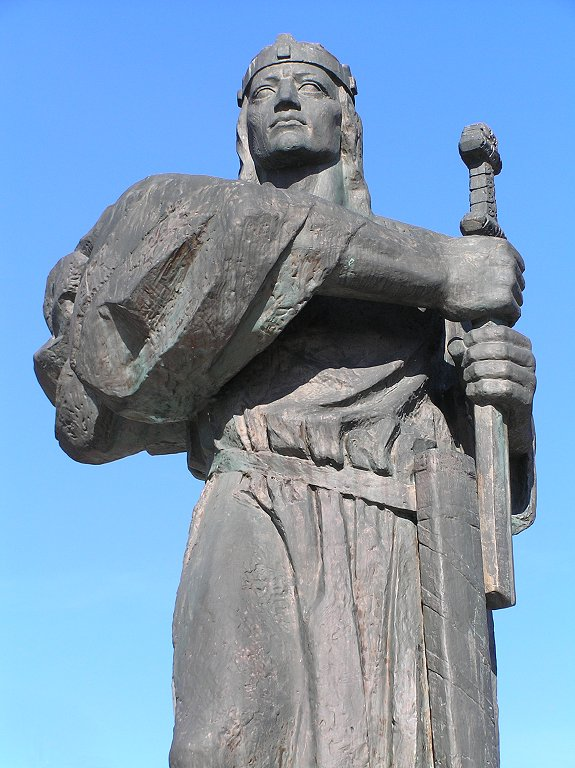
Statue of prince Pribina (c. 800–861)

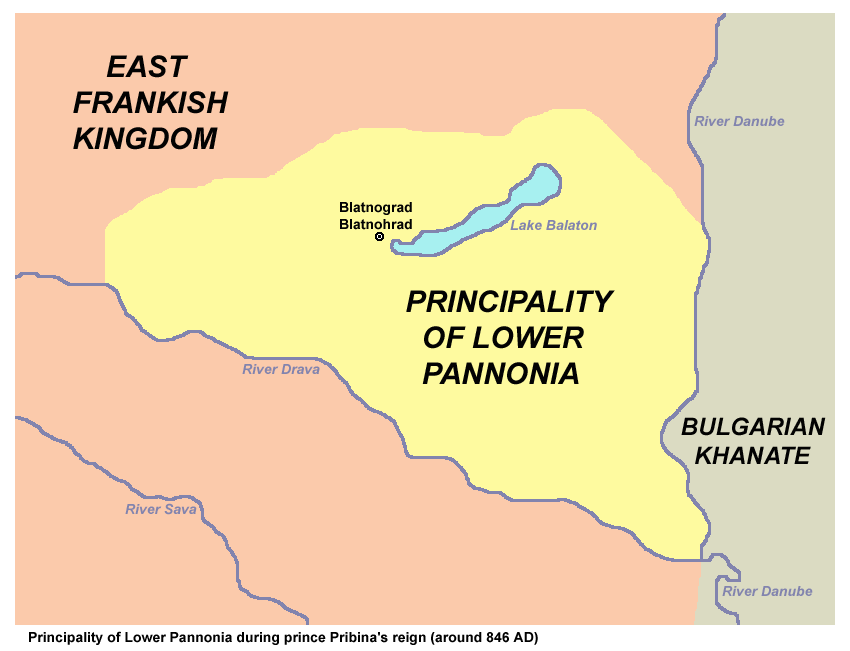
Principality of Lower Pannonia (Hungary)

Year 846 (DCCCXLVI) was a common year starting on Friday of the Julian calendar.

== Events ==
=== By place ===
==== Byzantine Empire ====
- Byzantine–Bulgarian War: The Bulgarians violate the peace treaty (see 815), and invade Macedonia along the River Struma. The cities of Serres and Philippi are devastated.

==== Europe ====
- Summer – Breton forces under Nominoe occupy the Frankish cities of Nantes and Rennes. He makes raids in Anjou and threatens Bayeux. King Charles the Bald recognizes him as duke of Brittany.
- Prince Pribina becomes a vassal of the Frankish Empire. King Louis the German grants him land near Lake Balaton (modern Hungary). He establishes Blatnohrad, capital of Balaton Principality.
- Frankish forces led by Louis the German invade Moravia. They encounter little resistance, and depose King Mojmir I from the throne. His relative, Rastislav, is set up as the new client ruler.
- Muslim forces attempt to raid Rome but only pillage the countryside around the city before being beaten back by Duke Guy I of Spoleto. In the aftermath, Pope Leo IV starts walling the area around the Vatican hill, creating the Leonine City.
- The Mozarabs, Iberian Christians who live under Moorish rule, try to repopulate León in Al-Andalus (modern Spain). The city is recaptured by the Muslim Arabs.

==== Britain ====
- King Æthelred II of Northumbria sends military assistance to the Picts, in their fight against the invading Scots (approximate date).

==== Ireland ====
- Máel Sechnaill mac Máele Ruanaid becomes the first High King of Ireland. ^{[Factually disputed. Source needed]}

==== Arabian Empire ====
- A Saracen Arab expeditionary force from Africa, consisting of 11,000 men and 500 horses, raid the outskirts of Rome, sacking the basilicas of Old St. Peter's and St. Paul's Outside the Walls.

==== Asia ====
- April 22 – Emperor Wu Zong (Li Chan) dies after a 6-year reign. He is succeeded by his uncle Xuān Zong, as Chinese ruler of the Tang Dynasty.
- Chang Pogo, a powerful maritime hegemon of Silla, is assassinated by aristocratic elements at his garrison headquarters by Yŏm Chang (or 841).

== Births ==
- Gyeongmun, king of Silla (Korea) (d. 875)
- November 1 – Louis the Stammerer, king of West Francia (d. 879)
- Du Xunhe, Chinese poet (d. 904)
- Hasan al-Askari, 11th Shia Imam (d. 874)
- Li Yi, Chinese poet (approximate date)
- Rollo, Viking leader and count (approximate date)
- Wang Chao, Chinese warlord (d. 898)
- Zhang Chengye, Chinese eunuch official (d. 922)

== Deaths ==
- April 22 – Wu Zong, emperor of the Tang Dynasty (b. 814)
- July 29 – Li Shen, chancellor of the Tang Dynasty
- Bai Ju Yi, Chinese poet and official (b. 772)
- Dantivarman, king of the Pallava Empire (India)
- Ferdomnach, Irish monk and illuminator
- Chang Pogo, Korean maritime hegemon (or 841)
- Joannicius the Great, Byzantine theologian (b. 752)
- Li Zongmin, chancellor of the Tang Dynasty
- Mojmir I, king of Moravia (approximate date)
- Niall Caille, High King of Ireland
- Reginbert of Reichenau, German librarian
- Seguin II, Frankish nobleman
- Wang, concubine of Wu Zong

== Sources ==
- Goldberg, Eric J. (2006). Struggle for Empire: Kingship and Conflict under Louis the German, 817-876. Ithaca, NY: Cornell University Press. ISBN 9780801438905.
