= 904 =

Calendar year

904 in various calendars
Gregorian calendar	904; CMIV
Ab urbe condita	1657
Armenian calendar	353; ԹՎ ՅԾԳ
Assyrian calendar	5654
Balinese saka calendar	825–826
Bengali calendar	310–311
Berber calendar	1854
Buddhist calendar	1448
Burmese calendar	266
Byzantine calendar	6412–6413
Chinese calendar	癸亥年 (Water Pig); 3601 or 3394 — to — 甲子年 (Wood Rat); 3602 or 3395
Coptic calendar	620–621
Discordian calendar	2070
Ethiopian calendar	896–897
Hebrew calendar	4664–4665
- Hindu calendars
Vikram Samvat	960–961
Shaka Samvat	825–826
Kali Yuga	4004–4005
Holocene calendar	10904
Iranian calendar	282–283
Islamic calendar	291–292
Japanese calendar	Engi 4 (延喜４年)
Javanese calendar	803–804
Julian calendar	904; CMIV
Korean calendar	3237
Minguo calendar	1008 before ROC 民前1008年
Nanakshahi calendar	−564
Seleucid era	1215/1216 AG
Thai solar calendar	1446–1447
Tibetan calendar	ཆུ་མོ་ཕག་ལོ་ (female Water-Boar); 1030 or 649 or −123 — to — ཤིང་ཕོ་བྱི་བ་ལོ་ (male Wood-Rat); 1031 or 650 or −122

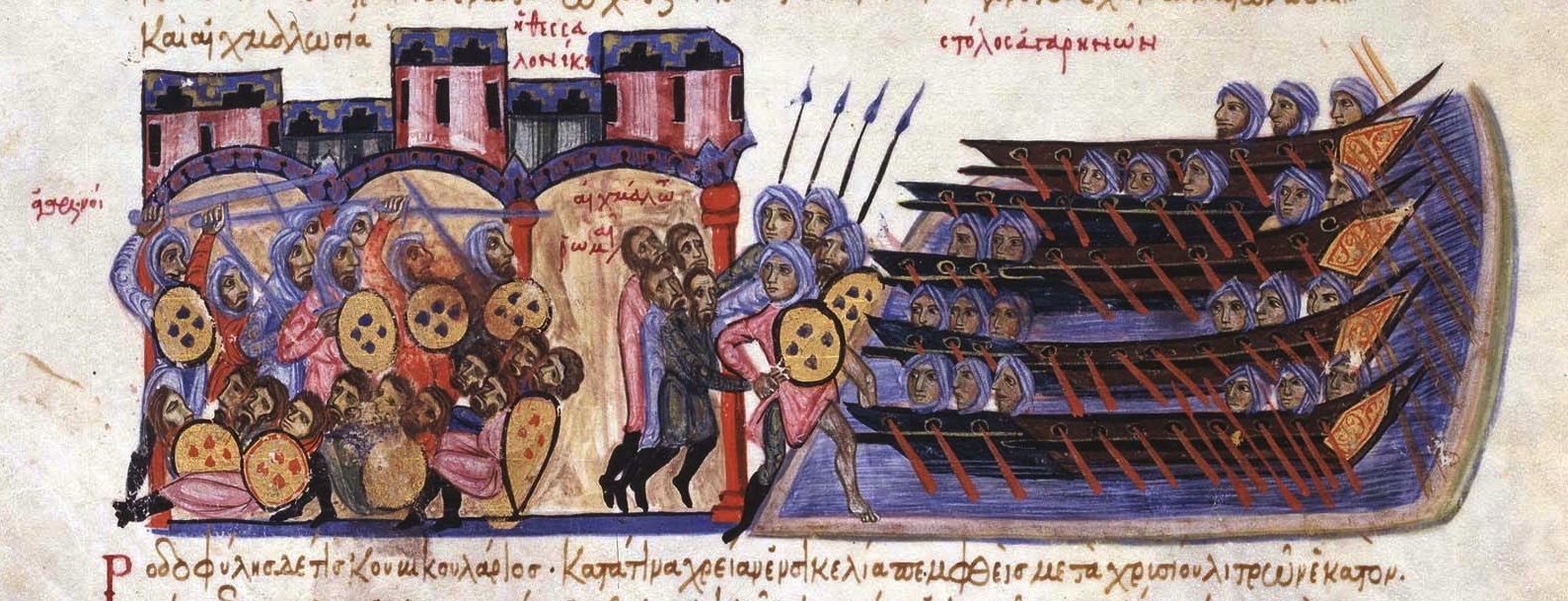
Saracen raiders sack Thessalonica (904)

Year 904 (CMIV) was a leap year starting on Sunday of the Julian calendar.

== Events ==
=== By place ===
==== Byzantine Empire ====
- July 29 – Sack of Thessalonica: A Muslim fleet, led by the Greek renegade Leo of Tripoli, appears outside Thessalonica and begins its attack after a short and silent inspection of the fortification of the city. After attacks from the sea for two days, the Saracens are able to storm the city walls, overcome the Thessalonians' resistance and capture the city. The sacking continues for a full week, before the raiders depart for their base in the Levant. Having freed 4,000 Muslim prisoners and captured 60 ships, gaining a large loot, they carry off 22,000 men and women as slaves.
- Arab–Byzantine War: The Byzantines under Andronikos Doukas, along with Eustathios Argyros, campaign against the Abbasids and defeat the Muslim garrisons of Mopsuestia and Tarsus, near Marash (modern Turkey).
- Emperor Leo VI (the Wise) is forced to sign a peace treaty with Simeon I, ruler (knyaz) of the Bulgarian Empire. All Slavic-inhabited lands of Macedonia and southern Albania are ceded to the Bulgarians.

==== Europe ====
- Summer – King Louis IV (the Child) invites Kurszán, a Hungarian leader (gyula) of the Magyar tribal confederation, and his entourage to negotiate at the Fischa River, but they are killed in an ambush.
- In Portugal, for the third time in less than 30 years, the Christians take control of Coimbra, this time for almost a century.
- Beginning of the Saeculum obscurum ('Dark Age'), a period of 60 years in which the papacy was heavily influenced by the powerful Theophylacti family, the counts of Tusculum.

==== Britain ====
- Prince Hywel ap Cadell of Seisyllwg (Wales) marries Princess Elen of Dyfed. The latter's father, King Llywarch ap Hyfaidd, dies. The throne of Dyfed is claimed by Llywarch's brother, Rhodri ap Hyfaidd, but he is probably forced to flee from Hywel's armies.

==== Arabian Empire ====
- Winter – Shayban ibn Ahmad ibn Tulun succeeds his nephew Harun ibn Khumarawayh as emir of the Tulunid dynasty, who is killed in a mutiny during the invasion of Egypt by the Abbasid Caliphate.

==== China ====
- September 22 – The warlord Zhu Quanzhong kills Emperor Zhao Zong, along with his family and many ministers, after seizing control of the imperial government. Zhu places Zhao Zong's 13-year-old son Ai (Li Zhou) on the imperial throne as a puppet ruler of the Tang dynasty.
- Zhu Quanzhong has Chang'an, the capital of the Tang dynasty and the largest city in the ancient world, destroyed, and moves the materials to Luoyang, which becomes the new capital.

=== By topic ===
==== Religion ====
- January 29 – Pope Sergius III succeeds Leo V and the deposed Antipope Christopher (both of whom are murdered or exiled) as the 119th pope of the Catholic Church. The ascension of Sergius marks the beginning of the Pornocracy ('rule of the whores'), which will last for 150 years. During this time, the clergy will be sidelined and rule over Rome is dominated by the Roman nobility.
- Sergius III allies himself with Theophylact I, count of Tusculum, who becomes ruler of Rome and the papal administration. Sergius rewards him (for his support and rise of power) with the position of sacri palatii vestararius and essentially becomes his puppet.

== Births ==
- September 10 – Guo Wei, emperor of Later Zhou (d. 954)
- Æthelwold, bishop of Winchester (or 909)
- Egill Skallagrímsson, Viking warrior and poet (approximate date)
- Yongming Yanshou, Chinese Zen master (d. 975)

== Deaths ==
- September 22 – Zhao Zong, emperor of the Tang dynasty (b. 867)
- Abu'l-Abbas Ahmad ibn al-Furat, Abbasid official
- Al-Husayn ibn Zikrawayh, Qarmatian leader
- Al-Qasim ibn Ubayd Allah, Abbasid vizier
- Christopher, antipope of the Catholic Church
- Cui Yin, chancellor of the Tang dynasty (b. 854)
- Du Xunhe, Chinese poet (b. 846)
- Erenfried I, Frankish nobleman
- Harun ibn Khumarawayh, Tulunid emir
- Ímar ua Ímair, Norse king of Dublin
- John the Old Saxon, abbot of Athelney
- Ki no Tomonori, Japanese poet (approximate date)
- Kurszán, ruler (gyula) of the Magyars
- Lady Zhang, wife of Zhu Quanzhong
- Leo V, pope of the Catholic Church
- Li Shenfu, general of the Tang dynasty
- Llywarch ap Hyfaidd, king of Dyfed (Wales)
- Tannet of Pagan, king of Burma (b. 859)
- Wigmund, bishop of Dorchester (approximate date)
- Zhang Jun, chancellor of the Tang dynasty
