= 772 =

Calendar year

772 in various calendars
- Gregorian calendar: 772; DCCLXXII
- Ab urbe condita: 1525
- Armenian calendar: 221; ԹՎ ՄԻԱ
- Assyrian calendar: 5522
- Balinese saka calendar: 693–694
- Bengali calendar: 178–179
- Berber calendar: 1722
- Buddhist calendar: 1316
- Burmese calendar: 134
- Byzantine calendar: 6280–6281
- Chinese calendar: 辛亥年 (Metal Pig); 3469 or 3262 — to — 壬子年 (Water Rat); 3470 or 3263
- Coptic calendar: 488–489
- Discordian calendar: 1938
- Ethiopian calendar: 764–765
- Hebrew calendar: 4532–4533
- Hindu calendars
- Vikram Samvat: 828–829
- Shaka Samvat: 693–694
- Kali Yuga: 3872–3873
- Holocene calendar: 10772
- Iranian calendar: 150–151
- Islamic calendar: 155–156
- Japanese calendar: Hōki 3 (宝亀３年)
- Javanese calendar: 666–667
- Julian calendar: 772; DCCLXXII
- Korean calendar: 3105
- Minguo calendar: 1140 before ROC 民前1140年
- Nanakshahi calendar: −696
- Seleucid era: 1083/1084 AG
- Thai solar calendar: 1314–1315
- Tibetan calendar: ལྕགས་མོ་ཕག་ལོ་ (female Iron-Boar); 898 or 517 or −255 — to — ཆུ་ཕོ་བྱི་བ་ལོ་ (male Water-Rat); 899 or 518 or −254

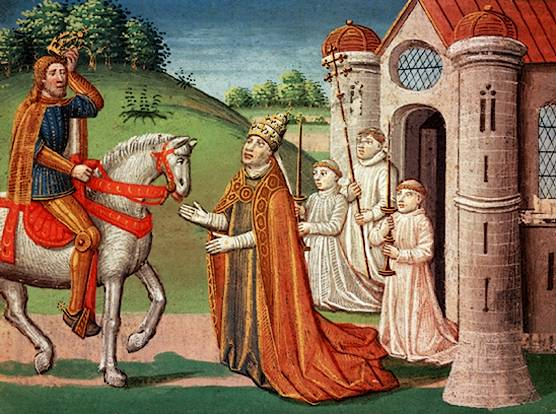
Charlemagne and pope Adrian I (772–795)

Year 772 (DCCLXXII) was a leap year starting on Wednesday of the Julian calendar. The denomination 772 for this year has been used since the early medieval period, when the Anno Domini calendar era became the prevalent method in Europe for naming years.

== Events ==
=== By place ===
==== Europe ====
- Saxon Wars: King Charlemagne leads a Frankish expedition from the Middle Rhine into disputed territory lost by the Franks in 695. He starts a campaign against the Saxons and seizes Eresburg, destroying the Irminsul (Saxon sacred tree) near Paderborn. Charlemagne devastates several major Saxon strongholds, and forces them to retreat beyond the Weser River. After negotiating with some Saxon nobles and obtaining hostages, he installs a number of garrisons.
- King Desiderius of the Lombards, enraged by the repudiation by Charlemagne of his daughter Desiderata, proclaims Gerberga's sons lawful heirs to the Frankish throne. He attacks Pope Adrian I for refusing to crown them, and invades the Duchy of the Pentapolis. Desiderius marches on Rome, and Adrian turns to the Franks for military support.
- In England, King Offa of Mercia attempts to rule Kent directly, possibly to depose his rival Egbert II (approximate date).

==== Asia ====
- Abbasid caliph Al-Mansur completes construction of the garrison city of al-Rāfiqah adjacent to Raqqa.

=== By topic ===
==== Religion ====
- January 24 – Pope Stephen III dies after a 3½-year reign, in which he has approved the acceptable reverence of icons in the Eastern Church. On February 1 he is succeeded by Adrian I (also referred to as Hadrian) as the 95th pope of Rome.

== Births ==
- Bai Juyi, Chinese poet and official (d. 846)
- Cui Qun, Chinese Chancellor of the Tang dynasty (d. 832)
- Cui Zhi, Chinese Chancellor of the Tang dynasty (d. 829)
- Li Ao, Chinese philosopher and prose writer (d. 841)
- Liu Yuxi, Chinese poet and philosopher (d. 842)
- probable – Charles the Younger, son of Charlemagne (d. 811)

== Deaths ==
- February 1 – Pope Stephen III
- May 13 – Dōkyō, Japanese Buddhist monk (b. 700)
- July 10 – Amalberga of Temse, Lotharingian nun and saint (b. 741)
- date unknown
  - Dúngal mac Cellaig, king of Osraige (Ireland)
  - Remigius of Rouen, archbishop, illegitimate son of Charles Martel
  - Yuan Jie, Chinese poet
  - Zhu Xicai, Chinese general of the Tang dynasty
