= 9th century =

One hundred years, from 801 to 900

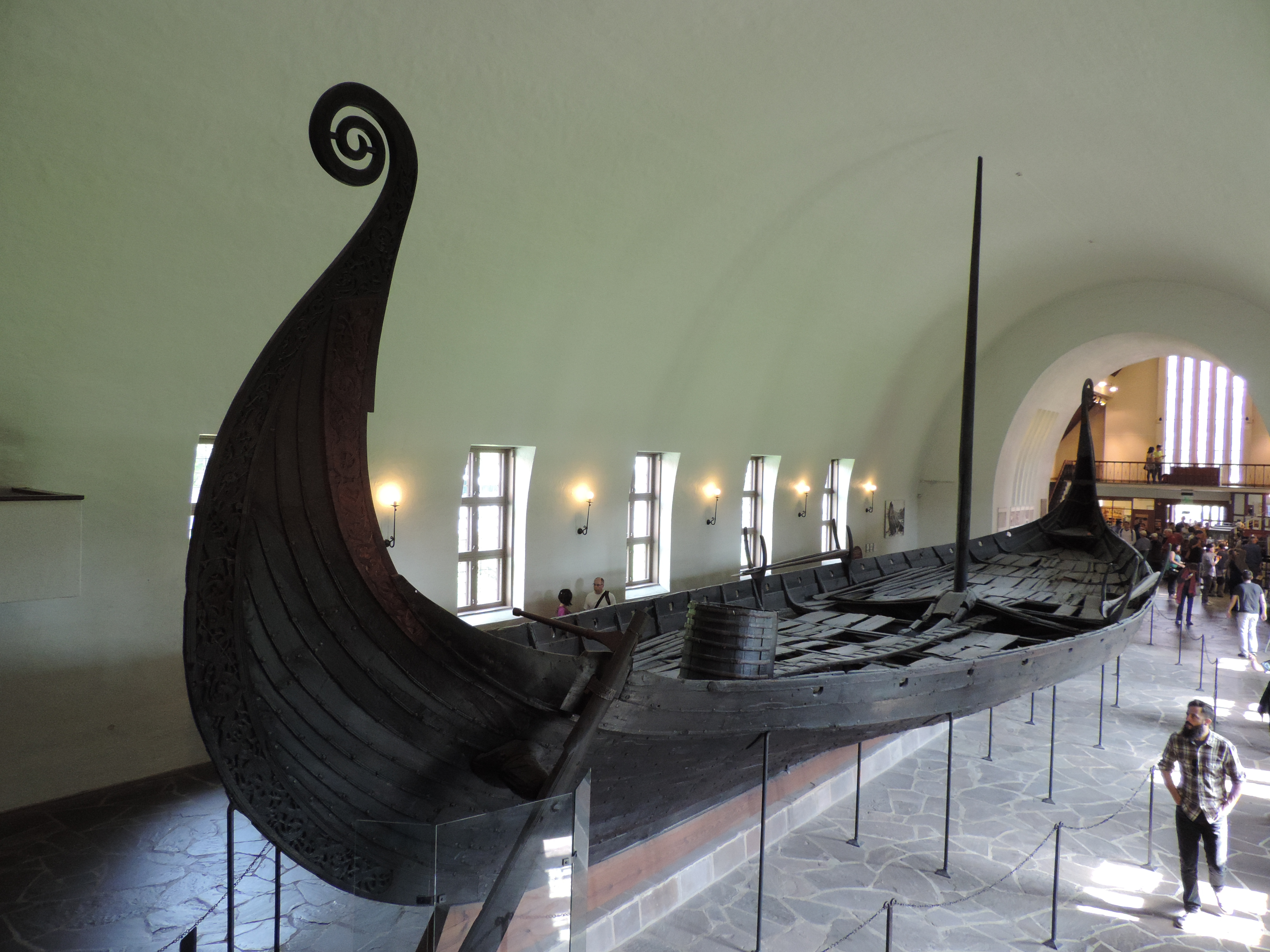
Viking Longship, used by the Norse Raiders during the Viking Age.

The 9th century was a period from 801 (represented by the Roman numerals DCCCI) through 900 (CM) in accordance with the Julian calendar.

The Carolingian Renaissance and the Viking raids occurred within this period. In the Middle East, the House of Wisdom was founded in Abbasid Baghdad, attracting many scholars to the city. The field of algebra was founded by the Muslim polymath al-Khwarizmi. The most famous Islamic scholar Ahmad ibn Hanbal was tortured and imprisoned by Abbasid official Ahmad ibn Abi Du'ad during the reign of Abbasid caliph al-Mu'tasim and caliph al-Wathiq. In Southeast Asia, the Mataram kingdom reached its zenith, while Burma would see the establishment of the major kingdom of Pagan. Tang China started the century with the effective rule of Emperor Xianzong and ended it with the Huang Chao Rebellion. In America, the Maya experienced widespread political collapse in the central Maya region, resulting in internecine warfare, the abandonment of cities, and a northward shift of population.

== West Africa ==
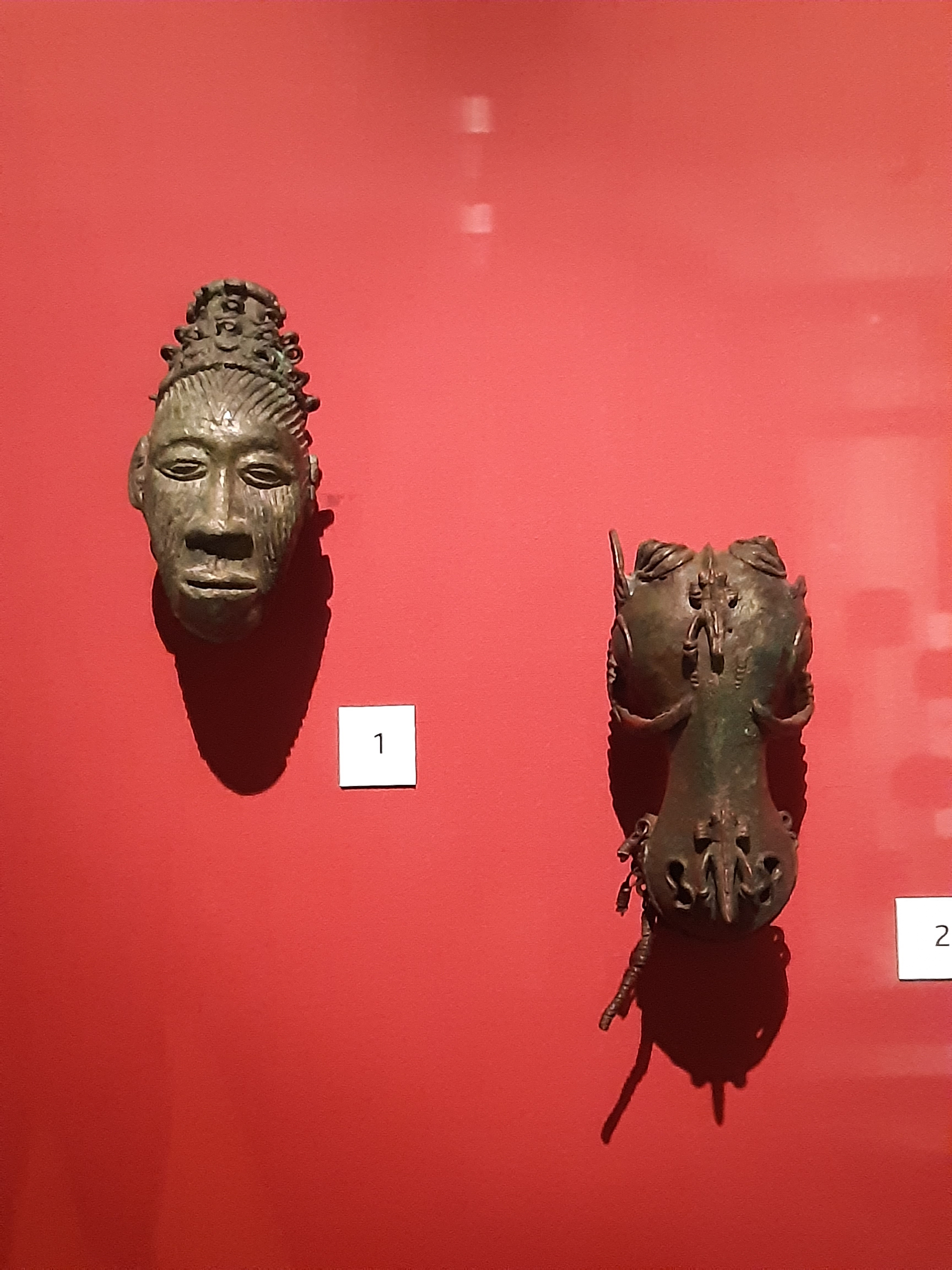
Bronzes made around the 9th century, some of the bronzes found at Igbo-Ukwu.

=== Southeastern Nigeria ===
Around the 9th century, the Igbo people of what is now southern Nigeria developed bronze casts of humans, animals, and legendary creatures. These bronzes, which were used as vessels, amulets, pendants, and sacrificial tools, are among the earliest made bronzes ever found in Nigeria. Most items were part of a burial of a nobleman culture in the northern part of the Igboland.

=== Ghana Empire ===
The Ghana (Wagadu) Empire (before c. 830 until c. 1235) was located in what is now southeastern Mauritania and western Mali. It is considered the first of the Sahelian Kingdoms, which would exist in some form until the early 20th century.

== Western Europe ==
=== Britain and Ireland ===
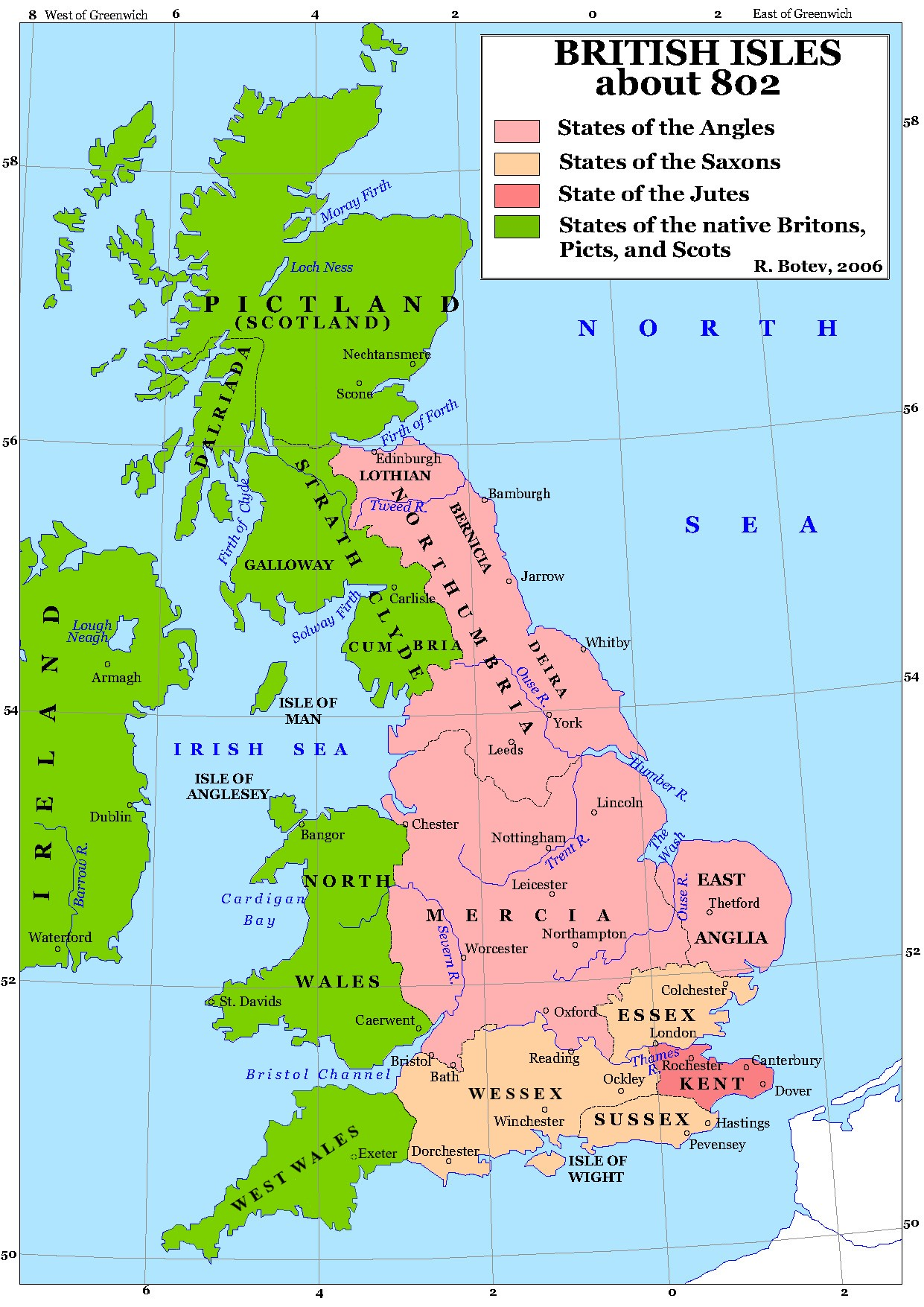
Map of Britain in 802

England in 878

Britain experienced a great influx of Viking peoples in the 9th century as the Viking Age continued from the previous century. The kingdoms of the Heptarchy were gradually conquered by the Danes, who set up Anglo-Saxon puppet rulers in each kingdom. This invasion was achieved by a huge military force known as the Great Heathen Army, which was supposedly led by Ivar the Boneless, Halfdan Ragnarsson, and Guthrum. This Danish army first arrived in Britain in 865 in East Anglia. After conquering that kingdom, the army proceeded to capture the city of York (Jorvik) and establish the kingdom of Jorvik. The Danes went on to subjugate the kingdom of Northumbria and to take all but the western portion of Mercia. The remaining kingdom of Wessex was the only kingdom of the Heptarchy left. Alfred the Great managed to maintain his kingdom of Wessex and push back the Viking incursions, relieving the neighbouring kingdoms from the threat of the Danes following his famous victory over them at the Battle of Ethandun in 878. Alfred re-established Anglo-Saxon rule over the western half of Mercia, and the Danelaw was established which separated Mercia into halves, the eastern half remaining under the control of the Danes.

Ireland was also affected by the Viking expansion across the North Sea. Extensive raids were carried out all along the coast and eventually, permanent settlements were established, such as that of Dublin in 841. Particular targets for these raids were the monasteries on the western coast of Ireland, as they provided a rich source for loot. On such raids the Vikings set up impermanent camps, which were called longphorts by the Irish—this period of Viking raids on the coasts of Ireland has been named the longphort phase after these types of settlements. Ireland in the 9th century was organised into an amalgam of small kingdoms, called tuatha. These kingdoms were sometimes grouped together and ruled by a single, provincial ruler. If such a ruler could establish and maintain authority over a portion of these tuatha, he was sometimes granted the title of High King.

Scotland also experienced significant Viking incursions during the 9th century. The Vikings established themselves in coastal regions, usually in northern Scotland, and in the northern islands such as Orkney and Shetland. The Viking invasion and settlement in Scotland provided a contributing factor in the collapse of the kingdoms of the Picts, who inhabited most of Scotland at the time. Not only were the Pictish realms either destroyed or severely weakened, the Viking invasion and settlements may have been the reason for the movement of Kenneth MacAlpin, the king of Dál Riata at that time. The kingdom of Dál Riata was located on the western coast of Scotland, and Viking incursions destroyed it after the death of its previous king, Áed mac Boanta in 839, according to the Annals of Ulster. This may have caused the new king, MacAlpin, to move to the east, and conquer the remnants of the Pictish realms. MacAlpin became king of the Picts in 843 and later kings would be titled as the King of Alba or King of Scots.

=== Art ===
Art in the 9th century was primarily dedicated to the Gospel and employed as basic tools of liturgy of the Roman Catholic Church. Thousands of golden art objects were made: Sacred cups, vessels, reliquaries, crucifixes, rosaries, altarpieces, and statues of the Virgin and Child or Saints all kept the flame of western art from dying out. Architecture began to revive to some extent in the West by the 9th century, taking the form of Church facilities of all kinds, and the first castle fortifications since Roman times began to take form in simple "moat and bailey" castles, or simple "strong point" tower structures, with little refinement.

== Events ==
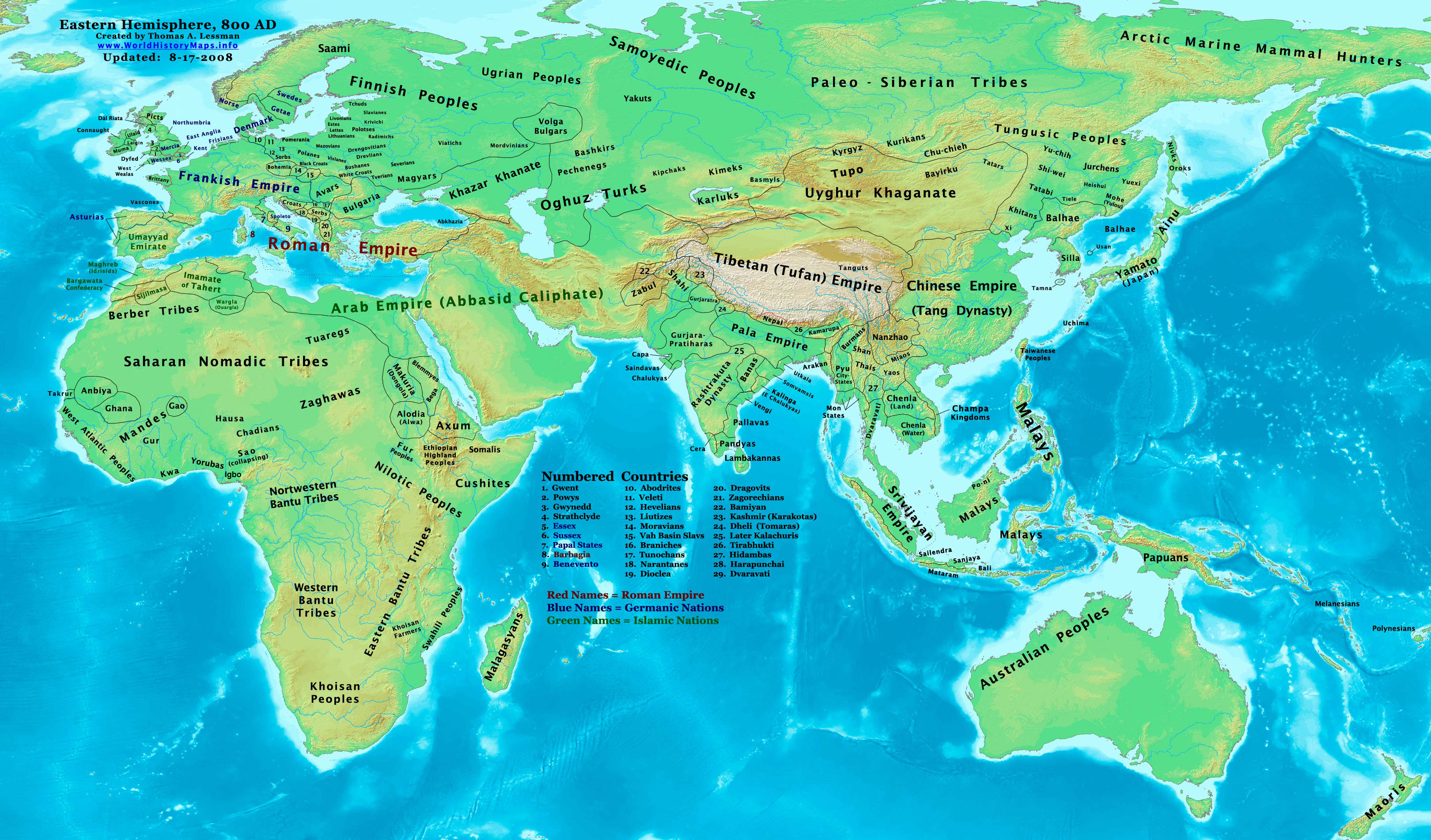
Eastern Hemisphere at the beginning of the 9th century.

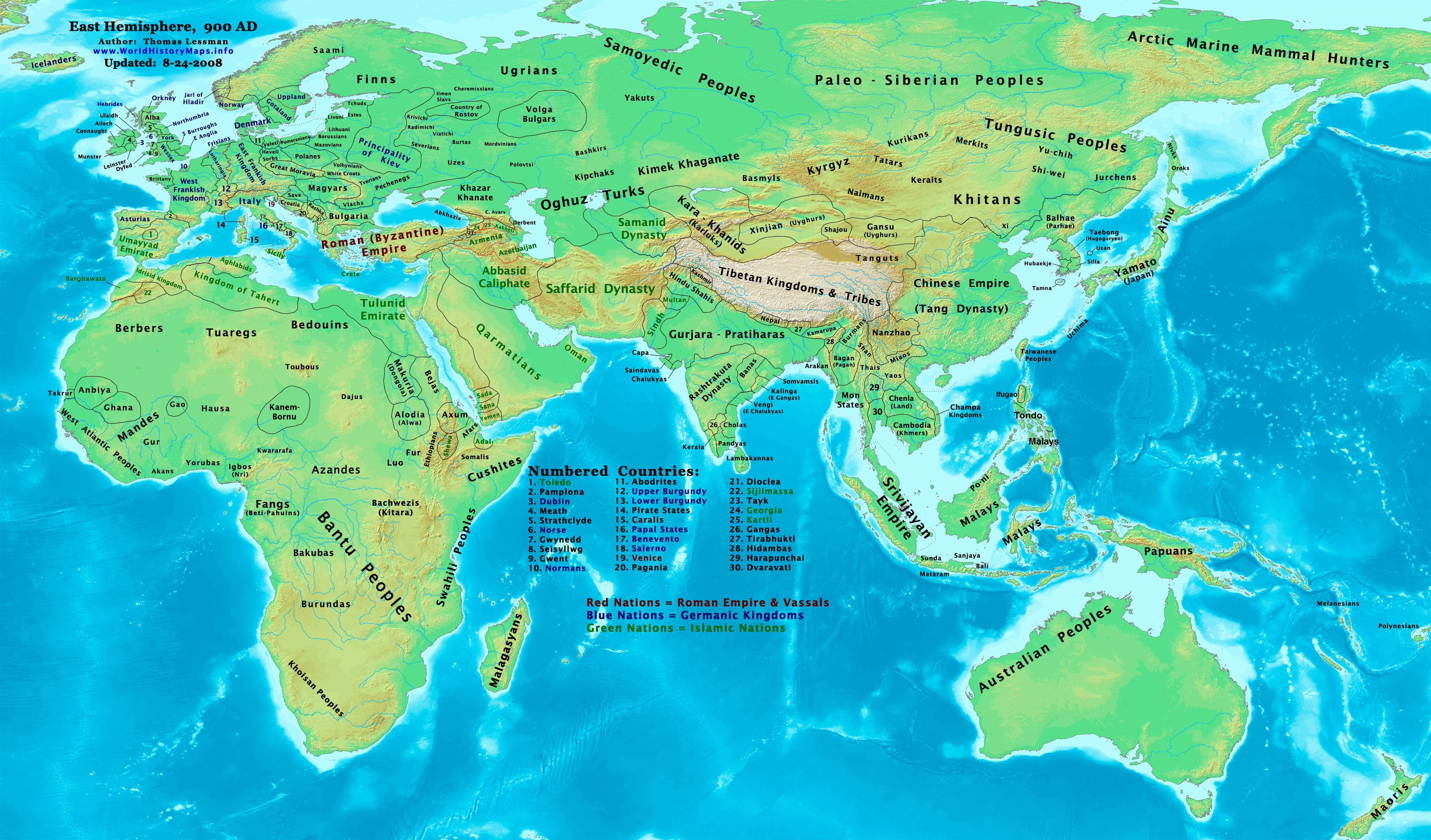
Eastern Hemisphere at the end of the 9th century.

- 800s: Southeast Asian kingdoms of Muja (then pagan Brunei/Vijayapura) and Mayd (Ma-i) waged war against the Chinese Empire.
- 802: Jayavarman II of the Khmer people in Cambodia founds the Khmer empire and establishes the Angkorian dynasty.
- 803: Construction on the Leshan Giant Buddha in Tang dynasty China is complete, after 90 years of rock-carving on a massive cliff-side.
- 805–820: Tang dynasty was under the rule of Emperor Xianzong of Tang.
- 809–815: War between the Byzantine Empire and Bulgaria.
- 811: Battle of Pliska fought between a Byzantine force led by emperor Nicephorus I and a Bulgarian army commanded by Khan Krum. Byzantines are defeated in a series of engagements, culminating with the death of Nicephorus I.
- 813: Byzantines are heavily defeated by the Bulgars at Versinikia.
- c. 813 – c. 915: Period of serious Arab naval raids on shores of Tyrrhenian and Adriatic seas.
- 814: Charlemagne dies in the city of Aachen.
- 815: A 30-year peace agreement is signed between Bulgaria and the Byzantine Empire.
- 820: Muḥammad ibn Mūsā al-Khwārizmī writes his treatise on Algebra The Compendious Book on Calculation by Completion and Balancing.
- 824: Han Yu dies.
- 825: Battle of Ellandun: King Egbert of Wessex defeats Mercia and establishes the kingdom of Wessex as the supreme Kingdom in England.
- 825: Borobudur is completed during the reign of Samaratungga.

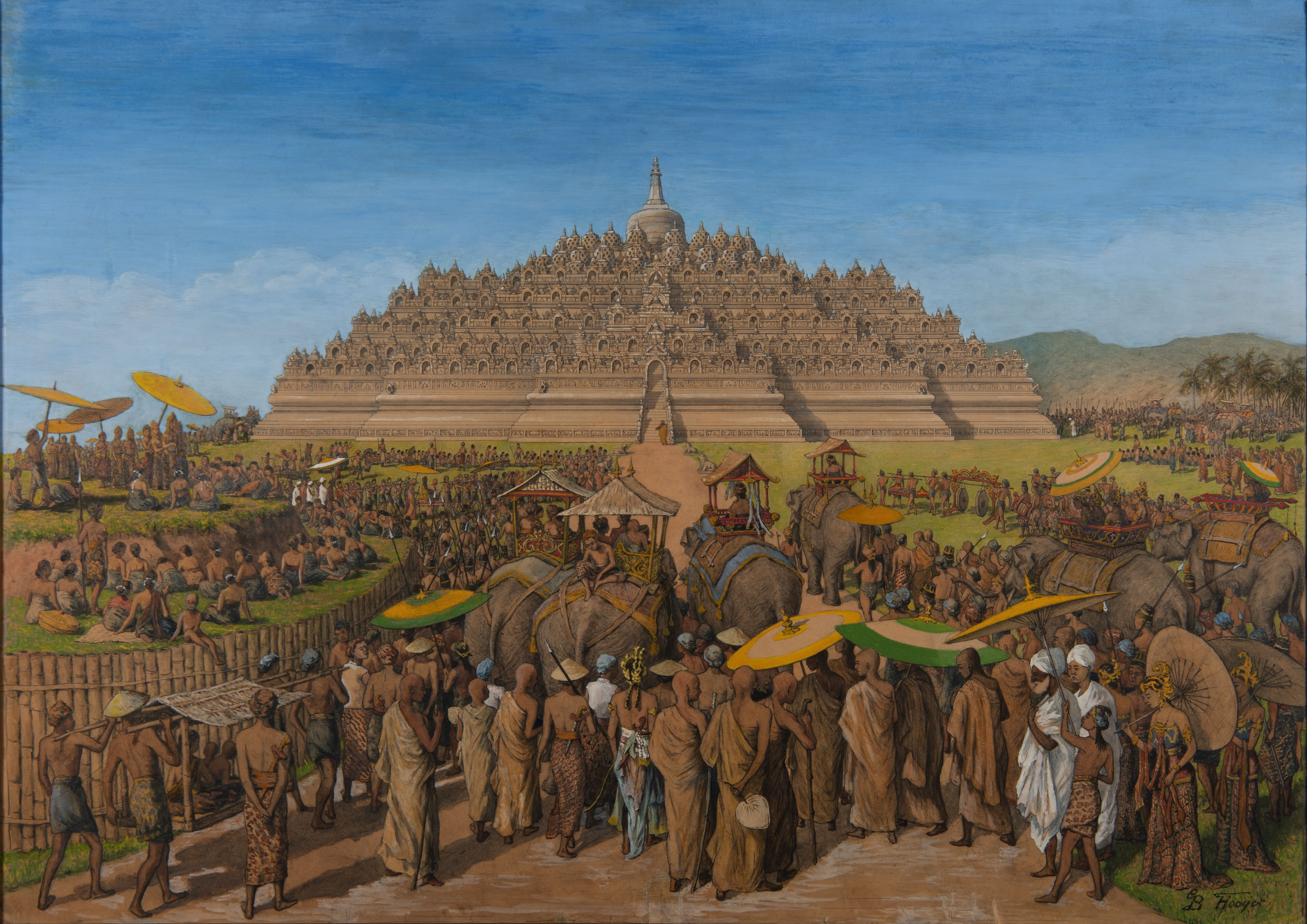
Borobudur was likely founded around 800. This corresponds to the period between 760 and 830, the peak of the Sailendra dynasty in central Java, when it was under the influence of the Srivijayan Empire. The construction has been estimated to have taken 75 years and been completed during the reign of Samaratungga in 825.

- 827–902: Aghlabids established emirate (province) in Sicily and subsequently raids Southern Italy.
- 830: The Ghana (Wagadu) Empire is established.
- 830: The House of Wisdom, a library and translation institute established in Baghdad by al-Ma'mun, Abbasid caliph, to transfer the knowledge of Greeks, Persians, Indians, etc. to the Muslim world. The Compendious Book on Calculation by Completion and Balancing, a book of algebra, is also written there by Al-Khwarizmi.
- 835: Sweet Dew Incident occurs. Emperor Wenzong of the Tang dynasty conspires to kill the powerful eunuchs of the Tang court, but the plot is foiled.
- 835: Zacharias III of Makuria sent his 20-year old son Georgios I to Baghdad as an envoy to negotiate The treaty of baqt and was successful in convincing caliph al-Mu'tasim to reduce the baqt payment of slaves to 200 instead of 400 and to once every three years in exchange to reducing the abbasids payment of textiles and jewellery and wheat and many more to 10 caravans instead of 15.
- 839–842: Vlastimir defeats Presian.
- 840: Death of Louis the Pious.
- 841: Dublin is founded on the east coast of Ireland by the Vikings.
- 842: Samaale becomes chief of the Hashiyah clan and launches the conquest of Somalia. This paves the way for Hashiyic colonisation of the Peninsular, displacing the native Cushitic peoples of Somalia
- 843: The Carolingian Empire is at its height in territory and area. The three sons of Louis the Pious reach an agreement known as the Treaty of Verdun and split the Carolingian Empire into three divisions; East Francia was given to Louis the German, West Francia to Charles the Bald and Middle Francia to Lothair I.
- 844: The first Viking raid in Iberia.
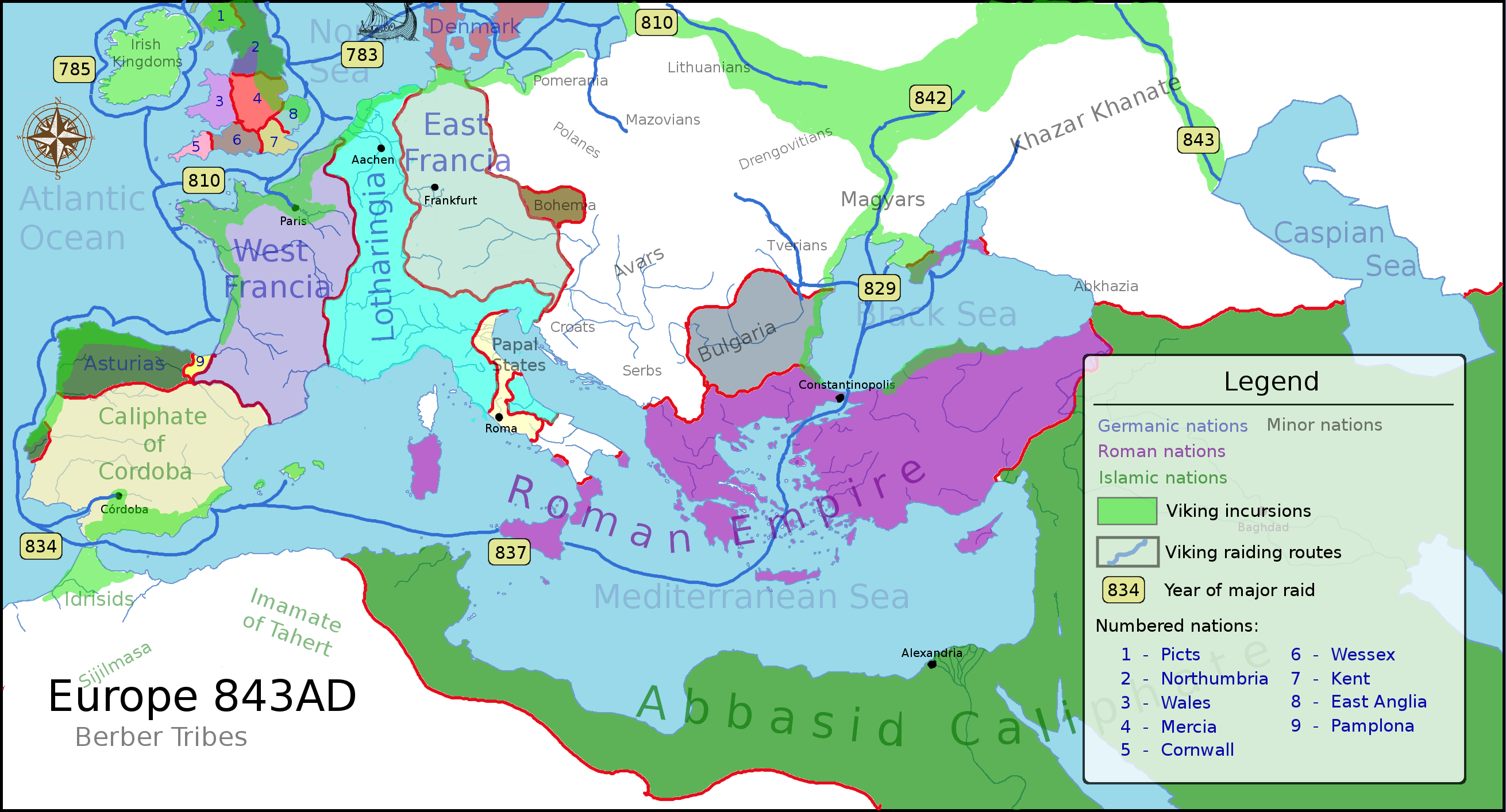
  Viking raids and division of the Frankish Empire at the Treaty of Verdun in 843
- 845: Buddhism is persecuted and banned in China.
- 846–859: Emperor Xuānzong of Tang reigned. He was considered the last capable emperor of the Tang dynasty.
- 846: 11,000 Saracen Arab squadrons from Africa, with 500 horses, desecrate Christian shrines in Rome, including the tombs and basilicas of Sts. Peter and Paul.
- 848–852: The west bank of the Tiber is annexed into the city of Rome. A defensive wall, commissioned by Pope Leo IV, is built around what came to be called the Leonine City as a defensive response to the Saracen desecration of Rome in 846.
- 850–875: The first Norse settlers arrive on Iceland.
- 850s: The Muslim Berber dynasty Banu Isam is founded in Ceuta.
- 851: The Arab merchant Sulaiman al-Tajir visits the Chinese seaport at Guangzhou in southern China, and observes the manufacturing of porcelain, the Islamic mosque built at Guangzhou, the granary system of the city, and how its municipal administration functioned.
- 856: Prambanan is completed. According to the Shivagrha inscription, Rakai Pikatan — the husband of Pramodhawardhani — defeated Balaputra.
- 859: Muslims establish the University of Al Karaouine as a madrasa in Fez, Morocco.
- 860: Balaputra, the maharaja of Suvarnadvipa and the ruler of Srivijaya, constructs the Buddhist temple and monastery in Nalanda India, on the land given by King Devapaladeva. of Pala in Benggala, according to the Nalanda inscription.
- 861: Assassination of Abbasid caliph al-Mutawakkil (r. 847–861) and decline of the Abbasid Caliphate.
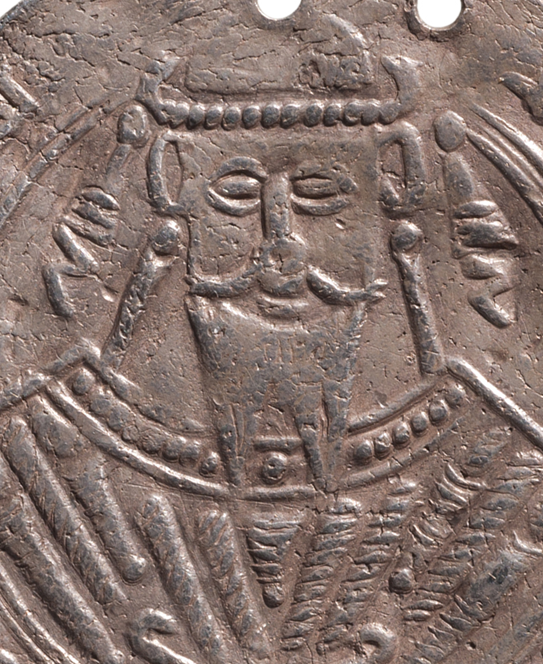
  Coin issued during al-Mutawakkil's reign in the mid-9th century
- 862: The beginning of the Rurik dynasty in Rus'.
- 863: The Chinese author Duan Chengshi describes the slave trade, ivory trade, and ambergris trade of Somalia in East Africa.
- 862: The Bagratuni dynasty of Medieval Armenia begins with Ashot I.
- 863–879: Period of schism between Eastern and Western churches.
- 864: Christianization of Bulgaria under Boris I
- 867: Onward revival of the Byzantine Empire under the Macedonian dynasty.
- 868: Ahmad ibn Tulun breaks away from the Abbasid Caliphate and establishes the independent Tulunid dynasty, first Egyptian independent state since the Ptolemaic Kingdom.
- 868: First known printed book, the Diamond Sutra, printed in China using woodblock printing.
- 869: An earthquake and tsunami struck Japan's Sanriku coast, killing 1,000 people.
- 869–883: Zanj Rebellion against the Abbasids
- 870: Christianization of the Serbs.
- 870: Prague Castle founded.
- 871–899: Reign of Alfred the Great, the first king of the English.

Extent of Egyptian domains during Khumarawayh's reign in the late-9th century

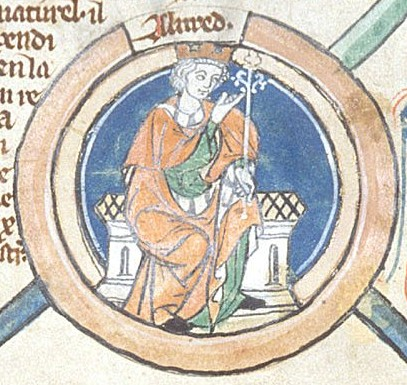
Alfred the Great led Wessex at its height in the 9th century

- 872: Iceland settled by Ingolfur Arnarson from Norway.
- 875–884: Huang Chao leads an unsuccessful rebellion against the Tang dynasty in China.
- 878: Battle of Ethandun results in the victory of Alfred the Great over the Danish warlord Guthrum.
- 885: Arrival of the disciples of Saints Cyril and Methodius, Clement of Ohrid and Naum of Preslav in Bulgaria. Development of the Cyrillic Alphabet.
- 885: Egyptian Tulunid army defeats the Abbasid army in the Battle of Tawahin, Egypt maintains autonomy.
- 885: Abbo Cernuus becomes witness to the Siege of Paris by Vikings.
- 888: The Carolingian Empire declines and falls after the death of Charles the Fat.
- 893: Council of Preslav - Vladimir-Rasate is dethroned and succeeded as Prince of Bulgaria by Simeon I; the capital is moved from Pliska to Preslav; the Byzantine clergy is expelled and replaced by Bulgarian; Old Bulgarian becomes the official language of the country.
- 895/896: The year of the Magyars arrival in Pannonia. This year is widely accepted as the beginning of the Hungarian "Landtaking".
- 899: King Alfred the Great of Wessex, First King of The English, dies.
- 900: The oldest text discovered in the Philippines—an acquittance document in Old Javanese—is inscribed on a copperplate in Luzon. The acquittance took place on 21 April 900 and involved several aristocrats and high-ranking officials from kingdoms within the islands of Luzon, Mindanao, and Java. The document is currently called the Laguna copperplate inscription.
- Late 9th century: Bulgaria stretches from the mouth of the Danube to Epirus and Bosnia.
- Late 9th century: Pallava dynasty ends in Southern India.
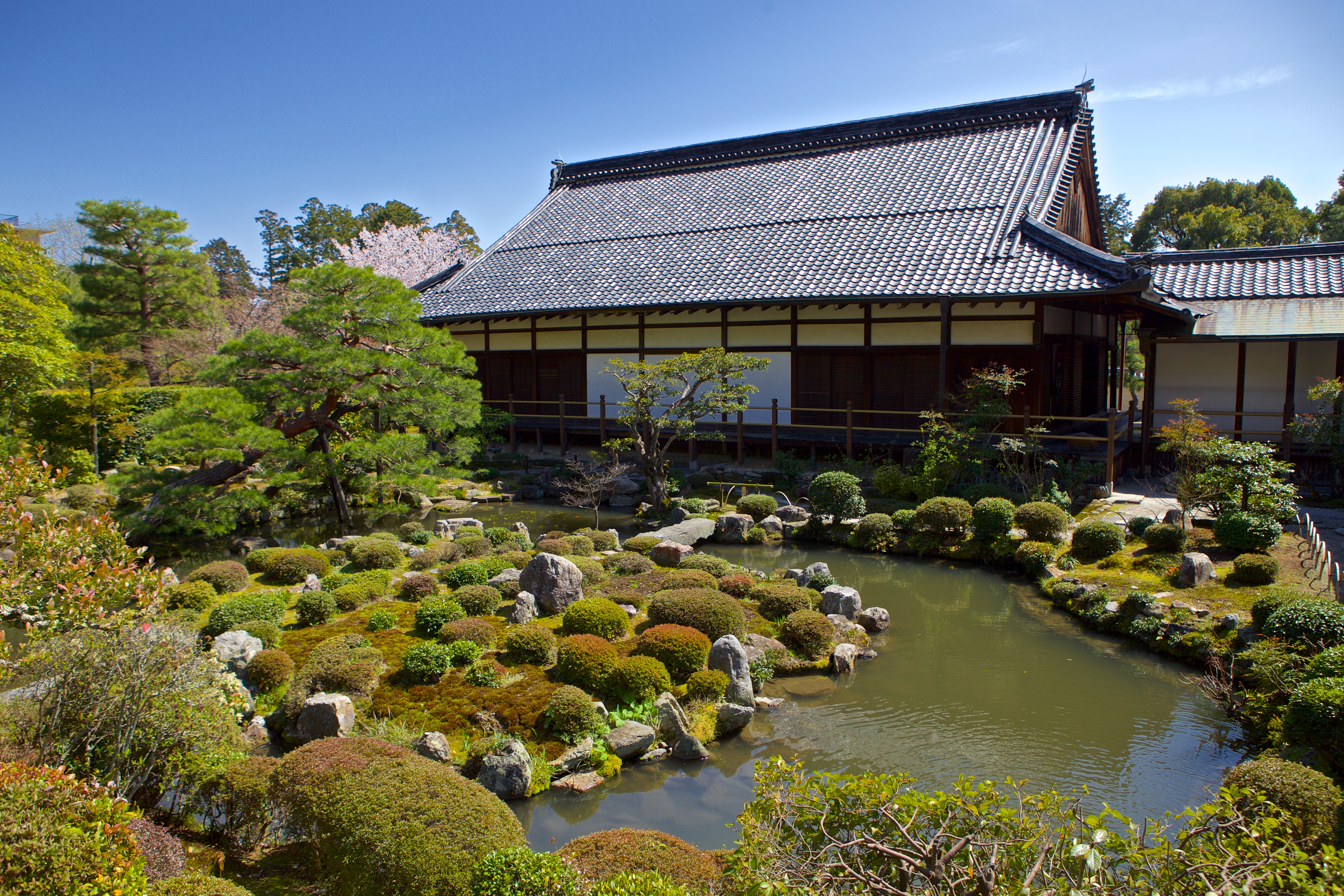
  To-ji in Kyoto, completed in the late 9th century
- Late 9th century: Womb World mandala, To-ji, Kyoto, is made. Heian period.

=== Unknown date ===
- Reign of Charlemagne, and concurrent (and controversially labeled) Carolingian Renaissance in Western Europe.
- An unknown event causes the decline of the Maya Classical Era.
- Beowulf might have been written down in this century; alternatively, it could also have been in the 8th century.
- Large-scale Viking attacks on Europe begin, devastating countless numbers of people.
- Oseberg ship burial.
- The Magyars begin their conquest of Pannonia (roughly modern-day Hungary), a process that will take several decades to be completed.
- The Tukolor settle in the Senegal river valley.
- Muslim traders settle in the northwest and southeast of Madagascar.
- In Italy, some cities became free republics: for instance Forlì, in 889.
- The Christian Nubian kingdom reaches its peak of prosperity and military power. (Early history of Sudan).
- Harald Fairhair was victorious at the Battle of Hafrsfjord, and Norway was unified into one kingdom.
- The Medieval Warm Period begins.
- The Coptic period, at its most broad definition, ends.
- Page from Koran (Surah II:286 and title Surah III) in kufic script, from Syria, is made. Now kept at The Metropolitan Museum of Art, New York.

== Inventions, discoveries, introductions ==
- Algebra by Al-Khwarizmi
- Quadratic equations: Indian mathematician Śrīdharācārya derived the quadratic formula used for solving quadratic equations.
- First image of a rotary grindstone in a European source—illustration shows crank, first known use of a crank in the West (Utrecht Psalter, 843)
- Invention of gunpowder by Chinese Taoist Alchemists.
- Chess reaches Japan.
- Vulgar Latin begins to develop into various Romance languages.
- Two syllabaries or kana are developed from simplified Chinese characters in Japan.
- The Tibetan Script had its third and last orthographical reform.

== See also ==
- Timeline of 9th-century Muslim history

== Bibliography ==
- Comans, Michael (2000), The Method of Early Advaita Vedānta: A Study of Gauḍapāda, Śaṅkara, Sureśvara, and Padmapāda, Delhi: Motilal Banarsidass
- Sharma, Chandradhar (1962). Indian Philosophy: A Critical Survey. New York: Barnes & Noble.
