= Consort Yang (Wenzong) =

Consort Yang, imperial consort rank Xianfei (楊賢妃, personal name unknown) (died February 12, 840), was an imperial consort of the Chinese Tang dynasty. She was a concubine of Emperor Wenzong who became involved in the selection process of his heir and who died as a result of her involvement.

== Background ==
Little is known about Consort Yang's background, as there was no biography of her among the biographies of the empresses and imperial consorts in either the Old Book of Tang or the New Book of Tang. However, in an allegation that Emperor Wenzong's brother Emperor Wuzong later made against her (posthumously) and the chancellor Yang Sifu, Emperor Wuzong stated that Yang Sifu had written a letter to her urging her to assume regency as an empress dowager in which Yang Sifu referred to her as an aunt. This allegation, if true, would suggest that she was a daughter of Yang Sifu's grandfather Yang Taiqing (楊太清), who served as a county magistrate, and a sister to Yang Sifu's father Yang Yuling (楊於陵), who was an honored official during the reign of Emperor Wenzong's father Emperor Muzong. (Emperor Wuzong also referred to a younger brother of Consort Yang as Yang Xuansi (楊玄思), and it would have been somewhat unusual, although not highly so, for Yang Xuansi and Yang Yuling to be brothers but not share a character in their personal names.)

== As imperial consort ==
It is not known when Consort Yang became Emperor Wenzong's concubine, but it is known that as of 837, she was an imperial consort with the rank of Zhaorong (昭容), the sixth highest rank possible for imperial consorts. In 837, she was promoted to the rank of Xianfei (賢妃), the fourth highest rank for imperial consorts, while fellow imperial consort Consort Wang, the mother of Emperor Wenzong's oldest son Li Yong, was promoted from the rank of Zhaoyi (昭儀) (fifth highest rank) to Defei (德妃) (third highest rank). There was no indication as to whether she was involved in Yang Sifu's becoming chancellor in 838.

By 838, it was said that Consort Wang, who was not favored by Emperor Wenzong, had been killed at Consort Yang's instigation after Consort Yang made false accusations against her. It was further said that Li Yong, who was then crown prince, himself favored games and feasting and had become close to scoundrels, leading to Consort Yang's continually making accusations against him. As a result, in 838, Emperor Wenzong put Li Yong under arrest and convened a group of high-level officials, announcing that he was intending to depose Li Yong from his position as Crown Prince. The officials and eunuchs largely opposed the move, and Li Yong was at that time spared, although a large number of his associates were executed. (Li Yong himself died later that year, and some historians, include the modern Chinese historian Bo Yang, believed that he was assassinated at the implicit approval of Emperor Wenzong and Consort Yang.)

After Li Yong's death, Consort Yang repeatedly recommended Emperor Wenzong's younger brother Li Rong the Prince of An as the new crown prince. (As Emperor Wuzong later would allege, he believed that Li Rong flattered Consort Yang in order to receive her favor.) When Emperor Wenzong asked for the chancellors' opinions, however, Li Jue opposed this, so Emperor Wenzong instead created Li Chengmei, the Prince of Chen, the son of his older brother Emperor Jingzong, as Crown Prince.

== Death ==
In spring 840, Emperor Wenzong grew seriously ill, and he had Yang Sifu and Li Jue summoned to the palace, intending to entrust Li Chengmei to them. However, the powerful eunuchs Qiu Shiliang and Yu Hongzhi (魚弘志), who had no input in Li Chengmei's being made crown prince, opposed Li Chengmei. They forged an edict in Emperor Wenzong's name deposing Li Chengmei (on the excuse that Li Chengmei was too young) and naming another younger brother of Emperor Wenzong's, Li Chan the Prince of Ying, crown prince. After Emperor Wenzong died soon thereafter, Qiu persuaded Li Chan, then still carrying the title of Crown Prince, to issue an order that Consort Yang, Li Rong, and Li Chengmei commit suicide.

== Notes and references ==
- Zizhi Tongjian, vols. 245, 246.
