= 780 =

Calendar year

780 in various calendars
- Gregorian calendar: 780; DCCLXXX
- Ab urbe condita: 1533
- Armenian calendar: 229; ԹՎ ՄԻԹ
- Assyrian calendar: 5530
- Balinese saka calendar: 701–702
- Bengali calendar: 186–187
- Berber calendar: 1730
- Buddhist calendar: 1324
- Burmese calendar: 142
- Byzantine calendar: 6288–6289
- Chinese calendar: 己未年 (Earth Goat); 3477 or 3270 — to — 庚申年 (Metal Monkey); 3478 or 3271
- Coptic calendar: 496–497
- Discordian calendar: 1946
- Ethiopian calendar: 772–773
- Hebrew calendar: 4540–4541
- Hindu calendars
- Vikram Samvat: 836–837
- Shaka Samvat: 701–702
- Kali Yuga: 3880–3881
- Holocene calendar: 10780
- Iranian calendar: 158–159
- Islamic calendar: 163–164
- Japanese calendar: Hōki 11 (宝亀１１年)
- Javanese calendar: 675–676
- Julian calendar: 780; DCCLXXX
- Korean calendar: 3113
- Minguo calendar: 1132 before ROC 民前1132年
- Nanakshahi calendar: −688
- Seleucid era: 1091/1092 AG
- Thai solar calendar: 1322–1323
- Tibetan calendar: ས་མོ་ལུག་ལོ་ (female Earth-Sheep); 906 or 525 or −247 — to — ལྕགས་ཕོ་སྤྲེ་ལོ་ (male Iron-Monkey); 907 or 526 or −246

Byzantine Empire with the themata (c. 780)

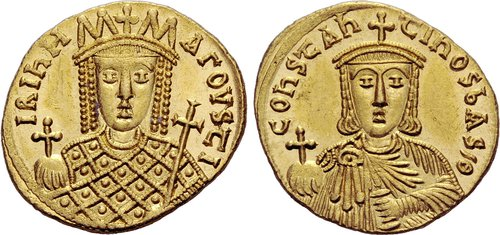
Empress Irene and her son Constantine VI

Year 780 (DCCLXXX) was a leap year starting on Saturday of the Julian calendar, the 780th year of the Common Era (CE) and Anno Domini (AD) designations, the 780th year of the 1st millennium, the 80th year of the 8th century, and the 1st year of the 780s decade. The denomination 780 for this year has been used since the early medieval period, when the Anno Domini calendar era became the prevalent method in Europe for naming years.

== Events ==
=== By place ===
==== Byzantine Empire ====
- September 8 - Emperor Leo IV ("the Khazar") dies after a 5-year reign, in which he has been dominated by his wife Irene of Athens, an iconodule. He is succeeded by his 9-year-old son Constantine VI; due to his minority, Irene and her chief minister Staurakios exercise a regency over him.

==== Europe ====
- Saxon Wars: King Charlemagne decrees the death penalty for any subdued Saxon refusing Christian baptism. Meanwhile Widukind builds up rebel strength in northern Saxony.
- The city of Osnabrück, developed as a marketplace, is founded by Charlemagne (approximate date).

==== Britain ====
- The city of Aldwych rises as an important trading centre in London, under Mercian control. King Offa of Mercia possibly establishes a royal palace at Aldermanbury, on the site of the old Roman Cripplegate fort and amphitheatre (approximate date).

==== Asia ====
- King Hyegong of Silla is killed in a revolt, terminating the kingly line of succession of former ruler Muyeol, the architect of Silla's unification of the Korean Peninsula (see 668).

=== By topic ===
==== Religion ====
- Borobudur, a Buddhist temple complex in Magelang (modern Indonesia), is begun (approximate date).

== Births ==
- Ahmad ibn Hanbal, Muslim scholar and theologian (d. 855)
- Frederick of Utrecht, Frisian bishop (approximate date)
- Guifeng Zongmi, Chinese Buddhist monk (d. 841)
- Hugh of Tours, Frankish nobleman (approximate date)
- Muḥammad ibn Mūsā al-Ḵwārizmī, Persian mathematician (approximate date)
- Rabanus Maurus, archbishop of Mainz (approximate date)
- Yunyan Tansheng, Chinese Buddhist monk (d. 841)

== Deaths ==
- c. June 24 – Kume no Wakame, Japanese noblewoman
- August 19 – Credan, English abbot and saint
- September 8 – Leo IV, Byzantine emperor (b. 750)
- Dunchadh ua Daimhine, king of Uí Maine (Ireland)
- Hyegong, king of Silla (Korea) (b. 758)
- Khun Lo, founder of Luang Prabang (Laos)
- Approximate date – Himiltrude, queen consort of Charlemagne (b. c.742)
