= Li Chengmei =

Imperial prince of the Tang Dynasty

Crown Prince of the Tang dynasty
- In office 839–840
- Monarch: Emperor Wenzong of Tang
- Preceded by: Li Yong
- Succeeded by: Li Chan

Prince of Chen
- In office 837–839

Personal details
- Parent: Emperor Jingzong of Tang

Li Chengmei (李成美) (died February 12, 840), formally the Prince of Chen (陳王), was an imperial prince of the Chinese Tang dynasty, who briefly served as crown prince during the reign of his uncle Emperor Wenzong.

== Background ==
It is not known exactly when Li Chengmei was born, but his elder brother Li Yanyang Prince of Ji was born in 826, and their father Emperor Jingzong was assassinated around new year 827, placing a timeframe for his birth. His mother's identity is lost to history. He was the youngest son of Emperor Jingzong's. In 837, Emperor Jingzong's younger brother, then-reigning Emperor Wenzong, created Li Chengmei and three of his brothers' imperial princes (Li Pu eldest son of Jingzong was deceased at that point), and Li Chengmei received the title of Prince of Chen.

== Death ==
In 839, after Emperor Wenzong, who was sonless at that point — with his own son and crown prince Li Yong having died in 838 — was considering whom to make crown prince. His favorite concubine Consort Yang was urging him to create his younger brother Li Rong the Prince of An crown prince. When Emperor Wenzong requested the opinions of the chancellors, Li Jue opposed. As a result, Emperor Wenzong decided to create Li Chengmei crown prince.

By spring 840, Emperor Wenzong was seriously ill. He had his trusted eunuchs Liu Hongyi (劉弘逸) and Xue Jileng (薛季稜) summon the chancellors Li Jue and Yang Sifu to the palace, intending to entrust Li Chengmei to them. However, the powerful eunuchs Qiu Shiliang and Yu Hongzhi (魚弘志), who controlled the palace by that point, opposed Li Chengmei because they were not consulted before Emperor Wenzong created Li Chengmei crown prince. Despite Li Jue's opposition, they issued an edict in Emperor Wenzong's name demoting Li Chengmei back to Prince of Chen (under the excuse that Li Chengmei was too young) and creating another brother of Emperor Wenzong's, Li Chan the Prince of Ying crown prince. Emperor Wenzong soon died, and after Emperor Wenzong's death, Chou persuaded Li Chan to order Li Chengmei, as well as Consort Yang and Li Rong, to commit suicide. Despite Li Chengmei's relative young age, he had at least 19 sons, and his 19th son, Li Yan (李儼), was later created an imperial prince.

== Was Li Yan a son of Chengmei? ==
During the Qing dynasty, a scholar named Shen Bingzhen (沈炳震) cited some sentences from New Book of Tang that doubted whether Li Yan was the 19th son of Chengmei. In the opinion of New Book, Chengmei was too young to have 19 sons; Li Yan was created Prince of Xuancheng(宣城郡王) only one year after Chengmei was created Prince of Chen. Old Book of Tang referred Li Yan as "the 19th son of Prince of Chen", so Shen thought "Prince of Chen" here referred to the former prince Li Gui(李珪), the 19th son of Emperor Xuanzong of Tang, thus Li Yan was indeed the 19th son of Li Gui. However, in the view of Shen, this was also under doubt, for it was too late for a grandson of Xuanzong to be created a prince.

== Notes and references ==
- Old Book of Tang, vol. 175.
- New Book of Tang, vol. 82.
- Zizhi Tongjian, vols. 245, 246.
