= 842 =

Calendar year

842 in various calendars
- Gregorian calendar: 842; DCCCXLII
- Ab urbe condita: 1595
- Armenian calendar: 291; ԹՎ ՄՂԱ
- Assyrian calendar: 5592
- Balinese saka calendar: 763–764
- Bengali calendar: 248–249
- Berber calendar: 1792
- Buddhist calendar: 1386
- Burmese calendar: 204
- Byzantine calendar: 6350–6351
- Chinese calendar: 辛酉年 (Metal Rooster); 3539 or 3332 — to — 壬戌年 (Water Dog); 3540 or 3333
- Coptic calendar: 558–559
- Discordian calendar: 2008
- Ethiopian calendar: 834–835
- Hebrew calendar: 4602–4603
- Hindu calendars
- Vikram Samvat: 898–899
- Shaka Samvat: 763–764
- Kali Yuga: 3942–3943
- Holocene calendar: 10842
- Iranian calendar: 220–221
- Islamic calendar: 227–228
- Japanese calendar: Jōwa 9 (承和９年)
- Javanese calendar: 739–740
- Julian calendar: 842; DCCCXLII
- Korean calendar: 3175
- Minguo calendar: 1070 before ROC 民前1070年
- Nanakshahi calendar: −626
- Seleucid era: 1153/1154 AG
- Thai solar calendar: 1384–1385
- Tibetan calendar: ལྕགས་མོ་བྱ་ལོ་ (female Iron-Bird); 968 or 587 or −185 — to — ཆུ་ཕོ་ཁྱི་ལོ་ (male Water-Dog); 969 or 588 or −184

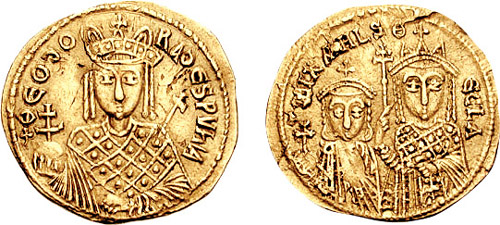
Empress Theodora with her son Michael III

Year 842 (DCCCXLII) was a common year starting on Sunday of the Julian calendar, the 842nd year of the Common Era (CE) and Anno Domini (AD) designations, the 842nd year of the 1st millennium, the 42nd year of the 9th century, and the 3rd year of the 840s decade.

== Events ==
=== By place ===
==== Byzantine Empire ====
- January 20 – Emperor Theophilos dies of dysentery at Constantinople, after a 12-year reign in which he expended much effort defending the eastern frontier against the invading Muslim Arabs. Theophilos is succeeded by his 2-year-old son Michael III, with his mother Theodora as regent and the 'temporary' sole ruler of the Byzantine Empire.
- February 19 – The Medieval Iconoclastic Controversy ends, as a council in Constantinople formally reinstates the veneration of icons in the churches.

==== Europe ====
- February 13 – Last reported sighting of the comet X/841 Y1 according to the Annals of Fontenelle.
- February 14 – Oaths of Strasbourg: King Louis the German, ruler of East Francia, and his half-brother Charles the Bald, ruler of West Francia, meet with their armies at Strasbourg. They agree to swear allegiance (recorded in vernacular languages) to each other, and to support each other against their brother Lothair I (nominal emperor of all the Frankish kingdoms and the Holy Roman Empire).
- March 20 – King Alfonso II of Asturias (Northern Spain) dies after a 50-year reign, in which he undertook numerous campaigns against the Muslim armies of the Umayyad Emirate of Córdoba, and allied himself with the late Charlemagne. The childless Alfonso chooses Ramiro I, son of former king Bermudo I, as his successor.

==== Britain ====
- Uurad of the Picts dies after a 3-year reign, and is succeeded by his son Bridei VI, who contests his power with rival groups, led by Bruide son of Fokel and Kenneth MacAlpin.
- Vikings attack the Irish monastery at Clonmacnoise from bases in Ireland.

==== Abbasid Caliphate ====
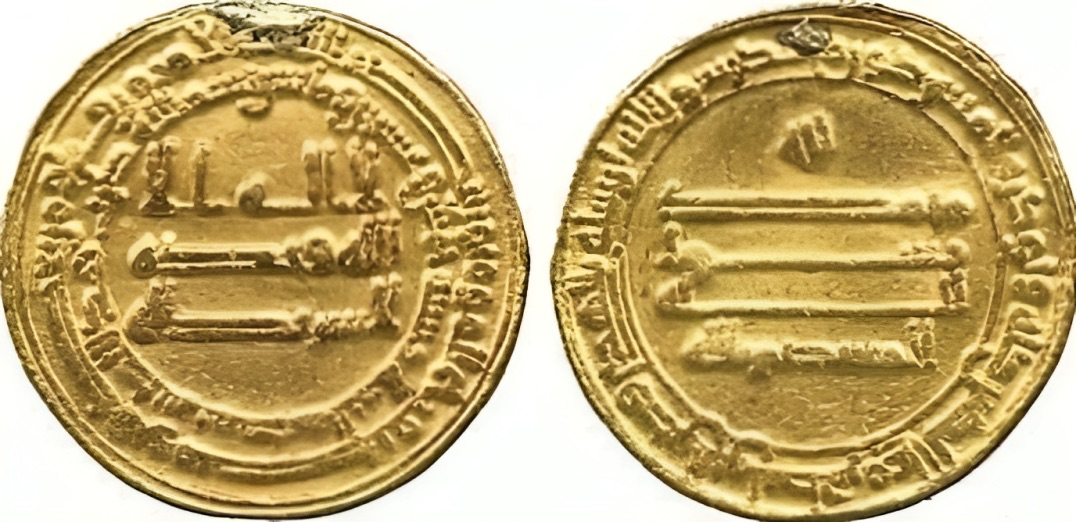
Abbasid dinar of al-Mutasim, he became ill and died on 05–01–842

- January 5 – Caliph Al-Mu'tasim dies at Samarra (modern Iraq), after an eight year reign. He is succeeded by his son Al-Wathiq, as ruler of the Abbasid Caliphate.
- Abbasid caliph Al-Wathiq appointed his brother, Jaʽfar ibn Muhammad al-Mutasim (future al-Mutawakkil) as Leader of Hajj in 842.

== Births ==
- Al-Mundhir, Muslim emir (approximate date)
- Al-Muwaffaq, Muslim prince and regent (d. 891)
- Li Hanzhi, Chinese warlord (d. 899)
- Pietro I Candiano, doge of Venice (approximate date)
- Yang Fuguang, Chinese general (d. 883)

== Deaths ==
- January 5 – Al-Mu'tasim, Muslim caliph (b. 796)
- January 20 – Theophilus, Byzantine emperor (b. 813)
- March 9 – Humbert, bishop of Würzburg
- March 16 – Xiao Mian, chancellor of the Tang Dynasty
- August 16 – Death of Qaratis also known as Umm Harun, was the mother of Abbasid caliph al-Wathiq (r. 842–847). She died during her Hajj pilgrimage journey.
- August 24 – Saga, emperor of Japan (b. 786)
- October 22 – Abo, Japanese prince (b. 792)
- Alfonso II, king of Asturias (b. 759)
- Bernard of Vienne, Frankish bishop (b. 778)
- Dúngal mac Fergaile, king of Osraige (Ireland)
- Li Cheng, chancellor of the Tang Dynasty
- Liu Yuxi, Chinese poet and philosopher (b. 772)
- Sugawara no Kiyotomo, Japanese nobleman (b. 770)
- Uurad, king of the Picts (approximate date)
- We Gyaltore Taknye, Tibetan nobleman
- Zheng Tan, chancellor of the Tang Dynasty
