= Al-Mubarqa =

9th-century rebel leader against the Abbasids

Abū Ḥarb al-Yamānī (Arabic: أبو حرب اليماني) or, according to Ya'qubi, Tamīm al-Lak̲h̲mī (Arabic: تميم اللخمي), better known by his laqab of al-Mubarqaʿ (Arabic: المبرقع, lit. 'the Veiled One'), was the leader of a rebellion against the Abbasid Caliphate in Palestine in 841/42.

== Revolt ==
According to al-Tabari, who preserves the fullest account of the events, the uprising began when a soldier wanted to billet himself in Abu Harb's house during his absence. Abu Harb's wife or sister refused him entry, and the soldier struck her with his whip. When Abu Harb returned and was told what had transpired, he took his sword and killed the soldier. This act made him an outlaw, and Abu Harb fled to the mountains of Jordan. According to al-Tabari, he used a veil (burquʿ) to hide his face so that he would not be recognized, and thus he acquired his sobriquet of "the Veiled One". This sobriquet had a history of being used by leaders of revolts in the Islamic world, from al-Aswad in Muhammad's time to al-Muqanna in the 780s and the leader of the Zanj Rebellion, Ali ibn Muhammad, later in the 9th century.

Al-Mubarqa, as he was now known, began to speak out against the injustices of Abbasid rule, and was quickly joined by many peasants. Soon he claimed to be an heir to the Umayyad dynasty, and was proclaimed as the prophesied "Sufyani", a member from the Sufyanid line of the Umayyad house, who was supposed to arise and deliver Syria, once the heartland of the Umayyad Caliphate, from Abbasid rule. In this guise, the rebellion spread and gained adherents even among the local tribal nobility. According to Ya'qubi, the tribes of 'Amila, Lakhm, Balqayn and Judham participated in the revolt.

According to Michael the Syrian, his troops consisted of 3,000 "starving and destitute men". It may have included a proportion of Christians. In the year of his revolt, Syrian agriculture had been ruined due to a severely cold and dry winter followed by an especially stormy spring during which the harvests were wiped out by locusts. The historian Paul Cobb surmises that these conditions may have contributed to the appeal of Abu Harb's message of popular justice and low taxation among the peasantry.

Abu Harb and his following launched their first raid in Palestine, likely targeting its capital and commercial center, Ramla. They made their way to Jerusalem, looting its mosques and churches and prompting the flight of Muslims, Christians and Jews alike. The Christian Patriarch paid the rebels a large sum of gold to spare the churches from destruction. Their attack on Nablus caused the flight of its inhabitants, including its Samaritan high priest, who was wounded and died on his escape toward Hebron.

Likely soon after the raids in Palestine, Caliph al-Mu'tasim dispatched an army under Raja ibn Ayyub al-Hidari against the rebels. Al-Hidari's forces were considerably outnumbered, and the Abbasid general wisely decided to wait until the harvest season, when perforce the bulk of al-Mubarqa's peasant supporters would disperse to their fields. In the meantime, according to the accounts of Ya'qubi, Ibn al-Athir, and Ibn Khaldun, al-Mu'tasim died, and the new caliph, al-Wathiq, sent al-Hidari against Ibn Bayhas, another rebel around Damascus. Al-Tabari on the other hand places the rebellion and its defeat squarely within the reign of al-Mu'tasim, i.e., before his death on 5 January 842, and records Ibn Bayhas as an adherent of al-Mubarqa. The exact relation between the two uprisings is therefore unclear from the sources. After vanquishing Ibn Bayhas, al-Hidari turned south and confronted al-Mubarqa's forces near Ramla. The battle was a decisive victory for the government army, with al-Mubarqa taken prisoner and brought to the caliphal capital, Samarra, where he was thrown into prison and never heard of again.

== Sources ==
- Bosworth, C. E., ed. (1991). The History of al-Ṭabarī, Volume XXXIII: Storm and Stress Along the Northern Frontiers of the ʿAbbāsid Caliphate: The Caliphate of al-Muʿtasim, A.D. 833–842/A.H. 218–227. SUNY Series in Near Eastern Studies. Albany, New York: State University of New York Press. ISBN 978-0-7914-0493-5.
- Cobb, Paul M. (2001). White Banners: Contention in 'Abbasid Syria, 750-880. Albany: State University of New York Press. ISBN 0-7914-4879-7.
- Eisenstein, H. (1993). "al-Mubarḳaʿ". In Bosworth, C. E.; van Donzel, E.; Heinrichs, W. P. & Pellat, Ch. (eds.). The Encyclopaedia of Islam, Second Edition. Volume VII: Mif–Naz. Leiden: E. J. Brill. p. 279. doi:10.1163/1573-3912_islam_SIM_5292. ISBN 978-90-04-09419-2.
