= 899 =

Calendar year

899 in various calendars
| Gregorian calendar | 899; DCCCXCIX |
| Ab urbe condita | 1652 |
| Armenian calendar | 348; ԹՎ ՅԽԸ |
| Assyrian calendar | 5649 |
| Balinese saka calendar | 820–821 |
| Bengali calendar | 305–306 |
| Berber calendar | 1849 |
| Buddhist calendar | 1443 |
| Burmese calendar | 261 |
| Byzantine calendar | 6407–6408 |
| Chinese calendar | 戊午年 (Earth Horse); 3596 or 3389 — to — 己未年 (Earth Goat); 3597 or 3390 |
| Coptic calendar | 615–616 |
| Discordian calendar | 2065 |
| Ethiopian calendar | 891–892 |
| Hebrew calendar | 4659–4660 |
- Hindu calendars
| Vikram Samvat | 955–956 |
| Shaka Samvat | 820–821 |
| Kali Yuga | 3999–4000 |
| Holocene calendar | 10899 |
| Iranian calendar | 277–278 |
| Islamic calendar | 285–286 |
| Japanese calendar | Shōtai 2 (昌泰２年) |
| Javanese calendar | 797–798 |
| Julian calendar | 899; DCCCXCIX |
| Korean calendar | 3232 |
| Minguo calendar | 1013 before ROC 民前1013年 |
| Nanakshahi calendar | −569 |
| Seleucid era | 1210/1211 AG |
| Thai solar calendar | 1441–1442 |
| Tibetan calendar | ས་ཕོ་རྟ་ལོ་ (male Earth-Horse); 1025 or 644 or −128 — to — ས་མོ་ལུག་ལོ་ (female Earth-Sheep); 1026 or 645 or −127 |

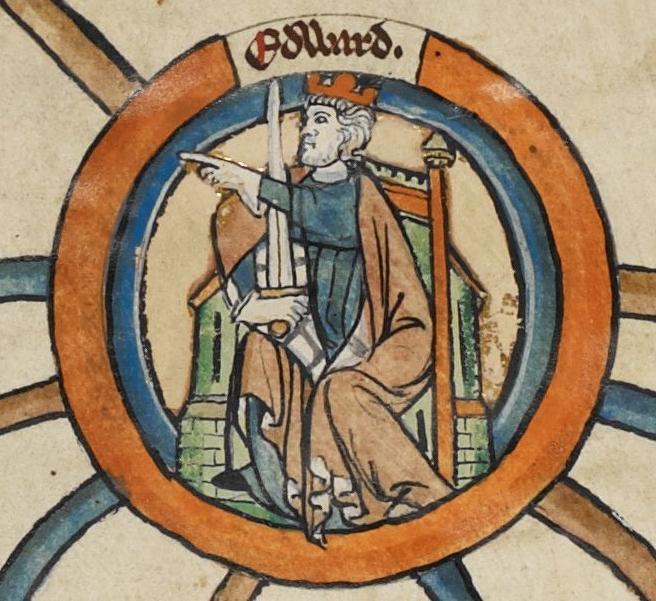
King Edward the Elder (c. 874–924)

Year 899 (DCCCXCIX) was a common year starting on Monday of the Julian calendar.

== Events ==
=== By place ===
==== Europe ====
- Summer – Arnulf of Carinthia, the King of East Francia, enlists the support of the Magyars, to raid northern Italy. They overrun the Lombard plain all the way to Pavia. King Berengar I assembles a large army against the Magyars, and confronts them near the Adda River. Daunted at the strong force, Árpád (head of the confederation of the Hungarian tribes) offers to make peace and restore much of what they've taken, if they are permitted to leave Italy unmolested. Berengar refuses, and the Magyars withdraw to the Brenta River. Árpád renews his offer, offering to leave all his booty and even some hostages. Again Berengar refuses, and awaits their crossing of the Brenta River for a final battle.
- September 24 – Battle of the Brenta: The Magyar forces, consisting of 5,000 men, take a circuitous route through the mountains, crossing the Brenta River and proceed south to fall upon the encamped Lombard army (15,000 men) at Cartigliano. The Magyars massacre much of Berengar's unprepared army. He himself manages to escape to Pavia, changing his dress with the clothing of one of his soldiers. Árpád renews the offensive and heads across Lombardy, pillaging the countryside around Treviso, Vicenza, Bergamo and other towns all the way to Vercelli. He turns south and heads down the Aemilian Road, sacking Reggio Emilia, Modena and Bologna.
- December 8 – Arnulf of Carinthia dies from paralysis following a stroke and is entombed in St. Emmeram's Abbey at Regensburg (Bavaria). He is succeeded by his 6-year-old son Louis III (the Child) as ruler of the East Frankish Kingdom. Arnulf's counselor Hatto I, archbishop of Mainz, becomes regent and guardian of the young king. Louis (possibly at the instigation of Hatto) claims Lotharingia from his half-brother Zwentibold and with the support of the East Frankish nobles he provokes a civil war. The Lombard throne is left temporarily vacant.
- Winter – The Magyars turn back north towards the shores of the Venetian Lagoon. They pillage Chioggia and Pellestrina, and advance towards Malamocco. Their advance into the lagoon is checked by the assembly of the Venetian fleet under doge Pietro Tribuno, which defeats the Magyar's river crossing vessels at Albiola, causing them to pull back. This close call with the Magyars prompts the Venetians to initiate the fortification of the Rialto and the building of protective chains over the Grand Canal.

==== Britain ====
- October 26 – King Alfred the Great dies after a 28-year reign in which he has forced invading Danish Vikings to withdraw, consolidated England around Wessex, divided parts of Mercia into shires, compiled the best laws of earlier kings, encouraged learning by bringing famous scholars to Wessex and made his own translations of Latin works. He is succeeded by his eldest son, Edward the Elder as king of Wessex.
- Winter – Æthelwold's Revolt: Following the death of Alfred the Great, Æthelwold (youngest son of the late king Æthelred I) disputes the succession of Edward the Elder. He seizes the royal estates at Wimborne, the ancient symbolic burial place of West Saxon kings, and Christchurch. Edward set up his army camp at Badbury Rings. Æthelwold first declares that he will 'live or die' at Wimborne, but then flees to Northumbria.

==== Arabian Empire ====
- Muhammad ibn Ahmad al-Shaybani, Muslim ruler of Diyar Bakr, surrenders at the besieged capital of Amid (modern Turkey) to Caliph Al-Mu'tadid in exchange for clemency. Al-Muktafi, the son of Al-Mu'tadid, is installed as governor of the Jazira (Upper Mesopotamia), ending the semi-independent Shaybanid Dynasty, which has ruled in Diyar Bakr since the 870s.
- The Qarmatians, led by Abu Sa'id al-Jannabi, capture Bahrain's capital of Hajr and Al-Hasa (Eastern Arabia). Abu Sa'id makes it his residence and establishes a religious utopian republic.

=== By topic ===
==== Religion ====
- Regino of Prüm, a Benedictine churchman, is expelled from Prüm and becomes abbot of St. Maximin's Abbey (which is destroyed by the Vikings) in Trier.

== Births ==
- Al-Qahir, Abbasid caliph (d. 950)
- Gonzalo Fernández, count of Castile (d. 915)
- Ma Xifan, king of Chu (d. 947)
- Ma Xisheng, king of Chu (d. 932)
- Wang Zongyan, emperor of Former Shu (d. 926)
- Werner V, Frankish nobleman (approximate date)
- Yelü Bei, prince of the Liao Dynasty (d. 937)

== Deaths ==
- July 26 – Li Hanzhi, Chinese warlord (b. 842)
- October 26 – Alfred the Great, king of Wessex (b. 849)
- December 8 – Arnulf of Carinthia, king of the East Frankish Kingdom
- Ahmad ibn al-Tayyib al-Sarakhsi, Persian traveler and historian
- Stylianos Zaoutzes, Byzantine official and minister
- Sumbat I of Klarjeti, Georgian prince
- Wang Gong, Chinese warlord
- Zheng Qi, chancellor of the Tang Dynasty
- Zoe Zaoutzaina, Byzantine empress consort of Leo VI
