= Gerard, Count of Auvergne =

Frankish noble (died 841)

Gerard was Count of Auvergne from 839 until his death on 25 June 841.

== Marriage and issue ==
Gerard married either Rotrud or Hildegard, daughters of Louis the Pious. (Note: Janet L. Nelson states, Gerard is known to have been son-in-law of Pepin I, King of Aquitaine, though the name of his wife has not been found.) They had the following children:

- Ranulf I of Poitiers, Duke of Aquitaine (815–866), married a daughter of Rorgo, Count of Maine
- Gerhard II, Count of Limousin (−879)
- Unknown daughter

== Sources ==
- McKitterick, Rosamond (1999). The Frankish Kingdoms under the Carolingians, 751-987. Longman.
- Nelson, Janet L. (1992). Charles the Bald. London: Longman. ISBN 0582055849. OCLC 23767726.
