= Consort Wang (Wuzong) =

Consort Wang (personal name unknown), imperial consort rank Cairen (王才人) (died 846), posthumously honored Xianfei (賢妃), was an imperial consort of the Chinese Tang dynasty. She was the favorite concubine of Emperor Wuzong (Li Chan).

== Early life ==
It is not known when the future Consort Wang was born, but it is known that she was 13 when she entered the palace and was given by Emperor Muzong to Li Chan, and as Emperor Muzong reigned from 820 to 824, that placed a timeframe as to her birth. She was from Handan, and was taken into the palace because of her talent in singing and dancing, and she was also said to be alert and intelligent. Li Chan was then the Prince of Ying under his father Emperor Muzong, and Emperor Muzong gave her to Li Chan. Toward the end of the reign of Li Chan's older brother Emperor Wenzong (r. 827–840), when Li Chan tried to maneuver to become Emperor Wenzong's heir, it was said that Consort Wang assisted him in the maneuvers.

== Imperial consort ==
Because of Consort Wang's contributions, after Li Chan was able to succeed Emperor Wenzong in 840 (as Emperor Wuzong), he gave her the imperial consort rank of Cairen, the 16th highest rank for imperial consorts, and favored her greatly. It was said that her body frame was similar to Emperor Wuzong's, and whenever Emperor Wuzong rode in the imperial garden, she would as well, and the onlookers were unable to tell which one was the emperor and which one was the consort.

In 845, Emperor Wuzong wanted to create Consort Wang empress. The lead chancellor Li Deyu, however, opposed on the grounds that Consort Wang was of low birth and did not have a son. Emperor Wuzong therefore did not do so. It was said that late in Emperor Wuzong's reign, he came to believe in alchemists who claimed to be able to achieve immorality for him, and he was taking pills they made, causing him to become progressively unhealthy. Consort Wang noticed this and counseled him against doing so, but he did not listen to her.

When Emperor Wuzong subsequently became seriously ill, he asked Consort Wang what she would do if he died. She responded that she would like to follow him in death. He thus gave her a scarf. After Emperor Wuzong died in spring 846, she hanged herself with the scarf. It was said that while the other consorts had long been jealous of her because of the favor Emperor Wuzong had for her, they all were touched by her righteousness. Emperor Wuzong's uncle and successor Emperor Xuānzong, hearing this, was also saddened, and he posthumously honored her Xianfei, the second highest rank for imperial consorts, and buried her in the perimeter of Emperor Wuzong's tomb.

== Notes and references ==
- New Book of Tang, vol. 77.
- Zizhi Tongjian, vol. 248.
