= Reginbert of Reichenau =

9th-century monk and scholar

Reginbert of Reichenau (died 846) was a Benedictine monk who was a librarian, scholar and author active at the Abbey of Reichenau, in what is now Germany.

Reginbert made significant contributions in building up the important book collection of the monastery. Among his major works is the "Library of Symbols", which was written around A.D. 820.
