= Du Xunhe =

Chinese poet

Du Xunhe (traditional Chinese: 杜荀鶴; simplified Chinese: 杜荀鹤; pinyin: Dù Xúnhè; 846-?), Courtesy name Yanzhi (彥之), Art name Jiuhua Shanren (九華山人) was a Chinese poet of the late Tang dynasty, with one of his poems being included in the anthology Three Hundred Tang Poems. Along with Nie Yizhong, Luo Yin, and Pi Rixiu, he was one of the key figures of the late Tang realist movement of Chinese poetry.

== Poetry ==
Du's poems were known for their realistic description of the outer world as well as social-political criticism. He dedicated his poems to the life of commoners and the suffering ones. Du himself argued that the aim of poetry should be "the deliverance from suffering" (救物).

Du Xunhe's literary style was influenced by Du Fu, Yuan Zhen and Bai Juyi. Many of his poems were revelations and exposures of the life of the people in the lowest social stratum while others criticize social injustice imposed by the imperial court of Tang. This was consistent with his realist and humanist ideals.

Xunhe tends to apply simple languages in his poems. As a result, his poems are more comprehensible. For example, the poem "Passing by Hucheng County again" (再經胡城縣) embodies Du Xunhe's social-political concerns in plain words:

Last year I passed by this county seat,
when all its residents were moaning and grieving.
Now their magistrate is bestowed on a redder robe,
which can only be dyed by the people's blood.

Du Xunhe had one poem collected in Three Hundred Tang Poems, which poem was translated by Witter Bynner as "A Sigh in the Spring Palace".

== Life ==
Du Xunhe was born in Shiqiu county of Chizhou. In his early years, he completed his education on Mount Jiuhua. He took multiple imperial exams in his 20s but failed to pass them. In 890, after 15 years of hermetic life, he eventually passed the exam and obtained the title of Jinshi.

According to Song dynasty scholar Zhang Qixian (張齊賢)'s "Luoyang Jinshen Jiuwenji (洛陽搢紳舊聞記)", Xunhe was valued as a literati by Zhu Wen who was then a Jiedushi of Tang dynasty.

Du Xunhe, with the support of Zhu Wen, was especially hostile to the aristocrats in the imperial court. On the other hand, nobles who were offended by his behaviors also plotted a failed assassination of him. Xunhe then schemed to kill every noble in the court but died before carrying out his plan. The disaster of Baima, however, soon fulfilled his goal of eliminating aristocrats.

He Guangyuan, an official of later Shu during the five dynasties and ten kingdoms period had a different record of Xunhe in his work "Jianjielu" (鑒誡錄), a book of anecdotes collected from previous dynasties. According to He Guangyuan, Xunhe was alive during the reign of Zhu Wen after the fall of Tang dynasty. He's record would make Du Xunhe's date of death debatable inasmuch as He's time was not far from Du and he might be historically credible. The official Old History of the Five Dynasties compiled by Song dynasty government, however, does not support He's note on Du.

Du had several contemporary friends such as Gu Yun, Luo Yin, Fang Gan and Zhang Qiao. Song dynasty intellectual Ji Yougong and Yuan dynasty literari Xin Wenfang claimed that Xunhe was the son of Du Mu and that his mother was a concubine of Mu. Such a claim was also adopted by Qing dynasty editors of Siku Quanshu. However, this claim was not verifiable since extremely few historical records remained to provide a clear clue about Xunhe's parents.

In 2005, one of his poems was cited by prime minister Wen Jiabao of China during a press conference.
