= Li Ao (philosopher) =

Chinese philosopher

- Chinese: 李翱
Transcriptions
Standard Mandarin
- Hanyu Pinyin: Lǐ Áo
- IPA: [lì ǎʊ]
Yue: Cantonese
- Jyutping: Lei^{5} Ngou^{4}
- IPA: [lej˩˧ ŋɔw˩]

Li Ao (Chinese: 李翱; pinyin: Lǐ Áo) (772–841), courtesy name Xizhi (習之), was a Chinese philosopher and prose writer of the Tang dynasty.

== Biography ==
Li was born in present-day Tianshui, Gansu, but some accounts relate that he was from Zhao, Hebei. After achieving the degree of Jinshi in 798, he joined the imperial bureaucracy and served in the history department at Changan.

In 809, he was assigned to the southern provinces and made the trip with his pregnant wife from Luoyang to Guangzhou over nine months. The course they took included the modern provinces of Henan, Anhui, Jiangsu, Zhejiang, Jiangxi and Guangdong. His record of the trip, the Lainan Lu (來南録, "Record of Coming to the South"), contains detailed descriptions of medieval southern China and is considered one of the earliest forms of the diary.

At the time of his death in Xiangyang, Hubei, Li held the position of Governor of East Shannan Circuit (now Hubei and Henan). There is some debate about the year of his death. The Old Book of Tang gives the date of 841. While the Qing dynasty historians, however, have argued that it should be 836.

Late imperial scholars regarded Li as the founder of one of the ten great schools of philosophy in the Tang and Song dynasties. As a philosopher, Li was heavily influenced by Buddhist philosophers like Liang Su and also the great neo-Confucian Han Yu. His extensive writings are preserved in the Liwengong Wenji (李文公文集). This work is presumably a later edition of the ten chapters of the Li Ao Ji (李翺集) as referenced in the New Book of Tang. Some of the few poems he produced can also be found in the Quan Tang Shi (全唐詩).

Li's maternal grandsons Lu Xie and Zheng Tian both served as chancellors under Emperor Xizong of Tang.
