= History of Le Touquet =

The modern history of the Le Touquet started with Alphonse Daloz, a notary from Paris, and his partners buying land on the Cape of Le Touquet. They tried without success to convert the rather unproductive warrens for agricultural use, and after they failed, Daloz bought all the land from his other partners and decided to plant a forest and build a manor on his estate. The notary founded the village of Le Touquet-Paris-Plage in April 1882, at first known as Paris-Plage. The subdivision grew so quickly that it drew the attention of John Robinson Whitley, an English entrepreneur who saw a business opportunity in creating an ultra-luxury 'meeting place' between wealthy Englishmen and Frenchmen with an emphasis on sports and generally "health through pleasure". Mayville, as he called the initial project, never materialised, but Whitley, together with his partner Allen Stoneham, implemented a scaled-down version of Mayville's grandiose plans once they bought out most lands from the Daloz's manor at an auction in 1902.

Despite the scaling-down, Le Touquet before World War II gained a reputation of a posh resort due to, among other things, several luxury hotels and an abundance of sports activities associated with the upper class, particularly those catering to the tastes of British guests. In fact, the town's first golf course was inaugurated by Lord Balfour, Prime Minister of the United Kingdom. Thanks to the continued construction boom, Paris-Plage was split from the original commune of Cucq in 1912. The peak of Le Touquet's prosperity came during the Roaring Twenties, as British elites dominated the life of the resort. The town had the largest casino by revenue in France just before the Great Depression. The crisis stopped the explosive growth of Le Touquet but the town came relatively unscathed because the aristocrats from the other side of the English Channel continued to come to Le Touquet as before. Many buildings built in the 1920s and 1930s were a testament of the city's riches.

Wars interrupted the development of Le Touquet. During World War I, the Allied military commandeered large hotels and converted them to makeshift hospitals to treat the wounded coming from the trenches of the Western Front. Enlisted soldiers, particularly those stationed at the nearby garrison in Étaples, were banned from the town to let officers use its facilities for themselves. The town hosted 6,000 Belgian refugees and the municipal administration of the frontline city of Ypres. Military presence was reintroduced in 1939 as World War II took off. Germans captured Le Touquet during the invasion of France in 1940, where they created a local headquarters for the Wehrmacht, the National Socialist Motor Corps and the Organisation Todt. Due to its position on the coast facing Britain, Germans ordered the construction of the Atlantic Wall, which led to the town being heavily fortified and mined. Le Touquet was liberated in September 1944, but it suffered extensive damage.

The town lost much of its traits associated with the British elites as the British sold their possessions to well-off locals and as the government of France decided to prioritise the development of the warmer French Riviera, by that time another popular destination with the high society. Since the 1970s, the town pursued a new strategy formulated by mayor Léonce Deprez, who wanted to make Le Touquet a "year-round resort", so new developments included an indoor thalassotherapy institute, the enduro race called Enduropale and a flea market of antique items. His efforts were helped by improved rail and car connections to the town. The commune also launched massive acquisitions of sports- and culture-related properties. Le Touquet increasingly became populated by pensioners, which, as of 2014, constitute more than half of its permanent residents.

== Before 1837 ==
The earliest traces of human presence in the vicinity of Le Touquet are estimated to be from 240,000 years ago, based on the age of stone tools left by nomads near what is today Étaples. These human ancestors tended to live near the coast of the English Channel or in the valleys of the Authie and the Canche. Agriculture arrived in the area around 5th millennium BCE. By about 2000 BCE, the Canche was an established route for traders on the British Isles to go deeper into the continent, as confirmed by numerous archaeological findings in the estuary.

A significant Frankish trading post (emporium) known as Quentovic appeared in the early Middle Ages. Early hypotheses suggested a seaside location close to Le Touquet, but successful excavations in the 1970s and 1980s near La Calotterie, around 13 km (8.1 mi) upstream, proved that conjecture unlikely. At the time of Quentovic's existence, the territory where Le Touquet stands today was submerged under the English Channel, but sediments accumulated over centuries and pushed the coast to the west. From 1168, the abbey of Saint-Josse owned the territories near Trépied and up to the sea, which was confirmed by documents from 1203 and 1624. Trépied was a fishing hamlet as well as a ferry station to cross the Canche; today it is part of the neighbouring commune of Cucq. Letters patent issued from the French king offered to plant beachgrass on the dunes to stabilise them.

In 1791, during the French Revolution, the abbey of Saint-Josse and its land were nationalised. The government then tried to sell the land, but Le Touquet's warrens were of little value, so when a local magistrate assessed the land's value in 1827, he found that it was still state property. After the survey, the government offered to sell 1,500 ha (3,700 acres) in instalments of 60 hectares, but had to wait until 1836 for the first offer. That year, a Belgian buyer called Doms agreed to buy a total of 1,600 ha (4,000 acres) of land for 80,000 francs (c. €271700 in 2025), but the sale was annulled because he failed to pay the promised sum. On the second try, the government found two new buyers, Daloz and a Mr. Alyon, who agreed to buy the same land for 150,000 francs (c. €545900 in 2025). The deal was finalised on 25 April 1837.

== Alphonse Daloz's residence ==
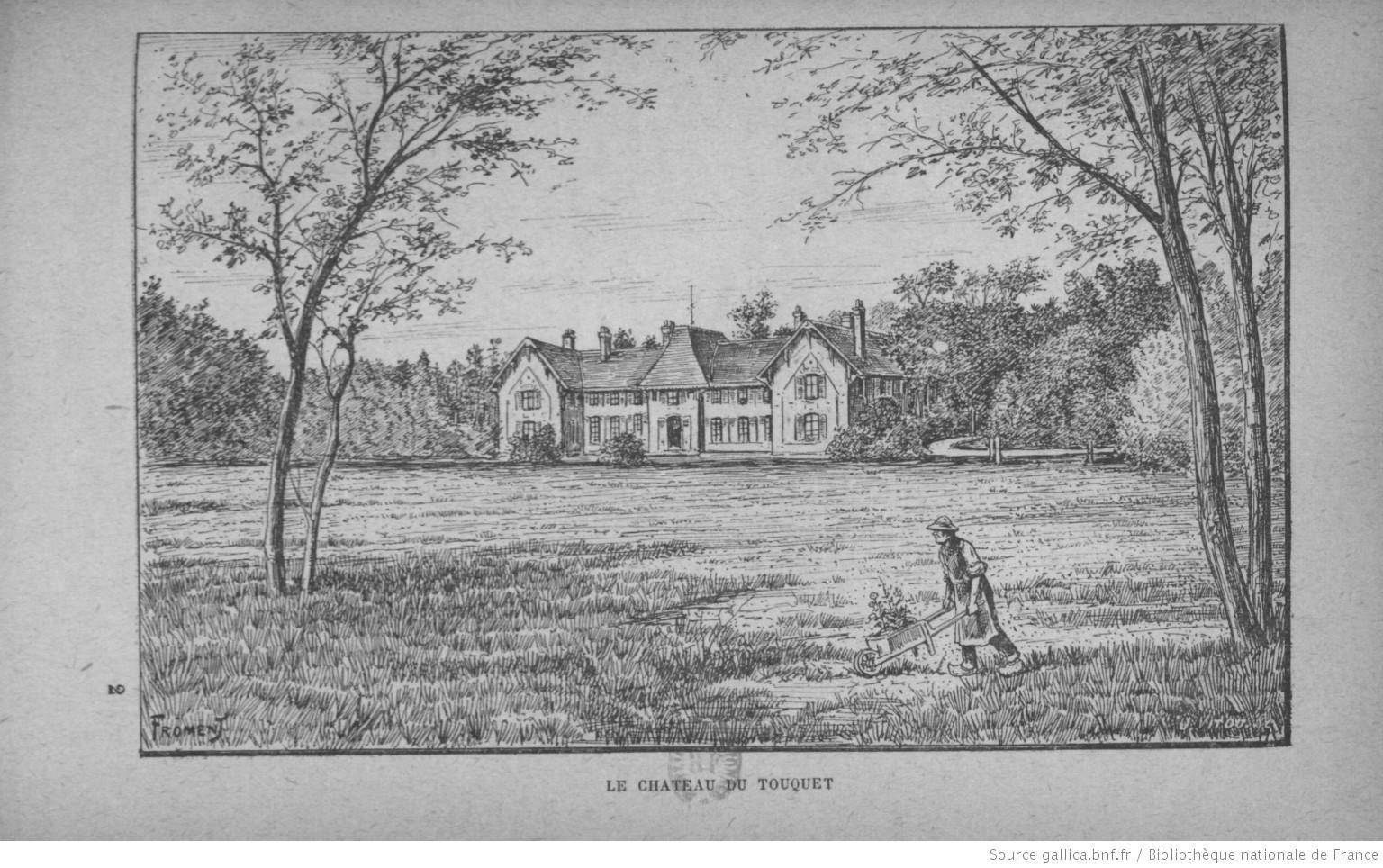
Daloz's palace (1864), near what is today Place de l'Hermitage

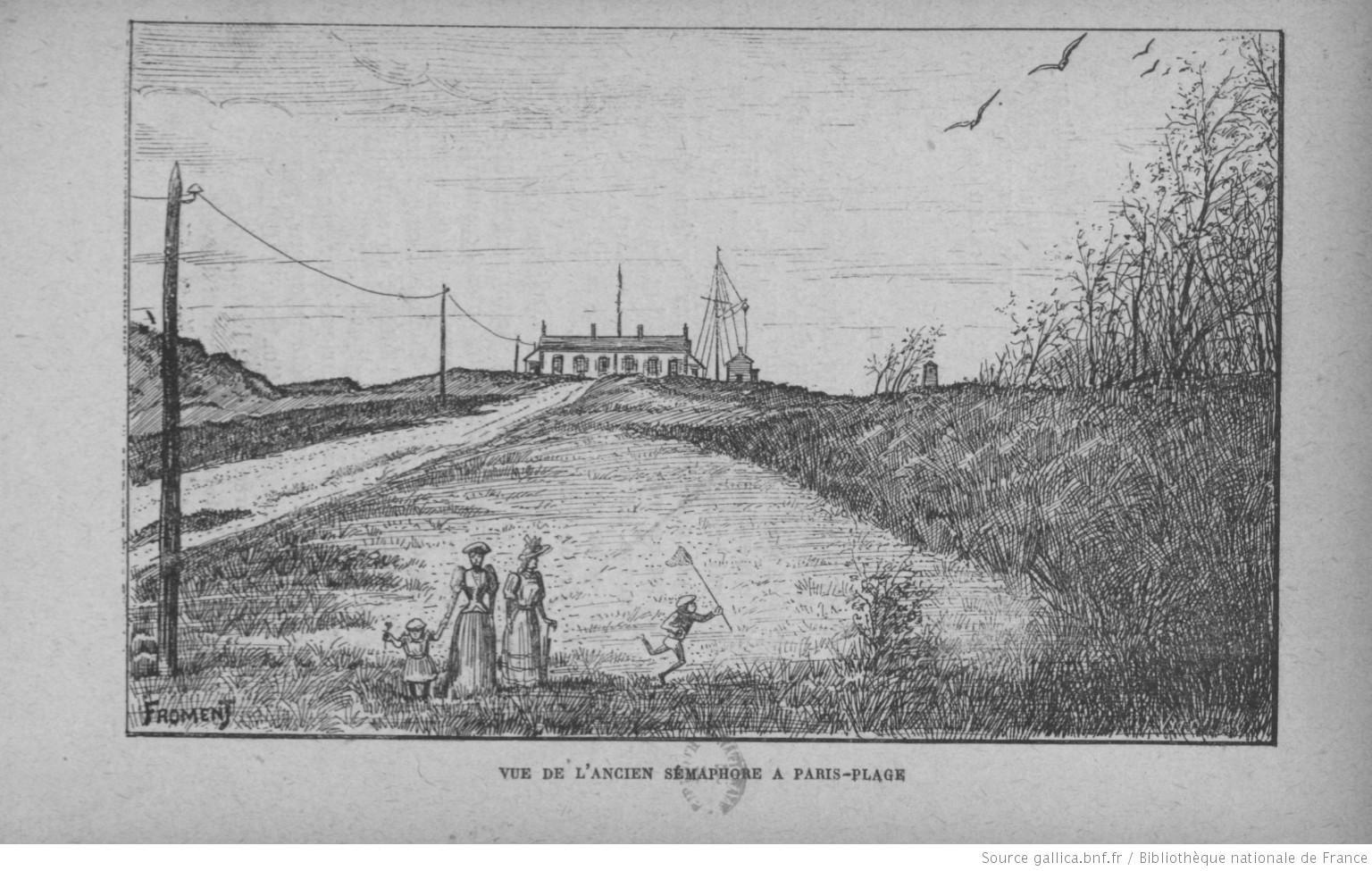
The first semaphore of Touquet (1839)

At the beginning, Daloz and Alyon raised some sheep and cattle, but just after a year, they decided to abandon the venture as it was not breaking even. Alyon sold most of his land to two other people, Mr. Marion and Mr. de Naurois. The four went on to grow rye, Jerusalem artichoke and potatoes and created a new distillery, but they were still losing money. Thus, by 1855 the other three owners sold all their land to Daloz or his brother-in-law, Mr. Rigaud.

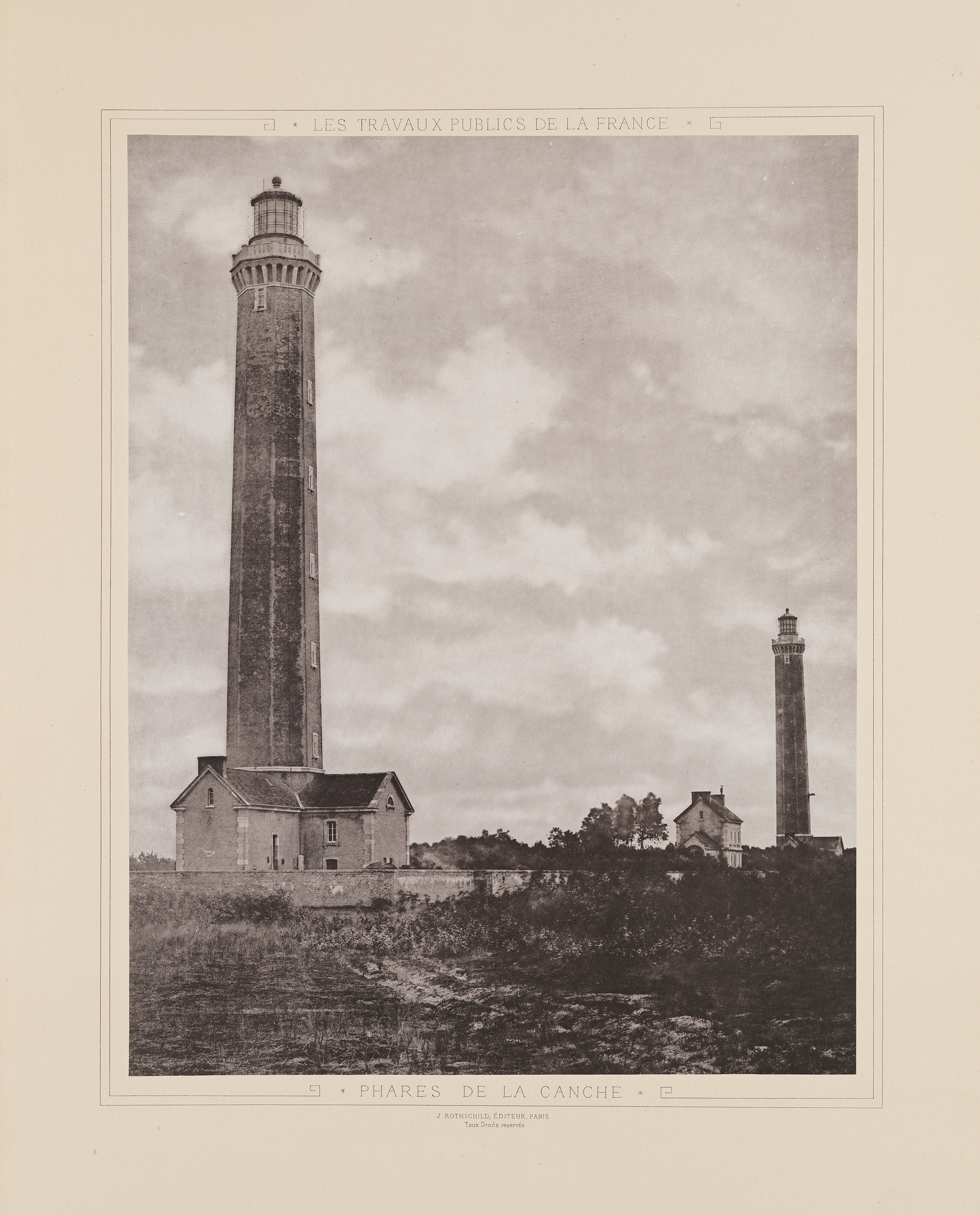
Two lighthouses built in 1852. Neither survived to this day – today's lighthouse was built anew after World War II

Daloz and Rigaud decided that agricultural use was not suitable for their land. They stabilised the dunes with beachgrass and decided to plant a forest instead. In the 1780s, Nicolas Brémontier had done just that in the Gironde for the same purpose, and his forest became the precursor to today's large Landes woods. It is likely that Daloz drew inspiration from that experiment. The harsh winter of 1860–61 destroyed the saplings, so the two owners had to plant the trees again. Daloz was serious about keeping title to the land, thus, in 1864, he built a small palace. He also put a lot of effort in the forest, but as an amateur silviculturist, he made some mistakes, such as not thinning his forest well or often enough or insisting on not touching any of his "beautiful trees", whatever their condition was. That said, Daloz's efforts received significant praise in an 1875 booklet by a local agriculturist. Visiting about the same time, Hippolyte de Villemessant, editor-in-chief of Le Figaro, was also impressed and coined the name "Paris-Plage" for the future development, not least due to its fairly developed infrastructure. In 1847, nearby Étaples was connected with Paris by railway. A semaphore on Cape Le Touquet was built eight years before that, and two lighthouses were inaugurated in 1852 to prevent ships from sinking in the treacherous shoals near Cape Le Touquet.

Villemessant gathered a few of his friends and offered to buy the parcel from Daloz for a very high sum, but Villemessant's illness and subsequent death meant the idea never came to fruition. Daloz then approached a former notary, a Mr. Billiet, to buy 3 ha (7.4 acres) of land for 35,000 francs per hectare (c. €133700) in 2025) for development purposes, but then the owner of the lands backed out at the last minute as he refused to certify the cession at the notary's office. Daloz decided to develop the area himself.

== Beginnings of Paris-Plage ==
In 1880, Daloz contacted Raymond Lens, a local surveyor, who then made the initial design for the first subdivision. Its construction was finished on 22 March 1882 and the first lots were inaugurated on 9 April. Interest in the area appeared very quickly. Already in 1884, an entrepreneur from Boulogne launched a regular horse-drawn omnibus connection from Étaples to Paris-Plage. Also in 1884, the first hotel, Hôtel Saint-Georges, appeared in Le Touquet, but it became a simple villa with the opening of the first of the big hotels of the resort, Le Grand-Hôtel, in 1887. In the meantime, 1886 saw the launch of a dedicated newspaper for the community, Paris-Plage.

In the early years of Paris-Plage, the Daloz family (Alphonse Daloz died in 1885) exercised full police powers over the new settlement as the commune of Cucq was never called to intervene; and when a garde champêtre (rural police officer) had to be called from the mayor's office, they were always accompanied with Daloz's agents. Growth of the new village sparked government's interest in the area. In 1886, the commune held the first hearing about Paris-Plage. Five years later, a dedicated garde champêtre was dispatched to Paris-Plage, thus taking law enforcement away from Daloz's hands. On the infrastructure front, a macadam road to the settlement was unveiled in 1888, and a narrow-gauge tram line from Étaples was built in 1900. Administratively, a local landlords' committee and a road commission were set up in 1889 and 1894 to manage the affairs of the settlement and fill the gaps where state administration did not reach yet.

The village expanded quickly: 30 people lived in Paris-Plage in 1882, 95 in 1892 and 318 ten years later. Most of the original residents came from Amiens, later followed by residents of Pas-de-Calais and neighbouring departments. In 1894, it had 163 buildings; by the end of 1902, there were 355. This included, among others, three hotels, seven restaurants and cafés, two pharmacies, two bakeries producing local bread, three butchers, a liquor store, a hairdresser's salon, a photographic studio, two bookshops, two coal depots, a public bath, a school and a church. By 1897, Le Touquet got its first casino, the Casino de la Plage.

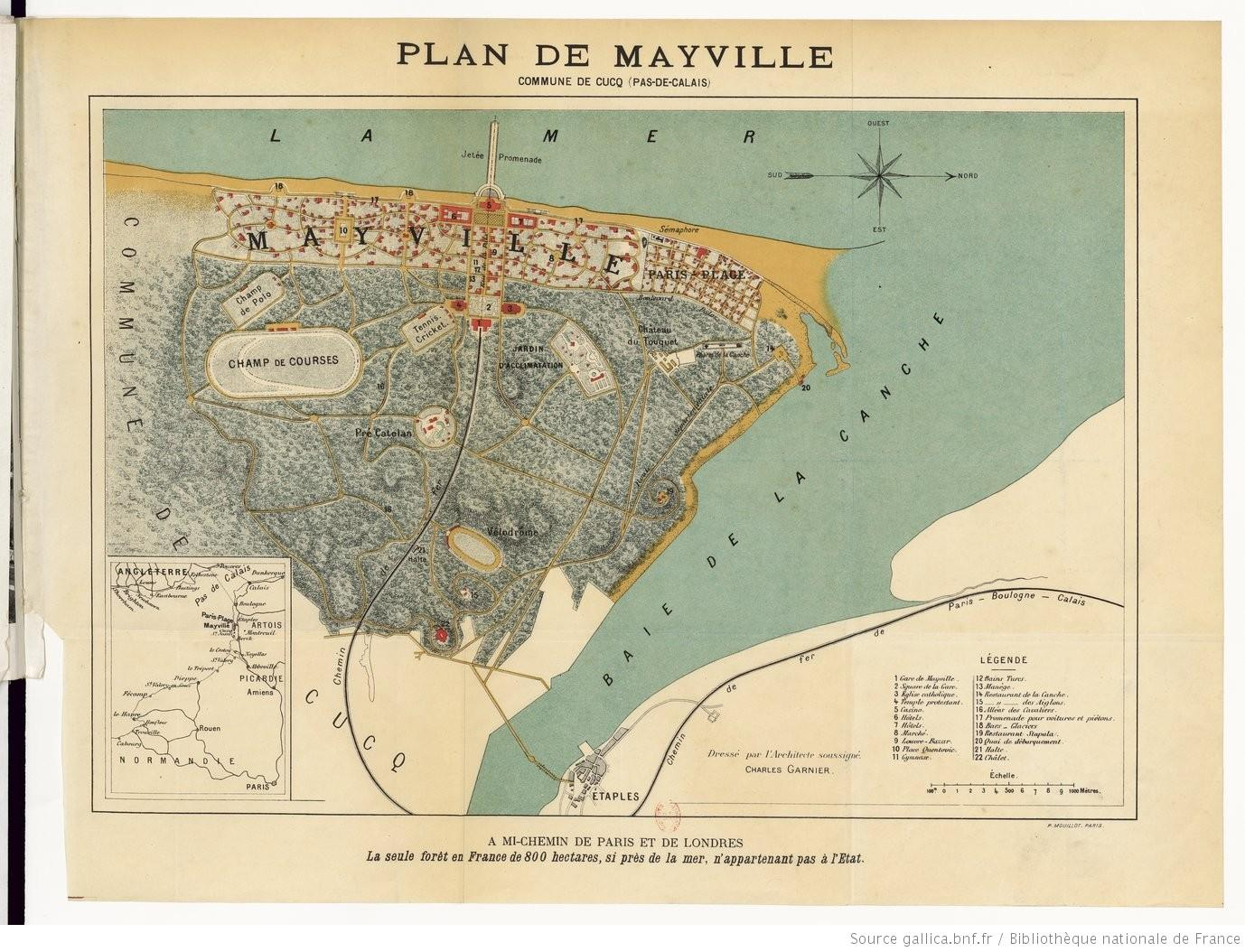
Charles Garnier's plan for Mayville in 1895. It would not come to fruition

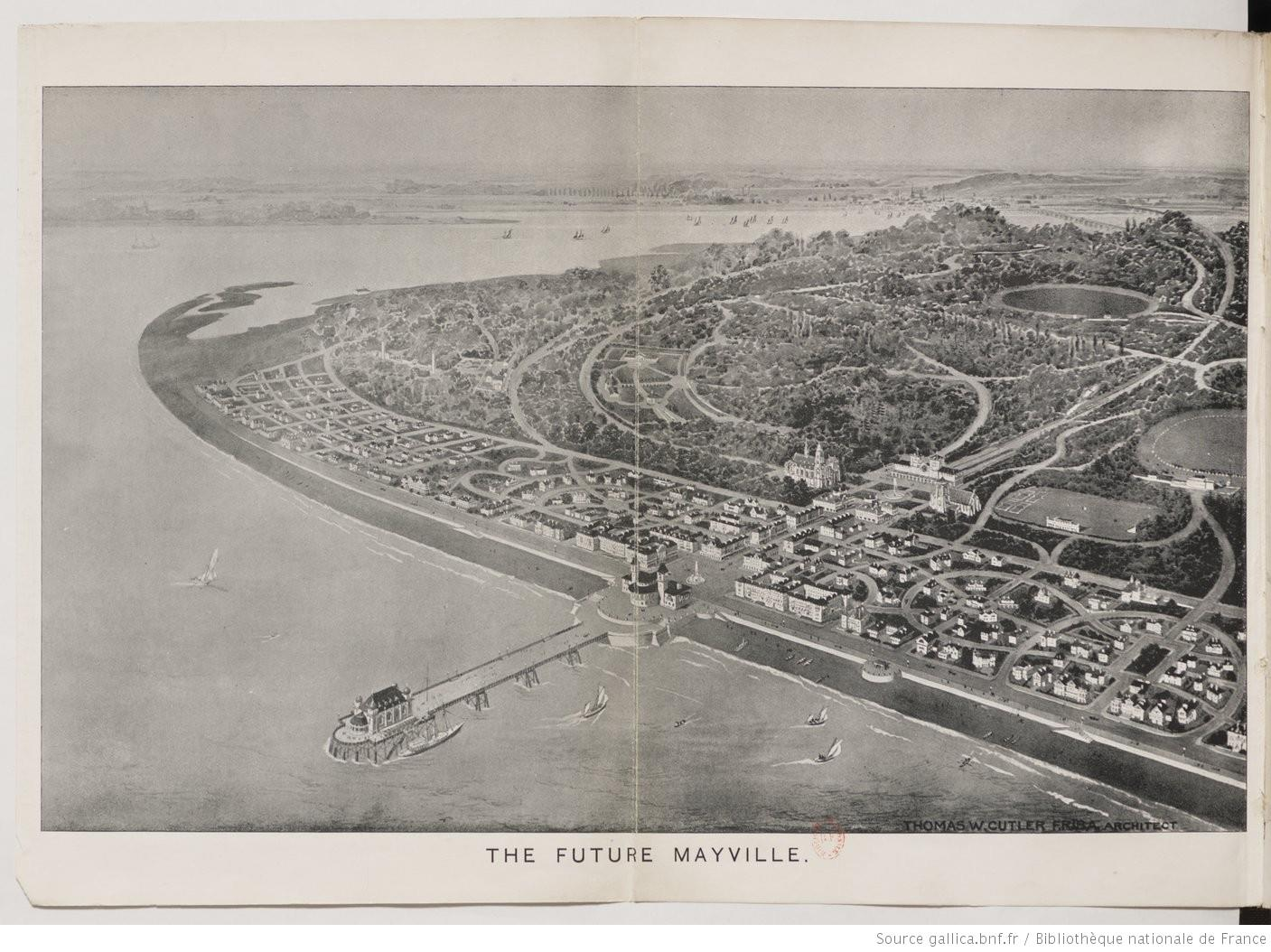
A photo simulation of Mayville based on Garnier's plan, 1895

An English investor, John Robinson Whitley, took note of the growth and saw a business opportunity as a developer. The new resort, which he named Mayville, was planned to be a 'meeting place' between wealthy Englishmen and Frenchmen with an emphasis on sports and generally "health through pleasure". The idea of a luxury resort itself was not new: Dieppe and particularly Deauville (next to Trouville), both in Normandy, were already developing in a rather similar way. Nor was the idea for a resort for the British a novelty, because Boulogne had already been a well-established UK contact point for more than 50 years. However, Whitley's idea was to combine the two concepts in one place.

The Daloz were receptive to Whitley's buyout offer, but the price for the remaining 1,200 ha (3,000 acres) lot was too high for the English investor, so he decided to buy a smaller patch of land (3 km (1.9 mi) long and 500 m (1,600 ft) wide) to the south of the settlement. Charles Garnier, the architect behind the Paris Opera and the Monte Carlo Casino, offered to build luxury hotels and a wide range of sports facilities (see contemporary advertising booklet). Another advantage would be its location halfway between London and Paris, as stressed in advertisements, but Mayville never materialised. The locals opposed the construction as they felt that the new development would marginalise Paris-Plage and would build the railway station too far away. They also were afraid of the fact foreign capital was behind it. Then in 1898, Anglo-French relations soured due to the Fashoda Incident, so the concept of amicable meetings between the countries' aristocrats seemed to have lost relevance. Thus the Compagnie de Mayville Limited, which was to run the resort, declared bankruptcy.

The Daloz announced their intent to sell their manor in August 1900 for 2.6 million francs (c. €12043000 in 2025), which would include the palace with its surroundings and about 1,120 ha (2,800 acres) of as-yet unsold land, but there was no one to buy it. They then lowered the price to 1.3 million francs (c. €6275000 in 2025) and then 900,000 francs (c. €4391000 in 2025), to no avail. But after they offered their estate for 600,000 francs, a bidding war started that Whitley won, offering 870,500 francs (c. €4246600 in 2025) at an auction on 16 December 1902. Whitley was short of funds and the cheque he gave to the notary would have been rejected. But this being Saturday, Whitley had two days to find the money, which he did with the investment of Allen Stoneham. The cheque was honoured and thus Whitley got the land, which he transferred to Syndicate of Touquet Ltd., which had a large influence over further development of the settlement. The company owned Le Touquet's golf course until 1992 and thus almost 40% of Le Touquet's total municipal area, as of 1980.

== The peak years (1902–1940) ==
The two English investors quickly proceeded to implement their plans for a luxury sports resort. In 1903–1906, Pierre de Coubertin, the founding father of the modern Olympic Games, was appointed sports director of Paris-Plage. During his tenure, he inaugurated the community's sports centre (champ des sports) which included a running and cycling track and lawn tennis facilities. In 1904, a horse racing course was opened, and it held its first international competition in 1905. Still in 1904, Prime Minister Arthur Balfour of the United Kingdom inaugurated the first golf course; the first automobile race to Le Touquet—cars were still a relatively new invention in those days—was also held that year with 28 participants. By 1911, Paris-Plage saw the first land sailors roam its beaches, and a year later, a motorboat race was held on the Canche estuary. Cricket, archery and greyhound racing were among some other sports commonly played in the resort.

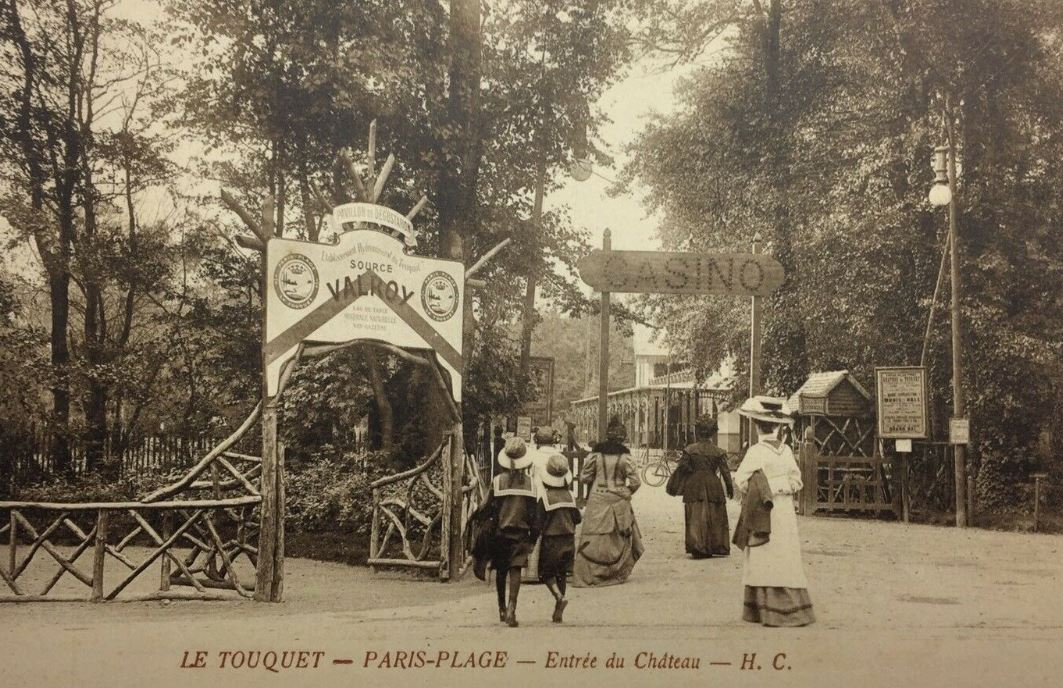
Entrance to the casino and a distributor of Valroy water, as the municipality marketed it

For all the grand plans that Stoneham and Whitley envisaged, their ambitions were somewhat pared down by the involvement of Henry Martinet, a landscape architect. He decreased the size of the resort so that it would bring more profit; the great railway station project was abandoned, as were the plans for oversized villas scattered in the forest. In 1905, Le Touquet launched its own water distribution service from an underground source located about 1.5 km (0.93 mi) north of Étaples, which still supplies water as of 2025, but plans to launch a mineral spa facility had to be postponed because of World War I and were then abandoned. That said, the luxury resort was still developing rapidly. For a few examples, The Atlantic, one of the top hotels of Paris-Plage, opened its doors in 1904, followed by Golf Hotel in 1908. In 1903, the old Daloz villa was converted into a concert hall, and that became Casino de la Forêt ten years later. That place still serves as a gambling facility, today known as Casino Barrière. In the centre of the town, a new narrow-gauge tram line was unveiled in 1909, and an internal line servicing the golf club's customers opened the following year. In recognition of the fast development of the resort, a 1912 law formed the commune of Le Touquet-Paris-Plage from a part of the commune of Cucq.

Luxury facilities in Le Touquet. The first seven hotels were of the highest category, hors-classe

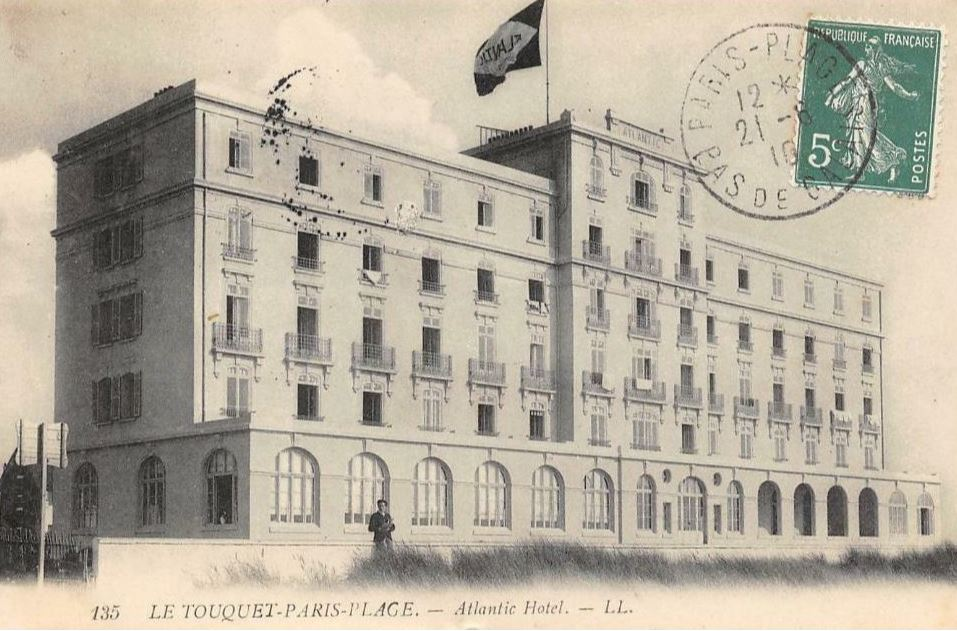
Atlantic Hotel (built in 1904)

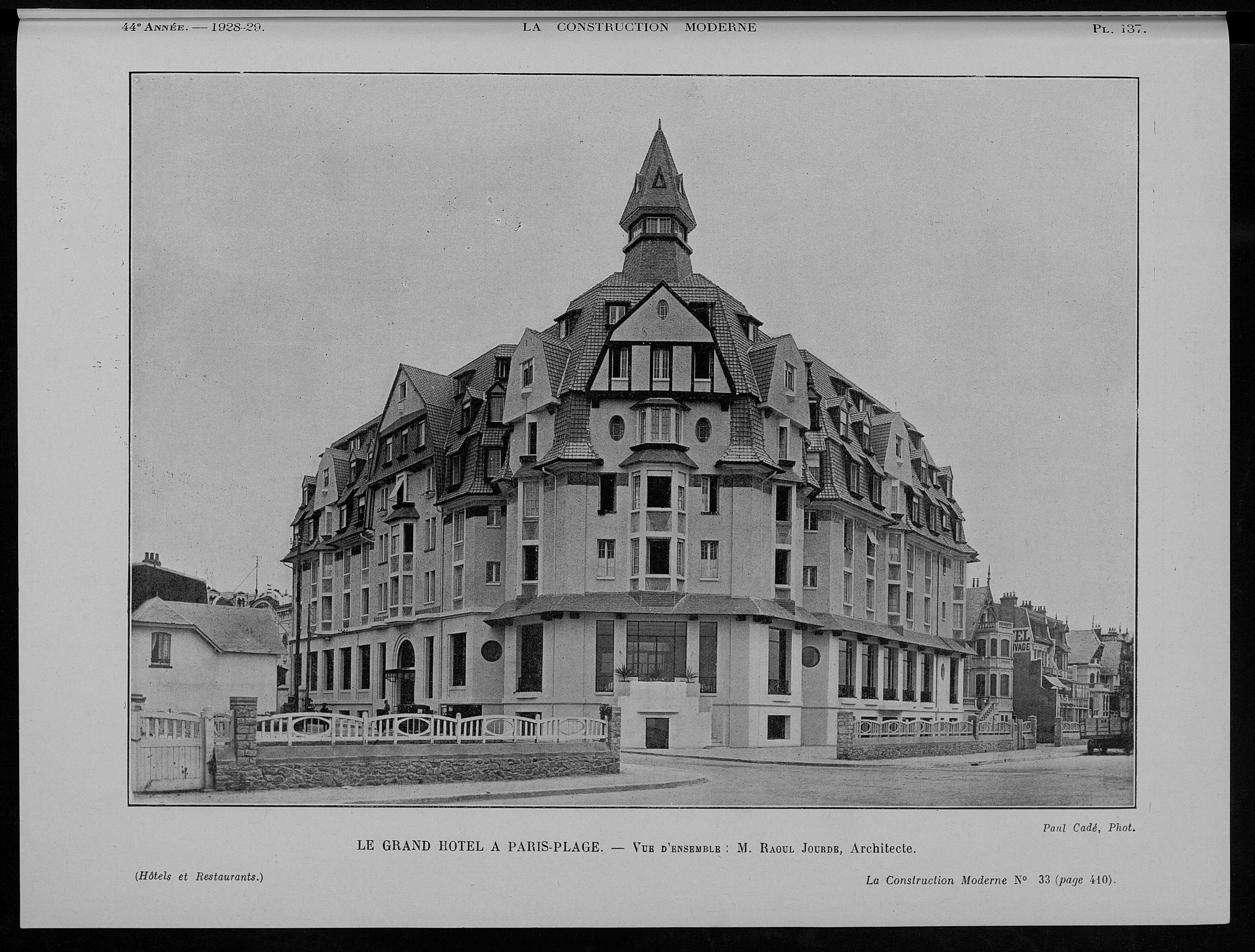
Grand-Hôtel (built in 1887), as portrayed in a magazine article from 1926

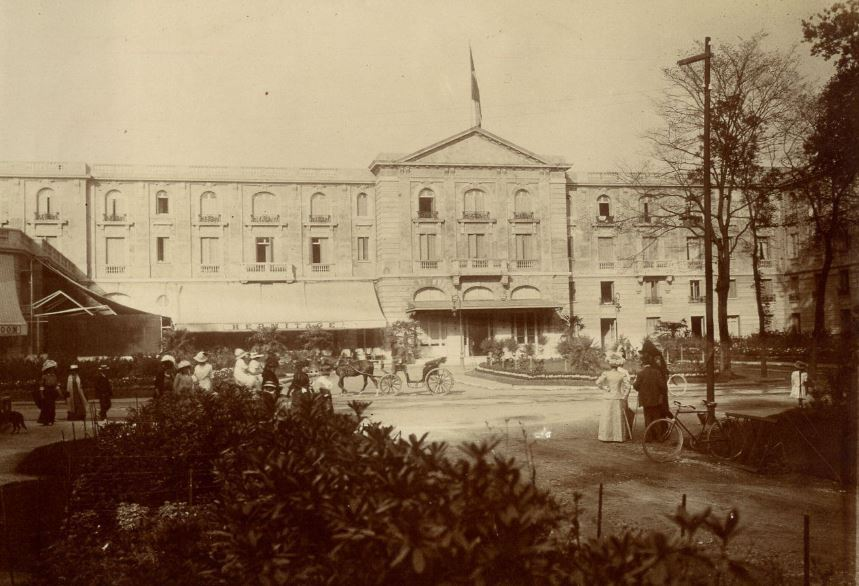
Hotel Hermitage (1904, rebuilt 1909), here in the rebuilt version.

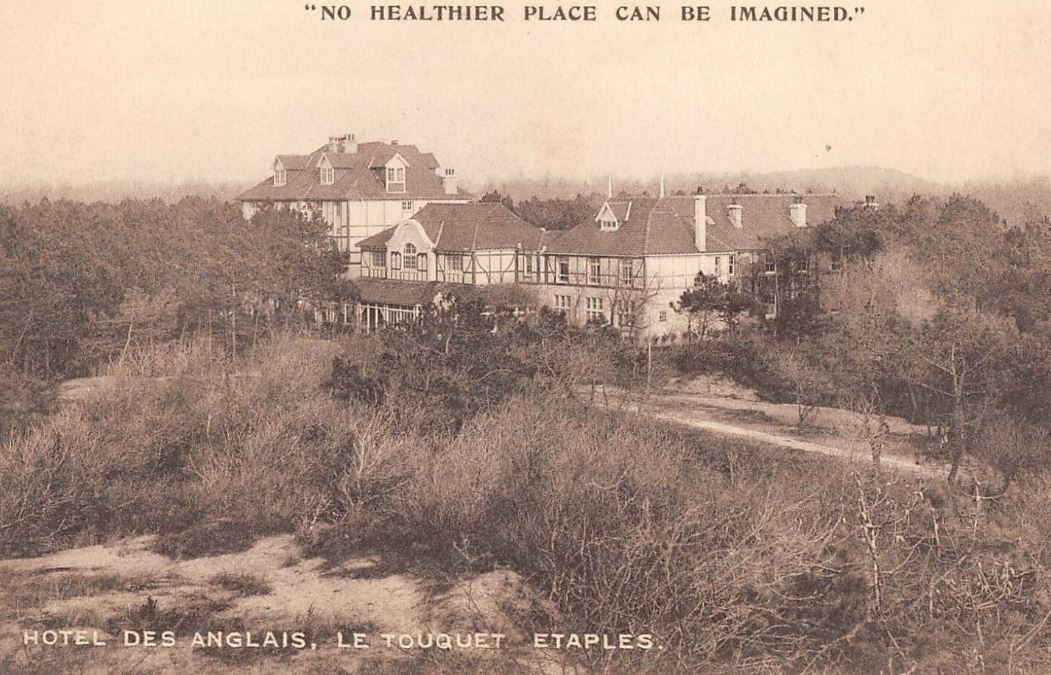
A bird's-eye view of the Hôtel des Anglais (1904) as it appeared in an advertisement

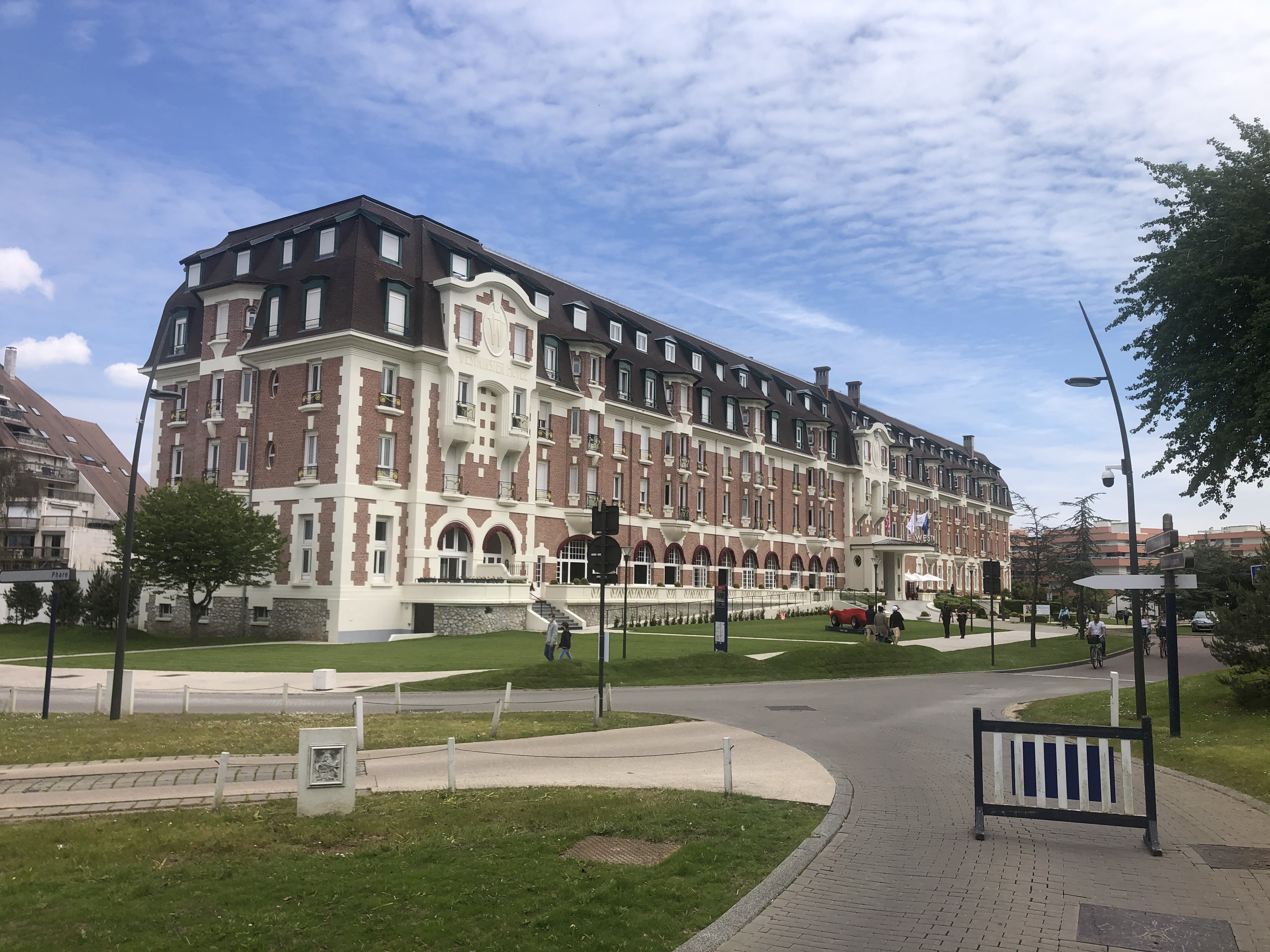
Hotel Westminster (1924, expanded 1926), the only luxury hotel still in existence

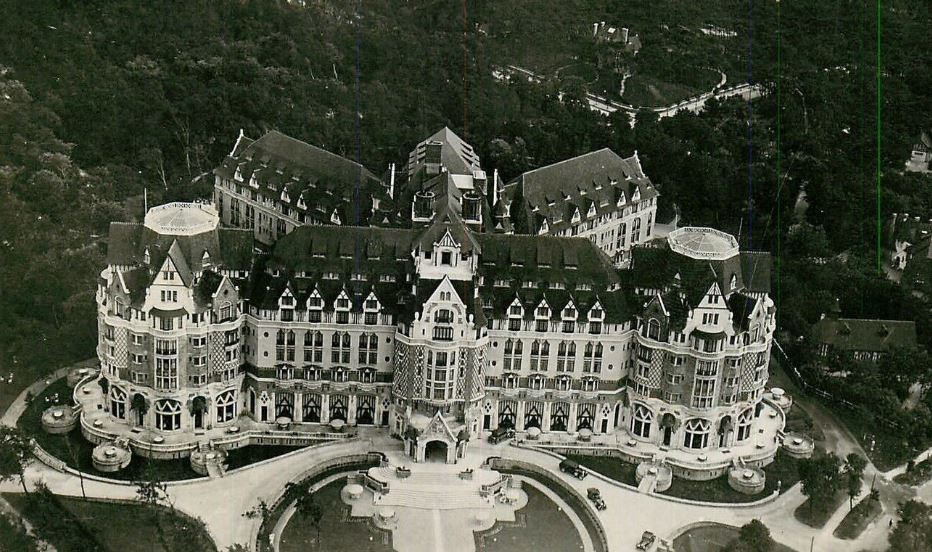
A bird's-eye view on Hotel Royal Picardy (1929), by Louis Debrouwer and Pierre Drobecq

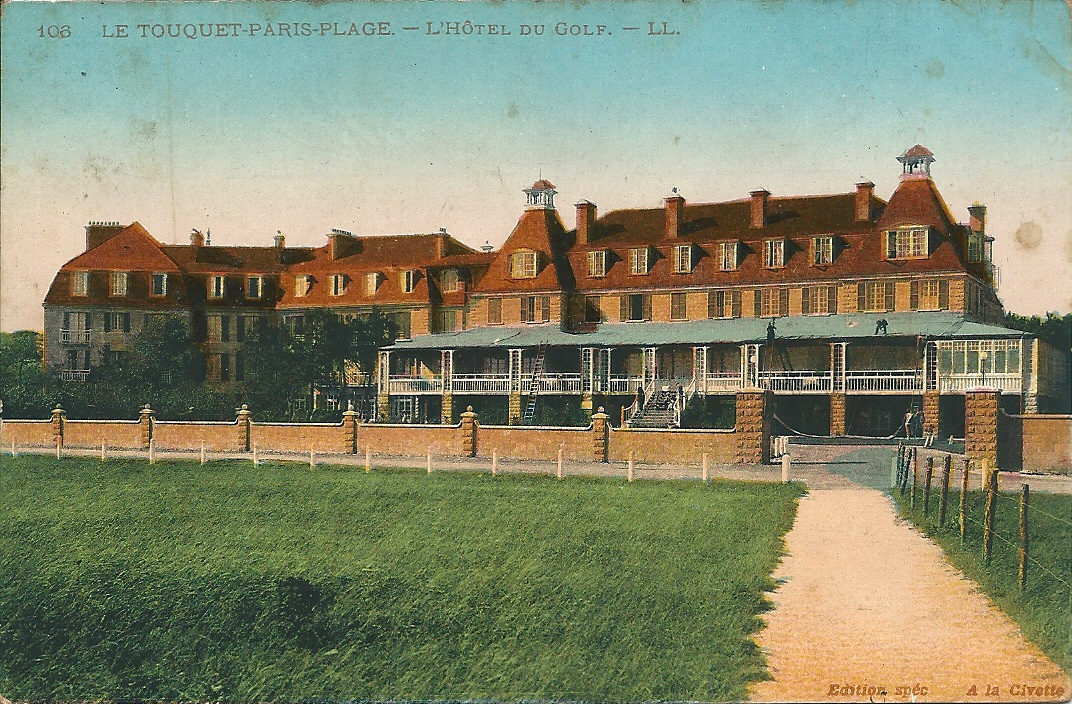
Golf Hotel (1908), as seen in the post-expansion stage on a 1922 postcard

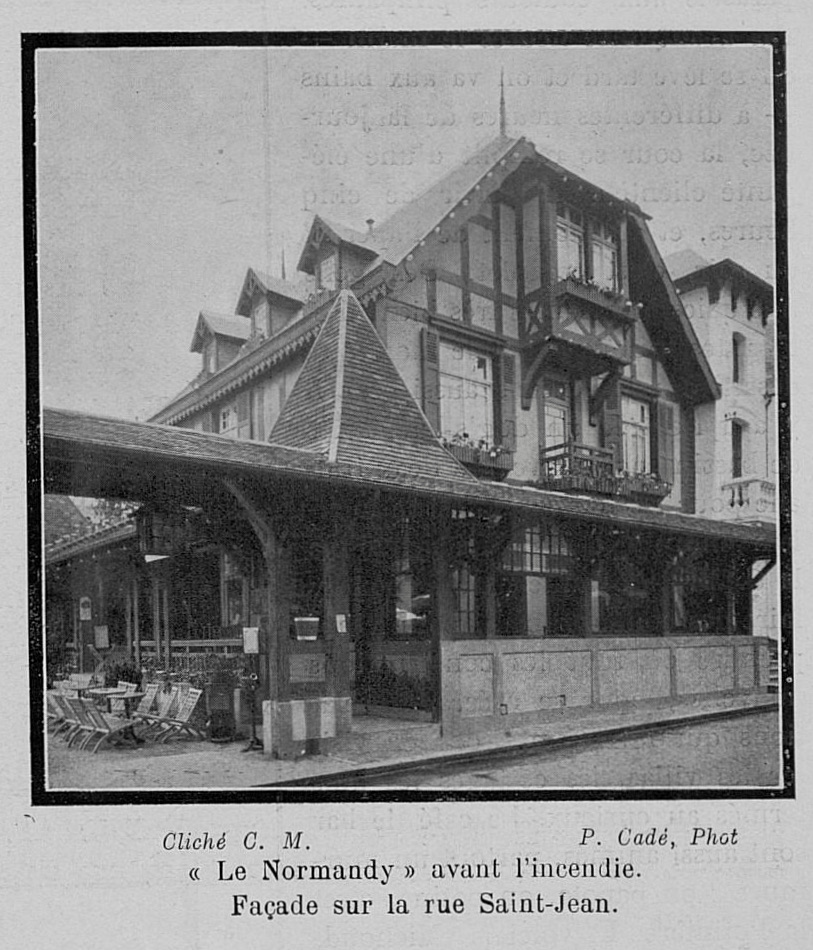
Hotel Normandy (1924), as seen before its partial destruction by a fire in 1928

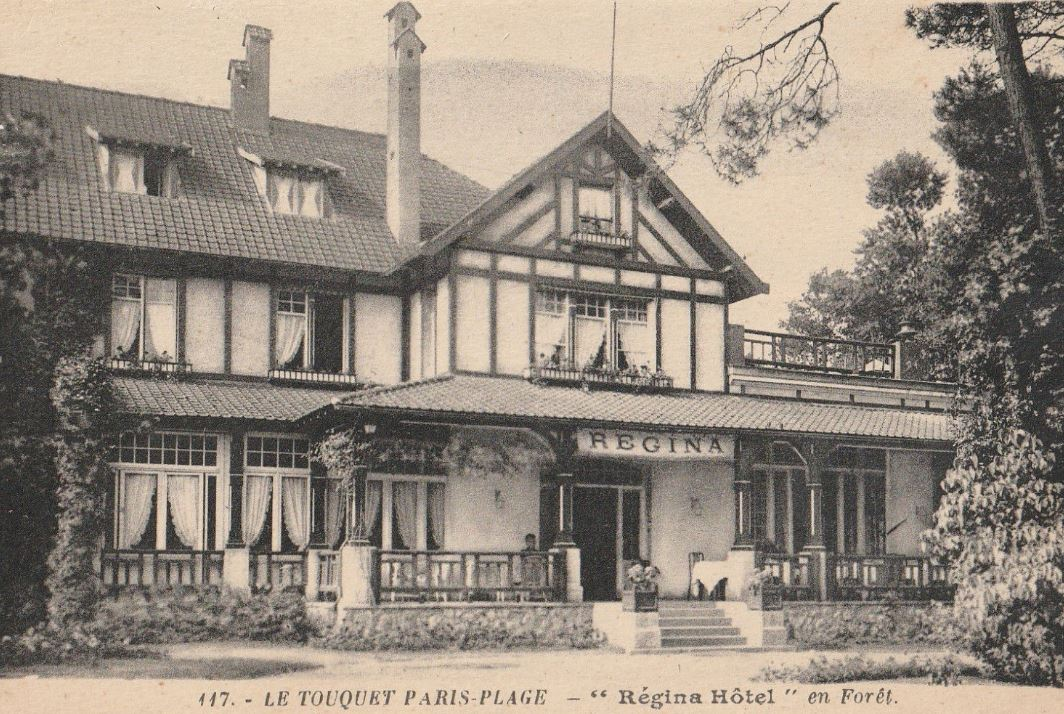
Entrance to Hotel Regina, built in the 1920s

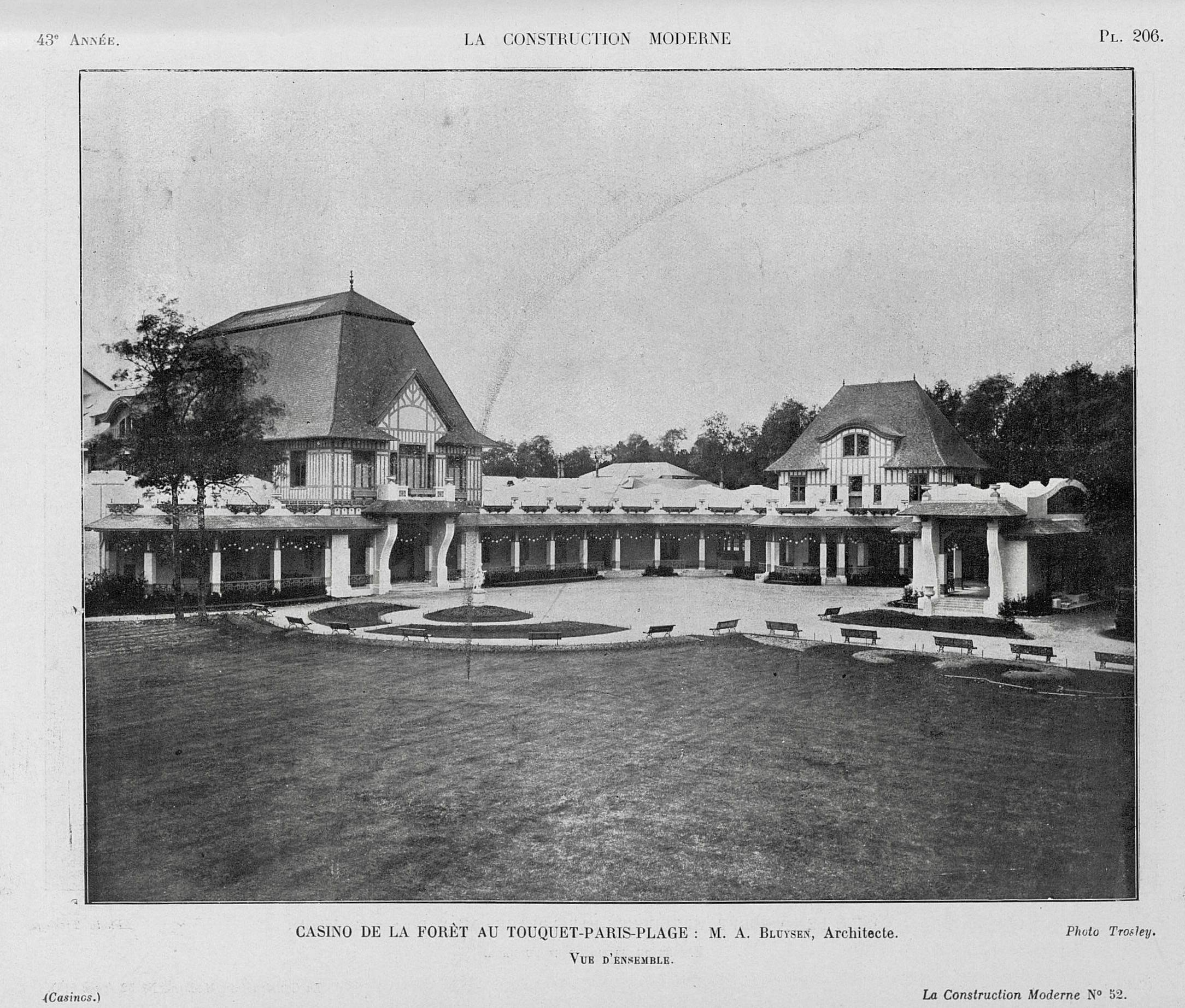
Casino de la Forêt (1913), as seen in a 1928 trade publication

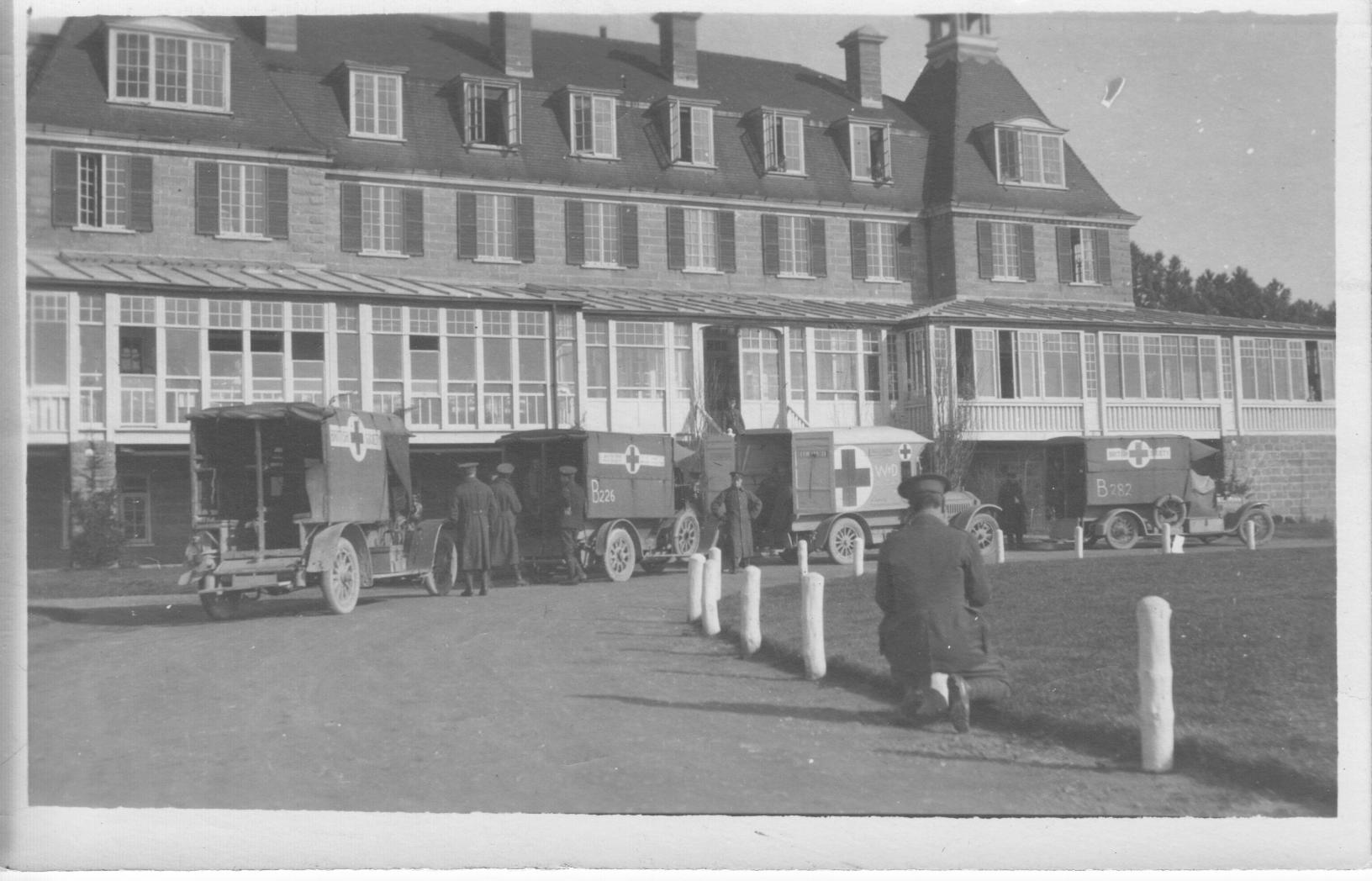
Canadian ambulances queuing up at Golf Hotel in 1915. The first Canadian soldiers who arrived on French soil were those who set up a military hospital in this building.

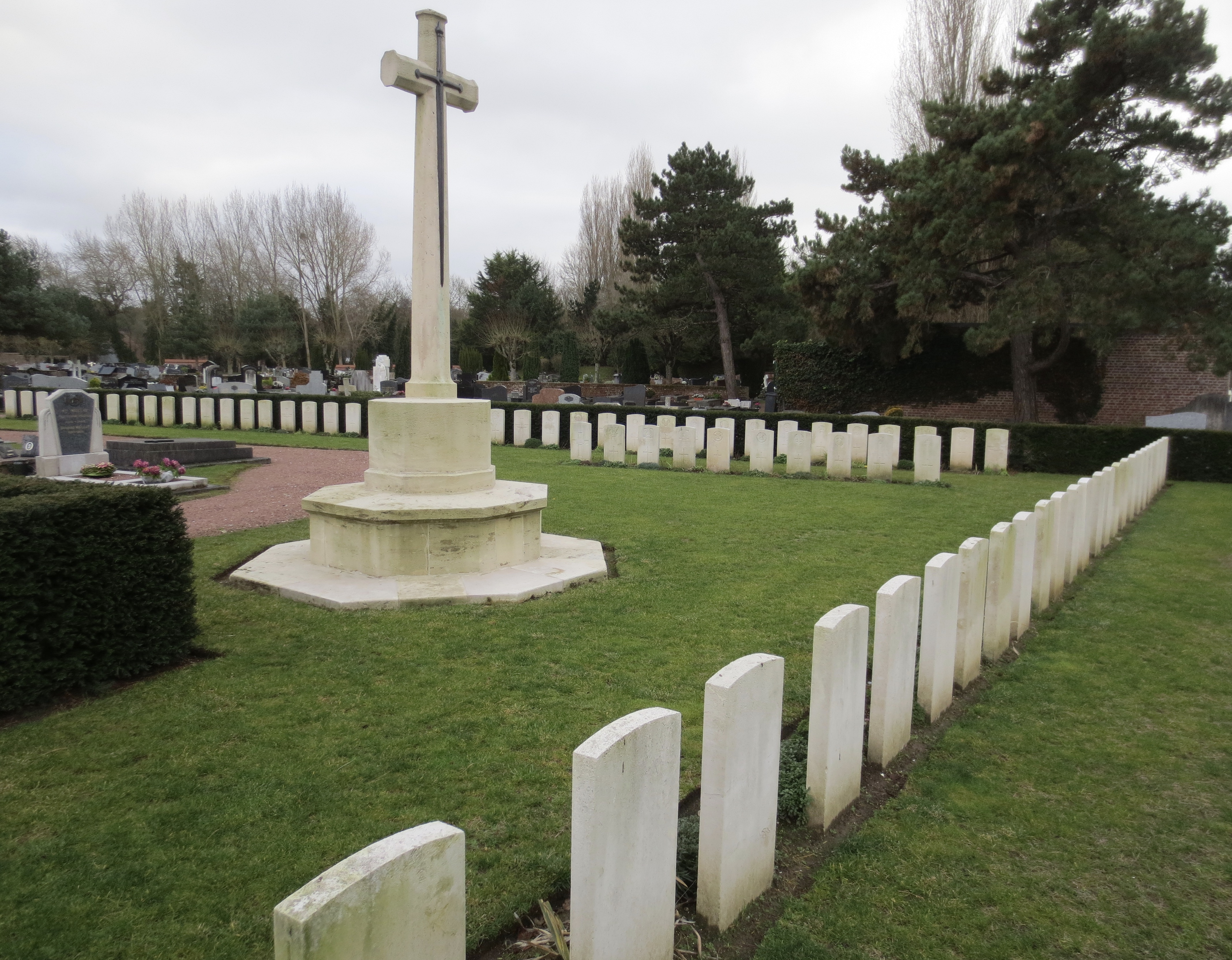
The communal cemetery of Le Touquet has 142 graves of British soldiers in WWI (died November 1914 to April 1916), as well as some French and Italian ones

The breakout of World War I in July 1914 altered the city in significant ways. 6,000 Belgian refugees fleeing the Western Front settled in the commune, the municipal administration of the Belgian town of Ypres moved to Le Touquet, while emptied hotels became Allied forces' military hospitals with a total capacity of 3,400 beds. Some of psychiatrists there were instrumental in early research into post-traumatic stress disorder, as evidenced by the fact that in 1915, Charles Myers coined the term shell shock when he published a case study about three soldiers he was treating in a casino in the beach resort. Nearby Étaples housed an enormous military camp for training and dispatching soldiers directly to the frontlines. Even though enlisted soldiers could go out with the garrison's permission to that town, entry to Le Touquet, a much more tempting attraction, was allowed for officers only so that the low-ranked would not spoil the recreation there. The bridge over the Canche had a British military police ("Red Caps") checkpoint to turn away those of low military rank, but many soldiers smuggled their way to Le Touquet on low tide and clandestinely used its facilities. When in September 1917, a New Zealand enlisted soldier was caught crossing the Canche from Le Touquet and threatened to be harshly punished, more than 1,000 soldiers stationed at Étaples, most from ANZAC, mutinied. In an indirect way, the facilities which British soldiers saw in Le Touquet when recovering from wartime injuries encouraged them to return there once the war was over.

The Roaring Twenties were the time of highest prosperity for the settlement. Vigorous construction efforts continued, which culminated in among the largest hotels in the settlement, Hotel Westminster (1924) and Hotel Royal Picardy (1929). The 500-room Royal Picardy was, as contemporary reviews had it, the "biggest, most luxurious hotel in the world", and boasted a pool of sparkling water. In the meantime, the new horse racecourse was unveiled in 1925. A new post office building that was architecturally similar to a church standing there before opened its doors in 1927. Four years later, the commune built a new swimming pool next to the beach with ample facilities and four trampolines. Even though Le Touquet was a relatively small municipality, it was so rich that it covered all the expenses of building the new grandiose neo-Renaissance city hall (also opened in 1931) from one-year revenue from gambling taxes alone. This was possible thanks to the fact that in 1927 and 1928, Le Touquet had the biggest casino in France by revenue (45 and 58 million francs, or c. €33.38 and €43.03) million in 2025 values, respectively). Up to 90% of clients of the resort were British, most of them upper-class.

The Great Depression dealt a blow to Le Touquet's fortunes. Rapid population growth that defined the booming settlement since the 1902 Whitley and Stoneham deal ground to a halt. Interest into real estate dwindled, new projects and expansions were abandoned, and casino revenues never returned to pre-crisis levels. Despite this slowdown, Le Touquet was still doing relatively well as the tourists in Le Touquet were those who were not particularly affected by the Great Depression and were among contemporary A-list celebrities, such as Noël Coward, the Prince of Wales (future Edward VIII) and Indian maharajas. Ian Fleming, the author of James Bond novels, was a frequent guest in pre-war Le Touquet. Jeremy Black and Oliver Buckton thus suggest that Royale-les-Eaux, a fictional town that in some passages of the novels is shown as near Le Touquet, may have in fact been partly based on it.

A certain revival for the wider region came with the democratisation of leisure as the right to two weeks' paid leave was assured by the Matignon Agreements in 1936, but Le Touquet essentially remained an upper-class British resort. The main investments of the 1930s were the market pavilion in the town centre (1932) and the international airport that, since its opening in 1936, has mostly served British customers.

Le Touquet's architecture before World War II

Aerial view on Le Touquet in 1935. From foreground to background: Le Touquet, the horse racecourse, Étaples

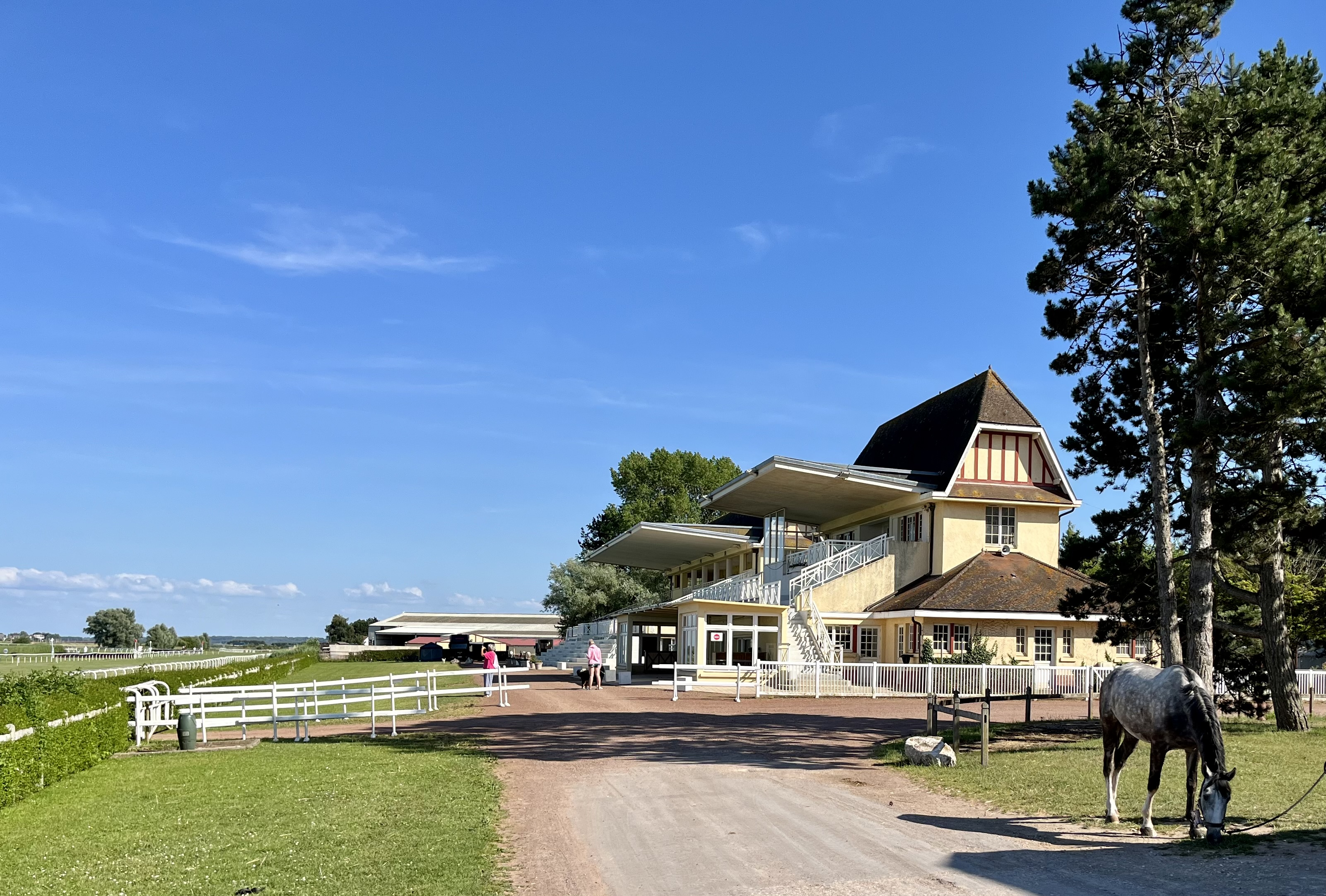
Horse racecourse (1925), view on the spectator stands (centre-right) and the course (left)

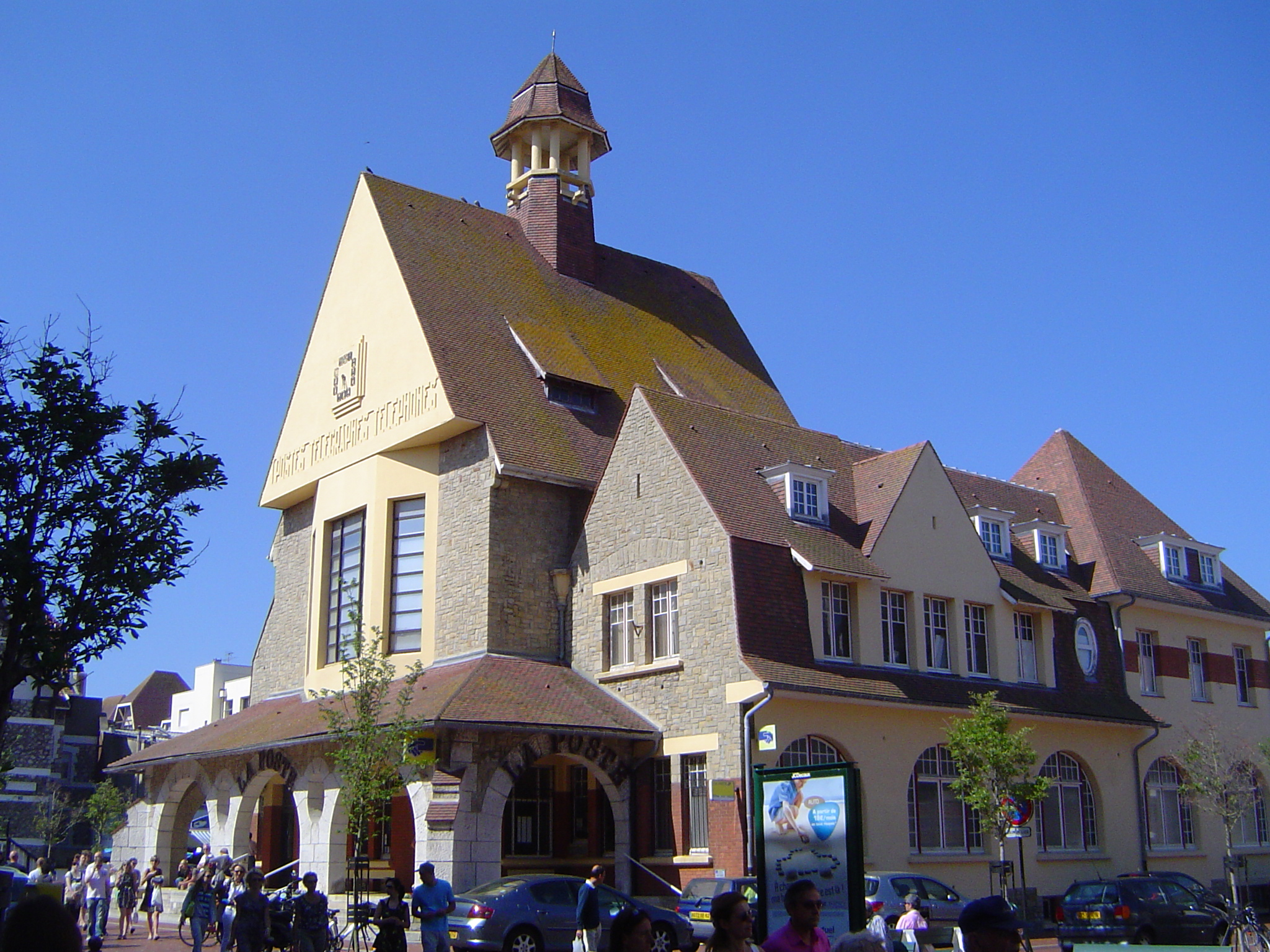
Post office (1927)

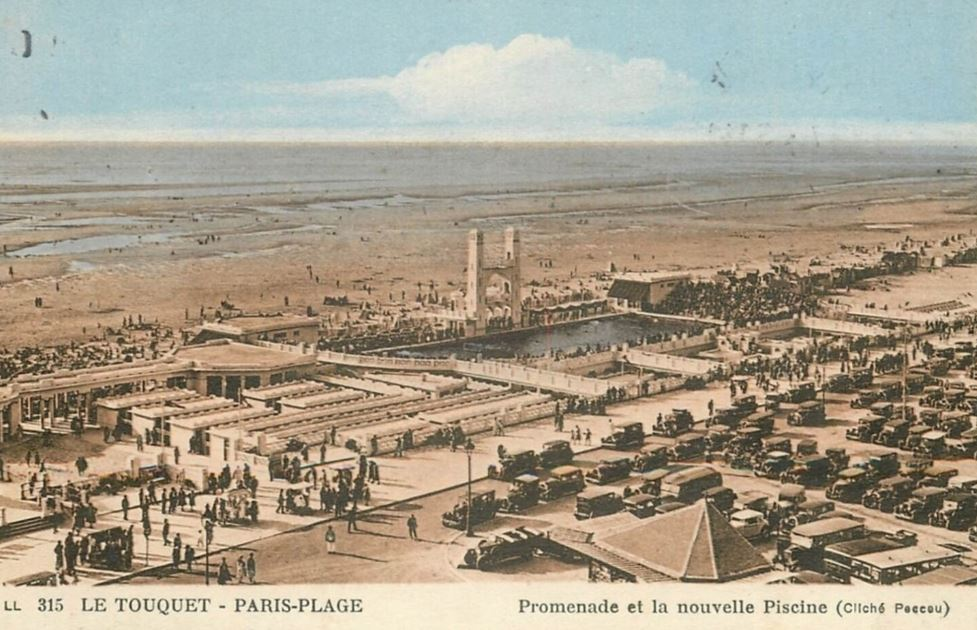
View on the swimming pool (1931) with the diving tower (centre). Today it is a water park

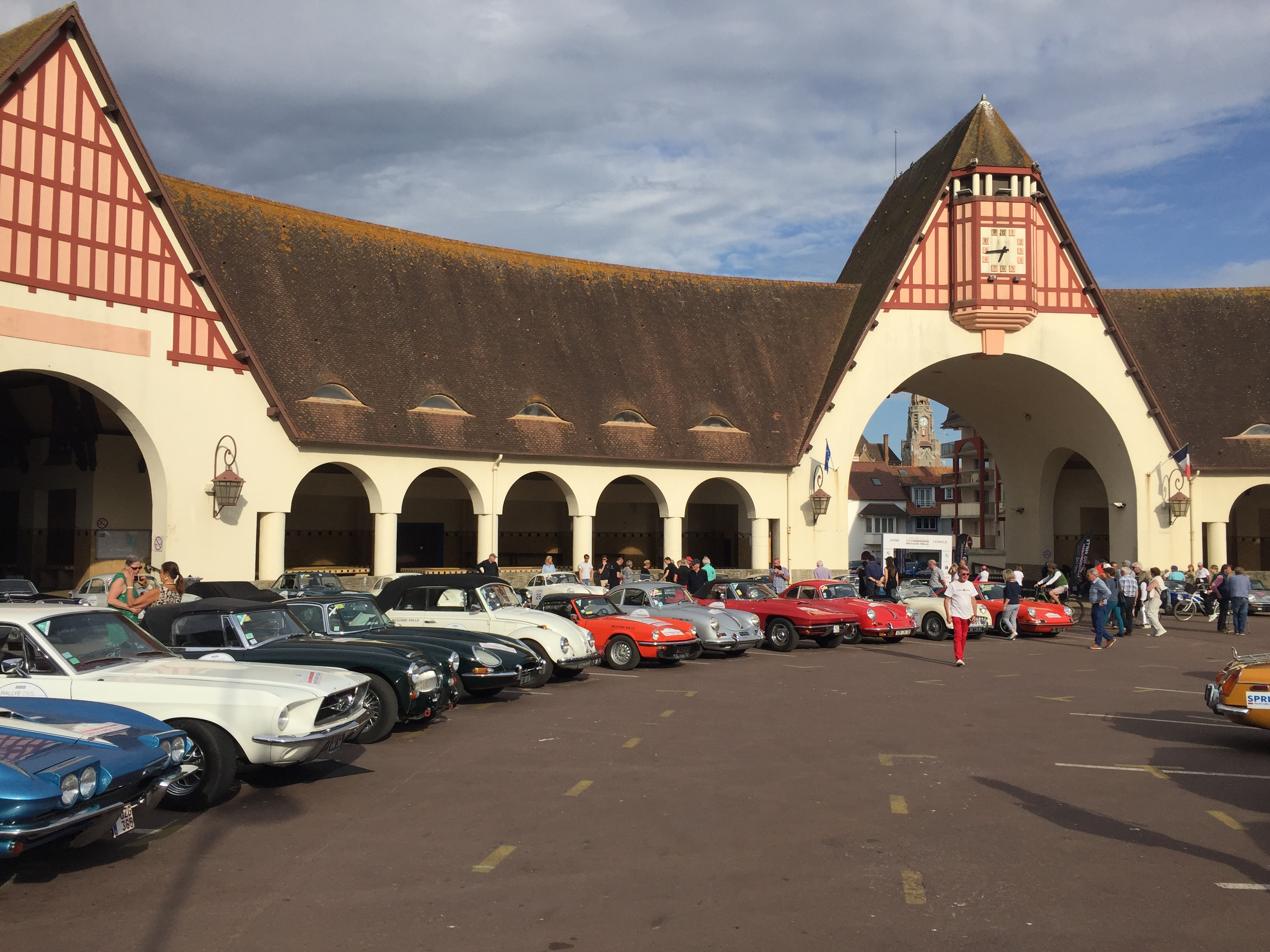
View of part of the indoor market building (1932)

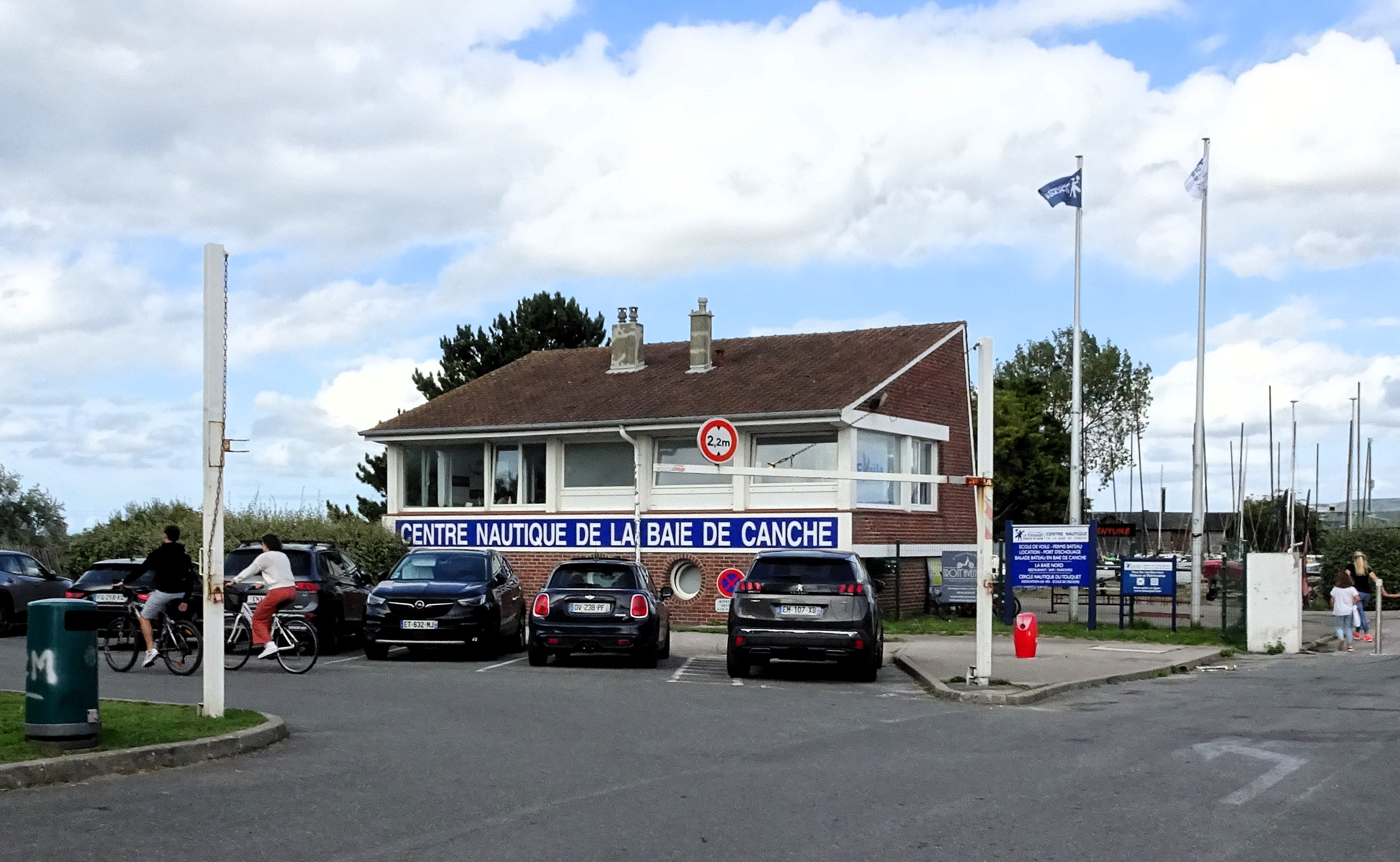
Boat and yacht club facility (1934), as seen today

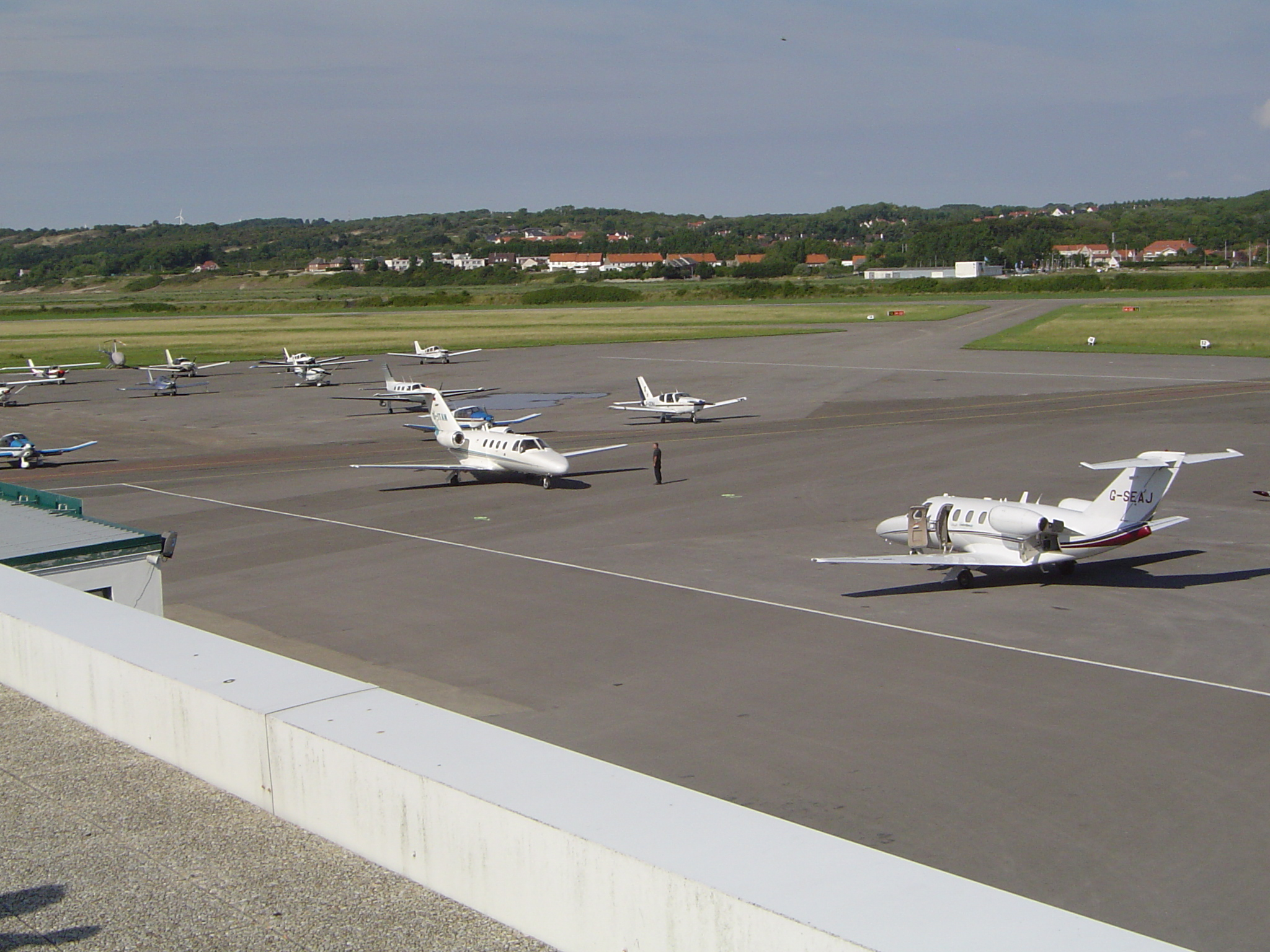
The international airport (1936), view on the ramp

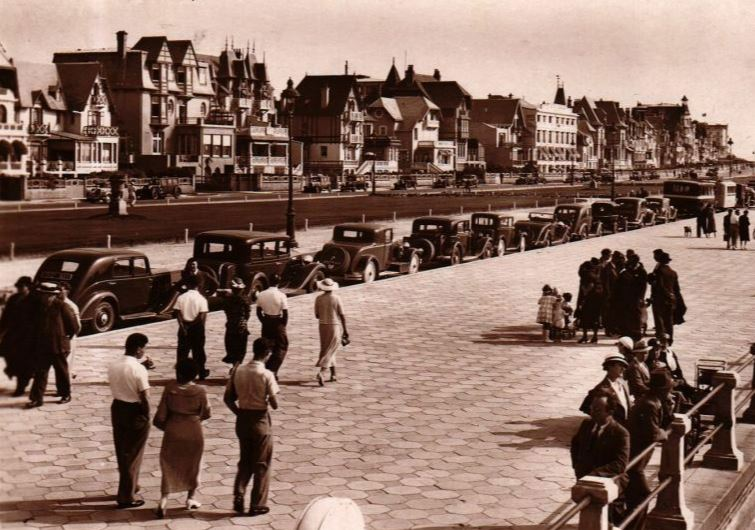
Pre-war view of the seaside promenade

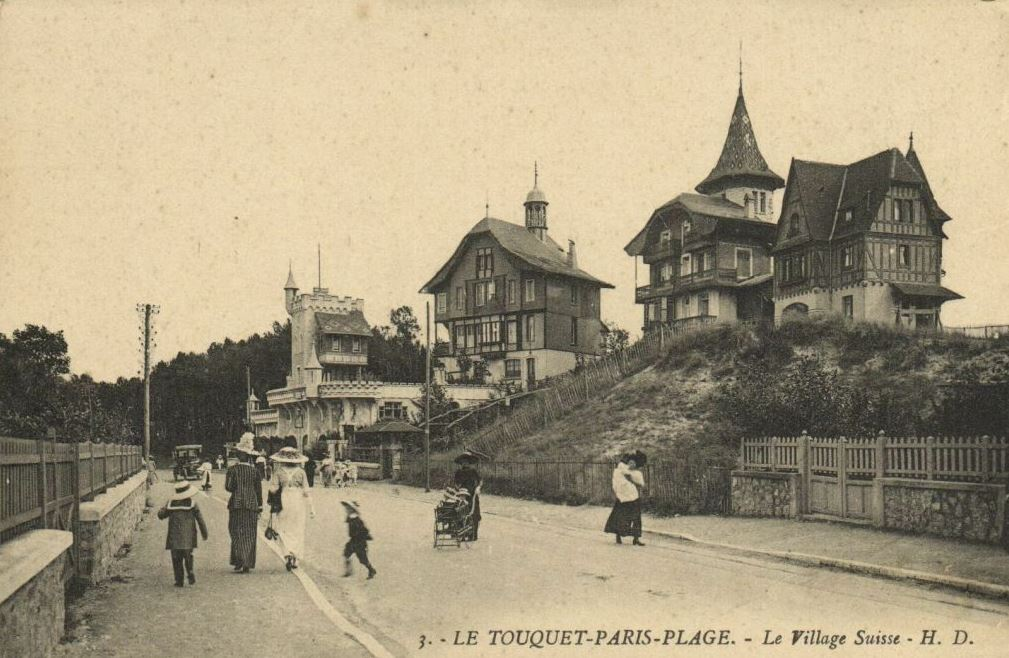
Swiss Village (1906)

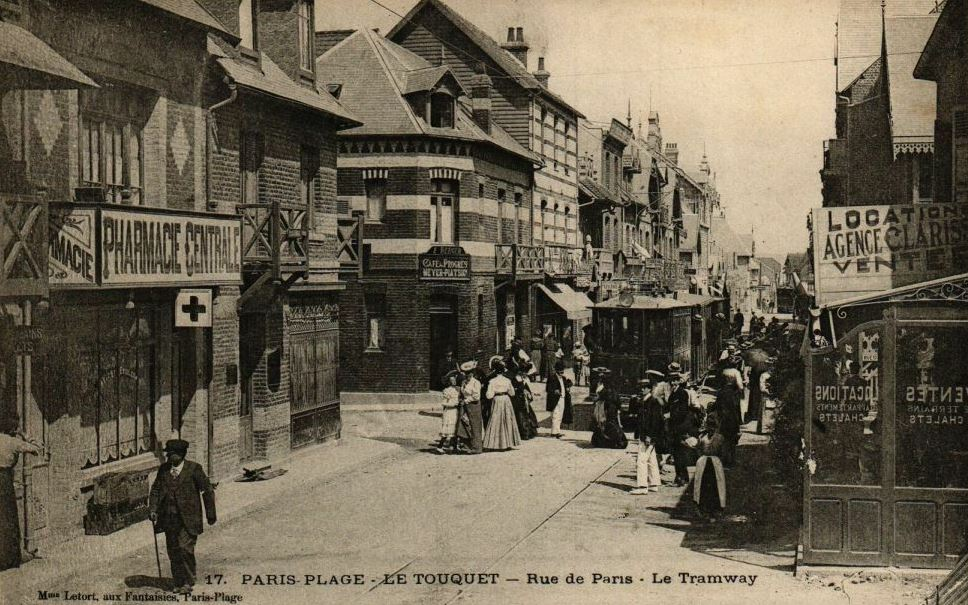
Tram line on the Rue de Paris, the primary business street of pre-war Le Touquet

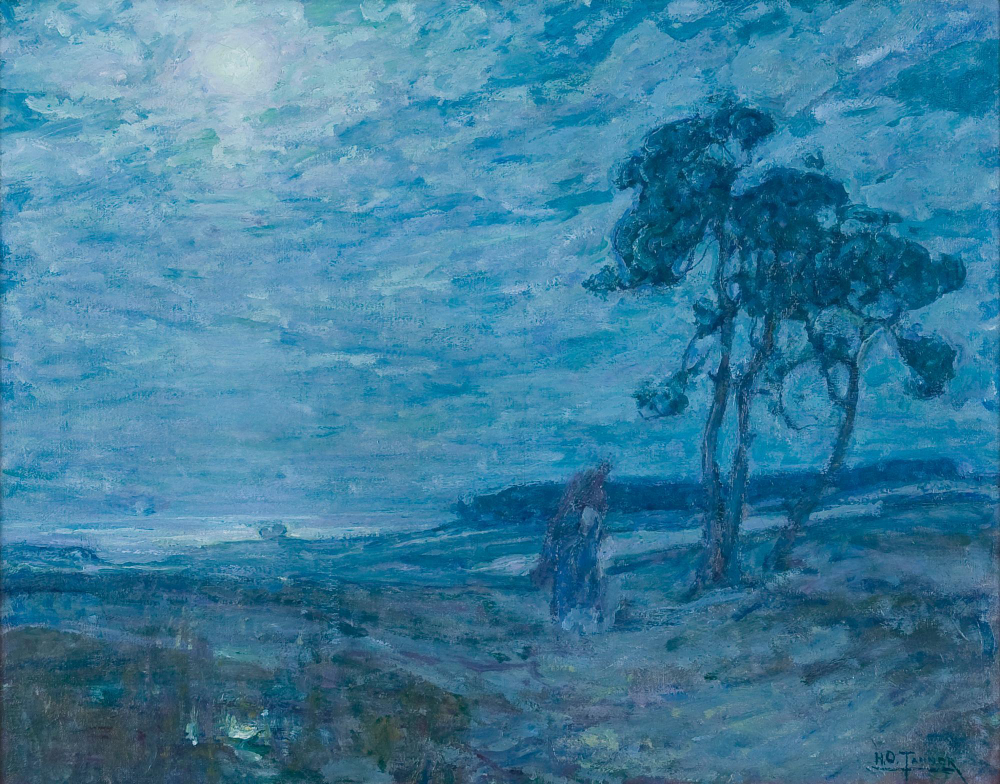
Le Touquet (1913), a painting by Henry Ossawa Tanner

== Wartime destruction ==
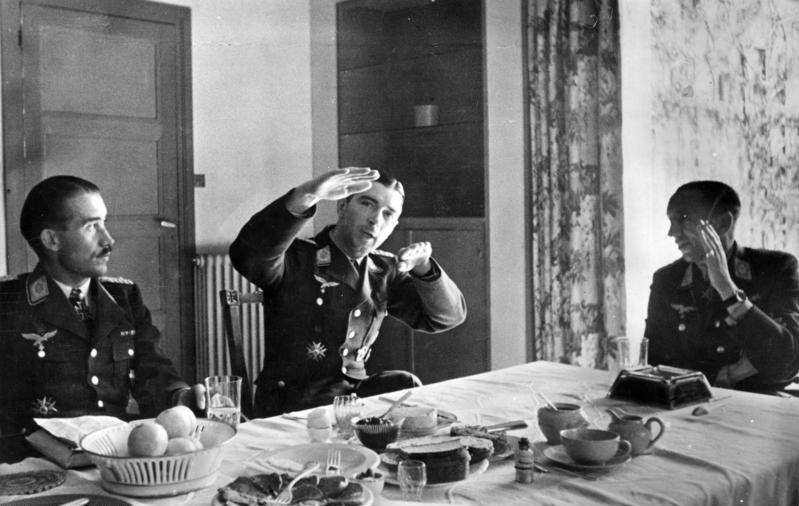
Theo Osterkamp, Generalmajor of the German Luftwaffe (right), celebrating his birthday on 15 April 1941 with fellow officers Adolf Galland (left) and Werner Mölders in Le Touquet. Osterkamp was commanding German air squadrons stationed at the Côte d'Opale region. The local headquarters of the Germans was located in the Royal Picardy.

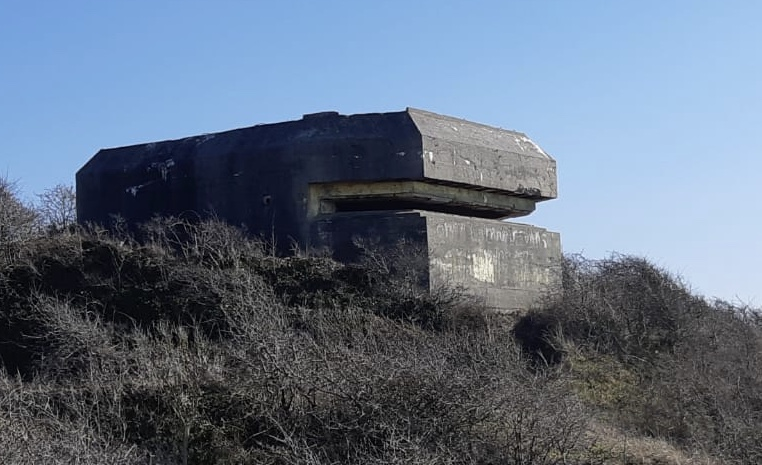
German bunker (Blockhaus) south of Le Touquet, part of the Atlantic Wall

World War II started on 1 September 1939 with the invasion of Poland, and Le Touquet again became a sanitary zone for the military. The city remained under French control for a very short time, as Germany invaded France on 10 May 1940. The Royal Air Force squadron stationed in Le Touquet airport was destroyed, and by 15 May, residents of the resort started to flee. Six days later, two German officers entered the mayoral office and took over the government. There was little intrinsic military value for the seaside resort, but Nazi soldiers quickly introduced military occupation conditions anyway: curfew started at 21:00, all expatriate males had to report daily to the town hall, and Germans commandeered whatever real estate and vehicles they considered fit, without much possibility for legitimate owners' resistance. On 21 July, the Germans ordered all enemy male population younger than 60 (essentially the British) to be interned. This included writer P. G. Wodehouse, who had been living in Le Touquet since 1934. Jules Pouget, long-time mayor of Le Touquet and later senator, was arrested in May 1942 by the Gestapo for being an 'enemy of the Germans'.

Le Touquet again became a de facto military garrison. Already in June 1940, 40,000 Wehrmacht soldiers occupied the town in anticipation of Operation Sea Lion, but the invasion of Great Britain never occurred. Still, the German armed forces set up their local headquarters in the town, as did the National Socialist Motor Corps and the Organisation Todt. Many Belgian, Dutch and Danish workers were housed in Le Touquet to build the Atlantic Wall. As a result of works on this fortification, the town was sealed off from the sea by a 2.5 m (8.2 ft)-high reinforced concrete wall stretching from the Canche estuary and up to Atlantic Hotel at the southern end of the settlement; the ground floors and first floors of all buildings were walled up, and certain buildings, such as the bar near the swimming pool, were demolished. By 1944, the beach was littered with Czech hedgehogs, Rommel's asparagus rigged with explosives, Belgian gates and thousands of landmines; the neighbouring Rue de Paris, the primary business street in pre-war Le Touquet, was also extremely hazardous due to its concentration of explosive devices. Civilian life was heavily restricted: the military banned fishing in the area, access to the beach was prohibited and food rationing was introduced. (Note: In December 1942, the food ration was as follows: 250 g (8.8 oz) of bread per day; 1/4 L (8.8 imp fl oz; 8.5 US fl oz) of milk for children and the elderly per day and 3/4 L (26 imp fl oz; 25 US fl oz) of milk for infants; 180 g (6.3 oz) of meat per week; 10 kg (22 lb) of potatoes, 3 L (110 imp fl oz; 100 US fl oz) of wine, 675 g (23.8 oz) of sugar and 250 g (8.8 oz) of butter per month)

The Allies also had some military plans for the area. In 1943, they launched Operation Starkey, a sham amphibious landing in the vicinity of Boulogne and Le Touquet, but it failed to reach the intended goal of diverting German soldiers from other fronts to northern France. A second diversion immediately preceding D-Day landings, known as Operation Glimmer, had disastrous effects on the city. Over 2,000 bombs were thrown on Le Touquet in June 1944, and at least 51 people, including mayor Jules Pentier, died during the bombings, as well as an unknown number of Organisation Todt labourers. There were no casualties among children because they had been evacuated from the city in February 1944 to a somewhat safer region of Mayenne. The bombardments caused the town dwellers to flee for their lives: while on 4 June, there were still 1,300 people left, the number dwindled to 350 on 9 June and just 5 on 13 June (3 gendarmes and two lighthouse keepers). German defences thinned over the summer as Allied forces advanced in northern France, until the Wehrmacht finally abandoned the city on 4 September, but not before blowing up the two lighthouses from 1852 and the bridge over the Canche at Étaples. The Canadian army liberated Le Touquet the same day.

Demining activities in Le Touquet
- A 1945 newsreel showing the extent to which Le Touquet was mined, just after Liberation. Courtesy Institut national de l'audiovisuel
- A video from 2017 (France 3 Hauts-de-France) showing sappers neutralising and blowing up German explosives
- A news report from 2022 (TF1) about another demining operation

The consequences for the resort were dramatic. The Germans demolished the Atlantic Hotel in 1943 for construction materials. During bombings, the Golf Hotel and the Hôtel des Anglais were destroyed beyond repair, while the Royal Picardy, the Grand-Hôtel and Hotel Hermitage were badly damaged and would eventually cease to be hotels. All villas were commandeered by the Germans, who dealt much damage to the dwellings, and many others suffered under Allied bombardment. There are different estimates of the number of explosive devices that were left in Le Touquet, ranging from 92,745 through 106,745 and up to 137,950, (Note: Despite the different estimates, Saitzek and Saudemont give about the same proportions as to where the mines were located. More than half of the mines were found in the dunes, the airport or the horse racecourse, about 35% were located in the city proper, and about 1 in 8 mines were found inside buildings) but all agree that Le Touquet became the most mined city in France.

== Post-war reconstruction ==
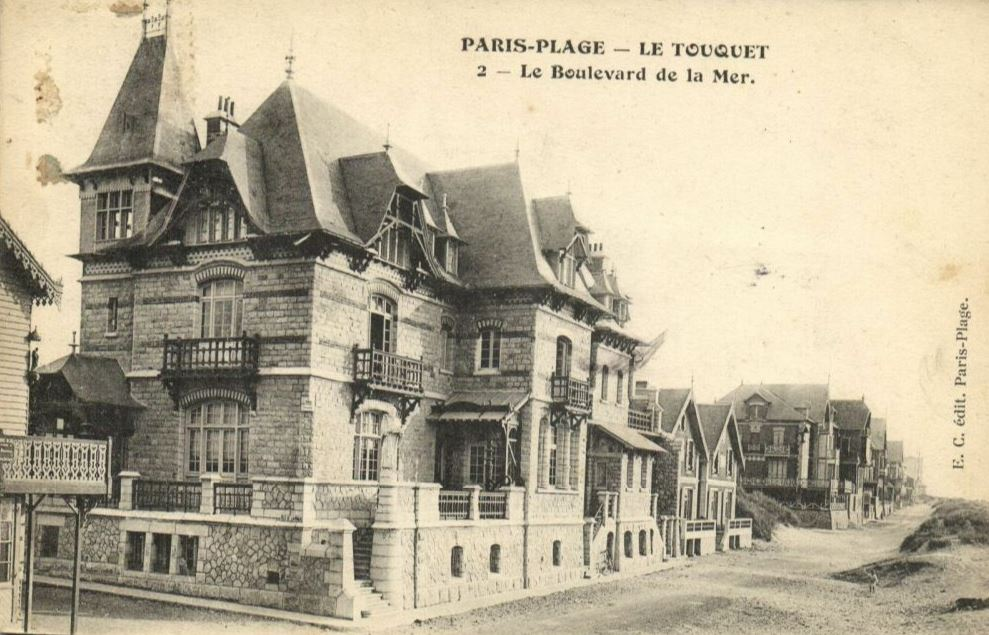
The pre-war architecture on the seaside

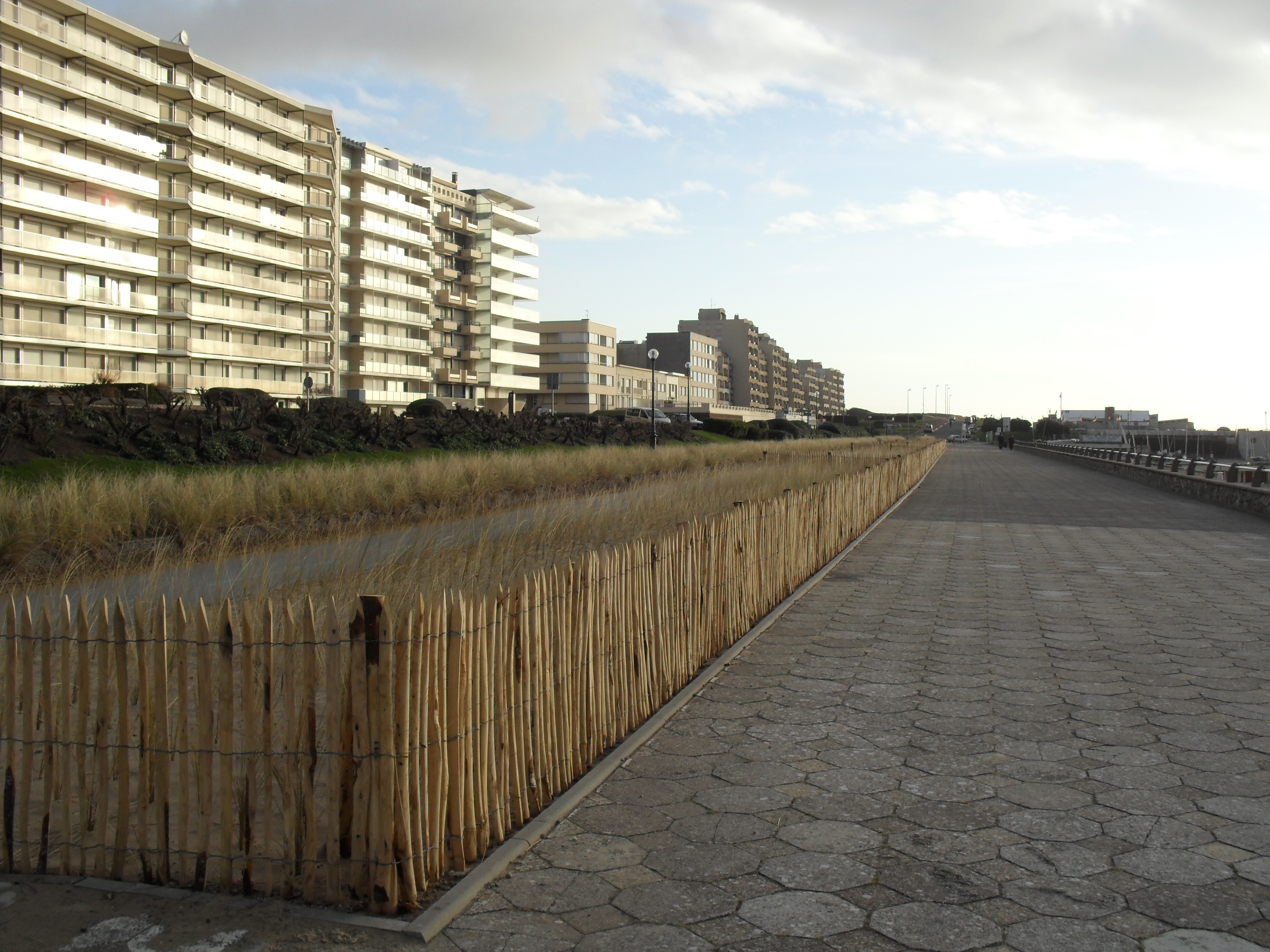
gave way to standard high-rise apartment buildings

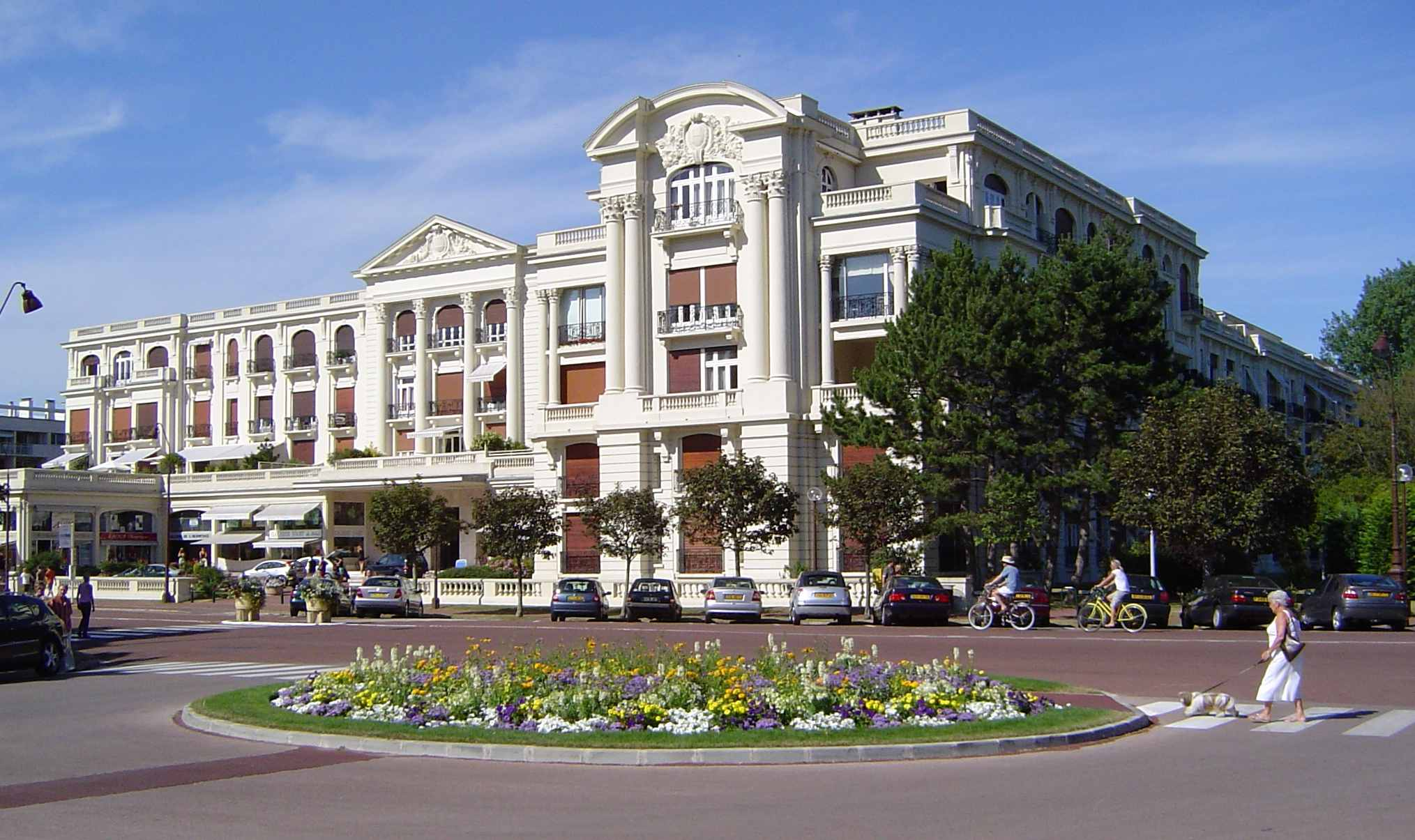
Some buildings found second life, like Hotel Hermitage, when it was rebuilt as an apartment house (1968)

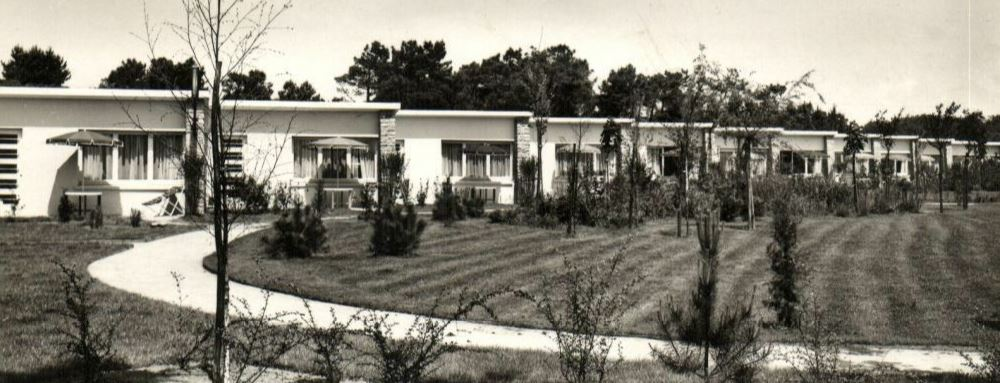
but others had to be demolished. In this case, motel houses were built in 1956 where Golf Hotel previously had stood.

The first post-war years were dedicated to reconstruction and mine clearing. By Pentecost of 1945, Le Touquet's beach opened to visitors, the first in Northern France, but the demining proved taxing. 78 people died and 155 were injured while demining the town within 3 years of Liberation. Many pre-war luxury buildings were destroyed. Out of the seven hors-classe hotels (see pictures above), Hotel Westminster remains the only pre-war luxury hotel still in existence (re-opened in 1946). The Nazis also blew up the original two lighthouses while leaving, therefore the commune ordered to create a new one, which was unveiled in 1951.

Post-war Le Touquet experienced a dramatic shift in tourism. Whereas pre-war Le Touquet was an upper-class resort with overwhelming British presence, by 1965, a survey found that the English were just 11% of all visitors and none of the owners – most of the visitors (59%) were from Pas-de-Calais or Nord departments and a quarter came from the Greater Paris region. This was because after the war, the English sold most of their houses, including many who lost the upper-class status after the war; Parisians, who constituted much of the remainder of pre-war owners, also gave up on the properties in Le Touquet. These houses found eager buyers in locals, mainly relatively well-off lawyers, doctors and company directors from small towns and cities in the region. Le Touquet was on low tourism development priority for the central government, which focused its efforts on the much warmer and sunnier resorts of the French Riviera instead. As that region already had had a notable presence of elites and was becoming more accessible with better transport, the high society increasingly chose spend their vacations on the Mediterranean coast rather than on the English Channel. This is why Le Touquet, while still relatively successful compared to other beach towns in the north of France, became more of a regional point of interest rather than a national or international attraction. The echo of pre-war tourism trends remained in Hotel Westminster (and, to a lesser extent, three- and four-star hotels), whose customers still were rich British people arriving by plane.

In response to market pressures, the relatively small pre-war villas (most of which were rebuilt) were replaced by high-rise apartment buildings on the sea shore. In 1961, the first large scale residence, consisting of nine storeys and 20 apartments, was built; several more followed. A 2004 report was very critical of such development, saying that this "denatured" the sea-front and made it look like a "giant parking lot". In total, by 2020, only 16% of residences have been built before 1945.

Meanwhile, the town, under the new leadership of Léonce Deprez, also saw a new strategy for the resort that was supposed to make Le Touquet a "year-round resort". In 1974, Le Touquet opened an indoor thalassotherapy institute, and two hotels flanking the establishment were completed later (a Novotel today housing 149 rooms and an Ibis with 91 rooms). An enduro motorcycle race, today known as Enduropale, was first held in February 1975 with 286 participants. A flea market of antique items was launched for autumn. In the meantime, a vocational school for hotel-related occupations (lycée hôtelier) was opened on the site of the Royal Picardy, whose reconstruction was deemed not feasible. This 1972 building was built to resemble a pine cone. 1970s also saw the commune of Le Touquet buy numerous properties, including the horse racecourse, the tennis courts, the casino and the concert hall.

A new push for the city's development came in the late 80s and early 90s with the construction of the Channel Tunnel. The French motorway network (A16 autoroute) reached the settlement in 1994, which gave easy access to the beaches for Parisians. As for the English, they were increasingly going to France for shopping as exchange rates were favourable, but their share of ownership of houses remained low. The commune increasingly became populated by pensioners, which, as of 2014, constitute more than half of the population of Le Touquet.
