= Emporium (early medieval) =

Early medieval trading settlements in northern Europe

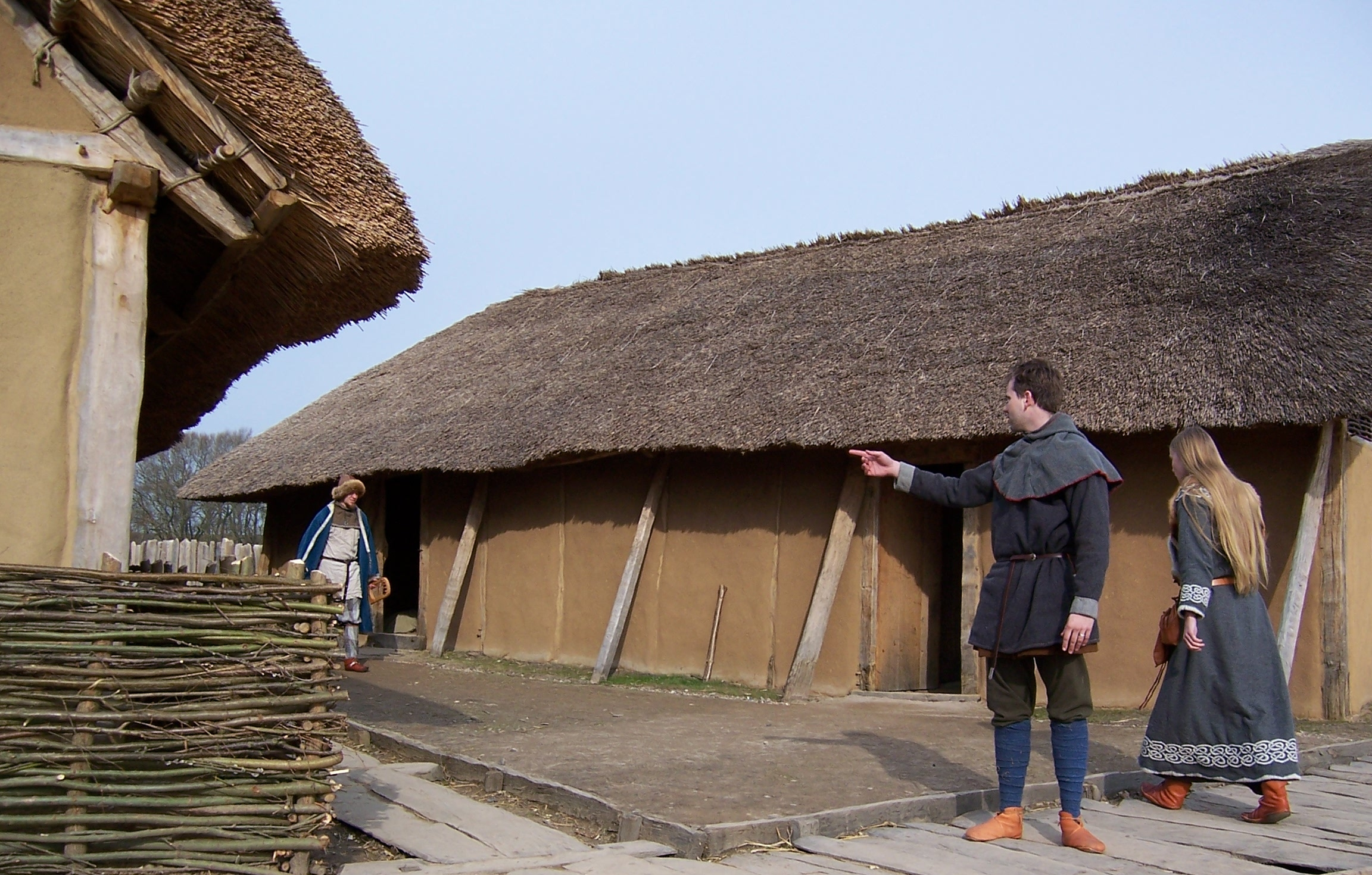
Reconstructed houses at Hedeby

An emporium (plural: emporia) was a type of trading and craft-producing settlement that developed in parts of Western Europe and Northern Europe during the Early Middle Ages, particularly from the 7th century onwards. In Anglo-Saxon England, some comparable settlements are known as wics or wic towns. Examples include Dorestad, Quentovic, Gipeswic, Hamwic, Lundenwic, Ribe, Hedeby, Kaupang, Birka and Truso.

Emporia were important centres of trade and craft production and formed part of wider networks of maritime and riverine exchange. Archaeological evidence from them includes coins, weights, imported goods, workshops and production waste. Their inhabitants were involved not only in long-distance trade but also in local production and exchange with surrounding regions.

== Terminology and characteristics ==
The word emporium comes from the Ancient Greek ἐμπόριον, meaning a place of trade or market. Its use for early medieval northern European settlements is a modern scholarly convention. The settlements grouped under the term varied considerably in size, organization, chronology and permanence, so emporium does not describe a single, uniform settlement type.

Many emporia occupied locations favourable to transport, particularly along coasts, estuaries and rivers. Their positions allowed goods to move between maritime routes and inland regions. Hedeby, for example, occupied a strategic position on the Jutland peninsula at a major route between the North Sea and Baltic Sea, and between Scandinavia and the Frankish Empire. Its location made it an important trading hub between continental Europe and Scandinavia and between the two seas.

Emporia also developed in different political and geographical settings. Major examples in Scandinavia include Ribe, Hedeby, Kaupang and Birka, while trading settlements developed around the North Sea and Baltic regions, including Dorestad, Quentovic, Hamwic, Lundenwic and Truso. These settlements were connected by maritime and riverine networks, although their individual functions, chronology and relationship with political authorities varied.

The distinction between emporia, markets, wics and other trading sites is not always clear. In Anglo-Saxon archaeology, the term productive site is also used for places producing large quantities of coins and metalwork, including sites identified through metal detecting. Such sites cannot automatically be equated with excavated emporia.

== Trade and craft production ==
Emporia participated in regional and long-distance exchange networks. Finds of coins, weights, jewellery, glass, pottery, textiles and other objects demonstrate connections between different parts of northern and western Europe. At the same time, archaeological evidence shows that these settlements were centres of local and specialized craft production.

Craft activities included metalworking, textile production, pottery and the working of bone, antler and other materials. Production waste and unfinished objects can identify workshops and provide evidence for the organization of manufacturing within individual settlements. Recent research has emphasized the importance of craft production within the economies of the emporia rather than treating these settlements primarily as places of trade.

Antler, bone, horn and ivory working is particularly well represented archaeologically. Waste materials, unfinished objects and finished products can help identify workshops and provide evidence for the duration and scale of production. Research into these crafts has also contributed to wider interpretations of the economic and social organization of emporia.

Coinage was increasingly important in parts of northern Europe during the period in which the emporia developed. Silver coins, bullion, balances and weights have been found at trading settlements, indicating the use of both coinage and weighed metal in exchange. The importance and composition of monetary finds varied between settlements and periods, however, and they need to be interpreted alongside other archaeological evidence.

== Settlement and permanence ==
Early interpretations sometimes treated emporia as seasonal marketplaces. Archaeological research has shown that this was not universally the case. At Ribe, for example, Sarah Croix has argued that at least parts of the marketplace were permanently occupied from the first decades of the settlement's existence in the early 8th century, based on evidence including domestic activity and houses.

The degree of permanence varied between settlements. Some emporia developed characteristics associated with towns, while others were smaller, less permanent or eventually abandoned. The boundary between an emporium and an early medieval town is therefore not always straightforward.

== Decline and transformation ==
Many emporia changed substantially during the 9th and 10th centuries. Some declined or were abandoned, while others continued, shifted location or developed into later towns. Changes in political organization, warfare, transport routes and patterns of exchange contributed to the transformation of individual settlements, but the causes and chronology differed between sites.

The process was not uniform. At Lundenwic, the Middle Saxon settlement outside the former Roman city of London declined during the later 8th and 9th centuries, followed by renewed urban activity within the former Roman walls at Lundenburh. Archaeological research indicates a discontinuity between the two settlements, making the transition more complex than a simple replacement at a single date.

Hedeby, by contrast, remained an important trading centre for more than three centuries. UNESCO describes it as one of the largest and most important emporia of Western and Northern Europe during the Viking Age, with archaeological evidence for trade and exchange between the 8th and 11th centuries, before the settlement was eventually abandoned.

The emergence of later medieval towns should therefore not be understood simply as the replacement of all emporia at a single date. Some settlements continued, some changed location or function, and others disappeared as economic, political and military conditions changed.

== Historiography ==
The study of emporia has played an important role in interpretations of the development of trade and towns in early medieval Europe. Henri Pirenne's theories about the transformation of European commerce after the Roman period influenced later debates, while Richard Hodges emphasized the role of rulers and long-distance exchange in the development of early medieval trading centres.

Later archaeological research has made these interpretations more complex. Greater attention has been given to local and regional exchange, craft production, settlement permanence and the roles of merchants and craftspeople. The discovery of new sites and the reinterpretation of older excavations have also made it difficult to apply a single model to all emporia.

The archaeological evidence from Ribe, for example, has challenged the assumption that early emporia were necessarily seasonal, while research into craft production has demonstrated that manufacturing could be an important part of their economies.

== See also ==
- Market town
- Medieval archaeology
- Viking Age
- Anglo-Saxon England
- History of trade
