= Quentovic =

Frankish emporium in the Early Middle Ages near the English Channel

Coordinates: 50.4825°N 1.7213°E

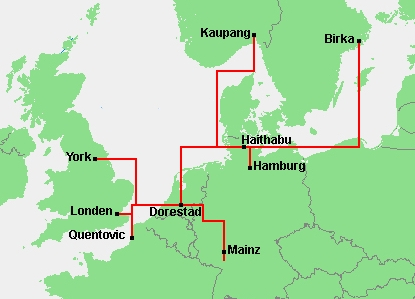
Quentovic and surrounding trade routes

Quentovic was a Frankish emporium in the Early Middle Ages, located on the European continent close to the English Channel. The town no longer exists, but it was thought to have been situated near the mouth of the Canche River in what is today the French commune of Étaples. Archaeological discoveries by David Hill in the 1980s found that the actual location of Quentovic was east of Étaples, in what is now the commune of La Calotterie.

Quentovic was an important trading hub for the Franks and its port linked the continent to the southeastern county of Kent, in England. Quentovic was likely founded by a Neustrian king in the early 6th century. It was one of the two most prominent Frankish ports in the north (the other being Dorestad) until it was abandoned, probably in the 11th century. Merchants were drawn to this place because the number of trading posts at the time was limited. Quentovic was also where Anglo-Saxon monks would cross the English Channel when on pilgrimage to Rome. Important historical evidence on Quentovic comes from documents of taxation and through the town's minting of coinage, but otherwise there is limited physical evidence of the town's activities. Coins minted there during both the Merovingian and Carolingian dynasties have been discovered.

== Merovingian Period ==
The Merovingian dynasty began in 481 CE and lasted until they were succeeded by the Carolingians in the 750s. Quentovic may have existed in the final decades of the 5th century, although it was more likely established in the early 6th century. The earliest minted coins from Quentovic date from the 6th century. The town was likely created to benefit long-distance trade and to control the frontiers of the recently solidified empire. In its early years, Quentovic was probably a simple fairground where trading occurred and a debarkation point to Kent in Anglo-Saxon England. Merchants located in Quentovic were primarily Frankish, Saxon, or Frisian. Structures probably included permanent shelters and warehouses to store mercantile goods during the winter months. Trade with the Anglo-Saxons, mainly in Kent (and possibly in Hampshire), was vital for the community. Exports to England included textiles, wine, and quern-stones. Pottery bottles, glasses, textiles, and gold coins produced by Franks in the early 8th century have been discovered in modern Kent. Slaves and other goods were also exchanged in Quentovic.

The earliest written mention of Quentovic was formerly believed to have been in a charter by Dagobert I. It concerned merchants who were travelling to the fair of St-Denis to trade. This charter is now recognized to be a forgery and was most likely written by someone else in the late 9th century.

During the Merovingian period (and the Carolingian), Quentovic was the primary landing spot for Anglo-Saxon monks on pilgrimages to Rome. English missionaries also set out from Quentovic in the late seventh and early eighth centuries to journey east of the Rhine River. The English historian Bede claimed that pilgrims did this because they assumed that they were ethnically related to the pagans of that region.

Prior to Frankish records, Bede is one of the first to mention Quentovic in text, in his Ecclesiastical History. Bede states that Egbert, King of Kent, sent Raedfrid to travel with Archbishop Theodore to Francia in 668 CE. Near the beginning of their journey, Theodore fell ill and was in need of rest. Raedfrid was forced to acquire permission from Ebroin, the mayor of the palace of Neustria, to go to Quentovic. Ebroin is also mentioned by the Anglo-Saxon priest Stephanus, in the only other literary text of this time period which mentions Quentovic. In the Life of Wilfrid, Stephanus described bishop Wilfrid's attempts to appeal to Rome against the division of his diocese in 678 CE. Wilfrid's opponents sent gifts to Ebroin and Theuderic III, the king of Neustria, to turn them against Wilfrid. The two rulers decided to intercept Wilfrid at Quentovic, but mistakenly seized the bishop Winfrid of Lichfield instead.

In 716 CE, Ceolfrith, the abbot of Monkwearmouth-Jarrow Abbey, sought letters of introduction in Quentovic for his excursion through Francia. Documentation was likely a requirement to enter the continent from England. As a port, Quentovic was closely supervised by Frankish authorities, and this supervision only increased when the Carolingians took control of Francia in 751 CE.

== Carolingian Period ==
In the Carolingian period, Quentovic was still a principal Frankish port for English trade. During this time, governmental oversight of the port was tightened. Merchants in Quentovic were required to pay indirect taxes on most goods, but most merchants elsewhere in the empire were exempt from paying taxes. This royal toll, at its height, amounted to 10% per exchange in Quentovic. These taxes were essential for Charlemagne to fund his military forces. Quentovic was also where Frankish ambassadors departed from to conduct diplomacy with King Offa of Mercia.

During Charlemagne's reign, various monasteries applied to purchase warehouses in Quentovic. These recorded monasteries include: St-Vaast, St-Riquier, St-Bertin, St-Germain-des-Prés, St-Wandrille, and Ferrières. When Frankish monasteries wanted goods that could not be found in the surrounding area, they would seek the supplies through trade. One such record details a Frankish church requesting lead for roof construction. In 779 CE, Charlemagne granted the abbey of St-Germain-des-Prés an exemption from the royal tax. This same abbey was also exempt in Rouen, Amiens, Dorestad, and Maastricht. Later, Charlemagne appointed abbots to directly control the taxation process and report to him as procurators. Gervold of St-Wandrille was given the position of procurator in the late 8th century. This procurator's role was to control foreign trade and monitor customs in a geographic area that included Quentovic.

== Quentovic Coinage ==
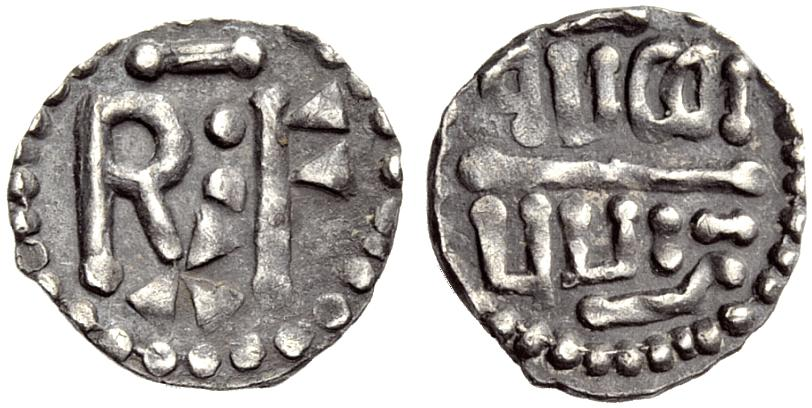
Denier of Pippin III, minted at Quentovic between c. 754–768.

The coins minted in Quentovic comprise the most extensive evidence of the settlement that survives today, with the oldest known coins dating from the 560s. These coins all have some form of the town's name stamped on them. The mint of Quentovic produced gold trientes in the first half of the 7th century, with an image of the royal bust and the moneyer's name on them. In approximately 670 CE, Merovingian gold coinage stopped being produced. In its place, silver was used for coins which the Franks called sceattas. They were also minted in Quentovic in the late 7th and early 8th centuries. The coinage was used mainly for mercantile purposes in the town's flourishing maritime industry.

When the Carolingian dynasty took over in 751 CE, coins continued to be minted in Quentovic under Pippin III. However, coins minted in Quentovic under Charlemagne and Louis the Pious are rare finds. During that period, Melle, Chartres, Paris, Orléans, and Rheims had become more prominent mints.

Historians have argued that, by the second half of the 9th century, Quentovic was in decline. The Edict of Pistres in 864 CE is the last textual reference to Quentovic. The edict likely sparked a brief resurgence of the mint, since coins made Charles the Bald are more common finds than those in decades prior. After the edict's reforms, the amount of silver in these coins also increased significantly. Little evidence exists today of Quentovic coins minted in the 10th century, and no written text from this time mentions Quentovic, leading historians to suggest that the port town had once again declined. The last coin known to have been produced in Quentovic is dated to 980 CE.

== Abandonment ==
It is difficult to determine when Quentovic was fully abandoned. The town was raided by Vikings in 842 CE and only remained under Frankish control because of the tribute paid by Charles the Bald. Subsequent raids followed, but the emporium recovered later in the century. The raids may have damaged Quentovic's economy, and merchants likely left to seek markets with better protection. In the 10th century, Quentovic seems to have been replaced by other ports that were accessible to England and better fortified, such as Montreuil-sur-Mer and Saint-Omer.

Archaeological digs have found pottery in the area dated as late as the 10th century. There has also been fragments of potash glass, which is usually dated near the end of the 11th century. Another possible contributor to the town's decline could have been flooding or rising sea levels. It also may have been difficult for ships of increased size to dock at the port. The exact reasons for the town's decay are unknown, although it is widely believed that it was a gradual abandonment, which concluded in the early 11th century, rather than a sudden departure of the town's population.
