= Royal Picardy =

Former French Hotel

Coordinates: 50°31′03″N 1°35′45″E

Royal Picardy

The Royal Picardy was a luxury hotel in Le Touquet-Paris-Plage, France which was built in 1929 on plans drawn by architects Louis Debrouwer and Pierre Drobecq and which was demolished at the end of the 1960s. With its 500 bedrooms, it was at the time advertised as the most beautiful hotel in the world.

== History ==
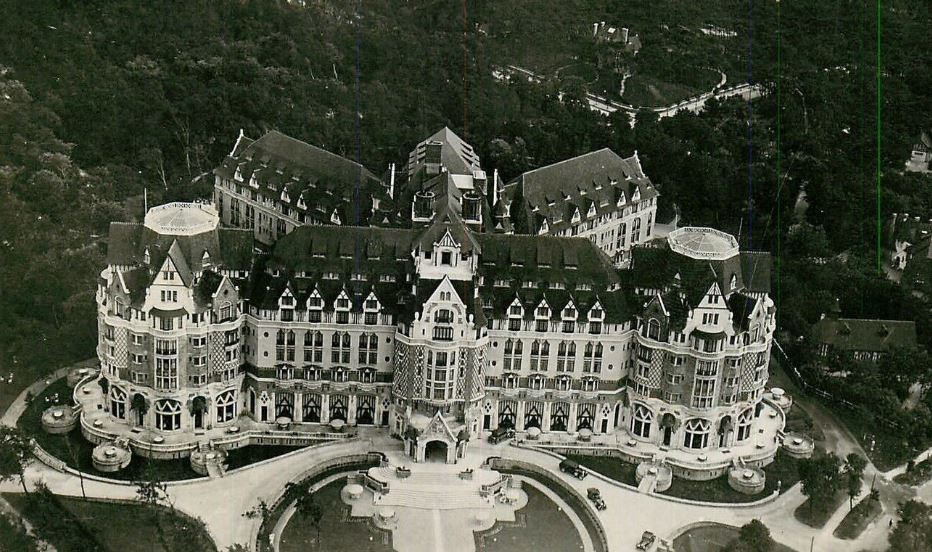
Royal Picardy

The construction of this huge building started on November 20, 1928, was interrupted twice (due to bad weather and due to a strike of the construction workers), and the first rooms opened in the summer of 1929 and the grand opening took place in April 1930.

The building was damaged by bombing during the war. the Royal Picardy was closed for good in 1951 and the city of Le Touquet purchased it in 1967. It was demolished in 1968 and a hotel school was built on the same grounds which opened on October 1, 1972.

== Characteristics ==
The Royal Picardy was a 9 floor building, 40 metres in height and had 500 rooms (all different, all with a bathroom), 50 apartments from 5 to 10 rooms among which a few with a swimming pool, 120 lounges. It was equipped with a 25 metre pool with sanitized and heated water, a fitness room, a hammam, a mini-golf, a squash ground, and phone in all rooms and lounges. Its garage could accommodate 100 cars. It was surrounded by a 6 ha park.

Each of the large apartments had a master bedroom, a luxurious salon, a bathroom - pool, a kitchen for the meals in the bedroom itself, and room for the housemaid or butler.

== In the media ==
In 1968, the Royal Picardy was the subject of a television documentary produced by Yorkshire Television and presented by broadcaster Alan Whicker.
