= La Calotterie =

- Commune
- Chateau

- Coat of arms
- Location of La Calotterie
- Location within France Location within Hauts-de-France
- Coordinates: 50°28′36″N 1°43′41″E
- Country: France
- Region: Hauts-de-France
- Department: Pas-de-Calais
- Arrondissement: Montreuil
- Canton: Berck
- Intercommunality: CA Deux Baies en Montreuillois

Government
  - Mayor (2020–2026): Franck Leurette
- Area^{1}: 9.48 km^{2} (3.66 sq mi)
- Elevation: 5 m (16 ft)
- Highest elevation: 58 m (190 ft)
- Lowest elevation: 2 m (6.6 ft)
- Population (2023): 582
  - Density: 61.4/km^{2} (159/sq mi)
- Time zone: UTC+01:00 (CET)
  - Summer (DST): UTC+02:00 (CEST)
- INSEE/Postal code: 62196 /62170
- ^{1} French Land Register data, which excludes lakes, ponds, glaciers > 1 km^{2} (0.386 sq mi or 247 acres) and river estuaries.

La Calotterie (French pronunciation: [la kalɔtʁi]) is a commune in the Pas-de-Calais department in the Hauts-de-France region of France.

== Geography ==
A small village situated some 2 miles (3 km) northwest of Montreuil-sur-Mer at the D146 and D149 crossroads.

== Population ==
Historical population
Year	Pop.	±% p.a.
1968	332	—
1975	357	+1.04%
1982	401	+1.67%
1990	550	+4.03%
1999	559	+0.18%
2007	597	+0.83%
2012	650	+1.72%
2017	643	−0.22%
2023	582	−1.65%
Source: INSEE

== Visemarest and Quentovic ==
Close to the village of La Calotterie is the hamlet of Visemarest. Excavations coordinated by Dr David Hill of Manchester University between 1984 and 1991 uncovered the remains of a substantial early-medieval settlement there. This is now accepted as the site of the port and trading settlement of Quentovic or 'Quentovicus', although the finds from the excavations are located in the Musée de Quentovic in Étaples (the museum predating the discovery of the site itself by a number of years).

== Places of interest ==
- The church of St. Firmin, dating from the eighteenth century.
- Three Chateaux nearby.

== See also ==
- Communes of the Pas-de-Calais department
