= Allen Stoneham =

British sportsman and businessman

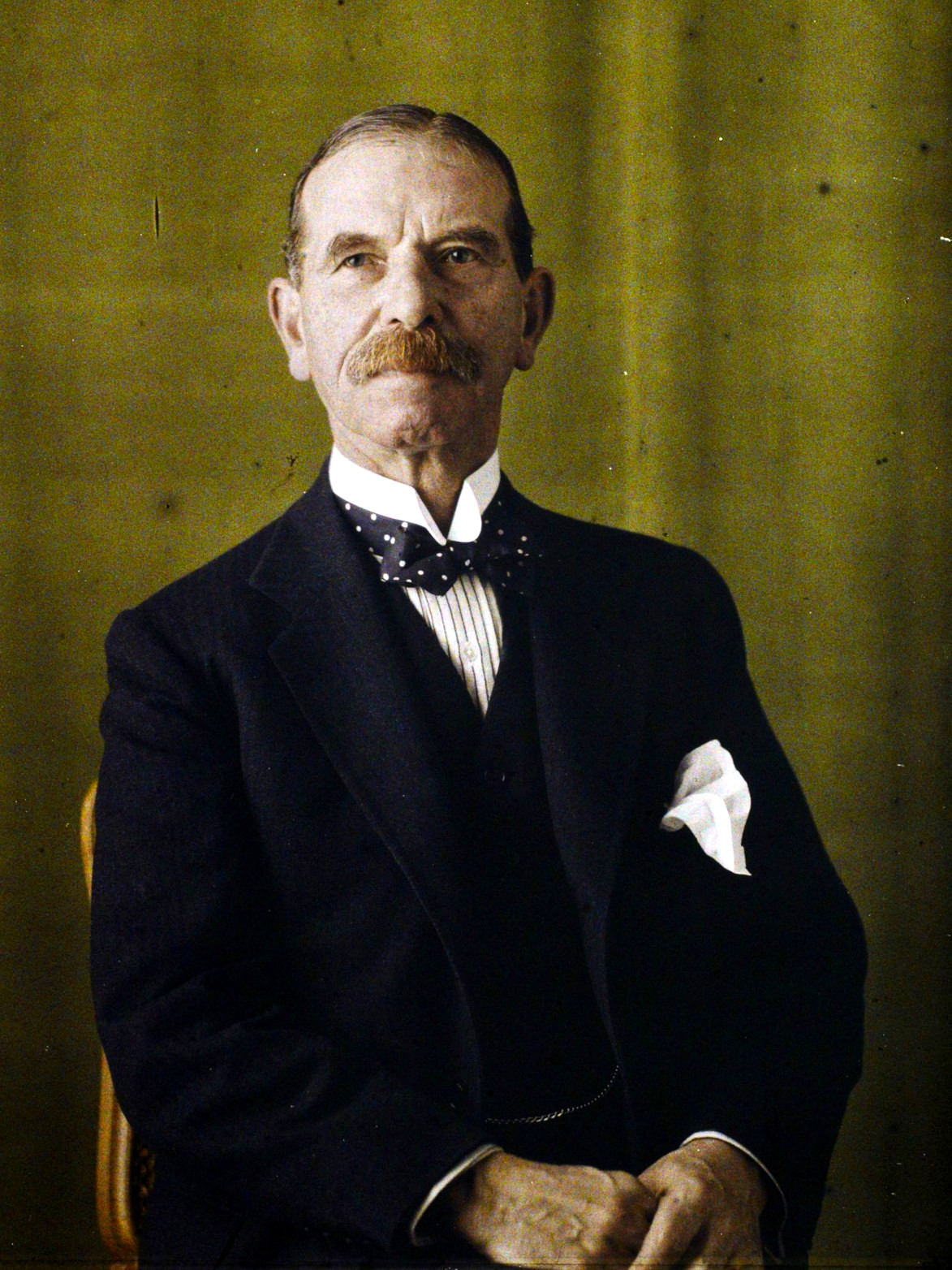
1925 Autochrome by Georges Chevalier

Allen Henry Philip Stoneham (1856–1927) was a British sportsman, businessman and Financial Secretary of the Board of Trade.

== Biography ==
He was a son of Allen Stoneham. He was educated at the City of London School and at London University. In his youth he was a prominent athlete, gaining many L.A.C. and other prizes. He won the Civil Service Quarter Mile Handicap. He also played rugby for the Queen's House, one of the twenty-one original members of the Rugby Football Union.

Stoneham was responsible for the introduction of electric tramways into Western Australia and Victoria, and was the donor of the statue of Queen Victoria to the City of Perth W.A.

In 1902, Stoneham and John Robinson Whitley (1843–1922) bought land in Northern France, through their company Le Touquet Syndicate Ltd., and were instrumental in developing the town into the golf and gambling resort at Le Touquet. From 1902 until his death in 1927, he devoted himself to the development of the town.

After the outbreak of the World War I he offered the domain of Le Touquet for the use of the British Army. For his services he was appointed an Officer of the Order of the British Empire.

Family life

His first marriage was with Jane Harley Cowie born in 1853 in Scotland. They had 3 daughters born in Surbiton Irene in 1884, Linda in 1886 and Phyllis in 1889. His wife's brother John James Milroy Cowie was a famous sprinter in the early 1880s winning the AAA 100yards and 400yards and breaking the 220 yard world record in 1883. His son in law was Roland Clive Wallace Burn (married to Phyllis).

He married again, after the death of his first wife in 1899, to Florence Marie Louise born in Montreal, Canada. They had two children, Donald and Vincent.
