= 800s (decade) =

Decade

The 800s decade ran from January 1, 800, to December 31, 809.

== Events ==
=== 800 ===
==== Europe ====
- December 25 – Charlemagne, king of the Franks, is crowned Holy Roman Emperor by Pope Leo III as Charles I, with the title "Emperor of the Romans". The coronation takes place during Mass at the Basilica of St. Peter in Rome, on Christmas Day. The Frankish Empire is formed in Western Europe, which is not recognized by Empress Irene at Constantinople. This triggers a series of disputes with the Byzantines around who is officially ruling the former Western Roman Empire.
- The Rus' Khaganate is created by people who are called Rus', after the 182-year dominance of the Khazars. This is the starting period of the rise of the Kievan Rus', and the later states of Russia, Belarus and Ukraine (approximate date).
- King Eardwulf of Northumbria has his men seize Prince Ealhmund, son of the late King Alhred, and put him to death. He is buried at Derby in St. Alkmund's Church, and later revered as a saint (approximate date).
- The Abbasid Caliphate is forced to cede their holdings in southern Italy to the Aghlabid Dynasty.

==== Asia ====
- The ci, a new type of lyric poetry with irregular lines, is set to a melody during the Tang Dynasty (approximate date).

==== Africa ====
- Sijilmasa (in present-day Morocco) is founded as the departure point for caravans between North Africa and the western Sudan (approximate date).
- Ife, in present-day Nigeria, becomes an important urban center (approximate date).
- The Abbasid Caliphate is forced to cede Ifriqiya (present-day north-eastern Algeria, Tunisia and western Libya) to the Aghlabid Dynasty.

====== Central America ======
- June 28 – Ochk'in Kaloomte' Aj Ho' Baak becomes the new ruler of the Mayan city state of Machaquila in Guatemala and reigns until his death in 815.
- Itza culture starts in Mesoamerica (840).

==== Polynesia ====
- The first settlers of the Hawaiian Islands arrive (approximate date).

==== By topic ====
====== Religion ======
- Archbishop Hygeberht of Lichfield retires; he is succeeded by Ealdwulf. King Coenwulf of Mercia is on better terms with the archbishopric of Canterbury than his predecessor, and unsuccessfully attempts to have the Mercian archiepiscopal see transferred to London (approximate date).
- The Book of Kells is written and illuminated in a Columban monastery, in Ireland (approximate date).

=== 801 ===
==== By place ====
====== Europe ======
- April 3 – King Louis the Pious, son of Charlemagne, captures Barcelona after a siege of several months. Bera is appointed first count of Barcelona.
- April 29 – Earthquake in Rome and Spoleto.
- Emperor Charlemagne formally cedes Nordalbian territory (modern-day Schleswig-Holstein) to the pagan Obotrites (allies of the Carolingian Empire).

====== Britain ======
- King Eardwulf of Northumbria leads an army into Mercia against his rival, Coenwulf, in order to flush out other claimants to the Northumbrian throne.
- A synod appears to have been held at Chelsea, as an extant charter (Sawyer 158) records a confirmation of a land grant by Coenwulf, the king of Mercia that was part of the council's proceedings.

==== By topic ====
====== Religion ======
- Rabanus Maurus, Frankish Benedictine monk, takes his vows in the monastery of Fulda and receives ordination as a deacon.

=== 802 ===
==== By place ====
====== Byzantine Empire ======
- October 31 – Empress Irene is deposed after a 5-year reign, and banished to Lesbos. High-ranking patricians place Nikephoros, the minister of finance (logothetes tou genikou), on the throne. He is crowned in the Hagia Sophia at Constantinople, by Patriarch Tarasios, as emperor of the Byzantine Empire.

====== Central America ======
- May 1 – Lachan Kʼawiil Ajaw Bot (born June 25, 760) becomes the ruler of the Mayan city state near Itzan in Guatemala.

====== Europe ======
- Pagan Danes invade Obodrite-ruled Schleswig, to take over territory almost emptied by the forcible deportations of the Saxons by emperor Charlemagne.
- Al-Andalus: Saragossa rises against the Emirate of Córdoba. Emir Al-Hakam I sends a Muslim army under General Amrus ibn Yusuf, and retakes the city.
- Krum becomes ruler (khan) of the Bulgarian Empire (until 814). During his reign Bulgarian territory doubles in size, from the Danube to the Dniester.

====== Britain ======
- King Beorhtric of Wessex dies after drinking a chalice of poison intended for his wife, Eadburh. She flees to the court of Charlemagne, who accepts a portion of her wealth and makes her abbess. Prince Egbert returns to Wessex, and is accepted as the new king.
- Battle of Kempsford: Æthelmund, ealdorman of Hwicce, is killed during the battle by his rival Weohstan, who levies West Saxon Wiltshire.
- The Vikings plunder the treasures of Iona Abbey, on the west coast of Scotland (approximate date).

====== Abbasid Caliphate ======
- The Mecca Protocol: Caliph Harun al-Rashid and the leading officials of the Abbasid Caliphate perform the hajj to Mecca, where the line of succession is finalized. Harun's eldest son al-Amin is named heir, but his second son al-Ma'mun is named as al-Amin's heir, and ruler of a broadly autonomous Khurasan. A third son, al-Qasim, is added as third heir, and receives responsibility over the frontier areas with the Byzantine Empire.

====== Asia ======
- Prince Jayavarman declares the Khmer Empire (modern-day Cambodia) independent, and establishes the kingdom of Angkor. He is reconsecrated as a world ruler (chakravartin), or god-king (devaraja), under Hindu rites.

==== By topic ====
====== Religion ======
- The Haeinsa Temple of the Jogye Order is built in Korea.

=== 803 ===
==== By place ====
====== Byzantine Empire ======
- Emperors Nikephoros I and Charlemagne settle their imperial boundaries in the Adriatic Sea, and sign the Pax Nicephori ("Peace of Nikephoros"). The Byzantines retain control of the coastal cities and islands in Dalmatian Croatia, while Frankish rule is accepted over Istria and the Dalmatian hinterland. Venice is recognized as independent by the Byzantine Empire.
- Summer – Bardanes Tourkos, Byzantine general (strategos), is proclaimed emperor by the troops of the Anatolic, Opsikion, Thracian and Bucellarian themes. The 'rebel' army marches to Chrysopolis, a suburb of Constantinople. After the defection of two of his trusted aides, future emperors Leo the Armenian and Michael the Amorian, Bardanes negotiates peace.

====== Europe ======
- May – Krum, ruler (khan) of the Bulgarian Empire, begins his territorial expansion and raids the Byzantine northern frontier. He leads his warriors — mostly Bulgars, Slavs, Thracians and Macedonians — across the Carpathian Mountains, over the Danube River, and throughout Transylvania, Thrace, and Macedonia.
- St. Peter Stiftskulinarium, possibly Central Europe's oldest restaurant, is founded in Salzburg, Austria.

====== Abbasid Caliphate ======
- Caliph Harun al-Rashid has his friend and vizier (secretary) Ja'far ibn Yahya beheaded, The surviving members of the influential Barmakid family (Jafar's family) are imprisoned on the orders of Harun, and their property is confiscated.
- Marriage of caliph Harun al-Rashid and Umm Muhammad; She was the daughter of Abbasid prince Salih al-Miskin and Umm Abdullah, the daughter of Isa ibn Ali. They married in November–December 803 in Al-Raqqah. She had formerly been married to Ibrahim ibn al-Mahdi, who had repudiated her.
- The 803 Mopsuestia earthquake takes place in the vicinity of Mopsuestia, and the Gulf of Alexandretta (İskenderun)

==== By topic ====
====== Religion ======
- October 12 – The Synod of Clofesho (possibly Brixworth) is held, at which the Archbishopric of Lichfield is demoted to an ordinary bishopric, with papal permission obtained by King Coenwulf of Mercia.

=== 804 ===
==== By place ====
====== Abbasid Caliphate ======
- Battle of Krasos: Emperor Nikephoros I refuses to pay the tribute imposed by Caliph Harun al-Rashid of the Abbasid Caliphate. A Muslim-Arab expeditionary force invades Asia Minor. During a surprise attack, Nikephoros suffers a major defeat against the Saracens at Krasos in Phrygia. According to Arabian sources, the Byzantines lose 40,700 men and 4,000 pack animals, while Nikephoros himself is almost killed, but saved by the bravery of his officers.
- Abbasid caliph Harun al-Rashid marries Abbasa, the daughter of Abbasid prince and official Sulayman.

====== Europe ======
- Summer – Emperor Charlemagne finishes the conquest of Saxony. The Carolingian administration in the north is restored and the diocese of Bremen is re-established. Venice, torn by infighting, switches allegiance from Constantinople to King Pepin of Italy, son of Charlemagne.
- Obelerio degli Antenori becomes the ninth doge of Venice, after his predecessor Giovanni Galbaio flees to Mantua, where he is killed.
- The Gymnasium Carolinum in Osnabrück is founded by Charlemagne (the oldest school in Germany).

====== Asia ======
- Kūkai, Japanese Buddhist monk, travels in a government-sponsored expedition to China, in order to learn more about the Mahavairocana Sutra. He brings back texts of Shingon (Esoteric Buddhism).
- Priest Saichō, patriarch of Tendai Buddhism, visits China and reportedly brings back tea seeds (or 805).
- The Inscription of Sukabumi from Eastern Java marks the beginning of the Javanese language.

==== By topic ====
====== Religion ======
- Ludger, Frisian missionary, becomes the first bishop of Münster, and builds a monastery there.

=== 805 ===
==== By place ====
====== Byzantine Empire ======
- Siege of Patras: Local Slavic tribes of the Peloponnese lay siege to the city of Patras (modern Greece), with aid from an Arab fleet. A Byzantine relief army under Skleros, military governor (strategos) from Corinth, is sent and retakes the city. The captured Slavs in Patras are made slaves, and a church is dedicated to St. Andrew.

====== Europe ======
- Battle of Canburg: The Franks under Charles the Younger, son of emperor Charlemagne, defeat the Slavs near the modern-day town of Kadaň, and conquer Bohemia (modern Czech Republic).
- Krum, ruler (khan) of the Bulgarian Empire, conquers and destroys the Eastern part of the Avar Khaganate (approximate date).
- The first known mention of Magdeburg (Saxony-Anhalt), founded by Charlemagne, is made.

====== Asia ======
- February 25 – Emperor Dezong of Tang dies after a 25-year reign, in which the fanzhen is controlled by military governors or jiedushi, who often ignore imperial decrees. He is succeeded by his son Shunzong, who becomes ruler of the Tang Dynasty.
- August 31 – Shunzong issues an edict to yield the throne to his son Xianzong (Li Chun), because of an illness, taking for himself the title of "Retired Emperor" (Taishang Huang). Xian is confronted with political disputes in Zi Prefecture (Shaanxi).
- Priest Saichō, patriarch of Tendai Buddhism, visits China and introduces tea to Japan on his return (or 804).

==== By topic ====
====== Religion ======
- The Palatine Chapel in Aachen (modern Germany) is consecrated by Pope Leo III.

=== 806 ===
==== By place ====
====== Asia ======
- February 5 – Emperor Kanmu dies after a 25-year reign, that has seen Korean culture and technology introduced to Japan. He is succeeded by his son Heizei, as the 51st emperor of Japan.
- Hōzen-ji Temple is founded in Wakakusa, Nakakoma District, Japan (now Minami-Alps, Yamanashi Prefecture). The temple follows the Shingon sect of Japanese Buddhism.

====== Abbasid Caliphate ======
- Arab–Byzantine wars: Caliph Harun al-Rashid leads a huge military expedition, assembling men from Syria, Palestine, Persia, and Egypt. The invasion army (reportedly 135,000 men) departs from Raqqa, residence of Harun, and enters Cappadocia through the Cilician Gates, sacking several Byzantine fortresses and cities. Heraclea is captured after a month-long siege (August/September). The city is plundered and razed; its inhabitants are enslaved and deported to the Abbasid Caliphate.

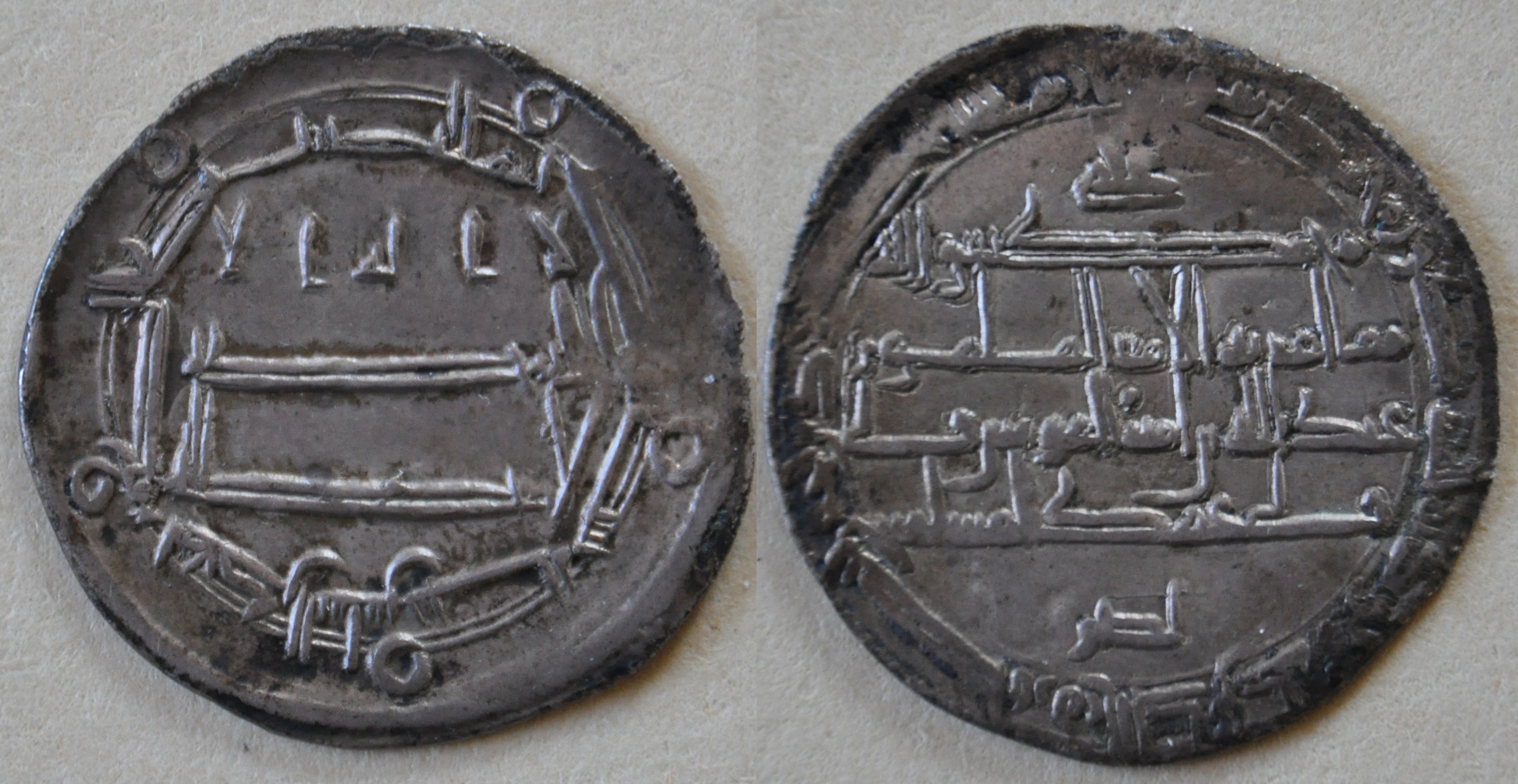
Dirham of Abbasid caliph Harun al-Rashid minted in Tashkent (Mad'an al-Shash) in 190 AH (805/806 CE)

- Arab–Byzantine wars: An Abbasid fleet under Humayd ibn Ma'yuf al-Hajuri raids Cyprus, carrying off 16,000 inhabitants as slaves.
- Harun al-Rashid appoints Ashot Msaker ("the Carnivorous") as the new presiding prince of Armenia. The Bagratids emerge as one of the country's two most powerful noble families. Harun recognizes another Bagratid branch, under Ashot I Curopalates, as princes of Caucasian Iberia.
- Rafi ibn al-Layth, an Arab nobleman, leads a large-scale rebellion against oppressive taxation by the Abbasid governor Ali ibn Isa ibn Mahan. He launches a revolt in Samarkand, which spreads quickly across Khorasan.

====== Britain ======
- Vikings massacre Columba's monks, and all the inhabitants on the island of Iona (Scotland). Other monks flee to safety in the monastery of Kells (Ireland). They take with them the Book of Kells.
- King Eardwulf of Northumbria is expelled from his kingdom by his rival Ælfwald II, who takes the throne. Eardwulf flees to the Frankish court of Charlemagne, and later visits Pope Leo III in Rome.

====== Europe ======
- November – Al-Hakam I, Umayyad emir of Córdoba, reasserts his control over the city of Toledo, autonomous since 797. To this effect Al-Hakam has over 72 nobles (accounts talk of 5,000) massacred at a banquet, crucified and displayed along the banks of the Guadalquivir River (modern Spain), in what comes to be known as the "Day of the Trench".
- Emperor Charlemagne divides the Frankish Empire under his three sons, called Divisio Regnorum. For Charles the Younger he designates the imperial title, Austrasia and Neustria, Saxony, Burgundy, and Thuringia. To Pepin he gives Italy, Bavaria, and Swabia. His youngest son Louis the Pious receives Aquitaine, the Spanish March, and Provence.
- Grimoald III, Lombard duke of Benevento, dies without heirs. He is succeeded by Grimoald IV, who is forced to pay tribute to King Charles the Younger.

==== By topic ====
====== Religion ======
- April 12 – Nikephoros I is elected patriarch of Constantinople, succeeding Tarasios.
- The church (oratory) in Germigny-des-Prés is built by Bishop Theodulf of Orléans.
- July 26 – Wulfred is elected Archbishop of Canterbury.

=== 807 ===
==== By place ====
====== Abbasid Empire and Byzantine Empire ======
- Emperor Nikephoros I is forced to sue for peace, on condition of paying 50,000 nomismata to Caliph Harun al-Rashid, and agrees to a yearly tribute. Nikephoros promises not to rebuild the dismantled forts. Rashid recalls his forces from various sieges, and evacuates Byzantine territory.

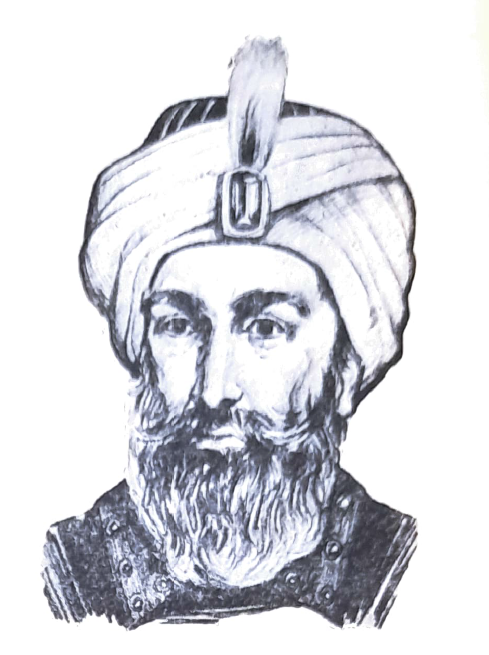
Harun al-Rashid (r. 786–809) the Commander-in-chief and caliph of the Abbasid Caliphate. He was the Arab leader of the Caliphate–Byzantine wars in the late 8th and early 9th century.

- An Abbasid fleet under Humayd ibn Ma'yuf al-Hajuri raids the Peloponnese, Rhodes and Myra.

====== Europe ======
- Al-Andalus (modern Spain): An uprising occurs in the city of Mérida against the Umayyad Emirate of Córdoba.
- Siege of Patras: This marks the end of independent rule by the South Slavs in the Peloponnese (or 805).

====== Britain ======
- The Vikings land on the Cornish coast, and form an alliance with the Cornish to fight against Wessex.

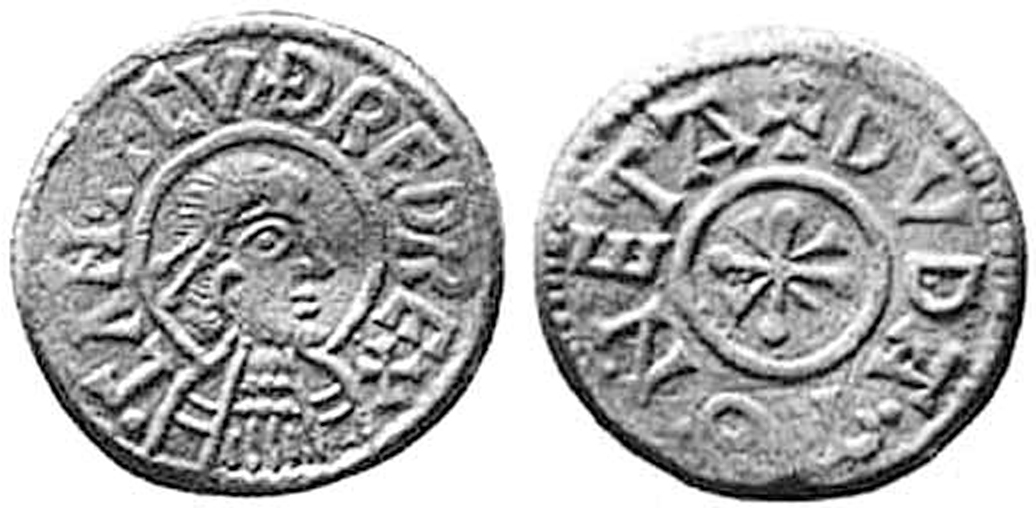
Coin of king Cuthred of Kent (798–807)

- King Cuthred of Kent dies. His brother, King Coenwulf of Mercia, takes control over Kent himself.

====== Asia ======
- Dappula II becomes king of Sri Lanka, and makes Anuradhapura the capital city.
- Li Jifu is appointed chancellor, during the reign of Emperor Xian Zong in China.

==== By topic ====
====== Religion ======
- The Temple of Motoyama-ji in Mitoyo (Japan), of the Kōyasan Shingon-shū sect, is constructed by the orders of Emperor Heizei.
- The Jame' Atiq Mosque of Qazvin is constructed in Qazvin (modern Iran), by the orders of Harun al-Rashid.
- The Book of Armagh is written by the Irish illuminator Ferdomnach, a scribe at the School of Armagh.

====== Science ======
- The first record of sun spots appears in Europe.

=== 808 ===
==== By place ====
====== Europe ======
- King Godfred of the Danes forms an alliance with the Wiltzi and other Wendic tribes, against the pagan but pro-Frankish Abodrites. Godfred builds earthworks (Danevirke) across the isthmus of Schleswig-Holstein, separating Jutland from the northern extent of the Frankish Empire.
- Viking Age: First Viking raid, by Danes against the Baltic coast. Godfred destroys the Slav settlement of Reric (near present-day Wismar), used as a strategic trade route. The population is displaced or abducted, to Hedeby (Denmark).
- Emperor Charlemagne gives orders to construct two new forts on the Elbe River, garrisoning them against future Slav incursions.
- In Gharb al-Andalus (modern Portugal), Hazim ibn Wahb leads a rebellion against the Emirate of Córdoba.

====== Britain ======
- Exiled king Eardwulf of Northumbria is able to return to his kingdom, with the support of Charlemagne and Pope Leo III. He ousts the usurper, King Ælfwald II.
- Cadell ap Brochfael, king of Powys (modern Wales), dies after a 35-year reign, and is succeeded by his son Cyngen ap Cadell.

==== By topic ====
====== Finance ======
- Jewish merchants in Lombardy open the first bank (or money repository) in Italy (approximate date).

=== 809 ===
==== By place ====
====== Byzantine Empire ======
- Spring – Siege of Serdica: Krum, ruler (khan) of the Bulgarian Empire, captures the fortress of Serdica (modern Sofia), after a long siege. According to Byzantine sources, he massacres the garrison (supposedly 6,000 men), sacks the city, and razes the city walls, before returning with much loot to Bulgaria. In the following years (and centuries), Serdica will serve as a base for the expansion of the Bulgars to the south of the Balkans.

====== Europe ======
- A Byzantine fleet lands in the Venetian Lagoon, and attacks a Frankish flotilla at Comacchio, but is defeated. Doge Obelerio degli Antenori marries a Frankish bride, Carola; she becomes the first dogaressa of Venice.
- Aznar Galíndez I succeeds Aureolus, as count of Aragon (modern Spain). He is installed by King Louis the Pious (a son of emperor Charlemagne), and remains a Frankish vassal.
- A rebellion in Gharb al-Andalus (modern Portugal) is crushed by the Emirate of Córdoba.

====== Abbasid Caliphate ======
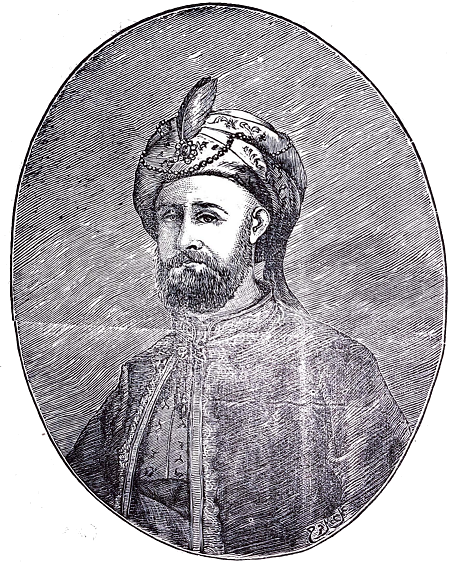
Caliph Harun al-Rashid of the Abbasid dynasty

- March 24 – Caliph Harun al-Rashid dies at Tus, on an expedition to put down an uprising in Khorasan (modern Iran). He is succeeded by his son Muhammad ibn Harun al-Amin.

====== Asia ======
- Emperor Heizei becomes ill, and abdicates the throne in favor of his brother Saga, who is installed as the 52nd emperor of Japan.
- Emperor Govinda III defeats his rival Nagabhata II, and obtains the submission of the Pala Empire (India).

==== By topic ====
====== Religion ======
- Council of Aachen (809): Frankish bishops adopt the filioque addition in the Creed. Pope Leo III intervenes, and refuses to recognize it as valid.

== Significant people ==
- Al-Amin
- Charlemagne
- Haroun al-Raschid
- Jayavarman II
- Nicephorus I
- Krum
- Du Mu

== Births ==
800

- Aldric, bishop of Le Mans (approximate date)
- Al-Abbās ibn Said al-Jawharī, Muslim mathematician
- Álvaro of Córdoba, Mozarab scholar (approximate date)
- Amoghavarsha I, king of Rashtrakuta (India) (d. 878)
- Boso the Elder, Frankish nobleman (approximate date)
- Fatima al-Fihri, Arab mosque founder (approximate date)
- Govindasvāmi, Indian astronomer (approximate date)
- Louis, Frankish abbot (approximate date)
- Methodios I, patriarch of Constantinople (or 788)
- Nicholas I, pope of the Catholic Church (d. 867)
- Nominoe, duke of Brittany (approximate date)
- Pribina, Slavic prince (approximate date)
- Robert III, Frankish nobleman (d. 834)
- Rorgon II, count of Maine (approximate date)
- Swithin, bishop of Winchester (approximate date)
- Valentine, pope of the Catholic Church (d. 827)

801

- September 8 – Ansgar, Frankish monk and archbishop (d. 865)
- June 17 – Drogo of Metz, illegitimate son of Charlemagne
- Al-Kindi, Muslim philosopher and polymath (approximate date)
- Waldrada of Worms, Frankish Duchess, married to Conrad II
- Wang Chengyuan, general of the Tang Dynasty (d. 834)

802

- Bi Xian, chancellor of the Tang Dynasty (d. 864)
- Fujiwara no Nagara, Japanese statesman (d. 856)
- Hugh, illegitimate son of Charlemagne (d. 844)
- Ono no Takamura, Japanese scholar and poet (d. 853)
- Ralpacan, emperor of Tibet (d. 836)

803

- Du Mu, Chinese poet and official (d. 852)
- Emma of Altdorf, Frankish queen and wife of King Louis the German of East Francia (died 876)
- Ibn 'Abd al-Hakam, Muslim historian (d. 871)
- Liu Congjian, Chinese governor (d. 843)

804

- Bayazid Bastami, Persian Sufi (d. 874)
- Fujiwara no Yoshifusa, Japanese regent (d. 872)

805

- García Íñiguez I, king of Pamplona (approximate date)
- Louis the German, grandson of Charlemagne and first East frankish king. (Approximate date) (d. 876)
- Liudolf, duke of Saxony (approximate date)
- Lupus Servatus, Frankish abbot (approximate date)

806

- Hincmar, archbishop of Reims (d. 882)
- Leuthard II, Frankish count (approximate date)
- Ralpacan, king of Tibet (approximate date)

807

- Dongshan Liangjie, Chinese Buddhist teacher (d. 869)

808

- September 27 – Ninmyō, emperor of Japan (d. 850)
- Emma of Altdorf, Frankish queen (or 803)
- Gottschalk of Orbais, German monk and theologian (approximate date)
- Kang Chengxun, general of the Tang Dynasty (approximate date)
- Kim Yang, viceroy of Silla (Korea) (d. 857)
- Walafrid Strabo, Frankish theological writer (approximate date)

809

- Hunayn ibn Ishaq, Muslim scholar and physician (d. 873)
- Jing Zong, emperor of the Tang Dynasty (d. 827)
- Wen Zong, emperor of the Tang Dynasty (d. 840)

== Deaths ==
800

- June 3 – Staurakios, Byzantine chief minister
- September 26 – Berowulf, bishop of Würzburg
- Ailill mac Fergusa, king of South Brega (Ireland)
- Alkelda, Anglo-Saxon princess (approximate date)
- Beatus of Liébana, monk and theologian (approximate date)
- Ealhmund, prince of Northumbria (approximate date)
- Luitgard, Frankish queen and wife of Charlemagne
- Vatsraja, king of the Gurjara-Pratihara Dynasty

801

- Heathoberht, Bishop of London
- Rabia Basri, Muslim Sufi mystic and saint (b. 717)

802

- January 11 – Paulinus II, patriarch of Aquileia (or 804)
- Æthelmund, Anglo-Saxon nobleman
- Bahlul ibn Marzuq, Muslim general
- Beorhtric, king of Wessex
- Domitian, duke of Carantania (approximate date)
- Eadburh, Anglo-Saxon princess
- Kardam, ruler (khan) of the Bulgarian Empire (or 803)
- Rashid, Muslim regent of Idris II
- Višeslav, duke of Croatia (or 810)
- Wulfstan, Anglo-Saxon ealdorman
- Theoctista, politically influential Byzantine woman (b. 740)

803

- May 25 – Higbald, bishop of Lindisfarne
- August 9 – Irene of Athens, Byzantine empress
- Ja'far ibn Yahya, Persian vizier (b. 767)
- Kardam, ruler (khan) of Bulgaria (or 802)

804

- May 19 – Alcuin, bishop and advisor to Charlemagne
- October 1 – Richbod, archbishop of Trier
- Saint Abundantia, Christian saint
- Giovanni Galbaio, doge of Venice (approximate date)
- Ibrahim al-Mawsili, musician and singer (b. 742)
- Lu Yu, Chinese author of The Classic of Tea (b. 733)
- Ragnar Lothbrok Legendary Norse Viking hero and Scandinavian King.

805

- February 25 – De Zong, emperor of the Tang Dynasty (b. 742)
- May 12 – Æthelhard, archbishop of Canterbury
- Anselm, duke of Friuli (approximate date)
- Cernach mac Fergusa, king of South Brega (Ireland)
- Urbicius, Frankish monk (approximate date)
- Hui-kuo, Chinese Buddhist monk (b. 746)
- Jia Dan, general of the Tang Dynasty (b. 730)
- Muhammad al-Shaybani, Muslim jurist
- Wei Gao, general of the Tang Dynasty (b. 745)

806

- February 5 – Kanmu, emperor of Japan (b. 737)
- February 11 – Shun Zong, emperor of the Tang Dynasty (b. 761)
- February 25 – Tarasios, patriarch of Constantinople
- July 19 – Li Shigu, general of the Tang Dynasty (b. 778)
- Grimoald III, Lombard prince of Benevento
- Miliduch, prince (knyaz) of the Sorbs (approximate date)
- Muhammad ibn Ibrahim al-Fazari, Muslim philosopher (or 796)
- Yahya ibn Khalid, Persian vizier of Bagdad

807

- October 13 – Simpert, bishop of Augsburg
- Conall mac Taidg, king of the Picts (approximate date)
- Cuthred, king of Kent
- Robert II, Frankish nobleman (approximate date)
- Stephen the Hymnographer, Syrian monk (b. 725)
- Widukind, duke of Saxony (approximate date)

808

- Ælfwald II, king of Northumbria (approximate date)
- Al-Fadl ibn Yahya al-Barmaki, Muslim governor (b. 766)
- Cadell ap Brochfael, king of Powys (Wales)
- Du Huangchang, chancellor of the Tang Dynasty
- Eanbald II, archbishop of York
- Elipando, Spanish archbishop and theologian (approximate date)
- Layman Pang, Chinese (Zen) Buddhist (b. 740)

809

- March 24 – Harun al-Rashid, Muslim caliph (b. 763)
- March 26 – Ludger, Frisian missionary
- July 14 – Ōtomo no Otomaro, Japanese general and Shōgun (b. 731)
- Abbas ibn al-Ahnaf, Muslim poet (b. 750)
- Aejang, king of Silla (b. 788)
- Aureolus of Aragon, Frankish nobleman
- Cellach Tosach mac Donngaile, Irish king
- Elfodd, Welsh bishop (approximate date)
- Gang, king of Balhae (Korea)
- Wang Shizhen, Chinese general (b. 759)
