= 802 =

Calendar year

802 in various calendars
Gregorian calendar	802; DCCCII
Ab urbe condita	1555
Armenian calendar	251; ԹՎ ՄԾԱ
Assyrian calendar	5552
Balinese saka calendar	723–724
Bengali calendar	208–209
Berber calendar	1752
Buddhist calendar	1346
Burmese calendar	164
Byzantine calendar	6310–6311
Chinese calendar	辛巳年 (Metal Snake); 3499 or 3292 — to — 壬午年 (Water Horse); 3500 or 3293
Coptic calendar	518–519
Discordian calendar	1968
Ethiopian calendar	794–795
Hebrew calendar	4562–4563
- Hindu calendars
Vikram Samvat	858–859
Shaka Samvat	723–724
Kali Yuga	3902–3903
Holocene calendar	10802
Iranian calendar	180–181
Islamic calendar	185–187
Japanese calendar	Enryaku 21 (延暦２１年)
Javanese calendar	697–698
Julian calendar	802; DCCCII
Korean calendar	3135
Minguo calendar	1110 before ROC 民前1110年
Nanakshahi calendar	−666
Seleucid era	1113/1114 AG
Thai solar calendar	1344–1345
Tibetan calendar	ལྕགས་མོ་སྦྲུལ་ལོ་ (female Iron-Snake); 928 or 547 or −225 — to — ཆུ་ཕོ་རྟ་ལོ་ (male Water-Horse); 929 or 548 or −224

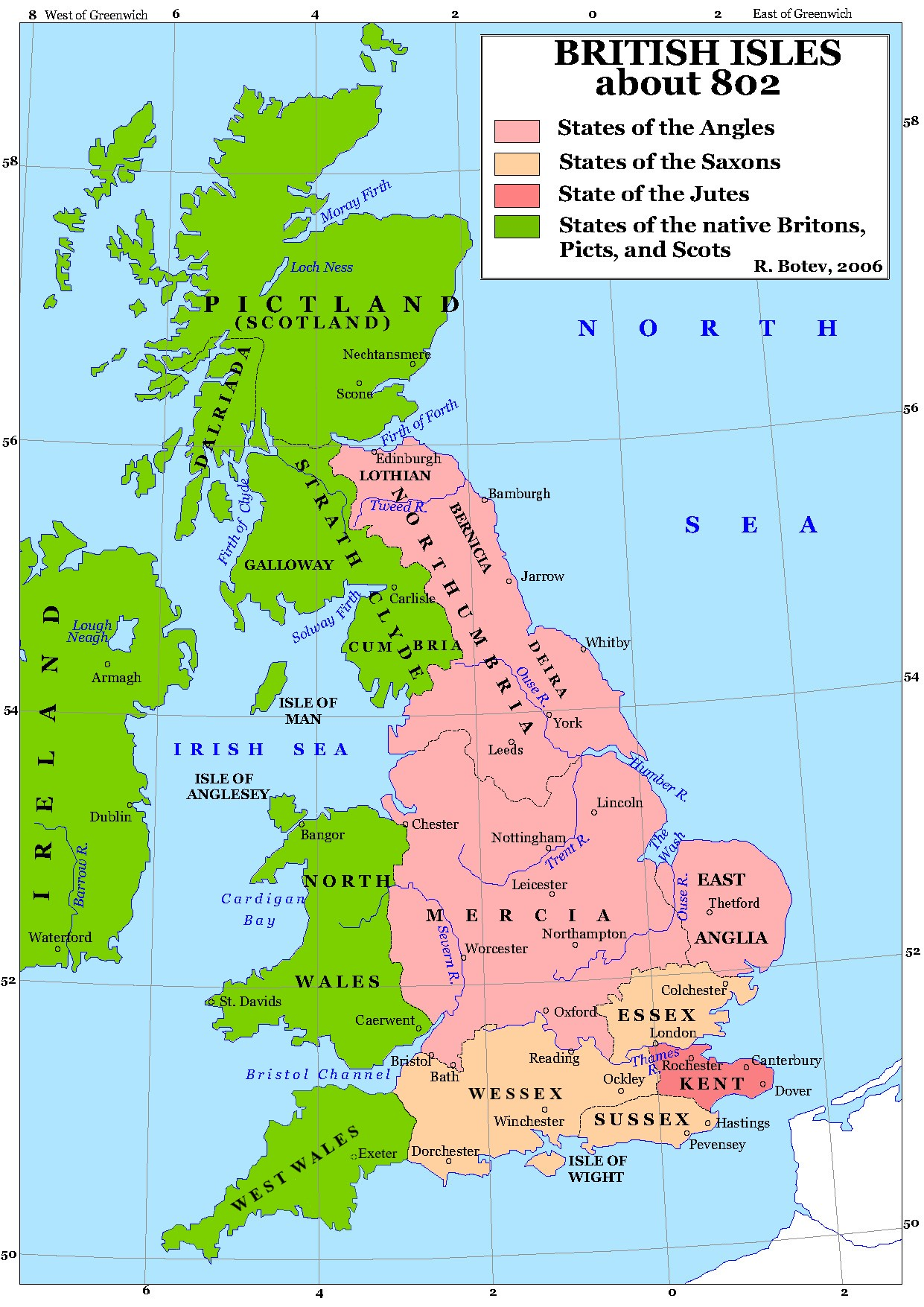
Map of the British Isles (c. 802)

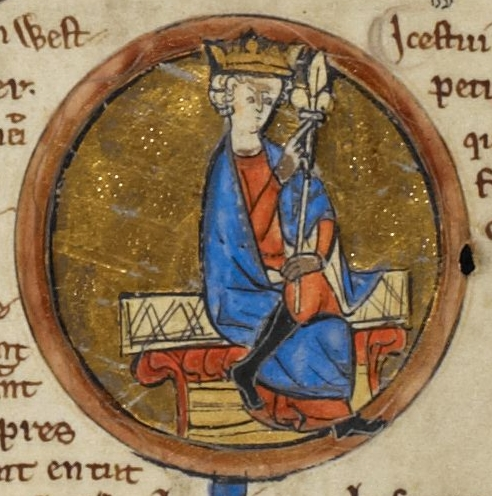
King Egbert of Wessex (802–839)

Year 802 (DCCCII) was a common year starting on Saturday of the Julian calendar, the 802nd year of the Common Era (CE) and Anno Domini (AD) designations, the 802nd year of the 1st millennium, the 2nd year of the 9th century, and the 3rd year of the 800s decade.

== Events ==
=== By place ===
==== Byzantine Empire ====
- October 31 – Empress Irene is deposed after a 5-year reign, and banished to Lesbos. High-ranking patricians place Nikephoros, the minister of finance (logothetes tou genikou), on the throne. He is crowned in the Hagia Sophia at Constantinople, by Patriarch Tarasios, as emperor of the Byzantine Empire.

==== Central America ====
- May 1 – Lachan Kʼawiil Ajaw Bot (born June 25, 760) becomes the ruler of the Mayan city state near Itzan in Guatemala.

==== Europe ====
- Pagan Danes invade Obodrite-ruled Schleswig, to take over territory almost emptied by the forcible deportations of the Saxons by emperor Charlemagne.
- Al-Andalus: Saragossa rises against the Emirate of Córdoba. Emir Al-Hakam I sends a Muslim army under General Amrus ibn Yusuf, and retakes the city.
- Krum becomes ruler (khan) of the Bulgarian Empire (until 814). During his reign Bulgarian territory doubles in size, from the Danube to the Dniester.

==== Britain ====
- King Beorhtric of Wessex dies after drinking a chalice of poison intended for his wife, Eadburh. She flees to the court of Charlemagne, who accepts a portion of her wealth and makes her abbess. Prince Egbert returns to Wessex, and is accepted as the new king.
- Battle of Kempsford: Æthelmund, ealdorman of Hwicce, is killed during the battle by his rival Weohstan, who levies West Saxon Wiltshire.
- The Vikings plunder the treasures of Iona Abbey, on the west coast of Scotland (approximate date).

==== Abbasid Caliphate ====
- The Mecca Protocol: Caliph Harun al-Rashid and the leading officials of the Abbasid Caliphate perform the hajj to Mecca, where the line of succession is finalized. Harun's eldest son al-Amin is named heir, but his second son al-Ma'mun is named as al-Amin's heir, and ruler of a broadly autonomous Khurasan. A third son, al-Qasim, is added as third heir, and receives responsibility over the frontier areas with the Byzantine Empire.

==== Asia ====
- Prince Jayavarman declares the Khmer Empire (modern-day Cambodia) independent, and establishes the kingdom of Angkor. He is reconsecrated as a world ruler (chakravartin), or god-king (devaraja), under Hindu rites.

=== By topic ===
==== Religion ====
- The Haeinsa Temple of the Jogye Order is built in Korea.

== Births ==
- Bi Xian, chancellor of the Tang Dynasty (d. 864)
- Fujiwara no Nagara, Japanese statesman (d. 856)
- Hugh, illegitimate son of Charlemagne (d. 844)
- Ono no Takamura, Japanese scholar and poet (d. 853)
- Ralpacan, emperor of Tibet (d. 836)

== Deaths ==
- January 11 – Paulinus II, patriarch of Aquileia (or 804)
- Æthelmund, Anglo-Saxon nobleman
- Bahlul ibn Marzuq, Muslim general
- Beorhtric, king of Wessex
- Domitian, duke of Carantania (approximate date)
- Eadburh, Anglo-Saxon princess
- Kardam, ruler (khan) of the Bulgarian Empire (or 803)
- Rashid, Muslim regent of Idris II
- Višeslav, duke of Croatia (or 810)
- Wulfstan, Anglo-Saxon ealdorman
- Theoctista, politically influential Byzantine woman (b. 740)
