= 803 =

Calendar year

803 in various calendars
- Gregorian calendar: 803; DCCCIII
- Ab urbe condita: 1556
- Armenian calendar: 252; ԹՎ ՄԾԲ
- Assyrian calendar: 5553
- Balinese saka calendar: 724–725
- Bengali calendar: 209–210
- Berber calendar: 1753
- Buddhist calendar: 1347
- Burmese calendar: 165
- Byzantine calendar: 6311–6312
- Chinese calendar: 壬午年 (Water Horse); 3500 or 3293 — to — 癸未年 (Water Goat); 3501 or 3294
- Coptic calendar: 519–520
- Discordian calendar: 1969
- Ethiopian calendar: 795–796
- Hebrew calendar: 4563–4564
- Hindu calendars
- Vikram Samvat: 859–860
- Shaka Samvat: 724–725
- Kali Yuga: 3903–3904
- Holocene calendar: 10803
- Iranian calendar: 181–182
- Islamic calendar: 187–188
- Japanese calendar: Enryaku 22 (延暦２２年)
- Javanese calendar: 698–699
- Julian calendar: 803; DCCCIII
- Korean calendar: 3136
- Minguo calendar: 1109 before ROC 民前1109年
- Nanakshahi calendar: −665
- Seleucid era: 1114/1115 AG
- Thai solar calendar: 1345–1346
- Tibetan calendar: ཆུ་ཕོ་རྟ་ལོ་ (male Water-Horse); 929 or 548 or −224 — to — ཆུ་མོ་ལུག་ལོ་ (female Water-Sheep); 930 or 549 or −223

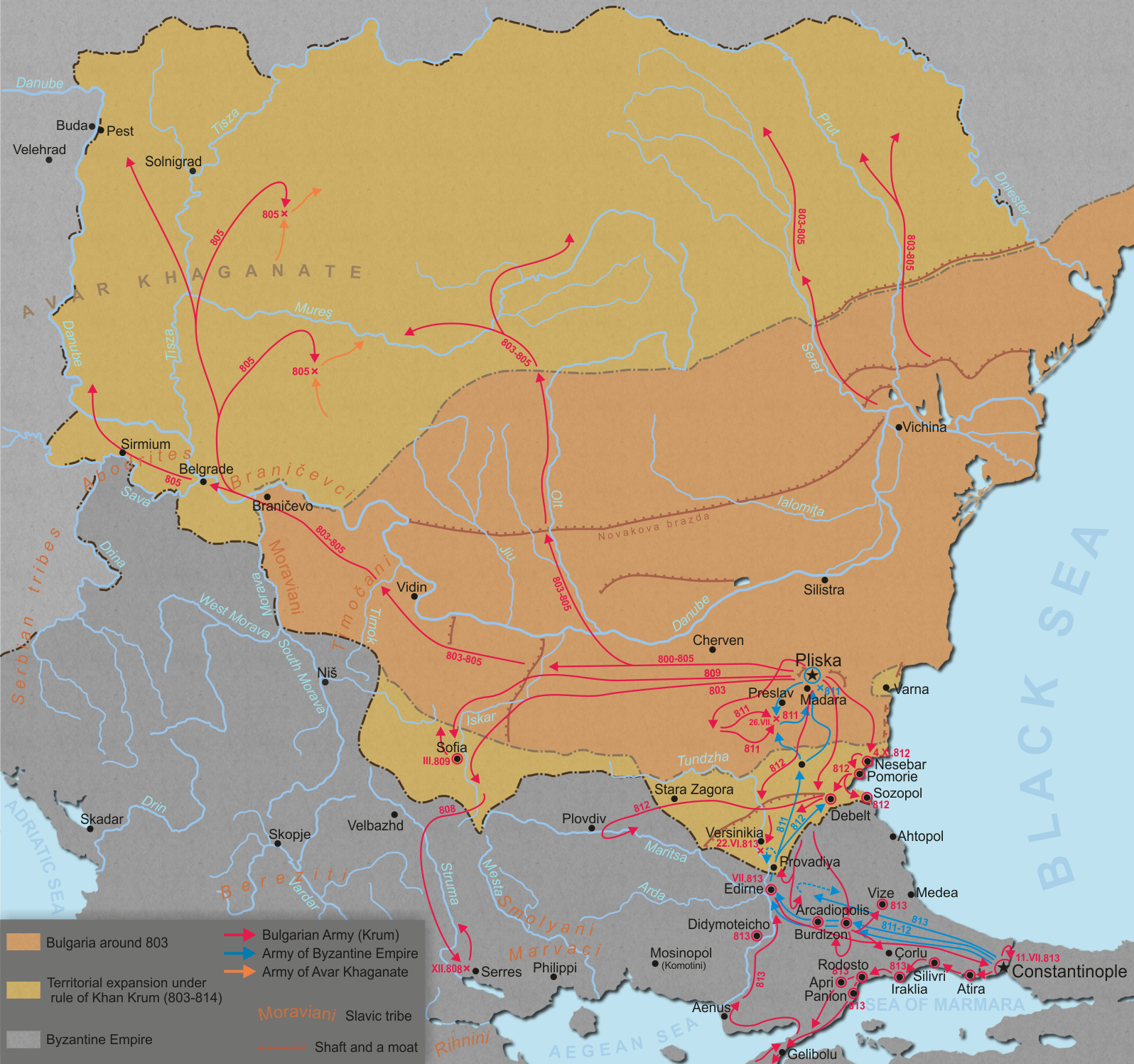
Territorial expansion of Krum (803–814)

Year 803 (DCCCIII) was a common year starting on Sunday of the Julian calendar.

== Events ==
=== By place ===
==== Byzantine Empire ====
- Emperors Nikephoros I and Charlemagne settle their imperial boundaries in the Adriatic Sea, and sign the Pax Nicephori ("Peace of Nikephoros"). The Byzantines retain control of the coastal cities and islands in Dalmatian Croatia, while Frankish rule is accepted over Istria and the Dalmatian hinterland. Venice is recognized as independent by the Byzantine Empire.
- Summer – Bardanes Tourkos, Byzantine general (strategos), is proclaimed emperor by the troops of the Anatolic, Opsikion, Thracian and Bucellarian themes. The 'rebel' army marches to Chrysopolis, a suburb of Constantinople. After the defection of two of his trusted aides, future emperors Leo the Armenian and Michael the Amorian, Bardanes negotiates peace.

==== Europe ====
- May – Krum, ruler (khan) of the Bulgarian Empire, begins his territorial expansion and raids the Byzantine northern frontier. He leads his warriors — mostly Bulgars, Slavs, Thracians and Macedonians — across the Carpathian Mountains, over the Danube River, and throughout Transylvania, Thrace, and Macedonia.
- St. Peter Stiftskulinarium, possibly Central Europe's oldest restaurant, is founded in Salzburg, Austria.

==== Abbasid Caliphate ====
- Caliph Harun al-Rashid has his friend and vizier (secretary) Ja'far ibn Yahya beheaded, The surviving members of the influential Barmakid family (Jafar's family) are imprisoned on the orders of Harun, and their property is confiscated.
- November - December: Caliph Harun al-Rashid marries Umm Muhammad, the daughter of Abbasid prince Salih al-Miskin and Umm Abdullah, the daughter of Isa ibn Ali, in Al-raqqah. She had formerly been married to Ibrahim ibn al-Mahdi, who had repudiated her.
- The 803 Mopsuestia earthquake takes place in the vicinity of Mopsuestia, and the Gulf of Alexandretta (İskenderun)

=== By topic ===
==== Religion ====
- October 12 – The Synod of Clofesho (possibly Brixworth) is held, at which the Archbishopric of Lichfield is demoted to an ordinary bishopric, with papal permission obtained by King Coenwulf of Mercia.

== Births ==
- Du Mu, Chinese poet and official (d. 852)
- Emma of Altdorf, Frankish queen and wife of King Louis the German of East Francia (died 876)
- Ibn 'Abd al-Hakam, Muslim historian (d. 871)
- Liu Congjian, Chinese governor (d. 843)

== Deaths ==
- May 25 – Higbald, bishop of Lindisfarne
- August 9 – Irene of Athens, Byzantine empress
- Ja'far ibn Yahya, Persian vizier (b. 767)
- Kardam, ruler (khan) of Bulgaria (or 802)

== Sources ==
- al-Tabari, Muhammad Ibn Yarir; Bosworth, Clifford Edmund (1989). The History of al-Tabari Vol. 30: The 'Abbasid Caliphate in Equilibrium: The Caliphates of Musa al-Hadi and Harun al-Rashid A.D. 785-809/A.H. 169-193. Bibliotheca Persica. State University of New York Press. ISBN 978-0-88706-564-4.
- Antonopoulos, J. (1980), Data from investigation of seismic Sea waves events in the Eastern Mediterranean from 500 to 1000 A.D., Annals of Geophysics
