= 800s =

800s may refer to:

- The period from 800 to 899, almost synonymous with the 9th century (801–900).
- The period from 800 to 809, known as the 800s decade, almost synonymous with the 81st decade (801-810).
