= Sanctuary of San Úrbez =

Former monastery in Nueno, Spain

Coordinates: 42°19′39″N 0°14′25″W

The Sanctuary of San Úrbez or the Hermitage of San Úrbez (Spanish: Santuario de San Úrbez or Ermita de San Úrbez) was a monastery in Nocito, in the municipality of Nueno in the Province of Huesca, Aragon, Spain. It was established in the 12th century on the site of the hermitage of the 9th-century Saint Urbicius (Aragonese: San Úrbez and Spanish: San Urbicio). The church housed his relics, which were almost entirely destroyed in the Spanish Civil War.
