= 844 =

Calendar year

844 in various calendars
Gregorian calendar	844; DCCCXLIV
Ab urbe condita	1597
Armenian calendar	293; ԹՎ ՄՂԳ
Assyrian calendar	5594
Balinese saka calendar	765–766
Bengali calendar	250–251
Berber calendar	1794
Buddhist calendar	1388
Burmese calendar	206
Byzantine calendar	6352–6353
Chinese calendar	癸亥年 (Water Pig); 3541 or 3334 — to — 甲子年 (Wood Rat); 3542 or 3335
Coptic calendar	560–561
Discordian calendar	2010
Ethiopian calendar	836–837
Hebrew calendar	4604–4605
- Hindu calendars
Vikram Samvat	900–901
Shaka Samvat	765–766
Kali Yuga	3944–3945
Holocene calendar	10844
Iranian calendar	222–223
Islamic calendar	229–230
Japanese calendar	Jōwa 11 (承和１１年)
Javanese calendar	741–742
Julian calendar	844; DCCCXLIV
Korean calendar	3177
Minguo calendar	1068 before ROC 民前1068年
Nanakshahi calendar	−624
Seleucid era	1155/1156 AG
Thai solar calendar	1386–1387
Tibetan calendar	ཆུ་མོ་ཕག་ལོ་ (female Water-Boar); 970 or 589 or −183 — to — ཤིང་ཕོ་བྱི་བ་ལོ་ (male Wood-Rat); 971 or 590 or −182

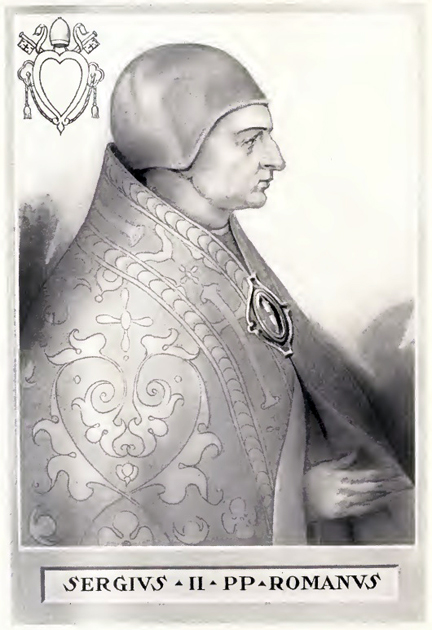
Pope Sergius II (844–847)

Year 844 (DCCCXLIV) was a leap year starting on Tuesday of the Julian calendar.

== Events ==
=== By place ===
==== Byzantine Empire ====
- Spring – Battle of Mauropotamos: A Byzantine expedition under Theoktistos is sent to Anatolia (modern Turkey), against the Muslim Arabs of the Abbasid Caliphate, who have raided the Byzantine themes of Cappadocia, Anatolikon, Boukellarion, and Opsikion. The Byzantines are defeated, and many of the officers defect to the Arabs.

==== Europe ====
- Viking raiders ascend the River Garonne as far as the city of Toulouse, and pillage the lands of Septimania. Part of the marauding Vikings invades Galicia (Northern Spain), where some perish in a storm at sea. After being defeated in Corunna, the Scandinavian raiders sack the Umayyad cities of Seville (see below), Niebla, Beja, and Lisbon.
- Summer – King Charles the Bald struggles against the repeated rebellions in Aquitaine, and against the Bretons in West Francia. He besieges Bernard I at the Battle of Toulouse, while Duke Nominoe raids into Maine, and plunders other Frankish territory.
- June 15 – Louis II, eldest son of Emperor Lothair I, is crowned king at Rome by Pope Sergius II, and becomes co-ruler of Middle Francia, and over Lombardy, Friuli, and Tuscany in Italy.
- September 25–November 11 or 17 – Viking raid on Seville (844): Vikings arrive in Seville by the Guadalquivir, taking the city on October 1 or 3 and pillaging it; but are expelled by forces of the Emirate of Córdoba.

==== Britain ====
- King Æthelred II of Northumbria is expelled from his kingdom by Rædwulf, who takes the throne. Rædwulf is later killed in battle against the Vikings, along with many of his noblemen. Æthelred returns and claims his right to rule.
- King Merfyn Frych dies after a 24-year reign. He is succeeded by his son Rhodri Mawr ("the Great"), who thus becomes ruler of Gwynedd (Wales).

=== By topic ===
==== Religion ====
- January 25 – Pope Gregory IV dies after a 16-year reign, in which he has supported the Frankish policy of late emperor Louis the Pious, and established the observance of All Saints' Day. He is succeeded by Sergius II, as the 102nd pope of Rome. Sergius imprisons the antipope John VIII, and is elected by popular acclamation.

== Births ==
- Abdullah ibn Muhammad al-Umawi, Muslim emir (d. 912)
- Al-Mu'tamid, Muslim caliph (d. 892)
- Hasan al-Utrush, Muslim emir (approximate date)
- Sosei, Japanese waka poet (approximate date)
- Yu Xuanji, Chinese poet (approximate date)

== Deaths ==
- January 11 – Michael I, former Byzantine emperor
- January 25 – Gregory IV, pope of the Catholic Church
- Abdallah ibn Tahir, Muslim governor (or 845)
- Abu Ja'far Ashinas, Muslim general
- Alberik II, Frankish bishop
- Bera, count of Barcelona
- Bernard II, count of Poitiers
- Bernard I, duke of Septimania
- Chen Yixing, chancellor of the Tang Dynasty
- Ekkehard, Frankish nobleman
- Galindo Garcés, count of Aragon
- Hugh, illegitimate son of Charlemagne (b. 802)
- Merfyn Frych, king of Gwynedd (Wales)
- Mukhariq, Abbasid court singer
- Nithard, Frankish historian
- Rædwulf, king of Northumbria (approximate date)
- Tachibana no Hayanari, Japanese calligrapher (d. 782)
- Theodrada, Frankrish princess and abbess (or 853)

== Sources ==
- Vasiliev, Alexander A. (1935). Byzance et les Arabes, Tome I: La dynastie d'Amorium (820–867). Corpus Bruxellense Historiae Byzantinae (in French). Vol. 1. French ed.: Henri Grégoire, Marius Canard. Brussels: Éditions de l'Institut de philologie et d'histoire orientales.
