= 792 =

Calendar year

792 in various calendars
- Gregorian calendar: 792; DCCXCII
- Ab urbe condita: 1545
- Armenian calendar: 241; ԹՎ ՄԽԱ
- Assyrian calendar: 5542
- Balinese saka calendar: 713–714
- Bengali calendar: 198–199
- Berber calendar: 1742
- Buddhist calendar: 1336
- Burmese calendar: 154
- Byzantine calendar: 6300–6301
- Chinese calendar: 辛未年 (Metal Goat); 3489 or 3282 — to — 壬申年 (Water Monkey); 3490 or 3283
- Coptic calendar: 508–509
- Discordian calendar: 1958
- Ethiopian calendar: 784–785
- Hebrew calendar: 4552–4553
- Hindu calendars
- Vikram Samvat: 848–849
- Shaka Samvat: 713–714
- Kali Yuga: 3892–3893
- Holocene calendar: 10792
- Iranian calendar: 170–171
- Islamic calendar: 175–176
- Japanese calendar: Enryaku 11 (延暦１１年)
- Javanese calendar: 687–688
- Julian calendar: 792; DCCXCII
- Korean calendar: 3125
- Minguo calendar: 1120 before ROC 民前1120年
- Nanakshahi calendar: −676
- Seleucid era: 1103/1104 AG
- Thai solar calendar: 1334–1335
- Tibetan calendar: ལྕགས་མོ་ལུག་ལོ་ (female Iron-Sheep); 918 or 537 or −235 — to — ཆུ་ཕོ་སྤྲེ་ལོ་ (male Water-Monkey); 919 or 538 or −234

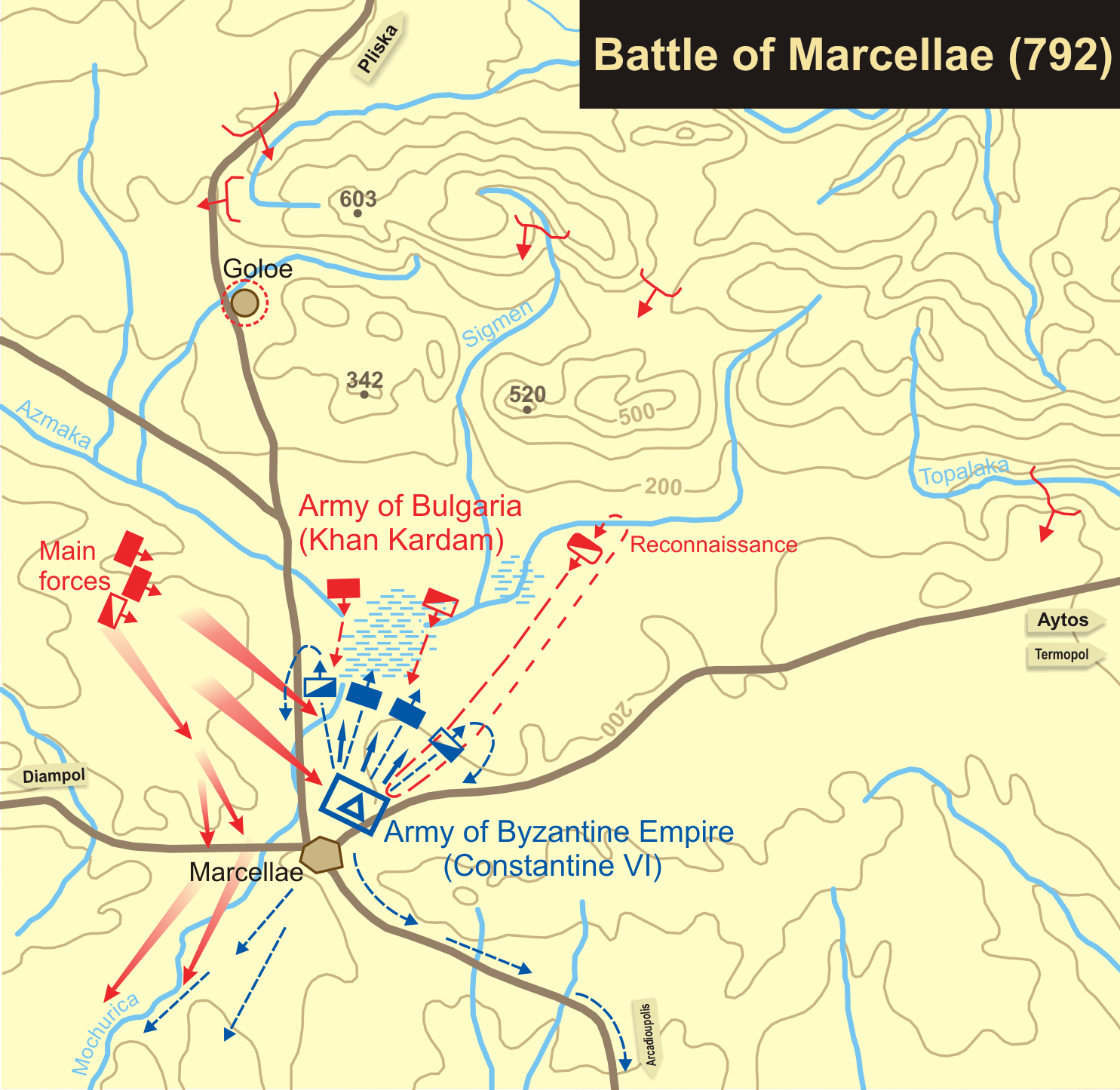
Map of the Battle of Marcellae (792)

Year 792 (DCCXCII) was a leap year starting on Sunday of the Julian calendar, the 792nd year of the Common Era (CE) and Anno Domini (AD) designations, the 792nd year of the 1st millennium, the 92nd year of the 8th century, and the 3rd year of the 790s decade. The denomination 792 for this year has been used since the early medieval period, when the Anno Domini calendar era became the prevalent method in Europe for naming years.

== Events ==
=== By place ===
==== Byzantine Empire ====
- Spring – Emperor Constantine VI suppresses a rebellion, and restores his mother Irene to her former position as co-empress of the Byzantine Empire. The rival factions in Constantinople continue their intrigues against Constantine.
- Battle of Marcellae: Constantine VI leads a Byzantine expeditionary force into northern Thrace. At the border castle of Marcellae, near the modern town of Karnobat (Bulgaria), the Bulgarians under Kardam defeat the Byzantines.

==== Europe ====
- The Westphalians rise up against the Saxons, in response to a forcible recruitment for wars against the Avars. However, Pepin, sub-king of Northern Italy and son of King Charlemagne, continues the war, and wins considerable booty from the Avars.
- Charlemagne's son Pepin the Hunchback attempts to rebel against him with the aid of some Frankish nobles. The plot is discovered and Pepin is banished to a monastery at Prüm.

==== Britain ====
- September – King Æthelred I of Northumbria marries Princess Ælfflæd, daughter of King Offa of Mercia, at Catterick. Unrest in Northumbria tempts the exiled king Osred II back to his kingdom from the Isle of Man. His supporters desert him, and Osred II is killed by Æthelred's men at Aynburg. He is buried at Tynemouth Priory.
- Offa arranges coastal defences to fend off Viking attacks. He forms an alliance with Essex, Kent and Sussex, in an attempt to unify England (approximate date).

== Births ==
- Abd al-Rahman II, Muslim emir of Córdoba (d. 852)
- Abo, Japanese prince (d. 842)
- Adrian II, pope of the Catholic Church (d. 872)
- Bai Minzhong, chancellor of the Tang Dynasty (d. 861)
- Virasena, Indian mathematician (d. 853)

== Deaths ==
- August 12 – Jænberht, archbishop of Canterbury
- Cináed mac Artgail, king of Connacht (Ireland)
- Máel Ruain, Irish abbot and founder of Tallaght Abbey
- Michael Lachanodrakon, Byzantine general (strategos)
- Osred II, king of Northumbria
