= Beate Baumann =

German political advisor

Beate Baumann (born July 28, 1963) is a German political advisor. She became known as office manager to German Chancellor Angela Merkel and, alongside Eva Christiansen, as her closest advisor.

== Life ==
After graduating from Gymnasium Carolinum in Osnabrück, Baumann studied English and German language and literature in Münster and Cambridge and passed her state examination in Münster in 1990. Baumann was already politically active during her studies, for example on the state executive committee of the Junge Union in Lower Saxony. On recommendation of Christian Wulff, Baumann became Angela Merkel's advisor in the Federal Youth Ministry in January 1992 and moved with her to the Federal Environment Ministry as office manager in 1995. When Merkel was elected Secretary General of the CDU in 1998, Baumann followed her to the Adenauer House, where she temporarily headed the planning staff in addition to Merkel's office. When Merkel became chairwoman of the CDU/CSU parliamentary group in the Bundestag in 2002 in addition to her office as party chairwoman, Beate Baumann again accompanied her as office manager in the Jakob-Kaiser-Haus. After Merkel's election as Federal Chancellor, Baumann was her office manager in the Federal Chancellery from November 22, 2005, to December 8, 2021. She attended the Morgenlage there, to which only Merkel's closest circle was invited. As Merkel's office manager, Baumann had influence on some decisions. Merkel's decisions to run for the chancellorship again in 2017 and to vote against Marriage for All had to be supported by her as office manager, but she was personally of a different opinion. After the end of Merkel's chancellorship, she told Spiegel that she was working on a biography with her, which would be published in November 2024.

== Film portrayals ==
Baumann was featured in the docudrama Stunden der Entscheidung: Angela Merkel and the Refugees by Tilla Kratochwil and in the feature film Die Getriebenen by Gisela Aderhold.
