= Urbicius (monk) =

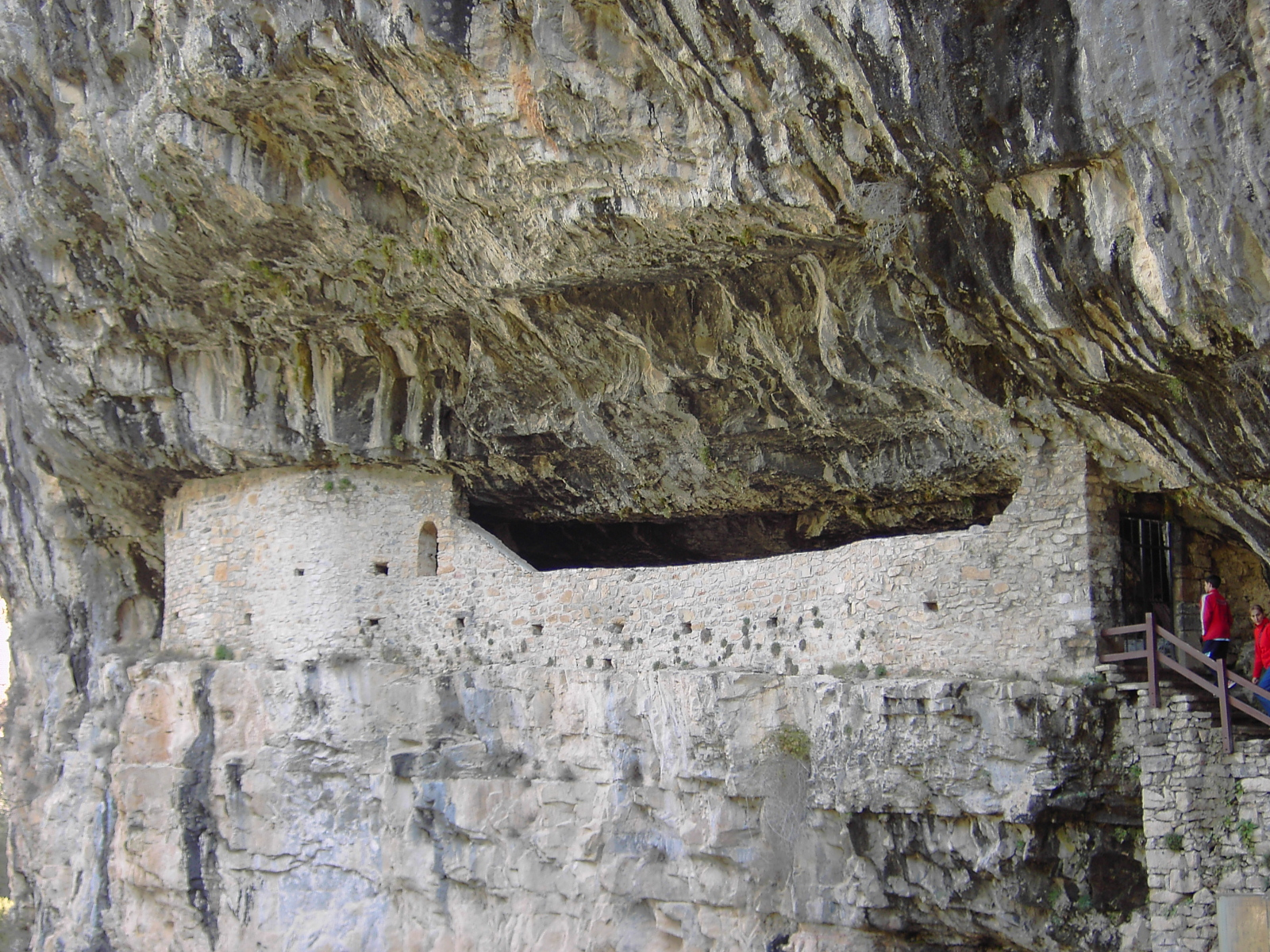

Urbicius (Urbitius, Urbez, Urbex, Urbiz, Urbice; died c. 805) was a monk of West Francia, now a Catholic saint. He was captured by Saracens, escaped, and became a hermit in the Pyrenees, in Aragon. His feast day is 15 December. The Sanctuary of San Úrbez, Huesca, is named after him.
