= Humayd ibn Ma'yuf al-Hajuri =

Ḥumayd ibn Ma'yūf al-Ḥajūrī (Arabic: حميد بن معيوف الحجوري) was an Arab commander in Abbasid service in the early 9th century.

== Biography ==
Humayd hailed from an Arab noble family (ashraf) settled in the Ghuta plain around Damascus. Beginning with his great-grandfather, Ma'yuf ibn Yahya al-Hujari, his family had loyally served the Abbasids and risen to a prominent position in Syria.

In 806, according to al-Tabari, Caliph Harun al-Rashid placed him in charge of "the Levant coastlands of the eastern Mediterranean as far as Egypt". Humayd was sent to raid Cyprus, while the Caliph himself led a major invasion of Byzantine Asia Minor. Humayd ravaged the island, carrying off much plunder and 16,000 of its inhabitants, including the local bishop. They were sold as slaves in the markets of al-Rafiqah, under the supervision of the qadi Abu'l-Bakhtari Wahb ibn Wahb. In the next year, he sailed on another expedition against the Byzantine Empire, this time targeting Rhodes. The island was plundered, but the city of Rhodes resisted his attempts to capture it. On his return trip, he landed at Myra, where he tried to destroy the tomb of Saint Nicholas. A storm arose, however, sinking some of his ships and forcing him to retire, which the locals attributed to the intervention of the saint. It is sometimes considered that before attacking Rhodes, Humayd led his fleet to the Peloponnese, where he either assisted or even fomented a revolt by the local Slavs, leading to the unsuccessful siege of the port city of Patras. It is however possible that the reports of Arab participation in these events are the result of a later interpolation, mixing the real Slavic revolt with subsequent Arab raids.

In the late 810s or the 820s, following a brief tenure by his father, Humayd governed Damascus as deputy to an absent governor of the Jund Dimashq; Paul M. Cobb theorizes that the latter was Nasr ibn Khamza, meaning that Humayd's tenure may have lasted until the appointment of Abu Ishaq, the future al-Mu'tasim, as governor of Syria in 828.

== Sources ==
- Bosworth, C. E., ed. (1989). The History of al-Ṭabarī, Volume XXX: The ʿAbbāsid Caliphate in Equilibrium: The Caliphates of Mūsā al-Hādī and Hārūn al-Rashīd, A.D. 785–809/A.H. 169–192. SUNY Series in Near Eastern Studies. Albany, New York: State University of New York Press. ISBN 978-0-88706-564-4.
- Cobb, Paul M. (2001). White Banners: Contention in 'Abbāsid Syria, 750–880. Albany, NY: State University of New York Press. ISBN 0-7914-4880-0.
- Curta, Florin (2006). Southeastern Europe in the Middle Ages, 500–1250. Cambridge: Cambridge University Press. ISBN 978-0-521-81539-0.
- Lilie, Ralph-Johannes; Ludwig, Claudia; Pratsch, Thomas; Zielke, Beate (2013). Prosopographie der mittelbyzantinischen Zeit Online. Berlin-Brandenburgische Akademie der Wissenschaften. Nach Vorarbeiten F. Winkelmanns erstellt (in German). Berlin and Boston: De Gruyter.
- Treadgold, Warren (1988). The Byzantine Revival, 780–842. Stanford, California: Stanford University Press. ISBN 978-0-8047-1462-4.
