= 733 =

Calendar year

733 in various calendars
Gregorian calendar	733; DCCXXXIII
Ab urbe condita	1486
Armenian calendar	182; ԹՎ ՃՁԲ
Assyrian calendar	5483
Balinese saka calendar	654–655
Bengali calendar	139–140
Berber calendar	1683
Buddhist calendar	1277
Burmese calendar	95
Byzantine calendar	6241–6242
Chinese calendar	壬申年 (Water Monkey); 3430 or 3223 — to — 癸酉年 (Water Rooster); 3431 or 3224
Coptic calendar	449–450
Discordian calendar	1899
Ethiopian calendar	725–726
Hebrew calendar	4493–4494
- Hindu calendars
Vikram Samvat	789–790
Shaka Samvat	654–655
Kali Yuga	3833–3834
Holocene calendar	10733
Iranian calendar	111–112
Islamic calendar	114–115
Japanese calendar	Tenpyō 5 (天平５年)
Javanese calendar	626–627
Julian calendar	733; DCCXXXIII
Korean calendar	3066
Minguo calendar	1179 before ROC 民前1179年
Nanakshahi calendar	−735
Seleucid era	1044/1045 AG
Thai solar calendar	1275–1276
Tibetan calendar	ཆུ་ཕོ་སྤྲེ་ལོ་ (male Water-Monkey); 859 or 478 or −294 — to — ཆུ་མོ་བྱ་ལོ་ (female Water-Bird); 860 or 479 or −293

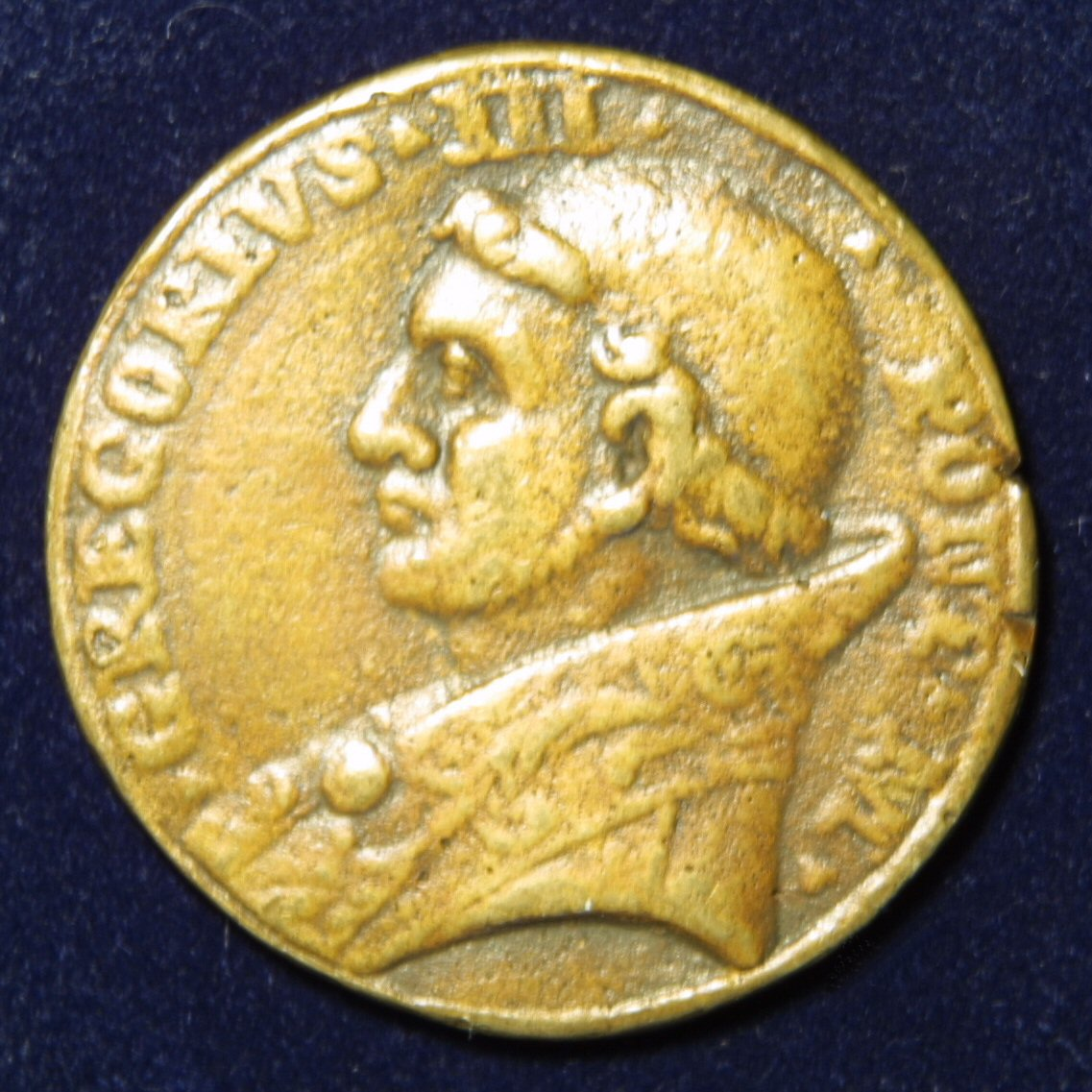
Medallion of pope Gregory III (731–741)

Year 733 (DCCXXXIII) was a common year starting on Thursday of the Julian calendar. The denomination 733 for this year has been used since the early medieval period, when the Anno Domini calendar era became the prevalent method in Europe for naming years.

== Events ==
=== By place ===
==== Byzantine Empire ====
- Emperor Leo III confiscates the papal territories in Sicily and Calabria (Southern Italy), from which Pope Gregory III derives most of his income tax. He transfers ecclesiastical jurisdiction in the former Praetorian prefecture of Illyricum to Anastasius, patriarch of Constantinople. Gregory begins his support of a revolt in Italy against iconoclasm. By now the break between the papacy and the Byzantine Empire is almost complete.
- Arab-Byzantine Wars: Arab forces under Mu’awiya ibn Hisham penetrate deep into Anatolia and conquer the cities of Antalya, Doralyum and Afyonkarahisar. These conquests differ from previous ones, as Arab military settling occurs in them, making them a base to raid Byzantium.

==== Europe ====
- Duke Eudes of Aquitaine, aged almost 80, abdicates and retires to a monastery. His lands are divided between his sons Hunald I and Hatton, who continue the conflict with Charles Martel, mayor of the palace of Neustria and Austrasia. In battles at Benest in Charente and La Rochefoucauld (near Angoulême), Charles probably defeats the Aquitainians. He also campaigns against the Burgundians.
- Umayyad conquest of Hispania: Muslim forces under Abd al-Malik ibn Katan al-Fihri, governor (wali) of Al-Andalus, cross the Pyrenees and ravage both sides of the mountains. He establishes colonies along the Ebro Valley, and within Basque territory. The Moorish main military efforts are in Catalonia, Aragon, Navarre and Septimania (Southern France), strengthening the towns already in their hands.
- Duke Audelais of Benevento and his minor son Gisulf are deposed by King Liutprand of the Lombards. He is succeeded by Gregory, who becomes ruler of Benevento.

== Births ==
- Donnchad Midi, High King of Ireland (d. 797)
- Junnin, emperor of Japan (d. 765)
- Lu Yu, Chinese author (d. 804)

== Deaths ==
- Eochaid mac Echdach, king of Dál Riata (modern Scotland)
- Li Yuanhong, chancellor of the Tang Dynasty
- Mildrith, Anglo-Saxon abbess (approximate date)
- Muhammad al-Baqir, fifth Shia imam and descendant of Muhammad
- Yamanoue no Okura, Japanese poet (approximate date)
