= 856 =

Calendar year

856 in various calendars
Gregorian calendar	856; DCCCLVI
Ab urbe condita	1609
Armenian calendar	305; ԹՎ ՅԵ
Assyrian calendar	5606
Balinese saka calendar	777–778
Bengali calendar	262–263
Berber calendar	1806
Buddhist calendar	1400
Burmese calendar	218
Byzantine calendar	6364–6365
Chinese calendar	乙亥年 (Wood Pig); 3553 or 3346 — to — 丙子年 (Fire Rat); 3554 or 3347
Coptic calendar	572–573
Discordian calendar	2022
Ethiopian calendar	848–849
Hebrew calendar	4616–4617
- Hindu calendars
Vikram Samvat	912–913
Shaka Samvat	777–778
Kali Yuga	3956–3957
Holocene calendar	10856
Iranian calendar	234–235
Islamic calendar	241–242
Japanese calendar	Saikō 3 (斉衡３年)
Javanese calendar	753–754
Julian calendar	856; DCCCLVI
Korean calendar	3189
Minguo calendar	1056 before ROC 民前1056年
Nanakshahi calendar	−612
Seleucid era	1167/1168 AG
Thai solar calendar	1398–1399
Tibetan calendar	ཤིང་མོ་ཕག་ལོ་ (female Wood-Boar); 982 or 601 or −171 — to — མེ་ཕོ་བྱི་བ་ལོ་ (male Fire-Rat); 983 or 602 or −170

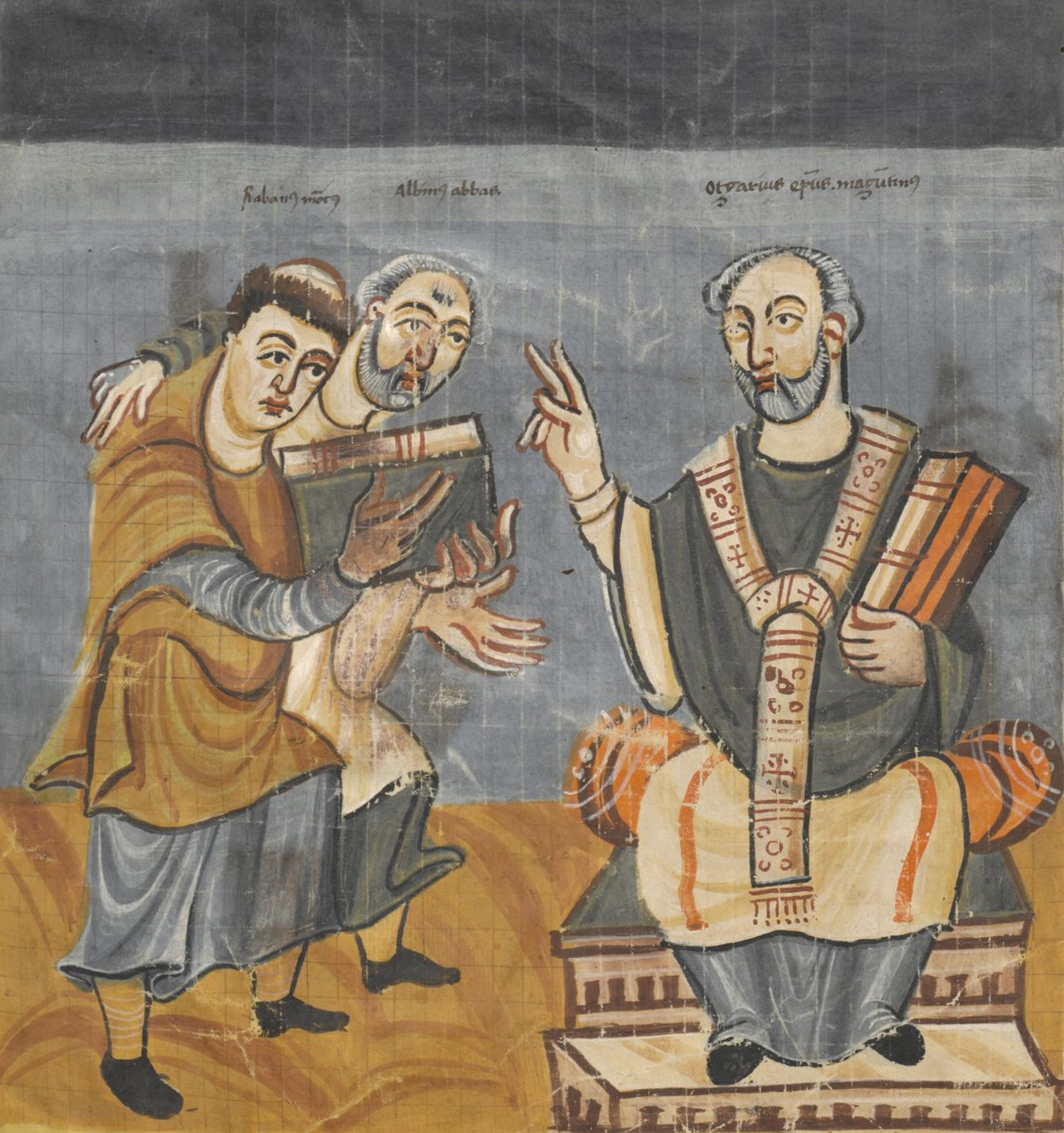
Rabanus Maurus (left) presents his work to archbishop Odgar of Mainz (right)

Year 856 (DCCCLVI) was a leap year starting on Wednesday of the Julian calendar.

== Events ==
=== By place ===
==== Byzantine Empire ====
- March 15 – Emperor Michael III overthrows the regency of his mother Theodora. He appoints his uncle Bardas as the de facto regent and co-ruler of the Byzantine Empire.

==== Europe ====
- King Charles the Bald cedes the county of Maine to Erispoe, ruler (duke) of Brittany—this in return for an alliance against the Vikings.
- King Ordoño I of Asturias is said to have begun the repopulation of the town of León in the northwest of Spain (approximate date).

==== Britain ====
- October 1 – King Æthelwulf of Wessex marries the 12- or 13-year-old Judith, daughter of Charles the Bald, at Verberie (Northern France). She is crowned queen and anointed by Hincmar, archbishop of Reims. The marriage is a diplomatic alliance between Wessex and the West Frankish Kingdom.
- Winter – Æthelwulf returns to Wessex to face a revolt by his eldest son Æthelbald, who usurps the throne. Æthelwulf agrees to give up the western part of his kingdom, in order to avoid a civil war. He keeps control over Sussex, Surrey, Essex and Kent, over which Prince Æthelberht has presided.

=== By topic ===
==== Geology ====
- November (approximate date) – An earthquake in Corinth, Greece kills an estimated 45,000 people.
- December 3 – Another earthquake strikes the Abbasid Caliphate (modern-day Tunisia), also killing an estimated 45,000 people.
- December 22 – Another earthquake strikes Damghan (modern-day Iran), killing an estimated 200,000 people.

== Births ==
- October 24 – Li Keyong, Shatuo governor (jiedushi) (d. 908)
- Li Maozhen, Chinese warlord and king (d. 924)

== Deaths ==
- January 7 – Aldric, bishop of Le Mans
- February 4 – Rabanus Maurus, archbishop of Mainz
- August 6 – Fujiwara no Nagara, Japanese statesman (b. 802)
- August 16 – Theutbald I, bishop of Langres
- Florinus of Remüs, Frankish priest and martyr
- Godfrid Haraldsson, Viking chieftain (approximate date)
- Guerin, Frankish nobleman (or 845)
- Ilyas ibn Asad, Muslim emir (approximate date)
- Muhammad I Abu 'l-Abbas, Muslim emir

== Sources ==
- Abels, Richard (2002). "Royal Succession and the Growth of Political Stability in Ninth-Century Wessex". The Haskins Society Journal. 12. Woodbridge, UK: Boydell & Brewer: 83–97. doi:10.1515/9781846150852-007 (inactive July 1, 2025). ISBN 1-84383-008-6. JSTOR 10.7722/j.ctt81qkc.
- Keynes, Simon (1998). "King Alfred and the Mercians". In Blackburn, Mark A. S.; Dumville, David N. (eds.). Kings, Currency and Alliances: History and Coinage of Southern England in the Ninth Century. Woodbridge, UK: The Boydell Press. pp. 1–45. ISBN 0-85115-598-7.
- Treadgold, Warren (1997). A History of the Byzantine State and Society. Stanford, California: Stanford University Press. ISBN 0-8047-2630-2.
