= 853 =

Calendar year

853 in various calendars
| Gregorian calendar | 853; DCCCLIII |
| Ab urbe condita | 1606 |
| Armenian calendar | 302; ԹՎ ՅԲ |
| Assyrian calendar | 5603 |
| Balinese saka calendar | 774–775 |
| Bengali calendar | 259–260 |
| Berber calendar | 1803 |
| Buddhist calendar | 1397 |
| Burmese calendar | 215 |
| Byzantine calendar | 6361–6362 |
| Chinese calendar | 壬申年 (Water Monkey); 3550 or 3343 — to — 癸酉年 (Water Rooster); 3551 or 3344 |
| Coptic calendar | 569–570 |
| Discordian calendar | 2019 |
| Ethiopian calendar | 845–846 |
| Hebrew calendar | 4613–4614 |
- Hindu calendars
| Vikram Samvat | 909–910 |
| Shaka Samvat | 774–775 |
| Kali Yuga | 3953–3954 |
| Holocene calendar | 10853 |
| Iranian calendar | 231–232 |
| Islamic calendar | 238–239 |
| Japanese calendar | Ninju 3 (仁寿３年) |
| Javanese calendar | 750–751 |
| Julian calendar | 853; DCCCLIII |
| Korean calendar | 3186 |
| Minguo calendar | 1059 before ROC 民前1059年 |
| Nanakshahi calendar | −615 |
| Seleucid era | 1164/1165 AG |
| Thai solar calendar | 1395–1396 |
| Tibetan calendar | 阳水猴年 (male Water-Monkey); 979 or 598 or −174 — to — 阴水鸡年 (female Water-Rooster); 980 or 599 or −173 |

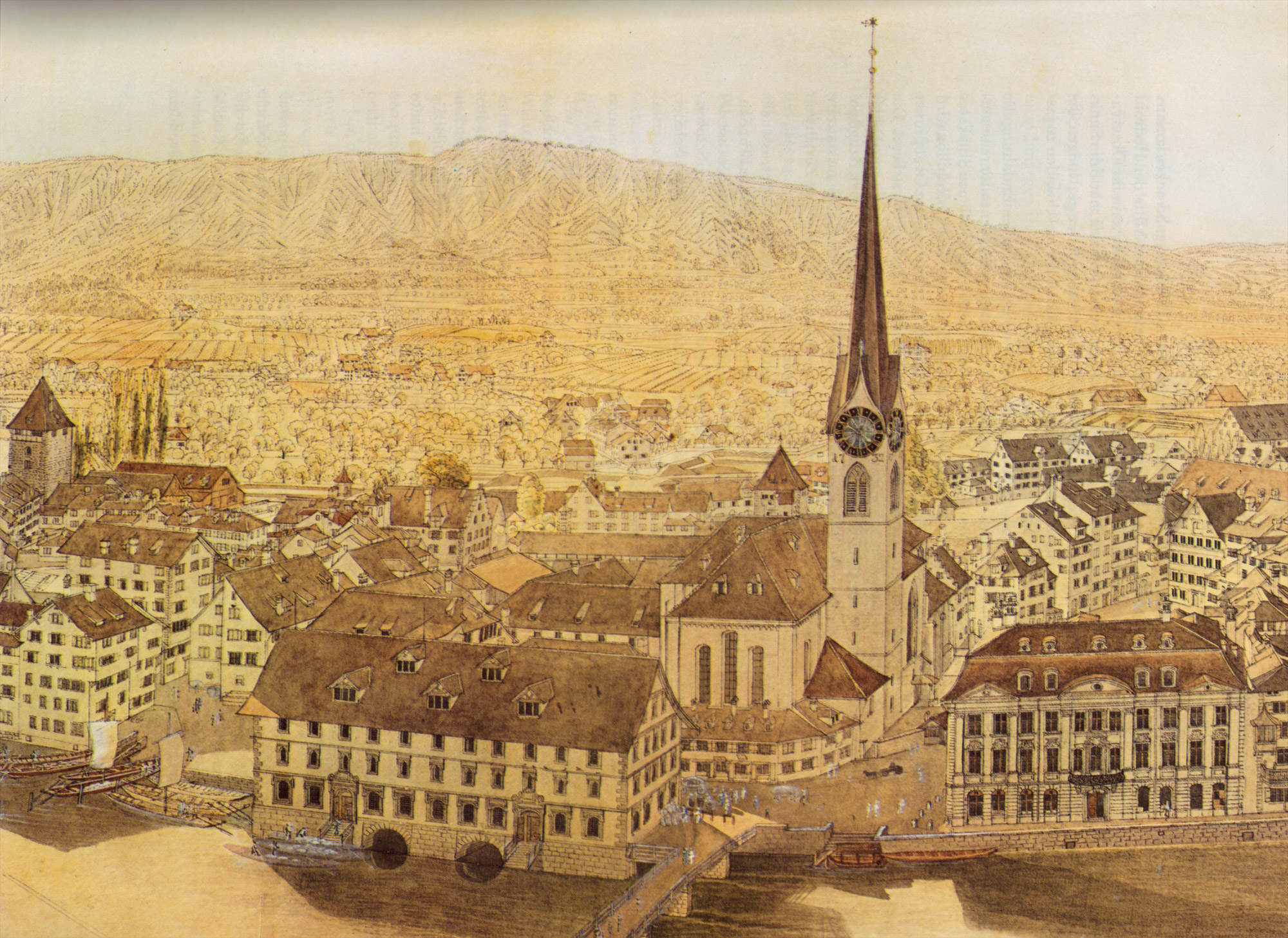
The Fraumünster Church (Switzerland)

Year 853 (DCCCLIII) was a common year starting on Sunday of the Julian calendar.

== Events ==
=== By place ===
==== Byzantine Empire ====
- May 22 – A Byzantine fleet (85 ships and 5,000 men) sacks and destroys the port city of Damietta, located on the Nile Delta in Egypt. A large quantity of weapons and supplies intended for the Emirate of Crete are captured.

==== Europe ====
- Danish Vikings attempt to subjugate the Curonians on the shoreline of the Baltic Sea, but they are repulsed. King Olof leads Swedish Vikings in retaliation, and attacks the towns of Seeburg and Apuolė (modern Courland).
- Viking marauders in Gaul sail eastward from Nantes without opposition, and reach Tours. The monasteries at Saint-Florent-le-Vieil and Marmoutier are ravaged.
- King Charles the Bald bribes Boris I, ruler (khan) of the Bulgarian Empire, to form an alliance against his brother Louis the German, with Rastislav of Moravia.
- Gauzbert, count of Maine, is killed during an ambush by citizens of Nantes, in revenge for the death of Lambert II.

==== Britain ====
- King Burgred of Mercia appeals to Æthelwulf, king of the West Saxons, for help against the rebellious Welsh king Rhodri the Great. Æthelwulf agrees to send help, and Wales is subdued as far north as Anglesey.
- Burgred (who inherited his crown last year) marries Æthelwulf's daughter Æthelswith, during a ceremony at the royal estate at Chippenham.

==== China ====
- Tuan Ch'eng-Shih, Chinese author and scholar during the Tang Dynasty, publishes Miscellaneous Offerings from Yu-yang.

=== By topic ===
==== Religion ====
- The Fraumünster Church in Zürich (modern Switzerland) is founded by Louis the German.

== Births ==
- Abu Jafar al-Tahawi, Muslim scholar (d. 933)
- Abu Mansur al-Maturidi, Muslim theologian (d. 944)
- Adelaide, queen of the West Frankish Kingdom (or 850)
- Ma Yin, Chinese warlord and king (approximate date)

== Deaths ==
- March 27 – Haymo, bishop of Halberstadt
- Áilgenán mac Donngaile, king of Munster (Ireland)
- Columba, Spanish nun and martyr
- Ealhere, Kentish thegn
- Gauzbert, count of Maine (approximate date)
- Ishaq ibn Isma'il, emir of Tbilisi (Georgia)
- Ishaq ibn Rahwayh, Muslim imam (or 852)
- Konstanti Kakhi, Georgian nobleman (b. 768)
- Ono no Takamura, Japanese scholar (b. 802)
- Theodrada, Frankish abbess, daughter of Charlemagne (or 844)
- Virasena, Indian mathematician (b. 792)

== Sources ==
- Bury, John Bagnell (1912). A History of the Eastern Roman Empire from the Fall of Irene to the Accession of Basil I (A.D. 802–867). London: Macmillan and Company.
- Goldberg, Eric J. (2006). Struggle for Empire: Kingship and Conflict under Louis the German, 817-876. Ithaca, NY: Cornell University Press. ISBN 9780801438905.
