= 852 =

Calendar year

852 in various calendars
| Gregorian calendar | 852; DCCCLII |
| Ab urbe condita | 1605 |
| Armenian calendar | 301; ԹՎ ՅԱ |
| Assyrian calendar | 5602 |
| Balinese saka calendar | 773–774 |
| Bengali calendar | 258–259 |
| Berber calendar | 1802 |
| Buddhist calendar | 1396 |
| Burmese calendar | 214 |
| Byzantine calendar | 6360–6361 |
| Chinese calendar | 辛未年 (Metal Goat); 3549 or 3342 — to — 壬申年 (Water Monkey); 3550 or 3343 |
| Coptic calendar | 568–569 |
| Discordian calendar | 2018 |
| Ethiopian calendar | 844–845 |
| Hebrew calendar | 4612–4613 |
- Hindu calendars
| Vikram Samvat | 908–909 |
| Shaka Samvat | 773–774 |
| Kali Yuga | 3952–3953 |
| Holocene calendar | 10852 |
| Iranian calendar | 230–231 |
| Islamic calendar | 237–238 |
| Japanese calendar | Ninju 2 (仁寿２年) |
| Javanese calendar | 749–750 |
| Julian calendar | 852; DCCCLII |
| Korean calendar | 3185 |
| Minguo calendar | 1060 before ROC 民前1060年 |
| Nanakshahi calendar | −616 |
| Seleucid era | 1163/1164 AG |
| Thai solar calendar | 1394–1395 |
| Tibetan calendar | 阴金羊年 (female Iron-Goat); 978 or 597 or −175 — to — 阳水猴年 (male Water-Monkey); 979 or 598 or −174 |

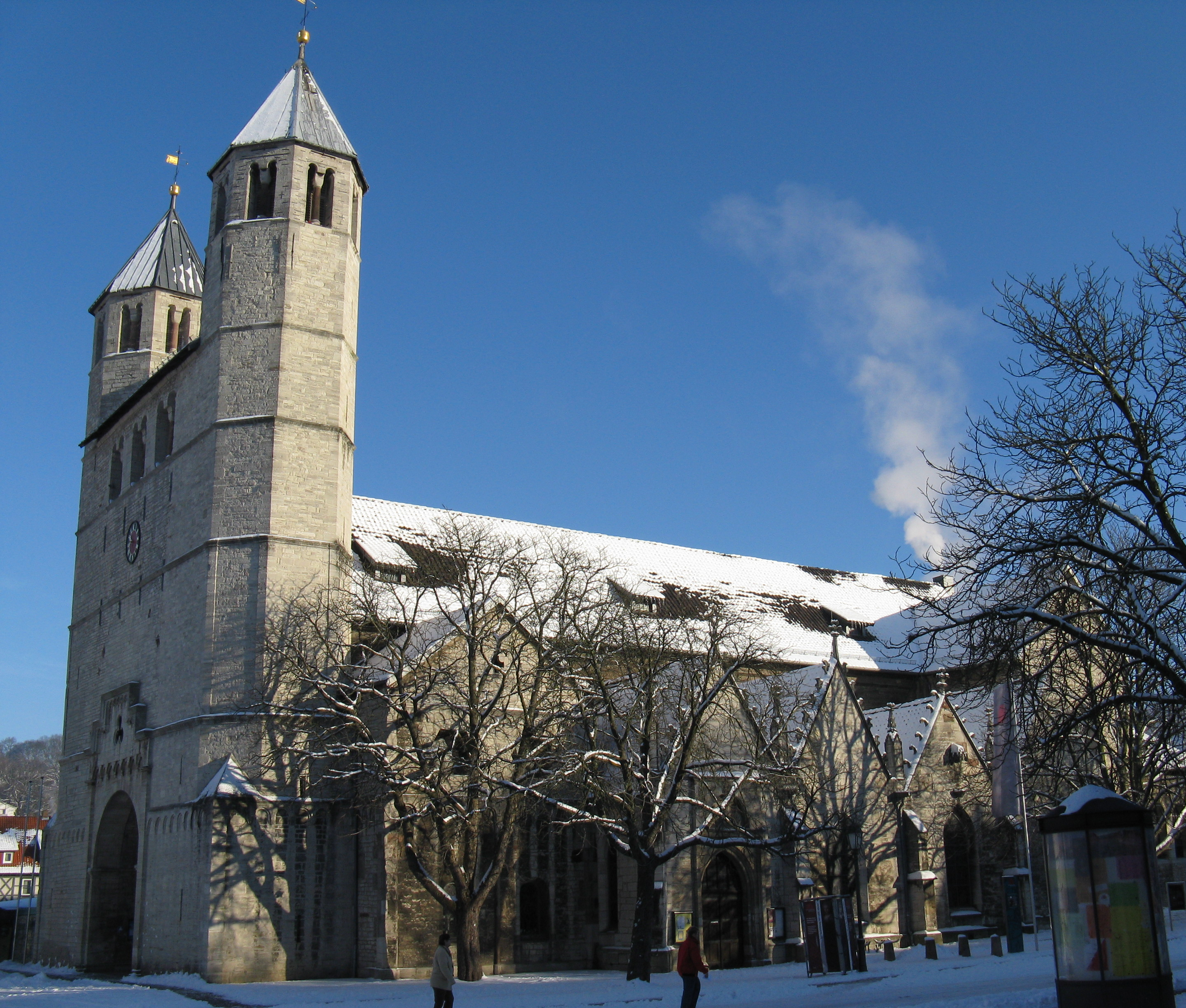
Gandersheim Abbey church (Germany)

Year 852 (DCCCLII) was a leap year starting on Friday of the Julian calendar.

== Events ==
=== By place ===
==== Europe ====
- March 4 – Trpimir I, duke (knez) of Croatia, and founder of the Trpimirović dynasty, issues a first state document in Bijaći of all Slavonic peoples. In this Latin document Trpimir refers to himself as the "duke of the Croats" (dux Chroatorum), and to his country as the "state of the Croats" (regnum Chroatorum).
- Presian I, ruler (khan) of the Bulgarian Empire, dies after a 23-year reign in which the Bulgarians have expanded into Upper Macedonia and Serbia. He is succeeded by his son Boris I, as monarch of Bulgaria.
- Emperor Lothair I and his (half) brother Charles the Bald join forces to remove the Vikings from the island of Oscelles, in the River Seine. After this fails, Charles again pays them tribute (Danegeld).

==== Britain ====
- A Viking fleet of 350 vessels enters the Thames Estuary before turning north, and engages the Mercian forces under King Beorhtwulf. The Mercians are defeated, and retreat to their settlements. The Vikings then turn south and cross the river somewhere in Surrey; there they are slaughtered by a West Saxon army, led by King Æthelwulf and his son Aethelbald, at Oak Field (Aclea).
- King Æthelstan, the eldest son of Æthelwulf, is killed by a Viking raiding party. He is succeeded by his brother Æthelberht, who becomes sub-king of Kent, Essex, Surrey and Sussex (approximate date).
- Beorhtwulf dies after a 12-year reign, and is succeeded by his son Burgred as king of Mercia.

==== Al-Andalus ====
- Abd al-Rahman II, Umayyad emir of Córdoba, dies after a 30-year reign in which he has made additions to the Mosque–Cathedral at Córdoba. He is succeeded by his son Muhammad I, who will put down several revolts of the Muwalladun and Mozarabs in Muslim controlled areas in al-Andalus (modern Spain).

=== By topic ===
==== Aviation ====
- According to a 17th century account, the Andalusian inventor Abbas ibn Firnas makes a tower jump in Córdoba. He wraps himself with vulture feathers and attaches two wings to his arms. The alleged attempt to fly is not recorded in earlier sources and is ultimately unsuccessful, but the garment slows his fall enough that he only sustains minor injuries.

==== Religion ====
- Gandersheim Abbey in Lower Saxony (modern Germany) is founded by Duke Liudolf of Saxony.

== Births ==
- March 10 – Qian Liu, Chinese warlord and king (d. 932)
- Bořivoj I, duke of Bohemia (approximate date)
- Nicholas I Mystikos, Byzantine patriarch (d. 925)
- Yang Xingmi, Chinese governor (jiedushi) (d. 905)
- Ermengard of Italy, queen regent of Provence (d. 896)
- Zhang Quanyi, Chinese warlord (d. 926)
- Zhu Wen, emperor of Later Liang (d. 912)

== Deaths ==
- Abd al-Rahman II, Muslim emir of Córdoba (b. 792)
- Æthelstan, king of Kent (approximate date)
- Aleran, Frankish count and margrave
- Aurelius and Natalia, Christian martyrs
- Beorhtwulf (Bright Wolf), king of Mercia
- Du Mu, Chinese poet and official (b. 803)
- Fredelo, Frankish count (approximate date)
- Harald Klak, king of Denmark (approximate date)
- Íñigo Arista, king of Pamplona (or 851)
- Ishaq ibn Rahwayh, Muslim imam (or 853)
- Lambert II, Frankish count and prefect
- Li Jue, chancellor of the Tang Dynasty
- Presian I, ruler (khan) of the Bulgarian Empire
