= 872 =

Calendar year

872 in various calendars
Gregorian calendar	872; DCCCLXXII
Ab urbe condita	1625
Armenian calendar	321; ԹՎ ՅԻԱ
Assyrian calendar	5622
Balinese saka calendar	793–794
Bengali calendar	278–279
Berber calendar	1822
Buddhist calendar	1416
Burmese calendar	234
Byzantine calendar	6380–6381
Chinese calendar	辛卯年 (Metal Rabbit); 3569 or 3362 — to — 壬辰年 (Water Dragon); 3570 or 3363
Coptic calendar	588–589
Discordian calendar	2038
Ethiopian calendar	864–865
Hebrew calendar	4632–4633
- Hindu calendars
Vikram Samvat	928–929
Shaka Samvat	793–794
Kali Yuga	3972–3973
Holocene calendar	10872
Iranian calendar	250–251
Islamic calendar	258–259
Japanese calendar	Jōgan 14 (貞観１４年)
Javanese calendar	770–771
Julian calendar	872; DCCCLXXII
Korean calendar	3205
Minguo calendar	1040 before ROC 民前1040年
Nanakshahi calendar	−596
Seleucid era	1183/1184 AG
Thai solar calendar	1414–1415
Tibetan calendar	阴金兔年 (female Iron-Rabbit); 998 or 617 or −155 — to — 阳水龙年 (male Water-Dragon); 999 or 618 or −154

Year 872 (DCCCLXXII) was a leap year starting on Tuesday of the Julian calendar.

== Events ==
=== By place ===
==== Europe ====
- Sancho III Mitarra (or Menditarra) becomes the founder and first 'king' of the independent Duchy of Gascony, with loose ties to the Frankish Kingdom.
- May 18 – After his successful campaign against the Saracens, Louis II is crowned as Roman Emperor ("Emperor of the Franks") for the second time and converts the Muwalladun, and the Arab elite.
- 18 July (traditional date) – Battle of Hafrsfjord: Norse chieftain Harald Fairhair wins a great naval victory at Hafrsfjord, outside Stavanger. He becomes (at age 18) the first king of Norway. Harald's conquests and taxation system lead many Viking chiefs and their followers to emigrate to the British Isles, and (later) to Iceland.

==== Britain ====
- Autumn – The Great Heathen Army returns to Northumbria, to put down a rebellion at York. King Ecgberht I and his archbishop, Wulfhere, are expelled by the Northumbrians and flee to Mercia.
- The Danes, led by Halfdan and Guthrum, establish a winter quarter at Torksey in the Kingdom of Lindsey (now part of Lincolnshire). King Burgred pays tribute (Danegeld) in return for 'peace'.
- King Artgal of Strathclyde is slain, through the connivance of King Constantine I of Alba (modern Scotland) and his Viking allies. Artgal's son, Run, succeeds to the Strathclyde throne.

==== Arabian Empire ====
- The Zanj Rebellion: The Zanj (black slaves from East Africa) defeat the Abbasid forces, led by caliphal regent Al-Muwaffaq (brother of caliph Al-Mu'tamid). Hostilities in Mesopotamia (Southern Iraq) will preoccupy Al-Muwaffaq, and the Zanj will remain on the offensive over the next several years.
- In Egypt, the first hospital (bimaristan) is built in Cairo by the Abbasid governor, Ahmad ibn Tulun. Physician licensure becomes mandatory in the Abbasid Caliphate.

==== Japan ====
- Fujiwara no Yoshifusa, Japanese regent (sesshō), dies at his native Kyoto, having ruled since 858. He is succeeded as head of the Fujiwara clan by his son Fujiwara no Mototsune.

=== By topic ===
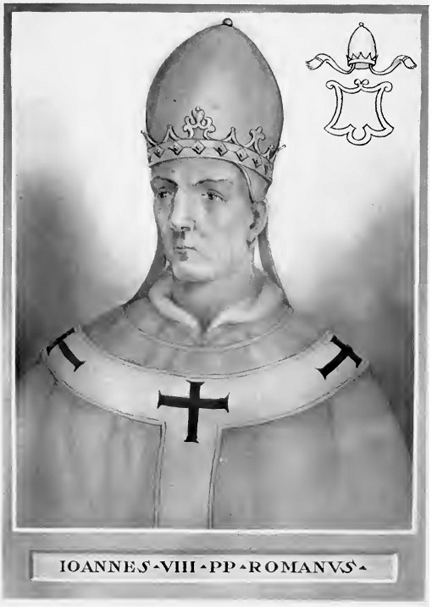
Pope John VIII (872–882)

==== Religion ====
- December 14 – Pope Adrian II dies (at age 80), after a 5-year reign. He is succeeded by John VIII, as the 107th pope of Rome.

== Births ==
- Abaoji, ruler (khagan) of the Khitan Empire (d. 926)
- Al-Farabi, Muslim philosopher (approximate date)
- Huo Yanwei, Chinese general (d. 928)
- Ibn Durustawayh, Persian grammarian, lexicographer and student of the Quran and hadith (d. 958)
- Ki no Tsurayuki, Japanese writer and poet (d. 945)
- Pietro II Candiano, doge of Venice (approximate date)

== Deaths ==
- April 2 – Muflih al-Turki, Abbasid general
- December 14 – Adrian II, pope of Rome (b. 792)
- Artgal, king of Strathclyde (Scotland)
- Athanasius I, bishop of Naples (b. 830)
- Cenn Fáelad hua Mugthigirn, king of Munster (Ireland)
- Chrysocheir, leader of the Paulicians (or 878)
- Fujiwara no Yoshifusa, Japanese regent (b. 804)
- Ibrahim ibn Ya'qub al-Juzajani, Muslim hadith scholar
- Ivar the Boneless, Viking chief (approximate date)
- Sargis, patriarch of the Church of the East
- Zhang Yichao, general of the Tang Dynasty (b. 785)

== Sources ==
- Collins, Roger (1990). The Basques. Blackwell. ISBN 978-0-631-17565-0.
- Hill, Paul (2009). The Viking Wars of Alfred the Great. Pen & Sword History. ISBN 978-1-59416-087-5.
- "Islamic Culture and the Medical Arts".
- McKinney, Robert C. (2004). The Case of Rhyme Versus Reason: Ibn Al-Råumåi and His Poetics in Context. Brill. ISBN 978-90-04-13010-4.
- Nöldeke, Theodor (1892). Sketches from Eastern History. London and Edinburgh: Adam and Charles Black.
- Popovic, Alexandre (1999). The Revolt of African Slaves in Iraq, in the 3rd/9th Century. Princeton: Markus Wiener Publishers. ISBN 1-55876-162-4.
- Rucquoi, Adeline (1993). Histoire médiévale de la Péninsule ibérique. Paris: Seuil. p. 85. ISBN 2-02-012935-3.
- Waines, David, ed. (1992). The History of al-Ṭabarī, Volume XXXVI: The Revolt of the Zanj, A.D. 869–879/A.H. 255–265. Albany, New York: State University of New York Press. ISBN 0-7914-0764-0.
