= 804 =

Calendar year

804 in various calendars
Gregorian calendar	804; DCCCIV
Ab urbe condita	1557
Armenian calendar	253; ԹՎ ՄԾԳ
Assyrian calendar	5554
Balinese saka calendar	725–726
Bengali calendar	210–211
Berber calendar	1754
Buddhist calendar	1348
Burmese calendar	166
Byzantine calendar	6312–6313
Chinese calendar	癸未年 (Water Goat); 3501 or 3294 — to — 甲申年 (Wood Monkey); 3502 or 3295
Coptic calendar	520–521
Discordian calendar	1970
Ethiopian calendar	796–797
Hebrew calendar	4564–4565
- Hindu calendars
Vikram Samvat	860–861
Shaka Samvat	725–726
Kali Yuga	3904–3905
Holocene calendar	10804
Iranian calendar	182–183
Islamic calendar	188–189
Japanese calendar	Enryaku 23 (延暦２３年)
Javanese calendar	699–700
Julian calendar	804; DCCCIV
Korean calendar	3137
Minguo calendar	1108 before ROC 民前1108年
Nanakshahi calendar	−664
Seleucid era	1115/1116 AG
Thai solar calendar	1346–1347
Tibetan calendar	阴水羊年 (female Water-Goat); 930 or 549 or −223 — to — 阳木猴年 (male Wood-Monkey); 931 or 550 or −222

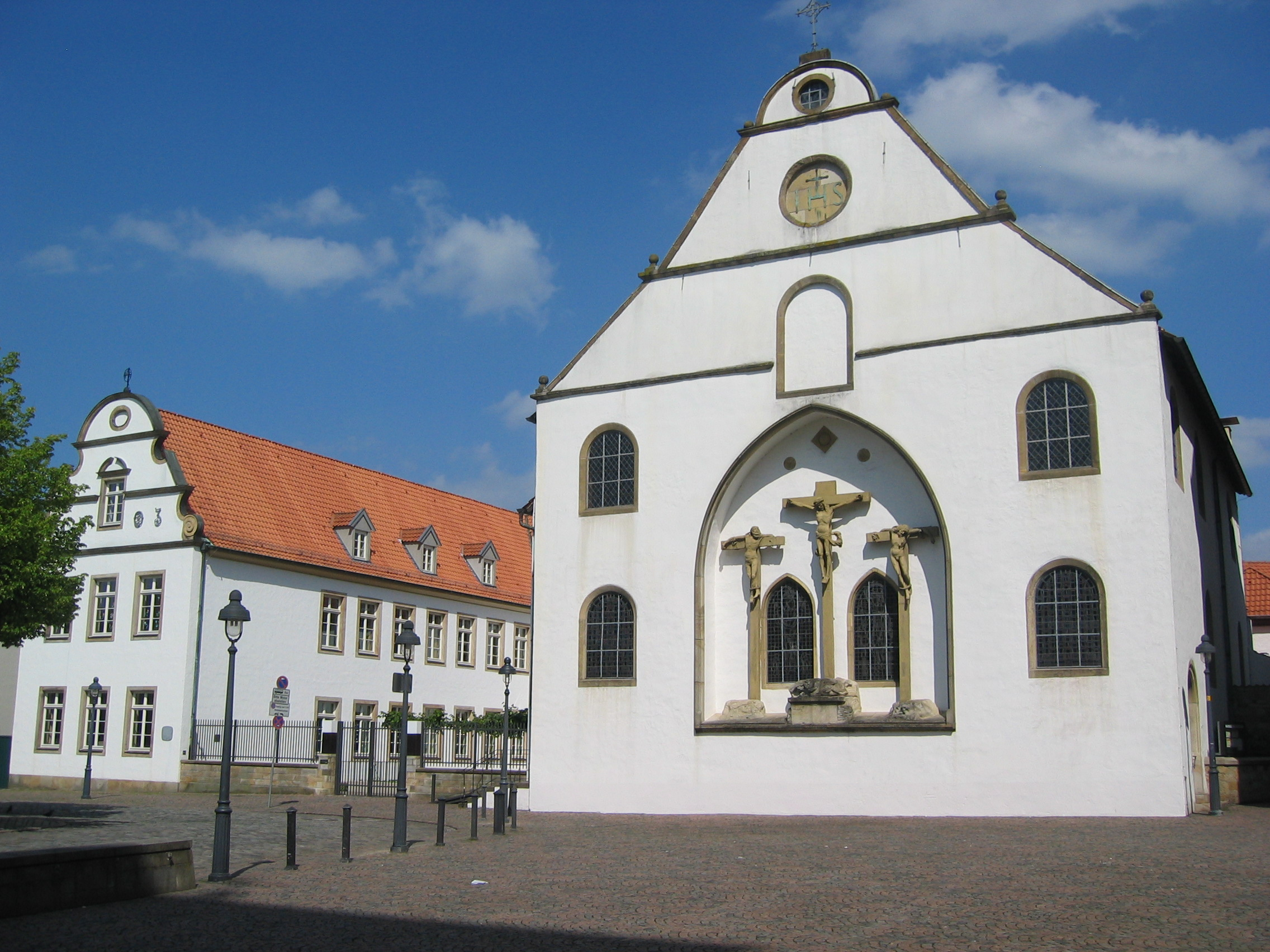
The Gymnasium Carolinum in Osnabrück

Year 804 (DCCCIV) was a leap year starting on Monday of the Julian calendar.

== Events ==
=== By place ===
==== Abbasid Caliphate ====
- Battle of Krasos: Emperor Nikephoros I refuses to pay the tribute imposed by Caliph Harun al-Rashid of the Abbasid Caliphate. A Muslim-Arab expeditionary force invades Asia Minor. During a surprise attack, Nikephoros suffers a major defeat against the Saracens at Krasos in Phrygia. According to Arabian sources, the Byzantines lose 40,700 men and 4,000 pack animals, while Nikephoros himself is almost killed, but saved by the bravery of his officers.
- Abbasid caliph Harun al-Rashid marries Abbasa, the daughter of Abbasid prince and official Sulayman.

==== Europe ====
- Summer – Emperor Charlemagne finishes the conquest of Saxony. The Carolingian administration in the north is restored and the diocese of Bremen is re-established. Venice, torn by infighting, switches allegiance from Constantinople to King Pepin of Italy, son of Charlemagne.
- Obelerio degli Antenori becomes the ninth doge of Venice, after his predecessor Giovanni Galbaio flees to Mantua, where he is killed.
- The Gymnasium Carolinum in Osnabrück is founded by Charlemagne (the oldest school in Germany).

==== Asia ====
- Kūkai, Japanese Buddhist monk, travels in a government-sponsored expedition to China, in order to learn more about the Mahavairocana Sutra. He brings back texts of Shingon (Esoteric Buddhism).
- Priest Saichō, patriarch of Tendai Buddhism, visits China and reportedly brings back tea seeds (or 805).
- The Inscription of Sukabumi from Eastern Java marks the beginning of the Javanese language.

=== By topic ===
==== Religion ====
- Ludger, Frisian missionary, becomes the first bishop of Münster, and builds a monastery there.

== Births ==
- Bayazid Bastami, Persian Sufi (d. 874)
- Fujiwara no Yoshifusa, Japanese regent (d. 872)

== Deaths ==
- May 19 – Alcuin, bishop and advisor to Charlemagne
- October 1 – Richbod, archbishop of Trier
- Saint Abundantia, Christian saint
- Giovanni Galbaio, doge of Venice (approximate date)
- Ibrahim al-Mawsili, musician and singer (b. 742)
- Lu Yu, Chinese author of The Classic of Tea (b. 733)
- Ragnar Lothbrok Legendary Norse Viking hero and Scandinavian King.
