= Umm Muhammad bint Salih =

Abbasid princess

Umm Muhammad bint Salih أم محمد بنت صالح

Consort of the Abbasid caliph
- Predecessor: Azizah bint al-Ghitrif, Amat al-Aziz Ghadir
- Successor: Abbasa bint Sulayman
- Born: c. 770s Baghdad, Abbasid Caliphate
- Died: 810s Baghdad, Abbasid Caliphate
- Spouse: Ibrahim ibn al-Mahdi (divorced around 800); Harun al-Rashid (m. 803)
Names
- Umm Muhammad bint Salih al-Miskin ibn Abdallah al-Mansur
- Dynasty: Abbasid
- Father: Salih al-Miskin ibn Abdallah al-Mansur
- Mother: Umm Abdallah bint Isa ibn Ali
- Religion: Islam

Umm Muḥammad bint Ṣāliḥ (Arabic: أم محمد بنت صالح) was an Abbasid princess, niece of third Abbasid caliph al-Mahdi and wife of caliph Harun al-Rashid.

== Ancestry ==
Her full name was Umm Muhammad bint Salih al-Miskin ibn Abdullah al-Mansur.

Her grandmother was the concubine Qali-al Farrashah. She was a Greek, and was the mother of Al-Mansur's son Salih al-Miskin. Her father, Salih al-Miskin, was one of the youngest sons of caliph Al-Mansur.

== Biography ==
Umm Muhammad was the wife of the Abbasid caliph Harun al-Rashid. He was also her half-cousin. Umm Muhammad was the daughter of Salih al-Miskin and Umm Abdullah, the daughter of Isa ibn Ali ibn Abd Allah ibn al-Abbas. They married in November-December 803 in Al-Raqqah. She had formerly been married to Ibrahim ibn al-Mahdi, who had repudiated her.

Her first husband Ibrahim was the half-brother of Harun al-Rashid. She married him in the early 780s; however, just a few years later Ibrahim separated from her. After her formal divorce from her first husband, Caliph Harun al-Rashid married her. Umm Muhammad became the second wife of Harun al-Rashid from the Abbasid house. His first wife Zubaidah bint Ja'far was also an Abbasid princess and granddaughter of al-Mansur. She spent most her life after marriage with Al-Rashid at the Caliphal palace along with al-Rashid's other wives. She died in 810s.

== Family ==
Umm Muhammad was related to Abbasid house both paternally and maternally. She was contemporary and related to several Abbasid caliphs, prince and princesses.

No.	Abbasids	Relation
1	Al-Mahdi	Uncle and Father-in-law
2	Musa al-Hadi	Cousins and Brother-in-law
3	Harun al-Rashid	Husband
4	Al-Amin	Step-son
5	Al-Ma'mun	Step-son
6	Al-Qasim ibn Harun al-Rashid	Step-son
7	Ali ibn Harun al-Rashid	Step-son
8	Sukaynah bint Harun al-Rashid	Step-daughter
9	Hamdunah bint Harun al-Rashid	Step-daughter
10	Fatimah bint Harun al-Rashid	Step-daughter
11	Isa ibn al-Mahdi	Cousin and Brother-in-law

== Sources ==
- Al-Tabari; Hugh Kennedy (1990). The History of al-Tabari Vol. 29: Al-Mansur and al-Mahdi A.D. 763-786/A.H. 146-169
- al-Tabari, Muhammad Ibn Yarir; Bosworth, Clifford Edmund (1989). The History of al-Tabari Vol. 30: The 'Abbasid Caliphate in Equilibrium: The Caliphates of Musa al-Hadi and Harun al-Rashid A.D. 785-809/A.H. 169-193. Bibliotheca Persica. State University of New York Press. ISBN 978-0-88706-564-4.
- Abbott, Nabia (1946). Two Queens of Baghdad: Mother and Wife of Hārūn Al Rashīd. University of Chicago Press. ISBN 978-0-86356-031-6.
