= Gymnasium Carolinum (Osnabrück) =

School in Germany, established 804 AD

Coordinates: 52°16′40.50″N 8°02′44.00″E

Location
- Osnabrück; Germany

Information
- Established: 804; 1221 years ago
- Founder: Charlemagne
- Grades: Class 5 - Class 13
- Gender: Boys (804-1971); Mixed (1971-Present)
- Enrollment: 1002
- Language: German
- Website: https://carolinum-osnabrueck.de/

The Gymnasium Carolinum in Osnabrück, Germany, was founded in 804 by Charlemagne, king of the Franks. It is reputedly the oldest school in Germany and is also one of the oldest surviving schools in the world.

== History ==
In 1632, the Gymnasium was elevated into a university by the Jesuits. However, Swedish troops captured Osnabrück the next year for the Protestant side in the Thirty Years' War, and the Academia Carolina Osnabrugensis was closed. There would not be a university in Osnabrück until the University of Osnabrück opened in 1974.

=== Twentieth century ===
In 1933 the boys' school of the Gymnasium Carolinum had twenty-two teachers, all of whom were Catholics and thirteen of whom had served in the First World War. Only one had up to that point joined the Nazi party. Yet Nazi educational policy changed both the curriculum and the views of students. The number of schools hours devoted to physical exercise, history, and geography increased, while those involving foreign languages and religion decreased. In 1939 essays written by students at the school reflected the new policies and referred frequently to works by Hitler and other Nazi leaders.

In 1971, the school began admitting girls and became co-educational.

== Notable alumni ==
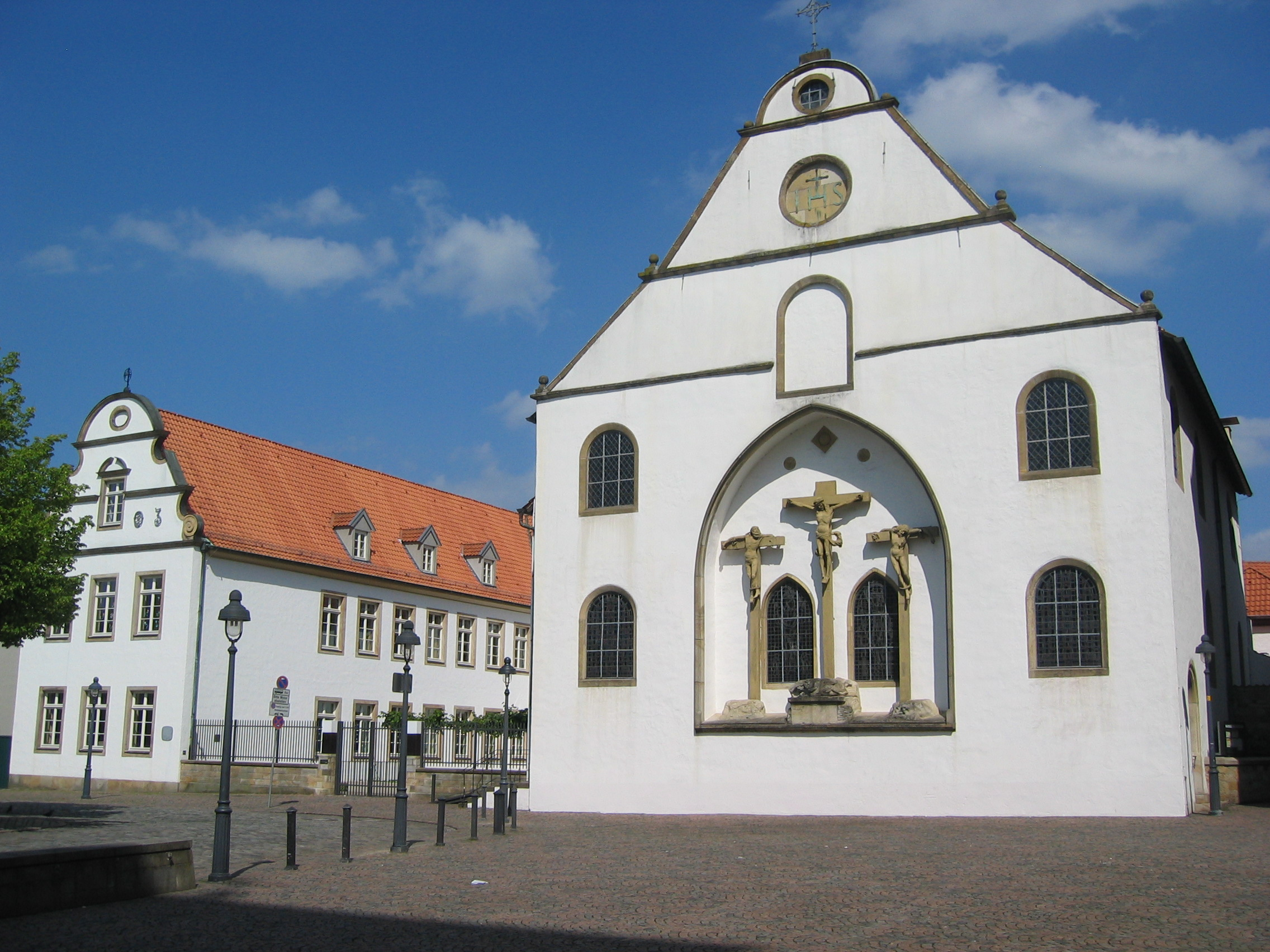
The Gymnasium Carolinum in Osnabrück

- Beate Baumann (born 1963), political advisor
- Hubertus Brandenburg, emeritus Roman Catholic Bishop of Stockholm.
- Karl Brandi, historian
- Michael F. Feldkamp, historian and journalist
- Joseph A. Hemann, educator, newspaper publisher, and banker.
- Adolf Lasson, philosophical writer.
- Levin Schücking, novelist
- Rudolf Seiters, politician from the CDU (Christian Democratic Union) party and former Vice President of the German Bundestag.
- Ludwig Windthorst, politician and justice minister.
- Timotheus Fleer, cook and philosopher

== See also ==
- List of Jesuit sites
- List of the oldest schools in the world
