= 803 Mopsuestia earthquake =

Coordinates: 36.957°N 35.621°E

The 803 Mopsuestia earthquake took place in the vicinity of Mopsuestia and the Gulf of Alexandretta (İskenderun) in 802 or 803 CE (Hijri year 187).

The main source for this earthquake is Al-Suyuti (15th century), who records both the earthquake and a related inundation of the Ceyhan River. He also records a seismic sea wave (tsunami) caused by the earthquake. Al-Suyuti omitted this earthquake in his work History of the Caliphs.

The earthquake is estimated to have taken place between 30 December, 802 and 19 December, 803.

== Notes ==
- Antonopoulos, J. (1980), Data from investigation of seismic Sea waves events in the Eastern Mediterranean from 500 to 1000 A.D., Annals of Geophysics
