= Bi Xian =

Bi Xian (Chinese: 畢諴; 802 – February 4, 864), courtesy name Cunzhi (存之), was an official of the Chinese dynasty Tang dynasty, who served as a chancellor during the reign of Emperor Yizong.

== Background ==
Bi Xian was born in 802, during the reign of Emperor Dezong. His family was originally from Yun Prefecture (鄆州, in modern Tai'an, Shandong) and originally claimed ancestry from Ji Gao (姬高), a son of King Wen of Zhou, who was created the Lord of Bi, although his traceable ancestry only went back to his fifth-generation ancestor, Bi Jing (畢憬), who served as a prefectural prefect during Tang dynasty. Bi Xian's grandfather Bi Jun (畢浚) served as a prefectural secretary general, while his father Bi Yun (畢勻) served as a musical scholar in the ministry of worship.

Bi Xian lost his father early in life, and was poor in his childhood. However, he was said to be diligent, and he studied by burning wood and reading by the fire. After he was grown, he was well-studied in the Confucian classics and the histories, but was particularly capable in writing poetry.

== During Emperors Wenzong's and Wuzong's reigns ==
Bi Xian passed the imperial examinations in the Jinshi class in the middle of the Taihe era (827–835) of Emperor Dezong's great-great-grandson Emperor Wenzong, and he later passed a special imperial examination for those who made good rulings. Thereafter, when the official Du Cong served as the military governor of Zhongwu Circuit (忠武, headquartered in modern Xuchang, Henan), Du invited Bi to serve as an assistant. When Du later served as the director of finances, Bi served as a traveling reviewer under him. Later, when Du served as the military governor of Huainan Circuit (淮南, headquartered in modern Yangzhou, Jiangsu), he continued to serve on Du's staff. When Du was recalled to the capital Chang'an to serve as chancellor in 844 by then-reigning Emperor Wuzong (Emperor Wenzong's younger brother), Bi returned to Chang'an as well and was made an imperial censor, initially with the title of Jiancha Yushi (監察御史), then as Shi Yushi (侍御史).

At that time, however, another chancellor, Li Deyu, was the leading figure at court, and Li did not get along with Du. In 845, Du was therefore sent out of Chang'an to serve as the military governor of Dongchuan Circuit (東川, headquartered in modern Mianyang, Sichuan). Because Du had offended Li, his former subordinates largely did not dare to send Du off, but Bi did. Li, hearing this, was displeased, and sent Bi out of the capital to serve as the prefect of Ci Prefecture (磁州, in modern Handan, Hebei).

== During Emperor Xuānzong's reign ==
After Emperor Wuzong died in 846 and was succeeded by his uncle Emperor Xuānzong, Li Deyu lost power, and many of those whom Li had demoted were promoted. Bi Xian was thereafter made Hubu Yuanwailang (戶部員外郎), a low-level official at the ministry of census (戶部, Hubu), with his office at the eastern capital Luoyang. He was then recalled to Chang'an to serve as Jiabu Yuanwailang (駕部員外郎), a low-level official at the ministry of defense (兵部, Bingbu) in charge of imperial messengers' horses and wagons, and then as Cangbu Langzhong (倉部郎中), a supervisory official at the ministry of census in charge of imperial money and food storages. During those times, the Jiabu and Cangbu assignments were not considered honored assignments, and officials who were from prominent clans would be displeased if assigned to them, but Bi accepted them happily and respectfully, impressing the chancellors who assigned him. He was thereafter made Zhifang Langzhong (職方郎中), a supervisory official at the ministry of defense in charge of military maps, as well as supervisory censor (侍御史知雜, Shi Yushi Zhiza). He was soon made an imperial scholar (翰林學士, Hanlin Xueshi) and Zhongshu Sheren (中書舍人), a mid-level official at the legislative bureau of government (中書省, Zhongshu Sheng).

As of 852, Emperor Xuānzong had to deal with frequent Dangxiang incursions on the northwest borders, and he was hoping to find a suitable military governor (jiedushi) for Binning Circuit (邠寧, headquartered in modern Xianyang, Shaanxi), but could not find one. On one occasion, when he discussed with Bi what proper border policies should be, Bi discussed the history and listed a number of suggestions that he had. Emperor Xuānzong was impressed, compared him to the prominent Zhao generals Lian Po and Li Mu, and asked him whether he would be willing to accept the Binning assignment. Bi agreed cheerfully. Emperor Xuānzong, in order to increase his prominence before sending him out on assignment, first made him the deputy minister of defense (兵部侍郎, Bingbu Shilang), then made him the military governor of Binning. Later that year, he reported that the Dangxiang troubling Binning had all been pacified. That allowed Binning's headquarters, which had been temporarily moved from Bin Prefecture (邠州) to Ning Prefecture (寧州, in modern Qingyang, Gansu) due to the Dangxiang incursions, to be returned to Bin Prefecture in spring 855. It was said that while at Binning, Bi encouraged the soldiers to tend the fields and grow crops for the military food supplies, allowing them to be supplied adequately at a reduced cost to the imperial treasury. He was later transferred to Zhaoyi Circuit (昭義, headquartered in modern Changzhi, Shanxi) and then Hedong Circuit (河東, headquartered in modern Taiyuan, Shanxi). As Hedong was on the border, Bi established 70 watch posts to defend against attacks. However, while it was said that Emperor Xuānzong had previously promised him that he would be recalled to serve as chancellor, then-lead chancellor Linghu Tao was fearful of him, and therefore he was never recalled during that timespan.

== During Emperor Yizong's reign ==
Emperor Xuānzong died in 859 and was succeeded by his son Emperor Yizong. Thereafter, Bi Xian was transferred to Xuanwu Circuit (宣武, headquartered in modern Kaifeng, Henan), and yet later recalled to Chang'an to serve as the minister of census (戶部尚書, Hubu Shangshu) as well as the director of finances. In 860, Emperor Yizong made him the minister of rites (禮部尚書, Libu Shangshu) and gave him the designation Tong Zhongshu Menxia Pingzhangshi (同中書門下平章事), making him a chancellor de facto. As chancellor, he was said to be a capable administrator and talented in his writing. He served as a chancellor until 863, when he resigned his chancellor post, ostensibly due to illness, but was said to have actually resigned because he was unhappy that his chancellor colleagues did not uphold the law properly. He was thereafter made the minister of defense (兵部尚書, Bingbu Shangshu). He was thereafter made the military governor of Hezhong Circuit (河中, headquartered in modern Yuncheng, Shanxi), and died two months later, in early 864.

== Notes and references ==
- Old Book of Tang, vol. 177.
- New Book of Tang, vol. 183.
- Zizhi Tongjian, vols. 249, 250.
