= Hugh (abbot of Saint-Quentin) =

Frankish monk, son of Charlemagne (802–844)

Hugh or Hugo (802–844) was the illegitimate son of Charlemagne and his concubine Regina, with whom he had one other son: Bishop Drogo of Metz (801–855). Along with Drogo and his illegitimate half-brother Theodoric, Hugh was tonsured and sent from the palace of Aachen to a monastery in 818 by his father's successor, Louis the Pious, following the revolt of King Bernard of Italy. Hugh rose to become abbot of several abbacies: Saint-Quentin (822/23), Lobbes (836), and Saint-Bertin (836). In 834, he was made imperial archchancellor by his half-brother.

On Louis's death in 840, his sons began to fight over the inheritance. In 841, Hugh sided with his nephew Charles the Bald against Louis and Lothair. In 842, Charles spent Christmas with Hugh at Saint-Quentin on his eastern frontier. Hugh's interventions probably secured Saint-Quentin for Charles's kingdom in the division that came with the Treaty of Verdun (843).

Hugh was part of the small army which, on its way south to join Charles at Toulouse, was ambushed by Pippin II in the Angoumois on 14 June 844. Hugh was killed by a lance, and according to the anonymous verse lament composed about his death—called the Rhythmus de obitu Hugonis abbatis or Planctus Ugoni abbatis—Pippin wept over his body.

== Sources ==
- McKitterick, Rosamond (1983). The Frankish Kingdoms under the Carolingians, 751–987. London: Longman.
- Nelson, J. L. (1992). Charles the Bald. London: Longman.
