= Gartnait II =

King of the Picts from 584 to 595

Garnait II

King of the Picts
- Reign: 584–595
- Predecessor: Bridei I
- Successor: Nechtan II
- Died: 595
- Mother: Domelch

Gartnait, son of Domelch, (died 595) was a king of the Picts from 584 to 595.

The Pictish Chronicle king lists contained in the Poppleton Manuscript have Gartnait following Bridei I whose death c. 586 is recorded by the Irish annals. Death of Gartnait II is noted in the Annals of Tigernach c. 599 and the king lists have him succeeded by Nechtan nepos Uerb.

Some versions of the king list associate Gartnait with the foundation of the monastery of Abernethy, although other variants associate this either with Nechtan nepos Uerb or the similarly named pre-historic king Nechtan son of Erp.

John Bannerman proposed that this Gartnait was to be identified with the son of Áedán mac Gabráin found in the genealogies known as Cethri Primchenela dail Riata attached to the Senchus fer n-Alban, and furthermore with the Gartnait whose kin were active on the isle of Skye during the 7th and early 8th centuries. T. F. O'Rahilly had earlier rejected the identification of "Gartnait son of Áedán" with the eponym of the Skye kindred who is called Gartnait son of Accidán in the Irish annals. The most recent study, by Fraser, rejects the existence of Gartnait son of Áedán outright, presuming this person to have been a genealogical fiction created in the early 8th century to bolster the ambitions of Cenél nGartnait, descendants of Gartnait son of Accidán, to rule in Kintyre. Instead, due to the Picts being prone to practice matrilineal succession, his true parentage was indeed Domelch, who was probably a sister or daughter of his predecessor, King Uradech.

== Sources ==
- Anderson, Alan Orr (1990), Early Sources of Scottish History A.D. 500–1286, vol. I (2nd ed.), Stamford: Paul Watkins, ISBN 1-871615-03-8
- Anderson, M. O. (1980), Kings and Kingship in Early Scotland (2nd ed.), Edinburgh: Scottish Academic Press, ISBN 0-7011-1604-8
- Bannerman, John (1974), Studies in the History of Dalriada, Edinburgh: Scottish Academic Press, ISBN 0-7011-2040-1
- Charles-Edwards, T. M. (2006). The Chronicle of Ireland. Translated Texts for Historians. Vol. 44. Liverpool: Liverpool University Press. ISBN 0-85323-959-2.
- Evans, Nicholas (2008), "Royal succession and kingship among the Picts", The Innes Review, 59 (1), Edinburgh: Edinburgh University Press: 1–48, doi:10.3366/e0020157x08000140, hdl:20.500.11820/657d2747-c29d-4254-989d-eb23970a9684, ISSN 0020-157X
- Fraser, James E. (2009). From Caledonia to Pictland: Scotland to 795. New Edinburgh History of Scotland. Vol. I. Edinburgh University Press. ISBN 978-0-7486-1232-1.
- Smyth, Alfred P. (1989). Warlords and Holy Men: Scotland A.D. 80–1000. Edinburgh University Press. ISBN 0-7486-0100-7.

Regnal titles
Preceded by Bridei I	King of the Picts; 584–595	Succeeded by Nechtan II
