= Drest =

Drest (also Drust and the hypocoristic Drostan) is the name of several Pictish people, including:

- Drest I, Drest son of Erp, supposedly contemporary with Saint Patrick
- Drest Gurthinmoch (Drest II)
- Drest III, Drest son of Uudrost
- Drest IV, Drest son of Girom
- Drest V, Drest son of Munait
- Drest son of Donuel (Drest VI), deposed 672
- Drest VII, killed 729
- Drest VIII, Drest son of Talorgan, died 787 ?
- Drust IX, Drest son of Caustantín, died 836 or 837 ?
- Drest X, Drest son of Ferat, fl. 840s
- Saint Drostan, founder of the monastery at Old Deer, fl. early 7th century
