= Galam Cennalath =

King of the Picts from 550 to 555

King of the Picts
- Reign: 550–555
- Predecessor: Drest V
- Successor: Bridei I
- Died: 580

Galam Cennalath (died 580) was a king of the Picts from 550 to 555.

The Pictish Chronicle king lists have him reign for between two and four years, with one year being jointly with Bridei son of Maelchon according to some versions. Some variants place his reign between Gartnait I and Drest IV which may be a copyist's error, or alternatively, he may have had two reigns. Keith Coleman suggests that he was a king of southern Pictland.

The death of "Cennalath, King of the Picts" is reported by the Annals of Ulster and the Annals of Tigernach for 580.

== Sources ==
- Anderson, Alan Orr; Early Sources of Scottish History A.D. 500–1286, volume 1. Reprinted with corrections, Paul Watkins, Stamford, 1990. ISBN 1-871615-03-8

Regnal titles
Preceded by Drest V	King of the Picts; 550–555	Succeeded by Bridei I
