= Causantín mac Fergusa =

King of the Picts from 789 to 820

Caustantin mac Fergusa

King of the Picts
- Reign: 789–820
- Predecessor: Conall
- Successor: Óengus II
- Died: 820
- House: Óengus
- Father: Fergusa

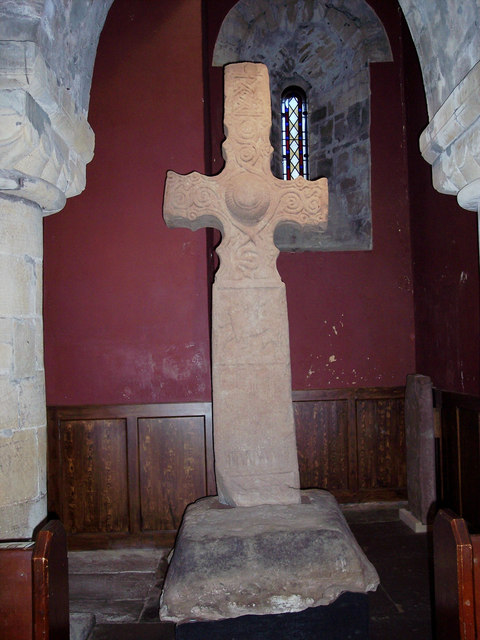
Dupplin Cross, now in St Serf's Church, Dunning, on which Causantín mac Fergusa is commemorated as Custantin filius Fircus[sa]

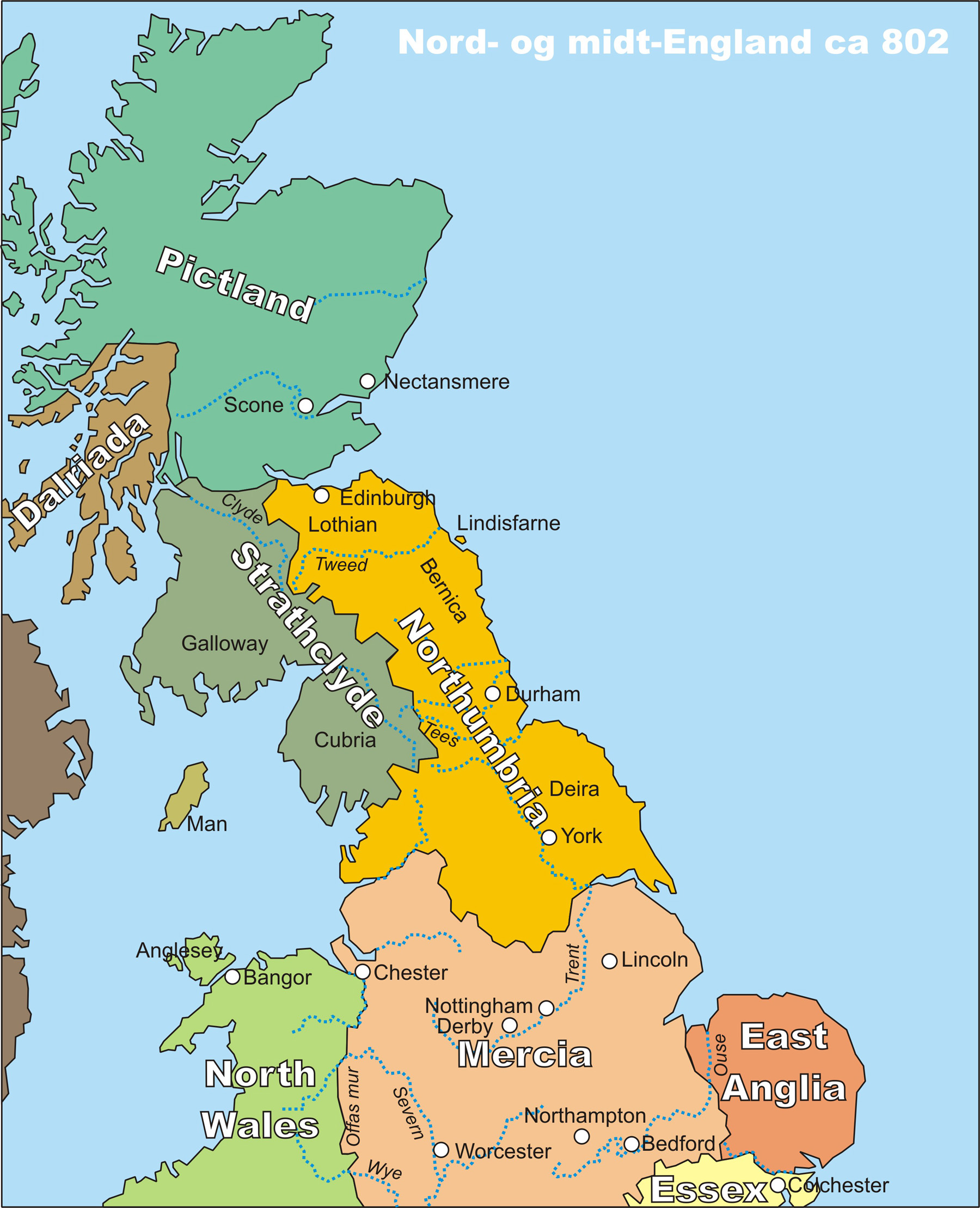
Great Britain during the reign of Causantín mac Fergusa (A.D. 802); Pictland is green

Causantín or Constantín mac Fergusa (English: "Constantine son of Fergus") (789–820) was king of the Picts, in modern Scotland, from 789 until 820. He was until the Victorian era sometimes counted as Constantine I of Scotland; the title is now generally given to Causantín mac Cináeda. He is credited with having founded the church at Dunkeld which later received relics of St Columba from Iona.

== Life ==
It had been proposed that Causantín and his brother Óengus were sons of Fergus mac Echdach, King of Dál Riata, but this is no longer widely accepted. Instead, it is thought they were kin to the first king Óengus mac Fergusa, perhaps grandsons or grandnephews. This family may have originated in Circin (presumed to correspond with the modern Mearns) and had ties to the Eóganachta of Munster in Ireland.

Causantín's reign falls in a period when Irish annals have relatively few notices of events in Scotland, possibly due to the failing of the annals believed to have been kept in Scotland at Iona and Applecross. Perhaps for that reason, there are only two reports which mention him. Other entries make it clear that the Vikings were active in Ireland and on the western coasts of Scotland at this time, which may also account for the lack of records. Iona was a target, and it may be that Abbot Noah of Kingarth, on the Isle of Bute, was killed by raiders.

The first report, in 789, is the record of a battle in Pictland between Causantín and Conall mac Taidg, in which Causantín was victorious. Conall later reappears in Kintyre, where was killed in 807. It is not known whether Causantín was king before defeating Conall. The king lists give varying lengths for his reign, from 35 to 45 years, and are not to be relied upon without independent confirmation. The second report is that of Causantín's death in 820.

The Dupplin Cross was long assumed to commemorate Cináed mac Ailpín's final victory over the Picts, as indeed, was Sueno's Stone. Recent analysis has revealed a small part of an inscription on the Cross, in which Causantín is named. Accordingly, it is supposed that this monument was commissioned by him, or as a memorial to him. He appears there as Custantin filius Fircus[sa], a latinisation derived from the Old Irish version of his name rather than the presumed Pictish form Castantin filius Uurguist found in the Poppleton manuscript and similar Pictish king lists.

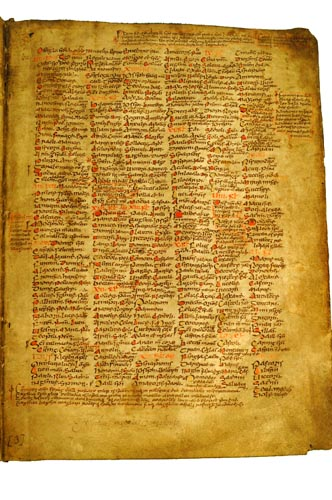
Martyrology of Tallaght (University College Dublin Ms. A3) from the Book of Leinster, c. 1180

It has been proposed that the St Andrews Sarcophagus was made for Causantín, but this is a minority view, as is the suggestion that the relics of St Columba, perhaps including the Monymusk Reliquary, may have been translated from Iona to Dunkeld during Causantín's reign. The idea that Columba's relics may have come to Dunkeld in the time of Causantín, rather than thirty years later in the time of Cináed mac Ailpín is based on an entry in the Chronicon Scotorum for 818.

That Causantín established Dunkeld is stated by later chroniclers such as John of Fordun who are following some variants of the Pictish king lists or other materials now lost. Andrew of Wyntoun dates the foundation to 815, although he states that this was after the deaths of Charlemagne and Pope Leo III, which would date it to 816 or later. It is suggested that Causantín is commemorated by the Martyrology of Tallaght, a product of one of the principal céli dé monasteries of the day. As a patron of the céli dé, and perhaps a collaborator of Abbot Diarmait of Iona, it is thought that Causantín may have been a church reformer, in line with céli dé ideals. Caustantín appears also to have been a patron of the Northumbrian monasteries, as he is commemorated, along with his nephew Eogán, in the Liber Vitae Dunelmensis, which contains a list of those for whom prayers were said, dating from around 840.

Causantín was succeeded by his brother Óengus. His son Drest was later king. Causantín's son Domnall is believed to have been king of Dál Riata from around 811 until 835. Causantín's reputation among the kings who followed him may, perhaps, be demonstrated by the use of his name for three kings in the century and a half following his death when it is not attested as a kingly name in Scotland prior to his reign.

== Family ==
While Causantín'a parentage is not known with certainty, it is believed that he had two siblings: A brother Óengus, who succeeded him as King of the Picts, and a sister who is said to be his heir and was the mother of Alpín mac Echdach, founder of the Alpín dynasty, from which centuries of Scottish rulers descended.

Causantín is believed to have fathered at least 2 sons:

- Drest IX;
- Domnall.

== See also ==
- House of Óengus

== Sources ==
- Anderson, Alan Orr; Early Sources of Scottish History A.D. 500–1286, volume 1. Reprinted with corrections, Stamford: Paul Watkins, 1990. ISBN 1-871615-03-8
- Bannerman, John; "The Scottish Takeover of Pictland and the relics of Columba" in Dauvit Broun and Thomas Owen Clancy (eds.) Spes Scotorum: Saint Columba, Iona and Scotland, Edinburgh: T & T Clark, 1999. ISBN 0-567-08682-8
- Broun, Dauvit; "Dunkeld and the origins of Scottish Identity" in Dauvit Broun and Thomas Owen Clancy (eds), op. cit.
- Broun, Dauvit; "Pictish Kings 761–839: Integration with Dál Riata or Separate Development" in Sally Foster (ed.), The St Andrews Sarcophagus: A Pictish masterpiece and its international connections, Dublin: Four Courts Press, 1998. ISBN 1-85182-414-6
- Clancy, Thomas Owen; "Caustantín son of Fergus (Uurgust)" in M. Lynch (ed.) The Oxford Companion to Scottish History, Oxford and New York: Oxford UP, 2002. ISBN 0-19-211696-7
- John of Fordun; Chronicle of the Scottish Nation, ed. William Forbes Skene, tr. Felix J. H. Skene, 2 vols. Reprinted, Lampeter: Llanerch Press, 1993. ISBN 1-897853-05-X
- Forsyth, Katherine; "Evidence of a lost Pictish source in the Historia Regum Anglorum of Symeon of Durham", in Simon Taylor (ed.) Kings, clerics and chronicles in Scotland, 500-1297: essays in honour of Marjorie Ogilvie Anderson on the occasion of her ninetieth birthday, Dublin: Four Courts Press, 2000. ISBN 1-85182-516-9
- Foster, Sally M.; Picts, Gaels and Scots: Early Historic Scotland, London: Batsford. ISBN 0-7134-8874-3
- Smyth, Alfred P.; Warlords and Holy Men: Scotland A.D. 80–1000, Reprinted, Edinburgh: Edinburgh University Press, 1998. ISBN 0-7486-0100-7

Regnal titles
Preceded by Conall	King of the Picts; 789–820	Succeeded by Óengus II
