= Óengus II =

King of the Picts from 820 to 834

Óengus mac Fergusa

King of the Picts
- Reign: 820–834
- Predecessor: Caustantín
- Successor: Drest IX
- Died: 834
- Father: Fergusa

Óengus mac Fergusa (Angus MacFergus; Irish Onuist, Latinised Hungus) was king of the Picts from 820 until 834. In Scottish historiography, he is associated with the veneration of Saint Andrew, the patron saint of Scotland, although this has not been proven.

== Life ==
Óengus succeeded his brother Caustantín to the throne. Previously thought to have been of Dál Riatan origin and descended from Fergus mac Echdach, their family is now assumed to have been that of the first king Óengus mac Fergusa, perhaps originating in Circin (presumed to correspond with the modern Mearns), a Pictish family with ties to the Eóganachta of Munster in Ireland.

Óengus, along with his brother, son Eogán, and nephew Domnall, is included in the Duan Albanach, a praise poem from the reign of Máel Coluim (III) mac Donnchada listing Máel Coluim's predecessors as kings of Scots, of Alba and of Dál Riata from Fergus Mór and his brothers onwards. The inclusion of Pictish kings from Caustantín to Eogán in the Duan led to the supposition that Dál Riata was ruled by Pictish kings, or rather that Dál Riata kings ruled Pictland, leading to supposition that the origins of the Kingdom of Alba lay in a Gaelic conquest of Pictland. However, it is now suggested that their inclusion is due to their importance in the religious communities of Dunkeld and St Andrews, where they were seen as founders and early patrons. However, a modern reconstruction of the later lists of Dál Riata kings presumes that Óengus's nephew Domnall was king of Dál Riata during this time (approximately 811–835).

Óengus died in 834, the only event of his reign reported in the Irish annals and was succeeded by his nephew Drest mac Caustantín. Óengus's son Eogán was later king and was killed with his brother Bran in a battle against Vikings in 839.

== Association with Saint Andrew ==
Walter Bower in his Scotichronicon (1440s) supplies a legend according to which Saint Andrew appears to Óengus II in 832, on the eve of a battle against the Angles. The saint advises the king to watch for the "sign of the Cross of Christ in the air". Bower's account has precedents in earlier chroniclers John of Fordun (IV, xiii-xiv) and Andrew of Wyntoun. A still earlier reference of the 12th century simply states that "King Hungus" won a victory aided by Saint Andrew, in gratitude for which the Picts agreed to venerate the Saint. Skene, in his notes to Fordun IV, xiii-xiv, states that the episode is placed in the 4th century, making the entire tale anachronistic in the extreme. The three kings whom the legend has been tied to are Athelstan of England and Athelstan of East Anglia, as well as Guthrum the Old (whose baptismal name was Athelstan).

The "Cross of Christ" vision in Bower's account (itself a reminiscence of the Milvian Bridge episode) is turned into the white on blue Saltire in the narrative by George Buchanan (1506–1582), who has such a saltire appear in the sky in the form of a cloud formation during the battle.

The religious site at St Andrews, originally Cennrígmonaid, long predates this Óengus. Túathalán, first known Abbot of Cennrígmonaid, died in 747, and it is thought likely that the establishment is due to the earlier Óengus (king from 729; died 761) or to Nechtan mac Der-Ilei (king 706–724 and ?728–729; died 732). The St Andrews Sarcophagus is assumed to have been made for the remains of Nechtan or the first Óengus. The later St Andrews tradition recounting the supposed arrival of Saint Regulus (or Saint Rule) at St Andrews, with relics of St Andrew, has him met at Forteviot by three sons of Óengus: Eogán, Nechtan and Finguine.

== See also ==
- House of Óengus

== Sources ==
- Anderson, Alan Orr; Early Sources of Scottish History A.D. 500–1286, volume 1. Reprinted with corrections, Stamford: Paul Watkins, 1990. ISBN 1-871615-03-8
- Bannerman, John; "The Scottish Takeover of Pictland and the relics of Columba" in Dauvit Broun and Thomas Owen Clancy (eds.) Spes Scotorum: Saint Columba, Iona and Scotland, Edinburgh: T & T Clark, 1999 ISBN 0-567-08682-8
- Dauvit Broun; "Dunkeld and the origins of Scottish Identity" in Dauvit Broun and Thomas Owen Clancy (eds), op. cit.
- Broun, Dauvit; "Pictish Kings 761-839: Integration with Dál Riata or Separate Development" in Sally Foster (ed.), The St Andrews Sarcophagus: A Pictish masterpiece and its international connections, Dublin: Four Courts Press, 1998. ISBN 1-85182-414-6
- Broun, Dauvit; "The church of St Andrews and its foundation legend in the early twelfth century" in Simon Taylor (ed.) Kings, clerics and chronicles in Scotland, 500–1297: essays in honour of Marjorie Ogilvie Anderson on the occasion of her ninetieth birthday, Dublin: Four Courts Press, 2000. ISBN 1-85182-516-9
- Clancy, Thomas Owen; "Caustantín son of Fergus (Uurgust)" in M. Lynch (ed.), The Oxford Companion to Scottish History, Oxford and New York: Oxford University Press, 2002. ISBN 0-19-211696-7
- John of Fordun; Chronicle of the Scottish Nation, ed. William Forbes Skene, tr. Felix J. H. Skene, 2 vols. Reprinted, Lampeter: Llanerch Press, 1993. ISBN 1-897853-05-X
- Foster, Sally M.; Picts, Gaels and Scots: Early Historic Scotland, London: Batsford, ISBN 0-7134-8874-3
- Henderson, Isabel; "Primus inter Pares: the St Andrews Sarcophagus and Pictish Sculpture" in Simon Taylor (ed.) op. cit.
- Smyth, Alfred P.; Warlords and Holy Men: Scotland AD 80–1000, Reprinted, Edinburgh: Edinburgh UP, 1998. ISBN 0-7486-0100-7

Regnal titles
| Preceded by Caustantín | King of the Picts; 775–778 | Succeeded by Drest IX |
