= Talorg =

Talorg or Talorc is a masculine given name which may refer to:

- Talorc mac Achiuir (reigned 387–412), first known king of Picts
- Talorc I of the Picts (reigned 452–456), King of the Picts
- Talorc II (reigned 538–549), King of the Picts
- Talorg son of Uuid (died 653), King of the Picts
- Talorc IV (died 837), or Talorcan son of Wthoil, King of the Picts

== See also ==
- Talorgan or Talorcan, another given name
