= Cinioch =

King of the Picts from 616 to 631

King of the Picts
- Reign: 616–631
- Predecessor: Nechtan nepos Uerb
- Successor: Gartnait III
- Father: Lutrin

Cinioch, named Cínaed mac Luchtren or Ciniod I, in the Irish Annals, was king of the Picts, in modern Scotland, from circa 616 to 631, when his death is reported in the Annals of Ulster, the Annals of Tigernach and the Chronicon Scotorum.

According to the Pictish Chronicle king lists, he reigned for 14 or 19 years and was followed by Gartnait III.

== Sources ==
- Anderson, Alan Orr; Early Sources of Scottish History A.D. 500–1286, volume 1. Reprinted with corrections, Paul Watkins, Stamford, 1990. ISBN 1-871615-03-8

Regnal titles
Preceded by Nechtan II	King of the Picts; 616–631	Succeeded by Gartnait III
