= Conall mac Taidg =

King of the Picts from 785 to 789

King of the Picts
- Reign: 785–789
- Predecessor: Talorc III, son of Oengus I
- Successor: Caustantin
- Died: 807
- Father: Taidg

Conall mac Taidg (died c. 807) was a king of the Picts from 785 until 789. Very little is recorded of the king. He is mentioned twice by the Irish annals, the most reliable source for the history of Northern Britain in the years around 800. He also appears in later regnal lists.

== Annals ==
The Chronicle of Ireland survives only in later manuscripts. Of these, the Annals of Ulster contain two reports of mac Taidg. The first, dated to 789, records "a battle between the Picts, in which Conall son of Tadc was defeated and escaped; and Constantín was victor". Constantín here is Caustantín mac Fergusa (d. 820), king of Fortriu. The second report notes in 807 "the killing of Conall son of Tadc, by Conall son of Aedacán in Cenn Tíre". Cenn Tíre is the Old Irish-language form of the Kintyre peninsula, and Conall son of Aedacán is usually called Conall mac Áedáin.

== Lists of Kings ==
Later evidence of Connall mac Taidg's life is provided by regnal lists and by Irish historical writings. The earliest of these may have been compiled during the ninth century not long after his reign, but none survives a manuscript of that date. A list of synchronisms – a series of known, dateable events used to align Irish lists of kings to Scottish ones – was attributed to Irish writer Flann Mainistrech in the eleventh century and provides another list of kings. Two manuscripts of Flann's work state that there were "sixteen kings in Scotland" between the death of Áed Allán (d. 743) and the death of Áed Findliath (d. 789). The sixteen begin with Dúngal mac Selbaig and end with Kenneth MacAlpin. Two kings named Conall, "Conall Coem, and another Conall, his brother", are said to have reigned between Domnall mac Caustantín in the early ninth century, and his father, Caustantín mac Fergusa, the man who had defeated Conall in 789. The Duan Albanach, dated on internal evidence to rather later in the eleventh century, follows this by having Domnall mac Caustantín followed by two Conalls and then Caustantín. It is generally assumed that the Duan and Flann aim to report the succession of kings in Dál Riata.

Conall is not included in any surviving genealogical material, but this is typical for the period. The Poppleton Manuscript's Pictish king list includes a king named Canaul son of Tarla'ason of Tang in some versions but simply omitted from others. This Canaul has generally been identified with Conall. The lists assign a reign of five years to this king who precedes Caustantín mac Fergusa.

== King of Picts or Dál Riata? ==
Interpretations of Conall mac Taidg's life are determined largely by the shifting views of historians with regard to Caustantín mac Fergusa and the later origins of the Kingdom of Alba, a subject where the consensus may have changed recently, having previously been stable since the time of William Forbes Skene. Skene made Conall a king of the Picts, while later reinterpretations made him first a king of the Picts, then, following his expulsion by Caustantín, a king of Dál Riata. Recent reinterpretations make him a king in Argyll throughout, but not necessarily the chief king.

== Sources ==
- Anderson, Alan Orr (1922), Early Sources of Scottish History A.D. 500–1286, vol. I (1990 revised and corrected ed.), Stamford: Paul Watkins, ISBN 1-871615-03-8
- Anderson, M. O. (1980) [1973], Kings and Kingship in Early Scotland (2nd ed.), Edinburgh: Scottish Academic Press, ISBN 0-7011-1604-8
- Bannerman, John (1999), "The Scottish Takeover of Pictland and the relics of Columba", in Broun, Dauvit; Clancy, Thomas Owen (eds.), Spes Scotorum: Hope of Scots. Saint Columba, Iona and Scotland, Edinburgh: T. & T. Clark, pp. 71–94, ISBN 0-567-08682-8
- Broun, Dauvit; "Pictish Kings 761–839: Integration with Dál Riata or Separate Development" in Sally M. Foster (ed.), The St Andrews Sarcophagus: A Pictish masterpiece and its international connections, Four Courts, Dublin, 1998. ISBN 1-85182-414-6
- Clancy, Thomas Owen; "Iona in the kingdom of the Picts: a note" in The Innes Review, volume 55, number 1, 2004, pp. 73–76. ISSN 0020-157X
- Woolf, Alex (2007), From Pictland to Alba, 789–1070, The New Edinburgh History of Scotland, Edinburgh: Edinburgh University Press, ISBN 978-0-7486-1234-5

Regnal titles
Preceded by Talorc III	King of the Picts; 785–789	Succeeded by Caustantin
