= Drest III =

King of the Picts from 522 to 530

King of the Picts
- Reign: 522–530
- Predecessor: Galan Erilich
- Successor: Drest IV
- Father: Uudrost

Drest son of Uudrost or son of Uudrossig was a king of the Picts from 522 to 530.

The Pictish Chronicle king lists associate him with Drest IV. Various reigns, separately and jointly, are assigned to the two Drests, varying from one to fifteen years. W.A. Cummins argues that the two Drests were kings of the southern Picts while Bridei son of Maelchon ruled in the north.

== Sources ==
- Anderson, Alan Orr; Early Sources of Scottish History A.D. 500–1286, volume 1. Reprinted with corrections, Paul Watkins, Stamford, 1990. ISBN 1-871615-03-8

Regnal titles
Preceded by Galan Erilich	King of the Picts; 522–530; With: Drest IV	Succeeded by Gartnait I
