= Talorg son of Uuid =

King of the Picts from 641 to 653

King of the Picts
- Reign: 641–653
- Predecessor: Bridei son of Uuid
- Successor: Talorgan I
- Died: 653
- Father: Uuid

Talorg son of Uuid (Old Irish: Talorc mac Foith; died 653) was a king of the Picts from 641 to 653.

The Pictish Chronicle give him a reign of eleven or twelve years following his brother Bridei son of Uuid. A third brother, Gartnait son of Uuid, was king before Bridei, and some versions of the king lists have Talorg succeeding Gartnait directly. The three sons of Uuid were probably based in the southern Pictish territories south of the Mounth, and between them, they ruled continuously from 631 to 653.

Uuid, father of Talorg, may be the same person as the Gwid son of Peithan recorded in the Welsh poem Y Gododdin as a leader allied with the northern Britons fighting against the Angles of Northumbria in the early 7th century. Gwid could have been either a Pictish ally of the Gododdin or a related northern British chief. His name may originally have read "Gwid son of Neithan", suggesting that he was the son of Neithon son of Guipno, king of the British kingdom of Altclut, who may, in turn, be the same person as the Nechtan grandson of Uerb recorded as king of the Picts from 595 to around 616. This theory, which is highly credible chronologically, would make Talorg and his brothers grandsons of Neithan and first cousins of both the later Pictish king Bridei son of Beli and the later king of Altclut Eugein.

Talorg's death is reported by the Annals of Ulster and the Annals of Tigernach for 653. He was succeeded by Talorgan son of Eanfrith, whose name is a diminutive meaning "Little Talorg", suggesting that Talorg and Talorgan were closely related, with Talorgan's mother possibly being Talorg's sister.

== Sources ==
- Anderson, Alan Orr; Early Sources of Scottish History A.D. 500–1286, volume 1. Reprinted with corrections, Paul Watkins, Stamford, 1990. ISBN 1-871615-03-8
- Calise, J. M. P. (2002). "Personal Names Associated with the Picts: Biographical and Textual Notes". Pictish Sourcebook: Documents of Medieval Legend and Dark Age History. Westport, CT: Greenwood Publishing Group. pp. 171–261. ISBN 9780313322952.
- Clarkson, Tim (2016). The Picts: A History. Edinburgh: Birlinn. ISBN 9781780274034.
- Fraser, James E. (2009). From Caledonia to Pictland: Scotland to 795. New Edinburgh History of Scotland. Edinburgh: Edinburgh University Press. ISBN 9780748612321.
- Smyth, Alfred P. (1989). Warlords and Holy Men: Scotland, A.D. 80–1000. New History of Scotland. Edinburgh: Edinburgh University Press. ISBN 9780748601004.

Regnal titles
Preceded by Bridei II	King of the Picts; 641–653	Succeeded by Talorgan I
