= Bridei I =

King of the Picts from 554 to 584

King of the Picts
- Reign: 554–584
- Predecessor: Galam Cennalath
- Successor: Gartnait II
- Died: c. 586
- Father: Maelchon (feasibly Maelgwn Gwynedd)
- Religion: Christian (unconfirmed).

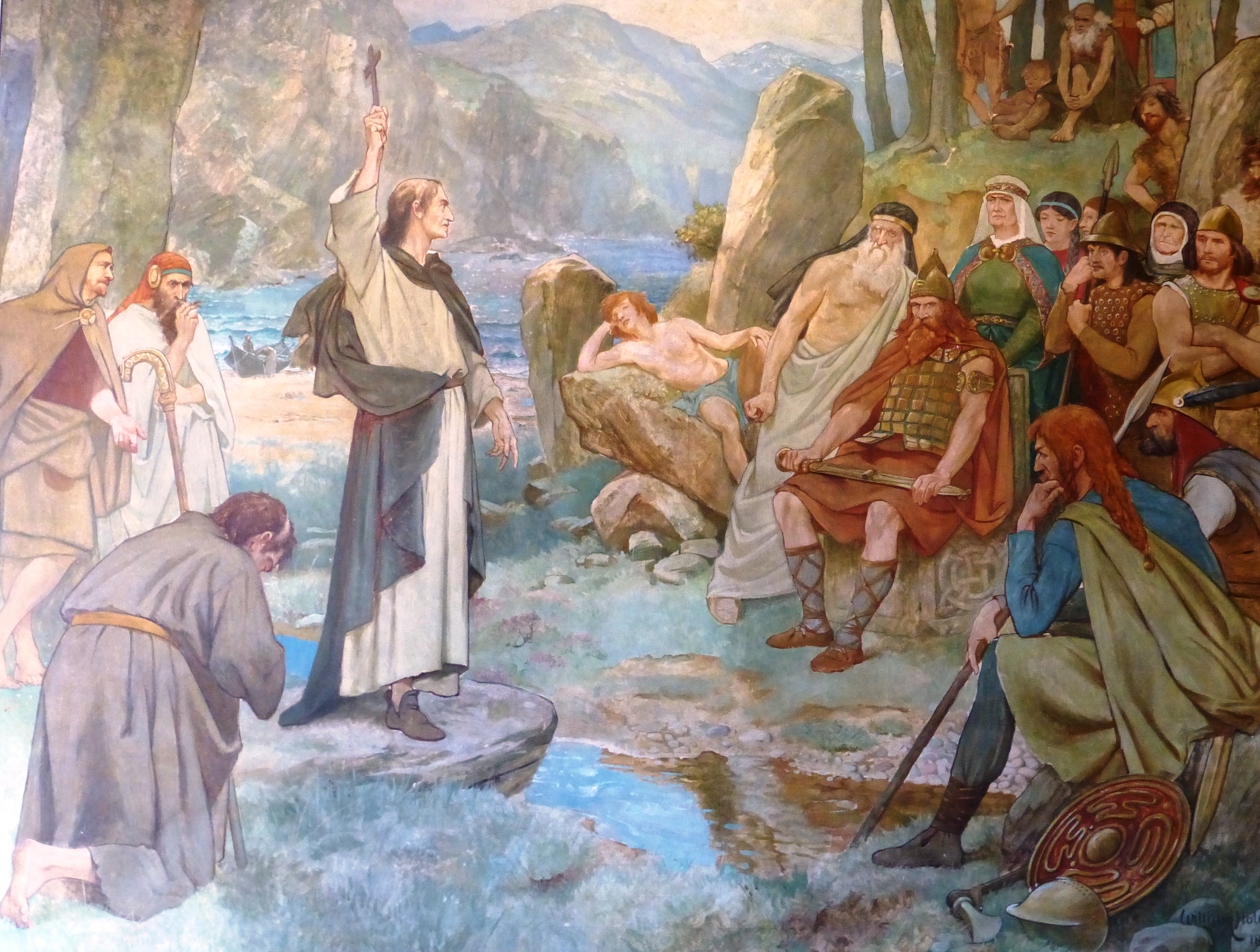
Nineteenth century illustration of Saint Columba's conversion of King Bridei, by William Hole

Bridei son of Maelchon (died c. 586) was King of the Picts from 554 to 584. Sources are vague or contradictory regarding him, but it is believed that his court was near Loch Ness and that he may have been a Christian. Several contemporaries also claimed the title "King of the Picts". He died in the mid-580s, possibly in battle, and was succeeded by Gartnait son of Domelch.

== Historical sources ==
Bridei son of Maelchon was King of the Picts until his death around A.D. 584–586. Other forms of his name include Brude son of Melcho and, in Irish sources, Bruide son of Maelchú and Bruidhe son of Maelchon. He was first mentioned in the Irish annals from 558 to 560, where the Annals of Ulster report "the migration before Máelchú's son, King Bruide". An earlier entry, reporting the death of "Bruide son of Máelchú" in the Annals of Ulster for 505 is presumed to be an error. The Ulster annalist does not say who fled, but the later Annals of Tigernach refers to "the flight of the Scots before Bruide son of Máelchú" in 558. This uncertainty has provoked considerable speculation; in one version the Annals of Ulster is said to associate this with the death of Gabrán mac Domangairt.

== Personal life ==
Bridei is suggested to have been the son of Maelgwn Gwynedd by John Morris in his The Age of Arthur, where he is referred to in passing as "... Bridei, son of Maelgwn, the mighty king of north Wales, ...". Though the book has been a commercial success, it is disparaged by historians as an unreliable source of "misleading and misguided" information.

Bridei's death was reported in the 580s, perhaps in battle against Pictish rivals in Circinn, an area thought to correspond with the Mearns. The lists of kings in the Pictish Chronicle agree that Bridei was followed by Gartnait son of Domelch (Garnait II).

== Political life ==
Bridei appears in Adomnán's Life of Saint Columba as a contemporary and as one of the chief kings in Scotland. Adomnán's account of Bridei is problematic as it does not mention whether Bridei was already a Christian, and if not, whether Columba converted him. The archaeological discoveries at Portmahomack, showing that there was a monastic community there from around 550, provide some support for the idea that Bridei was either already a Christian, at least in name, or was converted by Columba.

Bridei was not the only "king of the Picts" during his lifetime. The death of Galam Cennalath — called "Cennalath, king of the Picts" — is recorded in 580 in the Annals of Ulster, four years before Bridei's death. In addition, Adomnán mentions the presence of the "under-king of Orkney" at Bridei's court. The Annals of Ulster report two expeditions to Orkney during Bridei's reign, in 580 and 581.

The location of the court of Bridei's kingdom is not certain. Adomnán's account states that after leaving the royal court, Columba came to the River Ness and that the court was located atop a steep rock. Accordingly, it has been suggested that Bridei's chief residence was at Craig Phadrig, which is to the west of the modern city of Inverness and overlooks the Beauly Firth. Excavation at Craig Phadrig has shown that its ramparts were in a poor state of repair during Bridei's time, however, and it is, therefore, unlikely to have been a royal fortress during the period. Bridei's kingdom may also have corresponded with what would later become Fortriu.

== Popular culture ==
Juliet Marillier's trilogy The Bridei Chronicles is written as a combination of history, fiction, and informed guesswork regarding this king's rise to power and rule. Her novels also describe events in the life of Bridei III.

== See also ==
- List of kings of the Picts

== Sources ==
- Adomnán of Iona; Life of St Columba, tr. and ed. Richard Sharpe, Penguin, London, 1995. ISBN 0-14-044462-9
- Seán Mac Airt; Gearóid Mac Niocaill, eds. (1983). The Annals of Ulster (to AD 1131). Translated by Mac Airt; Mac Niocaill. Dublin: Dublin Institute for Advanced Studies.
- Anderson, Alan Orr; Early Sources of Scottish History A.D. 500–1286, volume 1. Reprinted with corrections, Paul Watkins, Stamford, 1990. ISBN 1-871615-03-8
- Anderson, Marjorie Ogilvie, Kings and Kingship in Early Scotland, Scottish Academic Press, Edinburgh, revised edition, 1980. ISBN 0-7011-1930-6
- Smyth, Alfred P.; Warlords and Holy Men: Scotland A.D. 80–1000, Edinburgh University Press, Edinburgh, 1984. ISBN 0-7486-0100-7

Regnal titles
Preceded by Galam Cennalath	King of the Picts; 554–584	Succeeded by Gartnait II
