= Drest IX =

King of the Picts from 834 to 837

King of the Picts
- Reign: 834–837
- Predecessor: Óengus II
- Successor: Eogán
- Father: Fergusa

Drest was king of the Picts, in modern Scotland, from about 834 until 837. He was the son of King Caustantín and succeeded his uncle, Óengus, to the throne.

The length of his reign is based on the various Pictish king lists, where he is associated with Talorgan son of Uuthoil. Some sources, such as John of Fordun, conflate the two kings as "Durstolorger", perhaps under the influence of the earlier "Dubthalorc".

It was once thought that Pictish kings in this period were also kings of Dál Riata, but this is no longer supported.

== See also ==
- House of Óengus

== Sources ==
- Anderson, Alan Orr; Early Sources of Scottish History A.D. 500–1286, volume 1. Reprinted with corrections, Paul Watkins, Stamford, 1990. ISBN 1-871615-03-8
- Broun, Dauvit; "Pictish Kings 761–839: Integration with Dál Riata or Separate Development" in Sally Foster (ed.), The St Andrews Sarcophagus: A Pictish masterpiece and its international connections, Dublin: Four Courts Press, 1998. ISBN 1-85182-414-6

Regnal titles
Preceded by Óengus II	King of the Picts; 834–837	Succeeded by Eogán
