= List of legendary kings of Pictland =

These monarchs are listed in the Pictish chronicles, made during the reign of Kenneth II (971-995). These monarchs are usually known as legendary or mythical kings of the Picts, this list goes up to Vipoig, for rulers after this see List of kings of the Picts.

== Cruithne and his seven sons ==
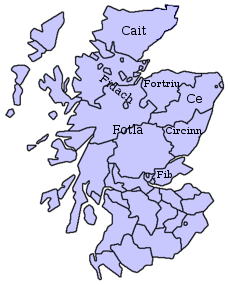
Pictish kingdoms

"Cruidne the son of Cinge, father of the Picts living in this island, ruled for 100 years. He had 7 sons. These are their names: Fib, Fidach, Floclaid, Fortrenn, Got, Ce, Circinn."

- Cruithne ruled Pictland for 135 years.
- Fib ruled Fife for 24 years
- Fidach ruled *1 for 40 years
- Floclaid ruled Athole for 30 years
- Fortren ruled Perth *2 for 70 years
- Cait ruled Caithness for 12 years
- Ce ruled *3 for 15 years
- Circin ruled Mearns for 60 years

== Rulers of the Picts (before the Brudes) ==
Name	English text	Pictish text	Ruled for
Gede olgudach	Gede olgudach 80	Gede olgudach lxxx	80 years
Denbecan	Denbecan 100	Denbecan c	100 years
Olfinecta	Olfinecta 60	Olfinecta lx	60 years
Guidid gaed brechach	Guidid gaed brechach 50	Guidid gaed brechach l	50 years
Gest gurcich	Gest gurcich 40	Gest gurcich xl	40 years
Wurgest	Wurgest 30	Wurgest xxx	30 years

== The Brudes ==
According to the Pictish Chronicles "Brude bont, from whom 30 Brudes ruled Ireland and Albany for the space of 150 years, himself ruled for 48 years. They were: pant, urpant, leo, uleo, gant, urgant, gnith, urgnith, fecir, urfecir, cal, urcal, cint, urcint, fet, urfet, ru, eru, gart et urgart, cinid, urcnid, uip, uruip, grid, urgrid, mund, urmund"

This means Bont ruled for 48 years, and for 102 years the lands were ruled by the other 28 brudes, there are not 30 brudes as mentioned, there are 28/29 brudes. After the brudes Gilgidi ruled for 150 years.

== Rulers of the Picts (after the Brudes) ==
Name	English text	Pictish text	Ruled for
Gilgidi	Gilgidi ruled for 150 years	Gilgidi c l annis regnavit	150 years
Tharain	Tharain 100 years	Tharain c	100 years
Morleo	Morelo 15	Morleo xv	15 years
Deocliunon	Deocliunon 40	Deocliunon xl	40 years
Cimoiod (mac Arcois)	Cimoiod son of Arcois 7	Cimoiod filius Arcois vij	7 years
Deoord	Deoord 50	Deoord l	50 years
Bliesbltituth	Bliesbltituth 5	Bliesbltituh v	5 years
Dectotric	Dectotric brother of Diu 40	Dectotr'ic frater Diu xl	40 years
Usconbuts	Usconbuts 30	Usconbuts xxx	30 years
Carvorst	Carvorst 40	Carvorst xl	40 years
Deo Ardivois	Deo Ardivois 20	Deo ardivois xx	20 years
Vist	Vist 50	Vist l	50 years
Ru	Ru 100	Ru c	100 years

== Before Vipoig ==
Name	Pictish text	English text	Reigned for	Reigned
Gartnait loc	Gartnaith loc, a quo Garnart iii. regnavere, ix annis regnavit	Gartnaith loc, from whom 3 Garnarts ruled, himself ruled for 9 years	9 years	296-305
Breth (mac Buthut)	Breth filius Buthut vij	Breth son of Buthut 7	7 years	305-312

Vipoig was the first confirmed king of the Picts ruling from 312-342 and was succeeded by Canutulachama. For further reading see List of kings of the Picts.
