= Talorgan =

Talorgan or Talorcan may refer to:

Ordered chronologically.

- Talorgan son of Eanfrith (died 657), King of the Picts
- Talorcan son of Drestan (died 739), king of Atholl and brother of King of the Picts Nechtan mac Der-Ilei
- Talorgan son of Fergus (died 750), brother of King of the Picts Óengus I
- Talorgan II (died 782), King of the Picts
- Talorc IV or Talorcan son of Wthoil (died 837), King of the Picts

== See also ==
- Talorg, another given name
