= Gwid son of Peithan =

7th c. warband leader

Gwid son of Peithan (fl. c. 600) was a warband leader allied with the northern Britons fighting against the Angles of Northumbria in the early 7th century, recorded in the Welsh poem Y Gododdin. He is described in Y Gododdin as a "steadfast warrior" and may have been either a southern Pict or a northern British chief.

His name may indicate that he was the father of the later Pictish kings Gartnait son of Uuid, Bridei son of Uuid, and Talorg son of Uuid who between them they ruled continuously from 631 to 653. His name may originally have read "Gwid son of Neithan", suggesting that he was the son of Neithon son of Guipno, king of the British kingdom of Alt Clut, who may in turn be the same person as the Nechtan grandson of Uerb recorded as king of the Picts from 595 to around 616.
