= 635 =

Calendar year

635 in various calendars
- Gregorian calendar: 635; DCXXXV
- Ab urbe condita: 1388
- Armenian calendar: 84; ԹՎ ՁԴ
- Assyrian calendar: 5385
- Balinese saka calendar: 556–557
- Bengali calendar: 41–42
- Berber calendar: 1585
- Buddhist calendar: 1179
- Burmese calendar: −3
- Byzantine calendar: 6143–6144
- Chinese calendar: 甲午年 (Wood Horse); 3332 or 3125 — to — 乙未年 (Wood Goat); 3333 or 3126
- Coptic calendar: 351–352
- Discordian calendar: 1801
- Ethiopian calendar: 627–628
- Hebrew calendar: 4395–4396
- Hindu calendars
- Vikram Samvat: 691–692
- Shaka Samvat: 556–557
- Kali Yuga: 3735–3736
- Holocene calendar: 10635
- Iranian calendar: 13–14
- Islamic calendar: 13–14
- Japanese calendar: N/A
- Javanese calendar: 525–526
- Julian calendar: 635; DCXXXV
- Korean calendar: 2968
- Minguo calendar: 1277 before ROC 民前1277年
- Nanakshahi calendar: −833
- Seleucid era: 946/947 AG
- Thai solar calendar: 1177–1178
- Tibetan calendar: ཤིང་ཕོ་རྟ་ལོ་ (male Wood-Horse); 761 or 380 or −392 — to — ཤིང་མོ་ལུག་ལོ་ (female Wood-Sheep); 762 or 381 or −391

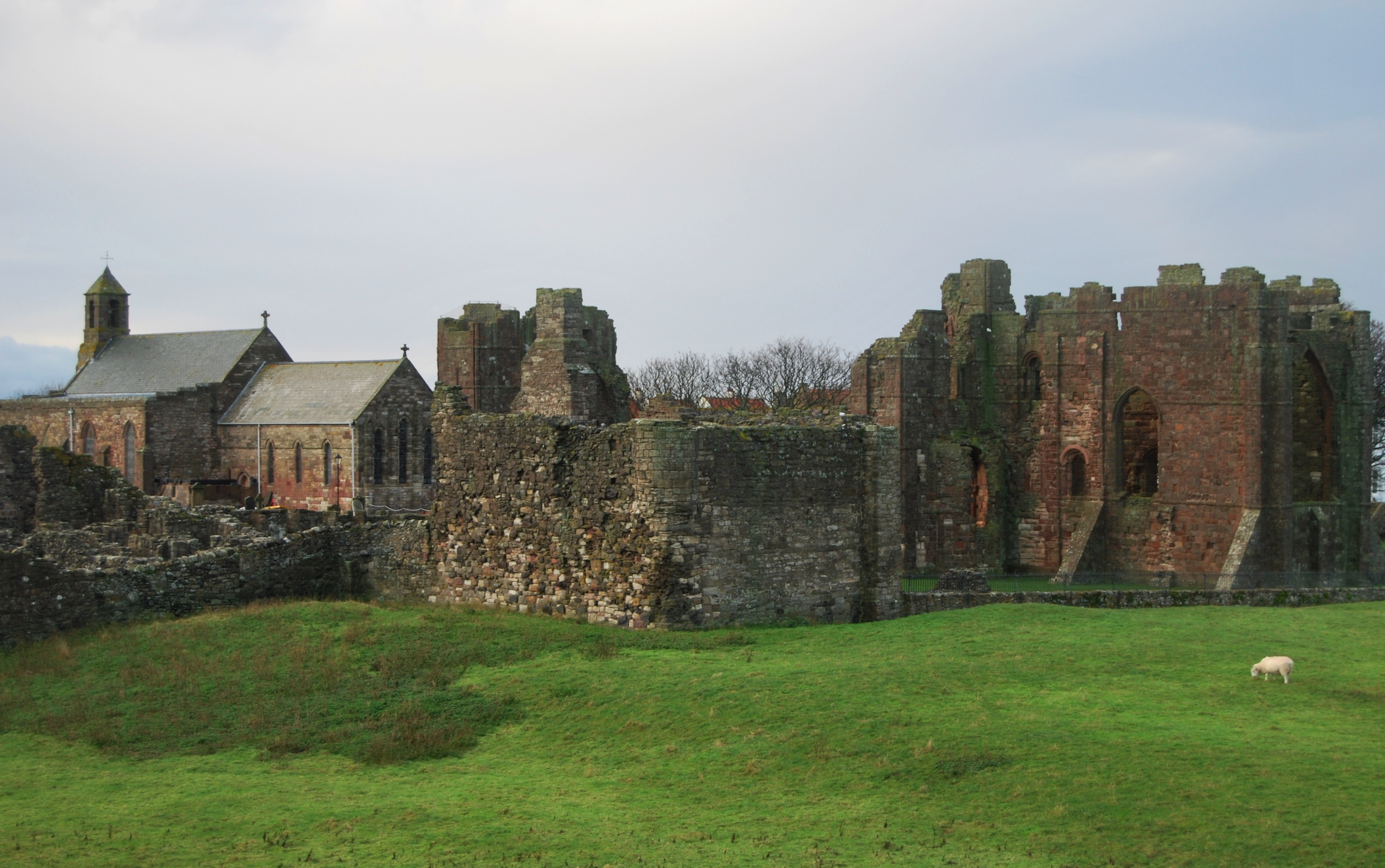
Ruins of Lindisfarne Abbey founded by Aidan

Year 635 (DCXXXV) was a common year starting on Sunday of the Julian calendar. The denomination 635 for this year has been used since the early medieval period, when the Anno Domini calendar era became the prevalent method in Europe for naming years.

== Events ==
=== By place ===
==== Byzantine Empire ====
- Emperor Heraclius makes an alliance with Kubrat, ruler (khagan) of Great Bulgaria, to break the power of the Avars on the Balkan Peninsula.

==== Europe ====
- Judicaël, high king of Domnonée (Brittany), visits King Dagobert I at his palace in Clichy (northwest of Paris), to promise he will remain under Frankish lordship. The Breton king arrives with gifts, but insults Dagobert by refusing to eat at the royal table.

==== Britain ====
- King Meurig of Glywysing and Gwent invades Ergyng (Archenfield), and reunites the two Welsh kingdoms (approximate date).
- King Gartnait III dies after a 4-year reign, and is succeeded by his brother Bridei II, as ruler of the Picts.

==== Arabia ====
- January – Battle of Fahl: The Rashidun army, (30,000 men) under Khalid ibn al-Walid (known as the "Drawn Sword of God"), defeats the Byzantine forces led by Theodore Trithyrius, at Pella in the Jordan Valley (Jordan).
- Gaza is conquered by the Muslim Arabs under 'Amr ibn al-'As. It becomes the first city in Palestine developed into a centre of Islamic law.

=== By topic ===
==== Literature ====
- Yao Silian, Chinese historian, completes his Book of Liang. It contains the history of the Liang dynasty.

==== Religion ====
- Christian missionaries arrive in China: Alopen, bishop of the Assyrian Church of the East, preaches Nestorian Christianity in the Tang dynasty capital, Chang'an.
- Aidan of Lindisfarne, Irish missionary, founds the monastery of Lindisfarne in Northumbria (northern England).
- Birinus, Frankish missionary, converts King Cynegils of Wessex and becomes the first Bishop of Dorchester.

== Births ==
- Benedict II, pope of the Catholic Church (d. 685)
- John V, pope of the Catholic Church (d. 686)
- Kʼinich Kan Bahlam II, ruler of Palenque (d. 702)
- Pepin of Herstal, Mayor of the Palace (approximate date)
- Yijing, Chinese Buddhist monk and traveler (d. 713)

== Deaths ==
- June 25 – Gao zu, emperor of the Tang dynasty (b. 566)
- Chen Shuda, prince and chancellor of the Tang dynasty
- Gartnait III, king of the Picts
- Wu Shihuo, father of Wu Zetian (b. 559)
