= House of Óengus =

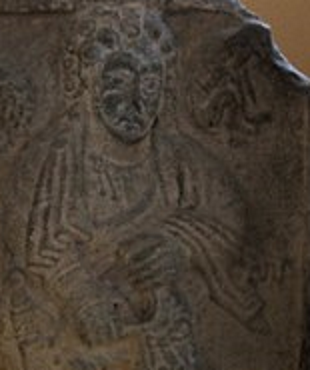
Royal figure, dressed like a late antique Roman emperor, on the St Andrews Sarcophagus, probably Óengus I of the Picts

The House of Óengus is a proposed dynasty that may have ruled as Kings of the Picts and possibly of all of northern Great Britain, for approximately a century from the 730s to the 830s AD. Their first ruler of Pictland was the great Óengus I of the Picts, who may be the figure carved into the St Andrews Sarcophagus pictured on the right.

== Origins and identity ==
Early (but not contemporary) Irish genealogies make Óengus a member of the Eóganachta of Munster, as a descendant of Coirpre Cruithnechán or "Cairbre the little Pict", a legendary emanation or double of Coirpre Luachra mac Cuirc, son of Conall Corc, and ancestor of the Eóganacht Locha Léin, rulers of the kingdom of Iarmuman. An early cycle of tales has Conall Corc traveling to Pictland early in his career, and there taking the daughter of the Pictish king as his first wife, hence Coirpre's epithet. The branch of the kindred, called in the annals the Eoghanachta Magh Geirginn, from which he came was said to be located in an area known as Circinn, usually associated with modern Angus and the Mearns. The genealogy appears in the Rawlinson B 502 manuscript, 1083:

In tres mc Corcc m. Luigdech .vii. filios habuit id est: Cairpre Cruithnechán nó Carpre Luachra mc Mongfhinne ingine Feradaich Find Fechtnaich ríg Cruthentuaithi ideo, Cairpre Cruithnechán nuncupatur & a quo Éoganacht Locha Léin.

This states the king of Pictland with whom Conall Corc stayed to have been Feradach Find Fechtnach, and his daughter, Conall's first wife and Coirpre's mother, to have been Mongfind. After discussing Corc's progeny in Munster, the future Eóganachta of history, the passage concludes with:

...Cairpre Cruithnecháin a quo Éoganacht Maigi Dergind i n-Albae .i. dia rabi Óengus rí Alban.

This states that from Coirpre Cruithnechán come a sept of the Eóganachta in Alba called the Eóganacht Maige Gerginn, to whom belongs Óengus I.

Notably lacking are over two centuries of generations in Scotland. Conall Corc is said to have flourished in the early 5th century. Óengus I belongs to the 8th.

=== Criticism ===
This pedigree has been dismissed as inspired by the tales of Conall Corc. Francis John Byrne puts this in the context of the (wider) Gaelicisation of Pictland in the 9th century, and notes how later Scottish dynasties such as the Lennoxes and the House of Stuart also found Corc to be a "usefully respectable" Gaelic ancestor.

In an exhaustive criticism of the legends, David Sproule finds that the Picts are probably a literary addition, and that the Pictish king Feredach is probably inspired by Fidach, father of Crimthann mac Fidaig, who precedes Corc on the throne of Munster but is more widely known as "King of Ireland and Alba". As Mongfind is the sister of Crimthann in most Irish legends, it follows that she would be Corc's wife. Sproule also notes that a journey to Alba is common in Irish legend, and further that Feradach Finnfechtnach is the name of an earlier Irish King of Tara who has convenient associations with Alba of his own.

Feredach can also be found as the name of several figures belonging both to the Picts and Dál Riata, for example the father of Ciniod I of the Picts.

== Monarchs ==
- Óengus I of the Picts, d. 761
- Bridei V of the Picts
- Talorgan II of the Picts, d. 782
- Drest VIII of the Picts
- Constantín mac Fergusa, d. 820
- Óengus II of the Picts, d. 834
- Drest IX of the Picts, d. 836 or 837
- Eóganan mac Óengusa, d. 839

Another member of this family may have been Domnall mac Caustantín, a possible king of Dál Riata.
