= Cailtram =

King of the Picts from 537 to 538

King of the Picts
- Reign: possibly 537–538
- Predecessor: Gartnait I
- Successor: Talorc II
- Father: Girom

Cailtram, son of Girom, was a king of the Picts possibly from 537 to 538.

The Pictish Chronicle king lists have him ruling for one or six years between his brother Gartnait son of Girom and Talorc son of Muircholach. No two lists which give a possibly authentic version of his name agree on its form, variants including Cailtarni and Cailtaine. Later versions include Kelhiran, Kelturan and Kyburcan.

He is the third son of Girom listed as king, although Drest son of Girom is not explicitly stated to have been a brother of Cailtram and Gartnait.

== Sources ==
- Anderson, Alan Orr; Early Sources of Scottish History A.D. 500–1286, volume 1. Reprinted with corrections, Paul Watkins, Stamford, 1990. ISBN 1-871615-03-8

Regnal titles
Preceded by Gartnait I	King of the Picts; 537–538	Succeeded by Talorc II
