= Alpín II =

Alpín II may refer to:

- Alpin II of Dalriada (ruled in the late 730s)
- Alpín II of the Picts (ruled 775–780)
