= Drest V =

King of the Picts from 549 to 550

King of the Picts
- Reign: 549–550
- Predecessor: Talorc II
- Successor: Galam Cennalath
- Father: Maelchon

Drest son of Maelchon was a king of the Picts from 549 to 550. The Pictish Chronicle king lists have him reign for one year between Talorc II and Galam Cennalath.

== Sources ==
- Anderson, Alan Orr; Early Sources of Scottish History A.D. 500–1286, volume 1. Reprinted with corrections, Paul Watkins, Stamford, 1990. ISBN 1-871615-03-8

Regnal titles
Preceded by Talorc II	King of the Picts; 549–550	Succeeded by Galam Cennalath
