= Drest Gurthinmoch =

King of the Picts from 480 to 510

Drest II

King of the Picts
- Reign: 480–510
- Predecessor: Nechtan I
- Successor: Galan

Drest Gurthinmoch was a king of the Picts from 480 to 510.

The Pictish Chronicle king lists all give him a reign of 30 years between Nechtan and Galan. The meaning of the epithet Gurthinmoch is unknown, but the first part may be related to the Welsh gwrdd, meaning great, and perhaps moch, in this case, correlates with the same word in Welsh which means pig.

== Sources ==
- Anderson, Alan Orr; Early Sources of Scottish History A.D. 500–1286, volume 1. Reprinted with corrections, Paul Watkins, Stamford, 1990. ISBN 1-871615-03-8

Regnal titles
| Preceded by Nechtan I | King of the Picts; 480–510 | Succeeded by Galan |
