= Bridei II =

King of the Picts from 635 to 641

King of the Picts
- Reign: 635–641
- Predecessor: Gartnait III
- Successor: Talorc III
- Died: 641
- Father: Uuid

Bridei son of Uuid (Old Irish: Bruide mac Foith; died 641) was a king of the Picts from 635 to 641.

The Pictish Chronicle king list gives him a reign of five years following his brother Gartnait III.

His death is reported by the Annals of Ulster and the Annals of Tigernach. He was followed by another brother, Talorc III, according to the king lists.

Bridei II might have been the father of the "Pictish princess" married to Eanfrith of Bernicia and might explain why their son Talorgan I became the king of the Picts in 653–657.

== Sources ==
- Anderson, Alan Orr; Early Sources of Scottish History A.D. 500–1286, volume 1. Reprinted with corrections, Paul Watkins, Stamford, 1990. ISBN 1-871615-03-8

Regnal titles
Preceded by Gartnait III	King of the Picts; 635–641	Succeeded by Talorc III
