= Ciniod I =

King of the Picts from 763 to 775

King of the Picts
- Reign: 763–775
- Predecessor: Bridei V
- Successor: Alpín II of the Picts
- Died: 775
- Father: Uuredech

Ciniod, Cináed or Cinadhon, son of Uuredech (Old Irish: Cináed mac Feradaig; English: Kenneth son of Feradach), was king of the Picts from 763 until 775.

It has been supposed that Ciniod's father was the Feradach son of Selbach mac Ferchair, king of Dál Riata, who was captured and put in chains by Óengus mac Fergusa in 736. His reign is omitted from some versions of the Pictish Chronicle king lists, but his death is noticed, and he is named as king of the Picts, by the Annals of Ulster, the Annales Cambriae and the Chronicle of Melrose. Gartnait son of Feredach is listed as a king of the Picts some time earlier, perhaps in the 720s and 730s, in those versions of the king lists which omit Ciniod.

In Ciniod's reign a battle in Fortriu, against the men of Dál Riata under Áed Find, is reported by the Annals of Ulster in 768. This is the first report of Dál Riata since around 741. The entry does not report the result of the battle.

Symeon of Durham reports that Alhred of Northumbria fled to Ciniod's court when he was deposed in 774.

Ciniod's death, as "Cinadhon, king of the Picts", is reported in several independent sources in 775.

While no sons of Ciniod are known, the death of "Eithne ingen Cinadhon", who would appear to be his daughter, is reported by the Annals of Ulster in 778.

== Sources ==
- Anderson, Alan Orr; Early Sources of Scottish History A.D. 500–1286, volume 1. Reprinted with corrections, Paul Watkins, Stamford, 1990. ISBN 1-871615-03-8
- Anderson, Alan Orr; Scottish Annals from English Chroniclers A.D. 500–1286, David Nutt, London, 1908.
- Bannerman, John; "The Scottish Takeover of Pictland" in Dauvit Broun and Thomas Owen Clancy (eds.) Spes Scotorum: Hope of Scots. Saint Columba, Iona and Scotland, T & T Clark, Edinburgh, 1999. ISBN 0-567-08682-8

Regnal titles
Preceded by Bridei V	King of the Picts; 763–775	Succeeded by Alpín II of the Picts
