= Fergus II =

Fergus II may refer to:

- Fergus mac Echdach, king of Dál Riata (modern western Scotland) from about 778 until 781
- Fergus II (son of Earc) (d. 501)
