= Nechtan Morbet =

King of the Picts from 456 to 480

Nechtan I

King of the Picts
- Reign: 456–480
- Predecessor: Talorc I
- Successor: Drest II
- Father: Erip

Nechtan, son of Erip, was the king of the Picts from 456 to 480.

The king lists supply a number of epithets for Nechtan: Morbet and Celchamoth and the Latin Magnus (the Great). W.A. Cummins suggest that 'Morbet' may be a corruption of mor breac, mor and breac being the Gaelic words for 'great' and 'freckled' respectively. Nechtan is said to have reigned for twenty-four years. In a rare change from a bald statement of names and years, the king lists provide a tradition linking Nechtan to the foundation of Abernethy:

"So Nectonius the Great, Wirp's son, the king of all the provinces of the Picts, offered to Saint Brigid, to the day of judgement, Abernethy, with its territories ... Now the cause of the offering was this. Nectonius, living in a life of exile, when his brother Drest expelled him to Ireland, begged Saint Brigid to beseech God for him. And she prayed for him and said: "If thou reach thy country, the Lord will have pity on thee. Thou shalt possess in peace the kingdom of the Picts."

A life of Saint Buíte of Monasterboice, after whom Monasterboice is named, claims that Buíte raised Nechtan from the dead, and associated him with Kirkbuddo in Strathmore.

It has been suggested that these traditions should be associated with a later Pictish king, with the very similar name of Nechtan nepos Uerb.

== Sources ==
- Anderson, Alan Orr (1990) [1922], Early Sources of Scottish History A.D. 500–1286, vol. 1 (2nd ed.), Stamford, Lincs.: Paul Watkins, ISBN 1-871615-03-8
- Anderson, Marjorie O. (1980), Kings and Kingship in Early Scotland (2nd ed.), Edinburgh: Scottish Academic Press, ISBN 0-7011-1604-8
- Evans, Nicholas (2008), "Royal succession and kingship among the Picts" (PDF), The Innes Review, 59 (1), Edinburgh: Edinburgh University Press: 1–48, doi:10.3366/e0020157x08000140, hdl:20.500.11820/657d2747-c29d-4254-989d-eb23970a9684, ISSN 0020-157X
- Fraser, James E. (2009), From Caledonia to Pictland: Scotland to 795, The New Edinburgh History of Scotland, vol. I, Edinburgh: Edinburgh University Press, ISBN 978-0-7486-1232-1
- Smyth, Alfred P. (1998) [1984], Warlords and Holy Men: Scotland AD 80–1000, The New History of Scotland, Edinburgh: Edinburgh University Press, ISBN 0-7486-0100-7

Regnal titles
Preceded by Talorc I	King of the Picts; 456–480	Succeeded by Drest II
