= Mac Echdach =

Origin
- Region of origin: Scottish

Mac Echdach is a Scottish surname. Notable people with the surname include:

- Alpín mac Echdach, disambiguation
- Eochaid mac Echdach, king of Dál Riata
- Fergus mac Echdach, king of Dál Riata (modern western Scotland)
