= Drest I =

Legendary King of the Picts from 412 to 452

King of the Picts
- Reign: 412–452
- Predecessor: Talorc mac Achiuir
- Successor: Talorc I
- Father: Erp

Drest or Drust, son of Erp, is a legendary king of the Picts from 412 to 452.

== Background ==
The Pictish Chronicle tells that Drest reigned for 100 years and triumphed in 100 battles. In the face of encroachment from Angles, Britons and Scots, he established control over much of Northern Britain after the disruption following the withdrawal of the Romans. W.A. Cummins suggests that under his leadership the Picts may have expanded their territory as far south as the line of Hadrian's Wall. The Pictish Chronicle states that Saint Patrick went to Ireland in the nineteenth year of Drest's reign, which would place it in the middle of the 5th century. The Chronicle claims that he exiled his brother Nechtan to Ireland. John of Fordun claims that Drest reigned for 45 years in the time of Palladius rather than Patrick, and conflates him with his brother Nechtan.

The king lists record that he was followed by one Talorc son of Aniel.

== Sources ==
- Anderson, Alan Orr; Early Sources of Scottish History A.D. 500–1286, volume 1. Reprinted with corrections, Paul Watkins, Stamford, 1990. ISBN 1-871615-03-8
- John of Fordun; Chronicle of the Scottish Nation, ed. William Forbes Skene, tr. Felix J. H. Skene, 2 vols. Reprinted, Llanerch Press, Lampeter, 1993. ISBN 1-897853-05-X

Regnal titles
Preceded by Talorc mac Achiuir	King of the Picts; 412–452	Succeeded by Talorc I
