= Constantine I of Scotland =

Constantine I of Scotland may refer to:

- Causantín mac Cináeda, king of the Picts, counted as Constantine I in modern lists of Scottish monarchs
- Causantín mac Fergusa, king of the Picts, counted as Constantine I prior to the Victorian era
