= Domnall mac Caustantín =

King of Dál Riata (uncertain) in early 9th century

Domnall mac Caustantín is thought to have been king of Dál Riata in the early ninth century.

Domnall's existence is uncertain, and is based on attempts to reconcile eleventh century works such as the poem Duan Albanach and the Synchronisms of Flann Mainistrech with the evidence of the Irish annals.

The Duan says that Domnall reigned for twenty-four years and places him between "Aodh", Áed Find, and the two Conalls, Conall mac Taidg and Conall mac Áedáin. Flann gives Domnall's father's name as "Constantine". The only person of that relatively uncommon name known is Causantín mac Fergusa, king of the Picts from 792 to 820. Since Áed Find died in 778, and his brother Fergus mac Echdach was king of Dál Riata at his death in 781, it is thought unlikely that Caustantín's son could have been king as early as 781. Additionally, a king named Donncoirce is reported to have died in 792, and Conall mac Taidg died in 807, making it very difficult to accommodate a 24-year reign at this time.

Since no kings of Dál Riata are known for the period from 811, when the four-year reign of Conall mac Áedáin is presumed to have ended, and the four-year reign of Áed mac Boanta who died in 839, Domnall mac Caustantín may have been king from around 811 to around 835.

== See also ==
- House of Óengus
