= Talorc II =

King of the Picts from 538 to 549

King of the Picts
- Reign: 538–549
- Predecessor: Cailtram
- Successor: Drest V
- Father: Murtolic

Talorc son of Murtolic was a king of the Picts from 538 to 549.

The Pictish Chronicle king lists have him reign for eleven years between Cailtram and Drest V. There are many variants of his father's name, including Murtolic and Mordeleg.

== Sources ==
- Anderson, Alan Orr; Early Sources of Scottish History A.D. 500–1286, volume 1. Reprinted with corrections, Paul Watkins, Stamford, 1990. ISBN 1-871615-03-8

Regnal titles
Preceded by Cailtram	King of the Picts; 538–549	Succeeded by Drest V
