= Gartnait II Duberr of the Picts =

Legendary King of the Picts from 347 to 387

Garnait II Duberr

King of the Picts
- Reign: 347–387
- Predecessor: Uradech
- Successor: Talorc mac Achiuir

Gartnait II Duberr is a legendary fourth century Pictish monarch known only from regnal lists. The regnal number II is recognition of the legendary Gartnait loc (reigned 296-305) as Gartnait I.

Regnal titles
Preceded by Uradech	King of the Picts; 347–387	Succeeded by Talorc mac Achiuir
