= Drest IV =

King of the Picts from 522 to 531

King of the Picts
- Reign: Possibly 522–531
- Predecessor: Drest III
- Successor: Gartnait I
- Father: Girom

Drest son of Girom was a king of the Picts from possibly from 522 to 531.

The Pictish Chronicle king lists associate him with Drest III. Various reigns, separately and jointly, are assigned to the two Drests, varying from one to fifteen years. After the joint rule, this Drest appears alone in the lists with a reign of five or four years. W.A. Cummins argues that the two Drests were kings of the southern Picts while Bridei son of Maelchon ruled in the north.

Drest is the first of three possible brothers, all called son of Girom, found in the king lists, the other being his successors Gartnait I and Cailtram.

== Sources ==
- Anderson, Alan Orr; Early Sources of Scottish History A.D. 500–1286, volume 1. Reprinted with corrections, Paul Watkins, Stamford, 1990. ISBN 1-871615-03-8

Preceded by Galan Erilich	King of the Picts; 522–531	Succeeded by Gartnait I
