= Donncoirce =

Donncoirce (or Donn Corci) was probably king of Dál Riata until his death in 792.

Donncoirce's death, the only report of his existence, appears in the Annals of Ulster for the year 791, corresponding with 792 AD. In it he is called "Donncoirce, king of Dál Riata". Donncoirce is not listed as a king in the Synchronisms of Flann Mainistrech, or in the Duan Albanach, nor does he appear under this name in any surviving genealogies. W.A. Cummins has suggested that he may be the Domnall identified as reigning for 24 years in the Scottish King Lists. Alan Orr Anderson has suggested that the name Donncoirce may be a byname, perhaps meaning "Brown Oats".

Donncoirce is the last king of Dál Riata so called by surviving Irish annals.

Dauvit Broun's reconstruction of the late Dál Riata kings places the beginning of Donncoirce's reign at the death of Fergus mac Echdach in 781 or 782.
