= Vipoig =

Legendary King of the Picts from 311 to 341

King of the Picts
- Reign: 311–341
- Predecessor: Title established
- Successor: Canutulachama
- Died: 341

Vipoig (died c. A.D. 341) was a legendary Pictish king said to have ruled from around 311 to 341. He is only known from the Pictish Chronicle, a regnal list of Pictish monarchs. He is the first king mentioned in the chronicles and was said to be succeeded by Canutulachama. The etymology of Vipoig was suggested as from Vepogenus/Uepogenus, connected to Welsh gwep (face) + geno (lineage, family).

Regnal titles
Preceded by Title established	King of the Picts; 311–341	Succeeded by Canutulachama
