= Gartnait III =

King of the Picts from 631 to 635

King of the Picts
- Reign: 631–635
- Predecessor: Cinioch
- Successor: Bridei II
- Died: 635
- Father: Uuid

Gartnait son of Foith or son of Uuid (died 635) was a king of the Picts from 631 to 635.

The Pictish Chronicle king lists give him a reign of four years, corresponding with the Irish annals, although variants say five and eight years.

His death is reported by the Annals of Ulster for 637. He was followed by his brother Bridei son of Uuid according to the king lists. A third brother, Talorc, was king after Bruide.

== Sources ==
- Anderson, Alan Orr; Early Sources of Scottish History A.D. 500–1286, volume 1. Reprinted with corrections, Paul Watkins, Stamford, 1990. ISBN 1-871615-03-8

Regnal titles
Preceded by Cinioch	King of the Picts; 631–635	Succeeded by Bridei II
