= Gartnait I =

King of the Picts from 531 to 537

King of the Picts
- Reign: 531–537
- Predecessor: Drest IV
- Successor: Cailtram
- Father: Girom

Gartnait son of Girom was a king of the Picts from 531 to 537.

The Pictish Chronicle king lists have him ruling for six or seven years between Drest IV and Cailtram.

Cailtram is said to have been Gartnait's brother and three sons of Girom are successively listed as king, although Drest son of Girom is not explicitly stated to have been a brother of Gartnait and Cailtram.

Historian Damian Bullen has suggested that Gartnait is the historical figure behind the myth of King Arthur and that he had his residence in Rhynie in Aberdeenshire. He identifies his mother Girom as Gigurnus, Gygurn or Igraine while his father Uudrost as Uther Pendragon, and king Cailtram who ruled after him as Sir Kay of legends.

== Sources ==
- Anderson, Alan Orr; Early Sources of Scottish History A.D. 500–1286, volume 1. Reprinted with corrections, Paul Watkins, Stamford, 1990. ISBN 1-871615-03-8

Regnal titles
Preceded by Drest IV	King of the Picts; 531–537	Succeeded by Cailtram
