= Banbáin Os Cach =

7th-century Lector of Kildare

Banbáin Os Cach, Lector of Kildare, died 686.

The Annals of Tigernach record his death, sub anno 686: Mors Banbain Os Cach sapientis, fer légind Cilli Dara. His nickname means wise above everyone, rendered as sapienties in Latin.
