= Nechtan nepos Uerb =

King of the Picts from 595 to 616

King of the Picts
- Reign: 595–616
- Predecessor: Gartnait II
- Successor: Cinioch
- Father: Cano

Nechtan grandson of Uerb, was king of the Picts from 595 to around 616, and may be the same person as the Neithon son of Guipno who ruled the kingdom of Altclut.

According to the Pictish Chronicle, Nechtan reigned for 20 or 21 years. While the death of his predecessor Gartnait is given in 597 by the Annals of Tigernach, the death of Nechtan is not certainly recorded. He may be the Nechtan son of Canu whose death appears in the Annals of Ulster for 621, although this would be difficult to reconcile with the idea that he was Neithon son of Guipno son of Dumnagual Hen of Alt Clut.

It has been suggested that the Canu or Cano referred to in the Annals of Ulster is the Canu Garb named by Senchus fer n-Alban, making this Nechtan the grandson of Gartnait II, who has been suggested as a son of Áedán mac Gabráin of Dál Riata.

It is uncertain whether it is this Nechtan or Nechtan I who should be linked with the foundation of the monastery at Abernethy, but since this Nechtan reigned after the foundation of Iona by Columba, ties with Irish monastic houses are more plausible in his reign. The account of Abernethy's foundation in the Pictish Chronicle, in a version likely compiled by the monks of Abernethy, is as follows, with Nechtan I as the subject:

So Nectonius the Great, Uuirp's son, the king of all the provinces of the Picts, offered to Saint Brigid, to the day of judgement, Abernethy, with its territories ... Now the cause of the offering was this. Nectonius, living in a life of exile, when his brother Drest expelled him to Ireland, begged Saint Brigid to beseech God for him. And she prayed for him and said: "If thou reach thy country, the Lord will have pity on thee. Thou shalt possess in peace the kingdom of the Picts."

Andrew of Wyntoun's Orygynale Cronykil of Scotland, while confusing this Nechtan with Nechtan mac Der-Ilei, who reigned a century later and was also famous as a builder of churches, claims that he founded "a cathedral" dedicated to Saint Boniface at Rosemarkie on the Black Isle. A monastery at nearby Portmahomack, dated to the late 6th century, could be as late as the reign of Nechtan, although it is probably earlier.

== Sources ==
- Anderson, Alan Orr; Early Sources of Scottish History A.D. 500–1286, volume 1. Reprinted with corrections, Paul Watkins, Stamford, 1990. ISBN 1-871615-03-8
- Bannerman, John; Studies in the History of Dalriada, Edinburgh: Scottish Academic Press, 1974. ISBN 0-7011-2040-1
- Smyth, Alfred P.; Warlords and Holy Men: Scotland A.D. 80-1000, Reprinted, Edinburgh, Edinburgh University Press, 1998. ISBN 0-7486-0100-7

Regnal titles
Preceded by Gartnait II	King of the Picts; 595–616	Succeeded by Cinioch
