= List of kings of the Picts =

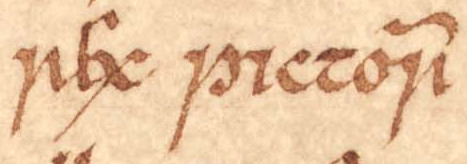
Text reading Rex Pictorum in MS Rawlinson B 489 (Annals of Ulster)

The list of kings of the Picts is based on the Pictish Chronicle king lists. These are late documents and do not record the dates when the kings reigned. The various surviving lists disagree in places as to the names of kings, and the lengths of their reigns. The latter parts of the lists can largely be reconciled with other sources. A large portion of the lists, belonging with Scottish mythology or Irish mythology, are given in the separate list of legendary kings of Pictland.

== Pictish kings ==
Pictish kings ruled in northern and eastern Scotland. In 843 A.D., tradition records the replacement of the Pictish kingdom by the Kingdom of Alba, although the Irish annals continue to use Picts and Fortriu for half a century after 843. The king lists are thought to have been compiled in the early 8^{th} century, probably by 724, placing them in the reigns of the sons of Der-Ilei, Bridei and Nechtan.

Irish annals (the Annals of Ulster, Annals of Innisfallen) refer to some kings as king of Fortriu or king of Alba. The kings listed are thought to represent overkings of the Picts, at least from the time of Bridei, son of Maelchon, onwards. In addition to these overkings, many less powerful subject kings existed, of whom only a very few are known from the historical record.

Mythical kings of the Picts are listed in the Lebor Bretnach's account of the origins of the Cruithne. The list begins with Cruithne, son of Cing, who is reported to be "father of the Picts". The account of the Pictish Chronicle then splits into four lists of names:

- The first is a list of the sons of Cruithne;
- The second is a list of early kings with no distinguishing information other than dates;
- The third is another list of early kings with neither stories nor dates, all of whom have two names that begin with "Brude". It is possible that "Brude" is an ancient title for "king" from another source, which was misinterpreted as a name by the compiler (cf. Skene p.cv);
- The fourth is a list of later kings. The first of these to be attested in an independent source is Galam Cennalath.

The dates given here are drawn from early sources unless specifically noted otherwise. The relationships between kings are less than certain and rely on modern readings of the sources.

== Names ==
Orthography is problematic. Cinioch, Ciniod and Cináed all represent ancestors of the modern Anglicised name Kenneth. Pictish "uu", sometimes printed as "w", corresponds with Gaelic "f", so that Uuredach is the Gaelic Feredach and Uurguist the Gaelic Fergus, or perhaps Forgus. As the Dupplin Cross inscription shows, the idea that Irish sources Gaelicised Pictish names may not be entirely accurate.

== Kings of the Picts ==
Colouring indicates groups of kings presumed to be related.

=== Early kings ===
Reign	Ruler	Other names	Family	Remarks
311–341	Vipoig			Reigned 30 years
341–345	Canutulachama			Reigned 4 years
345–347	Uradech			Reigned 2 years
347–387	Gartnait II			Reigned 40 years
387–412	Talorc mac Achiuir			Reigned 25 years
412–452	Drest I	Drest, son of Erp		First king of the Pictish Chronicle lists, whose reign includes a synchronism (the coming of Saint Patrick to Ireland; "ruled a hundred years and fought a hundred battles")
452–456	Talorc I	Talorc, son of Aniel		An entry in the king lists; reigned 2 or 4 years
456–480	Nechtan I	Nechtan, son of Uuirp (or Erip); Nechtan the Great, Nechtan Celcamoth	Possibly a brother of Drest, son of Erp	The foundation of the monastery at Abernethy is fathered on this king, almost certainly spuriously. A similar name nehhtton(s) was found on the Lunnasting stone; one interpretator of which suggested it containing the phrase: "the vassal of Nehtonn".
480–510	Drest II	Drest Gurthinmoch (or Gocinecht)		An entry in the king lists; reigned 30 years
510–522	Galan	Galan Erilich or Galany		An entry in the king lists
522–530	Drest III	Drest, son of Uudrost (or Hudrossig)		An entry in the king lists
522–531	Drest IV	Drest, son of Girom (or Gurum)		An entry in the king lists
531–537	Gartnait I	Garthnac, son of Girom; Ganat, son of Gigurum		An entry in the king lists
537–538	Cailtram	Cailtram, son of Girom; Kelturan, son of Gigurum	Brother of the preceding Gartnait	An entry in the king lists
538–549	Talorc II	Talorc, son of Murtolic; Tolorg, son of Mordeleg		An entry in the king lists
549–550	Drest V	Drest, son of Manath; Drest, son of Munait		An entry in the king lists

=== Early historical kings ===
The first king who appears in multiple early sources is Bridei, son of Maelchon, and the kings from the later 6^{th} century onwards may be considered historical, as their deaths are generally reported in Irish sources.

Reign	Ruler	Other names	Family	Remarks
550–555	Galam	Galam Cennalath		The death of "Cennalaph, king of the Picts" is recorded; may have ruled jointly with Bridei, son of Maelchon
554–584	Bridei I	Bridei, son of Maelchon; Brude, son of Melcho		His death and other activities are recorded; he is named in Adomnán's Life of Saint Columba; the first Pictish king to be more than a name in a list
584–595	Gartnait II	Gartnait, son of Domelch; Gernard, son of Dompneth		
595–616	Nechtan II	Nechtan, grandson of Uerb; Nechtan, son of Cano		His reign is placed in the time of Pope Boniface IV
616–631	Cinioch	Cinioch, son of Lutrin; Kinet, son of Luthren		
631–635	Gartnait III	Gartnait, son of Uuid	son of Gwid, son of Peithan?	
635–641	Bridei II	Bridei, son of Uuid or son of Fochle	son of Gwid, son of Peithan?	
641–653	Talorc III	Talorc, son of Uuid or son of Foth	son of Gwid, son of Peithan?	
653–657	Talorgan I	Talorgan, son of Eanfrith	son of Eanfrith of Bernicia	
657–663	Gartnait IV	Gartnait, son of Donnel or son of Dúngal		
663–672	Drest VI	Gartnait, son of Donnel or son of Dúngal		

=== Later historical kings ===
Reign	Ruler	Other names	Family	Remarks
672–693	Bridei III	Bridei, son of Bili	Son of Beli I of Alt Clut, son of Nechtan II	At war with the Scots in 683. Defeated Ecgfrith of Northumbria, at the Battle of Dun Nechtain in 685.
693–697	Taran	Taran, son of Ainftech	Possibly a maternal half-brother of Bridei and Nechtan mac Der-Ilei	
697–706	Bridei IV	Bridei, son of Der-Ilei	Brother of Nechtan, Cenél Comgaill	Son of Der-Ilei, a Pictish princess, and Dargart mac Finnguine, a member of the Cenél Comgaill of Dál Riata; listed as a guarantor of the Cáin Adomnáin
706–724	Nechtan III	Nechtan, son of Der-Ilei	Brother of Bridei, Cenél Comgaill	Adopted the Roman dating of Easter c. 712; a noted founder of churches and monasteries
724–726	Drest VII	Drust	Perhaps son of a half-brother of Nechtan and Bridei. Possibly of Cenél nGabráin of Atholl ['New Ireland'] (T.O. Clancy, 2004)	Succeeded Nechtan, imprisoned him in 726, may have been deposed that year by Alpín
726–728	Alpín I	Alpin mac Echach	Possibly of Cenél nGabráin (M.O. Anderson, 1973)	Probably a co-ruler with Drest. Also king of Dal Riata, AT726.4. "Dungal was removed from rule, and Drust of the rule of the Picts removed, and Elphin reigns for them."
728–729	Nechtan III restored	Nechtan, son of Der-Ilei, second reign	Cenél Comgaill	It has been suggests that Óengus defeated the enemy of Nechtan in 729, and Nechtan continued to rule until 732.
729–761	Óengus I	Onuist, son of Vurguist	Claimed as a kinsman by the Eóganachta	
736–750	Talorgan II	Talorcan, son of Fergus; Talargan, Talrgan	Brother of Óengus	Killed in battle against the Britons of Altclut
761–763	Bridei V	Bridei, son of Fergus	Brother of Onuist	King of Fortriu
763–775	Ciniod I	Ciniod, son of Uuredach; Cinadhon, Cinioyd Chemoith, Cenioid	Sometimes thought to be a grandson of Selbach mac Ferchair and, hence, of Cenél Loairn	Granted asylum to the deposed king Alhred of Northumbria
775–778	Alpín II	Alpin, son of Uuroid		Death reported as Eilpín, king of the Saxons, but this is taken to be an error
778–782	Talorc II	Talorc, son of Drest		Death reported in the Ulster Annals
782–783	Drest VIII	Drest, son of Talorgan	Son of the preceding Talorgan or of Talorgan, brother of Óengus	
783–785	Talorc III	Talorgan, son of Onuist, also Dub Tholarg	Son of Óengus	
785–789	Conall	Conall, son of Tarla (or of Tadg)		Perhaps rather a king in Dál Riata
789–820	Caustantín	Caustantín, son of Fergus	A grandson or grandnephew of Onuist or perhaps a son of Fergus mac Echdach	His son, Domnall, may have been king of Dál Riata
820–834	Óengus II	Óengus, son of Fergus	Brother of Caustantín	
834–837	Drest IX	Drest, son of Caustantín	Son of Caustantín	
834–837	Talorc IV	Talorcan, son of Wthoil		
837–839	Eógan	Eógan, son of Óengus	Son of Óengus; his brothers were Nechtan and Finguine.	Killed in 839 with Bran, his brother, in battle against the Vikings; this led to a decade of conflict

=== Kings of the Picts 839–848 (not successively) ===
The deaths of Eógan and Bran appear to have led to a large number of competitors for the throne of Pictland.

Reign	Ruler	Other names	Family	Remarks
839–842	Uurad	Uurad, son of Bargoit	Unknown	Said to have reigned for three years, probably named on the Drosten Stone
842–843	Bridei VI	Bridei, son of Uurad	Possibly the son of the previous king	Said to have reigned one year
843	Ciniod II	Kenneth, son of Ferath	Possibly the brother of the previous king	Said to have reigned one year in some lists
843–845	Bridei VII	Brudei, son of Uuthoi	Unknown	Said to have reigned two years in some lists
845–848	Drest X	Drest, son of Uurad	As previous sons of Uurad	Said to have reigned three years in some lists; the myth of MacAlpin's treason calls the Pictish king "Drest"
848– 13 February 858	Kenneth MacAlpin	Ciniod, son of Elphin; Cináed mac Ailpín, Coinneach mac Ailpein	Unknown, but his descendants made him a member of the Cenél nGabráin of Dál Riata	Conquered Pictland in the year 843 AD and was crowned at Scone, as the first king of Scots

=== Kings of the Picts traditionally counted as King of Scots ===
Cináed mac Ailpín (Kenneth MacAlpin in English) defeated the rival kings, winning out by around 845–848. He is traditionally considered the first "king of Scots", or of "Picts and Scots", allegedly having conquered the Picts as a Gael, which is turning history back to front. As most modern scholars point out, he was actually "king of Picts", and the terms "king of Alba" and the even later "king of Scots" were not used, until several generations after him.

Reign	Ruler	Other names	Family	Remarks
Died 13 February 858	Kenneth MacAlpin	Ciniod, son of Elphin; Cináed mac Ailpín; Coinneach mac Ailpein; Cenioyth; Ceniod	Unknown, but his descendants made him a member of the Cenél nGabráin of Dál Riata	
Died 862	Domnall	Domnall mac Ailpín; Dòmhnall mac Ailpein; Donald MacAlpin; Donald I	Brother of Cináed	
Died 877	Causantín	Causantín mac Cináeda; Còiseam mac Choinnich; Constantín mac Cináeda; Constantine I	Son of Cináed	
Died 878	Áed	Áed mac Cináeda; Aodh mac Choinnich; Aedth; Edus	Son of Cináed	
Deposed 889?	Eochaid		Son of Rhun ap Arthgal and maternal grandson of Cináed	Associated with Giric. Could have shared kingship with Giric, either as an equal partner, or adversary. Could have also reigned as king of Strathclyde
Deposed 889?	Giric	Giric mac Dúngail; Griogair mac Dhunghail "Mac Rath" ("Son of Fortune")	Cináed's daughter's son?	Associated with Eochaid
Died 900	Domnall	Domnall mac Causantín; Dòmhnall mac Chòiseim; Donald II "Dásachtach" ("The Madman")	Son of Causantín mac Cináeda	Last to be called "king of the Picts"

=== King of Alba ===
Reign	Ruler	Other names	Family	Remarks
Abdicated 943, died 952	Causantín	Causantín mac Áeda; Còiseam mac Aoidh; Constantine II	Son of Áed mac Cináeda	First king of Alba, the kingdom that later became known as "Scotland".

== See also ==
- Siol Alpin
- Origins of the Kingdom of Alba
- List of Kings of Dál Riata
- List of Kings of Strathclyde

== Sources ==
For primary sources, see External links below

- Adomnán, Life of St Columba, tr. & ed. Richard Sharpe. Penguin, London, 1995. ISBN 0-14-044462-9
- Anderson, Alan Orr, Early Sources of Scottish History A.D. 500–1286, vol. 1. Reprinted with corrections. Paul Watkins, Stamford, 1990. ISBN 1-871615-03-8
- Bannerman, John, Studies in the History of Dalriada. Scottish Academic Press, Edinburgh, 1974. ISBN 0-7011-2040-1
- Bannerman, John. "The Scottish Takeover of Pictland and the relics of Columba" in Dauvit Broun and Thomas Owen Clancy (eds.) Spes Scotorum: Saint Columba, Iona and Scotland. Edinburgh: T. & T. Clark, 1999. ISBN 0-567-08682-8
- Broun, Dauvit, "Dunkeld and the origin of Scottish identity" in Broun & Clancy (1999).
- Broun, Dauvit, "Pictish Kings 761–839: Integration with Dál Riata or Separate Development" in Sally M. Foster (ed.), The St Andrews Sarcophagus: A Pictish masterpiece and its international connections. Four Courts, Dublin, 1998. ISBN 1-85182-414-6
- Clancy, Thomas Owen, "Caustantín son of Fergus (Uurgust)" in M. Lynch (ed.) The Oxford Companion to Scottish History. Oxford & New York: Oxford UP, 2002. ISBN 0-19-211696-7
- Herbert, Máire, "Ri Éirenn, Ri Alban: kingship and identity in the ninth and tenth centuries" in Simon Taylor (ed.), Kings, clerics and chronicles in Scotland 500–1297. Four Courts, Dublin, 2000. ISBN 1-85182-516-9
- Skene, William F. Chronicles of the Picts, Chronicles of the Scots, and other Early Memorials of Scottish History. Edinburgh: H.M. General Register House, 1867.
- Smyth, Alfred P. Warlords and Holy Men: Scotland AD 80–1000. Reprinted, Edinburgh: Edinburgh UP, 1998. ISBN 0-7486-0100-7
- Woolf, Alex, "Pictish matriliny reconsidered" in The Innes Review, Volume XLIV, Number 2 (Autumn 1998). ISSN 0020-157X
- Woolf, Alex, "Ungus (Onuist), son of Uurgust" in M. Lynch (2002).
