= Ballantine and Gardiner =

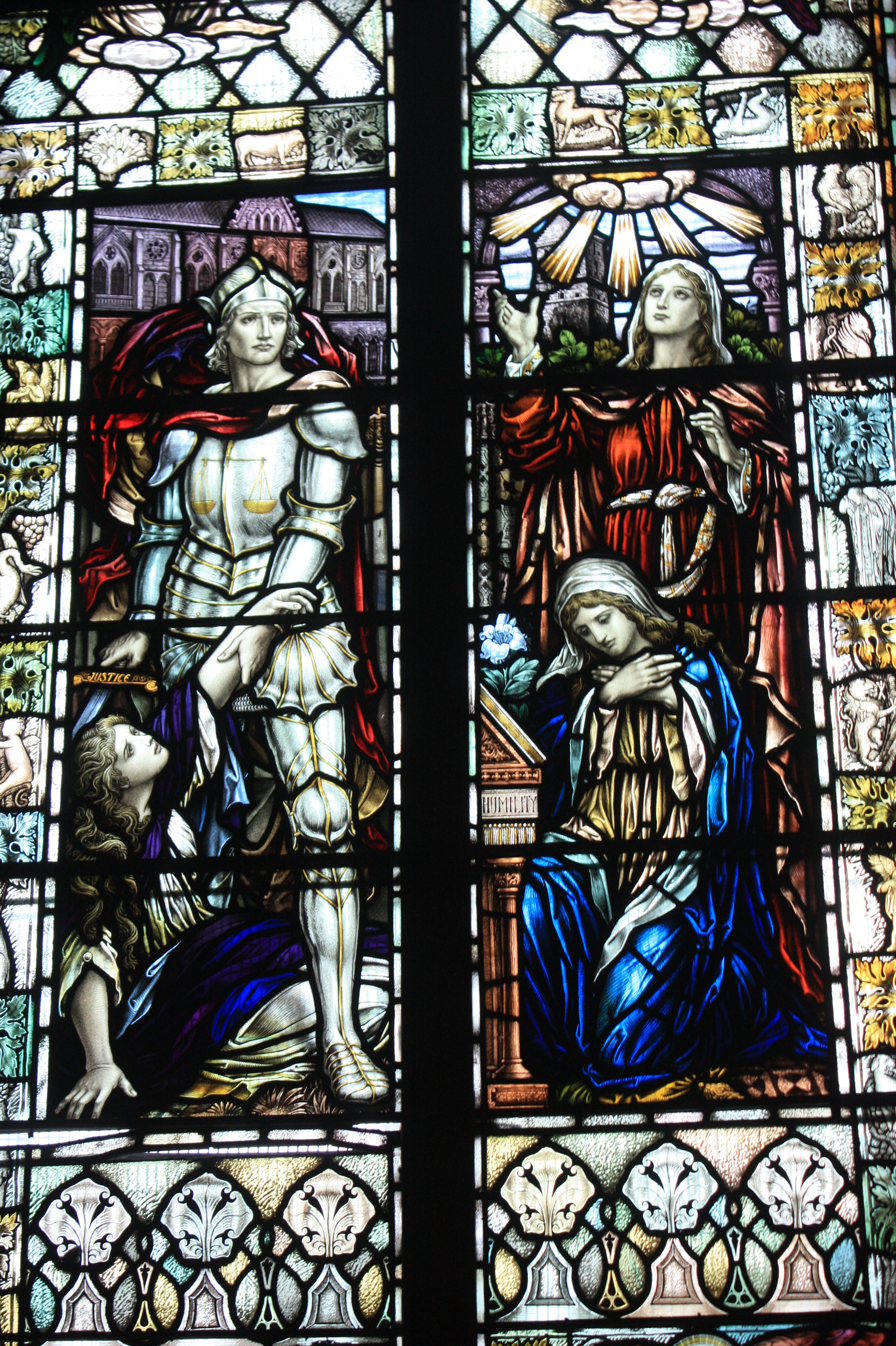
- The company's work on display at St Serf's Church, Dunning, Scotland
- Known for: stained glass

Ballantine and Gardiner was a Scottish manufacturer of stained-glass windows, one of several names the company worked under.

The business was founded in Edinburgh by James Ballantine (1806–1877) and George Allan as Ballantine and Allan. They began making stained glass in the 1830s.

In 1843, they won a competition to design windows for the new Houses of Parliament, although it was subsequently changed to that of the House of Lords.

James' son, Alexander (1841–1906), joined the business, which thence became known as Ballantine and Son until 1905. Herbert Gardiner joined in 1905. Alexander's son, James Ballantine III, also joined in 1905, a year before his father's death.

Some of the firm's work was signed with the alternative spelling of Ballantyne.

== Selected notable works ==
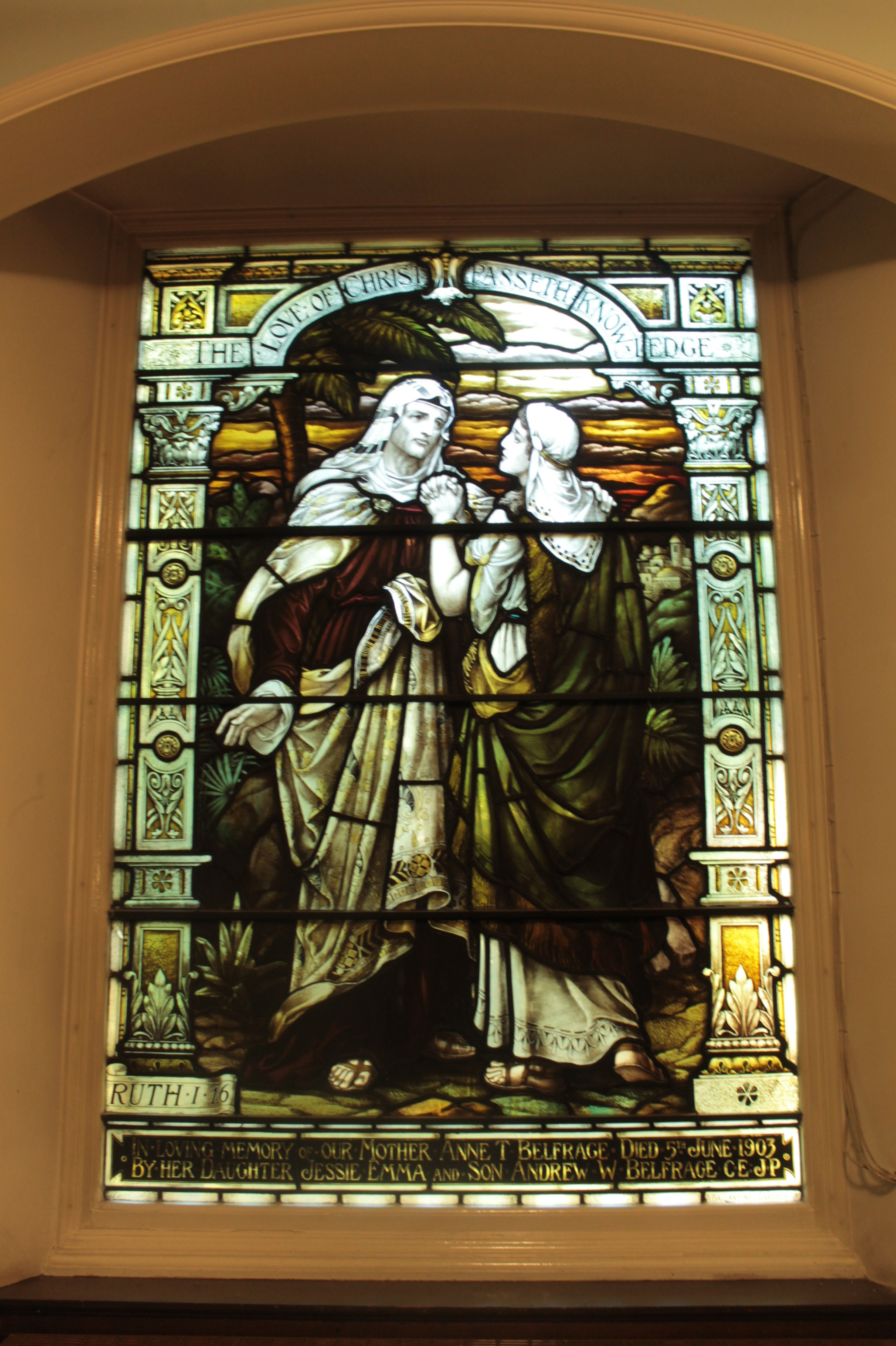
Stained glass by Ballantine & Gardiner, St Cuthbert's Church, Edinburgh

The company installed the windows of the following buildings:

- Glenormiston House, Innerleithen, 1851
- Sandyford Henderson Church, Glasgow, 1857
- St Serf's Church, Dunning, c. 1900
- House of Lords, London
- Hamilton Old Parish Church - a window representing Jesus, Martha and Mary that was fitted in 1876
- Main hall of Dunoon Burgh Hall (the subject possibly being the building's architect Robert Alexander Bryden)
- St John's Kirk, Perth
- St Cuthbert's Church, Edinburgh
- St Michael's Church, Edinburgh
