= Dunning, Perth and Kinross =

Coordinates: 56.31180°N 3.58896°W

Dunning: Scottish Gaelic: An Duinean
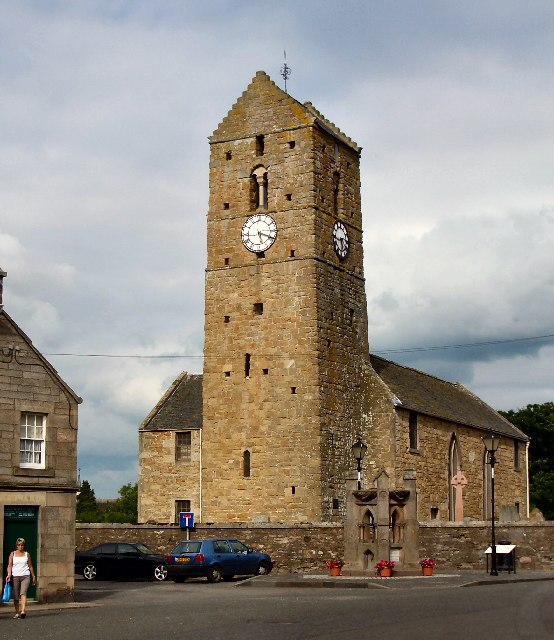
- St Serf's Church

- Location within Perth and Kinross
- Population: 950 (2020)
- Council area: Perth and Kinross
- Country: Scotland
- Sovereign state: United Kingdom
- Police: Scotland
- Fire: Scottish
- Ambulance: Scottish

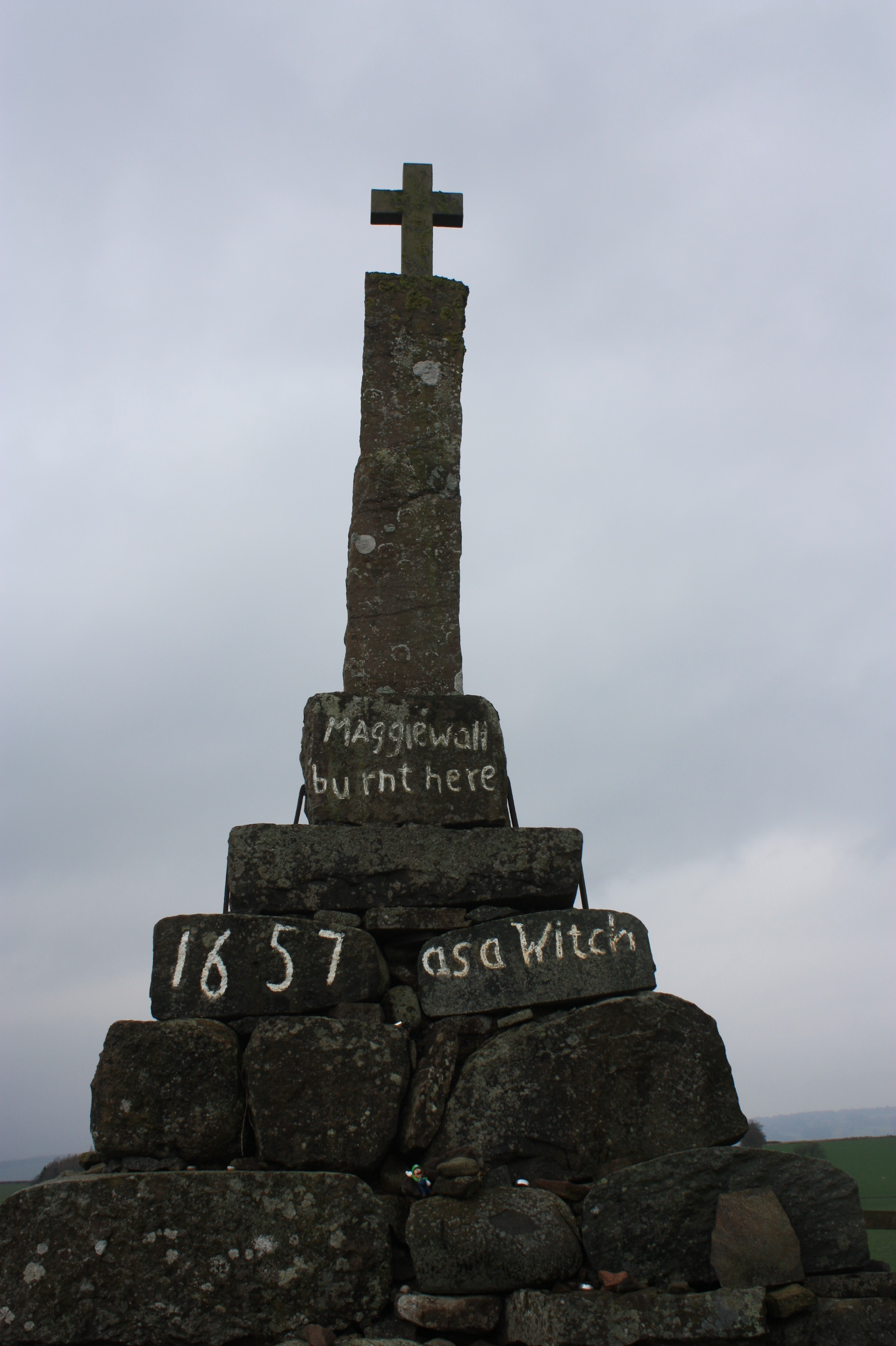
Cairn to Maggie Wall, Dunning

Dunning is a small village in Perth and Kinross in Scotland with a population of about 1,000. The village centres around the 12th–13th century former parish church of St. Serf, where the Dupplin Cross is displayed (Historic Scotland; open in summer without entrance charge). It is in Strathearn, north of the Ochil Hills. It is just south of the A9, between Auchterarder and Perth.

== History ==
There was an Iron Age fort on Dun Knock (no visible remains) and a 1st-century Roman camp at Kincladie (part of the rampart and ditch survive in Kincladie Wood). The former is the probable origin of the name Dunning, ex Old Irish dúnán 'little fort'. Legend tells that Saint Serf (fl. 8th century?) killed a dragon here, and there is a thorn tree planted in Jacobite times.

The Dunning Parish Historical Society website includes St. Serf's Church graveyard survey and Dunning parish census records, both useful for genealogy research. The village (except the church) was burned during the 1715 Jacobite Rebellion. The oldest surviving house (recently restored) dates from the 1730s.

The fountain at the centre of the village dates from 1874 and was gifted by Alexander Martin, a former Dunning resident, who made his fortune in New Brunswick as a confectioner. It includes interesting stone carvings in a medieval style, including an otter eating a trout.

A plaque on the outer kirkyard wall commemorates the evacuated children (mainly from Glasgow) who stayed here during the Second World War.

The Kirkstyle Inn, dating to the 19th century, is still in operation.

Dunning was served by Dunning railway station on the Scottish Central Railway from 1848 until the station closed in 1956.

== St. Serf's Kirk ==
The building has a distinctive and largely intact tower dating from around 1200. The interior was remodelled in the early 19th century to place the pulpit centrally after adding a north wing and internal galleries. Stained glass is of an excellent standard, especially for a rural kirk and is by Ballantine and Gardiner. The kirk was in use until 1972 but is now in the care of Historic Scotland. It is visible to the public at no charge but under supervision.

The kirkyard includes early dated stones 1623 and 1624.

The building was used in the filming of the 2000 Scottish film Complicity.

=== The Dupplin Cross ===
The cross was placed in the church after a protest to Historic Scotland at its removal from its home in Dunning.

== Maggie Wall ==
In a field north-west of the village stands a sombre 18th-century monument bearing the inscription "Maggie Wall was burnt here 1657 as a Witch".

== Notable residents ==
Notable residents include decorated SAS Commander Brigadier Rory Walker OBE MC. Several of the Lords Rollo lie buried in the kirkyard. Rollo Park is named after the family.

- Rev Paton James Gloag was minister of Dunning from 1848 to 1857 and became Moderator of the General Assembly of the Church of Scotland in 1889.
- Prof James Robert Matthews FRSE FLS (1889–1978) an eminent 20th century botanist was born and raised in Dunning.
- Sir John Mackay Thomson FRSE (1887–1974) classicist and senior civil servant, son of Dunning's minister, Rev Peter Thomson DD.
- Barbara Balmain Dougall wife of renowned geographer and writer John Francon Williams was born in Dunning in 1851. Barbara was one of seven children (Aeneas, David, Margaret, Isabella, Ann, Mary and Barbara) born to John and Ann Dougall. John Dougall was a handloom weaver and his wife Ann was a cotton winder. Barbara and John Francon Williams are the parents of the missionary, chaplain and writer Aeneas Francon Williams and the artist David Dougal Williams.
- Walter Perrie (born 1949), poet, author, editor and critic.

== Current village ==
Dunning Community Trust aims to help shape and improve the village of Dunning and surroundings for future generations. One of the trust's main projects is the care of Kincladie Wood.

The village includes a recreation area which embraces a nine-hole golf course, a football pitch, tennis court and lawn bowling.

== See also ==
- List of places in Perth and Kinross
- List of places in Highland
- List of places in Aberdeenshire
- List of places in Angus
- List of places in Stirling district
- List of places in Argyll and Bute
- Map sources for Dunning, Perth and Kinross
