= Alpín II of the Picts =

King of the Picts from 775 to 778

King of the Picts
- Reign: 775–778
- Predecessor: Ciniod I
- Successor: Talorc II
- Died: 780
- Father: Uuroid

Alpín son of Uuroid (Old Irish: Alpín mac Feredaig) was king of the Picts from 775 until 778.

On anthroponymic grounds Alpin may have been the brother of his predecessor Ciniod son of Uuredach as both have similar patronyms, the Pictish equivalent of the Old Irish Feredach, but no certain evidence exists for this identification, nor for an assumption that he was a member of the Cenél Loairn which might follow from it.

He appears to have reigned from the death of Ciniod until his own death in 780. This is misreported in the Annals of Ulster as that of Alpin, king of the Saxons, but no Saxon king named Ælfwine is known from this time. The Annals of Clonmacnoise name him Alpin, king of the Picts, and this reading is taken as the correct one.

== Sources ==
- Anderson, Alan Orr; Early Sources of Scottish History A.D. 500–1286, volume 1. Reprinted with corrections, Paul Watkins, Stamford, 1990. ISBN 1-871615-03-8
- Bannerman, John; "The Scottish Takeover of Pictland" in Dauvit Broun and Thomas Owen Clancy (eds.) Spes Scotorum: Hope of Scots. Saint Columba, Iona and Scotland. T & T Clark, Edinburgh, 1999. ISBN 0-567-08682-8

Regnal titles
Preceded by Ciniod I	King of the Picts; 775–778	Succeeded by Talorc II
