= St Serf's Church, Dunning =

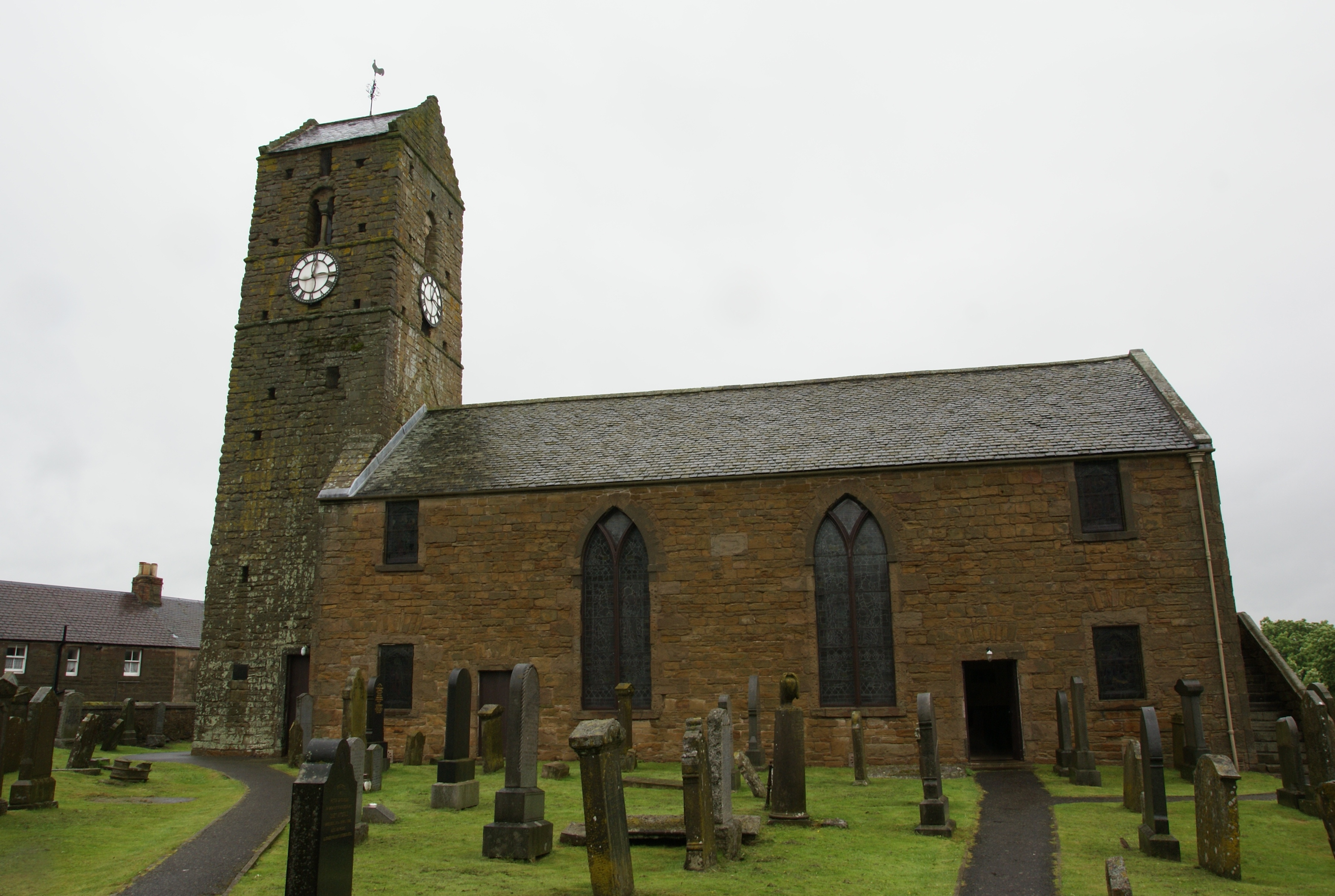
- The church in 2009
- Interactive map of St Serf's Church, Dunning
- 56.31262°N 3.587295°W

History
- Built: c. 1810; 216 years ago

Listed Building – Category A
- Official name: St. Serf's Church
- Designated: 3 October 2017
- Reference no.: LB52454

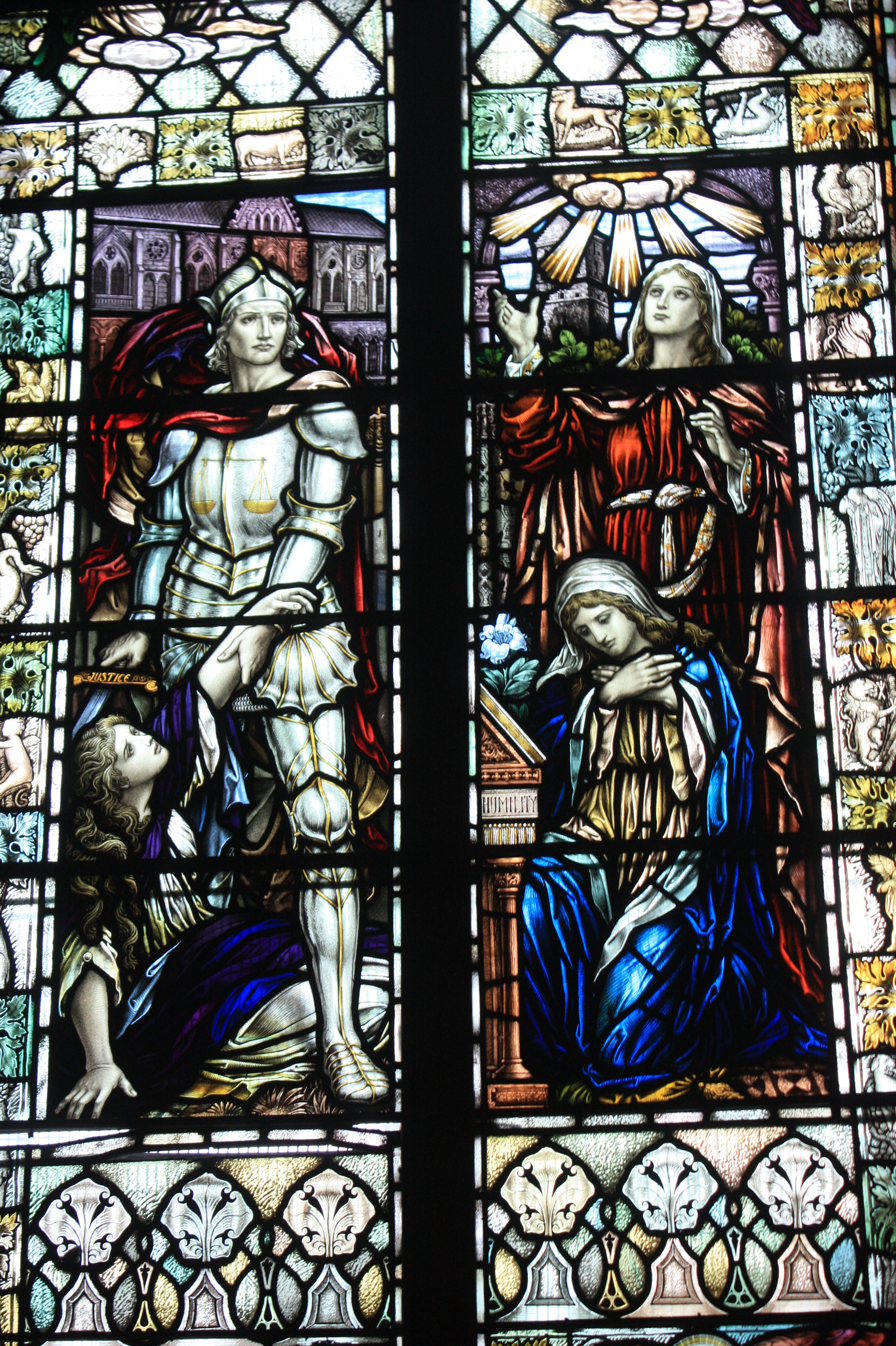
Stained glass window by Ballantine and Gardiner

St Serf's Church in the Scottish village of Dunning, Perth and Kinross is a Category A listed building largely dating to the early 19th century, but incorporating a 12th-century tower.

== History ==
The church dates to the 12th century, and has a forestair leading to the east gallery entrance that is dated 1687 on the lintel. The building was extensively remodelled by Alexander Bowie between 1808 and 1810. Stained-glass windows by Ballantine and Son and Ballantine and Gardiner were added between 1899 and 1910. The churchyard includes early stones dated 1623 and 1624.

The church was in use until 1972 but is now in the care of Historic Scotland. It is visible to the public at no charge but under supervision.

The building was used in the filming of the 2000 Scottish film Complicity.

== Dupplin Cross ==
The 9th-century Dupplin Cross is inside the church; it was placed there in 2002 after a protest to Historic Scotland at its removal from its original home in Dunning.

== See also ==
- List of Category A listed buildings in Perth and Kinross
