= Bridei V =

King of the Picts from 761 to 763

King of the Picts
- Reign: 761–763
- Predecessor: Óengus I
- Successor: Ciniod I
- House: Óengus
- Father: Fergusa

Bridei V (Gaelic: Bruide mac Fergusa) was king of the Picts from 761 until 763. He was the brother of Óengus, whom he succeeded as king. His death is recorded by the Annals of Ulster and the Annals of Tigernach.

== See also ==
- House of Óengus

Regnal titles
Preceded by Oengus I	King of the Picts; 761–763	Succeeded by Ciniod
