= Conall mac Áedáin =

Conall mac Áedáin was a king in Scotland in the years around 800. It is thought that he was a king, or sub-king, in Dál Riata.

He is mentioned once in the Annals of Ulster, for 807, when he defeated and killed Conall mac Taidg in Kintyre.

Conall is thought to be mentioned in the Duan Albanach: "The two years of Conall of glorious career, And the four of another Conall." The first is presumed to be Conall mac Taidg, the second Conall mac Áedáin. His reign is therefore reconstructed as beginning in 807 and ending in about 811.

He is thought to have been followed by Domnall mac Caustantín.
