= Talorc mac Achiuir =

Legendary King of the Picts from 387 to 412

King of the Picts
- Reign: 387–412
- Predecessor: Gartnait II
- Successor: Drest I

Talorc mac Achiuir is a legendary Pictish monarch known only from regnal lists.

== Discrepancies in sources ==
Multiple early sources state that the length of Talorc mac Achiuir's reign was 75 years long. However, this seems exaggerated and other sources state that it was 25. The names also have multiple variations in each source:

'Talorc' is also referred to as:

- Talore
- Tolorc
- Balarg
- Talarg
- Talargh
- Thalarger

With 'Achiuir' also being referred to as:

- Achivir
- Aiihiuir
- Keothere
- Keother
- Keocher
- Kecter

Regnal titles
Preceded by Gartnait II	King of the Picts; 387–412	Succeeded by Drest I
