= Drest VIII =

King of the Picts from 782 to 783

King of the Picts
- Reign: 782–783
- Predecessor: Talorc II
- Successor: Talorc III
- House: Óengus
- Father: Talorgan II

Drest son of Talorcan (Scottish Gaelic: Drest mac Talorgan), was king of the Picts from 782 until 783, succeeding his father Talorgan.

== See also ==
- House of Óengus

Regnal titles
Preceded by Talorc II	King of the Picts; 782–783	Succeeded by Talorc III
