= Uradech =

Legendary King of the Picts from 345 to 347

King of the Picts
- Reign: 345–347
- Predecessor: Canutulachama
- Successor: Gartnait II

Uradech (or Feradach) is a legendary fourth century Pictish monarch known only from regnal lists.

Regnal titles
Preceded by Canutulachama	King of the Picts; 345–347	Succeeded by Gartnait II
