= Canutulachama =

Legendary king of the Picts

King of the Picts
- Reign: 341–345
- Predecessor: Vipoig
- Successor: Uradech

Canutulachama (or Canutulahina) is a legendary fourth century Pictish monarch known only from regnal lists. The name is often listed as a proof that Pictish was a non-Indo-European language, but an etymology inside Indo-European was also suggested, including roots like Irish "tullach" (hillock).

Regnal titles
Preceded by Vipoig	King of the Picts; 341–345	Succeeded by Uradech
