= Dupplin Cross =

Coordinates: 56°18′45″N 3°35′14″W

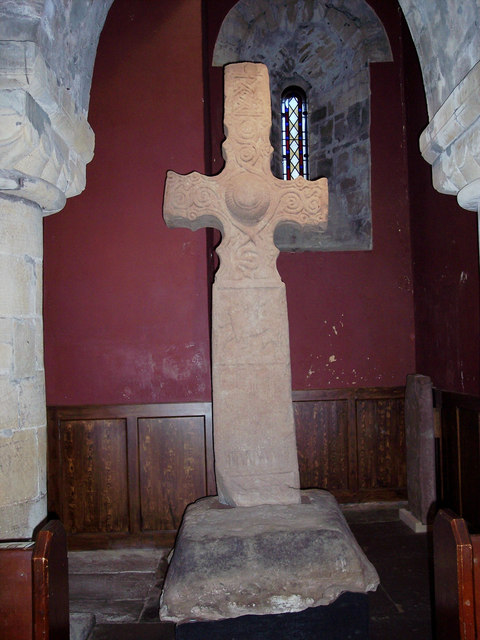
The Dupplin Cross in St Serf's Church, Dunning

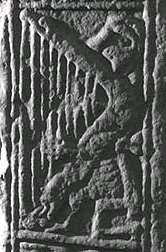
The harper on the Dupplin Cross, Scotland, circa 800 AD

The Dupplin Cross is a carved, monumental Pictish stone, which dates from around 800 AD. It was first recorded by Thomas Pennant in 1769, on a hillside in Strathearn, a little to the north of (and on the opposite bank of the River Earn from) Forteviot and Dunning. In 2002 it was placed in the care of Historic Scotland, and was placed for preservation under the 11th/12th-century tower of St Serf's Church, Dunning.

The Dupplin Cross is a high cross, that is a free-standing stone cross. While relatively common in Ireland, Northumbria and in Dál Riata, such crosses are rare survivals in the lands of the Picts, though fragments of shattered crosses (probably cast down during the 16th-century Reformation) show that a number once existed. In the 18th century a second cross, the Cross of Dronachy, was recorded as having stood on the lands of Invermay, south of Forteviot and also overlooking Forteviot, but having fallen and broken. The cross base survives in situ, but the records do not provide details of its exact form.

The cross is carved from Old Red Sandstone, and stands about 2.5 metres tall, 1 metre broad over the arms of the cross. It is carved with various scenes, religious, martial and traditional Pictish animal carvings. The cross contains a partially legible inscription, of which only the name CUSTANTIN FILIUS FIRCUS can be read. This name is taken as the Latin form of the early 9th-century Pictish king's Gaelic name Caustantín son of Fergus (fl. 793–820).

Since the inscription implies that the cross was carved either during, or shortly after, the reign of Caustantín, it is particularly important as giving a fixed point in the chronology of Pictish sculpture. It also indicates that Gaelic was spoken at the time as it uses the Gaelic personal name of his father in Latin.

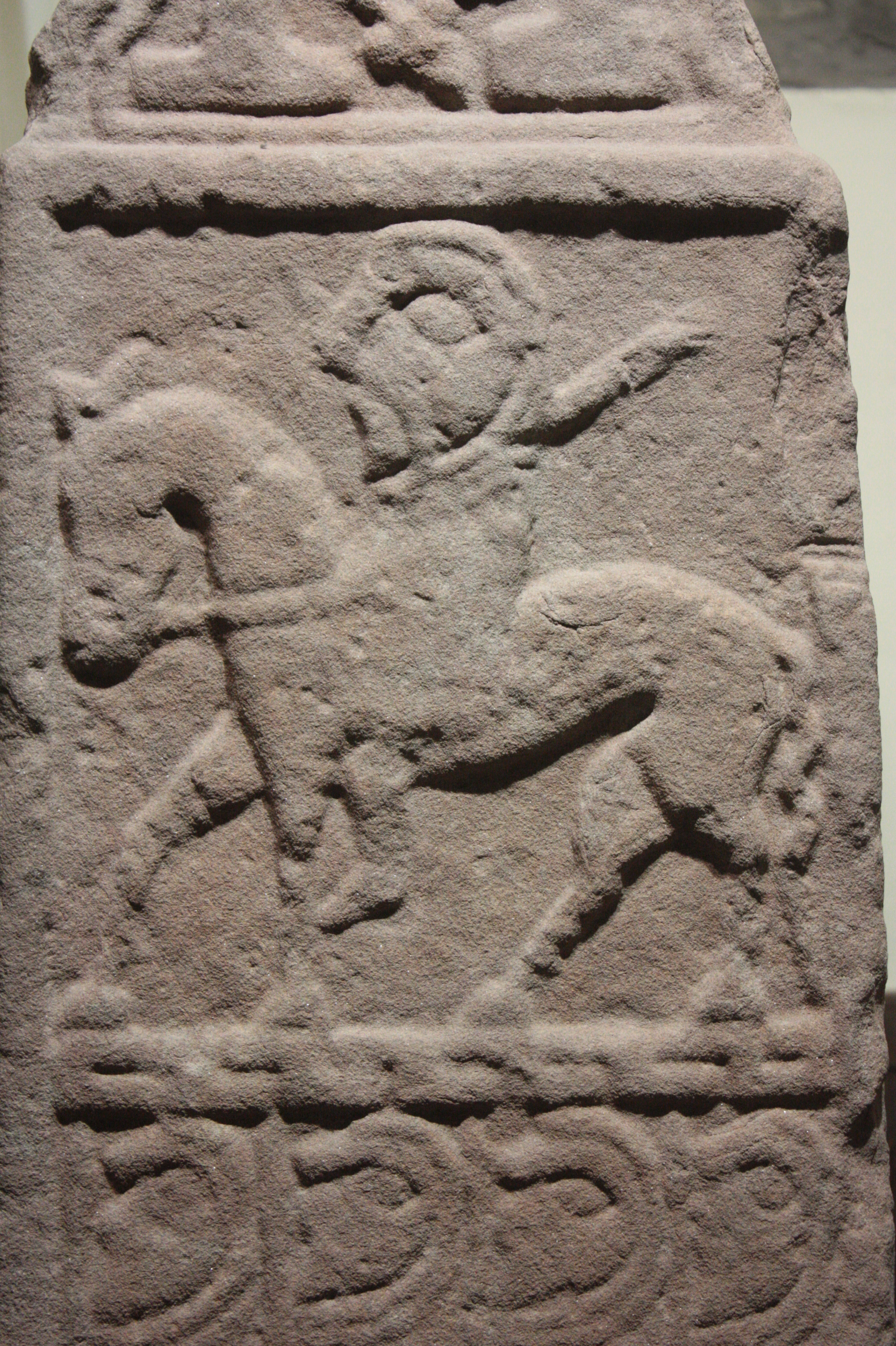
The Rider, Dupplin Cross

Other carved themes on the cross include a rider with an oversized head and ponytail showing him to be a man of authority. On the obverse a man fights bears with his bare hands. The sides include a man (probably David) playing a harp, and hunting dogs.
