= Talorgan II =

King of the Picts from 736 to 750

Talorcan son of Uurguist

King of the Picts
- Reign: 736–750
- Predecessor: Óengus I
- Successor: Bridei V
- House: Óengus

Talorcan son of Uurguist (Scottish Gaelic: Talorgen mac Óengusa) was a king of the Picts. The Annals of Ulster report the death of Dub Tholargg (Black Talorcen) king of the Picts on this side of the Mounth in 782. He is presumed to have been the son of Óengus mac Fergusa. He was succeeded by his son Drest.

== See also ==
- House of Óengus

Regnal titles
Preceded by Óengus I	King of the Picts; 736–750	Succeeded by Bridei V
