= James Ballantine =

Scottish artist and author (1806–1877)

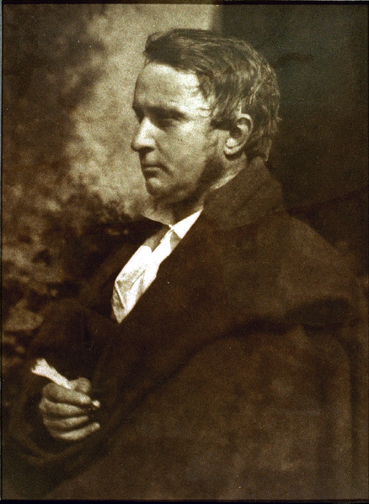
- James Ballantyne, c. 1845, by Hill & Adamson.
- Born: 11 June 1806; St Cuthbert's Parish, Edinburgh
- Died: 18 December 1877 (aged 71)
- Education: University of Edinburgh
- Known for: Artist and author

James Ballantine (11 June 1806 – 18 December 1877) was a Scottish artist and writer, known for his stained-glass windows and poetry.

== Early life and education ==
James Ballantine was born on 11 June 1806 in West Port, Edinburgh. His father was a brewer who died when he was 10. He received little education and what he did know came from his mother or being self-taught. In his early teens he was apprenticed to a house painter in Edinburgh.

Aged 20 he went to the University of Edinburgh.

== Glass painting ==
After graduating, Ballantine turned his attention to the art of painting on glass. He quickly achieved high eminence in his field with his business Ballantine and Allan, and got the contract for painting the windows of the House of Lords through a public competition.

His 1845 book A treatise of Stained Glass became a standard work.

His son, Alexander (1841–1906), later joined his stained-glass window business.

His works of stained glass included:

- House of Lords, London
- Main hall at Dunoon Burgh Hall
- St John's Kirk, Perth

== Writing ==
Ballantine started writing poetry at a young age and achieved success with his popular novel The Gaberlunzie's Wallet (1842). The Gaberlunzie, the dramatic adaptation of the novel, was staged at the Theatre Royal, Edinburgh, in June 1858, running for six nights.

== Death ==
He died on 18 December 1877 from a "congestion of the lungs" in Warrender Lodge, Meadows, Edinburgh.

== Selected works ==
=== Fiction and drama ===
- The Gaberlunzie's Wallet. 1842.Edinburgh : J. Menzies. 348pp
- The Miller of Deanhaugh . 1844. Edinburgh : J. Menzies. 312pp.
- The Gaberlunzie: a Scotch drama adapted from the novel of The Gaberlunzies Wallet. 1858. Edinburgh : J. Menzies. iv+(5-43)pp.

=== Verse and songs ===
- Poems. 1856. Edinburgh : T. Constable. viii+312pp.
- Verses for the Burns' centenary banquet, on the 25th January, 1859, in the Music Hall, Edinburgh. 1859. Edinburgh. 8pp.
- One Hundred Songs .. With melodies original & selected. 1866. J. S. Marr: Glasgow. v+209pp.
- Lilias Lee and other poems. 1871. William Blackwood and Sons. vi+276pp.

=== Other works ===
- Chronicle of the Hundredth Birthday of Robert Burns. Collected and edited by J. Ballantine [With a genealogical table]. 1859. Edinburgh & London. Fullarton & Co. vi+605pp.
- A Treatise on Painted Glass, shewing its applicability to every style of architecture. 1845. Chapman & Hall: London; John Menzies: Edinburgh. 51pp+8Plates.
- The Life of David Roberts, R.A. Compiled from his journals and other sources .. With etchings and facsimiles of pen-and-ink sketches by the artist. 1866. Edinburgh : Adam and Charles Black. xiv+255pp+ 9 etched plates+26 facsimiles of rough pen-and-ink sketches of pictures from Mr. Roberts' journal, portrait of Roberts and drawing of his birthplace.
- A Visit to Buxton. 1873. J. C. Bates: Buxton. 22pp.
- Sir James Falshaw, Bart .. Lord Provost of the City of Edinburgh, 1874-1877. 1910 Otto Schulze & Co.: Edinburgh. 25pp.

=== Contributions ===
- Essay on Ornamental Art as applicable to trade and manufactures. In. Leith (Samuel) The Tradesman's Book of Ornamental Designs. 1847.
- Lays and Lyrics of Scotland, arranged with new Symphonies and Accompaniments for the Pianoforte by J. Fulcher. With a historical epitome of Scottish Song by J. Ballantine and an appendix of notes historical, biographical, and critical compiled by the publishers 1870. Glasgow. Swan & Pentland. xi+344pp.
