= Poppleton manuscript =

14th century manuscript containing some of the earliest texts of Scottish history

The Poppleton manuscript is the name given to the fourteenth-century codex probably compiled by Robert of Poppleton, a Carmelite friar who was the Prior of Hulne, near Alnwick. The manuscript contains numerous works, such as a map of the world (with index), and works by Orosius, Geoffrey of Monmouth and Gerald of Wales. It is now in the Bibliothèque Nationale, Paris (Ms Latin 4126).

The manuscript is famous because it contains seven consecutive documents concerning medieval Scotland, some of which are unique to the manuscript, and regarded as important sources. The first six, at least, had probably been compiled previously in Scotland, in the early thirteenth century. They comprise:

1. de Situ Albanie; which appears to be an introduction to the following five or six texts. The Poppleton MS preserves the only copy of this.
2. Cronica de origine antiquorum Pictorum (i.e. Chronicle on the Origins of the Ancient Picts); part of the Pictish Chronicle, this is largely a pastiche of wider Latin learning regarding the Picts and Scots. It contains extracts from the Etymologiae of Isidore of Seville and Nennius's Historia Brittonum.
3. A Pictish King List; part of the Pictish Chronicle, this is a largely un-Gaelicized list of Pictish Kings, containing an opening mythological section not present in many other Pictish king lists. Unlike related Pictish king-lists, it gets cut off at the accession of Cináed mac Ailpín. It reveals its origins at Abernethy by preserving a spurious foundation "charter" for the monastery there, reputedly granted by King Nechtan (fl. early seventh century), whom it calls Nectonius magnus filius Uuirp.
4. Chronicle of the Kings of Alba; it is a short chronicle of the Kings of Alba, from the period of King Cináed mac Ailpín (d. 858) until the reign of King Cináed mac Maíl Coluim (r. d. 995). As for the de Situ Albanie, the Poppleton MS preserves the only copy.
5. A List of Dál Riatan and Scottish monarchs; this joined pair of king-lists starts from the legendary Fergus Mór mac Eirc, and ends with William I.
6. A genealogy of William I; this genealogy goes all the way back to Adam, via Gaidhel Glas. It is just a record or partial translation of a Gaelic genealogy, in which mac and meic have been replaced with filius and filii. Virtually all ancestors before David I have their names in the Middle Irish genitive form.
7. A foundation legend of St Andrews; it may not have been compiled by the author of de Situ Albanie in the thirteenth century, simply because it does not fit in with the logic presented by documents one to six, and is unrelated to the legend or topic is mentioned in de Situ Albanie.

The value of the manuscript has been shown in the publications of William Forbes Skene, Marjory Anderson and her husband Alan Orr Anderson. Dozens of articles have been written in the last half-century about various aspects of the Scottish content, although studies of the whole manuscript have been rarer.

== Bibliography ==
- Anderson, Alan Orr, Early Sources of Scottish History: AD 500-1286, Vol. 1, (Edinburgh, 1923)
- Anderson, Marjorie O., Kings and Kingship in Early Scotland, (Edinburgh, 1973), pp. 235–60
- Broun, Dauvit, "The Seven Kingdoms in De Situ Albanie: A Record of Pictish political geography or imaginary Map of ancient Alba?" in E.J. Cowan & R. Andrew McDonald (eds.), Alba: Celtic Scotland in the Medieval Era, (Edinburgh, 2000, rev. 2005), pp. 24–42
- Skene, William F., Chronicles of the Picts and Scots: And Other Memorials of Scottish History, (Edinburgh, 1867)
