= Sally Foster =

Scottish archaeologist and senior lecturer at the University of Stirling

Sally M. Foster FSA FSA Scot is a Scottish archaeologist and senior lecturer at the University of Stirling. She specialises in the archaeology of Scotland, particularly the Picts and their neighbours in the early medieval period.

== Education and career ==
Foster studied at University College London and graduated in 1984 with a degree in medieval archaeology. She completed her doctoral studies under Leslie Alcock at the University of Glasgow. She was awarded her PhD in 1990 with a thesis entitled Aspects of the Later Atlantic Iron Age. She then worked in the cultural heritage sector, as an inspector for the Royal Commission on the Ancient and Historical Monuments of Scotland and subsequently Historic Scotland. Returning to academic archaeology in 2010, she was first appointed a lecturer at the University of Glasgow and moved to the University of Stirling in 2014.

Foster previously chaired the National Committee on Carved Stones in Scotland and served as a trustee of the Society of Antiquaries of Scotland and the Kilmartin Glen Museum Company. She has previously served as the secretary of the Medieval Europe Research Community and an honorary editor of the International Journal of Medieval Archaeology. She is a senior fellow of the Higher Education Academy, a fellow of the Society of Antiquaries of London, a fellow of the Society of Antiquaries of Scotland, a member of the Chartered Institute of Archaeologists, the Association of Critical Heritage Studies and the European Association of Archaeologists. She is also a director of the Tarbat Discovery Centre.

== Selected publications ==
- Foster, Sally M (ed) 1998 The St Andrews Sarcophagus: a Pictish Masterpiece and its International Connections Dublin Fours Courts Press DA 777.3
- Foster, Sally M (2006) Maeshowe and the Heart of Neolithic Orkney Edinburgh: Historic Scotland.
- Foster, Sally M (ed. 2014) Picts, Gaels and Scots. Early Historic Scotland, 3rd edition. Edinburgh: Birlinn Ltd. (2004 edition published by Batsford)
