= Gearóid Mac Niocaill =

English scholar & interpreter of late medieval Irish tracts (1932-2004)

Gearóid Mac Niocaill (1932–2004) was one of the foremost twentieth-century scholars and interpreters of late medieval Irish tracts.

== Life ==
Gearóid was born in Hull, England in 1932 to an Irish mother. His lifelong work in the Irish language built upon an earlier tradition of involvement in the Irish revival by English-born scholars like Robin Flower (Bláithín) and George Thomson (Seoirse Mac Tomáis). Mac Niocaill graduated with a BA in Latin and French from the University of Leeds in 1953. He presently travelled to Ireland where he was awarded a post-graduate scholarship by the School of Celtic Studies in the Dublin Institute for Advanced Studies. In 1956 he was given responsibility for manuscripts in the National Library of Ireland. He submitted a dissertation entitled Cáipéisí i Dli i nGaeilge 1493–1621 in 1962 for which he was duly awarded his doctorate. Three years later, in 1965, Mac Niocaill was made an assistant professor in the School of Celtic Studies at the Dublin Institute for Advanced Studies.

Mac Niocaill was professor of history at NUI Galway from 1977 until his retirement in 1997. His publication of key late medieval manuscripts in Latin and, especially, Irish restricted his academic audience but affirmed his commitment to the Irish language. Nonetheless, his Na Buirgéisi, xii-xv aois (1964), written in Irish and Latin, is one of the most widely cited and indispensable texts on the burgesses and boroughs in late medieval Ireland. The growing school of literature examining the geographical and archaeological nature of Hiberno-Norman towns have utilised this two-volume text in order to understand the constitutional structure of these towns.
