= Marjorie Ogilvie Anderson =

Scottish historian

- Born: Marjorie Ogilvie Cunningham; 9 February 1909; St Andrews
- Died: 27 May 2002 (aged 93)
- Occupations: Historian and paleographer
- Spouse: Alan Orr Anderson

Marjorie Ogilvie Anderson (née Cunningham) (9 February 1909 – 27 May 2002) was a Scottish historian and paleographer.

== Early years ==
Born Marjorie Ogilvie Cunningham in St Andrews, she attended St Leonards School there before studying English at Lady Margaret Hall, Oxford University.

== Career ==
After graduation she joined Alan Orr Anderson, whose eyesight was failing, as his paleographer and assistant. They married in 1932. Alan Anderson died in 1958, but Anderson continued to publish on early Scottish subjects, most notably her Kings and Kingship in Early Scotland and her revision of Early Sources of Scottish History, the standard collection of source material on Scottish History to 1286, written by Alan Anderson and first published in 1922.

== Honours ==
Anderson received an honorary DLitt from the University of Saint Andrews in 1973. A festschrift in her honour was published in 2000.

== Death ==
She died in 2002.

== Select bibliography ==
- (editor) Anderson, Alan Orr, Scottish Annals from English Chroniclers: AD 500–1286, 2nd edition, Stamford, 1990.
- (with Alan Orr Anderson) Adomnan's Life of Columba, Edinburgh 1961 (revised Oxford, 1991)
- (with Alan Orr Anderson) The Chronicle of Holyrood, Edinburgh, 1938.
- Kings and Kingship in Early Scotland, Edinburgh, 1973 (revised Edinburgh, 1980)
