= Fergus mac Echdach =

King of Dál Riata

Fergus mac Echdach was king of Dál Riata (modern western Scotland) from about 778 until 781.

He succeeded Áed Find. He is stated to have been a son of Eochaid mac Echdach, and thus a brother of Áed. Some much later sources make him a son of Áed, but this is not credited by modern studies. His death is noticed in 781 by the Annals of Ulster.

The next reported king of Dál Riata is Donncoirce.

Preceded by Áed Find	King of Dál Riata; 778–781	Succeeded by perhaps Donncoirce
