= Annals of Tigernach =

Manuscript chronicling the history of Ireland

Annals of Inisfallen
- Language: Latin and Old and Middle Irish
- Genre: Non-fiction
- Publication place: Ireland

The Annals of Tigernach (abbr. AT, Irish: Annála Tiarnaigh) are chronicles probably originating in Clonmacnoise, Ireland. The language is a mixture of Latin and Old and Middle Irish.

Many of the pre-historic entries come from the 12th-century MS, Rawlinson B 502. However, the real importance of the chronicle is for the period 489–766, 973–1003 and 1018–1178. These three fragments survive from the 14th-century MS Rawlinson B 488. The coverage of the period 766 to 973 is lost, but is thought to survive in abbreviated form in the Chronicon Scottorum (abbr. CT). The latter is defective for the period 718 to 804, but as much of its content is derived from the hypothetical Chronicle of Ireland (itself partly derived from the Iona Chronicle), of which the Annals of Ulster (abbr. AU) and Annals of Inisfallen (abbr. AI) are also derived, we have some idea of what the entries contained. Kathleen Hughes postulates that AU and AT diverged from the Chronicle of Ireland sometime before the year 913.

The chronicle owes its modern name to Tigernach Ua Braín (d. 1088), abbot of Clonmacnoise, but this does not mean that he was also its author. A note added to the entry for 1088, the year of his death, in Rawlinson B 488 states that the text was written by Tigernach up to that point. If he was not merely the scribe of the original text copied by the 14th-century scribe, it may mean that he was one of the annalists responsible for the work.

== See also ==
- Irish annals
- The Chronicle of Ireland
- Gilla Críst Ua Máel Eóin
- Banbáin Os Cach
- Chronicon Scotorum

== Editions ==
- Annals of Tigernach, ed. & partial trans. by Whitley Stokes (1895–1897). "The Annals of Tigernach". Revue Celtique. 16–18. (= Vol. 16 (1895), p. 374-419; 17 (1896), p. 6-33, 116-263, 337-420; 18 (1897), p. 9-59, 150-197, 267-303, 390-391). Edition available from CELT and Full PDF at Internet Archive. Full translation by Gearóid Mac Niocaill (2010), The Annals of Tigernach. Unpublished electronic file ed. by Emer Purcell and Donnchadh Ó Corráin for UCC.
- O'Conor, Charles. Rerum Hibernicarum scriptores veteres. 4 vols. Buckingham, 1814-26. Superseded by Stokes' edition. Available from Google Books.

== Translation ==
- Mac Niocaill, Gearóid (2010), The Annals of Tigernach. Unpublished electronic file edited by Emer Purcell and Donnchadh Ó Corráin for University College Cork.
