= Pictish Chronicle =

Kings of the Picts

The Pictish Chronicle are a group of documents which originated starting in the 900s and describe the legendary kings and mythical history of the Picts, a group which lived in what is now northern Scotland. The documents begin many thousands of years before history was recorded in Pictland and end after the Picts had been enveloped by Scotland. Modern scholars believe the Pictish Chronicle is a blend of genuine historical data roughly contemporary to the documents' creation, along with exaggerated royal propaganda and pseudo-historical or mythical origin stories.

== Version A ==
There are several versions of the Pictish Chronicle. The so-called "A" text is probably the oldest, the fullest, and seems to have fewer errors than other versions. The original (albeit lost) manuscript seems to date from the early years of the reign of Kenneth II of Scotland (who ruled Scotland from 971 until 995) since he is the last king mentioned and the chronicler does not know the length of his reign. This chronicle survives only in the 14th century Poppleton Manuscript.

It is in three parts:

1. Cronica de origine antiquorum Pictorum, an account of the origins of the Picts, mostly from the Etymologies of Isidore of Seville.
2. A list of Pictish kings.
3. Chronicle of the Kings of Alba.

It is evident that the latter two sections were originally written in Gaelic since a few Gaelic words have not been translated into Latin.

== Version D ==
By the 12th century, Giric had acquired legendary status as liberator of the Scottish church from Pictish oppression and, fantastically, as conqueror of Ireland and most of England. As a result, Giric was known as Gregory the Great. (Giric's conquests appear as Bernicia, rather than Ireland (Hibernia), in some versions.)

This tale appears in the variant of the Chronicle of the Kings of Alba which is interpolated in Andrew of Wyntoun's Orygynale Cronykil of Scotland.

This says that Áed reigned one year and was killed by his successor Giric in Strathallan. (Other king lists have the same report.)

Here Giric, or Grig, is named "Makdougall", son of Dúngal.

List "D", which may be taken as typical, contains this account of Giric:

Giric, Dungal's son, reigned for twelve years; and he died in Dundurn, and was buried in Iona. He subdued to himself all Ireland, and nearly [all] England; and he was the first to give liberty to the Scottish church, which was in servitude up to that time, after the custom and fashion of the Picts.

This account is not found in the Poppleton Manuscript. The lists known as "D", "F", "I", "K", and "N", contain this version and is copied by the Chronicle of Melrose.

The Latin material interpolated in Andrew of Wyntoun's Orygynale Cronykl states that King Dub was murdered at Forres, and links this to an eclipse of the sun which can be dated to 20 July 966.

== See also ==
- The Prophecy of Berchán
- Duan Albanach
- Senchus fer n-Alban
- Chronicle of the Kings of Alba
- Annals of Ulster
- List of Kings of the Picts

== Bibliography ==
- A.O. Anderson: Early Sources of Scottish History (Vol. I) (1922)
- M.O. Anderson: Kings & Kingship in Early Scotland (ISBN 0-7011-1930-6) (1973)
- H.M. Chadwick: Early Scotland (1949)
- B.T. Hudson: Kings of Celtic Scotland (ISBN 0-313-29087-3) (1994)
