= Alan Orr Anderson =

Scottish historian

- Born: 1879; Scotland
- Died: 1958 (aged 78–79)
- Occupations: Historian and compiler
- Spouse: Marjorie Ogilvie Anderson

Alan Orr Anderson (1879–1958) was a Scottish historian and compiler. The son of Rev. John Anderson and Ann Masson, he was born in 1879. He was educated at Royal High School, Edinburgh, and the University of Edinburgh.

In 1908, after five years of work sponsored by the Carnegie Trust, he published Scottish Annals from English Chroniclers, a reasonably comprehensive compilation of sources about Scottish history before 1286 written either in England or by chroniclers born in England. Fourteen years later, he was able to publish the 2-volume work entitled Early Sources of Scottish History, A.D. 500 to 1286, a similar but larger collection of sources, this time taken from non-English (mostly Gaelic) material. To a certain extent, the latter work overlapped with the compilations published by Skene's Chronicles of the Picts and Scots (Edinburgh, 1867), but both of Anderson's compilations differed from Skene's in that all were translated into English.

Years of reading difficult manuscripts in dull light were perhaps the cause of Anderson's failing eyesight, and for a large period of time, he relied on his graduate student (subsequently his wife) Marjorie Cunningham to do much of the readings. He died 9 December 1958.

Today, most scholars working in early Scottish history regard Anderson's three volumes as among their most essential scholarly possessions. As a result, much of the course of early Scottish historiography was set by what Anderson chose to publish or chose not to publish. In 1990 and 1991, the compilations were reissued by the Stamford-based enterprise Paul Watkins Publishing.

== Bibliography ==
- Anderson, Alan Orr, Early Sources of Scottish History: AD 500–1286, 2 vols, Edinburgh: Oliver & Boyd, 1922; republished, Marjorie Anderson (ed.) Stamford, 1990
- Anderson, Alan Orr, Scottish Annals from English Chroniclers: AD 500–1286, London: David Nutt, 1908; republished, Marjorie Anderson (ed.) Stamford, 1991
