= Timeline of Scottish history =

List of significant events in the history of Scotland

This is a timeline of Scottish history, comprising important legal and territorial changes and political events in Scotland and its predecessor states. See also Timeline of prehistoric Scotland.

To read about the background to many of these events, see History of Scotland. More information can also be found in the list of Scottish monarchs, list of British monarchs, list of first ministers of Scotland, and list of years in Scotland.

== 1st century ==
Year	Date	Event
83/84		Romans defeat Caledonians at the Battle of Mons Graupius.

== 2nd century ==
Year	Date	Event
122		Romans construct Hadrian's Wall.
143		Romans construct Antonine Wall.
163		Romans withdraw south to Trimontium and Hadrian's Wall.

== 3rd century ==
Year	Date	Event
300		The term Pict is first recorded in describing the federated tribes invaded by Constantius Chlorus.

== 4th century ==
Year	Date	Event
397		Traditional date at which Saint Ninian establishes a Christian mission at Whithorn.

== 5th century ==
Year	Date	Event
470		Votadini peoples form the kingdom of Gododdin in the region north of the River Tweed.

== 6th century ==
Year	Date	Event
547		Angles capture the Northumbrian fortress at Bamburgh and found the kingdom of Bernicia.
563		Saint Columba founds a monastery at Iona and begins his mission to the northern Picts.
574		Áedán mac Gabráin begins reign over the Gaelic kingdom of Dál Riata.
575		Western Scotland is granted independence from the Irish Dalriada, after a convention at Drum Ceatt near Derry.
580		Riderch I of Alt Clut rules region later known as the kingdom of Strathclyde.
584		Bruide, son of Maelchon, dies.

== 7th century ==
Year	Date	Event
604		Æthelfrith unites Bernicia and Deira to form the kingdom of Northumbria.
638		Northumbrians capture Edinburgh from Gododdin.
680		Trumwine Bishop of Abercorn.
681		Bruide mac Bili, King of Fortriu, campaigns against Orkney.
685		Pictish King Bruide mac Bili defeats Ecgfrith of Northumbria at the Battle of Dun Nechtain, halting the northern expansion of Northumbria.
693		Bruide mac Bili dies.
697		Bruide mac Der-Ilei among the signatories of the Cáin Adomnáin.

== 8th century ==
Year	Date	Event
717		Nechtan mac Der-Ilei expels Ionan clergy from Pictland and adopts Roman usages with the aid of Bishop Curetán; masons sent by Abbot Ceolfrid of Monkwearmouth-Jarrow Priory help build stone churches at Restenneth, Rosemarkie and elsewhere in eastern Scotland.
724		Drust and Nechtan mac Der-Ilei fight civil war (to 729).
732		Death of Nechtan mac Der-Ilei; Óengus mac Fergusa becomes King of the Picts.
735		Óengus mac Fergusa, King of the Picts, campaigns against Dál Riata, and seizes and burns the royal centre of Dunadd.
736		Battle of Cnoc Coirpi between Fortriu and Dál Riata.
741		Battle of Druimm Cathmail between Fortriu and Dál Riata; the "smiting of Dál Riata", in which Dál Riata is subdued by Óengus mac Fergusa.
747		St Andrews founded by this time, death of Abbot Túathalán.
750		Picts defeated by Britons at the Battle of Catohic.
756		Óengus mac Fergusa allied with the English of Northumbria attacks the Britons; the English army is destroyed.
761		Death of Óengus mac Fergusa.
763		Battle takes place in Fortriu between Ciniod and Áed Find; result unknown.
778		Death of Áed Find, King of Dál Riata.
794		Annals of Ulster report the "wasting" of "all the islands of Britain by gentiles [Vikings]".

== 9th century ==
Year	Date	Event
802		Iona burned by Vikings.
806		The monasteries under Iona are attacked by Vikings, killing 68 monks.
820		Death of Caustantín mac Fergusa.
829		Abbot Diarmait, abbot of Iona, goes to Alba with relics of St Columba.
831		Diarmait of Iona goes to Ireland with relics of St Columba.
839		Eóganan mac Óengusa and his brother Bran killed in battle with Vikings, end of dominance of Fortriu.
858		Death of Kenneth mac Alpin, King of the Picts; "union of Picts and Scots" traditionally dated from his reign.
870		Alt Clut—Dumbarton Rock — captured by the Norse-Gael or Viking leaders Amlaíb Conung and Ímar after a six-month of siege.
878		Kenneth mac Alpin's son Áed killed; Giric becomes king.
889		Death of Giric; Domnall mac Causantín, grandson of Kenneth, becomes king.
890		The Strathclyde Britons are exiled to the Gwynedd in Wales.

== 10th century ==
Year	Date	Event
900		Causantín mac Áeda succeeds Domnall mac Causantín.
937		Battle of Brunanburh English victory in 937 by the army of Æthelstan, King of England, and his brother Edmund over the combined armies of Olaf III Guthfrithson, the Norse-Gael King of Dublin, Constantine II, King of Scots, and Owen I, King of Strathclyde.
940		Saint Catroe of Metz leaves Scotland.
943		Causantín mac Áeda abdicates to become a culdee at St Andrews.
952		Death of Causantín mac Áeda.
954		Indulf captures Edinburgh from Northumbria.

== 11th century ==
Year	Date	Event
1058		After defeating Mac Bethad and Lulach, Máel Coluim III is proclaimed king.
1012		Battle of Cruden Bay

== 12th century ==
Year	Date	Event
1124		David I becomes king and introduces the feudal system of landholding to much of Scotland.
1128		David I founds Holyrood Abbey at Edinburgh.
1136		Glasgow Cathedral (St Kentigern's, begun 1123) consecrated in the presence of David I.
1153		Somerled sacks Glasgow and its vicinity.
1156		Somerled defeats the Norse King of Mann and the Isles, establishing his own semi-independent rule as ri Innse Gall-King of the Hebrides.
1164		Somerled is defeated by Malcolm IV in the Battle of Renfrew.
1174		William I signs the Treaty of Falaise in which he swears allegiance to Henry II of England.

== 13th century ==
Year	Date	Event
1234		Galloway's independent existence ends with the death of Alan, Lord of Galloway.
1237		Southern border of Scotland established in the Treaty of York.
1263		Scots defeat Norwegians in the Battle of Largs.
1266		Norway cedes the Hebrides and Isle of Man to Scotland in the Treaty of Perth.
1290		Margaret, Maid of Norway dies in Orkney.
1292		Edward I of England intervenes in Scottish affairs and grants the Scottish throne to John Balliol.
1297		Andrew de Moravia and William Wallace lead the Scots to victory over England at Stirling Bridge.

== 14th century ==
Year	Date	Event
1305		William Wallace is executed in London.
1314		Robert the Bruce defeats the English at Bannockburn.
1320		Nobles assert Scottish independence in the Declaration of Arbroath.
1328		Treaty of Northampton. England recognises Scottish independence.
1329		Death of Robert the Bruce. His 5-year-old son, David II succeeds him.
1371		Robert II becomes first Stewart king.

== 15th century ==
Year	Date	Event
1402		English defeat Scots in the Battle of Nesbit Moor and the Battle of Humbleton Hill.
1413		Foundation of the University of St Andrews.
1451		Establishment of the University of Glasgow.
1468		Denmark cedes Orkney and Shetland from Norway to Scotland.
1488		James IV crowned after death of his father James III of Scotland in/after a rebellion—the Battle of Sauchieburn.
1493		Lordship of the Isles abolished. In 1540 the title was reserved to the crown.
1495		Creation of the University of Aberdeen (King's College).
1496		Education Act 1496 makes education compulsory for barons and wealthy landowners.

== 16th century ==
Year	Date	Event
1513		James IV and thousands of Scots are killed at Battle of Flodden.
1532		Creation of the College of Justice and the Court of Session.
1542		Death of James V.
1544		Burning of Edinburgh by an English army
1547		Battle of Pinkie during the War of the Rough Wooing.
1559		John Knox returns to Scotland from Geneva to promote Calvinism.
1560		Parliament legislates Protestant Reformation of the Church of Scotland.
1561		Mary, Queen of Scots returns from France.
1566		Baptism of James VI at Stirling
1568		Mary, Queen of Scots flees to England following the defeat of her army at the Battle of Langside.
1579		James VI takes over government from his regent, James Douglas.
1582		Establishment of the University of Edinburgh by royal charter.
1587		Mary is beheaded by the order of Queen Elizabeth I of England.
1589		James VI marries Anne of Denmark in Oslo.
1590		Entry and coronation of Anne of Denmark in Edinburgh
1592		James VI enacts the "Golden Act" recognising the power of Presbyterianism within the Scottish church.
1594		Masque at the baptism of Prince Henry in Stirling

== 17th century ==
Year	Date	Event
1603		The Union of the Crowns: James VI of Scotland becomes James I of England.
1614		John Napier invents logarithms and publishes a book promoting their use in mathematics.
1618		James VI forces episcopacy on the Church of Scotland through the Five Articles of Perth.
1625		Charles I of England, Scotland and Ireland is crowned.
1633		Education Act 1633 ordains a school in every parish (partially successful).
1638		Scottish Covenanters rebel against Charles I.
1639		The First Bishops' War.
1640		The Second Bishops' War.
1642		The First English Civil War started.
1643		The Solemn League and Covenant promises Scots army to aid English parliamentarians against the king.
1646		The First English Civil War ended.
1648		The Second English Civil War started.
1649		The Second English Civil War ended. Charles I is executed—ending the monarchy until 1660.
1649		The Third English Civil War started.
1650		Southern Scotland occupied by the English Commonwealth's New Model Army following Scottish defeats at the Battle of Dunbar 1650 and the Battle of Hamilton during the Third English Civil War
1651	3 September	Battle of Worcester was a victory for New Model Army over the last major Royalist field army. Most of the Royalist officers and men who fought at Worcester were Scottish. For the next ten years, apart from some mopping up operations and a few insurrections, (all of which were easily suppressed) there was not further military resistance to rule from London.
1651		The Third English Civil War ended.
1654	5 May	Oliver Cromwell issued a proclamation at the Mercat Cross in Edinburgh. Oliver Cromwell was the Protector of England Ireland and Scotland, that Scotland was united with the Commonwealth of England (Tender of Union) and there was a general pardon with some exceptions for the people of Scotland for any actions taken during the Wars of the Three Kingdoms (Cromwell's Act of Grace).
1660	14 May	The monarchy is restored in Scotland and Scotland resumes its status as a separate kingdom.
1661	May	Four men were executed for high treason for their actions against the Crown during the Wars of the Three Kingdoms. Archibald Campbell, 8th Earl of Argyll, James Guthrie, William Govan were all executed in May 1661 (the fourth Archibald Johnston, Lord Warriston fled abroad but returned to Scotland and was executed on 22 July 1663).
1661	6 September	The restoration of the Episcopacy was proclaimed by the Privy Council of Scotland.
1662		During the parliamentary session the Church of Scotland was restored as the national Church and all office-holders were required to renounce the Covenant.
1662	9 September	The Scottish parliament passed the Act of indemnity and oblivion. It was a general pardon for most types of crime that may have been committed by Scots, between 1 January 1637 and before 1 September 1660, during what the Act called "the late troubles" (the Wars of the Three Kingdoms and the Interregnum).
1679		James, Duke of Monmouth defeats Covenanters at the Battle of Bothwell Brig.
1689		Jacobite rising of 1689 Highlanders defeat army of William III at Killiecrankie, but are halted at Battle of Dunkeld.
1689		The Claim of Right and the re-establishment of Presbyterianism.
1692		The Massacre of Glencoe.
1695		The Bank of Scotland is created by an Act of the Parliament.
1696		Education Act 1696 ordains a school in every parish (successful; act governs education until the 1872 act).
1698		The Darien scheme was an unsuccessful attempt by the Kingdom of Scotland to establish a colony called "New Caledonia" on the Isthmus of Panama in the 1690s

== 18th century ==
Year	Date	Event
1707		The Union of the Parliaments: the Acts of Union are passed by both the Scottish and English parliaments.
1715		Jacobite rising of 1715.
1745		Jacobite rising of 1745.
1746		The Battle of Culloden ends the last Jacobite rising.
1748		David Hume publishes An Enquiry Concerning Human Understanding.
1754		Joseph Black discovers "fixed air" (carbon dioxide).
1768		The Encyclopædia Britannica First Edition commences publication.
1769		James Watt patents idea for separate condensing chamber in the steam engine.
1775		Passage of the Colliers and Salters (Scotland) Act 1775 commences the removal of life bondage of coal and salt workers.
1776		Adam Smith publishes The Wealth of Nations.

== 19th century ==
Year	Date	Event
1802		John Playfair publishes summary of James Hutton's theories of geology.
1805		The Glasgow Herald newspaper first published.
1817		The Scotsman newspaper first published.
1820		The "Radical War".
1822		Visit of King George IV to Scotland organized by Sir Walter Scott.
1832		The Reform Act enlarges the franchise.
1843		The Disruption in the Church of Scotland (over the issue of patronage).
1846		Beginning of the ten-year Highland Potato Famine.
1847		The United Presbyterian Church of Scotland is established.
1864		James Clerk Maxwell presents equations describing electromagnetic fields.
1874		Patronage abolished in the Church of Scotland.
1878		Collapse of the City of Glasgow Bank.
1879		William Ewart Gladstone conducts the Midlothian campaign as part of a political comeback.
1879		The Tay Bridge disaster.
1885		Creation of the Scottish Office and the post of Secretary for Scotland, later Secretary of State for Scotland.
1890		Opening of the Forth Railway Bridge.
1896		Opening of the Glasgow Subway.

== 20th century ==
Year	Date	Event
1919	31 January	The Battle of George Square
1929		The Church of Scotland and the United Free Church of Scotland unite.
1934		Scottish National Party founded.
1938		The Empire Exhibition, Scotland is held at Bellahouston Park, Glasgow.
1941		The Clydebank Blitz (13–15 March).
1943		Creation of the North of Scotland Hydro-Electric Board to bring electricity to all parts of the Highlands and Islands.
1945		First Scottish Nationalist MP is elected.
1947		Nationalisation of the railways – the Scottish Region of British Railways is created.
1947		The first Edinburgh International Festival is held.
1950		The Stone of Destiny is removed from Westminster Abbey.
1957		Scottish Television starts broadcasting.
1968		The General Assembly of the Church of Scotland permits the ordination of women as ministers.
1975		Local government reorganisation (replacing Counties and Burghs for administrative purposes with Regions and Districts).
1978		Launch of BBC Radio Scotland.
1979		Referendum to create a Scottish Assembly wins a majority but fails to win 40% of electorate. Act is therefore repealed without being put into effect.
1988		Terrorists blow up Pan Am Flight 103 over Lockerbie with the loss of 270 lives, including 11 residents of the town.
1995		Local government reorganisation (replacing the Regions and Districts with single-tier councils).
1996		The Stone of Destiny is permanently returned to Scotland, to be housed in Edinburgh Castle.
1997		Newly elected Labour UK Government under the leadership of Scots-born Prime Minister Tony Blair legislates for a referendum on a devolved Scottish Parliament which is passed by a large majority.
1999		A Scottish Parliament sits for the first time in 272 years. Donald Dewar of the Scottish Labour Party elected as First Minister and forms Scottish Executive in coalition with the Scottish Liberal Democrats.

== 21st century ==
Year	Date	Event
2004	9 October	Opening of the new Scottish Parliament Building.
2007		The Scottish National Party become the largest party in the Scottish Parliament and forms a minority government. Alex Salmond becomes the First Minister of Scotland, the first nationalist politician to serve as first minister.
2011		The Scottish National Party under Alex Salmond gain an overall majority of the Scottish Parliament.
2013		The Church of Scotland's ruling General Assembly votes to allow actively gay men and women to become ministers.
2014	18 September	Scotland has a referendum on regaining national independence. The result is to remain a country of the UK, by 55% to 45%.
2014	19 September	Alex Salmond announces his resignation as first minister following defeat in the independence referendum the day prior.
2014	20 November	Nicola Sturgeon becomes first minister and leader of the Scottish National Party (SNP), becoming the first female politician to serve as first minister of Scotland and leader of the SNP.
2015		The Scottish National Party wins 50.0% of the popular vote in Scotland in the UK General Election, securing 56 out of the 59 seats in Scotland.
2022	8 September	The longest reigning monarch of the United Kingdom, Elizabeth II, dies at Balmoral Castle in Aberdeenshire.
2023	15 February	Nicola Sturgeon announces resignation as First Minister of Scotland and leadership of the Scottish National Party.
2023	28 March	Humza Yousaf is elected as the First Minister of Scotland and new leader of Scottish National Party in the first contested leadership election in the SNP in nearly twenty years.
2024	4 July	The Scottish Labour Party wins 40% of the popular vote in Scotland in the UK General Election and became the largest party in the UK Parliament.
2025	23 January	The Scottish Government send an emergency alert to the public ahead of Storm Éowyn. The alert was sent to the mobile phones of around 4.5 million people. The Scottish Government Resilience Room (SGoRR) is activated by first minister John Swinney to co-ordinate the governments response to the approaching storm.
2025	24 January	Storm Éowyn hits the country. The Met Office issued a rare Red weather warning for strong winds. Winds in excess of 100mph were recorded around the country, and was described at the "worst storm to hit Scotland in 13 years".

== See also ==
- Kings of Scotland family tree
- Timeline of British history
- Timeline of prehistoric Scotland
