= Origins of the Kingdom of Alba =

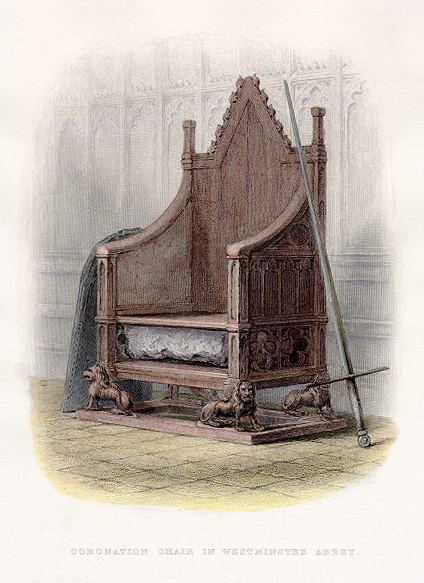
The Stone of Scone in the Coronation Chair at Westminster Abbey, 1855, was the ceremonial coronation stone of Scotland's Gaelic kings, similar to the Irish Lia Fáil.

The origins of the Kingdom of Alba pertain to the origins of the Kingdom of Alba, or the Gaelic Kingdom of Scotland, either as a mythological event or a historical process, during the Early Middle Ages.

== Origin paradigms ==
=== Medieval version ===
The origins of the Scots have been the subject of numerous speculations over the centuries, including some extravagant ones, like the one made by Walter Bower, abbot of Inchcolm Abbey, in his Scotichronicon, in which he argued that the Scots were descended from an Egyptian pharaoh via the legendary princess Scota, who arrived in Scotland after traveling to Iberia and Ireland. The traditional origin legends in Scotland were influenced by the Historia Regum Britanniae, the Lebor Gabála Érenn and the Historia Brittonum. Ultimately, such conceptualizations can be derived from Virgil's Aeneid and the Bible.

In the Life of St Cathróe of Metz, the hagiographer recounts the mythological origin of the saint's people, the Gaels. The hagiographer recounts that they landed in the vicinity of Cruachan Feli - called the Mountain of Ireland. He recounts that the Gaels conquered Ireland after a series of battles with the Picts (here Pictanes). They followed up their conquest of Ireland by invading Britain, conquering Iona before conquering the cities of Rigmonath (=Cennrigmonaid; i.e. St Andrews) and Bellathor (=Cinnbelathoir; an unidentified Scoto-Pictish palace). Afterwards, their commander - a Spartan called Nel (=Niall) - named the land and people after his Egyptian wife Scota. The tale is astonishingly important, because it dates to about 980, an extremely early date, and has Scottish sources. Indeed, the saint himself is Scottish, born into the nobility. According to the Life, he was educated in Armagh, before returning to Scotland and entering the service of King Constantine II (Causantín mac Áeda). Constantine gave Cathróe conduct to the court of King Dyfnwal of Strathclyde, and from there made his way to Viking England, and finally, the continent.

Medieval Scottish genealogies trace the origin of the Scots to Fergus Mór mac Eirc, the legendary founder of Dál Riata. The Senchus fer n-Alban also contains the myth of Fergus. This is an older document, perhaps dating to the seventh century, that has been heavily interpolated with later material, probably including the mythological parts. Appended to the Míniugud Senchasa Fher nAlba in many manuscripts is the Genelaig Albanensium, a list of genealogies relating to Gaelic rulers of Scotland going up to at least Constantine III (995–7) (it goes later in some of the manuscripts). It is likely that this material was inserted into the Míniugud in the early eleventh century.

In the Duan Albanach, this tradition is re-enforced. It is known to have been written in the reign of King Malcolm III (Máel Coluim mac Donnchada) (one line reads "Maelcoluim is now the king"). It recounts the earliest histories of the Picts, and then celebrates the conquest of the Picts by the Gaedhil. It calls the Scottish Gaels the children of Conaire and the traces the descent of the Scottish kings from Fergus mac Eirc. It does not trace their descent any further, because in the manuscript the Duan Albanach follows from a companion piece, the Duan Eireannach (i.e. Irish Poem), which had already recounted the history of the Gaels from Scythia via Egypt to Ireland.

These mythical traditions are incorporated into the Declaration of Arbroath, and in that document origins from Ireland are omitted for the first time. They were believed in the early modern period and beyond, and even King James VI traced his origin to Fergus, saying, in his own words, that he was a "Monarch sprunge of Ferguse race".

=== Goth versus Gael ===
The Goth versus Gael model was developed in the context of a vast cultural and linguistic chasm which existed in Scotland in the early modern era, and was invented in the context of the Anglo-Scottish Union and the Jacobite risings in the eighteenth century. The model originates ultimately in the later Middle Ages, when the Germanic-speaking subjects of the Scottish king began to think of themselves as Scots, and began the ethnic and cultural disassociation of Scottish and Gaelic, previously two identical concepts, by calling their own brand of English Scottis and renaming Scottis as Erse. Also important was the impact of the Reformation and the Union. Scots imported English prejudices about the Irish Gaels, and in turn adapted them for the Scottish Gaels.

The Goth versus Gael debate centred on which part of Scotland's past is the more important, the Germanic or the Celtic. Germanicists, or Gothicists as they are sometimes called, attempted to disassociate Gaels and Gaelic from the Scottish past. One extreme example was John Pinkerton, who believed passionately that the people and language of lowland Scotland derived from a Gothic dialect spoken by the Picts. John Pinkerton even invented ancient tales to give substance to this fictional ancient people. The main thrust of the Germanicist model was destroyed in the nineteenth century when William Forbes Skene and others brought medieval Scotland into the frame of serious, recognisably modern scholarship. Nevertheless, this model has had a lot of impact on popular understandings of medieval Scottish history. It explains, for instance, why some popular historians believe that English became the language of Lowland Scotland in the reign of Malcolm III, owing to the influence of his wife, the Anglo-Hungarian Saint Margaret, when in fact no such thing happened for another few centuries.

== Origins ==
=== Gaelic and Pictish kings ===
That Pictland had Gaelic kings is not in question. One of the earliest, if not the earliest, was Nechtan mac Derile, the son of a Gaelic lord named Dargart and the Pictish princess Derile. Pictish kings, moreover, were probably Gaelic-speaking poets. There exists a Gaelic elegy to the Pictish king, Bridei, Bili's son. The poem is attributed to his contemporary, Adomnán of Iona, but this is tenuous. It is however probably contemporary, dating to the late 7th or early eighth century. Another poem, attributed to Riagail of Bangor, celebrates the same ruler's victory over the Northumbrians, at the Battle of Dun Nechtain on 20 May 685.

In the early eighth century, the great King of the Picts was Óengus mac Fergusa, conqueror of Dalriada. It is possible, as has been pointed out by some linguists and historians, that Óengus and Fergus are just Gaelic versions of native Pictish names, namely, Onuist and Urguist, the names recorded in one strand of the Pictish king lists. However, these names are rare in the larger P-Celtic world, and largely out of place in the context of previous Pictish kings. Furthermore, an inscription relating to Causantín son of Fergus reads:

CV[…]NTIN/FILIUSFIRCU/S.
(Constantine son of Fergus).

This inscription is from the Dupplin Cross, and was found in the heart of southern Pictland, near Forteviot. It dates from the late 8th or early ninth century. If the name in question really were the Pictish Urguist, then it is odd that a contemporary Pictish description gave the Gaelic form, form beginning with the unmistakably Goidelic F. It is thus likely that several of the later Pictish Kings spoke Gaelic as their first language.

=== Fortriu to Moray ===
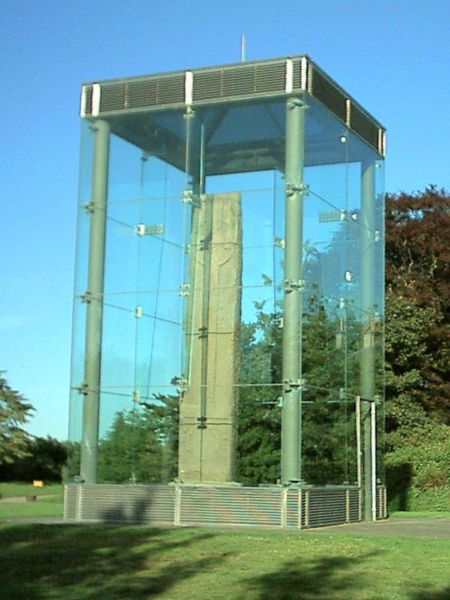
Sueno's Stone, located in Forres, in the old kingdom of Fortriu. This gigantic, probably post-Pictish monument, marks some kind of military triumph.

The St Andrews historian Alex Woolf has recently put forward a case for relocating the Kingdom of Fortriu north of the Mounth (the Grampians). Previously, it had been located in the vicinity of Strathearn; but as Woolf pointed out, this is based on one passage saying that the Men of Fortriu fought a battle in Strathearn. This is an unconvincing reason, because there are two Strathearns - one in the south, and one in the north - and, moreover, every battle has to be fought outside the territory of one of the combatants. By contrast, a northern recension of the Anglo-Saxon Chronicle makes it clear that Fortriu was north of the Mounth, in the area visited by Columba. The case has to be accepted, and there can be little doubt that the core of Fortriu lay to the north of the Grampian Mountains - in Moray, Ross and perhaps Mar and Buchan too.

Relocating Fortriu north of the Mounth increases the importance of the Vikings. After all, the Viking impact on the north was greater than in the south, and in the north, the Vikings actually conquered and made permanent territorial gains.

=== Pictland to Alba ===
There remains the possibility that Alba is simply a Gaelic translation of the Pictish name for Pictland. Both the Welsh and the Irish use archaic words for Briton to describe the Picts. It is very likely therefore that the Picts did so themselves; or if they did not originally, they came to do so. In which case the Pictish for Pictland would have been either the same as their word for Britain, or an obsolete term. Alba was exactly this kind of word in Old Irish. It is therefore plausible that Alba is simply a Gaelic translation. The name change is first registered at the very beginning of the tenth century, not long before Constantine II is alleged to have Scotticised the "Pictish" Church, and at the height of Viking raids. Later records, especially the Chronicle of the Kings of Alba and other documents in the Poppleton Manuscript, tell us that the Picts were simply conquered and annihilated by king Kenneth MacAlpin (Cináed mac Ailpín). This is the traditional explanation, and the one repeated by many historians. The only thing which is certain is that before 900, the Cruithentuath (Gaelic for Pictland), and perhaps Fortriu, became Gaelic-speaking Alba.

== See also ==
- Fortriu
- Gille Coluim the Marischal
- MacAlpin's Treason
- Mormaer of Moray
- Scotland in the High Middle Ages

== Bibliography ==
=== Primary sources ===
- Anderson, Alan Orr, Early Sources of Scottish History: AD 500-1286, 2 Vols, (Edinburgh, 1922)
- Skene, William F. (ed.), Chronicles of the Picts and Scots: And Other Memorials of Scottish History, (Edinburgh, 1867)

=== Secondary sources ===
- Anderson, Marjorie O., Kings and Kingship in Early Scotland, (Edinburgh, 1973)
- Bannerman, John, Studies in the History of Dalriada, (Edinburgh, 1974)
- Broun, Dauvit "Defining Scotland and the Scots Before the Wars of Independence," in Image and Identity: the Making and Remaking of Scotland through the Ages, in. D. Broun, R. Finlay & M. Lynch (eds.), (Edinburgh 1998), pp. 4–17
- Broun, Dauvit, "Dunkeld and the origin of Scottish identity", in Innes Review 48 (1997), pp. 112–24, reprinted in Spes Scotorum: Hope of Scots, eds. Broun and Clancy (1999), pp. 95–111
- Broun, Dauvit & Clancy, Thomas Owen (eds.),Spes Scottorum: Hope of the Scots, (Edinburgh, 1999)
- Clancy, Thomas Owen, "Philosopher-King: Nechtan mac Der-Ilei", in the Scottish Historical Review, 83, 2004, pp. 125–49.
- Clancy, Thomas Owen, "The real St Ninian", in The Innes Review, 52 (2001).
- Clancy, Thomas Owen, "Scotland, the 'Nennian' recension of the Historia Brittonum, and the Lebor Bretnach", in Simon Taylor (ed.) Kings, Clerics and Chronicles in Scotland, 500-1297, (Dublin/Portland, 2000), pp. 87–107.
- Clancy, Thomas Owen (ed.), The Triumph Tree: Scotland's Earliest Poetry, 550-1350, (Edinburgh, 1998)
- Driscoll, Steven, Alba: The Gaelic Kingdom of Scotland AD 800-1124, (Edinburgh, 1996)
- Dumville, David N., "Ireland and North Britain in the Earlier Middle Ages: Contexts for the Míniugud Senchasa Fher nAlban", in Colm Ó Baoill & Nancy R. McGuire (eds.) Rannsachadh Na Gáidhlig, (Aberdeen, 2002)
- Dumville, David N., "St Cathróe of Metz and the Hagiography of Exoticism," in Irish Hagiography: Saints and Scholars, ed. John Carey et al. (Dublin, 2001), pp. 172–6
- Ferguson, William, The Identity of the Scottish Nation: An Historic Enquiry, (Edinburgh, 1998)
- Foster, Sally, Picts, Gaels and Scots: Early Historic Scotland, (London, 1996)
- Forsyth, Katherine, Language in Pictland, (Utrecht 1997)
- Jackson, Kenneth H. (ed), The Gaelic Notes in the Book of Deer (The Osborn Bergin Memorial Lecture 1970), (Cambridge (1972)
- Jackson, Kenneth H. "The Pictish language", in F.T. Wainwright (ed.), The Problem of the Picts, (Edinburgh, 1955), pp. 129–66
- Hudson, Benjamin T., Kings of Celtic Scotland, (Westport, 1994)
- Pittock, Murray G.H., Celtic Identity and the British Image, (Manchester, 1999)
- Watson, W.J., The Celtic Place-Names of Scotland, (Edinburgh, 1926) reprinted, with an Introduction, full Watson bibliography and corrigenda by Simon Taylor (Edinburgh, 2004)
- Woolf, Alex, "Dun Nechtain, Fortriu and the Geography of the Picts", (forthcoming)
