= Finguine Fota =

Finguine Fota (died 689) or Finguine son of Eochaid was king of Cowal in modern-day Scotland, and a member of the Gaelic Cenél Comgaill kindred.

== Life ==
Finguine was the great-grandson of Conall mac Comgaill, and the father of Dargart mac Finguine, who was in turn the father of Bridei son of Der-Ilei and Naiton son of Der-Ilei, both 8th-century kings of Fortriu and of the Picts.

Finguine may after 671 have formed a three-way alliance with Bridei son of Beli, king of Pictish Fortriu, and Bridei's nephew Eugein, who was king of the British kingdom of Alt Clut. This coalition may have been behind the siege of Dunadd in 682, that saw Finguine eclipse Máel Dúin mac Conaill of Cenél nGabráin.

Finguine's death is reported in the Annals of Ulster. He was the last significant dynastic figure of Cenél Comgaill, though it remained prominent in Argyll politics over the following generation, probably because of the influence of Finguine's grandchildren as kings of Fortriu.

== Bibliography ==
- Clancy, Thomas Owen (2004). "Philosopher-king: Nechtan mac Der Ilei". Scottish Historical Review. 83 (2): 125–149. doi:10.3366/shr.2004.83.2.125.
- Fraser, James E. (2009). From Caledonia to Pictland: Scotland to 795. Edinburgh: Edinburgh University Press. ISBN 9780748612321.
