= Taran mac Ainftech =

King of the Picts from 693 to 697

Taran Mac Ainften

King of the Picts
- Reign: 693–697
- Predecessor: Bridei III
- Successor: Bridei IV
- Father: Entifidich

Taran Mac Ainften was a King of the Picts from 693 until 697, according to the Pictish king-lists. His name is the same as that of the Celtic thunder-god, Taranis.

His father is just a name, which occurs in various forms, e.g., Entifidich in the Poppleton Manuscript, Enfidaig, Amfredech, Anfudeg, and as Amfodech in the French king-list embedded in the Scalacronica. The list in National Library of Scotland MS, Advocates' 34.7.3, seems to say that Taran was the brother of King Nechtan mac Der-Ilei, which could mean that Taran's mother was the Pictish princess Der-Ilei. However, the latter list is problematic and places the reign of King Bridei IV, Nechtan's brother, after Nechtan; on the other hand, the list is one of those that is aware that Bridei was the son of Dargart mac Finguine, indicating access to material not available to some of the other lists.

Some of the king lists say he reigned for fourteen years; however, the Poppleton manuscript and Lebor Bretnach lists, along with the Scalacronica list, give four years only, so the x may be a mistake. He was almost certainly succeeded by Bruide, the son of Dargart and Der-Ilei, although in what circumstances, it is hard to say.

Entries from the Irish annals, which Alan Orr Anderson suggested may be related to this Taran, are a report in the Annals of Ulster reporting "the killing of Ainfthech and Nia Néill and the sons of Boendo", where Ainfthech may be Taran's father, and then Taran's deposition in 696, and finally the report in the Annals of Ulster that "Tarachin went to Ireland" in 698.

Regnal titles
Preceded by Bridei III	King of the Picts; 693–697	Succeeded by Bridei IV
