= Óengus I =

King of the Picts from 732 to 761

Óengus mac Fergusa
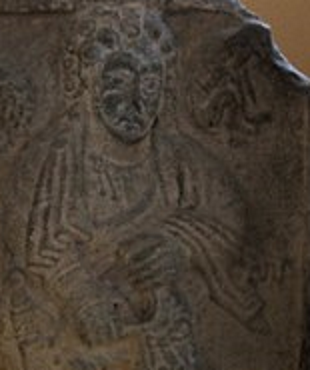
- The figure of the Old Testament King David shown killing a lion on the St Andrews Sarcophagus is thought to represent King Óengus. The figure is dressed as a Roman emperor of Late Antiquity and wears a fibula like that of the Emperor Justinian on the mosaic at San Vitale, Ravenna.

King of the Picts
- Reign: 732–761
- Predecessor: Nechtan III
- Successor: Talorgan II
- Died: 761
- Issue: Bridei; Talorgan
- House: Óengus

Óengus son of Fergus (Pictish: *Onuist map Vurguist; (Note: Katherine Forsyth discusses the various forms of Óengus's name, also providing Ungus(t) as an alternative Pictish form.) Old Irish: Óengus mac Fergusso, lit. 'Angus son of Fergus'; died 761) was king of the Picts from 732 until his death in 761. His reign can be reconstructed in some detail from a variety of sources. The unprecedented territorial gains he made from coast to coast, and the legacy he left, mean Óengus can be considered the first king of what would become Scotland.

Wresting power from his rivals, Óengus became the chief king in Pictland following a period of civil war in the late 720s.

The most powerful ruler in Scotland for more than two decades, kings from Óengus's family dominated Pictland for a century, until defeat at the hands of Vikings in 839 began a new period of instability, ending with the coming to power of another Pictish dynasty, that of Cináed mac Ailpín.

== Sources and background ==
Surviving Pictish sources for the period are few, limited to king lists, the original of which was prepared in the early 720s, and a number of accounts relating to the foundation of St Andrews, then called Cennrígmonaid. Beyond Pictland, the principal sources are the Irish annals, of which the Annals of Ulster and the Annals of Tigernach are the most reliable. These include materials from an annal kept at the monastery of Iona in Scotland. Óengus and the Picts appear occasionally in Welsh sources, such as the Annales Cambriae, and more frequently in Northumbrian sources, of which the Continuation of Bede's chronicle and the Historia Regum attributed to Symeon of Durham are the most important.

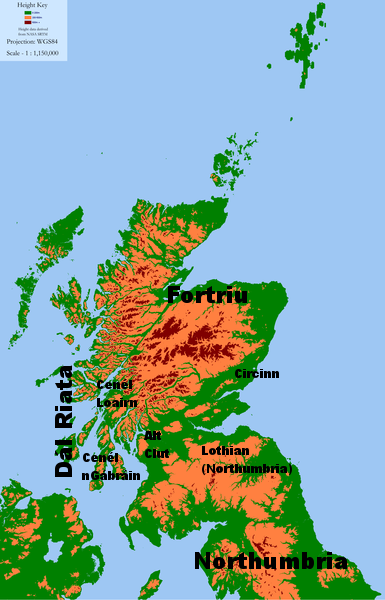
Selected political groups in map of Northern Britain (Scotland) around 740 AD

The Picts were one of four political groups in north Britain in the early 8th century. Pictland ran from the River Forth northwards, including Orkney, Shetland and the Western Isles. Prior to the Viking Age, the main power in Pictland appears to have been the kingdom of Fortriu. Known high-status sites in Fortriu include Burghead and Craig Phádraig by Inverness. Pictland appears to have had only one bishop with his seat at Rosemarkie. (Note: Early 8th century bishops include Curetán, Fergus and Brecc. Surveys of North Britain can be found in D. W. Harding, The Iron Age in Northern Britain: Celts and Romans, Natives and Invaders (2004), and Leslie Alcock, Kings and Warriors, Craftsmen and Priests in Northern Britain AD 550–850 (2003))

From the Forth south to the River Humber lay the kingdom of Northumbria. Once the dominant force in Britain, it remained a powerful kingdom, but the end of the old dynasty of kings with the death of Osric in 729 led to conflict between rival families for the throne. The growing power of the Mercian kingdom to the south added to the problems faced by Northumbrian kings. For most of Óengus's reign Northumbria was ruled by King Eadberht Eating. (Note: Surveys of Northumbria include those by David Rollason and Nick Higham.)

To the south-west of Pictland were the Gaels of Dál Riata where the kingship was disputed between the Cenél Loairn of northern Argyll and the Cenél nGabráin of Kintyre. In 723 Selbach mac Ferchair abdicated as head of the Cenél Loairn and king of Dál Riata in favour of his son Dúngal, who was driven out as king of Dál Riata by Eochaid mac Echdach of the Cenél nGabráin in 726. Dúngal and Eochaid were still in conflict as late as 731, when Dúngal burnt Tarbert.

The history of the fourth group, the Britons of Altclut, later the kingdom of Strathclyde, leaves little trace in the record. King Teudebur map Beli had ruled from Dumbarton Rock since 722, and continued to do so until his death in 752 when his son Dumnagual succeeded him. (Note: "Rotri, king of the Britons", whose death is recorded in the Annales Cambriae s.a. 754.1, has sometimes been identified as a king of Alt Clut, but this notice refers to Rhodri Molwynog ap Idwal, King of Gwynedd.)

== Rise to power ==
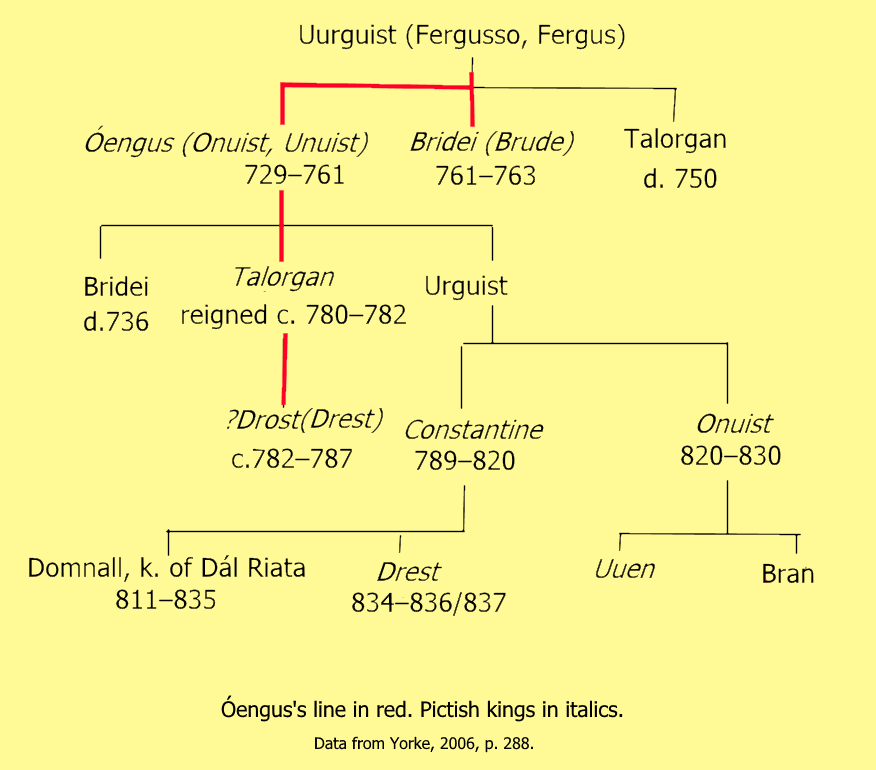
Family relations of Óengus I

An early medieval Irish genealogy tract claims Óengus is a descendant of the Eoganachta of Mag Gergind and that they, in turn, are descendants of, or kin with, the Eóganachta of Munster, and that both are descended from Cairpre Cruithnecháin or "Cairbre the little Pict", but the genealogical link here was likely invented as propaganda supporting an alliance around 735 between Óengus and Cathal, the king of Munster and paramount king of Ireland at the time. The Éoganachta of Mag Gergind are generally accepted as having been located in modern Angus and the Mearns. (Note: The genealogy appears in the Rawlinson B 502 manuscript, ¶1083.) Óengus — also called Unust, Unuist or Onuist in Pictish and Old Gaelic, was the son of Vurguist in Pictish or, in modern English, Fergus.

Óengus thus appears to have been a native of the Mearns, Pictish Circin, possibly born into an established Verturian kindred there. It is relatively nearby, at the hill of Moncrieffe, near Perth, that he first appears in the records, defeating his rival, Alpin (or Pictish Elphin), in battle. That the Irish annals envision his kin as "Eóganachta" suggests he was the descendant of an obscure "Vuen" (or Wen), the Pictish British cognate of Gaelic Éogan.

Much of Óengus' early life is unknown; he was middle-aged by the time he entered into history. His close kin included at least two sons, Bridei (died 736) and Talorgan (died 782), and two brothers, Talorgan (died 750) and Bridei (died 763). (Note: Barbara Yorke has analysed the reconstructed relationship between late Pictish kings. Talorgan is a hypocoristic form of Talorg.)

King Nechtan son of Der-Ilei abdicated to enter a monastery in 724 and was imprisoned by his successor Drest in 726. In 728 and 729, four kings competed for power in Pictland: Drest; Nechtan; Alpín, of whom little is known; and Óengus, who was a partisan of Nechtan, and perhaps his acknowledged heir.

Four battles large enough to be recorded in Ireland were fought in 728 and 729. Alpín was defeated twice by Óengus, after which Nechtan was restored to power. In 729 a battle between supporters of Óengus and Nechtan's enemies was fought at Monith Carno (traditionally Cairn o' Mount, near Fettercairn) where the supporters of Óengus were victorious. Nechtan was restored to the kingship, probably until his death in 732. On 12 August 729 Óengus defeated and killed Drest in battle at Druimm Derg Blathuug, a place which has not been identified.

== Piercing of Dál Riata ==
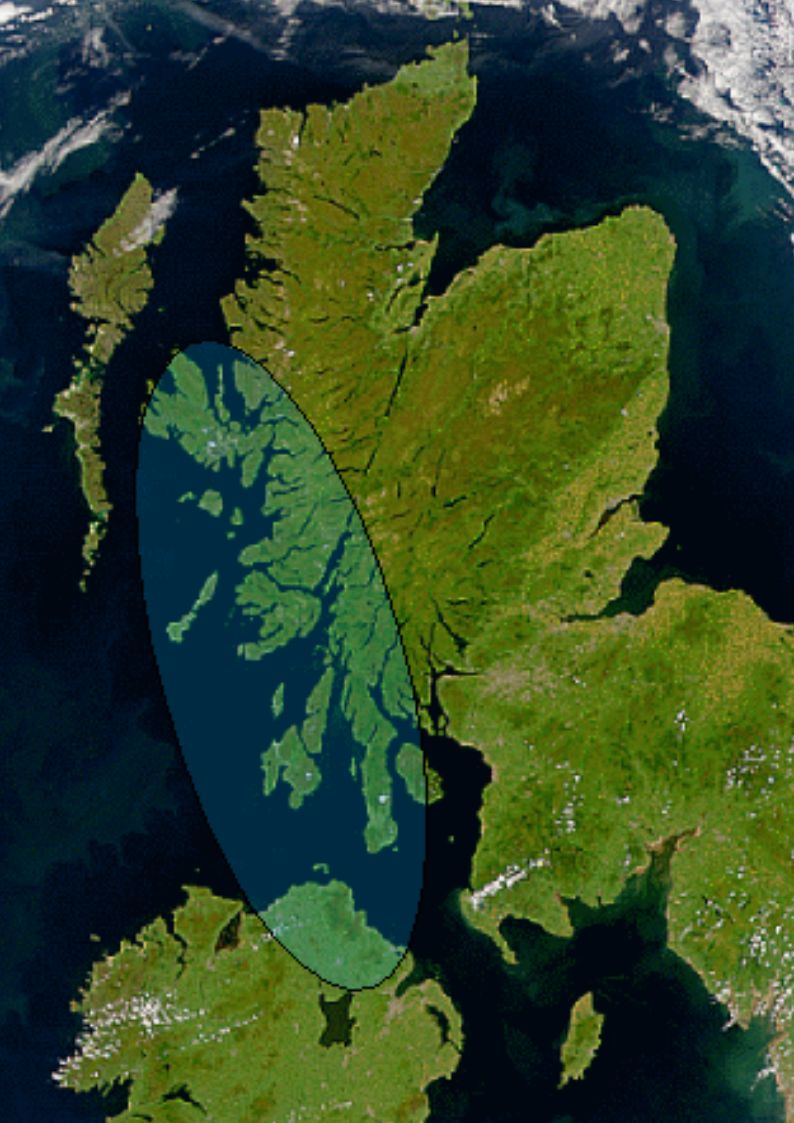
Satellite image of northern Britain and Ireland showing the approximate area of Dál Riata (shaded)

In the 730s, Óengus fought against Dál Riata whose traditional overlords and protectors in Ireland, the Cenél Conaill, were much weakened at this time. A fleet from Dál Riata fought for Flaithbertach mac Loingsig, chief of the Cenél Conaill, in his war with Áed Allán of the Cenél nEógan, and suffered heavy losses in 733. Dál Riata was ruled by Eochaid mac Echdach, possibly of the Cenél nGabráin who died in 733, and the king lists are unclear as to who, if anyone, succeeded him as overking. The Cenél Loairn of north Argyll was ruled by Dúngal mac Selbaig whom Eochaid had deposed as overking of Dál Riata in 726.

Fighting between the Picts, led by Óengus's son Bridei, and the Dál Riata, led by Talorgan mac Congussa, is recorded in 731. In 733, Dúngal mac Selbaig "profaned [the sanctuary] of Tory Island when he dragged Bridei out of it". Dúngal, previously deposed as overking of Dál Riata, was overthrown as king of the Cenél Loairn and replaced by his first cousin Muiredach mac Ainbcellaig.

In 734 Talorgan mac Congussa was handed over to the Picts by his brother and drowned by them. Talorcan son of Drestan was captured near Dún Ollaigh. He appears to have been the King of Atholl and was drowned on Óengus's order in 739. (Note: Talorgan was related to Nechtan, and is called his brother in 713, which may mean half-brother, foster-brother, or brother-in-law.) Dúngal too was a target in this year. He was wounded, the unidentified fortress of Dún Leithfinn was destroyed, and he "fled into Ireland, to be out of the power of Óengus".

The annals report a second campaign by Óengus against the Dál Riata in 736. Dúngal, who had returned from Ireland, and his brother Feradach, were captured and bound in chains. The fortresses of Creic and Dunadd were taken and burnt. Muiredach of the Cenél Loairn was no more successful, defeated with heavy loss by Óengus's brother Talorgan mac Fergusa, perhaps by Loch Awe. A final campaign — known as the "smiting" — in 741 saw the Dál Riata again defeated. With this Dál Riata disappears from the record for a generation.

It may be that Óengus was involved in wars in Ireland, perhaps fighting with Áed Allán, or against him as an ally of Cathal mac Finguine. The full extent of his involvement, though, is unknown. There is the presence of Óengus's son Bridei at Tory Island, on the north-west coast of Donegal in 733, close to the lands of Áed Allán's enemy Flaithbertach mac Loingsig. Less certainly, the Fragmentary Annals of Ireland report the presence of a Pictish fleet from Fortriu fighting for Flaithbertach in 733 rather than against him. (Note: Most Irish annals say that Flaithbertach was supported by a fleet from Dál Riata.)

== Alt Clut, Northumbria and Mercia ==
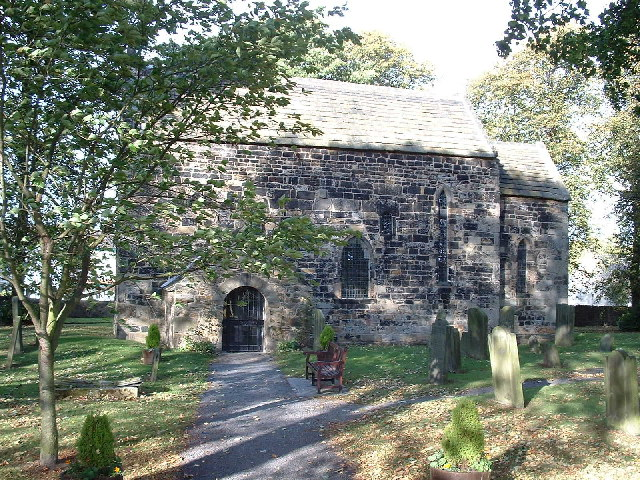
Escomb Church, County Durham. The stone churches built for Nechtan, and perhaps Óengus's church at St Andrews, are presumed to have been similar.

In 740, a war between the Picts and the Northumbrians is reported, during which Æthelbald, King of Mercia, took advantage of the absence of Eadberht of Northumbria to ravage his lands, and perhaps burn York. The reason for the war is unclear, but it has been suggested that it was related to the killing of Earnwine son of Eadwulf on Eadberht's orders. Earnwine's father had probably been an exile in the north after his defeat in the civil war of 705–706, and it may be that Óengus, or Æthelbald, or both, had tried to place him on the Northumbrian throne.

Battles between the Picts and the Britons of Alt Clut, or Strathclyde, are recorded in 744 and again in 750, when Kyle was taken from Alt Clut by Eadberht of Northumbria. The battle of Catohic between the Britons and the Picts is reported at a place named Mocetauc (perhaps Mugdock near Milngavie) in which Talorgan mac Fergusa, Óengus's brother, was killed. Following the defeat in 750, the Annals of Ulster record "the ebbing of the sovereignty of Óengus". This is thought to refer to the coming to power of Áed Find, son of Eochaid mac Echdach, in all or part of Dál Riata, and his rejection of Óengus's overlordship.

A number of interpretations have been offered of the relations between Óengus, Eadberht and Æthelbald in the period from 740 to 750, which due to the paucity of sources remain otherwise unclear. One suggestion is that Óengus and Æthelbald were allied against Eadberht, or even that they exercised a joint rulership of Britain, or bretwaldaship, Óengus collecting tribute north of the River Humber and Æthelbald south of the Humber. This rests largely on a confused passage in Symeon of Durham's Historia Regum Anglorum, and it has more recently been suggested that the interpretation offered by Frank Stenton — that it is based on a textual error and that Óengus and Æthelbald were not associated in any sort of joint overlordship — is the correct one.

In 756, Óengus is found campaigning alongside Eadberht of Northumbria. The campaign is reported as follows:

In the year of the Lord's incarnation 756, King Eadberht in the eighteenth year of his reign, and Unust, king of Picts led armies to the town of Dumbarton. And hence the Britons accepted terms there, on the first day of the month of August. But on the tenth day of the same month perished almost the whole army which he led from Ouania to Niwanbirig.

That Ouania is Govan is now reasonably certain, but the location of Newanbirig is less so. Newburgh-on-Tyne near Hexham has been suggested. An alternative interpretation of the events of 756 has been advanced: it identifies Newanbirig with Newborough by Lichfield in the kingdom of Mercia. A defeat here for Eadberht and Óengus by Æthelbald's Mercians would correspond with the claim in the Saint Andrews foundation legends that a king named Óengus son of Fergus founded the church there as a thanksgiving to Saint Andrew for saving him after a defeat in Mercia. Marjorie Anderson supports this version of the St Andrews foundation legend.

== Cult of Saint Andrew ==
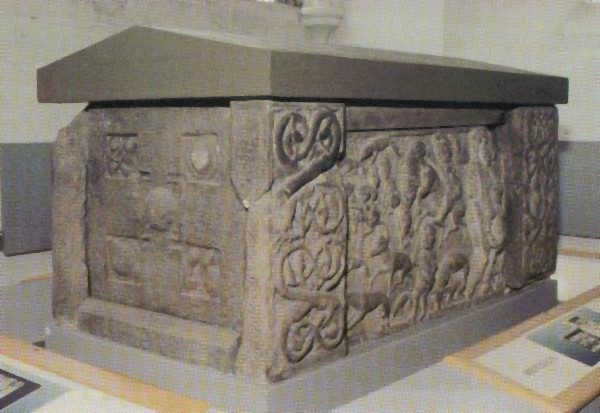
St Andrews Sarcophagus

The story of the foundation of St Andrews, originally Cennrígmonaid, is not contemporary and may contain legend. The Irish annals report the death of "Tuathalán, abbot of Cinrigh Móna", in 747, making it certain that St Andrews had been founded before that date, probably by Óengus or by Nechtan son of Der-Ilei. (Note: The most recent study, by Barbara Yorke, favours "Óengus".) It is generally presumed that the St Andrews Sarcophagus was executed at the command of Óengus. Later generations may have conflated this king Óengus with the 9th century king of the same name. The choice of David as a model is, Alex Woolf suggests, an appropriate one, as David too was an usurper.

The cult of Saint Andrew may have come to Pictland from Northumbria, as had the cult of Saint Peter which had been favoured by Nechtan, and in particular from the monastery at Hexham which was dedicated to Saint Andrew. This apparent connection with the Northumbrian church may have left a written record. Óengus, like his successors and possible kinsmen Caustantín and Eógan, is recorded prominently in the Liber Vitae Ecclesiae Dunelmensis, a list of some 3000 benefactors for whom prayers were said in religious institutions connected with Durham. However, argues Simon Taylor, there is "no absolute proof" that the cult existed before the 11th century.

== Death and legacy ==
Óengus died in 761, "aged probably more than seventy, ... the dominating figure in the politics of Northern Britain". His death is reported in the usual brief style by the annalists, except for the continuator of Bede in Northumbria, possibly relying upon a Dál Riata source, who wrote, "Óengus, king of the Picts, died. From the beginning of his reign right to the end he perpetrated bloody crimes, like a tyrannical slaughtered". The Pictish Chronicle king lists have it that he was succeeded by his brother Bridei. His son Talorgan was also later king, reigning from around 780 until his death in 782. Talorgan is the first son of a Pictish king known to have become king, if not immediately upon his father's death.

The following 9th century Irish praise poem from the Book of Leinster is associated with Óengus:

Good the day when Óengus took Alba,
hilly Alba with its strong chiefs;
he brought battle to palisaded towns,
with feet, with hands, with broad shields.

An assessment of Óengus is problematic, not least because annalistic sources provide very little information on Scotland in the succeeding generations. His apparent Irish links add to the long list of arguments which challenge the idea that the "Gaelicisation" of eastern Scotland began in the time of Cináed mac Ailpín; indeed there are good reasons for believing that process began before Óengus's reign. (Note: Nechtan son of Der-Ilei and his brother Bridei are thought to have had a Gaelic father, Dargart mac Finguine of the Cenél Comgaill.) Many of the Pictish kings until the death of Eógan mac Óengusa in 839 belong to the family of Óengus, in particular the 9th-century sons of Fergus, Caustantín and Óengus. (Note: Bannerman argues otherwise, however; Yorke has compared the various approaches.)

Historians have noted Óengus's decisive military victories — particularly as these ranged over a broad geographical area, his cultural patronage and religious foundation at St Andrews. The historian Keith Coleman describes Óengus as an "exceptionally powerful" Pictish king, while Murray Pittock has argued that not only was he more successful than any of his predecessors in uniting "all Scotia, Scotland north of the Forth, to his authority", but in doing so he "foreshadow[ed] a future united Scottish kingdom". Kings from his broader family continued to rule the Picts until they suffered a crushing defeat at the hands of Vikings in 839 when Óengus's great-grandson — and men "almost without number" — was killed. This was followed by a period with numerous kings reigning briefly and in quick succession, most dying at the hands of rivals, until the accession of Kenneth I or Cináed mac Alpin (Kenneth MacAlpin) in 842. While Óengus may have foreshadowed rulership over a united Scotland, Pittock argues that it is in Kenneth I that "by tradition" the first King of Scotland is found.

== Notes ==
Óengus I House of Óengus Born: 7th century Died: 761
Regnal titles
| Preceded by Nechtan III | King of the Picts; 732–761 | Succeeded by Talorgan II |
