= Talorcan son of Drestan =

King of Atholl

Talorcan son of Drestan (Old Irish: Talorc mac Drostain; died 739) was king of Atholl in modern-day Scotland.

== Background ==
The Annals of Ulster record for the year 713 that Talorcan was "bound" by his brother, the Pictish king Naiton son of Der-Ilei. As Naiton's father was Dargart mac Finguine, this implies that Talorcan was the son of Naiton's mother Der-Ilei, who was probably a daughter or sister of the earlier Pictish king Bridei son of Beli. Talorcan's father Drestan was probably also a king of Atholl, or at least a member of its royal line. Talorcan may have been making a bid for the Pictish kingship in 713, as indicated by a further entry for the year in the Annals of Ulster recording the death of another of Naiton's brothers Ciniod son of Der-Ilei.

Talorcan was "completely bound" in 734 near Dunollie, the stronghold of Cenél Loairn, then under the control of Muiredach mac Ainbcellaig; before being drowned in 739 by the Pictish king Onuist son of Uurguist. Both the Annals of Ulster and the Annals of Tigernach explicitly describe Talorcan as rex Athfoitle or King of Atholl at his death.

== Bibliography ==
- Clancy, Thomas Owen (2004). "Philosopher-king: Nechtan mac Der Ilei". Scottish Historical Review. 83 (2): 125–149. doi:10.3366/shr.2004.83.2.125.
- Fraser, James (2009). From Caledonia to Pictland: Scotland to 795. Edinburgh: Edinburgh University Press. ISBN 9780748612321.
