= Bridei son of Beli =

King of the Picts from 671 to 692

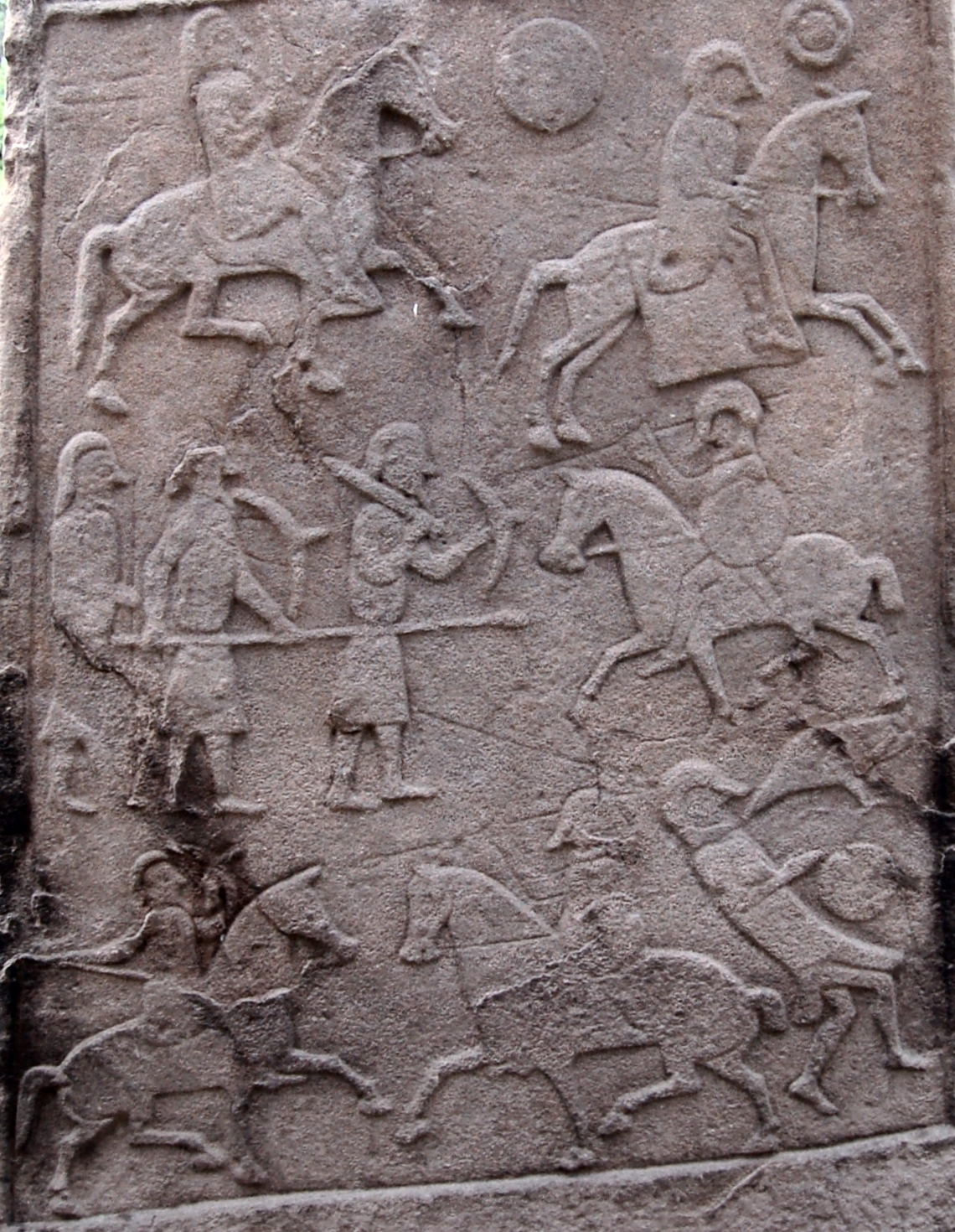
- The battle scene from the Aberlemno 2 Pictish stone, which may show the Battle of Dun Nechtain; Picts on the left, Northumbrians on the right, the mounted Pictish figure perhaps representing King Bridei.

King of the Picts and of Fortriu
- Reign: 671–692
- Predecessor: Drest son of Donuel
- Successor: Taran mac Ainftech
- Born: by 628
- Died: 692
- Burial: Iona Abbey
- Father: Beli I of Alt Clut
- Mother: Unknown daughter of Edwin of Northumbria

Bridei son of Beli, died 692 (Note: Bridei's name is found as "Bridei", "Bredei", "Brude", "Bruide" and "Bruidhe"; his father's as "Beli", "Bili" and "Bile". "Son of" is sometimes represented by the Old Irish "mac", the Old Welsh "map", the Latin "filius" or the abbreviations "m." or "f." Although regnal numbers do not appear in any contemporary source, some 19th and 20th century sources refer to Bridei son of Beli as "Bridei III".) was king of Fortriu and of the Picts from 671 until 692. His reign marks the start of the period known to historians as the Verturian hegemony, a turning point in the history of Scotland, when the uniting of Pictish provinces under the over-kingship of the kings of Fortriu saw the development of a strong Pictish state and identity encompassing most of the peoples north of the Forth.

Bridei was probably brought up at the court of the Anglian kingdom of Northumbria, whose expansion had established it as the dominant power in northern Britain over the mid-7th century. His father was Beli, king of the British kingdom of Altclut, and his mother probably a daughter of Edwin of Northumbria, though his grandfather may have been the earlier Pictish king Nechtan nepos Uerb.

Bridei's rise to power in Fortriu probably took place under the patronage of his kinsman King Ecgfrith of Northumbria, after Bridei's predecessor Drest son of Donuel was expelled from the kingship after leading a rebellion against Northumbrian domination in 671. Bridei established an expansionary policy however, and in a series of campaigns between 679 and 683 built a confederation of Pictish territories owing allegiance to him through alliance and conquest. This brought him into conflict with Ecgfrith, who led an army north into Pictish territory in 685, culminating in the Battle of Dun Nechtain, when Ecgfrith was killed and the Northumbrian army destroyed by Bridei's forces.

Bridei's victory at Dun Nechtain marked the end of Northumbrian overlordship over the Picts, the Gaels and many of the Britons; and saw him consolidate his extensive territorial control. The following period saw the conscious development of the idea of the Picts as a single people under a single ruler; this process continued under the later kingships of Bridei son of Der-Ilei and Naiton son of Der-Ilei, who were probably his grandchildren.

== Background ==
=== Political background ===
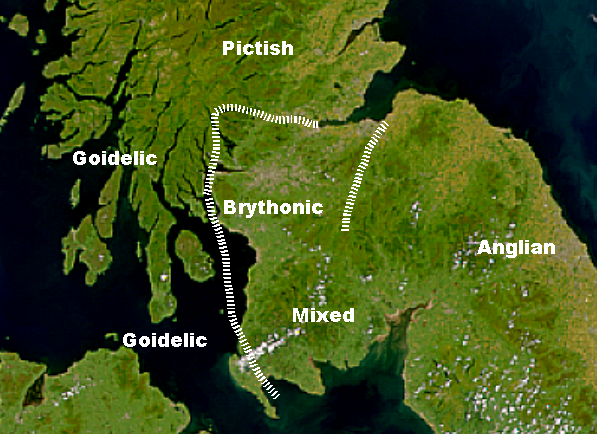
Approximate language zones in southern Scotland, 7th–8th centuries

Before the Viking incursions that started in the late 8th century, the area of modern Scotland was divided between four main cultural and linguistic groupings: the Gaels of Dál Riata, the Britons, the Angles and the Picts, though identities and political groupings were in a constant state of flux and could often change among and between them. The Gaels occupied the west of modern Scotland north of the Firth of Clyde and were part of a Gaelic linguistic and cultural zone that included Ireland, from which it was separated only by the short sea crossing of the North Channel.

To the south a number of British kingdoms had developed in the aftermath of the withdrawal of the Roman Empire, including Altclut in the basin of the River Clyde, Rheged to the south around the Solway Firth, and the Gododdin to the east around Edinburgh. In the south east Bernicia had been established as a Germanic-speaking Anglian kingdom based around Bamburgh in modern North East England in the mid 6th century, and by 638 had captured Edinburgh and gained much of the territory of the Goddodin around Lothian. The Picts largely occupied the lands in the east of modern Scotland north of the Forth and were originally a diverse group of peoples defined at least in part by never having been Romano-British.

The territory of the Picts was divided into two parts by the Mounth – the chain of high mountains that runs almost to the North Sea near Dunottar – and the northern and southern parts of the Pictish territory were further divided into smaller territories referred to by the Northumbrian writer Bede as prouinciae, at least some of which are recorded as kingdoms. Most significant of these was Fortriu, which was located north of the Mounth around the Moray Firth, encompassing the areas around Forres and Inverness, and whose primary centre of royal power probably lay at Burghead, which was three times larger than any other enclosed site in Early Medieval Scotland.

Between 653 and 685 the Picts were under Anglian overlordship through a series of puppet kings, as the expansionary kingdom of Northumbria came to dominate much of northern Britain. The southern Pictish lands south of the Mounth may have formed an Anglo-Pictish province controlled from Fife, whose ruling family may have included the Northumbrian noble Beornhæth. A document written in Rome between 678 and 681 records the claim of the Northumbrian bishop Wilfrid to primacy over "all the northern part of Britain and of Ireland and the Isles which are inhabited by the races of Angles, Britons, Gaels and Picts". In 681 the Northumbrian bishop Trumwine was appointed "Bishop of the Picts", though the location of his see at Abercorn, in Northumbrian territory south of the Forth, suggests that Northumbrian control of Pictish territory north of the Forth might still have been seen as insecure.

=== Family background ===
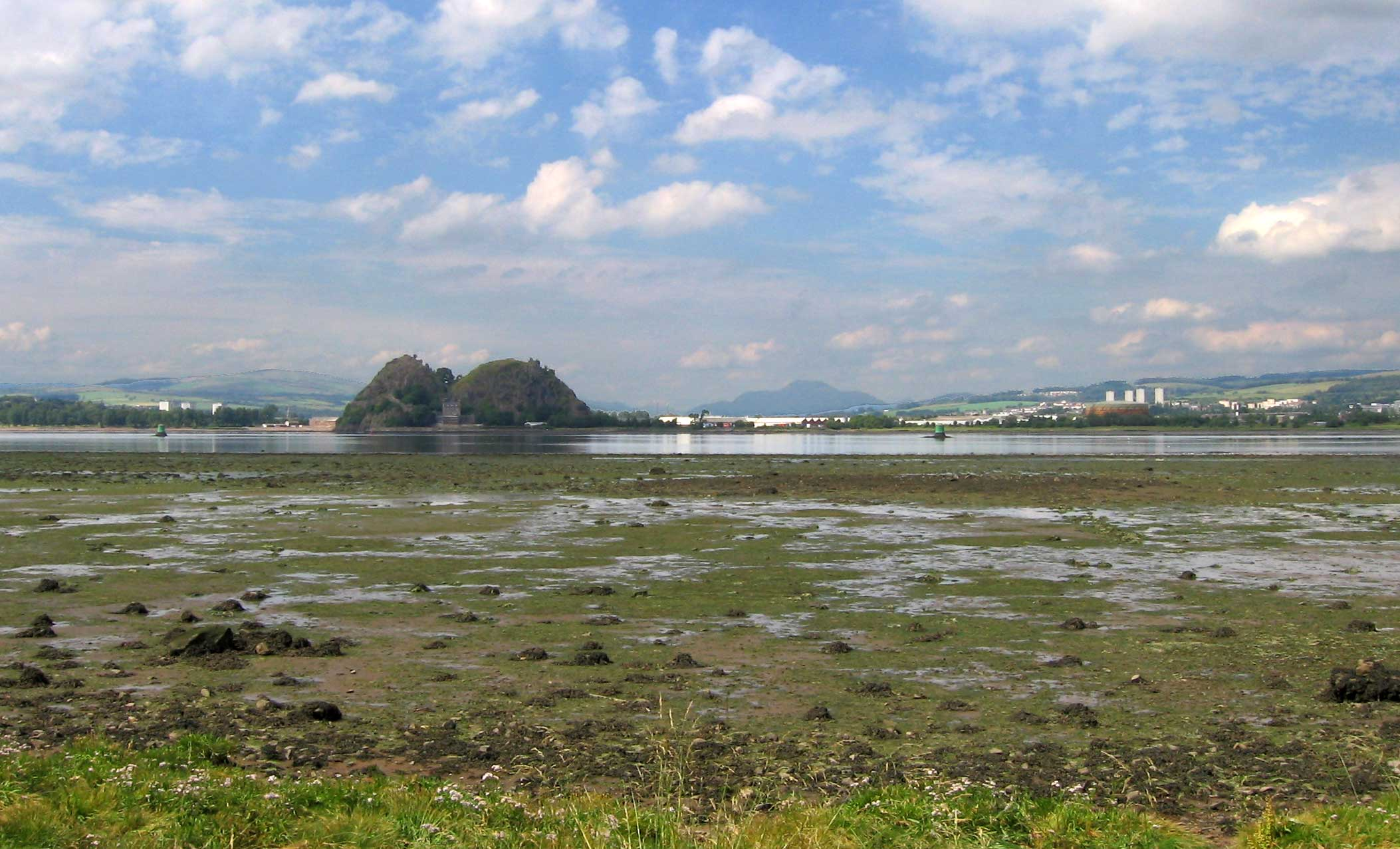
Altclut on the River Clyde at Dumbarton, seat of Bridei's father Beli

Bridei is described in a verse attributed to the broadly contemporary Adomnán as "son of the king of Dumbarton", indicating that he was the son of Beli, king of the British kingdom of Altclut; making Bridei also the grandson of Beli's predecessor Neithon son of Guipno; and the brother or half-brother of Beli's successor Eugein. The conflict between Bridei and Ecgfrith of Northumbria for Pictish supremacy is described in the poem Iniu feras Bruide cath ("Today Bridei Fights a Battle") as being over the legacy (forba) of Neithon, providing evidence that this Neithon son of Guipno, Bridei's grandfather, may have been the same person as the earlier Pictish king recorded as Nechtan grandson of Uerb, and that the Alt Clut dynasty into which Bridei was born may have had Pictish origins.

Nennius' Historia Brittonum tells us that Bridei was King Ecgfrith's fratruelis or maternal first cousin, suggesting Bridei's mother was probably a daughter of King Edwin of Deira, and half-sister of the Northumbrian princess Eanflæd. The marriage of Bridei's parents would have marked an accommodation between Edwin and Neithon, extending Northumbrian influence into the lands of the Picts and of the Britons of the Clyde.

== Life and reign ==
=== Early life ===
Bridei must have been born no later than 628, as the death of his father Beli of Alt Clut is recorded in the Annales Cambriae as taking place in 627. Bridei was probably brought up within the Northumbrian court, having possibly been taken there as a hostage by the Northumbrian king Oswiu after the killing of the Dal Riatan king Domnall Brecc by Bridei's half-brother Eugein of Alt Clut in 643.

=== Rise to power ===
Accession of Bridei to the Pictish kingship seems to have been due at least in part to the influence of the Northumbrian kings Oswiu and Ecgfrith. Bridei was passed over several times for the succession to both the Pictish and Alt Clut kingships, probably as the fall of his grandfather Edwin of Northumbria in 633 diminished political connectedness of Bridei, but the marriage of his aunt Eanflæd to the newly crowned King of Bernicia Oswiu in 642 would have seen him once again become well-connected to the centres of Northumbrian power.

Bridei became king after the expulsion in 671 of his predecessor Drest son of Donuel from his kingdom, which was probably centred around the northern Pictish district of Fortriu. This event is normally connected to the "Pictish rebellion" that culminated in the Battle of Two Rivers, suggesting Drest was leading an attempt to overthrow Northumbrian overlordship in the early years of the reign of Ecgfrith, after the death of Ecgfrith's powerful predecessor Oswiu. Stephen of Ripon records in his Life of St Wilfrid how the "bestial peoples of the Picts despised their subjection to the Saxons with a fierce disdain and threatened to throw off from themselves the yoke of servitude", before describing a Northumbrian victory so comprehensive it was "filling two rivers with corpses so that, amazing to say, the killers pursued the crowd of those fleeing, walking over the rivers dry foot". Stephen also records that Drest had "gathered together innumerable nations (gentes) from every nook and corner in the north", suggesting that the Pictish forces were not otherwise politically united.

The expulsion of Drest and his replacement by Bridei was probably engineered by the combined power of Ecgfrith and Pictish supporters of Bridei. Bridei would have seen himself as a subject of Ecgfrith in 671 and may have been initially subject to an overlord from a southern Pictish territory such as Beornhaeth, a possibility supported by the description in the Annals of Inisfallen of the later Battle of Dun Nechtain between Bridei and Ecgfrith as "a great battle between Picts".

=== Expansion ===
Elite sites probably attacked by Bridei between 679 and 685, alongside Burghead, the primary power centre of Bridei's own kingdom of Fortriu

Bridei seems have been actively intervening in the politics of Dál Riata in the early years of his reign. He may have been involved in the killing of Domangart mac Domnaill the king of Dál Riata in 673, and may also have entered into a three-way alliance with his nephew Dumnagual of Alt Clut and Finguine Fota of the Cenél Comgaill, king of Cowal and the grandfather of the later king of Fortriu Bridei son of Der-Ilei. The Annals of Ulster record that in 676 many Picts were drowned in Loch Awe, also suggesting an aggressive regime under Bridei attacking northern Dál Riata.

In the 680s Bridei seems to have turned his attention away from Argyll, with a campaign that started less than a year after the Northumbrian king Ecgfrith was weakened by his defeat by Æthelred of Mercia at the Battle of the Trent in 679. A series of conflicts recorded in Irish annals as taking place in northern Britain from 679 are likely to represent Bridei expanding his power base. The Annals of Ulster describe a siege of Dunnottar in 680. Bridei attacked first Dunbeath in Caithness and then Orkney in 682, a campaign so violent that the Annals of Ulster said that the Orkney Islands were "destroyed" by Bridei ("Orcades deletae sunt la Bruide"). With opposition removed from the north, sieges of Dundurn in Strathearn and Dunadd in mid Argyll are reported the following year. As with the earlier siege of Dunnottar, Bridei, though not explicitly named, was probably the assailant.

Together Dunnottar and Dundurn mark the northern and southern limits of the southern Pictish territory south of the Mounth, and their sieges indicate a period of sustained pressure by Bridei across the area. The pattern of high-status sites attacked in Bridei's campaigns suggests they were the centres of independent provinces that resisted his rule, as he built a confederation of territories by alliance or conquest that owed allegiance and tribute to him as king. Bridei's model of over-kingship seems closely modelled on the system of tribute employed by the Picts' own Northumbrian over-lords.

=== Dun Nechtain and aftermath ===
Possible locations of the Battle of Dun Nechtain

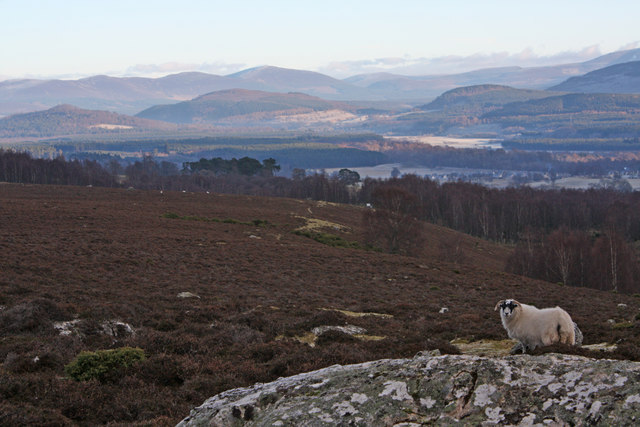
Dunachton in Badenoch

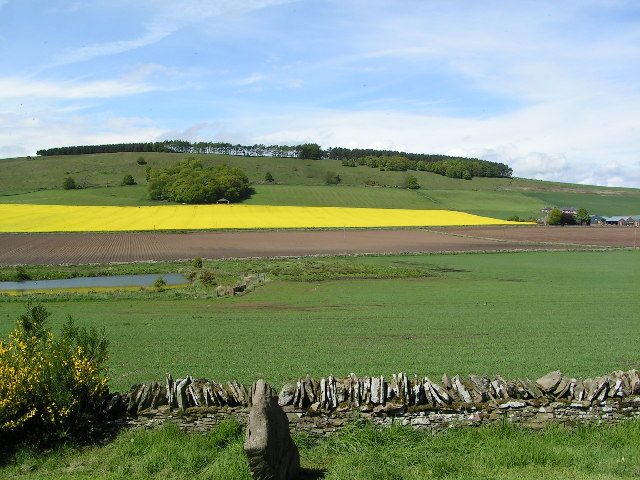
Dunnichen in Angus

Bridei's threat to the southern Pictish lands represented a challenge to Northumbrian hegemony, but the immediate cause of Ecgfrith's attack on the Picts in 685 was said by Bede to be Bridei ceasing to pay the Northumbrians tribute, possibly in response to the Northumbrian raid in 684 against Brega in Ireland, which was probably undertaken in response to an alliance between the Irish and the Britons. Ecgfrith sought to re-assert his dominance through a military campaign, and Bede describes how – against the advice of churchmen including St Cuthbert – Ecgfrith "rashly led an army to lay waste the province of the Picts".

Ecgfrith's incursion far into Pictish territory ended with the Battle of Dun Nechtain on the afternoon of Saturday 20 May 685, when Ecgfrith himself was killed and his army annihilated by Bridei's after being lured by the Picts into what Bede described as "the narrow passes of inaccessible mountains". The location of the battle is uncertain: since being identified in the early 19th century by the antiquarian George Chalmers on the basis of its placename it has generally been associated with Dunnichen in Angus, a location supported by the presence of a carved battle scene on one of the nearby Aberlemno Sculptured Stones; but since 2006 Dunachton in Badenoch has been suggested as a much better match for Bede's description, while similarly supported by the site's toponymy.

The immediate consequence of Bridei's victory at Dun Nechtain was the ending of Northumbrian overlordship over the lands of the Picts, of Dál Riata and of some British lands, though it is possible that Fife and Manau did not fall under the control of Fortriu until the later defeat of the Northumbrian Berhtred by Bridei son of Der-Ilei in 698. The Angles occupying Pictish lands either fled or were killed or enslaved, and the Anglian Trumwine who claimed to be "Bishop of the Picts" with authority over the Pictish church from his see at Abercorn, retired to Whitby in Northumbria. The ending of the tributary relationship between Gaelic, British and Pictish territories and Northumbria would have caused significant political disruption across all these northern polities.

Bridei's success in leading multiple Pictish provinces against an outside enemy would have served to legitimise his kingship, consolidate his extensive territorial control and promote the sense of the territories under his rule as a single cohesive community. The power vacuum left by the Northumbrian retreat in the southern Pictish lands gave Bridei and his successors the opportunity to install favoured leaders from existing southern dynasties in positions of power and to move new groups of allies into territory abandoned by the Northumbrians. Bridei's reign saw the Dal Riatan kindred the Cenel Comgaill rise in prominence, gaining territory in the area of modern Clackmannanshire in the wake of Northumbrian withdrawal. The marriage of Dargart mac Finguine of the Cenel Comgaill to Der-Ilei, mother of the later kings of Fortriu Bridei son of Der-Ilei and Naiton son of Der-Ilei and probably the daughter of Bridei, saw the kindred connected directly into the Pictish Royal household.

Bridei would have been at least 57 years old at the time of his victory at Dun Nechtain in 685. His death in 692 is recorded by both the Annals of Ulster and the Annals of Tigernach. He was buried on Iona, and mourned by Adomnán, the Abbot of Iona, to whom is attributed a surviving lament for Bridei's death.

== Legacy ==
Bridei is the first king to be explicitly described in contemporary sources as rex Fortrenn, or king of Fortriu, and his reign marks the start of a period that would be a turning point in the history of modern-day Scotland. Bridei's victory at the Battle of Dun Nechtain in 685, achieved by uniting various Pictish provinces under his leadership, ended Northumbrian rule north of the Forth and extended the power of Fortriu southwards beyond the Mounth. His reign marked the establishment of the pre-eminence of Fortriu as a Pictish province that saw it develop into the overkingdom of the Picts. Known to historians as the 'Verturian Hegemony', this led to the growth of a powerful Pictish state.

The overlordship of the kings of Fortriu that started with the reign of Bridei also saw the encouragement by its rulers of the idea that the Picts were a single people under a single king. Before Bridei's victory over Ecgfrith references in documents to the Picts used the plural term gentes, whereas afterwards they are referred to using the singular gens. The Pictish king lists that began circulating from the mid-7th century consciously sought to legitimise the Fortriu dynasty's dominance by constructing the idea of a single Pictish over-king, projected backwards before the historical horizon to create the impression of a single office of ancient provenance. It is likely that the Pictish origin myth known to Bede was composed around this time, and it is probably the period from Bridei's reign that saw the development of the common language of the Pictish symbol stones as a means of reinforcing the status of key members of society.

Bridei may have been the father or, less likely, the brother of Der-Ilei, the mother of the later Pictish kings Bridei son of Der-Ilei and Naiton son of Der-Ilei, and it is through her that they would have based their claim to the kingship of Fortriu after the overthrow by Bridei son of Der-Ilei (Bridei IV) of Bridei son of Beli's successor Taran son of Ainftech (Taran mac Ainftech). By the reign of these successors, it seems that the lands of the Picts initially brought under the control of Fortriu by Bridei son of Beli by military means were being perceived as a single nation under a single ruler.

== Bibliography ==
- Anderson, Marjorie O. (1973). Kings and Kingship in Early Scotland. Edinburgh: Scottish Academic Press.
- Clancy, Thomas Owen (2004). "Philosopher-king: Nechtan mac Der Ilei" (PDF). Scottish Historical Review. 83 (2): 125–149. doi:10.3366/shr.2004.83.2.125.
- Clancy, Thomas Owen; Márkus, Gilbert (1995). Iona: The Earliest Poetry of a Celtic Monastery. Edinburgh University Press. ISBN 0-7486-0531-2.
- Foster, Sally M. (2014). Picts, Scots and Gaels – Early Historic Scotland. Edinburgh: Birlinn. ISBN 9781780271910.
- Fraser, James E. (2006). The Pictish Conquest – The Battle of Dunnichen 685 and the birth of Scotland. Stroud: Tempus Publishing. ISBN 9780752439624.
- Fraser, James E. (2009). From Caledonia to Pictland: Scotland to 795. New Edinburgh History of Scotland. Edinburgh: Edinburgh University Press. ISBN 9780748612321.
- Grigg, Julianna (2015). The Philosopher King and the Pictish Nation. Dublin: Four Courts Press. ISBN 9781846825637.
- MacQuarrie, Alan (1993). "The Kings of Strathclyde". In Grant, A.; Stringer, K. (eds.). Medieval Scotland: Crown, Lordship and Community, Essays Presented to G. W. S. Barrow. Edinburgh: Edinburgh University Press. pp. 1–19. ISBN 9780748611102.
- Márkus, Gilbert (2017). Conceiving a Nation: Scotland to A.D. 900. New History of Scotland. Edinburgh: Edinburgh University Press. ISBN 9780748678983.
- Noble, Gordon; Evans, Nicholas (2022). The Picts: Scourge of Rome, Rulers of the North. Edinburgh: Birlinn. ISBN 9781780277783.
- Woolf, Alex (1998). "Pictish matriliny reconsidered". The Innes Review. 49 (2): 147–167. doi:10.3366/inr.1998.49.2.147.
- Woolf, Alex (2006). "Dun Nechtain, Fortriu and the Geography of the Picts". Scottish Historical Review. 85 (220): 182–201. doi:10.1353/shr.2007.0029.

Regnal titles
Preceded by Drest son of Donuel	King of the Picts; 672–693	Succeeded by Taran mac Ainftech
