= Túathalán =

Túathalán (died c. 747) was an 8th-century abbot of Cennrigmonaid. He is known only from his obituary in the Annals of Ulster. Some say he was Irish in origin and call him Tuathal.

Cennrigmonaid, literally "head of the king's pastureland", is a site associated with later St. Andrews, and is probably that site's former name. Túathalán is the first cleric associated with a church establishment there, and Túathalán's obituary constitutes the first source for both the existence of a church there and for the existence of the population centre itself. The church was likely founded around the beginning of the 8th century, probably by Óengus I mac Fergusa, King of the Picts, although King Nechtan mac Der-Ile may also have been responsible. Túathalán may therefore have been the first ever abbot of the location. There was probably a Hexham connection. The latter was a monastic establishment whose writings show a good deal of knowledge about the Picts, and who share a dedication to St. Andrew.

== Sources ==
- Anderson, Alan Orr, Scottish Annals from English Chroniclers: AD 500–1286, (London, 1908), republished, Marjorie Anderson (ed.) (Stamford, 1991)
- Forsyth, Kathryn, "Evidence of a Lost Pictish source in the Historia Regum Anglorum of Symeon of Durham", in Simon Taylor (ed.) Kings, Clerics, and Chronicles in Scotland, 500-1297: Essays in Honour of Marjorie Ogilvie Anderson on the Occasion of Her Ninetieth Birthday, (Dublin, 2000), pp. 19–32; Appendix by John Koch, pp. 33–4
- Woolf, Alex, "Onuist son of Uurguist:Tyrannus Carnifex or a David for the Picts", in David Hill & Margaret Worthington (eds.), Æthelbald and Off, Two Eighth-Century Kings of Mercia: Papers from a Conference held in Manchester in 2000, (Manchester, 2005), pp. 35–42.

Religious titles
Preceded by ?	Abbot of Cennrigmonaid d. 747	Succeeded by ?
