= Alpín I of the Picts =

King of the Picts from 726 to 728

King of the Picts
- Reign: 726–728
- Predecessor: Drest VII
- Successor: Nechtan III

Alpín was king of the Picts from 726–728, together with Drest VII. The Pictish Chronicle king lists give Alpín and Drest a five-year joint rule.

In 724, Nechtan mac Der-Ilei is reported in the Annals of Tigernach to have abdicated in favour of Drest, entering a monastery. Alpín, who is associated with Drest in the Pictish Chronicle king lists, is not mentioned at this time. In 726, the Annals of Tigernach report that "Drest was cast from the kingdom of the Picts and Alpín reigned in his stead".

In 728–729, a war in Pictland involving Alpín, Drest, Nechtan and Óengus is reported in various sources. Alpín appears to have been the initial opponent of Nechtan and Óengus. He was first defeated by Óengus at Monaidh Craeb, for which Moncreiffe Island near Perth has been suggested, where his son was killed. A second defeat led to Alpín's flight and Nechtan being restored as king. Drest was killed the following year, but Alpín's fate is not known.

Whether this Alpín has any connection to the "Elffin son of Crup" who the Annals of Ulster say was besieged in 742, by whom is not said, is not known. Likewise, whether there is any connection between this Alpín and the Alpín mac Echdach who may have ruled in Dál Riata in the 730s is also unknown. Anderson notes that the capture of "Elén son of Corp and of Conamail son of Cano" is recorded by the Annals of Ulster circa 673. This Conamail was probably the Conamail son of Cano killed in 705.

If the report of 742 refers to this Alpín, then his father's name was Crup. Some versions of the Pictish Chronicle king lists include a king named Alpín son of Feret or Feredach, but this appears to be the later king, Alpín II, Alpín son of Uuroid. The small number of sources which refer to a king named Alpín son of Óengus, again probably refer to Alpín II.

== Sources ==
- Anderson, Alan Orr, Early Sources of Scottish History A.D. 500–1286, volume 1. Reprinted with corrections, Paul Watkins, Stamford, 1990. ISBN 1-871615-03-8

Regnal titles
Preceded by Drest VII	King of the Picts; 726–728	Succeeded by Nechtan III
