= Prior of Restenneth =

The Prior of Restenneth (later Commendator of Restenneth) was the head of the Augustinian canons of Restenneth Priory, Angus. The following is a list of priors and commendators:

== List of priors ==
- Robert, 1147x1159-1162
- William, 1178- 1189x1194
- Hugh, 1198-1205
- Berengar, 1206
- John, 1219x1238
- Germanus, 1218 x, 1224 x
- William, 1267
- A[???], x1292
- Robert, 1296
- William, 1317x1321
- Bernard, 1320
- John de Eskdale, 1324 x 1327-1330
- Alexander de Falkirk, 1347-1369
- John Marsyale, 1388
- Thomas de Eskdale, 1408
- James de Keith, 1411-1419
- John Hunter, 1430
- Nicholas Crawford, 1445 xc. 1464
- James Dunmain (Dunmanning), c.1464 - 1470
  - Henry Barrie, 1465 -1466
  - John Woodman, 1465 x 1468
- William Lindsay, 1470 -1471 x 1476
- William Forfar, 1474
- William Rutherford, 1484 -1494
- Thomas Kinnear, 1490 -1492
- Alexander Farnese, 1494
- David Guthrie, 1494
- Alexander Menteith, 1494-1516
- Thomas Nudre, 1513-1523
- John Hovinan (Home), 1523-1547
- David Douglas, 1530 -1533
- Robert Cottis, 1531-1534

== List of commendators ==
- Andrew Home, 1547-1593

== Bibliography ==
- Cowan, Ian B. & Easson, David E., Medieval Religious Houses: Scotland With an Appendix on the Houses in the Isle of Man, Second Edition, (London, 1976), p. 95-6
- Watt, D.E.R. & Shead, N.F. (eds.), The Heads of Religious Houses in Scotland from the 12th to the 16th Centuries, The Scottish Records Society, New Series, Volume 24, (Edinburgh, 2001), pp. 182–86

== See also ==
- Restenneth Priory
