= Fortriu =

Pictish kingdom in Scotland, 4th-10th centuries

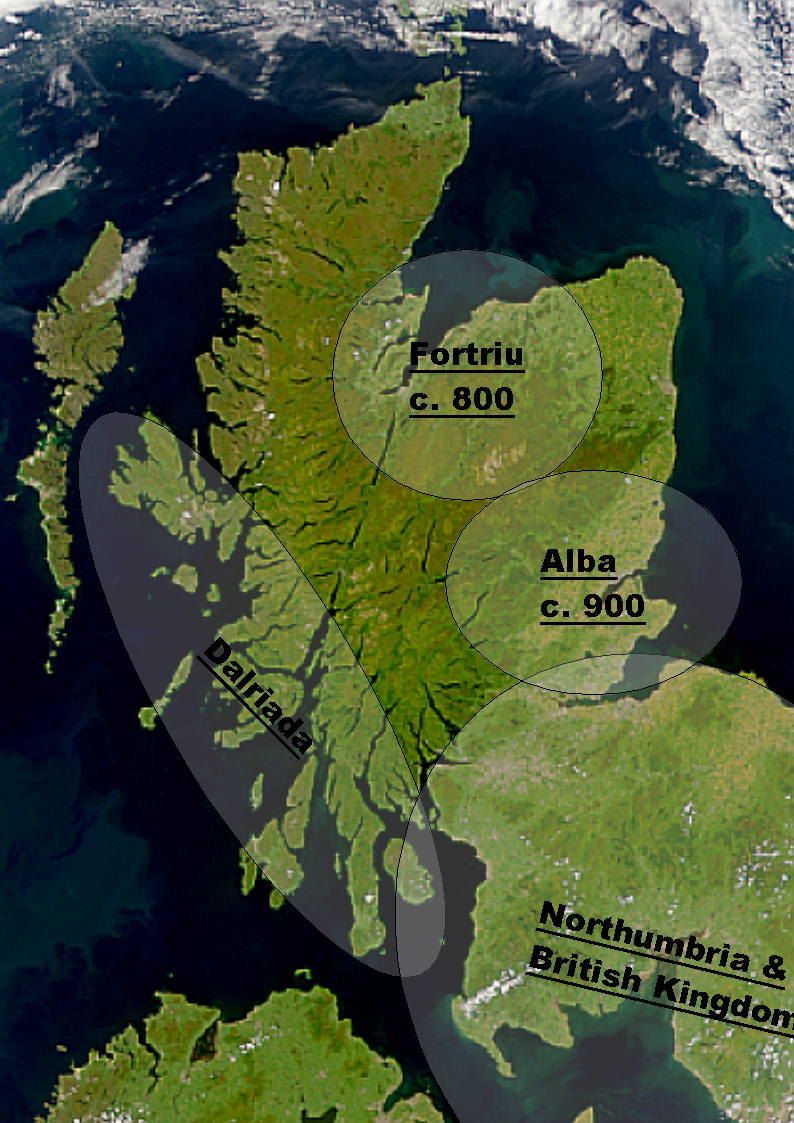
Approximate location of Fortriu

Fortriu (Latin: Verturiones; Old Irish: *Foirtrinn; Old English: Wærteras; Pictish: *Uerteru) was a Pictish kingdom recorded between the 4th and 10th centuries. It was traditionally believed to be located in and around Strathearn in central Scotland, but is more likely to have been based in the north, in the Moray and Easter Ross area. Fortriu is a term used by historians as it is not known what name its people used to refer to their polity. Historians also sometimes use the name synonymously with Pictland in general.

== Name ==
The only survived indigenous writings left by the people of Fortriu are ogham inscriptions, but the name they used to describe themselves is unrecorded. They were first documented in the late 4th century by the Roman historian Ammianus Marcellinus, who referred to them in Latin as the Verturiones (or Vecturiones). The Latin root verturio has been connected etymologically by John Rhys with the later Welsh word gwerthyr, meaning "fortress", suggesting that both came from a Common Brittonic root vertera, and implying that the group's name meant "Fortress People". Mallory & Adams saw the name as representing tu(:)rjones, derived from Indo European tur meaning "mighty", with the intensive prefix *wer. A reconstructed form in the Pictish language would be something like *Uerteru.

A connected Old Irish form of the name appears from the 6th to the 10th centuries in the Annals of Ulster and later sources, which contain repeated references to rex Fortrenn, ("the King of Fortriu"), la firu Fortrenn ("the men of Fortriu") and Maigh Fortrenn ("the plain of Fortriu"), alongside references to battles occurring i Fortrinn ("in Fortriu"). These are examples of a common pattern of Goidelic languages rendering with an f what in Brittonic languages is U/V, W or Gw. The word Fortriu is a modern reconstruction of a nominative form for this word that has survived only in these genitive and dative cases. Anglo-Saxon sources, from the Anglo-Saxon Chronicle in the 6th century to Bede in the 8th century, refer to the group using the Old English form of the name Wærteras.

Modern scholars writing in English usually refer to the kingdom using the name Fortriu and the adjective Verturian, and use the name the Wærteras to refer to the people as an ethnic group.

== History ==
=== Roman Iron Age ===
Fortriu is first recorded by the Roman author Ammianus Marcellinus, who writing in c. 392 used the Latin name Verturiones to describe one of the two gentes or "peoples" of the Picts who took part in the Great Conspiracy of 367–368. Although alongside the Dicalydones they are clearly described as Pictish, at this time this may just have been a pejorative Roman word for unromanised Britons. The Verturiones were probably based like their successors around the Moray Firth. It is not clear what relationship they had to earlier peoples documented in the same area, such as the Vacomagi and Decantae surveyed under Agricola in the 1st century and listed in Ptolemy's Geography, but archeological discoveries at Birnie near Elgin indicate that Rome had remained in diplomatic contact with the area throughout the 2nd century.

The Verturiones may have emerged as part of a pattern seen in other Roman frontier zones such as Germany, where areas beyond the border saw population groups amalgamating into fewer but larger political units.

As well as the two Pictish groupings, the conspiracy of 367–368 included Scotti from Ireland; Attacotti whose origins are uncertain but likely to have been somewhere within the British Isles; and Franks and Saxons from across the North Sea; suggesting high levels of intercommunication between the Verturiones and the peoples of Ireland and continental Europe. The conspiracy may have been caused by a decline in the level of subsidies given to barbarian tribes by the emperor Valentinian. The fact that Fullofaudes, the leader of the northern Roman troops, was captured rather than killed suggests that the Pictish invaders may have been motivated mainly by extracting treasure.

=== Verturian hegemony ===
After the 4th century Fortriu is not explicitly mentioned in documentary sources until 664, but there are indications that Fortriu's later power may have been foreshadowed in the late 6th century. Adomnan's Life of Columba describes the stronghold of the Pictish king Bridei son of Maelchon, who ruled from 554 to 584, as being by the River Ness, in or near to the heartland of Fortriu. Bridei is depicted by Adomnan as overlord of a regulus or "underking" of Orkney, and was separately described by the Northumbrian historian Bede as rex potentissimus or "very powerful king". Irish annals record a "flight" or "migration" of Gaels "before the son of Mailcon" between 558 and 560, suggesting that by then Bridei's power may have been extending into the territory of Cenél Loairn in Dál Riata, at the opposite end of the Great Glen from Fortriu, and Adomnan records a slave girl from Dál Riata at Bridei's court at the time of Columba's visit.

By the end of the 7th century Fortriu had established a dominant position over most or all of the Picts, one of the most significant developments in the history of early medieval Scotland, described by historians as the Verturian Hegemony. The status of Fortriu as a powerful over-kingdom can be seen from the reign of Bridei son of Beli, who was the first king to be explicitly described as "King of Fortriu" in contemporary chronicles, and whose victory over Ecgfrith of Northumbria at the Battle of Dun Nechtain in 685 extended Fortriu's power southward, replacing Northumbrian rule north of the Forth. Bridei had possibly been a sub-king of the Northumbrians at the start of his reign in 671, but began to extend his power with a siege of Dunottar in 680 and an attack on Orkney in 681. As the influence of the kings of Fortriu grew they promoted the idea of the Picts as a single people with a single king, playing a key role in uniting the Picts and establishing a self-conscious Pictish identity.

The continuing power of the kings of Fortriu over the Picts can be seen in the activities of Bridei son of Beli's successors. Bridei son of Derilei and the cleric Curetán of Rosemarkie were the only Pictish signatories to Cáin Adomnáin or "Law of the Innocents" in 697, indicating that Bridei was able to enforce adherence of the Picts as a whole; while Nechtan son of Derilei's church reforms of the 710s were described by Bede as being enacted "throughout all the provinces of the Picts". The kings of Fortriu maintained their control over southern Pictish territories in the 7th and 8th centuries by planting them with loyal Gaelic lords and their military retinues; creating provinces named after leading Gaelic kindreds including Cenél Comgaill in Strathearn, Cenél nÓengusa in Angus and Cenél nGabráin in Gowrie.

A series of campaigns under Onuist son of Uurguist between 731 and 741 saw this power extended further with the invasion and conquest of the Gaelic kingdom of Dál Riata, located in the area of modern-day Argyll. Onuist became the first Pictish king known to have invaded Northumbria and Strathclyde and may even have invaded Ireland, establishing a domination over northern Britain unmatched by any preceding king, that would not be rivalled again for another 150 years.

A period of instability in Fortriu following the death of Elphin son of Wrad in 780 saw four rulers in quick succession – three from the family of Onuist son of Uurguist – and allowed Dál Riata to reassert its independence. The succession of Constantín son of Uurguist to the kingship of Fortriu in 789 was challenged by the Dál Riatan king Conall mac Taidg, but Constantín proved to be strong leader and reigned through to his death in 820.

=== The Viking Age ===
The dominance of Fortriu and the House of Uurguist, which had lasted for over fifty years and for much of that period had also extended to Gaelic Dál Riata and the Britons of Strathclyde, came to a sudden and dramatic end with a decisive defeat by Vikings in the Battle of 839. The Annals of Ulster record the deaths in the battle of the king of Fortriu, Wen son of Onuist, and his brother Bran son of Onuist, together with the king of Dál Riata Áed mac Boanta – suggesting Dál Riata was still under Pictish control – alongside "others almost innumerable". The fact that so many were slain, including the kings of both Fortriu and Dál Riata, suggests that Wen had had time to gather his forces, and that this was the culmination of a campaign rather than a fortuitous raid. This was one of the most important and decisive battles in British history and although its location is uncertain it probably took place in the heartland of Fortriu on the shores of the Moray Firth.

The Viking Kings of Dublin Amlaíb and Auisle are recorded in the Annals of Ulster going to Fortriu and plundering "the entire Pictish nation" in 866. Although the chronology of written sources is confused, they probably occupied Fortriu for three years and took hostages, before attacking Dumbarton Rock in 870 and returning to Dublin in 871, bringing with them "a great prey of English, and Britons and Picts."

=== Fragmentation and disappearance ===
Fortriu continued to be recorded into the early 10th century, suggesting a degree of continuity with the earlier period of over-kingship. The Annals of Ulster record the "men of Fortriu" killing the Scandinavian leader Ímar ua Ímair in 904, four years after it had started using the description ri Alban for the King of Alba. The last dated reference to Fortriu in any of the Irish Annals is for 918 in the Fragmentary Annals of Ireland, where the phrases "Men of Fortriu" and "Men of Alba" are treated as synonymous. The Historia Regum Anglorum describes King Aethelstan of England wasting Scotia as far as Dunottar and Wertermorum – the "muir of Fortriu" – in 934, indicating that Fortriu was still recognised at this stage as a reference for features in the landscape.

The complete disappearance of the name Fortriu beyond this point suggests that it fragmented into its successor polities – the provinces of Moray and Ross – during the 10th century. Moray is first recorded in an entry in the Chronicle of the Kings of Alba for the reign of Malcolm I, which lasted from 943 to 954; while Ross first appears in the documentary record in a hagiography of the Scottish-born saint Cathróe of Metz, written in Metz between 971 and 976.

== Location ==
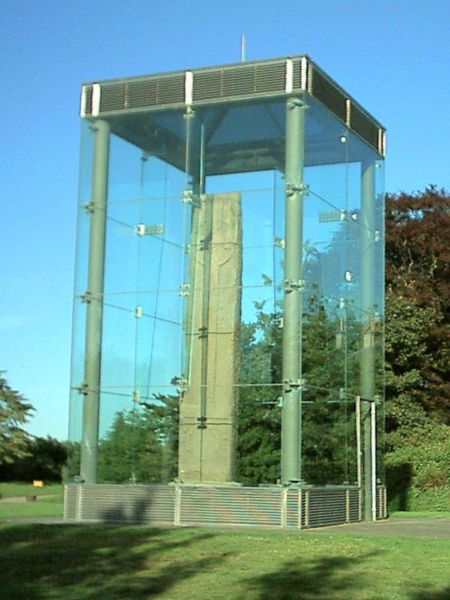
Sueno's Stone, located in Forres. This large post-Pictish monument marks some kind of military triumph.

From the 19th century until 2006 most historians believed that the kingdom recorded as Fortriu in the Irish annals lay south of the Mounth in present-day central Scotland, based on the work of E. W. Robertson and W. F. Skene. Robertson, in his 1862 work Scotland under her Early Kings, identified Fortriu as comprising Clackmannanshire, Menteith and west Fife on the left bank of the Forth, arguing that the names of both Fortriu and the medieval deanery of Fothriff derived from an earlier hypothetical *Forthreim, which he translated as "Forth Realm". This argument is based on unsound etymology, however, as Fothriff derives from the Gaelic words foithir and Fib and means "district appended to Fife", while Fortriu is related to the earlier Latin name Verturiones. Skene, in his 3 volume work Celtic Scotland: A History of Ancient Alban, published between 1876 and 1880, identified Fortriu with Strathearn and Menteith, the first province listed in the 12th century document De Situ Albanie, on the basis that a battle recorded by the Chronicle of the Kings of Alba as taking place in Sraith Herenn was also recorded by the Annals of Ulster as the killing of Ímar ua Ímair by the "Men of Fortriu". This argument is also inconclusive, however: Sraith Herenn could refer to either Strathearn in Perthshire, south of the Mounth; or Strathdearn, the valley of the River Findhorn in Moray, north of the Mounth; while the fact that Ímar was killed by the "Men of Fortriu" does not prove that he was killed within the territory of Fortriu. Despite Skene's initial suggestion being tentative, this identification of Fortriu as including western Perthshire became established as a consensus.

However, new research by Alex Woolf seems to have destroyed this consensus, if not the idea itself. A northern recension of the Anglo-Saxon Chronicle makes it clear that Fortriu was north of the Mounth (i.e., the eastern Grampians), in the area visited by Columba. The long poem known as The Prophecy of Berchán, written perhaps in the 12th century, but purporting to be a prophecy made in the Early Middle Ages, says that Dub, King of Scotland was killed in the Plain of Fortriu. Another source, the Chronicle of the Kings of Alba, indicates that King Dub was killed at Forres, a location in Moray. Additions to the Chronicle of Melrose confirm that Dub was killed by the men of Moray at Forres.

The Prophecy of Berchán states that "Mac Bethad, the glorious king of Fortriu, will take [Scotland]." As Macbeth, King of Scotland may have been Mormaer of Moray before he became King of Scots, it is possible that Fortriu was understood to be interchangeable with Moray in the High Middle Ages. Fortriu is also mentioned as one of the seven ancient Pictish kingdoms in the 13th-century source known as De Situ Albanie.

There can be little or no doubt then that Fortriu centred on northern Scotland. Other Pictish scholars, such as James E. Fraser are now taking it for granted that Fortriu was in the north of Scotland, centred on Moray and Easter Ross, where most early Pictish monuments are located.

== See also ==
- Province of Moray
- Kingdom of Alba
