= St Andrews Sarcophagus =

Coordinates: 56°20′22″N 2°47′15″W

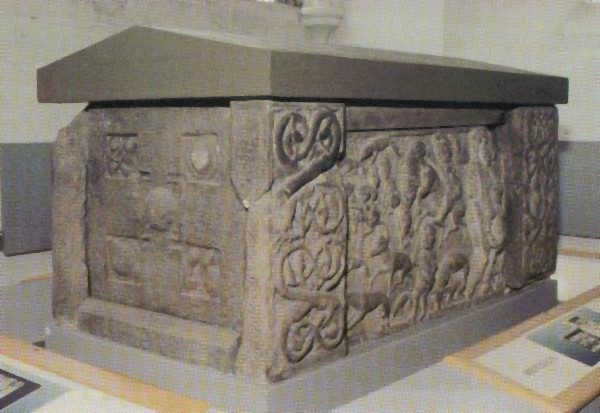
The St Andrews Sarcophagus, with a modern roof.

The Saint Andrews Sarcophagus is a Pictish monument dating from the second half of the 8th century. The sarcophagus was recovered beginning in 1833 during excavations by St Andrew's Cathedral in Scotland, and in 1922 the surviving components were reunited. The sarcophagus is on display at the Cathedral museum in St Andrews, close to the site of its discovery.

== Description ==
As originally constructed the sarcophagus would have comprised two side panels, two end panels, four corner pieces and a roof slab. The roof slab is entirely missing, as are most of one side and one end panel and a corner piece so that the extant sarcophagus is essentially L-shaped. The external dimensions of the sarcophagus are 177 by 90 cm (70 by 35 in) and a height of 70 cm (28 in). The stone used is a local sandstone.

The surviving side panel shows, from right to left, a figure breaking the jaws of a lion, a mounted hunter with his sword raised to strike a leaping lion, and a hunter on foot, armed with a spear and assisted by a hunting dog, about to attack a wolf. Although it is not certain that the first two figures represent the same person, 19th-century illustrations depict them as if they are. The surviving end panel is much simpler, essentially a cross with four small panels between the arms. The fragments of the missing end panel are similar, but not identical, to the surviving one.

== Discovery ==
The sarcophagus was discovered within the grounds of the cathedral near the St Regulus Chapel. The cathedral had been in use from when it was constructed during the 1100s until it was stripped of all its altars and images, left in ruins and abandoned after 1559 during the Scottish Reformation. Much of its remaining stonework was recycled over the years into buildings in the town of St Andrews.

In the course of digging a grave in 1833, workmen discovered the remaining large fragments of the sarcophagus at a depth of about 6 to 8 feet (1.8 to 2.4 m). Through the years various casts of the pieces were made, but the original pieces were not reassembled until 1922.

== Historical opinion ==
Historians differ on who was likely to have been interred in the sarcophagus. Although it is generally presumed that it was commissioned by the Pictish King Óengus, or Onuist, a Christian who died in 761, whether it was actually used for his corpse, for his predecessor, Nechtan mac Der Ilei, or for a later personage is unclear.
