= Dunagoil =

Vitrified fort or dun on the Isle of Bute, Scotland

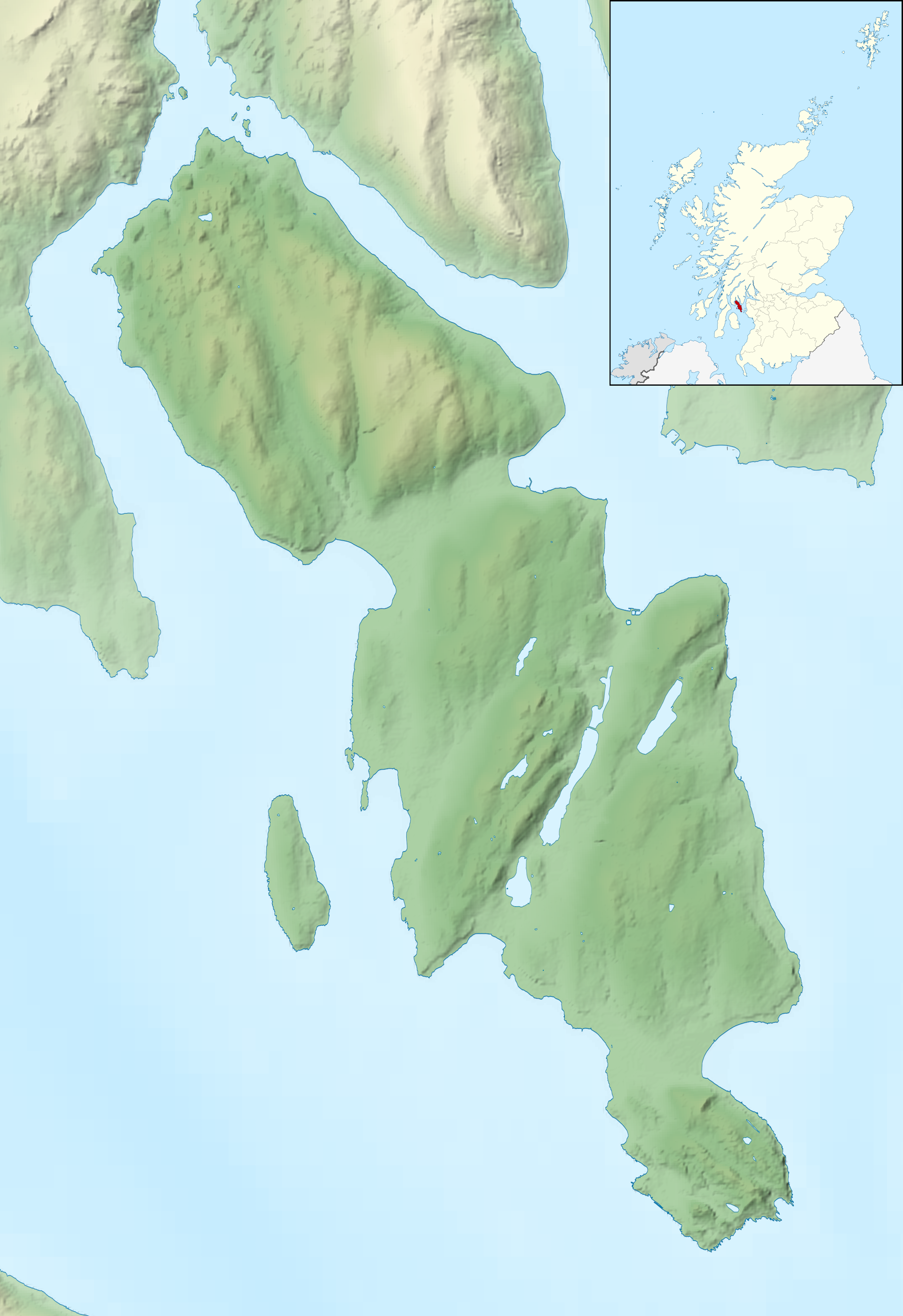
- Location within Bute
- 55.734°N 5.051°W
- Type: hill fort
- Periods: Iron Age
- Location: Isle of Bute
- Region: Scotland

Site notes
- Material: wood and stone
- Length: 300 ft (91 m)
- Width: 75 ft (23 m)

Dunagoil is a vitrified fort or dun on the Isle of Bute – an Iron Age hill fort whose ramparts have been melted by intense heat. It stands on a volcanic headland and gives its name to the bay that it overlooks. Like other places, such as Donegal, its name is from the Gaelic dún na gall – fort of the foreigners.
