= Drest VII =

King of the Picts from 724 to 726

King of the Picts
- Reign: 724–726
- Predecessor: Nechtan III
- Successor: Alpín I of the Picts
- Died: 732

Drest was king of the Picts from 724 until 726. He succeeded Nechtan mac Der-Ilei when the latter abdicated and entered a monastery in 724.

Neither the Annals of Ulster nor the Annals of Tigernach, name Drest's father. The earlier versions of the Pictish Chronicle king lists simply name "Drest and Elpin" as kings after Nechtan. However, a late version, which includes Nechtan's second reign in 728–729, makes Drest's father one Talorgan. This version includes the otherwise unknown Carnach son of Ferach and Óengus son of Bridei and is generally not such as would inspire great confidence.

Since Nechtan abdicated in favour of Drest, some kinship between them seems probable. A number of Nechtan's sons are reported to have died, so that Drest, whether a nephew, a son-in-law or cousin may have been Nechtan's nearest male kin. It may be that Drest was the son of the Talorg son of Drostan, "brother of Nechtan" – a half-brother or perhaps a foster brother – who had been imprisoned in 713.

Whatever his descent, Drest's rule appears to have been quickly challenged. In 725, Simul son of Drest was imprisoned, but by whom is unknown. In 726 Nechtan was imprisoned by Drest, following which Alpín, the Alpín of the king lists, deposed Drest.

By 728 it appears that Drest, Nechtan, Alpín and Óengus mac Fergusa were engaged in a war for the Pictish throne. Drest was killed in battle against Óengus at Dromo Dergg Blathuug (possibly Drumderg, near Blairgowrie) in 729.

Whether there is any relationship between this Drest and the Talorgan son of Drest, king of Atholl, who was killed by drowning in 739, can only be speculation. Drest, Talorgan, and their variants are common Pictish names, too common for any argument on the basis of anthroponymy to be entirely convincing.

Regnal titles
| Preceded by Nechtan III | King of the Picts; 724–726 | Succeeded by Alpín I |
