= Trumwine of Abercorn =

Bishop of the Northumbrian see of the Picts

Trumwine (Latin: Trumuinus) was the only ever Bishop of the Northumbrian see of the Picts, based at Abercorn.

Trumwine was a contemporary and friend of St. Cuthbert. In 681, during the reign of King Ecgfrith of Northumbria, Trumwine was appointed "Bishop of the Picts" by Theodore of Tarsus, then Archbishop of Canterbury ("Bishop of those Picts who were then subject to English rule", i.e. those living north of the River Forth paying tribute to Northumbria). This was part of a more general division of the Northumbrian church by the Archbishop, who also divided the Bishopric of Hexham from the Bishopric of Lindisfarne.

After the defeat and death of Ecgfrith at the Battle of Nechtansmere in 685, Trumwine and his monks fled and dispersed. He retired to the monastery at Whitby, then ruled by Ælflæd, Ecgfrith's sister and St. Hild's successor.

It is possible that Trumwine was present at the aforementioned battle, and certainly he would have been a valuable source of advice for Ecgfrith. Whatever the case here, the Anglo-Saxons were defeated, expelled from Southern Pictland, and the episcopal establishment at Abercorn was hence abandoned and the diocese ceased to exist. The territory of modern West Lothian hence probably passed into the hands of the Verturian kings, although it is also possible that the British of Strathclyde took it over.

In his days after 685, it is known that Trumwine interacted with Bede, and Bede's Life of Saint Cuthbert tells us that Trumwine was used as one of its sources. Trumwine is said to have related a story about Saint Cuthbert's childhood, which in turn had supposedly been told to Trumwine by Cuthbert himself.

He was buried in Saint Peter's church in Whitby.
