= Gille Coluim the Marischal =

Gille Coluim the Marischal was an official of the Scottish crown in the second half of the 12th century. His name occurs in the witness lists of two extant charters, both issued by King William of Scotland at Perth, which indicates that he was probably a native of somewhere in southern Perthshire. He seems in fact to have been the lord of Madderty in Strathearn. In either 1172 or 1173 he witnessed King William's grant of Ardross to Merleswain mac Cholbaín, a relative of the mormaer of Fife.; and somewhere between 1178 and 1185 he witnessed the king's grant of lands in Inverness-shire to Gille Brigte, Mormaer of Strathearn. In both of these charters, the grants are to native Scots and Gille Coluim appears alongside other native Scots, such as (in both cases) Gille Críst mac ingine Samuel ("Gillecrist mac inien Samüel") and Gille Míchéil mac Donnchada ("Gillemichel mac Dunecan"). Gille Coluim in both cases appears with the title "Marescal", meaning that he was the king's military commander. It appears to be in this role that Gille Coluim was given control of the castle at Auldearn ("Heryn") in Moray during a rebellion by the Meic Uilleim, a royal kindred who were claiming the throne of Scotland. A charter issued by King William at Linlithgow, between 1187 and 1189 grants Gille Brigte, mormaer of Strathearn, the land of Madderty and states that neither Gille Coluim nor his heirs have any right to the land after giving up Auldearn to the Meic Uilleim. In the charter, King William declares that Gille Coluim

"feloniously surrendered my castle of Heryn and then went over to my mortal enemies in the manner of a wicked traitor and stood with them against me to do as much harm as he could".

We can be certain then that Gille Coluim surrendered the castle during the insurrection of Domnall MacUilleim ("Donald MacWilliam") which took place between 1179 and 1187. Nothing more is heard of Gille Coluim. The charter indicates that Gille Coluim was not dead at the time of issue (no later than 1190) and his death is not otherwise reported.
