= Curetán =

7th-century Roman Catholic Bishop

Saint Curetán

Bishop
- Born: 7th century
- Died: 8th century
- Venerated in: Roman Catholic Church, Eastern Orthodox Church, Scottish Episcopal Church

Saint Curetán (Latin: Curitanus, Kiritinus, or Boniface) was a Scoto-Pictish bishop and saint, (fl. between 690 and 710). He is listed as one of the witnesses in the Cáin Adomnáin, where he is called "Curetan epscop". In the Martyrology of Tallaght he is called "of Ross Mand Bairend", and in the Martyrology of O'Gorman he is styled "bishop and abbot of Ross maic Bairend". His bishopric is usually held to have been Ross, the seat of which was at the settlement in the Black Isle called Ros-Maircnidh or Rosemarkie, named after the adjacent promontory.

A hagiography of Curetán is found in the sixteenth century manuscript known as the Aberdeen Breviary, where his vita occurs under the name "Boniface". In this hagiography, his Latin name is accompanied by a story of his Hebrew origins, a descendant of the sister of Saint Peter and Saint Andrew, who was first ordained as a priest by the Patriarch of Jerusalem, before travelling to Rome and becoming Pope, later resigning and moving to Pictland. The story is similar to that in the Life of St. Serf, and it has been conjectured that both were the product of the Romanizing faction in the Easter Controversy.

The Breviary also connects Curetán with King Nechtan mac Der-Ilei, whose brother Bridei was also a guarantor of the Cáin Adomnáin in 697. Nechtan consulted Abbot Ceolfrith of Monkwearmouth–Jarrow Abbey regarding the dating of Easter and finding the abbot persuasive adopted the Roman practice. Bede stated that Nechtan placed the churches of the Picts under the protection of St. Peter. Curetán-Boniface is also associated with the churches of Restenneth and Invergowrie, churches which, like Rosemarkie, both have dedications to Saint Peter.

There are place-name commemorations to Saint Curetán along Glen Urquhart, Strathglass, Glen Glass, Loch Ness and the Cromarty Firth. There are also dedications to St Peter and Boniface in Orkney. Barbara Yorke suggests that Curetán was an influential figure in Pictland, and played a significant role, after the adoption of the "Roman Easter" and tonsure, to help bring the Pictish church into closer contact with other areas of the western church.

== Veneration ==
His liturgical celebration is 14 March.

There is a clootie well near the village of Munlochy on Black Isle is dedicated to Saint Curetán, whose intercession is believed effective in curing lepers.

The Scottish Episcopal parish in Ardgay is named in honor of St.Curetán.
