= Comgall mac Domangairt =

6th-century Gaelic king

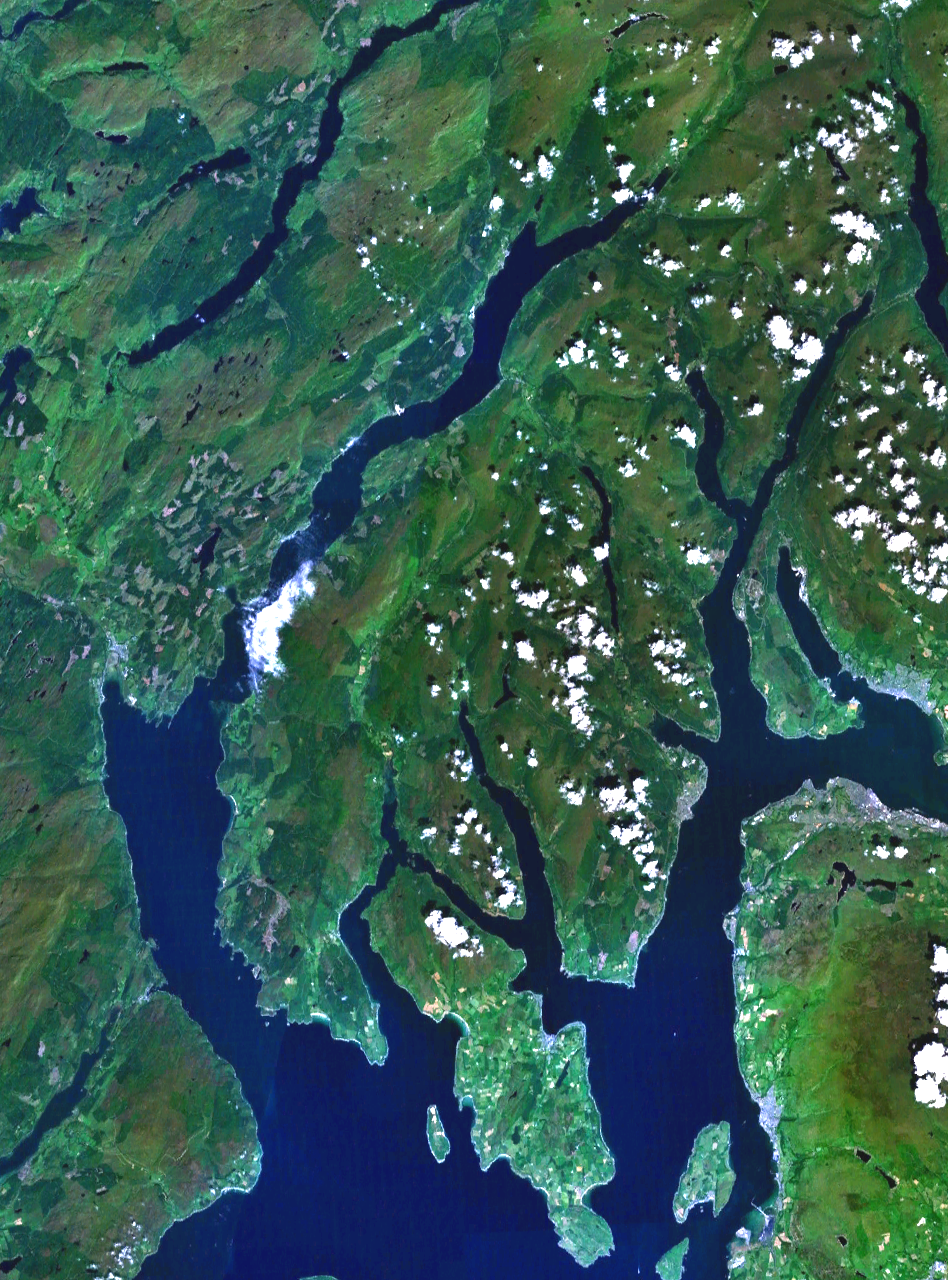
NASA Landsat image of the Cowal peninsula and the isle of Bute. Parts of Kintyre and Knapdale, the lands of the Cenél nGabráin, can be seen on the left side; the lands of the Cenél Loairn lie beyond the top left corner of the image; Dumbarton Rock, chief place of the kingdom of Alt Clut, lies further up the river Clyde seen in the middle right.

Comgall mac Domangairt was king of Dál Riata in the early 6th century. He was the son of Domangart Réti and grandson of Fergus Mór. The Annals of Ulster report his death in 538, 542 and 545, the Annals of Tigernach in 537.

== Comgall ==
Nothing certain is known of Comgall beyond the fact of his death, but he is significant as the eponymous founder of the Cenél Comgaill, one of the kindreds of Dál Riata named by the Senchus fer n-Alban. The Senchus, in fact, speaks of the Crich Comgaill, but the Annals of Ulster use the term cenél in a report of c. 710.

The Senchus says that Comgall had one son, Conall, and that Conall had seven sons, although only six are named: Loingsech, Nechtan, Artan, Tuatan, Tutio, and Coirpre. It may be that Coirpre was a later addition as the Senchus speaks of the people of Coirpre as being distinct from the sons of Erc. As with all claimed early genealogies, this need not be taken as reliable information. Unlike Cenél nGabráin and Cenél Loairn, no later genealogy traces back to the Cenél Comgaill, although one from the early 8th century survives appended to a copy of the Senchus.

== Cenél Comgaill ==
The Irish annals speak relatively rarely of the Cenél Comgaill. A recent interpretation suggests, however, that the kindred may have been important in the Gaelicisation of the Picts, as a certain Dargart mac Finguine of the Cenél Comgaill married the Pictish princess Der-Ilei, and the Pictish kings Bridei and Nechtan mac Der Ilei were the result of this marriage.

The Cenél Comgaill are thought to have been centred in Cowal, which is plausibly derived from Comgall or Comgaill, and the Isle of Bute. They may also have controlled the Isle of Arran to the south. The royal centres of their kingdom are not certainly known. Dunoon may have been important. The late 6th- or early 7th-century Saint Blane was reportedly associated with Bute, but modern scholars are less certain that his traditions are authentic. The monastery at Kingarth associated with Saint Blane is mentioned in the annals. It lies close to the Dunagoil fort, which might be a plausible royal centre, but it is not clear that this was occupied in the corresponding period.

== See also ==
- Origins of the Kingdom of Alba

Preceded by Domangart Réti	King of Dál Riata unknown	Succeeded by Gabrán mac Domangairt
