= Restenneth Priory =

Monastery in Angus, Scotland

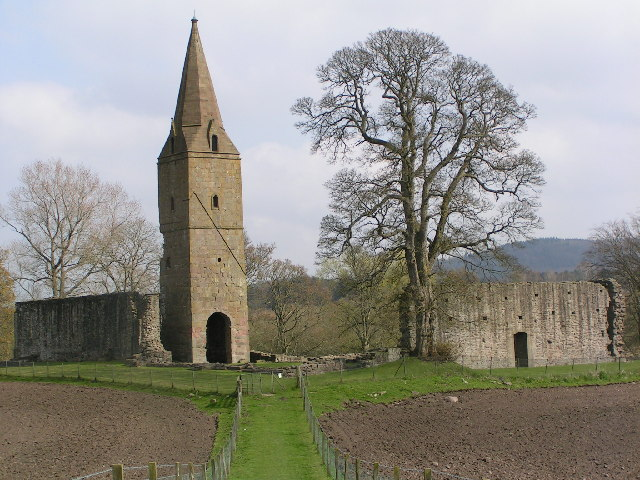
- Ruins of Restenneth Priory
- Interactive map of Restenneth Priory

Site
- Coordinates: 56.6533°N 2.8461°W

Scheduled monument
- Official name: Restenneth Priory
- Type: Ecclesiastical: priory
- Designated: 23 February 1923
- Reference no.: SM90246

Restenneth Priory was a monastic house of Augustinian canons founded by Jedburgh Abbey, with the patronage of King Malcolm IV of Scotland, in 1153. Although there is little literary evidence, archaeological evidence strongly indicates that there was a monastery at Restenneth from very early times. There is also speculation that Restenneth may even have been the Pictish church dedicated to St Peter (mentioned in Bede) built in 710 for Nechtán mac Der Ilei, King of the Picts.

Augustinian Restenneth was always a small priory and very dependent on its mother-house at Jedburgh. In 1501 there were only two canons and an annual income of £120 (compare Arbroath Abbey, which had £10,924 in 1561). There was an attempt to incorporate it into the Royal Chapel in this year, but this failed to occur, and King James IV of Scotland suggested its incorporation into the archbishopric of St Andrews. This too evidently did not occur, as priors continue to be on record. The priory was, however, turned into a secular lordship for Thomas Erskine, Viscount Fentoun, in 1606. Among the owners of Restenneth following the Reformation was George Dempster of Dunnichen (1732-1818), who chose part of the choir as a burial site for his family. Also reported to have been buried in the Priory about 1327 is John Bruce, youngest son of Robert I, King of Scots and his 2nd wife Elizabeth de Burgh, who was the twin brother of David II of Scotland.

The site was excavated in 1883 by William Galloway and Dr John Stuart.

All except the tower is now in ruins, which are a scheduled monument.

For the tourist, Restenneth Priory is just outside the medium-sized town of Forfar. It shares an access road with the Angus Archives. There is a short path from the closest parking area to the priory. While at the priory, the town and the roads nearby are not visible, so the fields and the medieval (or maybe earlier) architecture are the only things to be seen.

== Bibliography ==
- Cowan, Ian B. & Easson, David E., Medieval Religious Houses: Scotland With an Appendix on the Houses in the Isle of Man, Second Edition, (London, 1976), pp. 53, 66, 95-6
- Watt, D.E.R. & Shead, N.F. (eds.), The Heads of Religious Houses in Scotland from the 12th to the 16th Centuries, The Scottish Records Society, New Series, Volume 24, (Edinburgh, 2001), pp. 182–6

== See also ==
- Prior of Restenneth, for a list of priors and commendators
