= Cathróe of Metz =

Monk and abbot

Cathróe
- Venerated in: Roman Catholic Church; Eastern Orthodox Church
- Feast: 6 March

Saint Cathróe (circa 900–971) was a monk and abbot. His life is recorded in a hagiography written soon after his death by a monk at the monastery of Saint Felix at Metz, where Cathróe was abbot. Miracles of healing were attributed to Cathróe during his life, and he was considered a saint after his death.

As well as the information it contains on events in Lotharingia and Germany, and on attitudes of the time, Cathróe's life is of particular interest to historians for the light it sheds on southern Scotland in the 10th century.

== Origins ==
One clue to Cathróe's background, his name, has also proved to be a stumbling block. In his Life, it is commonly spelt as Cathroe, but other forms are given such as Cadroe (heading) and Kaddroe (3x), which come closer to those used later at Metz (Cadroe, Kadroe). His biographer explains it as meaning "a soldier in the Lord's camp(s)" (bellator in castris Dominis). Some scholars have proposed that what the continental monks heard and transcribed was a Brythonic, more specifically Old Cumbric name, the first element of which derives from Celtic *katu- "battle". However, following John Colgan's lead, David Dumville favours a Goidelic etymology. He points out that the personal name Cathróe is attested in Old and Middle Irish and can be explained as a compound meaning "battle-field" (Cath, cognate with Welsh cat, + róe).

Cathróe was born circa 900. Neil McGuigan suggests that he grew up in or near Dunkeld in Scotland. His father's name is given as Fochereach, a nobleman, his mother was Bania, who came from a similar background. After the birth of a brother with the Goidelic name Mattadán, Cathróe was fostered with his paternal uncle Beanus (Saint Bean; there were several Gaelic saints of this name).

== Pilgrimage ==
Bean sent his nephew to study in Ireland, at Armagh, where he seems to have learned both Latin and Greek. He returned to Scotland, to teach in his uncle's monastery. Visions persuaded Cathróe to leave Scotland as a pilgrim. The hagiographer tells us that "the king that ruled the land, Constantine by name, hastened to hold back [Cathróe]". Cathróe entered the "house of the blessed Brigit", presumed to be the monastery dedicated to Saint Brigid of Kildare at Abernethy. "A certain abbot, called Maelodair [Máel Odran]" persuaded King Constantine to allow Catroe to leave, and to help him on his journey. "Then all emulously rendered assistance with gold and silver, with raiment and horses' and they sped [Cathróe] with God's blessing; and conducted by the king himself he came to the Cumbrians' land." The writer tells us that King Dovenaldus ruled the Cumbrians, and that he was Cathróe's kinsman. The king escorted Catroe to Loidam Civitatem (read as Leeds or Carlisle), "which is the boundary between the Cumbrians and the Northmen".

In York, Cathróe was welcomed, the writer claims, by King Eric, whose wife was a relative of Cathróe's. This is problematic as Eric Bloodaxe is not thought to have ruled York at the time of the journey, and Eric's wife Gunnhild was said to be Norwegian.

== Later career ==
Cathróe was abbot of Waulsort for several years, until Adelbero, Bishop of Metz, gave him the administration of St Felix's Abbey in Metz.

== Hagiography ==
One Ousmann (or Reimann or Erimann) wrote a hagiography.
