= Der-Ilei =

Relative of king Bridei III of the Picts

Der-Ilei (born late 7th century) is believed to have been a daughter, or less probably a sister, of Bridei map Beli, king of the Picts (died 693). There are no explicit mentions of Der-Ilei in the Irish annals or other sources, and her existence and parentage are thus based on the implication of the surviving records.

Der-Ilei, the parent indicated for the brothers and successive Pictish kings Bridei son of Der-Ilei and Naiton son of Der-Ilei, is believed to have been female partly on the linguistic basis that the first element of the name Der- comes from the older element *duchtair meaning "daughter", cognate with the Gaulish word duxtir. Der-Ilei's name could linguistically be either Gaelic or Pictish.

Der-Ilei is presumed to have been married to Dargart mac Finguine (died 686), a prince of the Cenél Comgaill. Their children are thought to have included Bruide mac Der-Ilei (died 706) and Nechtan mac Der-Ilei (died 732), kings of the Picts and perhaps the Comgal mac Dargarto whose death in 712 is noticed by the Annals of Ulster. That Der-Ilei is the parent represented in the names of these Pictish kings suggests their strongest link to the Pictish throne was through her blood.

She also married a man named Drostam, the hypocoristic form of the common name Drest or Drust, with whom she had a son named Talorc or Talorcan; Talorcan, again, is a hypocoristic form. Drostan and Der-Ilei may have been the parents of Finguine, killed in 729 with his son Feroth at the battle of Monith Carno, or he may have been a son of Drostan by another marriage.

It is not clear which of these marriages produced Der-Ilei's son Ciniod (died 713).

Since Bruide, son of Dargart, was evidently an adult in 696; and Talorc, son of Drostan, does not appear in the record until 713, it is thought that Der-Ilei married Drostan following the death of Dargart.
