= Dargart mac Finguine =

Dargart mac Finguine (died 685) was a member of the Cenél Comgaill kindred, after which Cowal in Scotland is named. The only event directly connected with him in the Irish annals, based on a chronicle then being kept on Iona, is his death.

Dargart is believed to have been the father of two kings of the Picts, Bridei mac Der-Ilei and Nechtan mac Der-Ilei.

== Background ==
Dargart is a very uncommon name, and it is presumed that the few references to someone of that name in the record all refer to the same person. That a member of the Cenél Comgaill should be noticed at all by the Iona chronicle, which focussed its attention on the Cenél nGabráin of Kintyre, is most unusual. Excepting those descendants of Comgall mac Domangairt who are included in traditional lists of Kings of Dál Riata, only Dargart, and his father Finguine Fota are mentioned by the chroniclers, in both cases on the occasion of their deaths.

Dargart's father's ancestry is recorded in one surviving genealogy, the Genelaig Albanensium, appended to a version of the Senchus fer n-Alban. This makes him a great-grandson of Comgall, although a generation may have been omitted, and records another son of his, Ferchar by name.

The report of Dargart's death—by violence, the Latin word iugulatio is used—appears in the Annals of Tigernach and the Annals of Ulster in the year of the battle of Nechtansmere, that is 685, and has later been duplicated by the Annals of Ulster under the year 692.

== Descendants ==
Dargart appears to have married a woman named Der-Ilei, perhaps a daughter, or less probably a sister, of King Bridei son of Beli. They had at least two sons, the Pictish kings Bridei, who died c. 706, and Nechtan, who died in 732. Congal mac Dargarto, who died in 712, was very likely this Dargart's son, although whether with Der-Ilei is less certain. It is also uncertain whether Ciniod, or Cináed, mac Der-Ilei, killed in 713 was Dargart's son.
