= Bridei IV =

King of the Picts from 697 to 706

Bridei son of Der-Ilei

King of the Picts
- Reign: 697–706
- Predecessor: Taran
- Successor: Nechtan III
- Died: 706
- Father: Der-Ilei

Bridei son of Der-Ilei (Old Irish: Bruide mac Derilei; died 706) was king of the Picts from 697 until 706. He became king when Taran was deposed in 697.

He was the brother of his successor Nechtan. It has been suggested that Bruide's father was Dargart mac Finguine (d. 686) of the Cenél Comgaill, a kingroup in Dál Riata who controlled Cowal and the Isle of Bute. The parentage of his mother, Der-Ilei, is not certainly known.

As well as Nechtan, a number of other brothers, half-brothers, or foster-brothers of Bruide can be tentatively identified in the Irish annals: Talorgan son of Drest, Congus son of Dargart and Cináed son of Der-Ilei.

Bruide was one of many important men of Ireland and Scotland who guaranteed the Cáin Adomnáin (Lex Innocentium; Law of Innocents) at Birr in 697.

A battle between the Picts and Saxons in 698 in which Berhtred, son of Beornhaeth, was killed, is reported by the Irish chroniclers. A defeat of the Dál Riata is reported in 704, either at Loch Lomond or by the Leven, but it is more likely to have been at the hands of the Britons of Altclut than the Picts. Conflict in Skye in 701, where Conaing son of Dúnchad was killed, is most probably an internal conflict among the tribes of Dál Riata. It is reported in the Chronicon Scotorum that the winter of 700 was so cold that "the sea froze between Ireland and Scotland".

Bruide died in 706 when his death is recorded by the Annals of Ulster and the Annals of Tigernach. He was succeeded by his brother Nechtan.

Regnal titles
Preceded by Taran	King of the Picts; 697–706	Succeeded by Nechtan III
