= Nechtan mac Der-Ilei =

King of the Picts from 706 to 724 and from 728 to 729

King of the Picts
- Reign: 706–724 and 728–729
- Predecessor: Bridei IV and Alpín I of the Picts
- Successor: Drest VII and Óengus I
- Died: 732
- Father: Der-Ilei

Naiton son of Der-Ilei (Old Irish: Nechtan mac Derilei; died 732), also called Naiton son of Dargart (Old Irish: Nechtan mac Dargarto), (Note: Also recorded in different sources as Necthon, Nectan and Naitan.) was king of the Picts between 706–724 and between 728–729. He succeeded his brother Bridei IV in 706. He is associated with significant religious reforms in Pictland. He abdicated in 724 in favour of his nephew and became a monk. In 728 and 729 he fought in a four-sided war for the Pictish throne.

== Background ==
It has been argued that Nechtan son of Derile should be identified with the Nechtan son of Dargart mentioned in the Annals of Ulster in 710. Dargart is taken to be the Dargart mac Finguine who died in 686, a member of the Cenél Comgaill kindred of Dál Riata. On this basis, and because Bede mentions that the Picts allowed for matrilineal succession in exceptional cases, it is thought that Der-Ilei (Bridei III) was Nechtan's mother.

Other brothers and half-brothers of Nechtan and Bridei would include Ciniod or Cináed, killed in 713; Talorcan son of Drestan, a half-brother or foster-brother and king of Atholl, held captive by Nechtan in the same year and executed by drowning in 739, and perhaps Congas son of Dar Gart who died in 712. A number of later figures, including the Talorgan son of Congus, defeated in 731 and likewise drowned in 734, and his unnamed brother, may be associated with Nechtan's family.

Bede claimed that relations between the Picts and Northumbria were peaceful in his time. However, the Annals of Ulster for 711 report a Pictish defeat at Northumbrian hands, "in Mag Manonn", presumably in the area around Stirling where the kingdom of Manau had once been, where Finnguine son of Deile Roith was killed. Nothing more is known of Finnguine, but as he bore Nechtan's paternal grandfather's name, it may be that he was a kinsman of the Pictish king.

== Religious reforms ==
Bede's Ecclesiastical History of the English People includes a letter from Abbot Ceolfrid of the twin monasteries of Monkwearmouth and Jarrow to Nechtan on the subject of the dating of Easter, sent around 710. Ceolfrid assumes his correspondent is an educated man, going some way to justifying Thomas Owen Clancy's description of Nechtan as a philosopher king. Nechtan was convinced by Ceolfrid, and the expulsion of clergy associated with Iona in 717 may be related to the controversy over Easter and the manner of tonsures; however, it is equally likely to have been entirely unrelated. Often portrayed as a struggle between the so-called Celtic Church and Rome, it is evident that the majority of Irish clerics had long accepted the Roman method of calculating the date of Easter.

As well as providing Nechtan with guidance on the Easter controversy, Ceolfrid sent masons and craftsmen to aid in building stone churches. Bede's claim that Nechtan dedicated his kingdom to Saint Peter has led to Nechtan being linked to the Peterkirks at Rosemarkie, Duffus, Restenneth and elsewhere in north-east Scotland.

== Abdication and return ==
Two sons of Nechtan are thought to have died in 710, and it is not known whether he had any surviving sons or daughters. The Annals of Tigernach note, in 724, that Nechtan entered a monastery, leaving the throne to Drest. Although the identification must be uncertain, it is assumed that this Drest is the son of Nechtan's half-brother.

King Drest VII may not have had a secure hold on power. One Simul son of Drest, perhaps yet another sibling of Nechtan, was imprisoned by Drest in 725. In the same year, Brec of Fortriu died. He is assumed from the context to be the bishop of Fortriu, almost certainly appointed by Nechtan and the earliest known bishop in Pictland. In 726, Drest had Nechtan imprisoned. This may have involved no more than removing the former king from one monastery, where he had friends and influence, to another where Drest's partisans were in control.

In 728, Óengus son of Fergus defeated the shadowy Alpín. It seems likely that at this time, if not earlier, Nechtan had left the monastic life and was warring with Drest and Alpín. After Alpín was defeated a second time, the Annals of Tigernach say that Nechtan III was restored to the kingship. A battle between Óengus's army and Nechtan's enemies at Monith Carno (perhaps Cairn o' Mount, near Fettercairn) ended with the defeat of Nechtan's enemies, among whom are named Biceot son of Moneit, Finguine son of Drostan and Feroth son of Finguine.

After being restored to power, Nechtan reigned until 732. He was succeeded by Óengus.

== Legacy ==
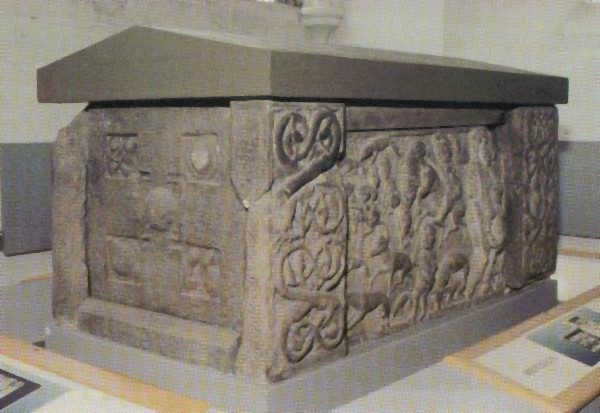
The St Andrews Sarcophagus

It has been suggested that the St Andrews Sarcophagus was commissioned by Óengus to hold Nechtan's remains, although it is more generally supposed that the sarcophagus was for Óengus himself. Nechtan's attachment to Saint Peter may have led later chroniclers, writing in a period when Saint Andrew was of far greater importance, to have emphasised ninth century kings who had supported the cult of Saint Andrew.

A number of later traditions associating earlier Pictish kings named Nechtan with the monastic foundation at Abernethy may have confused them with this Nechtan.

Nechtan's ecclesiastical reforms are seen as having led to closer links between Pictland and Northumbria, with notable results in artistic forms. His expulsion of Ionan clerics, rather than being a submission to Rome and Northumbria, probably marks the coming of age of an independent Pictish church, which nonetheless remained close to Iona and to Ireland. In addition, it speaks to a very considerable degree of royal control over the church in Pictland, which appears to have been contentious in the ninth century.

== Notes ==
Nechtan mac Der-Ilei
Regnal titles
Preceded by Bridei IV	King of the Picts; 706–724	Succeeded by Drest VII
Preceded by Alpín I of the Picts	King of the Picts; 728–729	Succeeded by Óengus I
