= Outline of the history of the British Isles =

Overview of and topical guide to the history of the British Isles

The following outline is provided as an overview of and topical guide to the history of the British Isles:

History of the British Isles – history of the European island group known as the British Isles.

== Political entities ==
Throughout history, various political entities have inhabited the British Isles, with varying degrees of power and independence over one another.

=== Existing political entities ===
- History of Ireland
- History of the United Kingdom - The United Kingdom is a union of different nations:
  - History of England
  - History of Northern Ireland
  - History of Scotland
  - History of Wales

The British Isles also includes three Crown dependencies of the United Kingdom.

- History of Guernsey
- History of Jersey
- History of the Isle of Man

=== Former political entities ===
The following political entities all at one time existed within the British Isles.

==== Anglo-Saxon kingdoms ====
Anglo-Saxons inhabited England from the 5th Century, and formed their own kingdoms.

- Kingdom of East Anglia
- Kingdom of Essex
- Kingdom of Kent
- Kingdom of Mercia
- Kingdom of Northumbria
- Kingdom of Sussex
- Kingdom of Wessex

==== Irish kingdoms ====
- List of Irish kingdoms

Prior to the Norman invasion of Ireland many Irish Kingdoms existed. Some of the larger ones were:

- Kingdom of Connacht
- Kingdom of Leinster
- Kingdom of Meath
- Kingdom of Munster
- Kingdom of Ulster

==== Kingdoms in Scotland ====
The following kingdoms all existed in what is now recognised as Scotland:

- Kingdom of Alba
- Bernicia
- Dál Riata
- Fortriu
- Kingdom of Strathclyde
- Kingdom of the Isles

==== Welsh kingdoms ====
During the medieval era several kingdoms existed in Wales.

- Brycheiniog
- Kingdom of Ceredigion
- Dogfeiling
- Dunoding
- Kingdom of Dyfed
- Glywysing
- Kingdom of Gwent
- Kingdom of Gwynedd
- Meirionnydd
- Pengwern
- Kingdom of Powys
- Rhos (North Wales)

==== Modern period ====
During the modern period the following entities have all existed, but no longer do so.

- Kingdom of England
- Kingdom of Ireland
- Kingdom of Scotland
- Confederate Ireland
- Commonwealth of England
- United Kingdom of Great Britain and Ireland

== Time periods ==
=== Prehistoric ===
- Prehistoric Britain
- Prehistoric Ireland
- Neolithic British Isles

=== Classical period ===
The history of the British Isles in the classical era was characterised by the attempts of the Roman Empire to conquer the islands.

- Roman Britain
- Scotland during the Roman Empire
- Wales in the Roman era

=== Medieval period ===
- England in the Middle Ages
- History of Ireland (800–1169)
- History of Ireland (1169–1536)
- Scotland in the Middle Ages
- Wales in the Middle Ages

=== Early modern period ===
- Early modern Britain
- History of Ireland (1536–1691)
- History of Ireland (1691–1800)

=== 19th Century ===
- United Kingdom of Great Britain and Ireland - State as it existed from 1801 to 1922.
  - Georgian era
  - Regency era
  - Victorian era

=== 20th Century to present ===
- History of the Republic of Ireland
- History of the United Kingdom

== Major events ==
Throughout history, there have been several events that had a lasting impact on the British Isles as a whole.

=== Conflicts ===
==== Conflicts within the British Isles ====
Historically, there have been many conflicts between the people inhabiting the British Isles which led to a lasting impact on the history of the islands.

- Wars of Scottish Independence - A series of conflicts between Scotland and England from 1296 to 1357.
- Wars of the Three Kingdoms - A series of interconnected conflicts within the British Isles from 1639 to 1653.
- Jacobite risings - A series of conflicts over the succession of the British throne from 1689 to 1745.
- Irish War of Independence - A conflict fought between the Irish Republican Army and British forces over the independence of Ireland.

==== Invasions from outside the British Isles ====
There have been several invasions of the British Isles by outside entities, some of which had a lasting impact on the history of the islands.

- Roman conquest of Britain - Roman invasion of Britain starting in 43 AD and largely completed by 87 AD.
- Norman conquest of England - 1066.
- German occupation of the Channel Islands - Occupation of Jersey and Guernsey by German forces from 1940 to 1945.

=== Political events ===
The following events had a lasting impact on the political shape of the British Isles.

- Union of the Crowns - Led to the union of England and Scotland in 1603.
- Acts of Union 1707 - Formed the Parliament of Great Britain by merging the Parliament of Scotland with the Parliament of England.
- Acts of Union 1800 - Formed the Parliament of the United Kingdom by merging the Parliament of Ireland into the Parliament of Great Britain.
- Anglo-Irish Treaty - Formally created the Irish Free State as an independent dominion of the British Empire.

== Persons influential in the history of the British Isles ==
=== National leaders ===
==== Monarchs ====
- List of English monarchs - List of English monarchs before the Acts of Union 1707.
- List of Scottish monarchs - List of Scottish monarchs before the Acts of Union 1707.
- List of British monarchs - List of British monarchs following the Acts of Union 1707.

==== Elected leaders ====
- List of presidents of Ireland
- List of prime ministers of the United Kingdom

== Timeline ==
The following is a timeline showing the major nations within the British Isles, or which controlled parts of the islands, over time.

Date	States/Peoples										Relevant events
pre-6th c. BC	Prehistoric Britain, Prehistoric Ireland
6th–1st c. BC	British Iron Age, Iron Age tribes in Britain, Insular Celtic
6th–1st c. BC	Gauls		Brythons				Picts	Gaels
51 BC	Gallia Lugdunensis (Roman province)
43 AD	Gallia Lugdunensis (Roman province)		Britannia (Roman province)								Roman conquest of Britain
410	Brythons			Anglo-Saxon England	Hen Ogledd
638	Brythons			Anglo-Saxon England		Kingdom of Strathclyde					Viking raids
843	Brythons			Anglo-Saxon England		Kingdom of Strathclyde
845	Kingdom of Brittany			Anglo-Saxon England		Kingdom of Strathclyde
878	Kingdom of Brittany			Anglo-Saxon England	Danelaw	Kingdom of Strathclyde
911	Duchy of Normandy			Anglo-Saxon England	Danelaw	Kingdom of Strathclyde
927	Duchy of Normandy			Kingdom of England		Kingdom of Strathclyde
1054	Duchy of Normandy			Kingdom of England		Kingdom of Alba					Norman conquest of England
1079	Duchy of Normandy			Kingdom of England		Kingdom of Alba		Kingdom of Mann and the Isles
1098	Duchy of Normandy		Cymru	Kingdom of England			Kingdom of Norway	Kingdom of Mann and the Isles			Anglo-Norman invasion of Ireland
1171	Duchy of Normandy		Cymru	Kingdom of England			Kingdom of Norway	Kingdom of Mann and the Isles	Lordship of Ireland
1204			Cymru	Kingdom of England			Kingdom of Norway	Kingdom of Mann and the Isles	Lordship of Ireland		Magna Carta; Treaty of York
1266			Cymru	Kingdom of England			Kingdom of Norway		Lordship of Ireland
1282							Kingdom of Norway		Lordship of Ireland		Wars of Scottish Independence
1333	Bailiwick of Guernsey	Bailiwick of Jersey	Isle of Man				Kingdom of Norway		Lordship of Ireland
1469	Bailiwick of Guernsey	Bailiwick of Jersey	Isle of Man			Kingdom of Scotland			Lordship of Ireland		Poynings' Law
1541	Bailiwick of Guernsey	Bailiwick of Jersey	Isle of Man			Kingdom of Scotland					Scottish Reformation; Tudor conquest of Ireland; Union of the Crowns
1607	Bailiwick of Guernsey	Bailiwick of Jersey	Isle of Man			Kingdom of Scotland			Kingdom of Ireland		Flight of the Earls; Plantation of Ulster; Wars of the Three Kingdoms
1641	Bailiwick of Guernsey	Bailiwick of Jersey	Isle of Man			Kingdom of Scotland				Confederate Ireland
1649	Bailiwick of Guernsey	Bailiwick of Jersey	Isle of Man	Commonwealth of England		Kingdom of Scotland				Confederate Ireland	Cromwellian conquest of Ireland
1653	Bailiwick of Guernsey	Bailiwick of Jersey	Isle of Man	Commonwealth of England, Scotland and Ireland
1660	Bailiwick of Guernsey	Bailiwick of Jersey	Isle of Man	Kingdom of England		Kingdom of Scotland			Kingdom of Ireland		Penal Laws; Revolution of 1688; Battle of the Boyne
1707	Bailiwick of Guernsey	Bailiwick of Jersey	Isle of Man	Kingdom of Great Britain					Kingdom of Ireland		Acts of Union 1707; Battle of Culloden; Irish Rebellion of 1798
1801	Bailiwick of Guernsey	Bailiwick of Jersey	Isle of Man	United Kingdom of Great Britain and Ireland							Acts of Union 1800; Catholic emancipation Great Famine of Ireland
1919	Bailiwick of Guernsey	Bailiwick of Jersey	Isle of Man	United Kingdom of Great Britain and Ireland						Irish Republic	Irish War of Independence; Partition of Ireland
1921/1922	Bailiwick of Guernsey	Bailiwick of Jersey	Isle of Man	United Kingdom of Great Britain and Northern Ireland					(Northern Ireland)	Irish Free State
1937	Bailiwick of Guernsey	Bailiwick of Jersey	Isle of Man	United Kingdom of Great Britain and Northern Ireland					(Northern Ireland)	Ireland	The Emergency; Battle of Britain; The Troubles; Celtic Tiger
1999	Bailiwick of Guernsey	Bailiwick of Jersey	Isle of Man	(Wales)	(England)	(Scotland)			(Northern Ireland)	Ireland	Devolution; Good Friday Agreement

== Miscellaneous ==
- Early music of the British Isles
- Genetic history of the British Isles

== See also ==
- Outline of the Republic of Ireland
- Outline of the United Kingdom
