= Invasions of the British Isles =

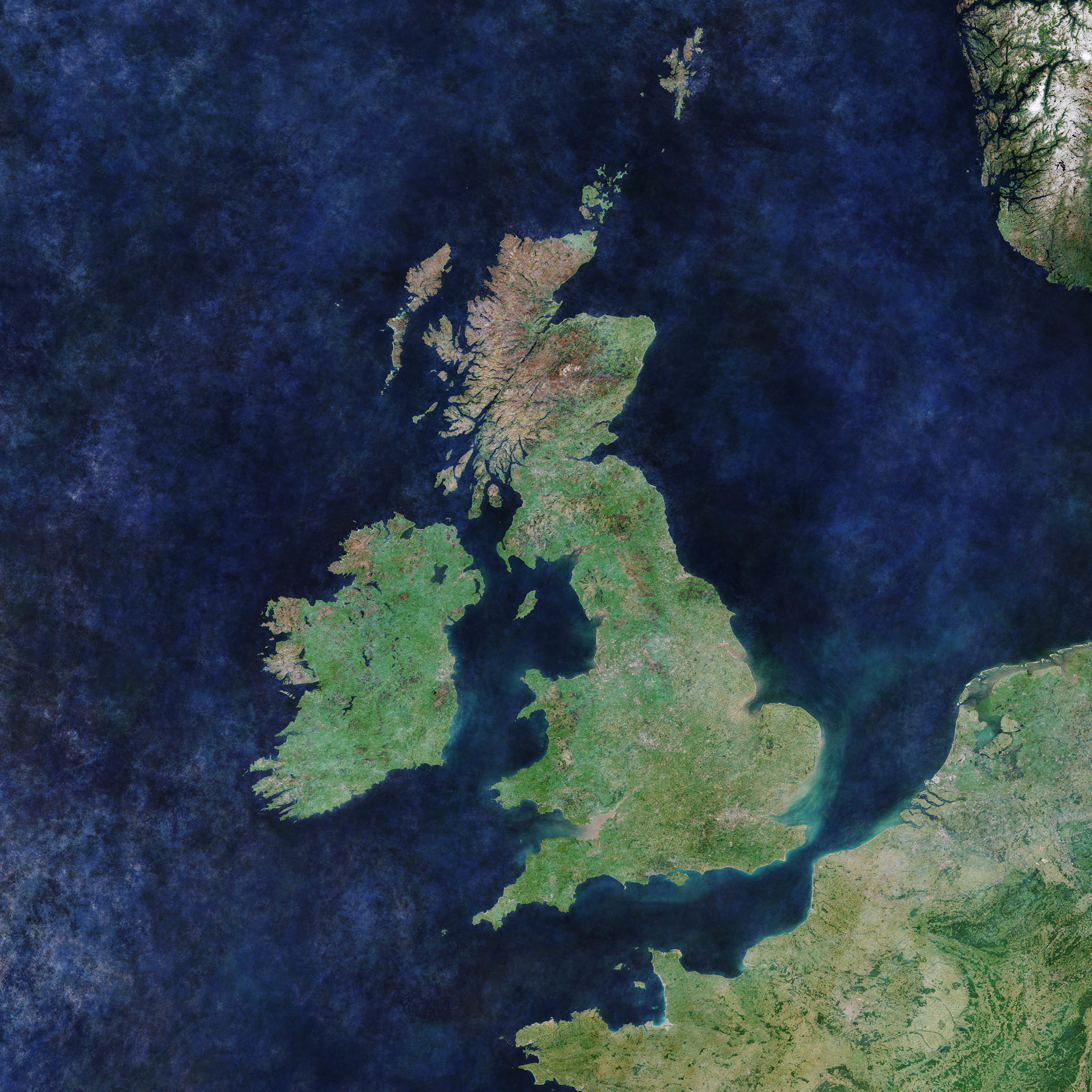
The British Isles and its surroundings

Invasions of the British Isles have occurred several times throughout their history. The British Isles have been subject to several waves of invasion and settlement since humans began inhabiting the region approximately 900,000 years ago during the Paleolithic. Notable invasions of the British Isles including Julius Caesar's invasions of Britain, the Roman conquest of Britain, Viking expansion, the Norman Conquest, the Anglo-Norman invasion of Ireland and the Dutch invasion of 1688.

== Prehistory and antiquity ==
=== Neolithic transition ===
By around 12,000 BC, during the Mesolithic, Western Hunter Gatherers had started to repopulate Britain at the end of the Younger Dryas. A study by Brace et al. (2019) found evidence of a substantial replacement of this population ca. 4,000 BC, with the introduction of agriculture by Early European Farmers from continental Europe. According to the authors, "the transition to farming in Britain occurred with little introgression from resident foragers – either during initial colonization or throughout the Neolithic." This scenario has been questioned by British archaeologist Julian Thomas, who proposes a two-stage model of Neolithization, with the later second stage resulting in a more significant population transfer than the first.

=== Arrival of Bell beaker culture ===
Starting around 2400 BC, the Bell Beaker complex arrived in Britain, probably from the lower Rhine, an archaeological culture characterised by a new bell-shaped pottery style, and grave goods that included copper daggers and items associated with metallurgy and archery. The spread of this complex introduced high levels of Yamnaya-related ancestry from the Pontic-Caspian steppe into Britain, resulting in the "replacement of approximately 90% of Britain's gene pool within a few hundred years".

An earlier study by Cassidy et al. (2015) notes a "great wave of change" at the end of the Neolithic in Ireland, including the introduction of copper mines, metallurgy, tool and weapon production, and distinctive Food Vessel pottery. Their genetic study found that three Bronze Age individuals from Rathlin Island ca. 2026–1534 BC (calibrated) also carried significant levels of Yamnaya-related ancestry, in contrast to the preceding Neolithic population, suggesting a population turnover which the authors propose "invites the possibility of accompanying introduction of Indo-European, perhaps early Celtic, language."

=== Celtic antiquity ===
Before the Romans came to Britain, and with them the advent of written records of the region, the majority of Britain was Celtic. How and when these peoples arrived in the British Isles is a matter of much conjecture; see Celtic settlement of Great Britain and Ireland for more details. The 11th-century Lebor Gabála Érenn describes successive invasions and settlements of Ireland by a variety of Celtic and pre-Celtic peoples; how much of it is based on historical fact is debated.

=== Roman invasions ===
In 55 BC, Celtic Britain was invaded by the Romans under Julius Caesar. Caesar's two invasions did not conquer Britain but established it as a major trading partner of Rome.

A century later, a botched attempt to conquer Britain was made under the emperor Caligula. Caligula's uncle and successor, Claudius, was the first emperor to oversee a successful invasion. He used as an excuse the pleas for help that came from the Atrebates, Celtic allies of Rome, and landed an army near present-day Richborough. The initial landings were unopposed, and the Celts delayed in responding to the invasion. When, under their leaders Caratacus and Togodumnus, they did, they were too late and were defeated in several battles, most notably that of the River Medway.

Claudius arrived himself, bringing up to 38 war elephants with him. When the Celts were finally defeated and Caratacus forced to flee to Wales, Claudius returned to Rome.

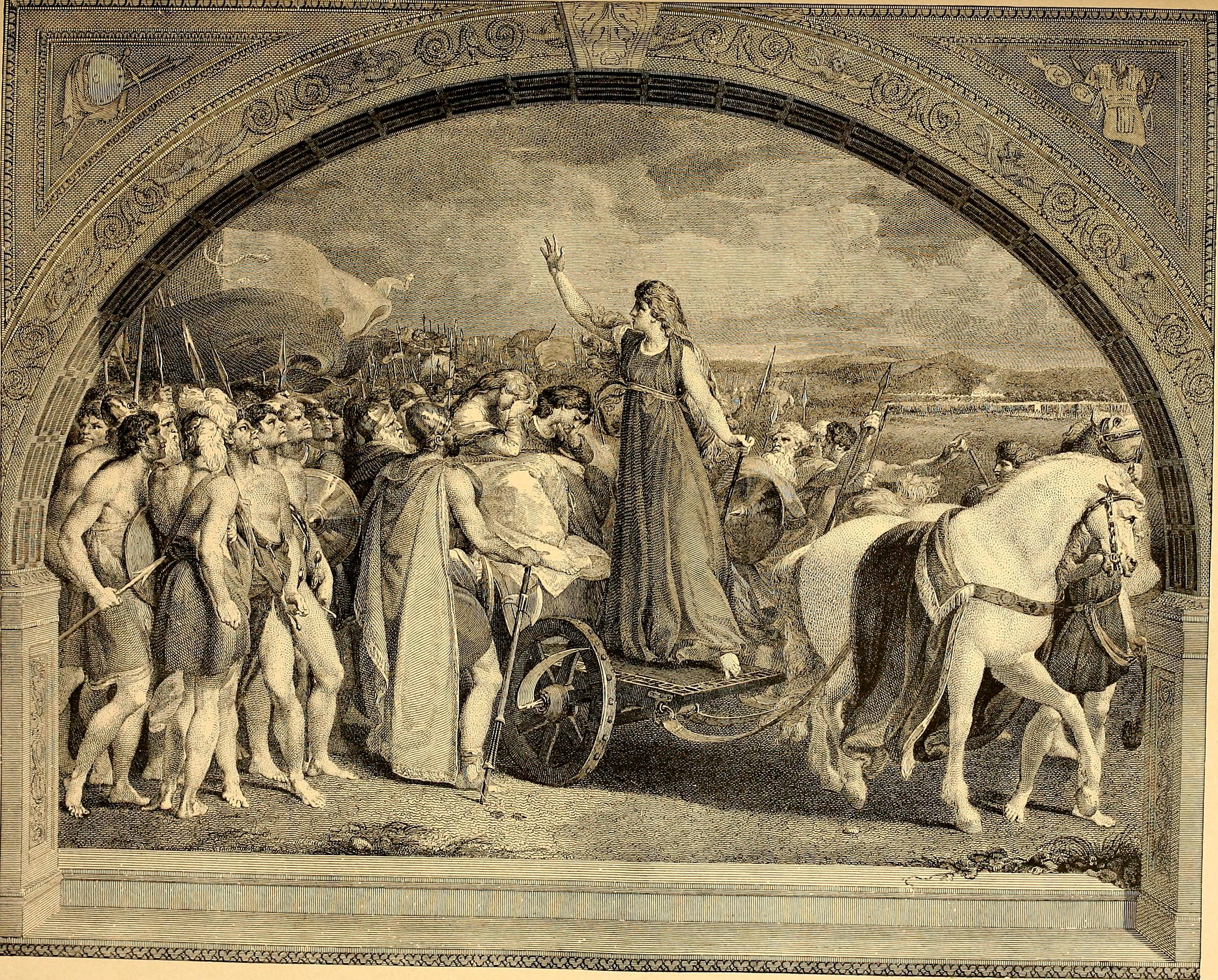
Boudicca, Queen of the Iceni in her war chariot. She headed a great revolt against the Romans but was defeated in AD 62.

In the early AD 60s, the Celtic tribal queen Boudicca led a bloody revolt against Roman rule. While the governor Gaius Suetonius Paulinus was pursuing a campaign on the isle of Anglesey, Boudicca, angered by maltreatment at the hands of the Romans, urged her people to rise up. They did, and marched on Camulodonum (now Colchester), where many former Roman soldiers had settled.

The Romans in Camulodonum were massacred after a brief fight. Meanwhile, the Legio IX Hispana (Ninth Legion) had been sent south from Lindum (now Lincoln) to put down the revolt. It failed to arrive in time, and, when it encountered the Celts, was annihilated. The battle, however, may have enabled Governor Suetonius to arrive in Londinium (London) with a small Roman army. Despite the pleas of the civil officials, Suetonius marched out of the city with his troops, knowing that any stand would be disastrous. Boudicca sacked London and pushed on to Verulamium (now St. Albans), which was also razed. Suetonius had gathered a large enough army, however, to do battle on the Roman road Watling Street. Boudicca was defeated, and Roman rule was restored to Britain.

In Sub-Roman Britain, the Scoti of Ireland raided and colonized the western Scottish and Welsh coastlines. Welsh legend holds that Gwynedd was established by Cunedda Wledig and his family, who invaded from the Old North, variously understood as Pictland or the Romanized tribes around York or Hadrian's Wall.

=== Germanic invasions ===
As the Roman Empire declined, its hold on Britain loosened. By AD 410, Roman forces had been withdrawn, and small, isolated bands of migrating Germanic peoples began to invade Britain. This was not a concerted invasion under a single leader, and there is a debate over how extensive the Germanic migration into England was. However, the tribes, notably the Jutes, Angles, and Saxons, quickly established control over modern-day England.

The peoples now called the 'Anglo-Saxons' largely came from Jutland and northern Germany, first landing in Eastern Britain. There are few records existing that account this migration, and those that were written come mainly from the Mediterranean area or were created long after the event. There were a small number of Anglo-Saxons already living in Britain before the Roman withdrawal in AD 408. The majority of these served in the army and helped the Romans fight Saxon pirates who raided the southern and eastern coasts of Britain from the 3rd century onwards. Following the collapse of Roman rule, the British rulers seemed to have hired the Saxons as mercenaries to counter the threat of invasions from the Picts in the first half of the fifth century. The Picts became less of a threat, but the mercenaries stayed and, realising their strength, rebelled. This encouraged the sea borne migration that subsequently followed and continued into the 6th century.

== Invasions of England (793–1285) ==
List of external invasions of England
Invader	Years	Source	Target	Successful?
The Great Heathen Army	865-878	Scandinavia	The Anglo-Saxon Kingdoms	x
Olaf Guthfrithson	939	Kingdom of Dublin	The Kingdom of Northumbria	✓
Eric Bloodaxe	947-954	Norway	The Kingdom of England	x
Sven Forkbeard	1013-1014	Denmark	The Kingdom of England	✓
Cnut	1015-1016	Denmark	The Kingdom of England	✓
Harald Hardrada of Norway	1066	Norway	The Kingdom of England	x
William the Conqueror	1066	Duchy of Normandy	The Kingdom of England	✓
Danes under Sweyn II	1069-1070	Denmark	The Kingdom of England	x
Henry Beauclerc, later Henry II of England	1153	County of Anjou	The Kingdom of England	✓
Prince Louis of France, later Louis VIII	1215-1217	Kingdom of France	The Kingdom of England	x He was proclaimed King Louis I of England at Old St Paul's Cathedral but never crowned.

=== Viking raids and invasions ===
Viking raids began in England in the late 8th century, primarily on monasteries. The first monastery to be raided was in 793 at Lindisfarne, off the northeast coast, and the first recorded raid being at Portland, Dorset in 789; the Anglo-Saxon Chronicle described the Vikings as heathen men. Monasteries and minster churches were popular targets as they were wealthy and had valuable objects that were portable. The Anglo-Saxon Chronicle for the year 840 says that Æthelwulf of Wessex was defeated at Carhampton, Somerset, after 35 Viking ships had landed in the area.

According to Norse Sagas, in 865 the legendary Viking chief Ragnar Lodbrok fell into the hands of King Ælla of Northumbria. Ælla allegedly had Ragnar thrown into a snake pit. It is said that Ragnar's enraged sons, taking advantage of political instability in England, recruited the Great Heathen Army, which landed in the Kingdom of East Anglia that year. There is no proof that this legend has any basis in history; however, it is known that several of the Viking leaders grouped their bands together to form one great army that landed in the kingdom of East Anglia to start their attempted conquest of England in 866.

In 867 the great army went north and captured York, but Ælla, together with support from the other English kingdoms, attempted to retake the city. He was unsuccessful; the annals for the year says that Ælla was killed during the battle, but according to legend he was captured by the Vikings, who executed or 'blood eagled' him as punishment for Ragnar's murder.

By the late 9th century, the Vikings had overrun most of the Anglo-Saxon kingdoms that constituted England at the time. However, Alfred the Great, king of Wessex, defeated the Vikings at the Battle of Edington in 878. The resultant treaty gave the Danes control of northern and eastern England, with Alfred and his successors controlling Wessex. But the whole of England was unified with Norway and Denmark in the eleventh century, during the reign of the Danish king Cnut the Great.

When Cnut died, however, he was succeeded by the Anglo-Saxon king Edward the Confessor. Edward managed to reign until his death in 1066, when he was succeeded by the powerful Earl of Wessex, Harold Godwinson. Harold's accession, however, was not unanimously embraced. To the north, the Norwegian king Harald Hardrada invaded England. In the late summer of 1066, the invaders sailed up the Ouse before advancing on York. Outside the city they defeated a northern English army led by Edwin, Earl of Mercia and his brother Morcar, Earl of Northumbria at the Battle of Fulford on 20 September. On hearing of the northern army's defeat Harold Godwinson marched the southern army north and met and defeated Hardrada at Stamford Bridge.

While Godwinson was busy up north, William the Bastard (later to be known as William the Conqueror), landed his army in Sussex, intent on seizing the throne of England.

=== Norman conquest of England ===
Harold Godwinson was shipwrecked at Ponthieu in 1064 and taken captive by Guy I (or Wido according to the Bayeux Tapestry), the Count of Ponthieu. It is alleged that William (Duke of Normandy), discovering that Harold had been taken captive, sent messengers ordering Count Guy to hand over his prisoner. William persuaded Harold to support William's claim to the throne of England. Harold was forced to swear an oath of support for William. After the ceremony it was revealed that the box on which Harold had made his oath contained holy relics, making the promise especially binding.

When Harold was crowned king of England, William was angered by Harold's accession, and set about gathering an invasion army. William, having gathered together an army and a fleet to transport it, landed in Pevensey Bay in the late summer of 1066. Harold, having just defeated Hardrada in the north, marched his troops back south, where, exhausted, they encountered William near Hastings.

During the battle that followed, William's forces suffered heavy casualties but managed to rout Harold's infantry. However, Harold and his housecarls stood firm, despite a torrent of arrows shot at them by William's archers. Soon after Harold was hit by an arrow and killed, the housecarls were overwhelmed by William's victorious soldiers. William was crowned in London by the Archbishop of York, then set about restructuring the English government and imposing the feudal system on the nobility.

==== The Danish invasion of 1069–70 ====
William's rule was not yet secure and a number of revolts against the Normans took place, notably in the North of England and East Anglia. A large Danish army arrived in England in 1069 to support an uprising in the North. In the winter of the same year William marched his army from Nottingham to York with the intention of engaging the rebel army. However, by the time William's army had reached York the rebel army had fled. As the Danes had nowhere suitable to stay for the winter, on land, they decided to go back to their ships in the Humber Estuary. They were reinforced in 1070 by a fleet from Denmark and sailed en-masse to East Anglia where they raided the area. However, William met with the Danish army and it was agreed that if he made payment to them then they would go home to Denmark, without a fight.

Rebellions continued to occur in various parts of the country. William sent earls to deal with problems in Dorset, Shrewsbury and Devon while he dealt with rebels in the Midlands and Stafford.

=== Anglo-Saxon alliance with the Scots (1070–1072) ===
Edgar Ætheling, the last remaining male member of the House of Wessex, fled to Scotland, in 1068, seeking protection from their king, Malcolm III. Edgar sought Malcolm's assistance in his struggle against William. Malcolm married the Ætheling's sister, Margaret, in 1071. The marriage of Malcolm to Edgar's sister profoundly affected the history of both England and Scotland. The influence of Margaret and her sons brought about the anglicization of the Lowlands and also provided the Scottish king with an excuse for forays into England which he could claim were to redress the wrongs against his brother-in-law.

The formal link between the royal house of Scotland and Wessex was an obvious threat to William, who marched north towards Scotland in 1072 to confront the Scottish king. The two kings negotiated the Treaty of Abernethy (1072), where Malcolm became William's vassal, and one of the conditions of the agreement was the expulsion of Edgar Ætheling from the Scottish court.

=== First Barons' War (1215–1217) ===
When King Richard I of England was mortally wounded during fighting against the French in 1199, his brother John succeeded him. John continued the war against King Philip II of France, whose forces overran much of the English territory in France, including Normandy.

After John's second attempt to invade France failed, his nobles forced him to agree to Magna Carta in 1215. However, the king disregarded the charter's contents, and the barons rose up against him and appealed to the heir to the French throne, the future Louis VIII, to replace John as king.

The first French troops arrived in November 1215, with 240 knights and a similar number of infantry following in January 1216. In May 1216 Louis himself arrived with his army and moved quickly to capture London. There was little resistance when the prince entered London and at St Paul's Cathedral, Louis was proclaimed King with great pomp and celebration in the presence of all of London. Even though he was not crowned, many nobles, as well as King Alexander II of Scotland (1214–1249), gathered to give homage.

The French took a number of castles in Southern England including Winchester in June, Chichester and Reigate Castles, and began a major siege of Dover Castle. John died in October and was succeeded by his son, Henry III. Soon after Louis' support began to wane as barons who had grievances with John took the opportunity to make peace with the new king. The French abandoned the siege of Dover Castle in November but the campaign continued in the south-east. In early 1217, the focus shifted northwards, culminating in a major French defeat at the Battle of Lincoln in May. The defense of England was led by Sir William Marshal, who was also one of King Henry III's regents. In August, a fleet carrying French reinforcements was defeated off Sandwich. Louis realised that the cause was lost and in September 1217 signed the Treaty of Kingston, leaving the country later that month.

The war, and the invasion, left England with few territories in France but with the Norman Plantagenet dynasty still on the throne.

== Invasions of Wales (1067–1284) ==
Shortly after their conquest of England in 1066, the Normans invaded Wales. Although, the Welsh reversed much of the Normans' initial advance, the Marcher lords continued to occupy significant parts of the country.

By the 13th century the Welsh principality of Gwynedd posed a significant threat both to the Marcher lords and to the King of England. Llywelyn ap Gruffudd, prince of Gwynedd, secured the recognition of the title Prince of Wales from Henry III with the Treaty of Montgomery in 1267. Later however, a succession of disputes, including the imprisonment of Llywelyn's wife Eleanor, daughter of Simon de Montfort, culminated in the first invasion by Edward I.

As a result of military defeat, the Treaty of Aberconwy exacted Llywelyn's fealty to England in 1277. Peace was short lived and, with the completion in 1282 of the Edwardian conquest, the rule of the Welsh princes permanently ended. With Llywelyn's death and his brother prince Dafydd's execution, the few remaining Welsh lords did homage for their lands to Edward I.

== Invasions of England and Wales (1284–1797) ==
=== Scottish Wars ===
Anglo-Scottish relations were generally poor throughout the Late Middle Ages. Edward I's attempts to become feudal overlord of Scotland after the death of Alexander III in 1286 led to a long struggle for Scottish independence. Significantly, in 1295 it led to a long running alliance with France, later known as the Auld alliance. Warfare between the English and the French would therefore provide a strategic context of many of the major Scottish invasions of England, in particular in 1346, 1385 and 1513. French troops were also involved in the Scottish invasion of England in 1464 on the side of the Lancastrians, during the Wars of the Roses.

==== The Franco-Scottish invasion of 1385 ====
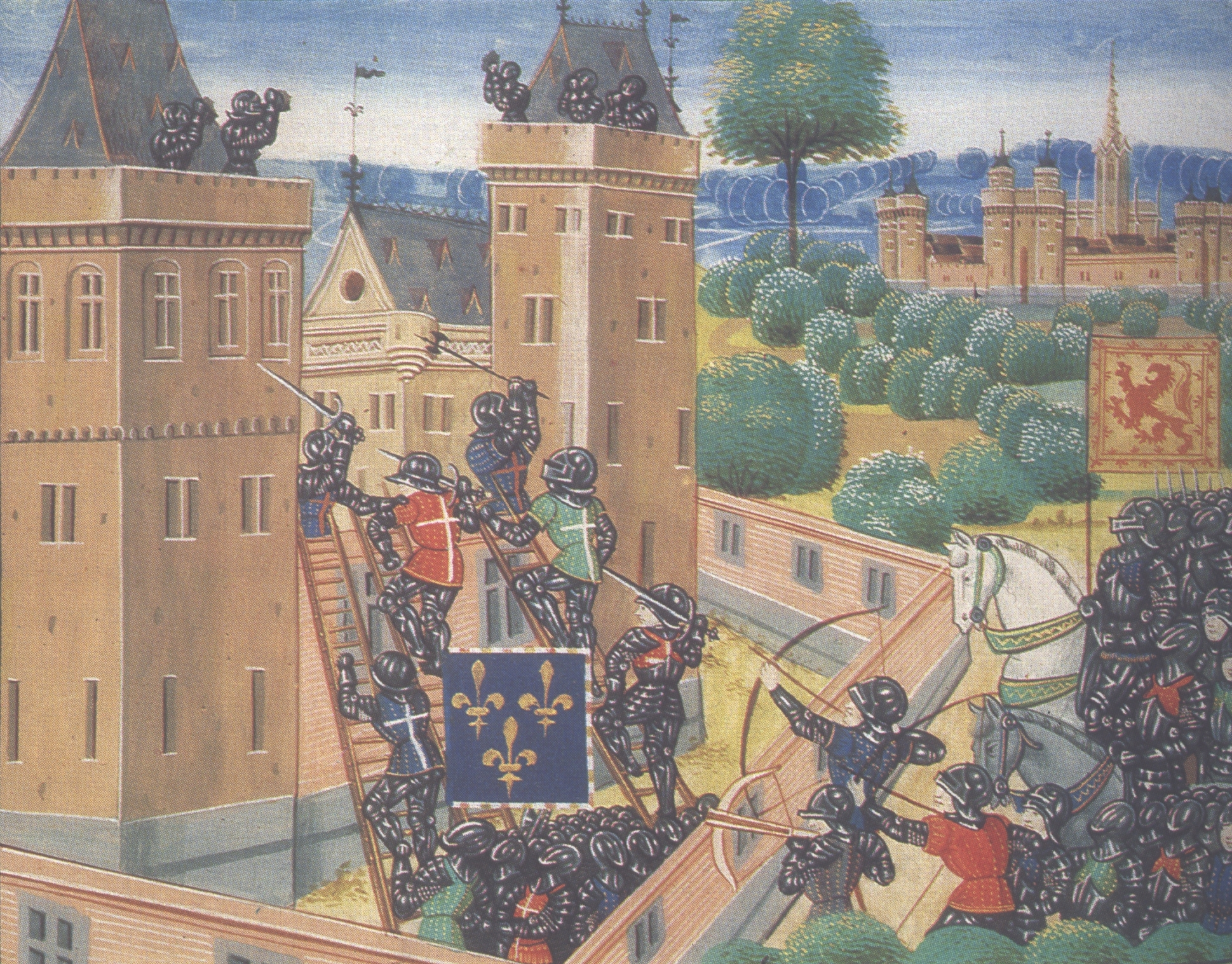
A Franco-Scottish force attacks Wark, from an edition of Froissart's Chronicles

In May 1385, a French force led by admiral Jean de Vienne sailed from Sluys to Leith in Scotland. It consisted of at least 1,000 men-at-arms plus servants and crossbowmen, and carried 50,000 gold francs as gifts for the Scots nobility A joint attack on the North of England was planned but there was considerable disharmony between the Scots and French contingents. Eventually a joint force invaded England in July and succeeded in taking the castle at Wark. However, an English relief army was approaching and the Franco-Scottish force fell back before them to Edinburgh, which was burned by the English on 11 August. Admiral de Vienne led his men on a counterattack on the English West March, launching an assault on Carlisle on 7 September. The assault failed and the French force fell back into Scotland harried by English forces. De Vienne returned to Edinburgh hoping to over winter but morale among his army was failing and many determined to return home to France, despite the lateness of the season.

==== The Flodden Campaign 1513 ====
In 1508, a warden of the Scottish East March was murdered by an English Northumbrian. Taking advantage of the political crisis caused by this incident, the French king, whose nation was at war with the English king, Henry VIII, convinced James IV of Scotland to invade his southern neighbour.

Since King Henry was in France campaigning, Queen Catherine of Aragon organized an English army and placed it under the command of the elderly Earl of Surrey. The army marched north and met James' forces at Flodden. James surprised the English by leading his centre in a wild charge against Surrey's, but the English stood fast and repulsed the Scots, unhorsing and killing James. The battle ended in an English victory.

=== The Hundred Years' War ===
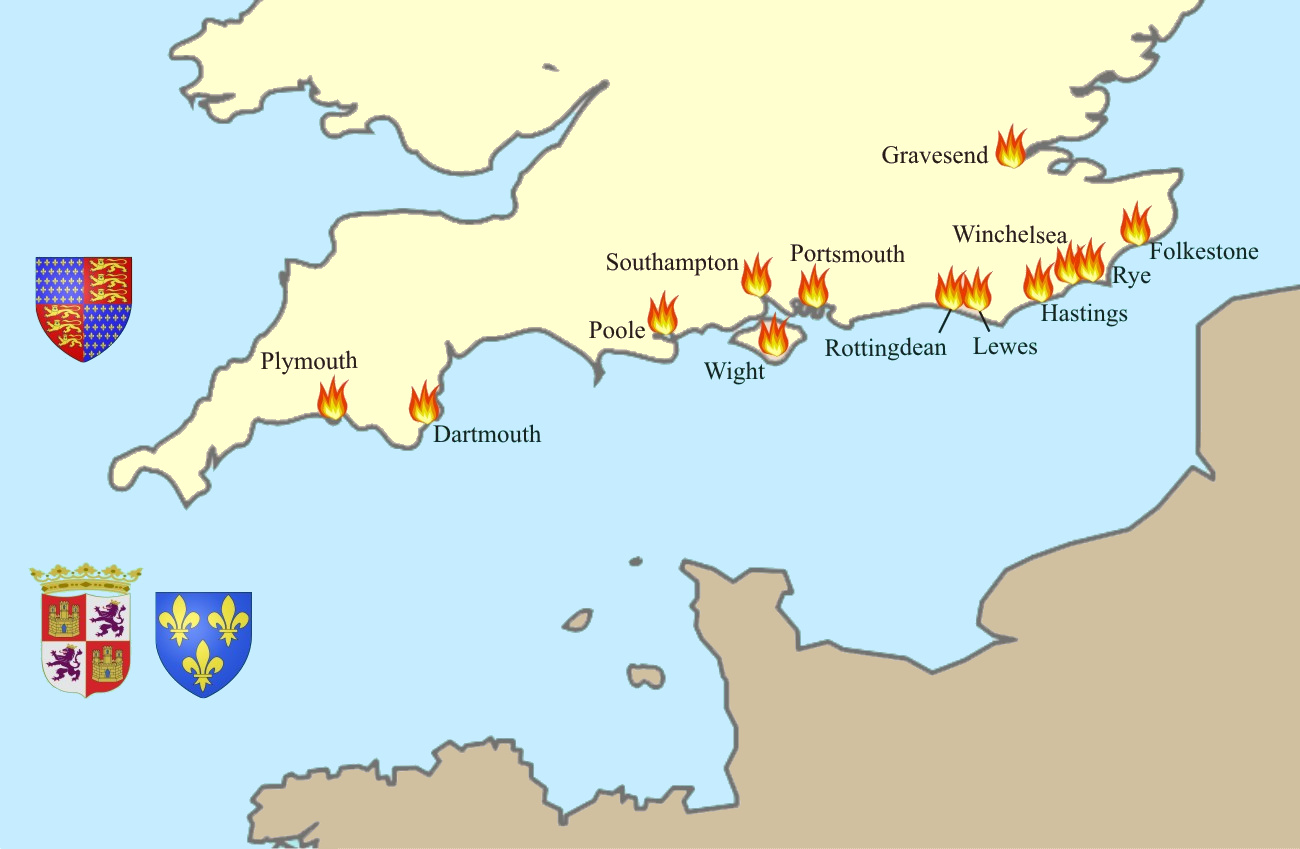
Franco-Castilian raids on the English coast 1374–80

==== French and Castilian raids ====
There were numerous French and Castilian raids on the English coast during the Hundred Years' War, particularly during the period 1374–1380. Few of these had the scale, or purpose, of invasions. Perhaps the closest was the overrunning of the Isle of Wight by a French fleet commanded by Jean de Vienne in August 1377. However, Jean de Vienne joined forces with Castilian Admiral Fernando Sánchez de Tovar and both armies conducted serious ground operations in Kent and Sussex, plundering Rye, defeating Sussex's levies led by the Earl of Arundel at Lewes, and eventually sacking and burning Hastings and Gravesend.

==== French invasions of the Channel Islands ====
In March 1338, a French force landed in Jersey, intent on capturing the island. Although the island was overrun, the main fortification in the island, Gorey Castle, remained in English hands. The French remained until September, when they sailed off to conquer Guernsey, Alderney and Sark. In 1339 the French returned, allegedly with 8,000 men in 17 Genoese galleys and 35 French ships. Again they failed to take the castle and, after causing damage, withdrew. The English were able to recapture Guernsey in October 1340 but the French held out in Castle Cornet until 1345.

In July 1373, Bertrand du Guesclin overran Jersey and besieged Mont Orgueil. His troops succeeded in breaching the outer defences, forcing the garrison back to the keep. The garrison came to an agreement that they would surrender if not relieved by Michaelmas and du Guesclin sailed back to Brittany, leaving a small force to carry on the siege. Fortunately for the defenders, an English relief fleet arrived in time.

The French did not succeed in capturing Jersey during the Hundred Years' War, but did capture Mont Orgueil in the summer of 1461, allegedly as part of a secret deal between Margaret of Anjou and Pierre de Brézé to gain French support for the Lancastrian cause. The island was held by the French until 1468, when Yorkist forces and local militia were able to recapture the castle.

==== The invasion threat of 1386 ====
From December 1385, Charles VI of France began to prepare for an invasion of England, assembling ships in the Low Countries and Brittany. Preparations continued all through the spring and summer of 1386, with the assembly of large quantities of stores, equipment and men. Amongst the stores assembled was a large prefabricated wooden fort, 3,000 paces long, with walls 20 ft (6m) high. The English responded by raising forces of men-at-arms and archers, who were stationed on the coast from the Humber to Cornwall. Originally intending to attack in August, Charles put back the date to October, and early in the month joined his fleet in Flanders. However, he was persuaded by his admiral, the Duke of Berry, to postpone the attack to the following year. A smaller-scale expedition was planned for the summer of 1387 but it came to nothing.

==== The French Invasion of 1405 ====
In July 1404, Owain Glyndŵr signed a treaty with the French by which they recognised him as Prince of Wales. This led to a French expeditionary force landing in South Wales in February 1405 to support Glyndŵr's forces. In August these were reinforced by a further expedition of 2,500 men. The combined army campaigned in Pembrokeshire, destroying Haverfordwest and capturing Carmarthen. According to the French historian Monstrelet, they then invaded England and for eight days faced the English army of Henry IV at Woodbury Hill. No battle however occurred and the Franco-Welsh force returned to Wales. Although some of the French returned home in November, most overwintered. Attempts were made to bring French reinforcements in 1406 but these were intercepted by the English fleet. The remaining French troops were withdrawn sometime during the year.

=== The overthrow of Richard II, 1399 ===
In October 1398, Henry Bolingbroke was exiled for ten years by Richard II. In February 1399, Henry's father, John of Gaunt, died, and in March 1399, Richard declared that Henry's inheritance was forfeit and that he was a traitor, permanently banished from the realm. Then, in what was to prove a major strategic error, Richard proceeded with his army to Ireland. This gave Henry the opportunity to return to England and, on 4 July 1399, he landed with a small force at Ravenspur. From there, he marched into the Lancastrian heartlands of Yorkshire, building his forces. At Bridlington, he was joined by the Earl of Northumberland and his son Henry Percy. The army marched southwards and on 20 July reached Leicester. Meanwhile, Richard's regent, Edmund, Duke of York had raised an army and was in Hertfordshire. The Duke of York had little desire to fight, however, and detaching himself from the army, met Henry at Berkeley Castle on 27 July. Henry then marched his army to Bristol, where Richard's major supporters had gathered to await his return from Ireland. The castle rapidly surrendered and Richard's chief counselors were promptly executed.

In the meantime, Richard had returned from Ireland, landing in Milford Haven in South Wales. However, fearing a plot, he abandoned his army and fled to North Wales, where he had stronger support. However, support was not forthcoming and at the beginning of August, Henry and his army were at Chester while Richard with a few men held Conway Castle. Henry sent a force under the Earl of Northumberland to capture Richard, which they did by a trick on 15 August. Richard was taken to London and on 29 September was forced to abdicate. On 30 September Henry was proclaimed king at Westminster Hall, the first of the Lancastrian kings.

=== The Wars of the Roses ===
England was spared invasion during the Hundred Years' War against France and Castile, but it was plagued by 32 years (1455–1487) of civil wars known as the Wars of the Roses. The Lancastrian branch of the House of Plantagenet, which had overthrown the direct royal line in 1399, was embroiled in fighting against the Yorkist wing of the dynasty.

The Lancastrian king, Henry VI, was deposed twice during the wars and was murdered after the second deposition. He was replaced by the Yorkist claimant, Edward IV, who ruled until his death. He was succeeded by his young son, Edward V, who, along with his brother, was placed in the Tower of London, where he disappeared under suspicious circumstances. The main benefactor of Edward's disappearance was the boys' regent and uncle, Richard, Duke of Gloucester, who was then crowned king.

In exile in Brittany, Henry Tudor, a distant relation of the Lancastrians, gathered a small, mainly mercenary army and mounted an invasion of Wales in 1485. Welshmen, Lancastrians, and disaffected Yorkists rallied behind Tudor, whose forces encountered Richard and the royal army at Bosworth Field on 22 August. Richard was killed during the fighting, and his forces lost the battle.

Tudor was crowned king as Henry VII, and, after defeating Yorkist rebels in 1487, established the House of Tudor as the sole English ruling dynasty.

=== Perkin Warbeck ===
The pretender Perkin Warbeck made three attempts to invade England. The first, on 3 July 1495, occurred at Deal. Warbeck had arrived on a fleet of ships provided by Maximillian I. An advanced force of supporters and Flemish mercenaries was put ashore to attempt to raise local rebellion. Local forces however, defeated the landing party, killing 150 and capturing 163. Warbeck himself did not land.

The second invasion came in September 1496. Warbeck had been received in Scotland in January 1496 and James IV supported him in an invasion of England later in the year. Unfortunately for the invaders, there was again no local support for Warbeck and the invaders soon returned across the border.

The third, and most successful, invasion took place in Cornwall in September 1497. In May and June 1497, there had been a revolt against Henry VII in Cornwall. This had been suppressed following the rebels' defeat at Blackheath. However, there was still sufficient dissatisfaction that when Warbeck arrived with a small force, he was accepted by many locals as Richard IV and soon raised a force of up to 8,000 rebels. With this army, he besieged Exeter. The fighting, over two days, was bloody, with the rebels making assaults on North and East gates. One or both gates were penetrated but the attackers were driven out after fierce street fighting. 300–400 rebels are alleged to have been killed during the attack. With the failure of the attack, the rebel army withdrew to Taunton. By this time, however, a royal army was approaching and the morale of the rebels began to crack. Warbeck fled on 21 September but was captured at Beaulieu Abbey in Hampshire.

=== Anglo-Spanish War (1585–1604) ===
==== Spanish Armada ====
On 12 July 1588, the Spanish Armada sent by King Philip II of Spain a great fleet of ships, set sail for the channel, planning to ferry a Spanish invasion force under the Duke of Parma to the coast of southeast England from the Netherlands. To intercept the Armada, Queen Elizabeth I sent her navy led by Francis Drake and Charles Howard. The armada was defeated by a combination of miscalculation, misfortune, and an attack of English fire ships off Gravelines at midnight on 28–29 July (7–8 August New Style), which dispersed the Spanish ships to the northeast. They then tried to struggle back to Spain via the North Sea, and then back south past the west coast of Ireland. The shattered remnants reached Spain with losses of some 40 ships and 20,000 dead.

==== Cornwall 1595 ====
A Spanish force composed of three companies of arquebusiers and four galleys (Nuestra Señora de Begoña, Salvador, Peregrina and Bazana) from the fleet commanded by Pedro de Zubiaur, and led by Carlos de Amesquita raided the southwestern coast of Cornwall, where they routed a militia force under Francis Godolphin in Penzance. The Spanish fleet sacked and set on fire the towns of Mousehole, Penzance, Newlyn and Paul. One French merchant ship en route to England and three English ships at Penzance were sunk.

==== Second Spanish Armada ====
In 1596 a few months after English and Dutch forces had raided Cadiz, Philip II in revenge sent the second Spanish Armada to England. This however was met with disaster - off Cape Finisterre storms swept away the fleet before it saw sight of England, costing nearly 5,000 men and 40 ships.

==== Third Spanish Armada ====
An undeterred Philip despite bankruptcy and poor planning sent the third Armada in 1597, but near the English coast another storm dispersed the fleet. Some Spanish ships were able to make landfall in Cornwall and Wales but were either forced to withdraw or were captured. Eventually the Spanish armada were forced to retreat. A fleet sortie led by Charles Howard managed to capture a number of Spanish ships and were able to see the retreat. The Spanish lost 28 more ships and 2,000 men.

=== Lundy ===
1627-1632 Barbary corsair occupation of Lundy.

=== The Raid on the Medway ===
The Raid on the Medway, during the Second Anglo-Dutch War in June 1667, was a successful attack conducted by the Dutch navy on English battleships at a time when most were virtually unmanned and unarmed, laid up in the fleet anchorages off Chatham Dockyard and Gillingham in the county of Kent. At the time, the fortress of Upnor Castle and a barrier chain called the "Gillingham Line" were supposed to protect the English ships.

The Dutch, under nominal command of Willem Joseph van Ghent and Lieutenant-Admiral Michiel de Ruyter, over several days bombarded and captured the town of Sheerness, sailed up the Thames estuary to Gravesend, then sailed into the River Medway to Chatham and Gillingham, where they engaged fortifications with cannon fire, burned or captured three capital ships and ten more ships of the line, and captured and towed away the flagship of the English fleet, HMS Royal Charles.

=== The Glorious Revolution ===
In 1688 the Dutch stadtholder William III of Orange-Nassau landed an army in Devon at the invitation of a group of Protestant nobles who were dissatisfied with what they perceived as the absolutist tendencies of the reigning Catholic King James II. After a brief campaign culminating in the Battle of Reading, William's army successfully forced James into exile in France. After securing French military backing, James attempted to re-invade by mustering troops in Ireland, but was defeated decisively at the Battle of the Boyne in 1690. After Parliament legitimized William's invasion it became known as the Glorious Revolution.

It was the last successful invasion of the British Isles to date.

=== The Battle of Fishguard of 1797 ===
The Battle of Fishguard was a military invasion of Great Britain by Revolutionary France during the War of the First Coalition. The brief campaign, on 22–24 February 1797, is the most recent landing on British soil by a hostile foreign force, and thus is often referred to as the "last invasion of mainland Britain".

The French general Lazare Hoche had devised a three-pronged attack on Britain in support of the Society of United Irishmen. Two forces would land in Britain as a diversionary effort, while the main body would land in Ireland. Adverse weather and ill-discipline halted two of the forces but the third, aimed at landing in Wales and marching on Bristol, went ahead.

After brief clashes with hastily assembled British forces and the local civilian population, the invading force's Irish-American commander, Colonel William Tate, was forced into unconditional surrender on 24 February. In a related naval action, the British captured two of the expedition's vessels, a frigate and a corvette.

== Invasions of Ireland ==
=== Leabhar Gabhála Éireann ===
Lebor Gabála Érenn, The Book of Invasions, describes mythological conquests of Ireland.

=== Viking invasions ===
In the year 795 Vikings (probably of Norwegian origin) raided islands off the coast of Ireland for the first time. Viking invasions and raids continued, before the creation of Norse settlements in the area of modern-day Dublin.

=== Anglo-Norman invasion (1169–72) ===
The Anglo-Norman invasion of Ireland took place during the late 12th century, when Anglo-Normans gradually conquered and acquired large swathes of land in Ireland over which the monarchs of England then claimed sovereignty. The Anglo-Normans justified their invasion using the papal bull Laudabiliter.

=== English invasion (1394) ===
Richard II of England invaded Ireland in 1394 with a fleet of 500 ships and 8,000-10,000 men with the aim of preventing the Lordship of Ireland from being overrun by Gaelic Irish chieftains. The invasion was a success and several Gaelic chieftains submitted to English overlordship.

== Invasions of Scotland ==
=== Viking raids and invasions ===
While there are few records, the Vikings are thought to have led their first raids in Scotland on the holy island of Iona in 794, the year following the raid on the other holy island of Lindisfarne, Northumbria.

In 839, a large Norse fleet invaded via the River Tay and River Earn, both of which were highly navigable, and reached into the heart of the Pictish kingdom of Fortriu. They defeated Eogán mac Óengusa, king of the Picts, his brother Bran and the king of the Scots of Dál Riata, Áed mac Boanta, along with many members of the Pictish aristocracy in battle. The sophisticated kingdom that had been built fell apart, as did the Pictish leadership, which had been stable for more than a hundred years since the time of Óengus mac Fergusa. The accession of Cináed mac Ailpín as king of both Picts and Scots can be attributed to the aftermath of this event.

=== The Wars of Independence ===
Following the disputed succession of the Scottish crown on the death of Alexander III, Edward I led an English invasion in 1296, sacking Berwick upon Tweed and subjugating Scotland. The following year the Scots rose under the leadership of William Wallace. They decisively defeated the English in the Battle of Stirling Bridge, and began a brief invasion of northern England. Edward rushed north with his army and inflicted a crushing defeat on Wallace at Falkirk. Wallace was captured and executed afterward. Further campaigns by Edward in 1300 and 1301 led to a truce between the Scots and the English in 1302. After another campaign in 1303/1304, Stirling Castle, the last major Scottish held stronghold, fell to the English, and in February 1304, negotiations led to most of the remaining nobles paying homage to Edward and to the Scots all but surrendering. However, the Scots rose again under their new king, Robert the Bruce, and routed the army of Edward II during the Battle of Bannockburn in 1314. Peace was concluded in 1327.

In 1332, Edward III supported the claims of Edward Balliol to the Scottish throne. Balliol led an invasion, and following his success at Dupplin Moor, Edward III also moved north. By 1333, much of Scotland was under English occupation, with eight of the Scottish lowland counties being ceded to England by Edward Balliol. In 1334, Edward III invaded again, but he accomplished little and retreated in February 1335 having failed to bring the Scots to battle. He and Edward Balliol returned again in July with an army of 13,000, and advanced through Scotland, first to Glasgow and then Perth, where Edward III installed himself as his army looted and destroyed the surrounding countryside. In May 1336 an English army under Henry of Lancaster invaded, followed in July by another army under King Edward. Together, they ravaged much of the north-east and sacked Elgin and Aberdeen, while a third army ravaged the south-west and the Clyde valley. Philip VI of France announced that he intended to aid the Scots by invading England, prompting Edward's retreat. By late 1336, the Scots had regained control over virtually all of Scotland. Although the war continued until the Treaty of Berwick in 1357, the English did not return to Scotland.

=== The Rough Wooing ===
In 1542 the infant Mary, Queen of Scots, acceded to the Scottish throne. Henry VIII sought a dynastic marriage between Mary and his son Edward. An initial proposal was agreed, but due to internal divisions between pro-France and pro-English factions, the Scots rescinded the agreement. War broke out and the English army sacked Edinburgh in May 1544. The battle of Ancrum Moor the following year led to the English withdrawal. After Henry's death and the installation of Protector Somerset, the English returned, defeating the Scots at the battle of Pinkie in September 1547. They established a base at Haddington and put much of southern Scotland under military rule.

In response, the Scots requested aid from the French, and French troops arrived at Leith in 1548. The Treaty of Norham ended hostilities in 1551, although the French remained until the Siege of Leith in 1560, when they were ejected by combined Protestant Scottish and English forces. This latter period of the conflict is sometimes referred to as a proxy war, fought by Scottish factions on behalf of France and England.

== See also ==
- Invasion of England
- Invasion of the Channel Islands (disambiguation)
