= Invasion of the Channel Islands =

Invasion of the Channel Islands may refer to:

- German invasion of the Channel Islands, 1940 during World War II
- Invasion of Jersey (disambiguation), any of several invasions of the island of Jersey
