= Invasion of Jersey =

Invasion of Jersey may refer to a number of historical events including:

- Invasion of Jersey (1651), by Parliamentarian forces during the Wars of the Three Kingdoms
- French invasion of Jersey (1779), a French attempt to land at Jersey during the Anglo-French War (1778–1783)
- Battle of Jersey, in 1781 during the Anglo-French War (1778–1783)
- German invasion of the Channel Islands, in 1940 during the Second World War
