= History of the British Isles =

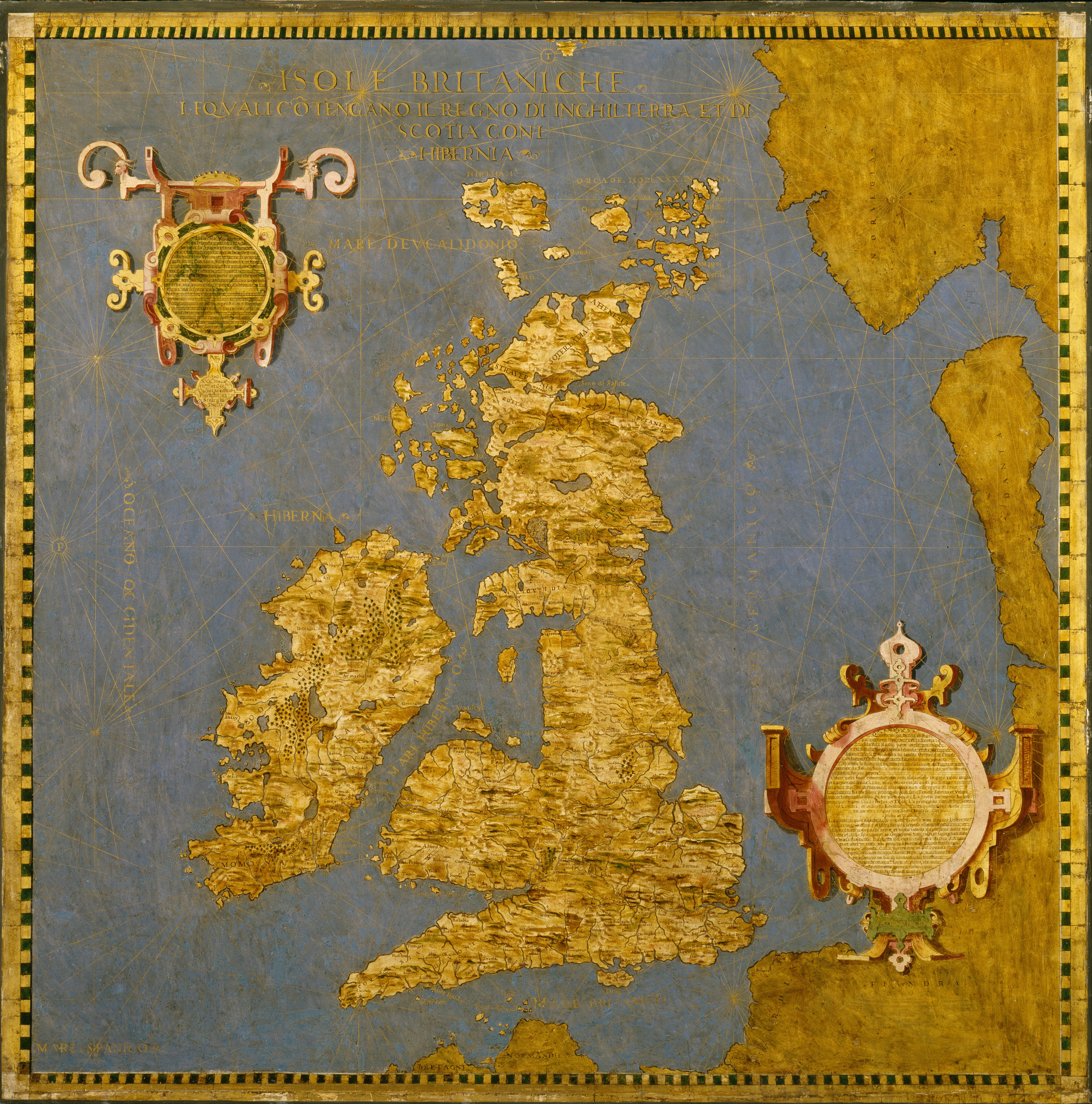
British Isles (1565), by Ignazio Danti

The history of the British Isles began with its sporadic human habitation during the Palaeolithic from around 900,000 years ago. The British Isles has been continually occupied since the early Holocene, the current geological epoch, which started around 11,700 years ago. Mesolithic hunter-gatherers migrated from the Continent soon afterwards at a time when there was no sea barrier between Britain and Europe, but there was between Britain and Ireland. There were almost complete population replacements by migrations from the Continent at the start of the Neolithic around 4,100 BC and the Bronze Age around 2,500 BC. Later migrations contributed to the political and cultural fabric of the islands and the transition from tribal societies to feudal ones at different times in different regions.

England and Scotland were sovereign kingdoms until 1603, and then legally separate under one monarch until 1707, when they united as one kingdom. Wales and Ireland were composed of several independent kingdoms with shifting boundaries until the medieval period.

The British monarch was head of state of all of the countries of the British Isles from the Union of the Crowns in 1603 until the enactment of the Republic of Ireland Act in 1949.

== Prehistoric ==
=== Palaeolithic and Mesolithic periods ===
The Palaeolithic and Mesolithic, also known as the Old and Middle Stone Ages, were characterised by hunter-gatherer societies and a reliance on stone tool technologies.

==== Palaeolithic ====
During the Palaeolithic, Britain was repeatedly colonised by archaic humans during temperate interglacial periods, before retreating during the harsh cold glacial periods. This process of colonisation and retreat is thought to have occurred at least 9 separate times. The earliest evidence of humans in the British Isles are stone tools and now destroyed footprints found near Happisburgh in Norfolk, England, dating to around 900,000 years ago, possibly produced by the extinct human species Homo antecessor. The earliest human remains from Britain are those of "Boxgrove Man", possibly Homo heidelbergensis, from the Boxgrove site in West Sussex, dating to 480,000 years ago. Neanderthals inhabited Britain intermittently from 400-330,000 years ago until around 50-40,000 years ago. The Upper Palaeolithic occupation of Britain by modern humans began around 40,000 years ago.

==== Mesolithic (10,000 to 4,500 BC) ====
By the Mesolithic, Homo sapiens, or modern humans, were the only hominid species to still survive in the British Isles. There was then limited occupation by Ahrensburgian hunter gatherers, but this came to an end when there was a final downturn in temperature which lasted from around 9,400 to 9,200 BC. Mesolithic people occupied Britain by around 9,000 BC, and it has been occupied ever since. By 8000 BC temperatures were higher than today, and birch woodlands spread rapidly, but there was a cold spell around 6,200 BC which lasted about 150 years. The British Isles were linked to continental Europe by a territory named Doggerland. The plains of Doggerland were thought to have finally been submerged around 6500 to 6000 BC, but recent evidence suggests that the bridge may have lasted until between 5800 and 5400 BC, and possibly as late as 3800 BC.

=== Neolithic (4500 to 2500 BC) ===
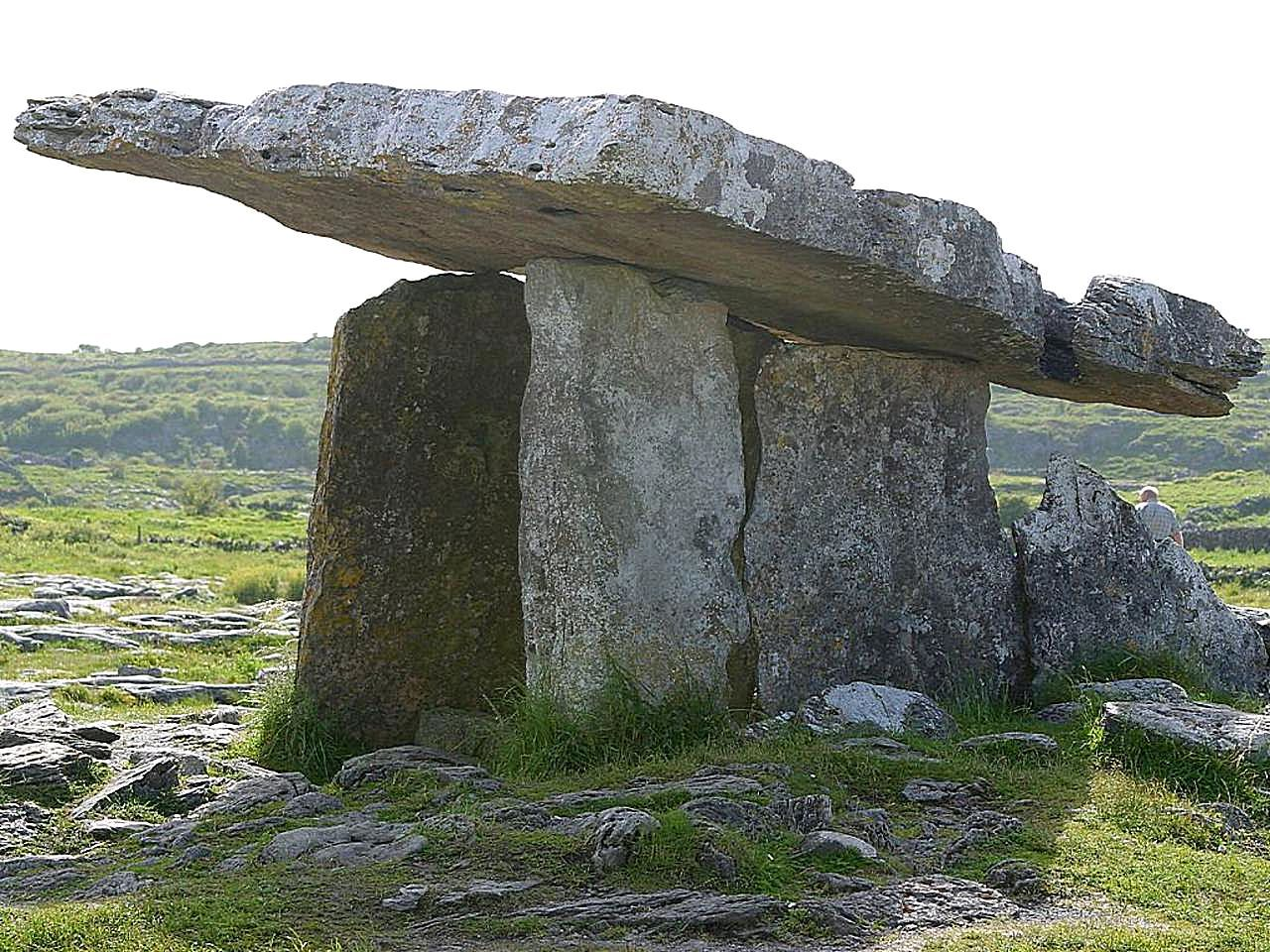
Poulnabrone dolmen in Ireland

Around 4000 BC migrants began arriving from central Europe. Although the earliest indisputably acknowledged languages spoken in the British Isles belonged to the Celtic branch of the Indo-European family it is not known what language these early farming people spoke. These migrants brought new ideas, leading to a radical transformation of society and landscape that has been called the Neolithic Revolution. The Neolithic period in the British Isles was characterised by the adoption of agriculture and sedentary living. To make room for the new farmland, these early agricultural communities undertook mass deforestation across the islands, dramatically and permanently transforming the landscape. At the same time, new types of stone tools requiring more skill began to be produced; new technologies included polishing.

The Neolithic also saw the construction of a wide variety of monuments in the landscape, many of which were megalithic in nature. The earliest of these are the chambered tombs of the Early Neolithic, although in the Late Neolithic this form of monumentalisation was replaced by the construction of stone circles, a trend that would continue into the following Bronze Age. These constructions are taken to reflect ideological changes, with new ideas about religion, ritual and social hierarchy.

=== Bronze Age (2500 to 600 BC) ===
In the British Isles, the Bronze Age saw the transformation of British and Irish society and landscape. It saw the adoption of agriculture, as communities gave up their hunter-gatherer modes of existence to begin farming. During the British Bronze Age, large megalithic monuments similar to those from the Late Neolithic continued to be constructed or modified, including such sites as Avebury, Stonehenge, Silbury Hill and Must Farm. This has been described as a time "when elaborate ceremonial practices emerged among some communities of subsistence agriculturalists of western Europe".

=== Iron Age (1200 BC to 600 AD) ===
As its name suggests, the British Iron Age is also characterised by the adoption of iron, a metal which was used to produce a variety of different tools, ornaments and weapons.

In the course of the first millennium BC, and possibly earlier, some combination of trans-cultural diffusion and immigration from continental Europe resulted in the establishment of Celtic languages in the islands, eventually giving rise to the Insular Celtic group. What languages were spoken in the islands before is unknown, though they are assumed to have been Pre-Indo-European.

== Classical period ==
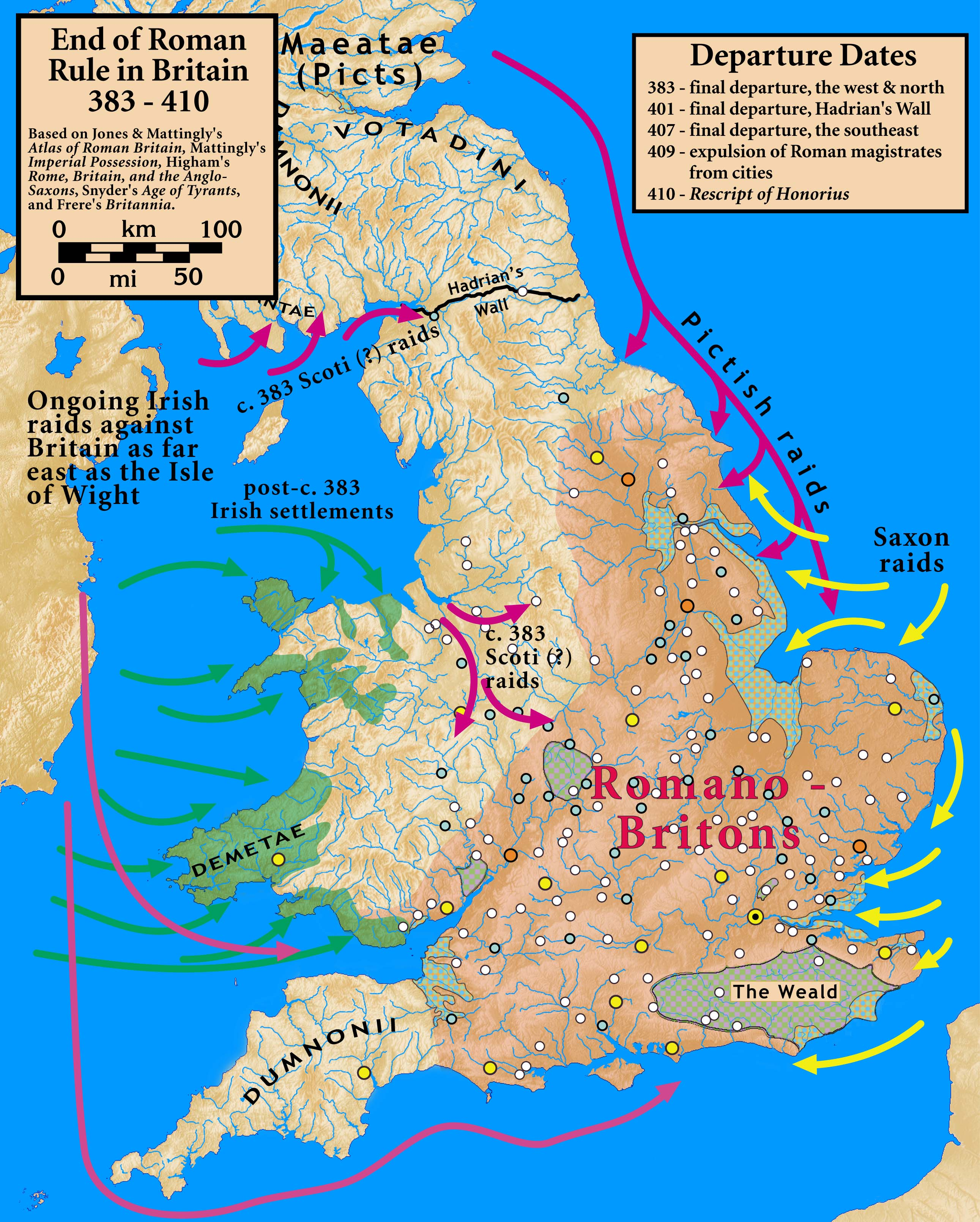
End of Roman rule in Britain, 383–410

In 55 and 54 BC, the Roman general Gaius Julius Caesar launched two separate invasions of the British Isles, though neither resulted in a full Roman occupation of the island. In 43 AD, southern Britain became part of the Roman Empire. On Nero's accession Roman Britain extended as far north as Lindum (Lincoln). Gaius Suetonius Paulinus, the conqueror of Mauretania (modern-day Algeria and Morocco), then became governor of Britain, where he spent most of his governorship campaigning in Wales. Eventually in 60 AD he penned up the last resistance and the last of the druids in the island of Mona (Anglesey). Paulinus led his army across the Menai Strait and massacred the druids and burnt their sacred groves. At the moment of triumph, news came of the Boudican revolt in East Anglia.

The suppression of the Boudican revolt was followed by a period of expansion of the Roman province, including the subjugation of south Wales. Between 77 and 83 AD the new governor Gnaeus Julius Agricola led a series of campaigns which enlarged the province significantly, taking in north Wales, northern Britain, and most of Caledonia (Scotland). The Celts fought with determination and resilience, but they faced a superior, professional army, and it is likely that between 100,000 and 250,000 may have perished in the conquest period.

== Medieval period ==
=== Early medieval ===
The spread of Angles (orange), Saxons (blue) and Jutes (green) to the British Isles around 500 AD. Primarily based on Bede's Ecclesiastical History of the English People.

The early medieval period saw a series of invasions of Britain by the Germanic-speaking Angles and Saxons, beginning in the 5th century. Anglo-Saxon kingdoms were formed and, through wars with British states, gradually came to cover the territory of present-day England. Scotland was divided between the Picts, Dál Riata, the Kingdom of Strathclyde and the Angles. Around 600, seven principal kingdoms had emerged, beginning the so-called period of the Heptarchy. During that period, the Anglo-Saxon states were Christianised (the conversion of the British states had begun much earlier).

In the 9th century, Vikings from Scandinavia conquered most of England and the Scots and Picts were combined to form the Kingdom of Alba. Only the Kingdom of Wessex under Alfred the Great survived and even managed to re-conquer and unify England for much of the 10th century. This unified most of England before a new series of Danish raids in the late 10th century. Danish rule was overthrown and the local House of Wessex was restored to power under Edward the Confessor for about two decades until his death in 1066.

=== Late medieval ===
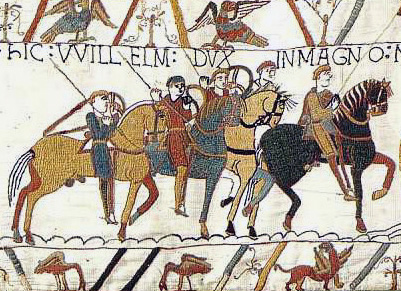
Bayeux Tapestry depicting events leading to the Norman Conquest, which defined much of the subsequent history of the British Isles

In 1066, William, Duke of Normandy claimed the English throne and invaded England. He defeated King Harold Godwinson at the Battle of Hastings. Proclaiming himself to be King William I, he strengthened his regime by appointing loyal members of the Norman elite to many positions of authority, building a system of castles across the country and ordering a census of his new kingdom, the Domesday Book. The late medieval period was characterized by many battles between England and France, coming to a head in the Hundred Years' War, from which France emerged victorious. The English monarchs throughout the late medieval period belonged to the houses of Plantagenet, Lancaster, and York.

Under John Balliol, Scotland entered into the Auld Alliance with France in 1295. In 1296, England invaded Scotland, but in the following year William Wallace defeated the English army at the Battle of Stirling Bridge. However, King Edward I of England came north to defeat Wallace himself at the Battle of Falkirk. In 1320, the Declaration of Arbroath, seen as an important document in the development of Scottish national identity, led to the recognition of Scottish independence by major European dynasties. In 1328, the Treaty of Edinburgh-Northampton with England recognised Scottish independence under Robert the Bruce.

== Early modern period ==
Major historical events in the early modern period include the English Renaissance, the English Reformation and Scottish Reformation, the English Civil War, the Restoration of Charles II, the Glorious Revolution, the Treaty of Union, the Scottish Enlightenment and the formation of the First British Empire.

== 19th century ==
=== 1801 to 1837 ===
==== Union of Great Britain and Ireland ====
The Kingdom of Ireland was a settler state; the monarch was the incumbent monarch of England and later of Great Britain. The Lord Lieutenant of Ireland headed the government on behalf of the monarch. He was assisted by the Chief Secretary of Ireland. Both were responsible to the government in London rather than to the Parliament of Ireland. Before the Constitution of 1782, the Irish parliament was also severely fettered, and decisions in Irish courts could be overturned on appeal to the British House of Lords in London.

The Anglo-Irish ruling class gained a degree of independence in the 1780s thanks to Henry Grattan. During this time the effects of the penal laws on the primarily Roman Catholic population were reduced, and some property-owning Catholics were granted the franchise in 1794; however, they were still excluded from becoming members of the Irish House of Commons. This brief period of limited independence came to an end following the Irish Rebellion of 1798, which occurred during the British war with revolutionary France. The British government's fear of an independent Ireland siding against them with the French resulted in the decision to unite the two countries. This was brought about by legislation in the parliaments of both kingdoms and came into effect on 1 January 1801. The Irish had been led to believe by the British that their loss of legislative independence would be compensated for with Catholic Emancipation, i.e. by the removal of civil disabilities placed upon Roman Catholics in both Great Britain and Ireland. However, King George III was bitterly opposed to any such Emancipation and succeeded in defeating his government's attempts to introduce it.

==== Napoleonic Wars ====
During the War of the Second Coalition (1799–1801), William Pitt the Younger (1759–1806) provided strong leadership in London. Britain occupied most of the French and Dutch overseas possessions, the Netherlands having become a satellite state of France in 1796. After a short peace, in May 1803, war was declared again. Napoleon's plans to invade Britain failed, chiefly due to the inferiority of his navy. In 1805 Lord Nelson's fleet decisively defeated the French and Spanish at Trafalgar, ending any hopes Napoleon had to wrest control of the oceans away from the British.

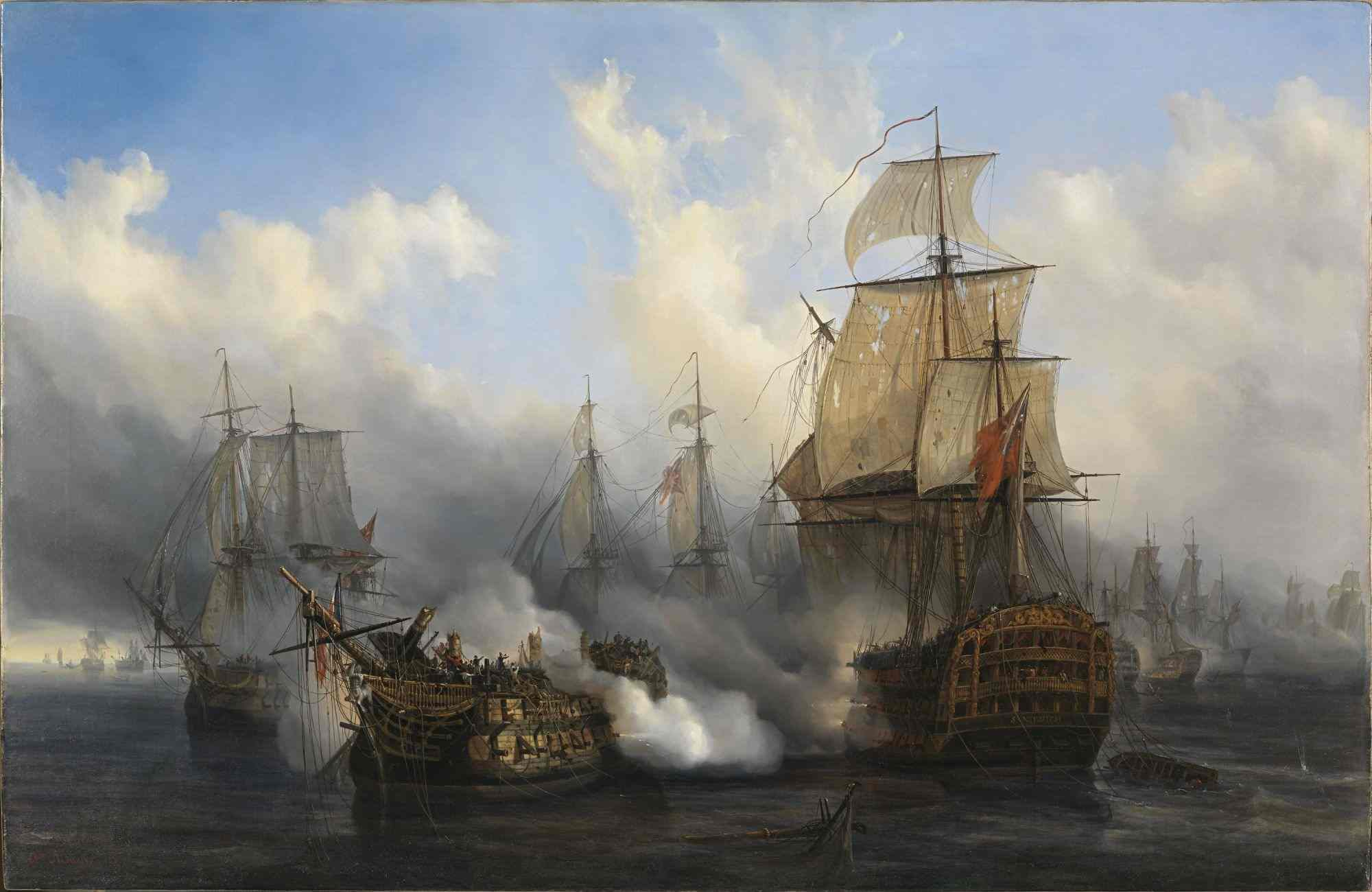
The British HMS Sandwich fires on the French flagship at Trafalgar.

The British Army remained a minimal threat to France; it maintained a standing strength of just 220,000 men at the height of the Napoleonic Wars, whereas France's armies exceeded a million men—in addition to the armies of numerous allies and several hundred thousand national guardsmen that Napoleon could draft into the French armies when they were needed. Although the Royal Navy effectively disrupted France's extra-continental trade—both by seizing and threatening French shipping and by seizing French colonial possessions—it could do nothing about France's trade with the major continental economies and posed little threat to French territory in Europe. France's population and agricultural capacity far outstripped that of Britain.

In 1806, Napoleon set up the Continental System to end British trade with French-controlled territories. However, Britain had great industrial capacity and mastery of the seas. It built up economic strength through trade, rendering the Continental System largely ineffective. As Napoleon realized that extensive trade was going through Spain and Russia, he invaded those two countries. He tied down his forces in Spain, and lost very badly in Russia in 1812. The Spanish uprising in 1808 at last permitted Britain to gain a foothold on the Continent. The Duke of Wellington and his army of British and Portuguese gradually pushed the French out of Spain, and in early 1814, as Napoleon was being driven back in the east by the Prussians, Austrians, and Russians, Wellington invaded southern France. After Napoleon's surrender and exile to the island of Elba, peace appeared to have returned, but when he escaped back into France in 1815, the British and their allies had to fight him again. The armies of Wellington and Blucher defeated Napoleon once and for all at Waterloo.

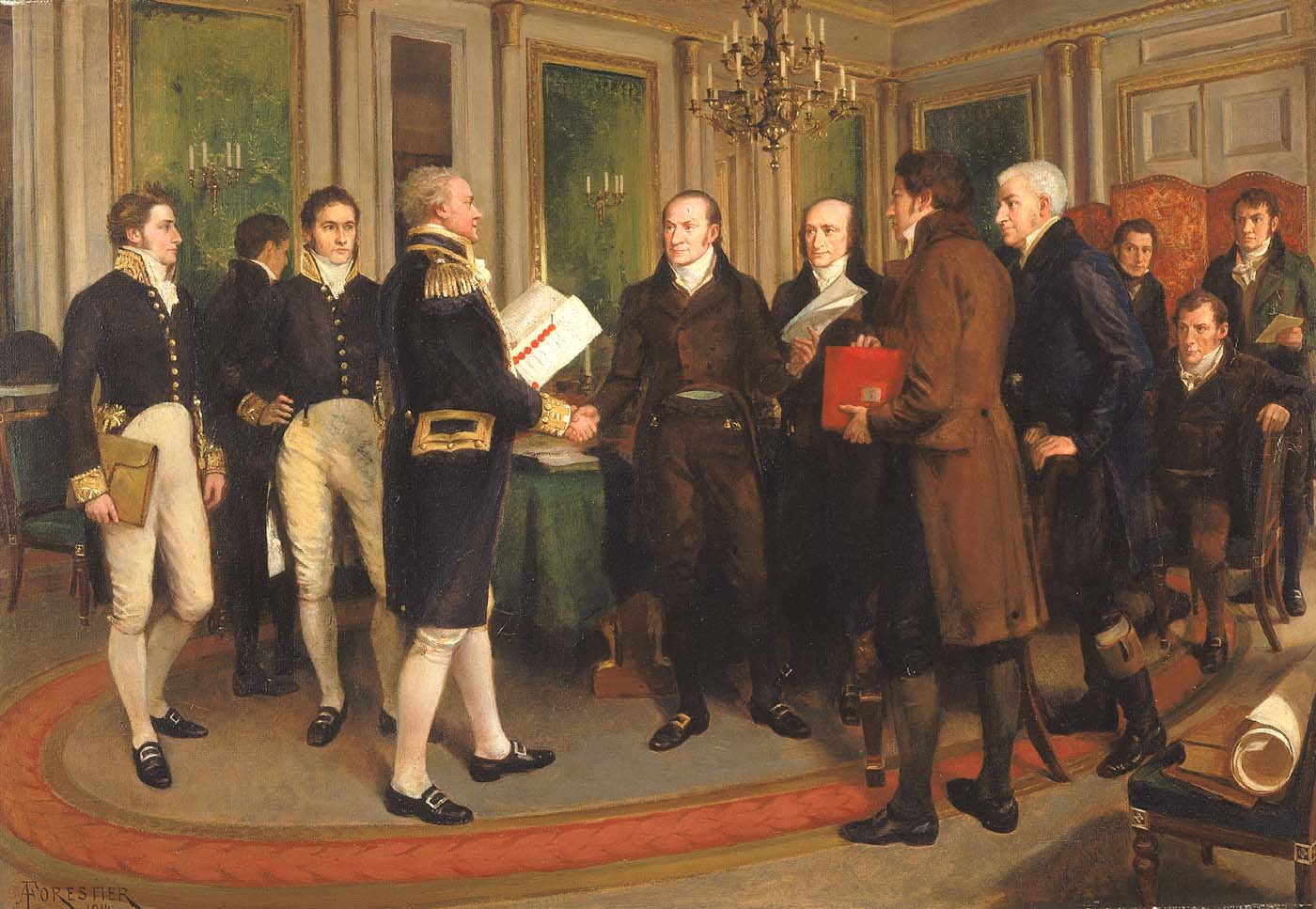
Signing of the Treaty of Ghent with the United States (1814), by A. Forestier

Simultaneous with the Napoleonic Wars, trade disputes and British impressment of American sailors led to the War of 1812 with the United States. A central event in American history, it was little noticed in Britain, where all attention was focused on the struggle with France. The British could devote few resources to the conflict until the fall of Napoleon in 1814. American frigates also inflicted a series of embarrassing defeats on the British navy, which was short on manpower due to the conflict in Europe. The Duke of Wellington argued that an outright victory over the U.S. was impossible because the Americans controlled the western Great Lakes and had destroyed the power of Britain's Indian allies. A full-scale British invasion was defeated in upstate New York. Peace was agreed to at the end of 1814, but unaware of this, Andrew Jackson won a great victory over the British at the Battle of New Orleans in January 1815 (news took several weeks to cross the Atlantic before the advent of steam ships). The Treaty of Ghent subsequently ended the war with no territorial changes. It was the last war between Britain and the United States.

==== George IV and William IV ====
Britain emerged from the Napoleonic Wars a very different country than it had been in 1793. As industrialisation progressed, society changed, becoming more urban and less rural. The postwar period saw an economic slump, and poor harvests and inflation caused widespread social unrest. Europe after 1815 was on guard against a return of Jacobinism, and even liberal Britain saw the passage of the Six Acts in 1819, which proscribed radical activities. By the end of the 1820s, along with a general economic recovery, many of these repressive laws were repealed and in 1828 new legislation guaranteed the civil rights of religious dissenters.

A weak ruler as regent (1811–1820) and king (1820–1830), George IV let his ministers take full charge of government affairs, playing a far lesser role than his father, George III. His governments, with little help from the king, presided over victory in the Napoleonic Wars, negotiated the peace settlement, and attempted to deal with the social and economic malaise that followed. His brother William IV ruled (1830–37), but was little involved in politics. His reign saw several reforms: the poor law was updated, child labour was restricted, slavery was abolished in nearly all the British Empire, and, most important, the Reform Act 1832 refashioned the British electoral system.

There were no major wars until the Crimean War (1853–1856). While Prussia, Austria, and Russia, as absolute monarchies, tried to suppress liberalism wherever it might occur, the British came to terms with new ideas. Britain intervened in Portugal in 1826 to defend a constitutional government there, recognising the independence of Spain's American colonies in 1824. British merchants and financiers, and later railway builders, played major roles in the economies of most Latin American nations.

==== Whig reforms of the 1830s ====
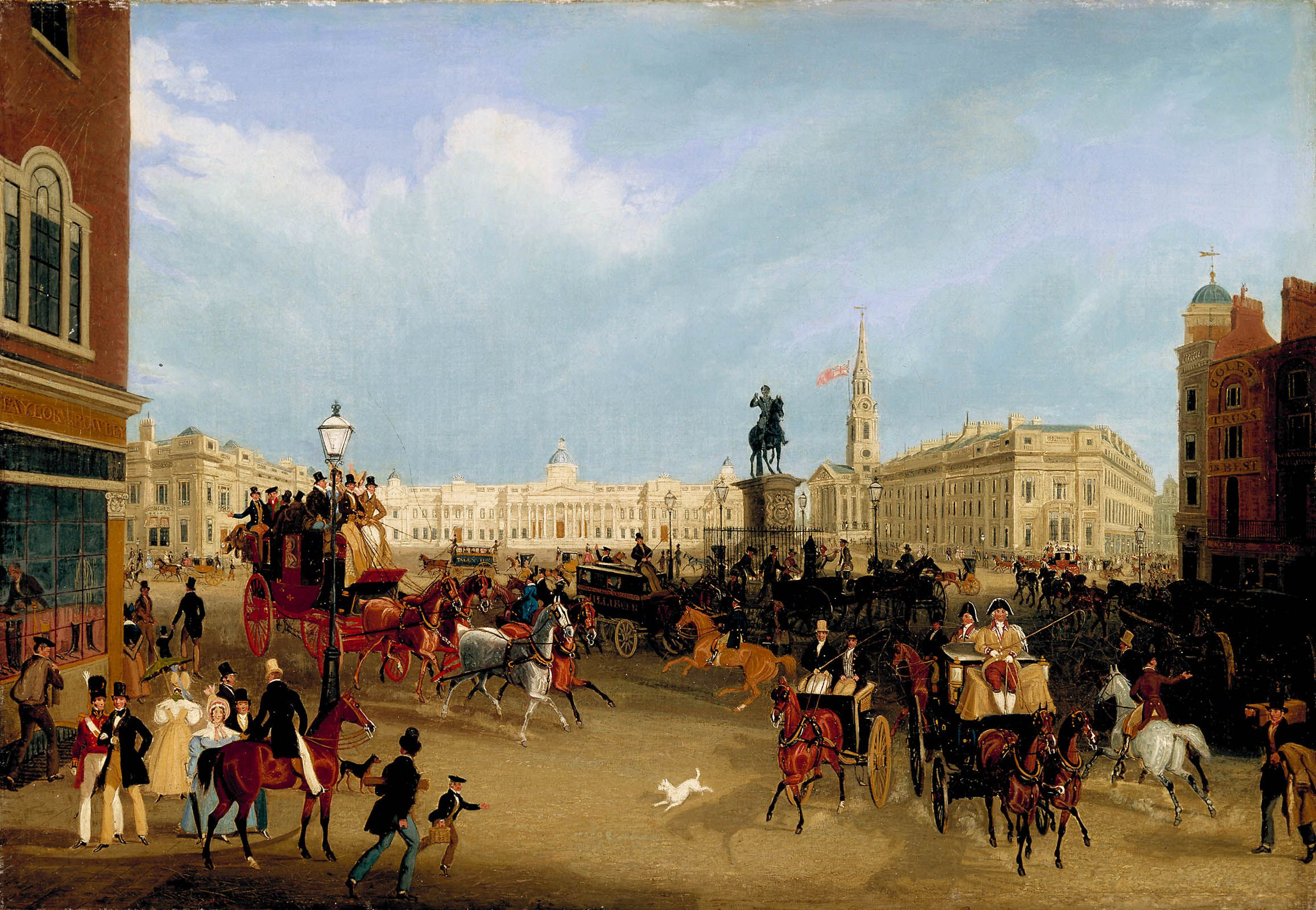
A painting by James Pollard showing the Trafalgar Square before the erection of Nelson's Column

The Whig Party recovered its strength and unity by supporting moral reforms, especially the reform of the electoral system, the abolition of slavery and emancipation of the Catholics. Catholic emancipation was secured in the Catholic Relief Act 1829, which removed the most substantial restrictions on Roman Catholics in Great Britain and Ireland.

The Whigs became champions of Parliamentary reform. They made Lord Grey prime minister 1830–1834, and the Reform Act 1832 became their signature measure. It broadened the franchise and ended the system of "rotten borough" and "pocket boroughs" (where elections were controlled by powerful families), and instead redistributed power on the basis of population. It added 217,000 voters to an electorate of 435,000 in England and Wales. The main effect of the act was to weaken the power of the landed gentry, and enlarge the power of the professional and business middle-class, which now for the first time had a significant voice in Parliament. However, the great majority of manual workers, clerks, and farmers did not have enough property to qualify to vote. The aristocracy continued to dominate the government, the Army and Royal Navy, and high society. After parliamentary investigations demonstrated the horrors of child labour, limited reforms were passed in 1833.

Chartism emerged after the 1832 Reform Bill failed to give the vote to the working class. Activists denounced the "betrayal" of the working classes and the "sacrificing" of their "interests" by the "misconduct" of the government. In 1838, Chartists issued the People's Charter demanding manhood suffrage, equal sized election districts, voting by ballots, payment of Members of Parliament (so that poor men could serve), annual Parliaments, and abolition of property requirements. The ruling class saw the movement as dangerous, so the Chartists were unable to force serious constitutional debate. Historians see Chartism as both a continuation of the 18th century fight against corruption and as a new stage in demands for democracy in an industrial society. In 1832 Parliament abolished slavery in the Empire with the Slavery Abolition Act 1833. The government purchased the slaves for £20,000,000 (the money went to rich plantation owners who mostly lived in England), and freed the slaves, especially those in the Caribbean sugar islands.

==== Leadership ====
Prime Ministers of the period included: William Pitt the Younger, Lord Grenville, Duke of Portland, Spencer Perceval, Lord Liverpool, George Canning, Lord Goderich, Duke of Wellington, Lord Grey, Lord Melbourne, and Sir Robert Peel.

=== Victorian era ===
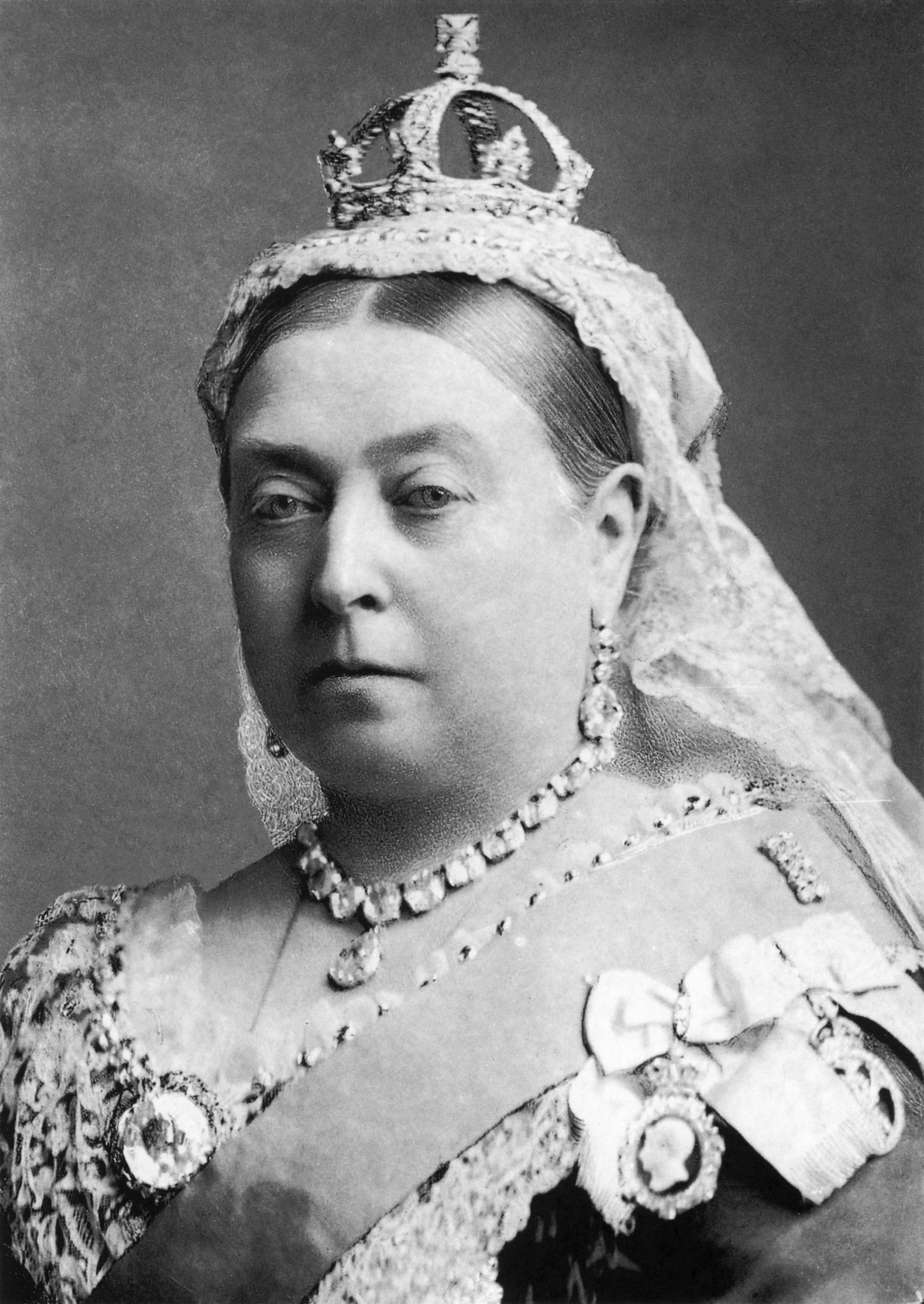
Queen Victoria (1837–1901)

The Victorian era was the period of Queen Victoria's rule between 1837 and 1901 which signified the height of the British Industrial Revolution and the apex of the British Empire. Scholars debate whether the Victorian period—as defined by a variety of sensibilities and political concerns that have come to be associated with the Victorians—actually begins with the passage of the Reform Act 1832. The era was preceded by the Regency era and succeeded by the Edwardian period. Victoria became queen in 1837 at age 18. Her long reign saw Britain reach the zenith of its economic and political power, with the introduction of steam ships, railroads, photography, and the telegraph. Britain again remained mostly inactive in Continental politics.

==== Free trade imperialism ====
The Great London Exhibition of 1851 clearly demonstrated Britain's dominance in engineering and industry; that lasted until the rise of the United States and Germany in the 1890s. Using the imperial tools of free trade and financial investment, it exerted major influence on many countries outside Europe, especially in Latin America and Asia. Thus Britain had both a formal Empire based on British rule as well as an informal one based on the British pound.

==== Russia, France and the Ottoman Empire ====
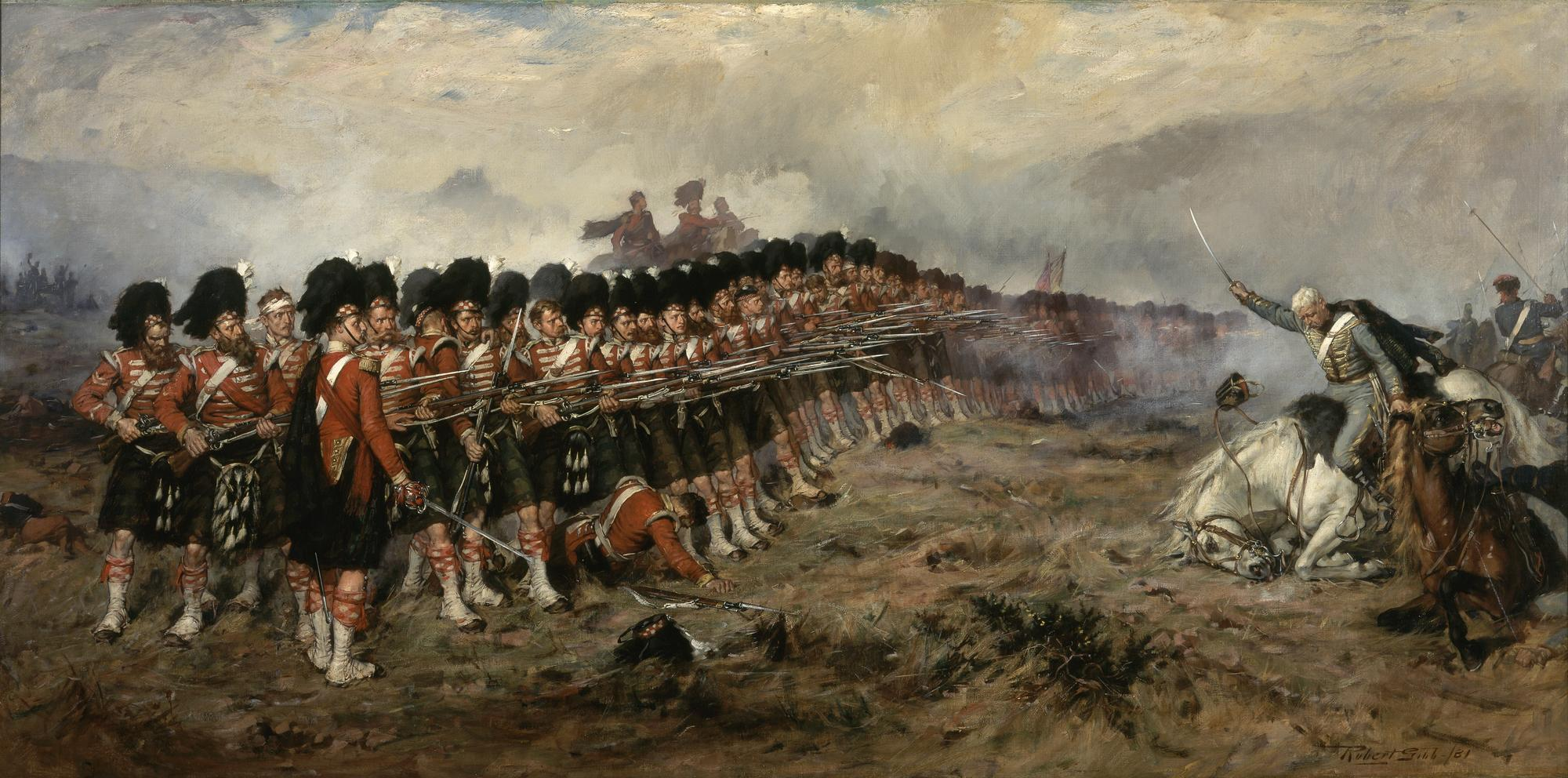
Depiction of The Thin Red Line at the Battle of Balaclava

In 1853, Britain and France intervened in the Crimean War against Russia. They captured the Russian port of Sevastopol, compelling Tsar Nicholas I to ask for peace. The war brought exceptionally high casualty rates, largely due to the spread of disease. In response, Florence Nightingale, the founder of modern nursing, implemented strict sanitary protocols during the treatment of soldiers.

Beginning in the 1870s, concern grew within Britain regarding a potential collapse of the Ottoman Empire. It was believed that a collapse of the empire would set off a scramble for its territory and possibly plunge Britain into war. To head that off, Britain sought to keep the Russians from occupying Constantinople and taking over the Bosporous Strait, as well as from threatening India via Afghanistan.

The next Russo-Ottoman war in 1877 led to another European intervention, although this time at the negotiating table. The Congress of Berlin blocked Russia from imposing the harsh Treaty of San Stefano on the Ottoman Empire. Despite its alliance with the French in the Crimean War, Britain viewed the Second Empire of Napoleon III with some distrust, especially as the emperor constructed ironclad warships and began returning France to a more active foreign policy.

==== American Civil War ====
During the American Civil War (1861–1865), British leaders favoured the Confederacy, a major source of cotton for textile mills. Prince Albert was effective in defusing a war scare in late 1861. The British people, however, who depended heavily on American food imports, generally favoured the Union. What little cotton was available came from New York, as the blockade by the US Navy shut down 95% of Southern exports to Britain. In September 1862, Abraham Lincoln announced the Emancipation Proclamation. Since support of the Confederacy now meant supporting the institution of slavery, there was no possibility of European intervention. The British sold arms to both sides, built blockade runners for a lucrative trade with the Confederacy, and surreptitiously allowed warships to be built for the Confederacy. The warships caused a major diplomatic row that was resolved in the Alabama Claims in 1872, in the Americans' favour.

==== Empire expands ====
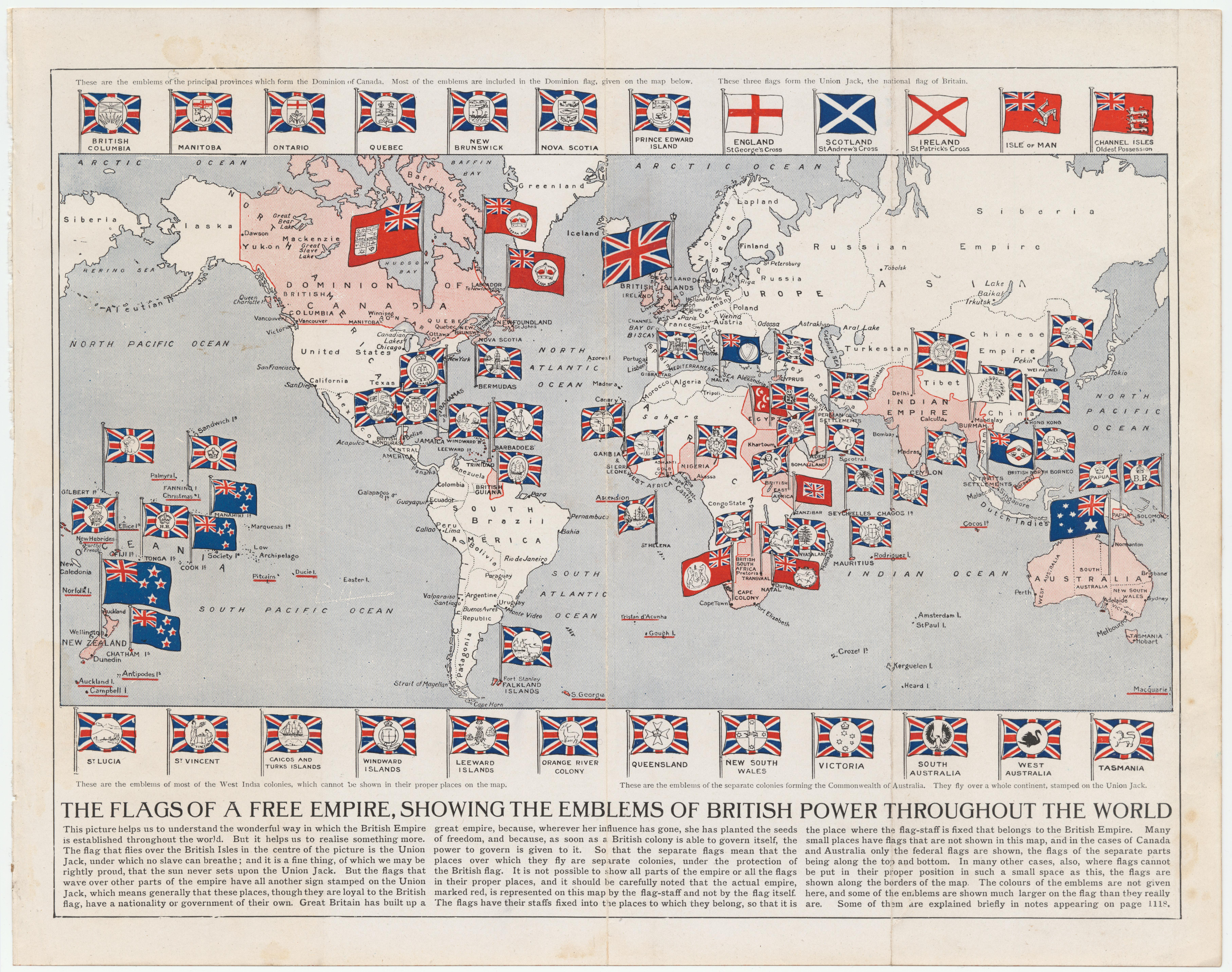
Map of the British Empire from 1910, with the ensigns and emblems of several British dominions and colonies displayed

In 1867, Britain united most of its North American colonies as Canada, giving it self-government and responsibility for its own defense, but Canada did not have an independent foreign policy until 1931. Several of the colonies temporarily refused to join the Dominion despite pressure from both Canada and Britain; the last one, Newfoundland, held out until 1949. The second half of the 19th century saw a huge expansion of Britain's colonial empire, mostly in Africa. A talk of the Union Jack flying "from Cairo to Cape Town" only became a reality at the end of the Great War. Having possessions on six continents, Britain had to defend all of its empire and did so with a volunteer army, the only great power in Europe to have no conscription. Some questioned whether the country was overstretched.

The rise of the German Empire since its creation in 1871 posed a new challenge, for it (along with the United States), threatened to usurp Britain's place as the world's foremost industrial power. Germany acquired a number of colonies in Africa and the Pacific, but Chancellor Otto von Bismarck succeeded in achieving general peace through his balance of power strategy. When William II became emperor in 1888, he discarded Bismarck, began using bellicose language, and planned to build a navy to rival Britain's.

Ever since Britain had wrested control of the Cape Colony from the Netherlands during the Napoleonic Wars, it had co-existed with Dutch settlers who had migrated further away from the Cape and created two republics of their own. The British imperial vision called for control over these new countries, and the Dutch-speaking "Boers" (or "Afrikaners") fought back in the War in 1899–1902. Outgunned by a mighty empire, the Boers waged a guerrilla war (which certain other British territories would later employ to attain independence). This gave the British regulars a difficult fight, but their weight of numbers, superior equipment, and often brutal tactics, eventually brought about a British victory. The war had been costly in human rights and was widely criticised by Liberals in Britain and worldwide. However, the United States gave its support. The Boer republics were merged into the Union of South Africa in 1910; this had internal self-government, but its foreign policy was controlled by London and it was an integral part of the British Empire.

==== Ireland and the move to Home Rule ====
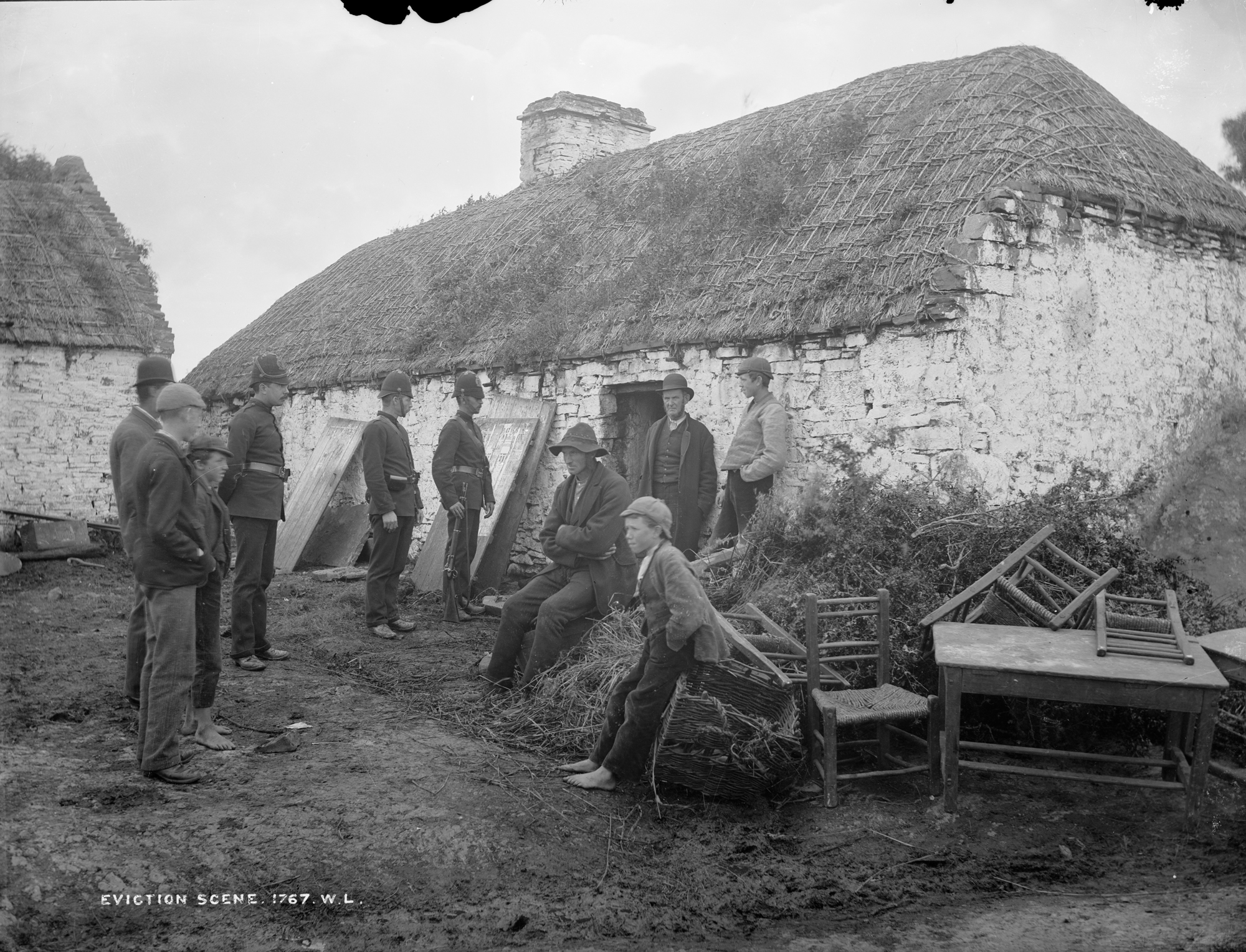
Forced eviction of Irish tenant in County Clare, c. 1888

Part of the agreement which led to the 1800 Act of Union stipulated that the Penal Laws in Ireland were to be repealed and Catholic emancipation granted. However King George III blocked emancipation, arguing that to grant it would break his coronation oath to defend the Anglican Church. A campaign by the lawyer Daniel O'Connell, and the death of George III, led to the concession of Catholic emancipation in 1829, allowing Roman Catholics to sit in the Parliament of the United Kingdom. But Catholic emancipation was not O'Connell's ultimate goal, which was Repeal of the Act of Union with Great Britain. On 1 January 1843 O'Connell confidently, but wrongly, declared that Repeal would be achieved that year. When potato blight hit the island in 1846, much of the rural population was left without food, because cash crops were being exported to pay rents.

British politicians such as the Prime Minister Robert Peel were at this time wedded to the economic policy of laissez-faire, which argued against state intervention. While funds were raised by private individuals and charities, lack of adequate action let the problem become a catastrophe. Cottiers (or farm labourers) were largely wiped out during what is known in Ireland as the "Great Hunger". A significant minority elected Unionists, who championed the Union. A Church of Ireland former Tory barrister turned nationalist campaigner, Isaac Butt, established a new moderate nationalist movement, the Home Rule League, in the 1870s. After Butt's death the Home Rule Movement, or the Irish Parliamentary Party as it had become known, was turned into a major political force under the guidance of William Shaw and a radical young Protestant landowner, Charles Stewart Parnell.

Parnell's movement campaigned for "Home Rule", by which they meant that Ireland would govern itself as a region within Great Britain. Two Home Rule Bills (1886 and 1893) were introduced by Liberal prime minister William Ewart Gladstone, but neither became law, mainly due to opposition from the Conservative Party and the House of Lords. The issue was a source of contention throughout Ireland, as a significant majority of Unionists (largely based in Ulster), opposed Home Rule, fearing that a Catholic Nationalist ("Rome Rule") Parliament in Dublin would discriminate against them, impose Roman Catholic doctrine, and impose tariffs on industry. While most of Ireland was primarily agricultural, six of the counties in Ulster were the location of heavy industry and would be affected by any tariff barriers imposed.

== 20th century to present ==
=== 1900–1945 ===
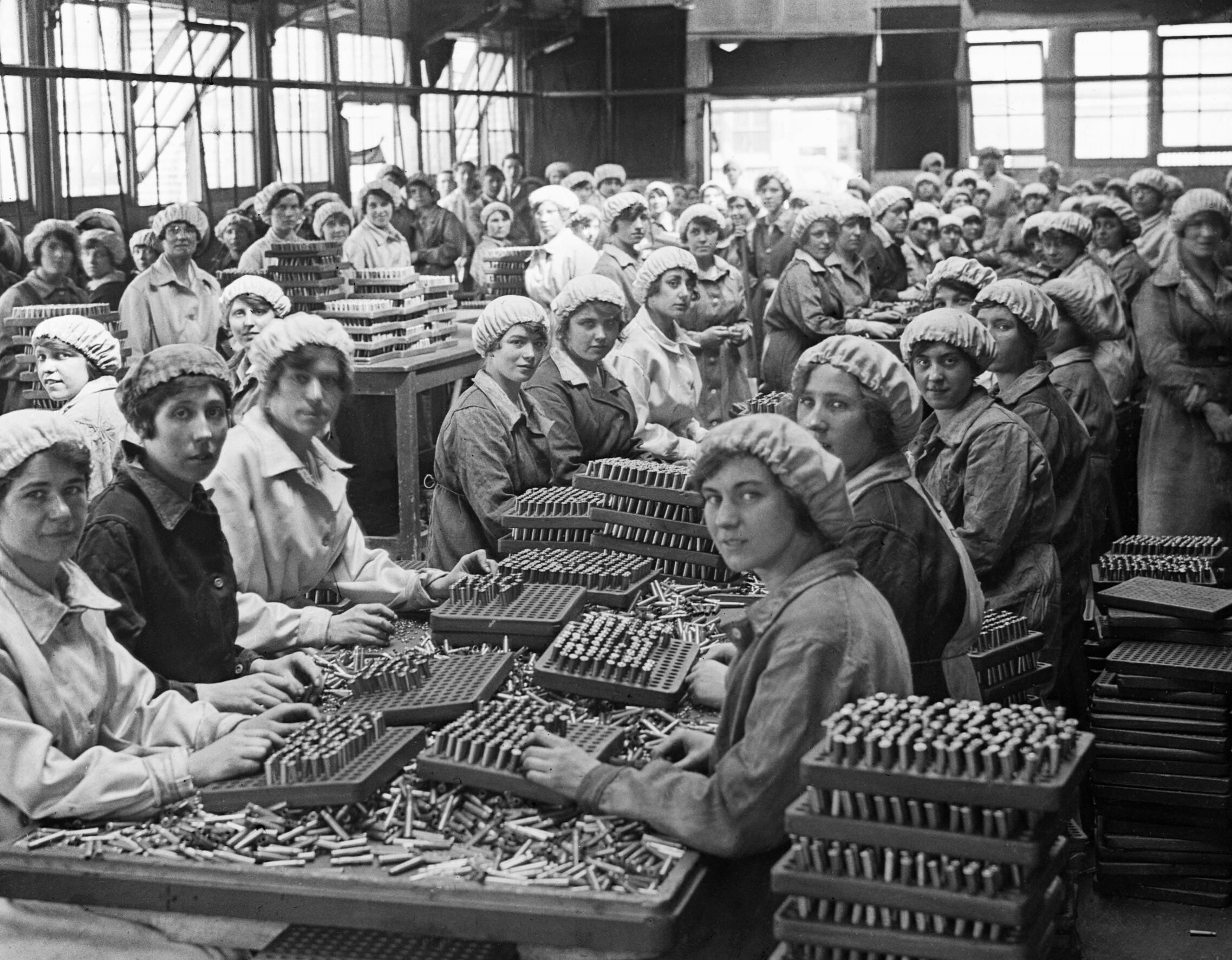
Munitionettes working at Woolwich Arsenal, London, May 1918

Queen Victoria, who had reigned since 1837, died in 1901 and was succeeded by her son, Edward VII, who, in turn, was succeeded by his son, George V, when he died in 1910. The British Empire flourished but there was a bitterly fought Second Boer War in South Africa. In 1914, Britain entered the First World War by declaring war on Germany. Nearly a million Britons were killed in the war, which lasted until Germany's surrender on 11 November 1918.

Home Rule in Ireland, which had been a major political issue since the late 19th century but put on hold by the war, was somewhat resolved after the Irish War of Independence brought the British Government to a stalemate in 1922. Negotiations led to the formation of the Irish Free State. However, in order to appease Unionists in the north, the north-eastern six counties remained as part of the U.K., forming Northern Ireland with its own Parliament at Stormont in Belfast.

Liberals were in power for much of the early 20th century under Prime Ministers Campbell-Bannerman, Asquith and Lloyd George. After 1914, the Liberal party suffered a sharp decline. The new Labour party, whose leader Ramsay MacDonald led two minority governments, swiftly became the Conservatives' main opposition, and Britain's largest party of the left.

King Edward VIII succeeded his father George V in January 1936, but was not allowed by the government to marry Wallis Simpson, a divorcee. In December, he abdicated in order to marry Simpson. His brother George VI was crowned king.

In order to avoid another European conflict, Prime Minister Neville Chamberlain attempted to appease German Chancellor Adolf Hitler, who was expanding his country's territory across Central Europe. Despite proclaiming that he has achieved "peace for our time", Britain declared war on Germany on 3 September 1939, following Hitler's invasion of Poland two days earlier. The U.K. thus joined the Allied forces in opposition to the Axis forces of Nazi Germany and Fascist Italy. For the first time, civilians were not exempt from the war, as London suffered nightly bombings during the Blitz. Much of London was destroyed, with 1,400,245 buildings destroyed or damaged. The only part of the British Isles to be occupied by enemy forces were the Channel Islands. At the war's end in 1945, however, the U.K. emerged as one of the victorious nations.

=== 1945–1997 ===
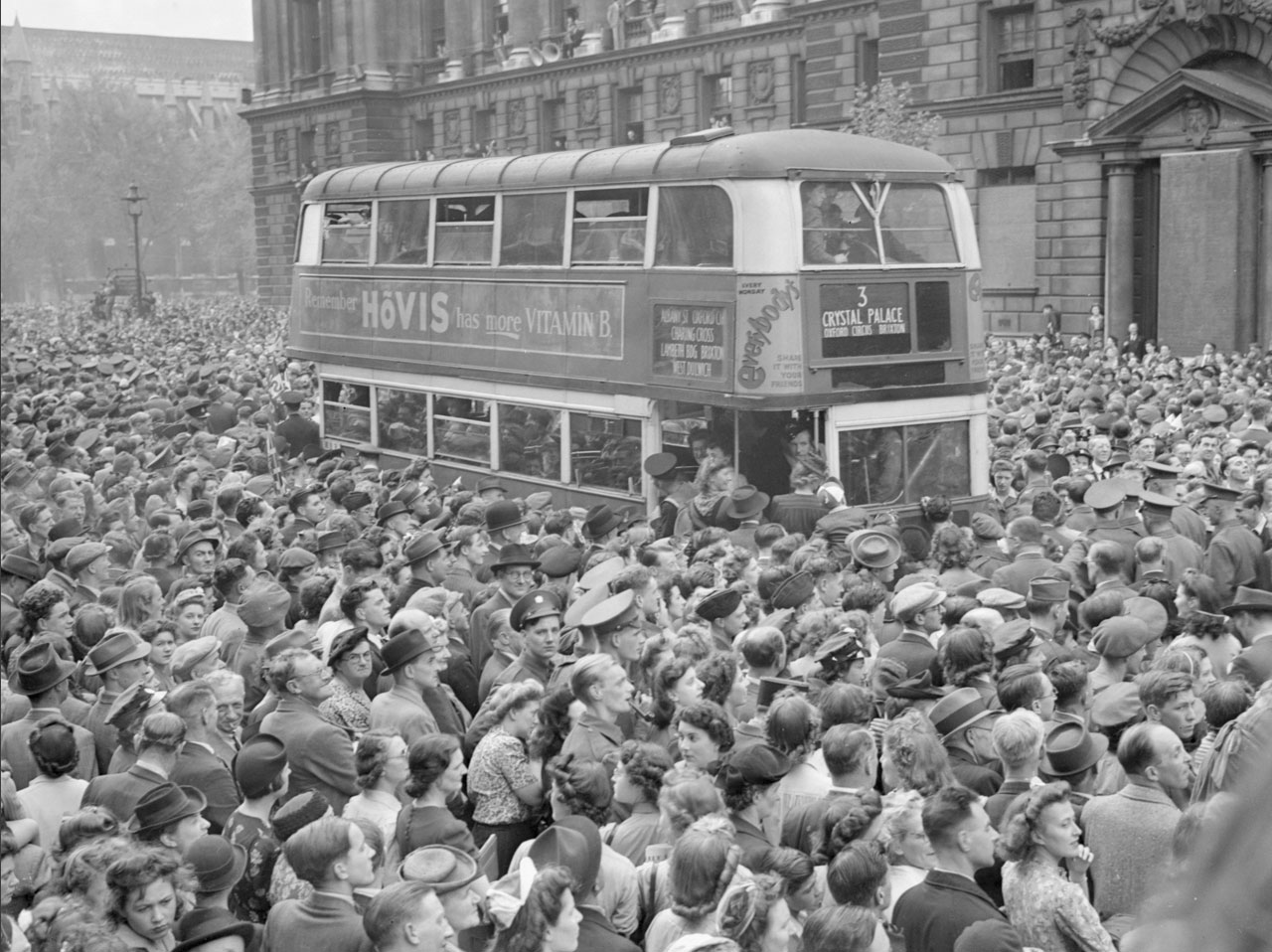
People gathered in Whitehall to hear Winston Churchill's victory speech and celebrate Victory in Europe, 8 May 1945.

Winston Churchill, who had been leader of the wartime coalition government, suffered a surprising landslide defeat to Clement Attlee's Labour party in 1945 elections. Attlee created a Welfare State in Britain, which most notably provided free healthcare under the National Health Service.

On the international stage, the second half of the 20th century was dominated by the Cold War between the Soviet Union and its socialist allies and the United States and its capitalist allies; the U.K. was a key supporter of the latter, joining the anti-Soviet military alliance NATO in 1949. During this period, the U.K. fought in the Korean War (1950–1953). The Cold War shaped world affairs until victory was achieved in 1989. The major parties largely agreed on foreign and domestic policy—except nationalization of some industries—in an era of Post-war consensus that lasted into the 1970s.

In 1951, Churchill and the Tories returned to power; they would govern uninterrupted for the next 13 years. King George VI died in 1952, and was succeeded by his eldest daughter, Elizabeth II, who reigned until her death on 8 September 2022. Churchill was succeeded in 1955 by Sir Anthony Eden, whose premiership was ruined by the Suez Crisis, in which Britain, France and Israel plotted to attack Egypt after its President Nasser nationalised the Suez Canal. Eden's successor, Harold Macmillan, split the Conservatives when Britain applied to join the European Economic Community, but French President Charles de Gaulle vetoed the application.

Labour returned to power in 1964 under Harold Wilson, who brought in a number of social reforms, including the legalisation of abortion, the abolition of capital punishment and the decriminalisation of homosexuality. In 1973, Conservative prime minister Edward Heath succeeded in securing U.K. membership in the European Economic Community (EEC), what would later become known as the European Union. Wilson, having lost the 1970 election to Heath, returned to power in 1974; however, Labour's reputation was harmed by the winter of discontent of 1978-9 under Jim Callaghan, which enabled the Conservatives to re-take control of Parliament in 1979, under Margaret Thatcher, Britain's first female prime minister.

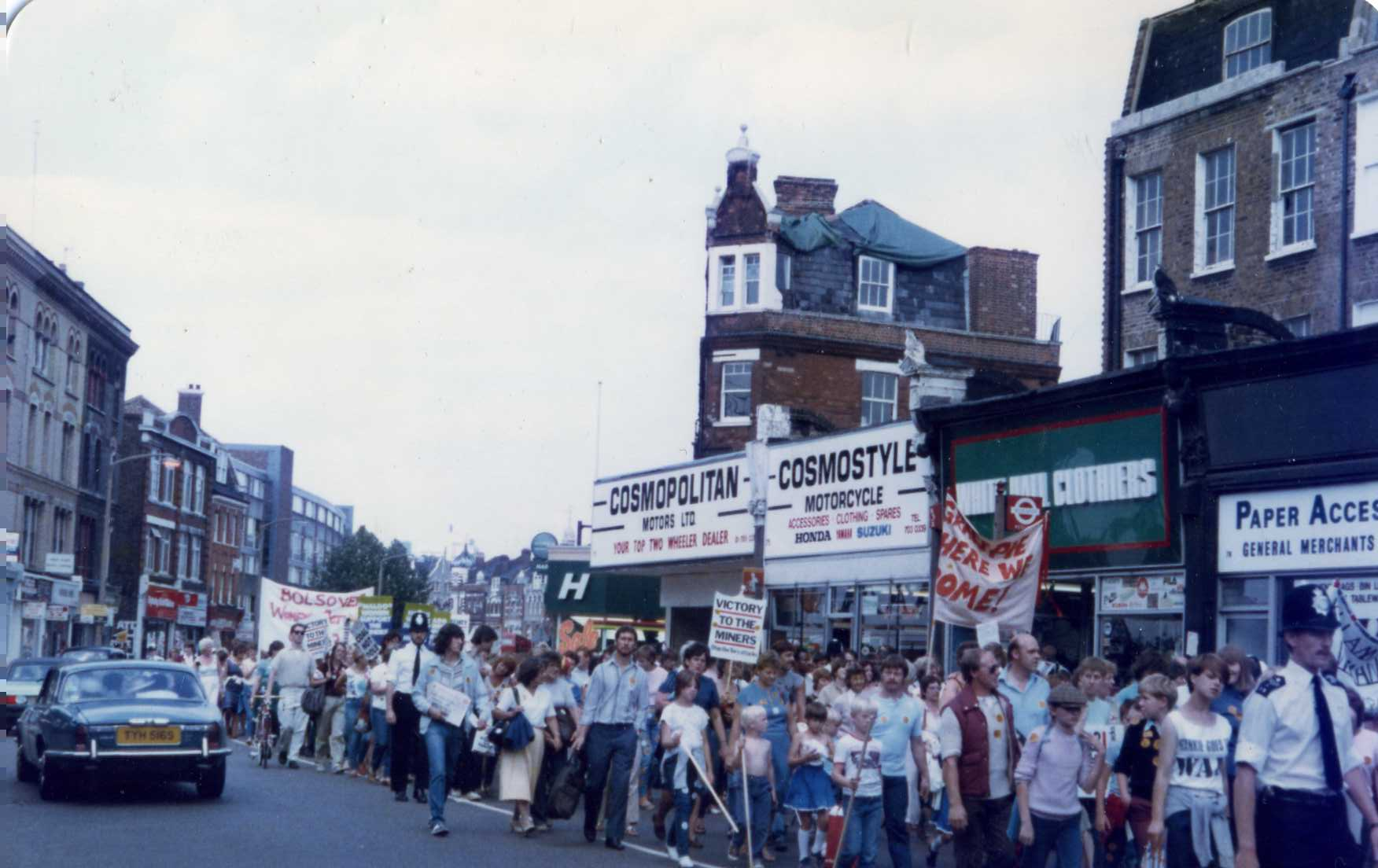
Support the Miners March, London, 1984

Although Thatcher's economic reforms made her initially unpopular, her decision in 1982 to retake the Falkland Islands from invading Argentine forces, in the Falklands War, changed her fortunes and enabled a landslide victory in 1983. After winning an unprecedented third election in 1987, however, Thatcher's popularity began to fade and she was replaced by her chancellor John Major in 1990.

Tensions between Protestants and Catholics in Northern Ireland came to a head in the late 1960s, when nationalist participants in a civil rights march were shot by members of the B Specials, a reserve police force manned almost exclusively by unionists. From this point the Provisional Irish Republican Army, also known as the Provos or simply the IRA, began a bombing campaign throughout the U.K., beginning a period known as The Troubles, which lasted until the late 1990s.

Prince Charles, the Prince of Wales and Elizabeth's eldest son married Lady Diana Spencer in 1981; the couple had two children, William and Harry, but divorced in 1992, during which year Prince Andrew and Princess Anne also separated from their spouses, leading the Queen to call the year her 'annus horribilis'. In 1997, Diana was killed in a car crash in Paris, leading to a mass outpouring of grief across the United Kingdom, and indeed the world.

=== 1997–present ===
In 1997, Tony Blair was elected prime minister in a landslide victory for the so-called 'New Labour', economically following 'Third Way' programmes. Blair won re-election in 2001 and 2005, before handing over power to his chancellor Gordon Brown in 2007. After a decade of prosperity both the U.K. and the Republic of Ireland were affected by the global recession, which began in 2008. In 2010, the Conservative party formed a coalition government with the Liberal Democrats, with Tory leader David Cameron as prime minister. In 2014, a referendum was held in Scotland on Scottish independence; the Scottish electorate voted to remain within the United Kingdom. In 2015 polling suggested a hung parliament was the most likely outcome in the General Election; however the Conservatives secured a slim majority.

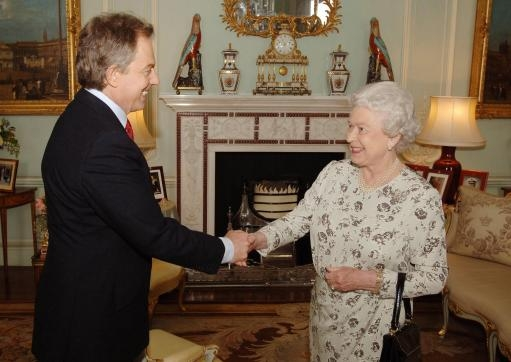
Queen Elizabeth II receiving Prime Minister Tony Blair after he won a third term in office on 6 May 2005

After the September 11 Attacks, the U.K. supported the U.S. in their "war on terror", and joined them in the War in Afghanistan (2001–2021) and the invasion of Iraq. London was attacked in July 2005. The U.K. also took a leading role in the 2011 military intervention in Libya. In a referendum in 2016, the UK voted to leave the European Union, which was done 31 January 2020. Negotiations between the UK and Ireland culminated in the controversial, threatened Northern Ireland Protocol, ratified January 2020 to create a de facto customs border along the Irish Sea to ensure uninterrupted trade between Northern Ireland and the Republic.

After becoming prime minister and leader of the Conservative Party shortly after David Cameron's resignation following the Brexit result, an election was called by Prime Minister Theresa May (the former Home Secretary), in an attempt to gain a larger majority for Brexit negotiations and also as an advantage, as the Labour Party were doing badly in the polls, the Conservative Party lost their majority despite winning a record number of votes, and were restricted to forming a "supply and confidence" deal, yet not a formal coalition with the Northern Irish unionist party, the DUP in order to have a working majority in the House of Commons.

Subsequent UK headlines focussed upon the calamitous Grenfell Tower fire that killed 72 in North Kensington on 14 June 2017, the deadliest structural fire in nearly three decades, which prompted an ongoing public inquiry; the novichok nerve agent poisoning of Russian double agent Sergei Skripal and his wife Yulia in Salisbury on 4 March 2018, raising diplomatic tensions between the UK and Russia; and May's authorisation of air strikes against Bashar al-Assad's Syria in the ongoing civil war. Concurrently, Ireland elected its first openly gay taoiseach Fine Gael's Leo Varadkar to replace the embattled Enda Kenny on 13 June 2017 in an unprecedented coalition with Fianna Fáil and the Greens; under Varadkar, GDP expanded some 8% in 2017 and 2018 before slowdowns in 2019 and then 2020.

May subsequently faced challenges to her premiership both within and without her party, surviving a vote of confidence in her leadership of the Conservative Party on 12 December 2018 by 200 MPs of the 159 votes required, and a motion of no confidence on 16 January 2019 by a margin of 19. May's Irish backstop plan to keep Northern Ireland partially in the EU single market until a deal was made was consistently defeated in the House, forcing her to postpone the UK's scheduled departure date. She resigned as party leader and Prime Minister 27 March; in the subsequent leadership election Boris Johnson (who served as foreign secretary in May's cabinet 2016–18) defeated Jeremy Hunt, was elected prime minister and secured the largest parliamentary majority in that December's general election since 1987, securing an 80-seat majority against Labour's Jeremy Corbyn, who would be replaced as Leader of the Opposition by Sir Keir Starmer 4 April 2020.

Under Johnson, Britain withdrew from the EU, and faced challenges, as did Ireland, from the ongoing COVID-19 pandemic, which forced the countries into many months lockdown, imposing social distancing and mask-wearing requirements as millions, including Johnson and incumbent taoiseach Micheál Martin, contracted coronavirus. The economy suffered greatly in both cases, but rebounded quickly; the two nations now face high inflation, economic cooldown and fears of recession. Negotiations after the 2020 Irish general election secured the aforementioned coalition 15 June 2020 largely against the democratic socialist Sinn Féin party, which became the second-largest party in the Dáil with 37 seats, the party's most since 1923. Martin became taoiseach 27 June, and Varadkar will return December 2022.,

Johnson was greatly damaged by a string of scandals between November 2021 and July 2022, including over his attendance earlier in the pandemic of numerous parties which flouted the government's own lockdown restrictions, a string of electoral defeats, controversy involving several Tory MPs, including Owen Paterson and Sir Geoffrey Cox, and his awareness of allegations of sexual misconduct against former chief whip Chris Pincher. Despite surviving a no-confidence vote 6 June by the slightest majority against any sitting Tory Prime Minister, 62 MPs resigned from government between 5–7 July, including Chancellor of the Exchequer Rishi Sunak and Health Secretary Sajid Javid, prompting his resignation the morning of 7 July. He was replaced as prime minister by Foreign Secretary Liz Truss 5 September, three days before the accession of King Charles III on the death of Queen Elizabeth II.

== Periods ==
- Prehistoric Britain (Prehistory–AD 43)
  - Prehistoric Scotland
  - Prehistoric Wales
- Roman Britain (44–407)
- Sub-Roman Britain (407–597)
- Britain in the Middle Ages (597–1485)
  - Anglo-Saxon England (597–1066)
  - Scotland in the Early Middle Ages (400–900)
  - Scotland in the High Middle Ages (900–1286)
  - Norman Conquest (1066)
  - Scotland in the Late Middle Ages (1286–1513)
    - Wars of Scottish Independence (1296–1357)
  - Wales in the Middle Ages (411-1542)
- Early modern Britain
  - Tudor period (1485–1603)
    - Tudor conquest of Ireland
    - English Renaissance
    - Elizabethan era (1558–1603)
  - First British Empire (1583–1783)
  - Jacobean era (1567–1625)
  - Union of the Crowns (1603)
  - Caroline era (1625–1642)
  - English Civil War (1642–1651)
  - English Interregnum (1651–1660)
  - Restoration (1660)
  - Glorious Revolution (1688)
  - Scottish Enlightenment
  - Kingdom of Great Britain (1707–1800)
  - Second British Empire (1783–1815)
  - Georgian era
- History of the United Kingdom (1801–)
  - United Kingdom of Great Britain and Ireland (1801–1922)
    - Britain's Imperial Century (1815–1914)
    - Regency (1811–1820)
    - Victorian era (1837–1901)
    - Edwardian period (1901–1910)
    - Britain in World War I (1914–1918)
    - Coalition Government 1916–1922
    - Irish War of Independence (1919–1921)
  - United Kingdom of Great Britain and Northern Ireland (1922–)
    - Britain in World War II (1939–1945)
    - History of the United Kingdom (1945–present)
- History of the Republic of Ireland (1922–)
  - Irish Civil War

== Timeline history of the British Isles ==
Date	States/Peoples										Relevant events
pre-6th c. BC	Prehistoric Britain, Prehistoric Ireland
6th–1st c. BC	British Iron Age, Iron Age tribes in Britain, Insular Celtic
6th–1st c. BC	Gauls		Brythons				Picts	Gaels
51 BC	Gallia Lugdunensis (Roman province)
43 AD	Gallia Lugdunensis (Roman province)		Britannia (Roman province)								Roman conquest of Britain
410	Brythons			Anglo-Saxon England	Hen Ogledd
638	Brythons			Anglo-Saxon England		Kingdom of Strathclyde					Viking raids
843	Brythons			Anglo-Saxon England		Kingdom of Strathclyde
845	Kingdom of Brittany			Anglo-Saxon England		Kingdom of Strathclyde
878	Kingdom of Brittany			Anglo-Saxon England	Danelaw	Kingdom of Strathclyde
911	Duchy of Normandy			Anglo-Saxon England	Danelaw	Kingdom of Strathclyde
927	Duchy of Normandy			Kingdom of England		Kingdom of Strathclyde
1054	Duchy of Normandy			Kingdom of England		Kingdom of Alba					Norman conquest of England
1079	Duchy of Normandy			Kingdom of England		Kingdom of Alba		Kingdom of Mann and the Isles
1098	Duchy of Normandy		Cymru	Kingdom of England			Kingdom of Norway	Kingdom of Mann and the Isles			Anglo-Norman invasion of Ireland
1171	Duchy of Normandy		Cymru	Kingdom of England			Kingdom of Norway	Kingdom of Mann and the Isles	Lordship of Ireland
1204			Cymru	Kingdom of England			Kingdom of Norway	Kingdom of Mann and the Isles	Lordship of Ireland		Magna Carta; Treaty of York
1266			Cymru	Kingdom of England			Kingdom of Norway		Lordship of Ireland
1282							Kingdom of Norway		Lordship of Ireland		Wars of Scottish Independence
1333	Bailiwick of Guernsey	Bailiwick of Jersey	Isle of Man				Kingdom of Norway		Lordship of Ireland
1469	Bailiwick of Guernsey	Bailiwick of Jersey	Isle of Man			Kingdom of Scotland			Lordship of Ireland		Poynings' Law
1541	Bailiwick of Guernsey	Bailiwick of Jersey	Isle of Man			Kingdom of Scotland					Scottish Reformation; Tudor conquest of Ireland; Union of the Crowns
1607	Bailiwick of Guernsey	Bailiwick of Jersey	Isle of Man			Kingdom of Scotland			Kingdom of Ireland		Flight of the Earls; Plantation of Ulster; Wars of the Three Kingdoms
1641	Bailiwick of Guernsey	Bailiwick of Jersey	Isle of Man			Kingdom of Scotland				Confederate Ireland
1649	Bailiwick of Guernsey	Bailiwick of Jersey	Isle of Man	Commonwealth of England		Kingdom of Scotland				Confederate Ireland	Cromwellian conquest of Ireland
1653	Bailiwick of Guernsey	Bailiwick of Jersey	Isle of Man	Commonwealth of England, Scotland and Ireland
1660	Bailiwick of Guernsey	Bailiwick of Jersey	Isle of Man	Kingdom of England		Kingdom of Scotland			Kingdom of Ireland		Penal Laws; Revolution of 1688; Battle of the Boyne
1707	Bailiwick of Guernsey	Bailiwick of Jersey	Isle of Man	Kingdom of Great Britain					Kingdom of Ireland		Acts of Union 1707; Battle of Culloden; Irish Rebellion of 1798
1801	Bailiwick of Guernsey	Bailiwick of Jersey	Isle of Man	United Kingdom of Great Britain and Ireland							Acts of Union 1800; Catholic emancipation Great Famine of Ireland
1919	Bailiwick of Guernsey	Bailiwick of Jersey	Isle of Man	United Kingdom of Great Britain and Ireland						Irish Republic	Irish War of Independence; Partition of Ireland
1921/1922	Bailiwick of Guernsey	Bailiwick of Jersey	Isle of Man	United Kingdom of Great Britain and Northern Ireland					(Northern Ireland)	Irish Free State
1937	Bailiwick of Guernsey	Bailiwick of Jersey	Isle of Man	United Kingdom of Great Britain and Northern Ireland					(Northern Ireland)	Ireland	The Emergency; Battle of Britain; The Troubles; Celtic Tiger
1999	Bailiwick of Guernsey	Bailiwick of Jersey	Isle of Man	(Wales)	(England)	(Scotland)			(Northern Ireland)	Ireland	Devolution; Good Friday Agreement

== Geographic ==
- History of England (Timeline)
  - History of Cornwall
  - History of London
- History of Scotland
- History of Wales
- History of Ireland
  - History of Northern Ireland
  - History of the Republic of Ireland (Timeline)
- History of the Isle of Man
- History of Jersey

=== States ===
- England in the Middle Ages
- Kingdom of England (to 1707)
- Kingdom of Scotland (to 1707)
- Kingdom of Ireland (1541–1801)
- Kingdom of Great Britain (1707–1801)
- United Kingdom of Great Britain and Ireland (1801–1927)
- United Kingdom of Great Britain and Northern Ireland (1927 – )
- Isle of Man (unrecorded date to present)

=== Supranational ===
- British Empire
- Commonwealth of Nations
- European Union

== See also ==
- Timeline of the British Army
- Timeline of British diplomatic history
- British military history
- List of British monarchs
  - British monarchs' family tree
- Economic history of the United Kingdom
- History of British society
- Outline of the History of the British Isles
