= Eóganan mac Óengusa =

King of the Picts from 837 to 839

King of the Picts
- Reign: 837–839
- Predecessor: Drest IX
- Successor: Uurad
- Died: 839
- House: Óengus
- Father: Óengusa

Uuen son of Onuist (Old Irish: Eogán mac Óengusa; died 839), commonly referred to by the hypocoristic Eóganán, was king of the Picts between A.D. 837–839.

== Life ==
Uuen was a son of Onuist II [son of] Uurguist [Wrguist] (in Gaelic: Óengus II mac Fergusa (Óengus II), died 834) and succeeded his cousin Drest mac Caustantín (Drest IX) as king in 837. The sole notice of Uuen in the Irish annals is the report of his death, together with his brother Bran and "Áed mac Boanta, and others almost innumerable" in a battle of 839 fought by the men of Fortriu against Vikings in 839. This defeat appears to have ended the century-long domination of Pictland by the descendants of Onuist I [son of] Wrguist (in Gaelic: Óengus I mac Fergusa).

If the annalistic record is short, there are other traditions relating to Uuen. He is named by the St Andrews foundation tale as one of the sons of Onuist who met with Saint Regulus at Forteviot when the Saint supposedly brought the relics of Saint Andrew to Scotland. Along with his uncle Caustantín, Uuen appears to have been a patron of the Northumbrian monasteries as he is named in the Liber Vitae Dunelmensis, which contains a list of those for whom prayers were said, dating from around 840.

Uuen, his father, his uncle and his cousin Domnall appear in the Duan Albanach, a praise poem from the reign of Máel Coluim (III) mac Donnchada listing Máel Coluim's predecessors as kings of Scots, of Alba and of Dál Riata from Fergus Mór and his brothers onwards. Their inclusion in this source and its like is thought to be due to their importance to the foundation traditions of Dunkeld and St Andrews.

On death of Uuen, the Pictish Chronicle king lists have him followed by the short reigns of Uurad (Ferat) and Uurad's sons Bridei, Cináed and Drest, by Bridei son of Fochel (Uuthoil) and by Cináed mac Ailpín (Ciniod [son of] Elphin), the eventual victor and founder of a new ruling clan.

== See also ==
- House of Óengus

== Sources ==
- Anderson, Alan Orr; Early Sources of Scottish History A.D. 500–1286, volume 1. Reprinted with corrections, Stamford: Paul Watkins, 1990. ISBN 1-871615-03-8
- Broun, Dauvit; "Pictish Kings 761–839: Integration with Dál Riata or Separate Development" in Sally Foster (ed.), The St Andrews Sarcophagus: A Pictish masterpiece and its international connections. Dublin: Four Courts Press, 1998. ISBN 1-85182-414-6
- Clancy, Thomas Owen; "Caustantín son of Fergus (Uurgust)" in M. Lynch (ed.) The Oxford Companion to Scottish History, Oxford and New York: Oxford University Press, 2002. ISBN 0-19-211696-7
- Forsyth, Katherine; "Evidence of a lost Pictish source in the Historia Regum Anglorum of Symeon of Durham", in Simon Taylor (ed.) Kings, clerics and chronicles in Scotland, 500–1297: essays in honour of Marjorie Ogilvie Anderson on the occasion of her ninetieth birthday. Dublin: Four Courts Press, 2000. ISBN 1-85182-516-9
- Smyth, Alfred P.; Warlords and Holy Men: Scotland A.D. 80–1000, Reprinted, Edinburgh: Edinburgh University Press, 1998. ISBN 0-7486-0100-7

Regnal titles
Preceded by Drest IX	King of the Picts; 837–839	Succeeded by Uurad
