= Kingdom of Scotland =

Sovereign state in Europe (843–1707)

Coordinates: 57°N 4°W

Kingdom of Scotland Rìoghachd na h-Alba (Scottish Gaelic) Kinrick o Scotland (Scots) Kongungdum Skotland (Norn)
- 843–1707 (1654–1660: Commonwealth)
- Top: Flag (1542–1707); Bottom: Royal Banner (1565–1603) Royal Arms (1565–1603)
- Motto: "In my defens God me defend" (Scots); "In my defence God defend me"; (Note: 'In Defens' is written, which is an abbreviation of 'In my defens God me defend', the motto of the King of Scotland. A thistle, Scotland's national flower, is planted, and below it is written in Latin, Latin: 'Nemo me impune lacessit' (There is no one who harms me and goes unpunished), the motto of the King of Scotland and the motto of the Order of the Thistle.)
- The Kingdom of Scotland in 1190
- Capital: Scone (c. 843–1069); Dunfermline (c. 1069–1452); Edinburgh (after c. 1452)
- Common languages: Middle Irish (until 12th century); Scottish Gaelic (from 12th century); Cumbric (1093 – 12th century) (Note: The Pictish and Cumbric languages became extinct during the 10th and 11th centuries.); English (Note: Old English (950–1066), Middle English (1066–1550), Modern English (1550–1707). Overall, English began to have increased influence in Scotland from the mid-16th century.) (950–1707); Scots (Note: Old English (until 1066), Middle English (1066–13th century), Early Scots (13th century–1450), Middle Scots (from 1450)) (from 13th century); Flemish (in the cities; 12th century); French (11th-15th centuries) (Note: Became the chief language of governance in the eleventh and twelfth centuries and was widely spoken in Scotland at the height of the Auld Alliance.); Norn (from 1471); Medieval Latin (Note: Widely used for administrative and liturgical purposes.) (until 15th century)
- Religion: Roman Catholicism (until 1560); Church of Scotland (Episcopalianism, Presbyterianism; from 1560)
- Demonym: Scottish
- Government: Unitary parliamentary semi-constitutional monarchy
- Monarch
  - 843–858 (first): Kenneth I
  - 1702–1707 (last): Anne
- Legislature: Parliament
- Historical era: Middle Ages, Early modern
  - United: 9th century (traditionally 843)
  - Lothian and Strathclyde incorporated: 1124 (confirmed Treaty of York 1237)
  - Galloway incorporated: 1234/1235
  - Hebrides, Isle of Man and Caithness incorporated: 1266 (Treaty of Perth)
  - Orkney and Shetland incorporated: 1472
  - Union of the Crowns: 24 March 1603
  - Union with England: 1 May 1707

Area
- 1482–1707: 78,778 km^{2} (30,416 sq mi)

Population
  - 1500: 500,000
  - 1600: 800,000
  - 1700: 1,250,000
- Currency: Pound Scots
Preceded by
| Dál Riata |
| Cat |
| Ce |
| Fortriu |
| Fib |
| Strathclyde |
| Galloway |
| Northumbria |
| Earldom of Orkney |
Succeeded by
| Kingdom of Great Britain |
- Today part of: United Kingdom; Scotland; England; (Northumberland, Cumbria, partially)

The Kingdom of Scotland (Note: Scottish Gaelic: Rìoghachd na h-Alba; Scots: Kinrick o Scotland; Norn: Kongungdum Skotland) was a sovereign state in northwest Europe, traditionally said to have been founded in 843. Its territories expanded and shrank, but it came to occupy the northern third of the island of Great Britain, sharing a land border to the south with the Kingdom of England. During the Middle Ages, Scotland engaged in intermittent conflict with England, most prominently the Wars of Scottish Independence, which saw the Scots maintain and assert their independence from the English. Following Scotland's annexation of the Hebrides and the Northern Isles from Norway in 1266 and 1472 respectively, and England's capture of Berwick in 1482, the territory of the Kingdom of Scotland corresponded to that of modern-day Scotland, bounded by the North Sea to the east, the Atlantic Ocean to the north and west, and the North Channel and Irish Sea to the southwest.

In 1603, James VI of Scotland became King of England, forming a personal union between Scotland and England. In 1707, during the reign of Queen Anne, the two kingdoms were united to form the Kingdom of Great Britain under the terms of the Acts of Union. The Crown was the most important element of Scotland's government. The Scottish monarchy in the Middle Ages was a largely itinerant institution, before Edinburgh developed as a capital city in the second half of the 15th century. The Crown remained at the centre of political life and in the 16th century emerged as a major centre of display and artistic patronage, until it was effectively dissolved with the 1603 Union of Crowns. The Scottish Crown adopted the conventional offices of western European monarchical states of the time and developed a Privy Council and great offices of state. Parliament also emerged as a major legal institution, gaining an oversight of taxation and policy, but was never as central to the national life. In the early period, the kings of the Scots depended on the great lords—the mormaers and toísechs—but from the reign of David I, sheriffdoms were introduced, which allowed more direct control and gradually limited the power of the major lordships.

In the 17th century, the creation of Justices of Peace and Commissioners of Supply helped to increase the effectiveness of local government. The continued existence of courts baron and the introduction of kirk sessions helped consolidate the power of local lairds. Scots law developed in the Middle Ages and was reformed and codified in the 16th and 17th centuries. Under James IV the legal functions of the council were rationalised, with Court of Session meeting daily in Edinburgh. In 1532, the College of Justice was founded, leading to the training and professionalisation of lawyers. David I is the first Scottish king known to have produced his own coinage. After the union of the Scottish and English crowns in 1603, the Pound Scots was reformed to closely match sterling coin. The Bank of Scotland issued pound notes from 1704. Scottish currency was abolished by the Acts of Union 1707; however, Scotland has retained unique banknotes to the present day.

Geographically, Scotland is divided between the Highlands and Islands and the Lowlands. The Highlands had a relatively short growing season, which was even shorter during the Little Ice Age. Scotland's population at the start of the Black Death was about 1 million; by the end of the plague, it was only half a million. It expanded in the first half of the 16th century, reaching roughly 1.2 million by the 1690s. Significant languages in the medieval kingdom included Gaelic, Old English, Norse and French; but by the early modern era Middle Scots had begun to dominate. Christianity was introduced into Scotland from the 6th century. In the Norman period the Scottish church underwent a series of changes that led to new monastic orders and organisation. During the 16th century, Scotland underwent a Protestant Reformation that created a predominately Calvinist national kirk. There were a series of religious controversies that resulted in divisions and persecutions. The Scottish Crown developed naval forces at various points in its history, but often relied on privateers and fought a guerre de course. Land forces centred around the large common army, but adopted European innovations from the 16th century; and many Scots took service as mercenaries and as soldiers for the English Crown.

== History ==
=== Origins: 400–943 ===
From the 5th century on, north Britain was divided into a series of petty kingdoms. Of these, the four most important were those of the Picts in the north-east, the Scots of Dál Riata in the west, the Britons of Strathclyde in the south-west and the Anglian kingdom of Bernicia (which united with Deira to form Northumbria in 653) in the south-east, stretching into modern northern England.

In 793, ferocious Viking raids began on monasteries such as those at Iona and Lindisfarne, creating fear and confusion across the kingdoms of north Britain. Orkney, Shetland and the Western Isles eventually fell to the Norsemen. In a decisive battle in 839, the king of the Picts, Uuen, and the king of Dál Riata, Áed, were killed by Vikings. This led to a period of instability, which culminated in the rise of Cínaed mac Ailpín (Kenneth MacAlpin) as "king of the Picts" in the 840s (traditionally dated to 843), and brought to power the House of Alpin.

Under the House of Alpin, there was a long-term process of Gaelicisation of the Pictish kingdoms, which adopted Gaelic language and customs. There was also a merger of the Gaelic (Scots) and Pictish kingdoms, although historians debate whether it was a Pictish takeover of Dál Riata, or vice-versa. When he died as king of the combined kingdom in 900, one of Kenneth's successors, Domnall II (Donald II), was the first man to be called rí Alban (King of Alba). The Latin term Scotia would increasingly be used to describe the heartland of these kings, north of the River Forth, and eventually the entire area controlled by its kings would be referred to, in English, as Scotland. The long reign (900–942/3) of Donald's successor Causantín (Constantine II) is often regarded as the key to formation of the Kingdom of Alba/Scotland, and he was later credited with bringing Scottish Christianity into conformity with the Catholic Church.

=== Expansion: 943–1513 ===
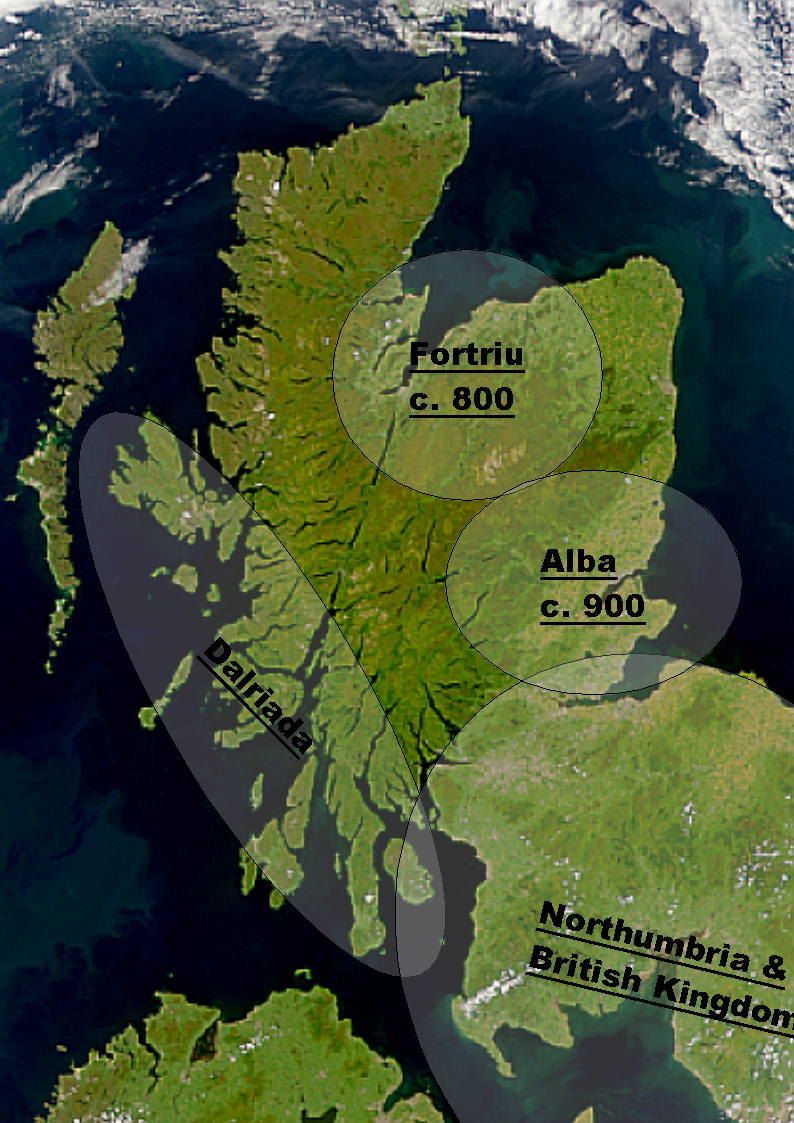
Major political centres in early Medieval Scotland

Máel Coluim I (Malcolm I) (r. c. 943–954) is believed to have annexed the Kingdom of Strathclyde, over which the kings of Alba had probably exercised some authority since the later 9th century. His successor, Indulf the Aggressor, was described as the King of Strathclyde before inheriting the throne of Alba; he is credited with later annexing parts of Lothian, including Edinburgh, from the Kingdom of Northumbria. The reign of David I has been characterised as a "Davidian Revolution", in which he introduced a system of feudal land tenure, established the first royal burghs in Scotland and the first recorded Scottish coinage, and continued a process of religious and legal reforms.

Until the 13th century, the border with England was very fluid, with Northumbria being annexed to Scotland by David I, but lost under his grandson and successor Malcolm IV in 1157. The Treaty of York (1237) fixed the boundaries with England close to the modern border.

By the reign of Alexander III, the Scots had annexed the remainder of the Norwegian-held western seaboard after the stalemate of the Battle of Largs and the Treaty of Perth in 1266. The Isle of Man fell under English control, from Norwegian, in the 14th century, despite several attempts to seize it for Scotland.

The English briefly occupied most of Scotland, under Edward I. Under Edward III, the English backed Edward Balliol, son of King John Balliol, in an attempt to gain his father's throne and restore the lands of the Scottish lords dispossessed by Robert I and his successors in the 14th century in the Wars of Independence (1296–1357). The king of France attempted to thwart the exercise, under the terms of what became known as the Auld Alliance, which provided for mutual aid against the English.

In the 15th and early 16th centuries, under the Stewart Dynasty, despite a turbulent political history, the Crown gained greater political control at the expense of independent lords and regained most of its lost territory to around the modern borders of the country. The dowry of the Orkney and Shetland Islands, by the Norwegian crown, in 1468 was the last great land acquisition for the kingdom. In 1482 the border fortress of Berwick—the largest port in medieval Scotland—fell to the English once again; this was the last time it changed hands. The Auld Alliance with France committed Scotland to action in the War of the League of Cambrai, resulting in the heavy defeat of a Scottish army at the Battle of Flodden Field in 1513 and the death of the King James IV. A long period of political instability followed.

=== Consolidation: 1513–1690 ===
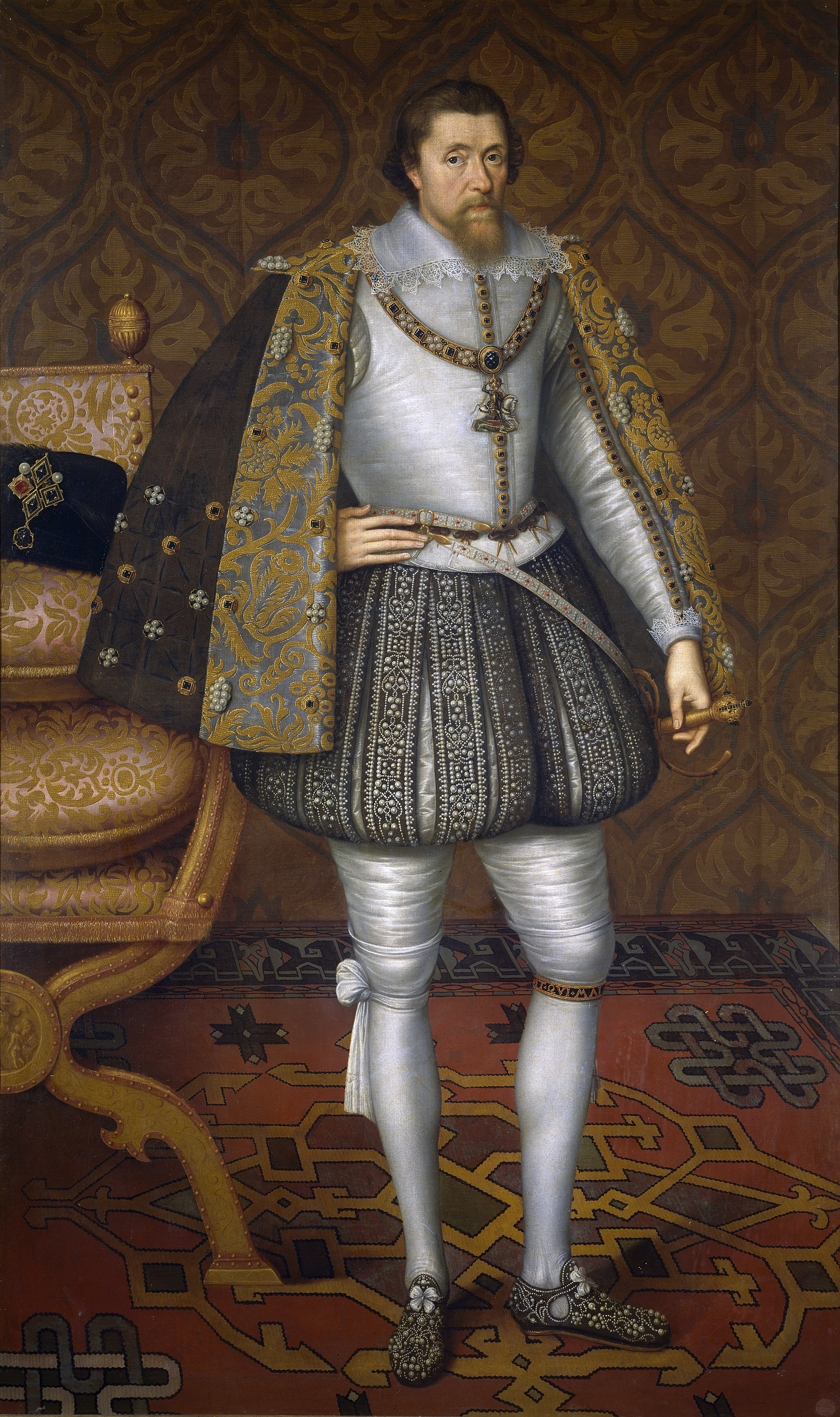
James VI, whose inheritance of the thrones of England and Ireland created a dynastic union in 1603

In the 16th century, under James V of Scotland and Mary, Queen of Scots, the Crown and court took on many of the attributes of the Renaissance and New Monarchy, despite long royal minorities, civil wars and interventions by the English and French. In the mid-16th century, the Scottish Reformation was strongly influenced by Calvinism, leading to widespread iconoclasm and the introduction of a Presbyterian system of organisation and discipline that would have a major impact on Scottish life.

In the late 16th century, James VI emerged as a major intellectual figure with considerable authority over the kingdom. In 1603, he inherited the thrones of England and Ireland from his childless cousin, Elizabeth I, creating a Union of the Crowns that left the three states with their separate identities and institutions. He also moved the centre of royal patronage and power to London.

When James' son Charles I attempted to impose elements of the English religious settlement on Scotland, the result was the Bishops' Wars (1637–1640), which ended in defeat for the king and a virtually independent Presbyterian Covenanter state in Scotland. It also helped precipitate the Wars of the Three Kingdoms, during which the Scots carried out major military interventions.

After Charles I's defeat, the Scots backed the king in the Second English Civil War; after his execution, they proclaimed his son Charles II king, resulting in the Anglo-Scottish War of 1650–1652 against the emerging republican regime of Parliamentarians in England led by Oliver Cromwell. The results were a series of defeats and the short-lived incorporation of Scotland into the Commonwealth of England, Scotland and Ireland (1653–1660).

After the 1660 restoration of the monarchy, Scotland regained its separate status and institutions, while the centre of political power remained in London. After the Glorious Revolution of 1688–1689, in which James VII was deposed by his daughter Mary and her husband William of Orange in England, Scotland accepted them under the Claim of Right Act 1689, but the deposed main hereditary line of the Stuarts became a focus for political discontent known as Jacobitism, leading to a series of invasions and rebellions mainly focused on the Scottish Highlands.

=== Treaty of Union: 1690–1707 ===
After severe economic dislocation in the 1690s, there were moves that led to political union with England as the Kingdom of Great Britain, which came into force on 1 May 1707. The English and Scottish parliaments were replaced by a combined Parliament of Great Britain, which sat in Westminster and largely continued English traditions without interruption. Forty-five Scots were added to the 513 members of the House of Commons and 16 Scots to the 190 members of the House of Lords. It was also a full economic union, replacing the Scottish systems of currency, taxation and laws regulating trade.

== Politics and governance ==
=== Government ===
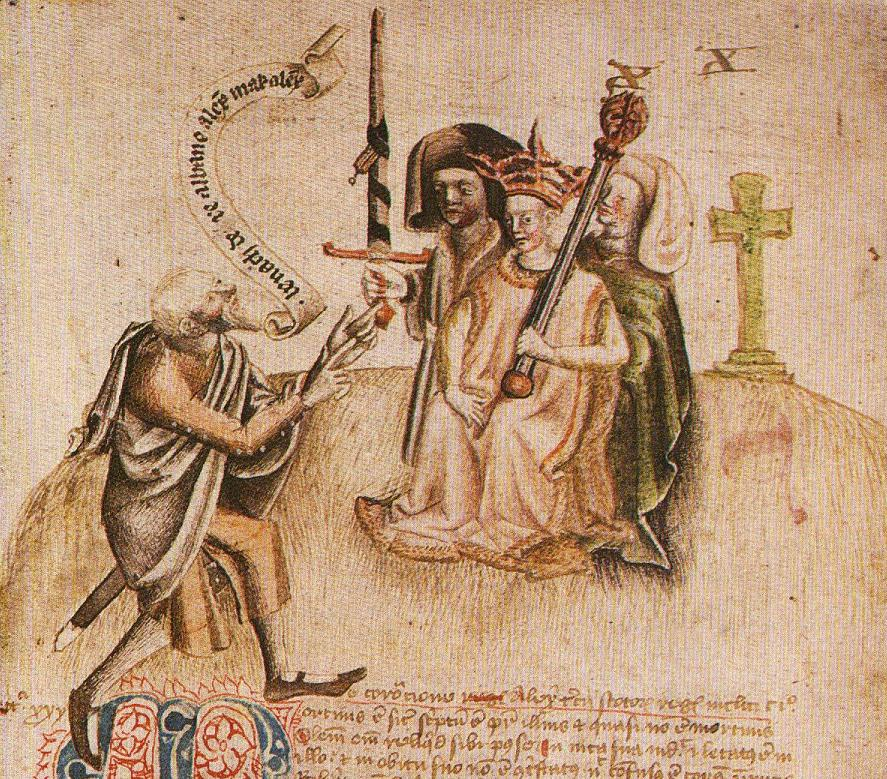
Coronation of Alexander III of Scotland at Scone Abbey; beside him are the Mormaers of Strathearn and Fife while his genealogy is recited by a royal poet.

The unified kingdom of Alba retained some of the ritual aspects of Pictish and Scottish kingship. These can be seen in the elaborate ritual coronation at the Stone of Scone at Scone Abbey. While the Scottish monarchy in the Middle Ages was a largely itinerant institution, Scone remained one of its most important locations, with royal castles at Stirling and Perth becoming significant in the later Middle Ages before Edinburgh developed as a capital city in the second half of the 15th century.

The Crown remained the most important element of government, despite the many royal minorities. In the late Middle Ages, it saw much of the aggrandisement associated with the New Monarchs elsewhere in Europe. Theories of constitutional monarchy and resistance were articulated by Scots, particularly George Buchanan, in the 16th century, but James VI of Scotland advanced the theory of the divine right of kings, and these debates were restated in subsequent reigns and crises. The court remained at the centre of political life, and in the 16th century emerged as a major centre of display and artistic patronage, until it was effectively dissolved with the Union of the Crowns in 1603. The Privy Council of Scotland was the body that advised the Scottish monarch. During its existence, the Privy Council of Scotland was essentially considered as the government of the Kingdom of Scotland and was seen as the most important element of central government.

In the range of its functions the council was often more important than the Estates in the running the country. Its registers include a wide range of material on the political, administrative, economic and social affairs of the country. The council supervised the administration of the law, regulated trade and shipping, took emergency measures against the plague, granted licences to travel, administered oaths of allegiance, banished beggars and gypsies, dealt with witches, recusants, Covenanters and Jacobites and tackled the problem of lawlessness in the Highlands and the Borders.

The Scottish Crown adopted the conventional offices of western European courts, including High Steward, Chamberlain, Lord High Constable, Earl Marischal and Lord Chancellor. The King's Council emerged as a full-time body in the 15th century, increasingly dominated by laymen and critical to the administration of justice. The Privy Council, which developed in the mid-16th century, and the great offices of state, including the chancellor, secretary and treasurer, remained central to the administration of the government, even after the departure of the Stuart monarchs to rule in England from 1603. However, it was often sidelined and was abolished after the Acts of Union 1707, with rule direct from London.

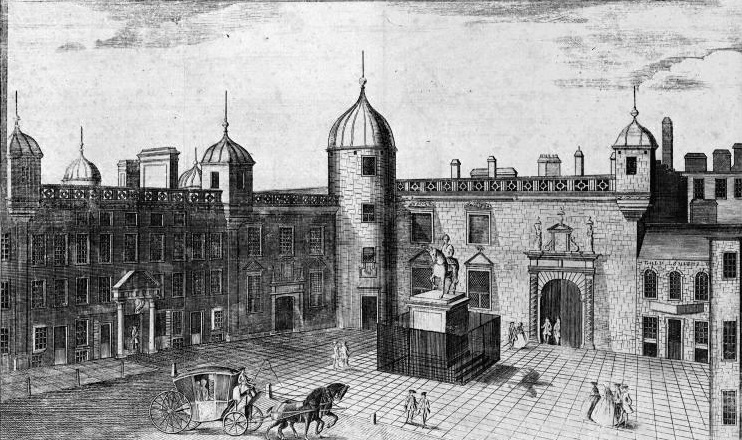
The Parliament of Scotland, also known as the Estates of Scotland, at Parliament House, Edinburgh

The Parliament of Scotland also emerged as a major legal institution, gaining an oversight of taxation and policy. By the end of the Middle Ages it was sitting almost every year, partly because of the frequent royal minorities and regencies of the period, which may have prevented it from being sidelined by the monarchy. In the early modern era, Parliament was also vital to the running of the country, providing laws and taxation, but it had fluctuating fortunes and was never as central to the national life as its counterpart in England.

In the early period, the kings of the Scots depended on the great lords known as the mormaers (later earls) and toísechs (later thanes), but from the reign of David I, sheriffdoms were introduced, which allowed more direct control and gradually limited the power of the major lordships. In the 17th century, the creation of justices of the peace and the Commissioner of Supply helped to increase the effectiveness of local government. The continued existence of courts baron and introduction of kirk sessions helped consolidate the power of local lairds.

=== Law and legal system ===
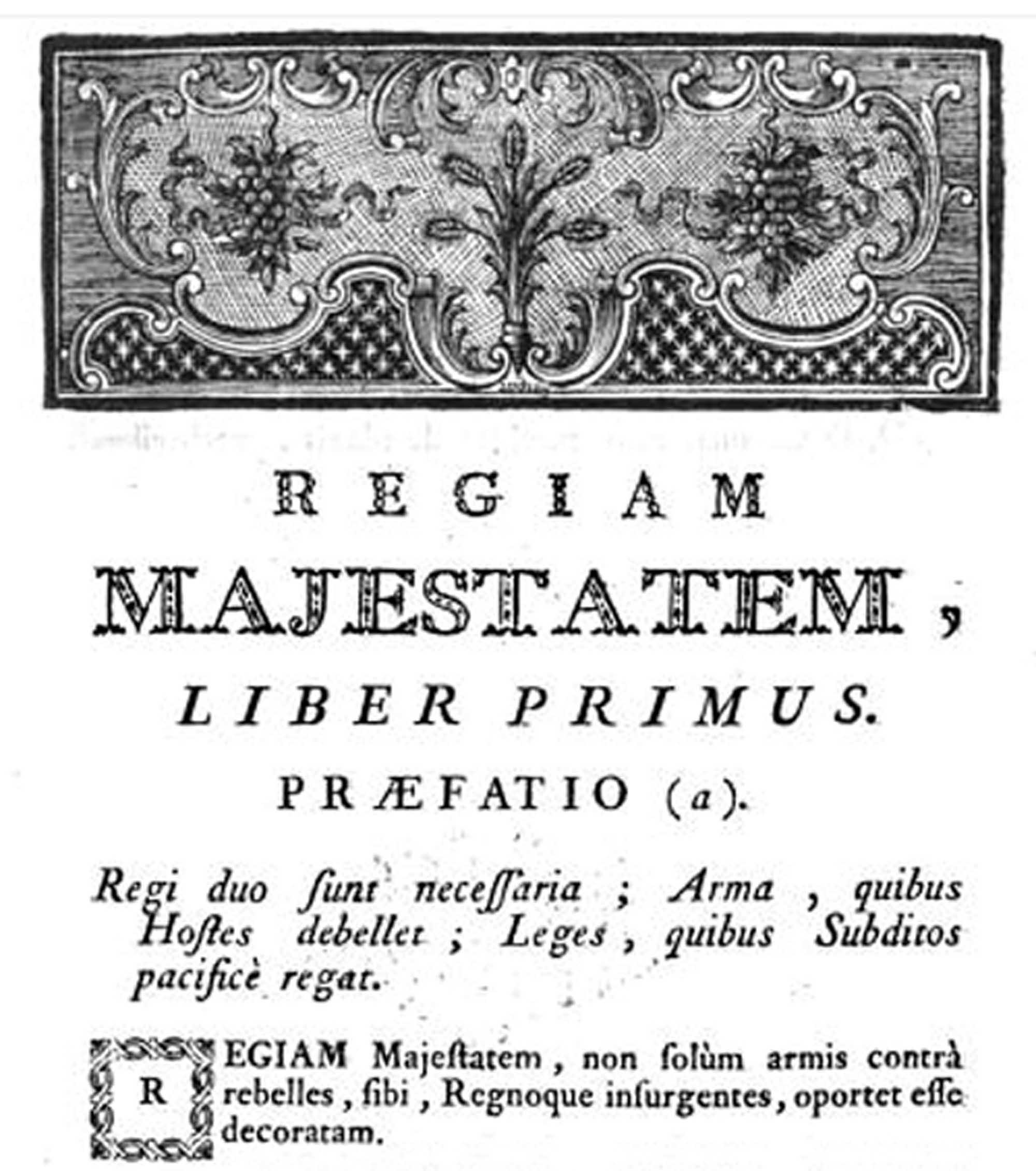
The Regiam Majestatem is the oldest surviving written digest of Scots law.

Scots law developed into a distinctive system in the Middle Ages and was reformed and codified in the 16th and 17th centuries. Knowledge of the nature of Scots law before the 11th century is largely speculative, but it was probably a mixture of legal traditions representing the different cultures inhabiting the land at the time, including Celtic, Britonnic, Irish and Anglo-Saxon customs. The legal tract, the Leges inter Brettos et Scottos, set out a system of compensation for injury and death based on ranks and the solidarity of kin groups. There were popular courts or comhdhails, indicated by dozens of place names in eastern Scotland. In Scandinavian-held areas, Udal law formed the basis of the legal system and it is known that the Hebrides were taxed using the Ounceland measure. Althings were open-air governmental assemblies that met in the presence of the Jarl and the meetings were open to virtually all "free men". At these sessions decisions were made, laws passed and complaints adjudicated.

The introduction of feudalism in the reign of David I of Scotland would have a profound impact on the development of Scottish law, establishing feudal land tenure over many parts of the south and east that eventually spread northward. Sheriffs, originally appointed by the King as royal administrators and tax collectors, developed legal functions. Feudal lords also held courts to adjudicate disputes between their tenants.

By the 14th century, some of these feudal courts had developed into "petty kingdoms" where the King's courts did not have authority except for cases of treason. Burghs also had their local laws dealing mostly with commercial and trade matters and may have become similar in function to sheriff's courts. Ecclesiastical courts had exclusive jurisdiction over matters such as marriage, contracts made on oath, inheritance and legitimacy. Judices were often royal officials who supervised baronial, abbatial and other lower-ranking "courts". However, the main official of law in the post-Davidian Kingdom of the Scots was the Justiciar, who held courts and reported to the king personally. Normally, there were two Justiciarships, organised by linguistic boundaries: the Justiciar of Scotia and the Justiciar of Lothian, but sometimes Galloway also had its own Justiciar. Scottish common law, the jus commune, began to take shape at the end of the period, assimilating Gaelic and Britonnic law with practices from Anglo-Norman England and the Continent.

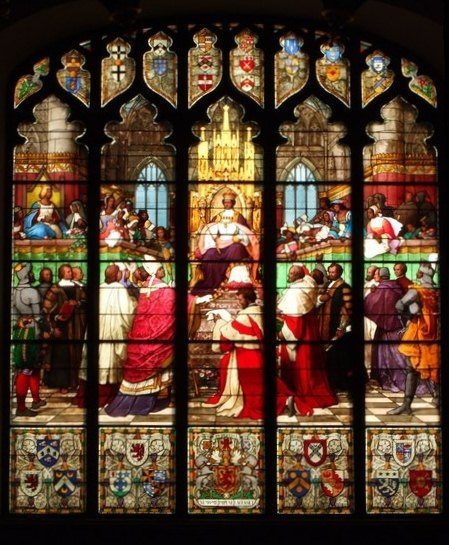
Institution of the Court of Session by James V in 1532, from the Great Window in Parliament House, Edinburgh

There is some evidence that, during the period of English control over Scotland, Edward I of England attempted to abolish Scottish laws in opposition to English law as he had done in Wales. Under Robert I in 1318, a parliament at Scone enacted a code of law that drew upon older practices. It codified procedures for criminal trials and protections for vassals from ejection from the land. From the 14th century, there are surviving examples of early Scottish legal literature, such as the Regiam Majestatem (on procedure at the royal courts) and the Quoniam Attachiamenta (on procedure at the barons court), which drew on both common and Roman law.

Customary laws, such as the Law of Clan MacDuff, came under attack from the Stewart Dynasty which consequently extended the reach of Scots common law. From the reign of King James I a legal profession began to develop and the administration of criminal and civil justice was centralised. The growing activity of the parliament and the centralisation of administration in Scotland called for the better dissemination of Acts of the parliament to the courts and other enforcers of the law. In the late 15th century, unsuccessful attempts were made to form commissions of experts to codify, update or define Scots law. The general practice during this period, as evidenced from records of cases, seems to have been to defer to specific Scottish laws on a matter when available and to fill in any gaps with provisions from the common law embodied in Civil and Canon law, which had the advantage of being written.

Under James IV the legal functions of the council were rationalised, with a royal Court of Session meeting daily in Edinburgh to deal with civil cases. In 1514, the office of justice-general was created for the Earl of Argyll (and held by his family until 1628). In 1532, the Royal College of Justice was founded, leading to the training and professionalisation of an emerging group of career lawyers. The Court of Session placed increasing emphasis on its independence from influence, including from the king, and superior jurisdiction over local justice. Its judges were increasingly able to control entry to their own ranks. In 1672, the High Court of Justiciary was founded from the College of Justice as a supreme court of appeal.

=== Currency ===
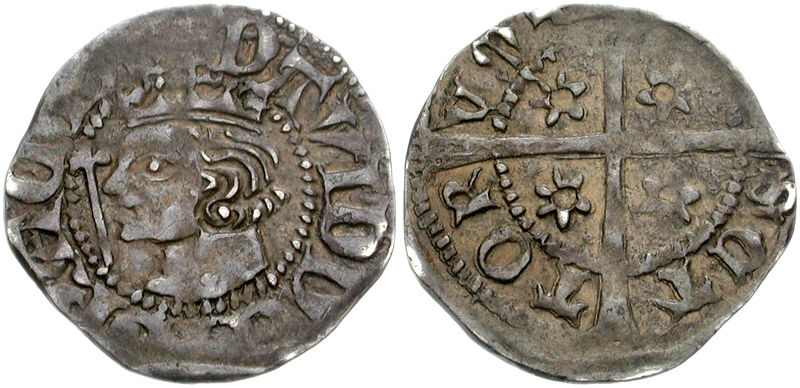
Penny of David II

David I is the first Scottish king known to have produced his own coinage. There were soon mints at Edinburgh, Berwick and Roxburgh. Early Scottish coins were similar to English ones, but with the king's head in profile instead of full face. The number of coins struck was small and English coins probably remained more significant in this period. The first gold coin was a noble (6s. 8d.) of David II. Under James I pennies and halfpennies of billon (an alloy of silver with a base metal) were introduced, and copper farthings appeared under James III. In James V's reign the bawbee (1 1/2 d) and half-bawbee were issued, and in Mary, Queen of Scot's reign a twopence piece, the hardhead, was issued to help "the common people buy bread, drink, flesh, and fish". The billon coinage was discontinued after 1603, but twopence pieces in copper continued to be issued until the Act of Union in 1707.

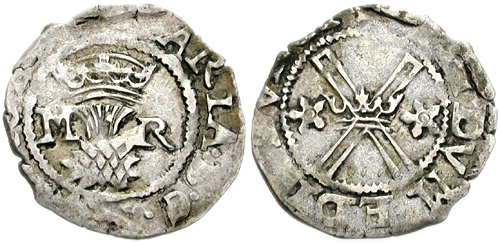
A bawbee minted during the reign of Mary, Queen of Scots

Early Scottish coins were virtually identical in silver content to English ones, but from c. 1300 onwards their silver content began to depreciate more rapidly than their English counterparts. Between 1300 and 1605, Scottish coins lost silver value at an average of 12 percent every decade, three times higher than the English rate. The Scottish penny became a base metal coin by c. 1484 and virtually disappeared as a separate coin from c. 1513 onwards. In 1356, an English proclamation banned the lower quality Scottish coins from being circulated in England. After the union of the Scottish and English crowns in 1603, the Pound Scots was reformed to closely match coins of the pound sterling, with £12 Scots equal to £1 sterling. The Parliament of Scotland enacted proposals in 1695 to set up the Bank of Scotland. The bank issued pound notes from 1704, which had the face value of £12 Scots. Scottish currency was abolished after the 1707 Act of Unions, with Scottish coins in circulation being drawn in to be re-minted according to English standards.

== Demographics ==
=== Geography ===
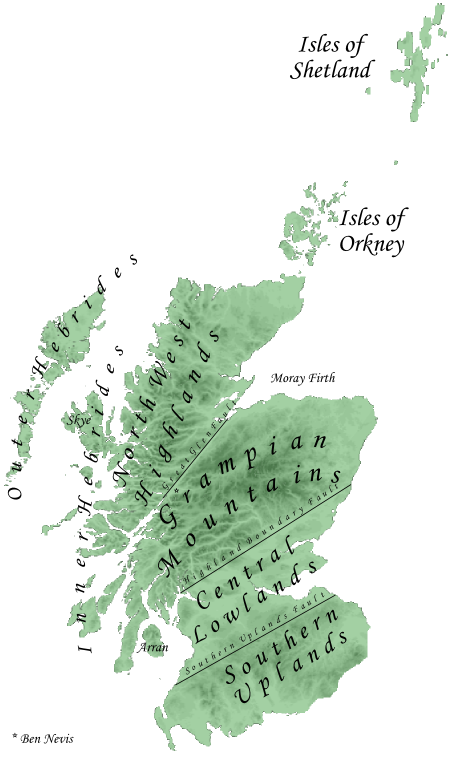
The topography of Scotland.

At its borders in 1707, the Kingdom of Scotland was half the size of England and Wales in area, but with its many inlets, islands and inland lochs, it had roughly the same amount of coastline at 4,000 miles (6,400 kilometres). Scotland has over 790 offshore islands, most of which are to be found in four main groups: Shetland, Orkney, and the Hebrides, subdivided into the Inner Hebrides and Outer Hebrides. Only a fifth of Scotland is less than 60 metres above sea level. The defining factor in the geography of Scotland is the distinction between the Highlands and Islands in the north and west and the Lowlands in the south and east. The Highlands are further divided into the Northwest Highlands and the Grampian Mountains by the fault line of the Great Glen. The Lowlands are divided into the fertile belt of the Central Lowlands and the higher terrain of the Southern Uplands, which included the Cheviot Hills, over which the border with England ran. The Central Lowland belt averages about 50 miles (80 kilometres) in width and, because it contains most of the good quality agricultural land and has easier communications, could support most of the urbanisation and elements of conventional government. However, the Southern Uplands and particularly the Highlands were economically less productive and much more difficult to govern.

Its east Atlantic position means that Scotland has very heavy rainfall: today about 700 mm per year in the east and over 1000 mm in the west. This encouraged the spread of blanket bogs, the acidity of which, combined with high level of wind and salt spray, made most of the islands treeless. The existence of hills, mountains, quicksands and marshes made internal communication and conquest extremely difficult and may have contributed to the fragmented nature of political power. The Uplands and Highlands had a relatively short growing season, in the extreme case of the upper Grampians an ice free season of four months or less and for much of the Highlands and Uplands of seven months or less. The early modern era also saw the impact of the Little Ice Age, with 1564 seeing thirty-three days of continual frost, where rivers and lochs froze, leading to a series of subsistence crises until the 1690s.

=== Demography ===
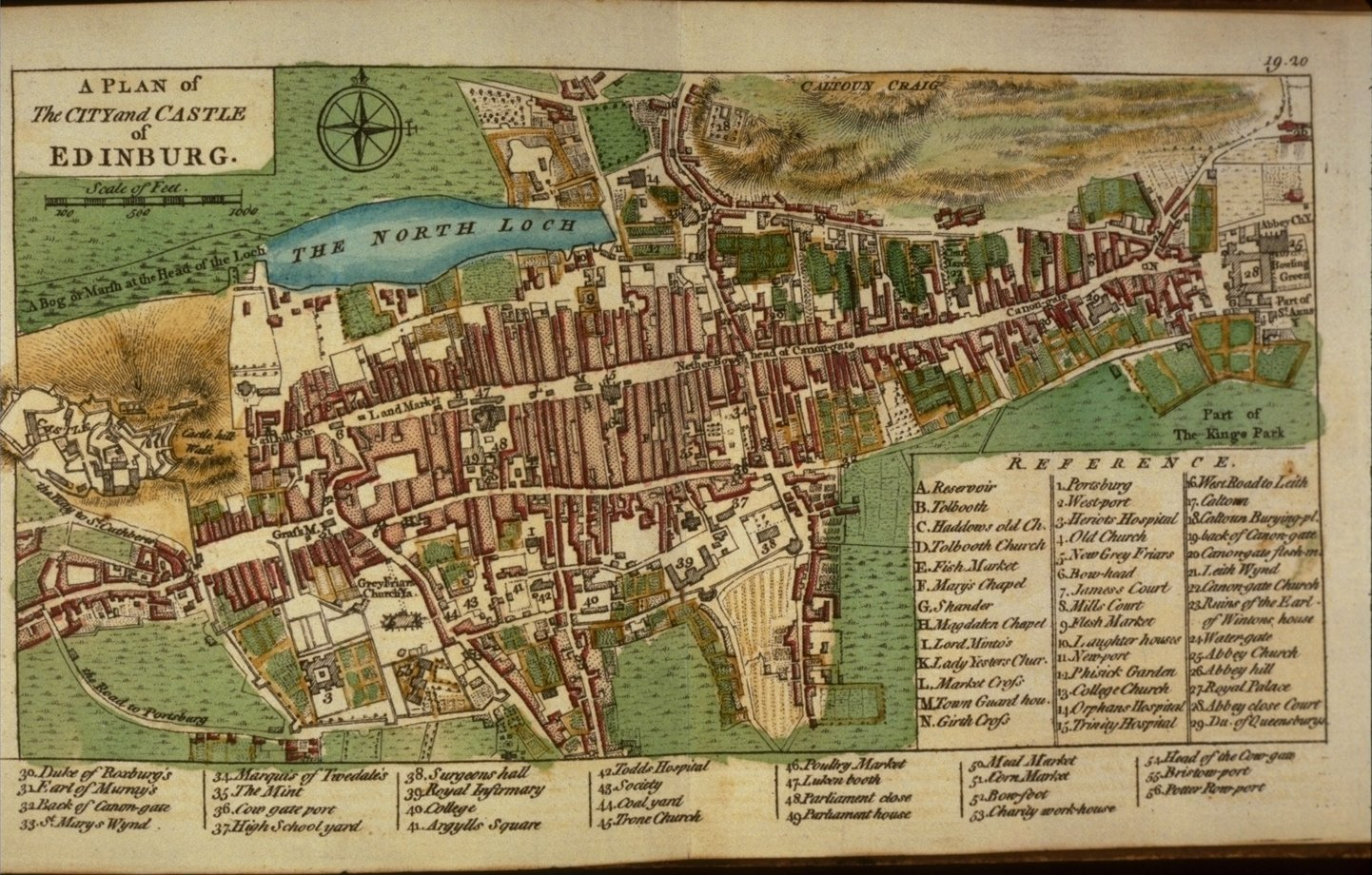
Plan of Edinburgh in 1764, the largest city in Scotland in the early modern era

From the formation of the Kingdom of Alba in the 10th century until before the Black Death arrived in 1349, estimates based on the amount of farmable land suggest that population may have grown from half a million to a million. Although there is no reliable documentation on the impact of the plague, there are many anecdotal references to abandoned land in the following decades. If the pattern followed that in England, then the population may have fallen to as low as half a million by the end of the 15th century.

Compared with the situation after the redistribution of population in the later Highland Clearances and the Industrial Revolution, these numbers would have been relatively evenly spread over the kingdom, with roughly half living north of the River Tay. Perhaps ten per cent of the population lived in one of many burghs that grew up in the later medieval period, mainly in the east and south. They would have had a mean population of about 2000, but many would have been much smaller than 1000 and the largest, Edinburgh, probably had a population of over 10,000 by the end of the medieval era.

Price inflation, which generally reflects growing demand for food, suggests that the population probably expanded in the first half of the 16th century, levelling off after the famine of 1595, as prices were relatively stable in the early 17th century. Calculations based on hearth tax returns for 1691 indicate a population of 1,234,575, but this figure may have been seriously affected by the subsequent famines of the late 1690s. By 1750, with its suburbs, Edinburgh reached 57,000. The only other towns above 10,000 by the same time were Glasgow with 32,000, Aberdeen with around 16,000 and Dundee with 12,000.

=== Language ===
The linguistic divide c. 1400, based on place-name evidence. Scottish Gaelic Scots Norn

Historical sources, as well as place name evidence, indicate the ways in which the Pictish language in the north and Cumbric languages in the south were overlaid and replaced by Gaelic, Old English and later Norse in the Early Middle Ages. By the High Middle Ages, the majority of people within Scotland spoke the Gaelic language, then simply called Scottish, or in Latin, lingua Scotica. In the Northern Isles the Norse language brought by Scandinavian occupiers and settlers evolved into the local Norn, which lingered until the end of the 18th century, and Norse may also have survived as a spoken language until the 16th century in the Outer Hebrides. French, Flemish and particularly English became the main languages of Scottish burghs, most of which were located in the south and east, an area to which Anglian settlers had already brought a form of Old English. In the later part of the 12th century, the writer Adam of Dryburgh described lowland Lothian as "the Land of the English in the Kingdom of the Scots". At least from the accession of David I, Gaelic ceased to be the main language of the royal court and was probably replaced by French, as evidenced by reports from contemporary chronicles, literature and translations of administrative documents into the French language.

In the Late Middle Ages, Early Scots, then called English, became the dominant spoken language of the kingdom, aside from in the Highlands and Islands and Galloway. It was derived largely from Old English, with the addition of elements from Gaelic and French. Although resembling the language spoken in northern England, it became a distinct dialect from the late 14th century onwards. It began to be adopted by the ruling elite as they gradually abandoned French. By the 15th century, it was the language of government, with acts of parliament, council records and treasurer's accounts almost all using it from the reign of James I onwards. As a result, Gaelic, once dominant north of the Tay, began a steady decline. Lowland writers began to treat Gaelic as a second-class, rustic and even amusing language, helping to frame attitudes towards the Highlands and to create a cultural gulf with the Lowlands.

From the mid-16th century, written Scots was increasingly influenced by the developing Standard English of Southern England due to developments in royal and political interactions with England. With the increasing influence and availability of books printed in England, most writing in Scotland came to be done in the English fashion. Unlike many of his predecessors, James VI generally despised Gaelic culture. Having extolled the virtues of Scots "poesie", after his accession to the English throne, he increasingly favoured the language of southern England. In 1611, the Kirk adopted the 1611 Authorized King James Version of the Bible. In 1617, interpreters were declared no longer necessary in the port of London because as Scots and Englishmen were now "not so far different bot ane understandeth ane uther". Jenny Wormald describes James as creating a "three-tier system, with Gaelic at the bottom and English at the top".

=== Religion ===
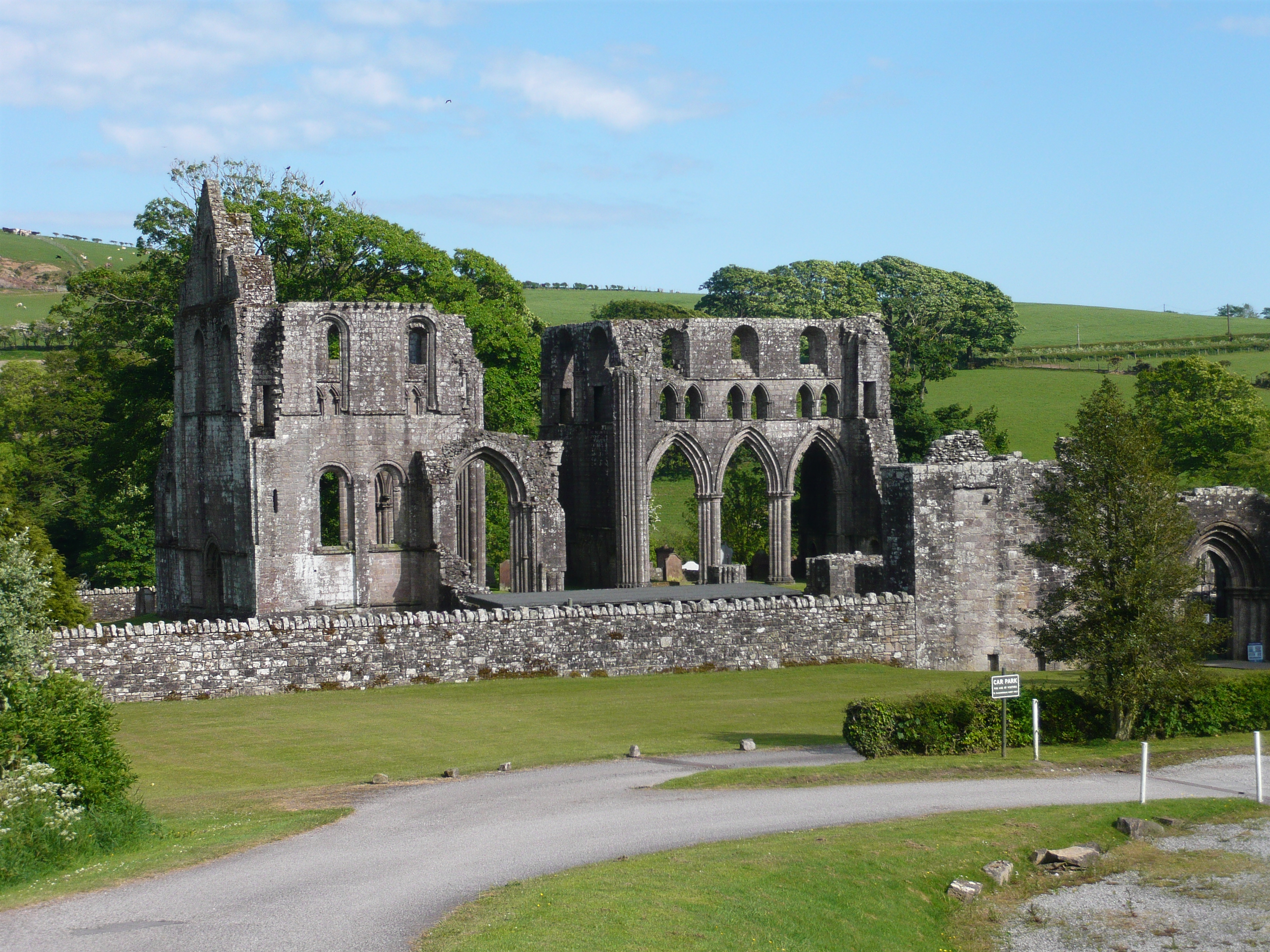
Dundrennan Abbey, one of the many royal foundations of the 12th century

The Pictish and Scottish kingdoms that would form the basis of the Kingdom of Alba were largely converted by Irish-Scots missions associated with figures such as St Columba, from the 5th to the 7th centuries. These missions tended to found monastic institutions and collegiate churches that served large areas. Partly as a result of these factors, some scholars have identified a distinctive form of Celtic Christianity, in which abbots were more significant than bishops, attitudes to clerical celibacy were more relaxed and there were some significant differences in practice with Roman Christianity, particularly the form of tonsure and the method of calculating Easter. Most of these issues had been resolved by the mid-7th century. After the reconversion of Scandinavian Scotland from the 10th century, Christianity under papal authority was the dominant religion of the kingdom.

In the Norman period, the Scottish church underwent a series of reforms and transformations. With royal and lay patronage, a clearer parochial structure based around local churches was developed. Large numbers of new foundations, which followed continental forms of reformed monasticism, began to predominate and the Scottish church established its independence from England, developed a clearer diocesan structure, becoming a "special daughter of the see of Rome", but lacking leadership in the form of Archbishops. In the late Middle Ages, the problems of schism in the Catholic Church allowed the Scottish Crown to gain greater influence over senior appointments and two archbishoprics had been established by the end of the 15th century. While some historians have discerned a decline of monasticism in the late Middle Ages, the mendicant orders of friars grew, particularly in the expanding burghs, to meet the spiritual needs of the population. New saints and cults of devotion also proliferated. Despite problems over the number and quality of clergy after the Black Death in the 14th century, and some evidence of heresy in this period, the Church in Scotland remained relatively stable before the 16th century.

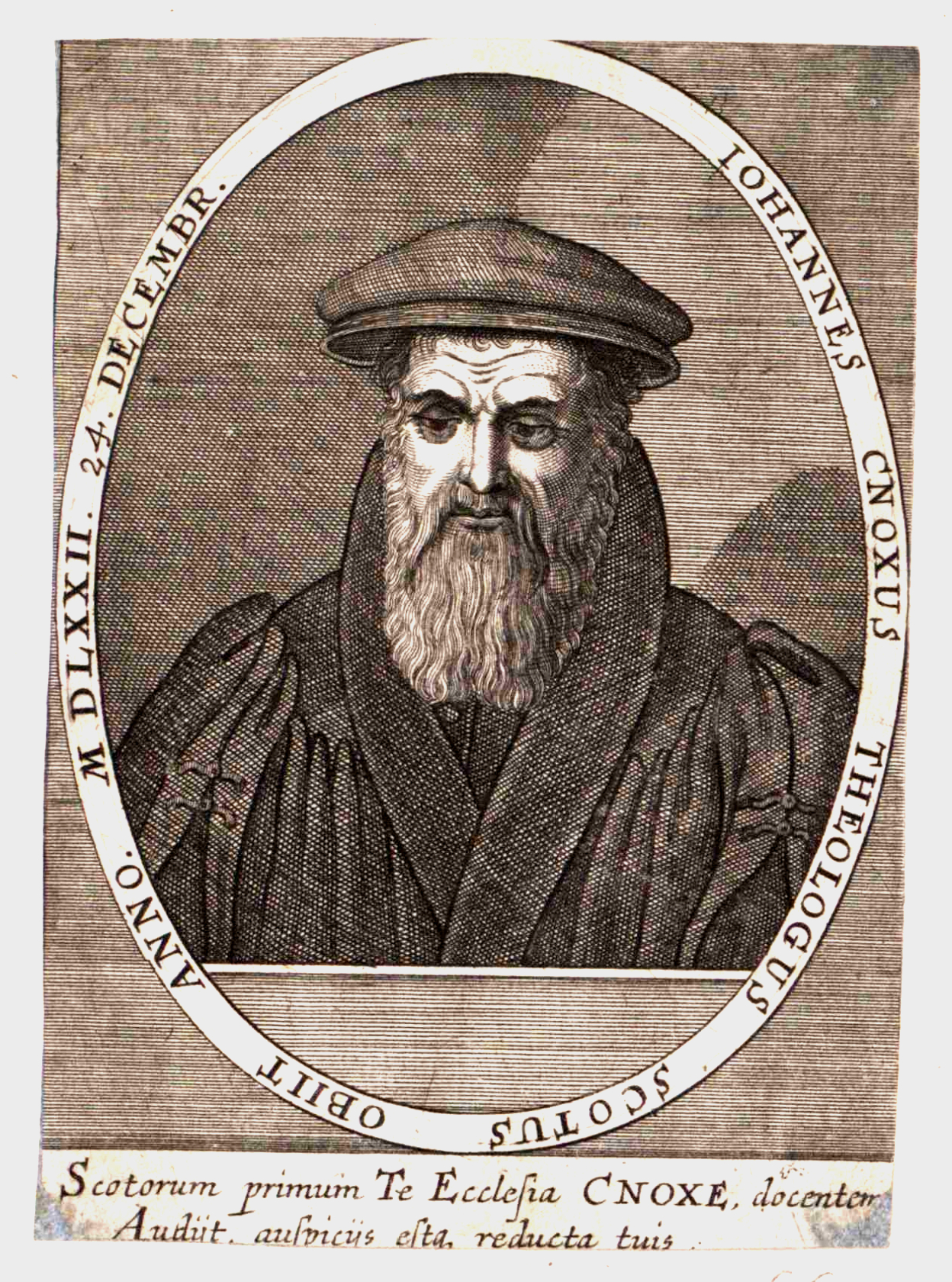
John Knox, one of the key figures in the Scottish Reformation

During the 16th century, Scotland underwent a Protestant Reformation that created a predominately Calvinist national church, the Church of Scotland (also known as 'the Kirk'), which was strongly Presbyterian in outlook, severely reducing the powers of bishops, although not abolishing them. The teachings of first Martin Luther and then John Calvin began to influence Scotland, particularly through Scottish scholars who had visited continental and English universities. Particularly important was the work of the Lutheran Scot Patrick Hamilton. His execution with other Protestant preachers in 1528, and of the Zwingli-influenced George Wishart in 1546, who was burnt at the stake in St Andrews, did nothing to stem the growth of these ideas. Wishart's supporters seized St Andrews Castle, which they held for a year before they were defeated with the help of French forces. The survivors, including chaplain John Knox, were condemned to be galley slaves, helping to create resentment of the French and martyrs for the Protestant cause. Limited toleration and the influence of exiled Scots and Protestants in other countries, led to the expansion of Protestantism, with a group of lairds declaring themselves Lords of the Congregation in 1557. By 1560, a relatively small group of Protestants were in a position to impose reform on the Scottish church. A confession of faith, rejecting papal jurisdiction and the mass, was adopted by Parliament in 1560. The Calvinism of the reformers led by Knox resulted in a settlement that adopted a Presbyterian system and rejected most of the elaborate trappings of the Medieval church. This gave considerable power within the new Kirk to local lairds, who often had control over the appointment of the clergy, and resulting in widespread, but generally orderly, iconoclasm. At this point the majority of the population was probably still Catholic in persuasion and the Kirk would find it difficult to penetrate the Highlands and Islands, but began a gradual process of conversion and consolidation that, compared with reformations elsewhere, was conducted with relatively little persecution.

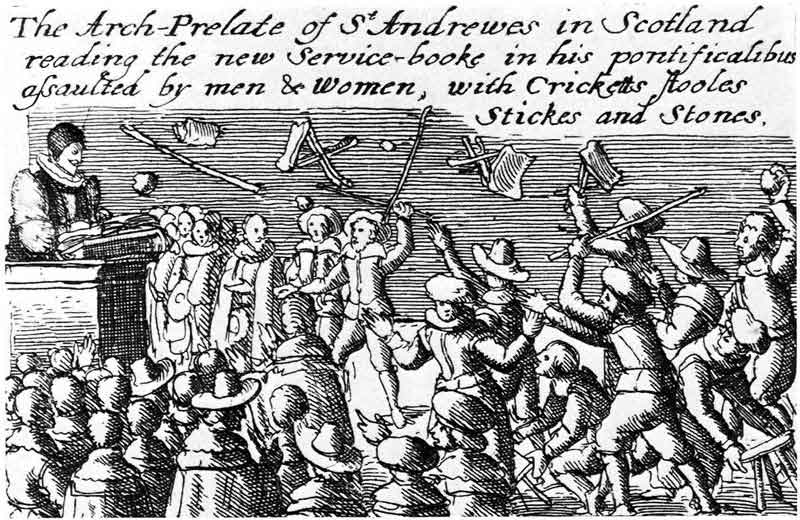
The riots set off by Jenny Geddes in St Giles Cathedral that sparked off the Bishops' Wars

In 1635, Charles I authorised a book of canons that made him head of the Church, ordained an unpopular ritual and enforced the use of a new liturgy. When the liturgy emerged in 1637 it was seen as an English-style Prayer Book, resulting in anger and widespread rioting. Representatives of various sections of Scottish society drew up the National Covenant on 28 February 1638, objecting to the King's liturgical innovations. The king's supporters were unable to suppress the rebellion and the king refused to compromise. In December of the same year, matters were taken even further, when at a meeting of the General Assembly in Glasgow the Scottish bishops were formally expelled from the Church, which was then established on a full Presbyterian basis. Victory in the resulting Bishops' Wars secured the Presbyterian Kirk and precipitated the outbreak of the civil wars of the 1640s. Disagreements over collaboration with Royalism created a major conflict between Protesters and Resolutioners, which became a long term divide in the Kirk.

At the Restoration of the monarchy in 1660, legislation was revoked back to 1633, removing the Covenanter gains of the Bishops' Wars, but the discipline of kirk sessions, presbyteries and synods were renewed. The reintroduction of episcopacy was a source of particular trouble in the south-west of the country, an area with strong Presbyterian sympathies. Abandoning the official church, many of the people here began to attend illegal field assemblies led by excluded ministers, known as conventicles. In the early 1680s, a more intense phase of persecution began, in what was later to be known in Protestant historiography as "the Killing Time". After the Glorious Revolution, Presbyterianism was restored and the bishops, who had generally supported James VII, abolished. However, William, who was more tolerant than the kirk tended to be, passed acts restoring the Episcopalian clergy excluded after the Revolution. The result was a Kirk divided between factions, with significant minorities, particularly in the west and north, of Episcopalians and Catholics.

=== Education ===
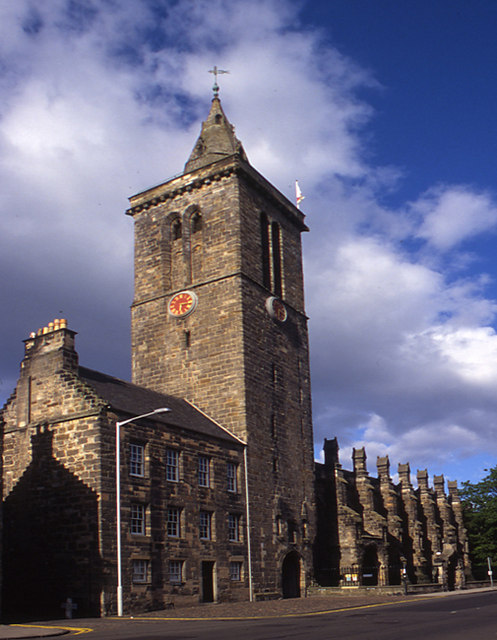
Tower of St Salvator's College, St Andrews, one of the three universities founded in the 15th century

The establishment of Christianity brought Latin to Scotland as a scholarly and written language. Monasteries served as repositories of knowledge and education, often running schools and providing a small educated elite, who were essential to create and read documents in a largely illiterate society. In the High Middle Ages, new sources of education arose, with song and grammar schools. These were usually attached to cathedrals or a collegiate church and were most common in the developing burghs. By the end of the Middle Ages grammar schools could be found in all the main burghs and some small towns. There were also petty schools, more common in rural areas and providing an elementary education. Some monasteries, like the Cistercian abbey at Kinloss, opened their doors to a wider range of students. The number and size of these schools seems to have expanded rapidly from the 1380s. They were almost exclusively aimed at boys, but by the end of the 15th century, Edinburgh also had schools for girls, sometimes described as "sewing schools", and probably taught by lay women or nuns. There was also the development of private tuition in the families of lords and wealthy burghers. The growing emphasis on education cumulated with the passing of the Education Act 1496, which decreed that all sons of barons and freeholders of substance should attend grammar schools to learn "perfyct Latyne". All this resulted in an increase in literacy, but which was largely concentrated among a male and wealthy elite, with perhaps 60 per cent of the nobility being literate by the end of the period.

Until the 15th century, those who wished to attend university had to travel to England or the continent, and just over a 1,000 have been identified as doing so between the 12th century and 1410. Among these the most important intellectual figure was John Duns Scotus, who studied at Oxford, Cambridge and Paris and probably died at Cologne in 1308, becoming a major influence on late medieval religious thought. The Wars of Independence largely closed English universities to Scots, and consequently continental universities became more significant. This situation was transformed by the founding of the University of St Andrews in 1413, the University of Glasgow in 1451 and the University of Aberdeen in 1495. Initially these institutions were designed for the training of clerics, but they were increasingly used by laymen who would begin to challenge the clerical monopoly of administrative posts in the government and law. Those wanting to study for second degrees still needed to go abroad. The continued movement to other universities produced a school of Scottish nominalists at Paris in the early 16th century, of which John Mair was probably the most important figure. By 1497, the humanist and historian Hector Boece, born in Dundee, returned from Paris to become the first principal at the new university of Aberdeen. These international contacts helped integrate Scotland into a wider European scholarly world and would be one of the most important ways in which the new ideas of humanism were brought into Scottish intellectual life.

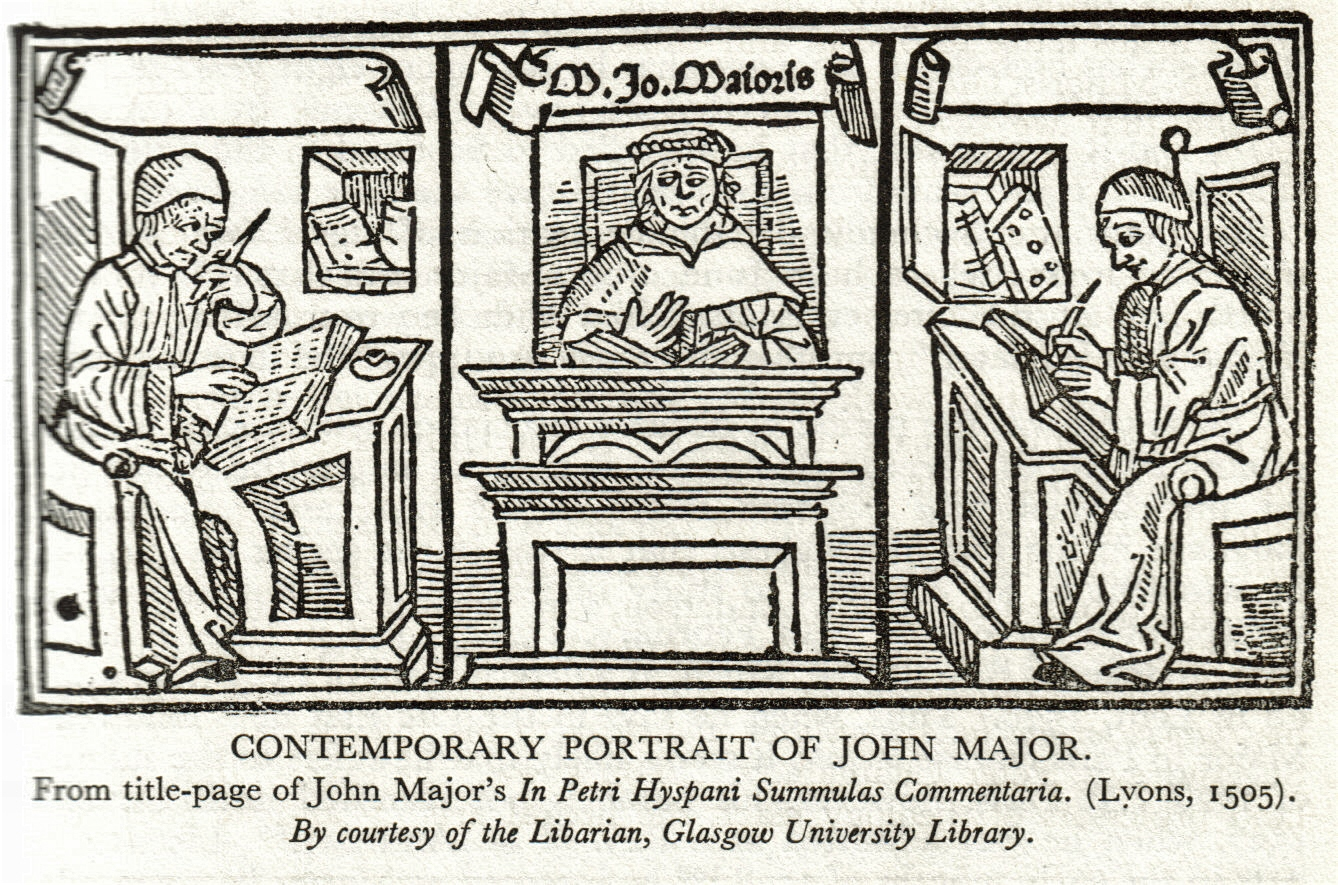
A woodcut showing John Mair, one of the most successful products of the Scottish educational system in the late 15th century

The humanist concern with widening education was shared by the Protestant reformers, with a desire for a godly people replacing the aim of having educated citizens. In 1560, the First Book of Discipline set out a plan for a school in every parish, but this proved financially impossible. In the burghs the old schools were maintained, with the song schools and a number of new foundations becoming reformed grammar schools or ordinary parish schools. Schools were supported by a combination of kirk funds, contributions from local heritors or burgh councils and parents that could pay. They were inspected by kirk sessions, who checked for the quality of teaching and doctrinal purity. There were also large number of unregulated "adventure schools", which sometimes fulfilled a local needs and sometimes took pupils away from the official schools. Outside of the established burgh schools, masters often combined their position with other employment, particularly minor posts within the kirk, such as clerk. At their best, the curriculum included catechism, Latin, French, Classical literature and sports.

In 1616, an act in Privy council commanded every parish to establish a school "where convenient means may be had", and when the Parliament of Scotland ratified this with the Education Act 1633, a tax on local landowners was introduced to provide the necessary endowment. A loophole which allowed evasion of this tax was closed in the Education Act 1646, which established a solid institutional foundation for schools on Covenanter principles. Although the Restoration brought a reversion to the 1633 position, in 1696 new legislation restored the provisions of 1646. An act of the Scottish parliament in 1696 underlined the aim of having a school in every parish. In rural communities these obliged local landowners (heritors) to provide a schoolhouse and pay a schoolmaster, while ministers and local presbyteries oversaw the quality of the education. In many Scottish towns, burgh schools were operated by local councils. By the late 17th century, there was a largely complete network of parish schools in the Lowlands, but in the Highlands basic education was still lacking in many areas.

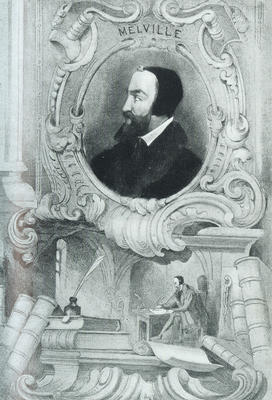
Andrew Melville, credited with major reforms in Scottish Universities in the 16th century.

The widespread belief in the limited intellectual and moral capacity of women, vied with a desire, intensified after the Reformation, for women to take personal moral responsibility, particularly as wives and mothers. In Protestantism this necessitated an ability to learn and understand the catechism and even to be able to independently read the Bible, but most commentators, even those that tended to encourage the education of girls, thought they should not receive the same academic education as boys. In the lower ranks of society, they benefited from the expansion of the parish schools system that took place after the Reformation, but were usually outnumbered by boys, often taught separately, for a shorter time and to a lower level. They were frequently taught reading, sewing and knitting, but not writing. Female illiteracy rates based on signatures among female servants were around 90 percent, from the late 17th to the early 18th centuries and perhaps 85 percent for women of all ranks by 1750, compared with 35 per cent for men. Among the nobility there were many educated and cultured women, of which Mary, Queen of Scots is the most obvious example.

After the Reformation, Scotland's universities underwent a series of reforms associated with Andrew Melville, who returned from Geneva to become principal of the University of Glasgow in 1574. He placed an emphasis on simplified logic and elevated languages and sciences to the same status as philosophy, allowing accepted ideas in all areas to be challenged. He introduced new specialist teaching staff, replacing the system of "regenting", where one tutor took the students through the entire arts curriculum. Metaphysics were abandoned and Greek became compulsory in the first year followed by Aramaic, Syriac and Hebrew, launching a new fashion for ancient and biblical languages. Glasgow had probably been declining as a university before his arrival, but students now began to arrive in large numbers. He assisted in the reconstruction of Marischal College, Aberdeen, and in order to do for St Andrews what he had done for Glasgow, he was appointed Principal of St Mary's College, St Andrews, in 1580. The University of Edinburgh developed out of public lectures were established in the town 1440s on law, Greek, Latin and philosophy, under the patronage of Mary of Guise. These evolved into the "Tounis College", which would become the University of Edinburgh in 1582. The results were a revitalisation of all Scottish universities, which were now producing a quality of education the equal of that offered anywhere in Europe. Under the Commonwealth, the universities saw an improvement in their funding, as they were given income from deaneries, defunct bishoprics and the excise, allowing the completion of buildings including the college in the High Street in Glasgow. They were still largely seen as a training school for clergy, and came under the control of the hard line Protestors. After the Restoration there was a purge of the universities, but much of the intellectual advances of the preceding period was preserved. The universities recovered from the upheavals of the mid-century with a lecture-based curriculum that was able to embrace economics and science, offering a high quality liberal education to the sons of the nobility and gentry.

== Military ==
=== Navy ===
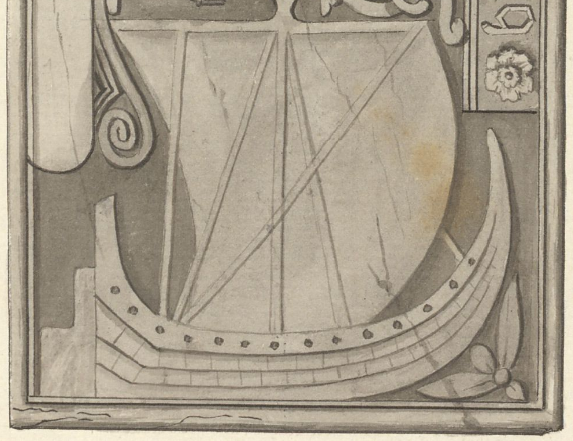
A carving of a birlinn from a 16th-century tombstone in MacDufie's Chapel, Oronsay, as engraved in 1772

There are mentions in medieval records of fleets commanded by Scottish kings including William the Lion and Alexander II. The latter took personal command of a large naval force which sailed from the Firth of Clyde and anchored off the island of Kerrera in 1249, intended to transport his army in a campaign against the Kingdom of the Isles, but he died before the campaign could begin. Records indicate that Alexander had several large oared ships built at Ayr, but he avoided a sea battle. Defeat on land at the Battle of Largs and winter storms forced the Norwegian fleet to return home, leaving the Scottish Crown as the major power in the region and leading to the ceding of the Western Isles to Alexander in 1266.

Part of the reason for Robert I's success in the Wars of Independence was his ability to call on naval forces from the Islands. As a result of the expulsion of the Flemings from England in 1303, he gained the support of a major naval power in the North Sea. The development of naval power allowed Robert to successfully defeat English attempts to capture him in the Highlands and Islands and to blockade major English controlled fortresses at Perth and Stirling, the last forcing Edward II to attempt the relief that resulted in English defeat at Bannockburn in 1314. Scottish naval forces allowed invasions of the Isle of Man in 1313 and 1317 and Ireland in 1315. They were also crucial in the blockade of Berwick, which led to its fall in 1318. After the establishment of Scottish independence, Robert I turned his attention to building up a Scottish naval capacity. This was largely focused on the west coast, with the Exchequer Rolls of 1326 recording the feudal duties of his vassals in that region to aid him with their vessels and crews. Towards the end of his reign he supervised the building of at least one royal man-of-war near his palace at Cardross on the River Clyde. In the late 14th century, naval warfare with England was conducted largely by hired Scots, Flemish and French merchantmen and privateers. James I took a greater interest in naval power. After his return to Scotland in 1424, he established a shipbuilding yard at Leith, a house for marine stores, and a workshop. King's ships were built and equipped there to be used for trade as well as war, one of which accompanied him on his expedition to the Islands in 1429. The office of Lord High Admiral was probably founded in this period. In his struggles with his nobles in 1488 James III received assistance from his two warships the Flower and the King's Carvel also known as the Yellow Carvel.

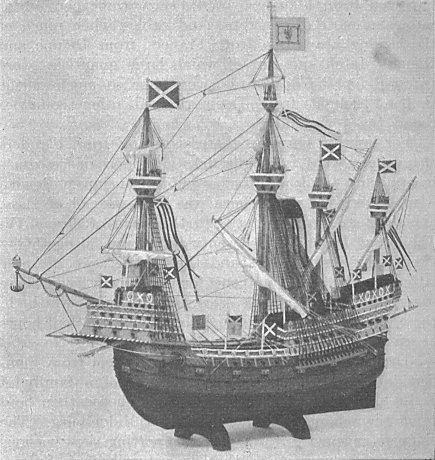
A model of the Great Michael in the Royal Museum

There were various attempts to create royal naval forces in the 15th century. James IV put the enterprise on a new footing, founding a harbour at Newhaven and a dockyard at the Pools of Airth. He acquired a total of 38 ships including the Great Michael, at that time, the largest ship in Europe. Scottish ships had some success against privateers, accompanied the king on his expeditions in the islands and intervened in conflicts in Scandinavia and the Baltic, but were sold after the Flodden campaign and after 1516 Scottish naval efforts would rely on privateering captains and hired merchantmen. James V did not share his father's interest in developing a navy and shipbuilding fell behind that of the Low Countries. Despite truces between England and Scotland there were periodic outbreaks of a guerre de course. James V built a new harbour at Burntisland in 1542. The chief use of naval power in his reign was a series of expeditions to the Isles and France. After the Union of Crowns in 1603 conflict between Scotland and England ended, but Scotland found itself involved in England's foreign policy, opening up Scottish shipping to attack. In 1626, a squadron of three ships was bought and equipped. There were also several marque fleets of privateers. In 1627, the Royal Scots Navy and accompanying contingents of burgh privateers participated in the major expedition to Biscay. The Scots also returned to the West Indies and in 1629 took part in the capture of Quebec.

During the Bishop's Wars the king attempted to blockade Scotland and planned amphibious assaults from England on the East coast and from Ireland to the West. Scottish privateers took a number of English prizes. After the Covenanters allied with the English Parliament they established two patrol squadrons for the Atlantic and North Sea coasts, known collectively as the "Scotch Guard". The Scottish navy was unable to withstand the English fleet that accompanied the army led by Cromwell that conquered Scotland in 1649–1651 and the Scottish ships and crews were split up among the Commonwealth fleet. Scottish seamen received protection against arbitrary impressment by English men of war, but a fixed quota of conscripts for the Royal Navy was levied from the sea-coast burghs during the second half of the 17th century. Royal Navy patrols were now found in Scottish waters even in peacetime. In the Second (1665–1667) and Third Anglo-Dutch Wars (1672–1674) between 80 and 120 captains, took Scottish letters of marque and privateers played a major part in the naval conflict. In the 1690s, a small fleet of five ships was established by merchants for the Darien Scheme, and a professional navy was established for the protection of commerce in home waters during the Nine Years' War, with three purpose-built warships bought from English shipbuilders in 1696. After the Act of Union in 1707, these vessels were transferred to the Royal Navy.

=== Army ===
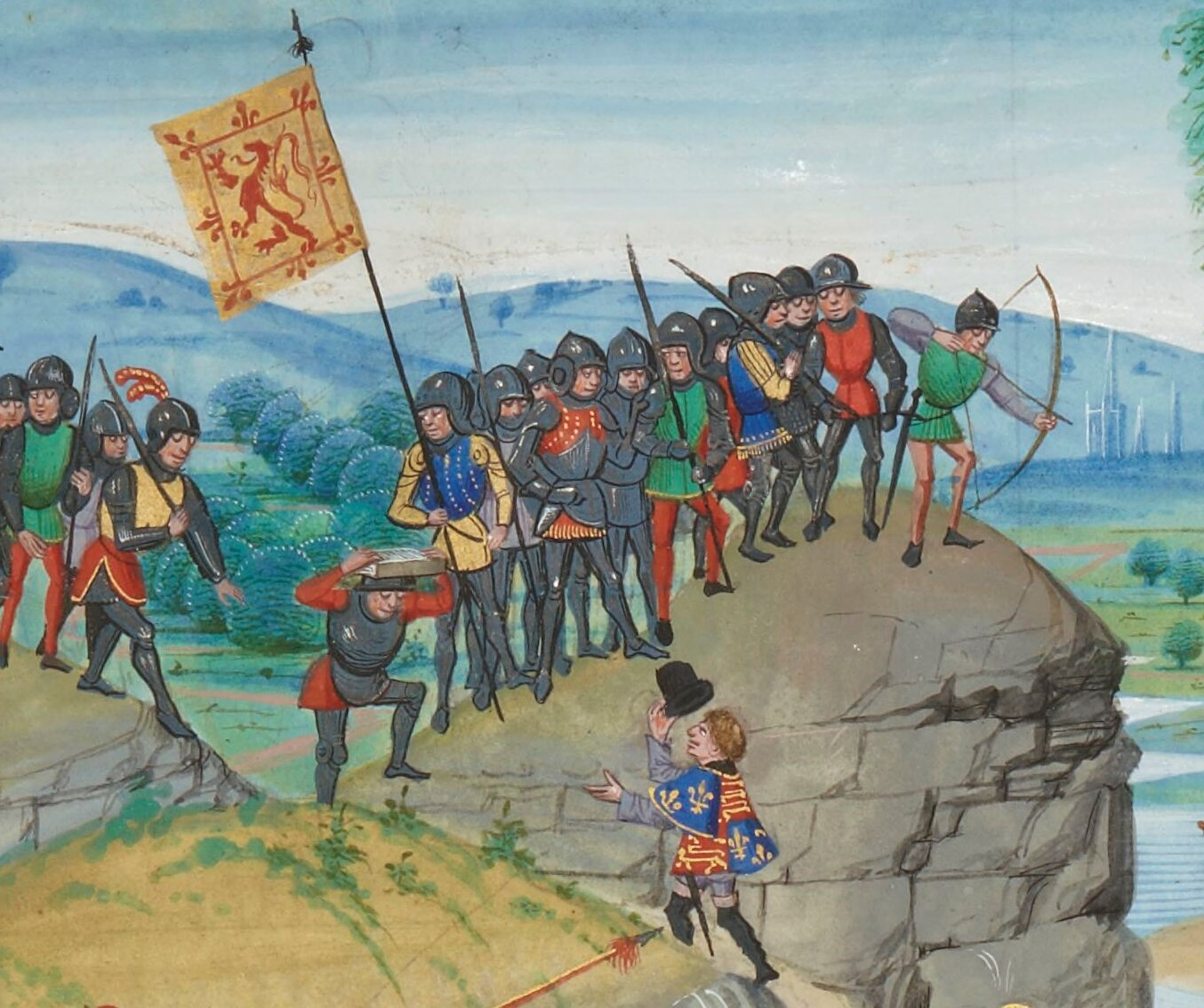
Scottish soldiers in the period of the Hundred Years' War, detail from an edition of Froissart's Chronicles

Before the Wars of the Three Kingdoms in the mid-17th century, there was no standing army in the Kingdom of Scotland. In the Early Middle Ages, war in Scotland was characterised by the use of small war-bands of household troops often engaging in raids and low level warfare. By the High Middle Ages, the kings of Scotland could command forces of tens of thousands of men for short periods as part of the "common army", mainly of poorly armoured spear and bowmen. After the "Davidian Revolution" of the 12th century, which introduced elements of feudalism to Scotland, these forces were augmented by small numbers of mounted and heavily armoured knights. These armies rarely managed to stand up to the usually larger and more professional armies produced by England, but they were used to good effect by Robert I at the Battle of Bannockburn in 1314 to secure Scottish independence. After the Wars of Scottish Independence, the Auld Alliance between Scotland and France played a large part in the country's military activities, especially during the Hundred Years' War. In the Late Middle Ages, under the Stewart kings forces were further augmented by specialist troops, particularly men-at-arms and archers, hired by bonds of manrent, similar to English indentures of the same period. Archers became much sought after as mercenaries in French armies of the 15th century in order to help counter the English superiority in this arm, becoming a major element of the French royal guards as the Garde Écossaise. The Stewarts also adopted major innovations in continental warfare, such as longer pikes and the extensive use of artillery. However, in the early 16th century one of the best armed and largest Scottish armies ever assembled still met with defeat at the hands of an English army at the Battle of Flodden Field in 1513, which saw the destruction of a large number of ordinary troops, a large section of the nobility and the king, James IV. In the 16th century, the crown took an increasing role in the supply of military equipment. The pike began to replace the spear and the Scots began to convert from the bow to gunpowder firearms. The feudal heavy cavalry had begun to disappear from Scottish armies and the Scots fielded relatively large numbers of light horse, often drawn from the borders. James IV brought in experts from France, Germany and the Netherlands and established a gun foundry in 1511. Gunpowder weaponry fundamentally altered the nature of castle architecture from the mid-15th century.

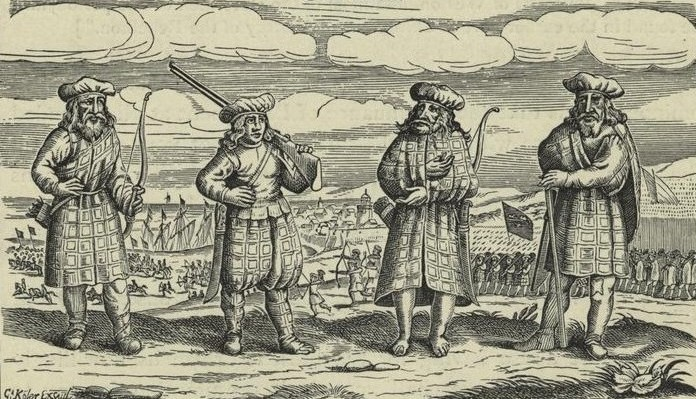
The earliest image of Scottish soldiers wearing tartan; 1631 German engraving.

In the early 17th century, relatively large numbers of Scots took service in foreign armies involved in the Thirty Years War. As armed conflict with Charles I in the Bishop's Wars became likely, hundreds of Scots mercenaries returned home from foreign service, including experienced leaders like Alexander and David Leslie and these veterans played an important role in training recruits. These systems would form the basis of the Covenanter armies that intervened in the Civil Wars in England and Ireland. Scottish infantry were generally armed, as was almost universal in Western Europe, with a combination of pike and shot. Scottish armies may also have had individuals with a variety of weapons including bows, Lochaber axes, and halberds. Most cavalry were probably equipped with pistols and swords, although there is some evidence that they included lancers. Royalist armies, like those led by James Graham, Marquis of Montrose (1643–1644) and in Glencairn's rising (1653–1654) were mainly composed of conventionally armed infantry with pike and shot. Montrose's forces were short of heavy artillery suitable for siege warfare and had only a small force of cavalry.

At the Restoration the Privy Council established a force of several infantry regiments and a few troops of horse and there were attempts to found a national militia on the English model. The standing army was mainly employed in the suppression of Covenanter rebellions and the guerilla war undertaken by the Cameronians in the East. Pikemen became less important in the late 17th century and after the introduction of the socket bayonet disappeared altogether, while matchlock muskets were replaced by the more reliable flintlock. On the eve of the Glorious Revolution, the standing army in Scotland was about 3,000 men in various regiments and another 268 veterans in the major garrison towns. After the Glorious Revolution the Scots were drawn into King William II's continental wars, beginning with the Nine Years' War in Flanders (1689–1697). By the time of the Act of Union, the Kingdom of Scotland had a standing army of seven units of infantry, two of horse and one troop of Horse Guards, besides varying levels of fortress artillery in the garrison castles of Edinburgh, Dumbarton, and Stirling, which would be incorporated into the British Army.

== Flags ==
Flags and standards

Royal Standard of Scotland

Royal Standard of Scotland used, with minor variations, between 1603 and 1707

Flag of Scotland; Azure, a saltire argent

Scottish Union Flag used between 1606 and 1707

The earliest recorded use of the Lion Rampant as a royal emblem in Scotland was by Alexander II in 1222. It is recorded with the additional embellishment of a double border set with lilies during the reign of Alexander III (1249–1286). This emblem occupied the shield of the royal coat of arms which, together with a royal banner displaying the same, was used by the King of Scots until the Union of the Crowns in 1603. Then it was incorporated into both the royal arms and royal banners of successive Scottish then British monarchs in order to symbolise Scotland; as can be seen today in the Royal Standard of the United Kingdom. Although now officially restricted to use by representatives of the Sovereign and at royal residences, the Royal Standard of Scotland continues to be one of Scotland's most recognisable symbols.

According to legend, the apostle and martyr Saint Andrew, the patron saint of Scotland, was crucified on an X-shaped cross at Patras (Patrae) in Achaea. Use of the familiar iconography of his martyrdom, showing the apostle bound to an X-shaped cross, first appears in the Kingdom of Scotland in 1180 during the reign of William I. This image was again depicted on seals used during the late 13th century; including on one particular example used by the Guardians of Scotland, dated 1286. Use of a simplified symbol associated with Saint Andrew which does not depict his image, namely the saltire, or crux decussata (from the Latin crux, 'cross', and decussis, 'having the shape of the Roman numeral X'), has its origins in the late 14th century; the Parliament of Scotland decreed in 1385 that Scottish soldiers wear a white Saint Andrew's Cross on their person, both in front and behind, for the purpose of identification. The earliest reference to the Saint Andrew's Cross as a flag is to be found in the Vienna Book of Hours, c. 1503, where a white saltire is depicted with a red background. In the case of Scotland, use of a blue background for the Saint Andrew's Cross is said to date from at least the 15th century, with the first certain illustration of a flag depicting such appearing in Sir David Lyndsay of the Mount's Register of Scottish Arms, c. 1542.

Following the Union of the Crowns in 1603, James VI, King of Scots, commissioned new designs for a banner incorporating the flags of the Kingdom of Scotland and Kingdom of England. In 1606, a Union Flag was commissioned, combining the crosses of Saint George (the Flag of England), with that of Saint Andrew. There was also a Scottish version of this flag, in which the cross of Saint Andrew overlaid the cross of St George. This design may have seen limited, unofficial use in Scotland until 1707, when the English variant of the same, whereby the cross of St George overlaid that of St Andrew, was adopted as the flag of the unified Kingdom of Great Britain.

== See also ==
- Falkland Palace
- Linlithgow Palace
- List of monarchs of Scotland
- Obsolete Scottish units of measurement
- Royal Consorts of Scotland
- Scottish monarchs family tree
- Scottish Term Day

== Notes ==
| Kingdom of Scotland; 843–1707 | Succeeded by: Kingdom of Great Britain; 1707–1800 | Succeeded by: United Kingdom of Great Britain and Ireland; 1801–1922 | Succeeded by: United Kingdom of Great Britain and Northern Ireland; 1922–present |
