= Braflang Scóine =

The Braflang Scóine (English translation: "Pit-fall of Scone" or "Treachery of Scone") is a lost tale seemingly of 11th-century Scottish origin. It appears in a list of literary tales a "good poet ought to know" in the Book of Leinster; its absence from another similar list suggests that the story came to Ireland and the attention of the compiler in the 11th century.

Benjamin Hudson argued that the tale was the basis for the account given by Gerald of Wales in the Instructions for Princes and by the author of the Prophecy of Berchán. In this story, the Scots invite the Pictish nobles to their banquet hall for a feast; the Scots however prearranged for the banquet seats to sit on top of a pit, and engineered the set-up in such a way that removing a pin would drop those seated into the pit underneath. Gerald's tale did not feature Kenneth MacAlpin or Drust.

Gerald alleged this allowed the Scots to conquer the Picts, demonstrating for his reader how by perfidy "an inferior people can overcome a superior race". The account, hostile to the Scots in the way Gerald told it, was repeated in future Anglo-Norman and English histories, including the Polychronicon of Ranulf Higdon. The tale is a recognisable part of European folklore, being classed by Stith Thompson as tale-type K 811.1.

== See also ==
- MacAlpin's Treason
- Origins of the Kingdom of Alba
