= Áed Find =

King of Dal Riata

Áed Find (Áed the White), or Áed mac Echdach (before 732–778), was king of Dál Riata (modern western Scotland and County Antrim, Ireland). Áed was the son of Eochaid mac Echdach, a descendant of Domnall Brecc in the main line of Cenél nGabráin kings. (Note: Áed is also sometimes known as Áed Finn and Aed Finn.)

According to later genealogies, Áed was the great-grandfather of Kenneth MacAlpin (Cináed mac Ailpín) who is traditionally counted as the first king of Scots. This descent ran through Áed's son Eochaid mac Áeda Find and Eochaid's son Alpín mac Echdach. The evidence for the existence of Eochaid and Alpín is uncompelling.

The Annals of Ulster in 768 report "Bellum i Fortrinn iter Aedh & Cinaedh": a battle in Fortriu between Áed and Cináed. This is usually read as meaning Áed Find and the Pictish king Ciniod I, who is called "Cinadhon" in the notice of his death in 775.

Áed's death in 778 is noted by the Annals of Ulster. He appears to have been followed as king by his brother Fergus mac Echdach.

The "Laws of Áed Eochaid's son" are mentioned by the Chronicle of the Kings of Alba in the reign of Áed's supposed great-grandson Donald MacAlpin (Domnall mac Ailpín): "In his time the Gaels with their king made the rights and laws of the kingdom [that are called the laws] of Áed Eochaid's son, in Forteviot." What these laws concerned is not known.

== In fiction ==
Áed Find is playable in Crusader Kings II (under the regnal name Áed III) in the Charlemagne DLC's 769 AD start date, and is treated as an independent duke. His son Eochaid and brother Fergus also exist in his court. Without player intervention his realm is usually quickly conquered by neighboring Pictland.

== Notes ==
| Preceded by Interregnum | King of Dál Riata before 768–778 | Succeeded by Fergus mac Echdach |
