= Donald of Scotland =

Donald of Scotland can refer to:

- Domnall mac Ailpín (Donald I of Scotland)
- Donald II of Scotland
- Donald III of Scotland
