= Forteviot Bronze Age tomb =

Tomb in Scotland discovered in 2009

- Interactive map of Forteviot Bronze Age tomb
- 56°20′25.42″N 3°31′49.04″W
- Type: chamber tomb
- Periods: Bronze Age
- Location: near Forteviot (Fothair Tabhaicht)
- Region: Perth and Kinross (Peairt agus Ceann Rois), Scotland (Scottish Gaelic: Alba)

Forteviot Bronze Age tomb is a Bronze Age burial chamber discovered in 2009 at Forteviot near Perth, Scotland. The Bronze Age tomb is one of a number of archaeological digs at the site that Co-directors of the excavation, Dr. Gordon Noble of the University of Aberdeen, and professor Stephen Driscoll and Dr Kenneth Brophy, both of the University of Glasgow, are currently conducting.

The excavation at Forteviot is part of a long-term collaborative study by the Strathearn Environs and Royal Forteviot (SERF) project – funded by Historic Scotland and the Perth and Kinross Heritage Trust – to study the archaeology of the former Pictish royal centre in the Strathearn region of what later became Central Scotland.

== Discovery and finds in Burial Chamber ==
A high-status four-ton slab, forty centimetres thick and measuring two metres by two metres, was unearthed by archaeologists excavating at the site of a major Pictish Royal centre. Using a giant crane to remove the slab, known as a capstone, a burial chamber was revealed containing what little remained of a Bronze Age body and grave goods. The underside of the capstone had been engraved with a spiral and axe shape. The cist, built using large sandstone slabs in a rectangular shape, had several axes and other weapon engravings where the head of the deceased would have been positioned. Such carvings in that part of Scotland are very rare although there are similar carvings at Kilmartin Glen, in Argyll. Thought to be of high social standing, the body had been laid on a bed of white quartz pebbles and an interwoven lattice of birch bark. Amongst the grave goods were a dozen personal possessions which included a leather bag, wooden objects and a bronze dagger with a ribbed gold band around the hilt. The discovery of plant matter among the remains were later found to be flowers, possibly meadowsweet, and is the first evidence that Bronze Age people placed flowers with their dead. Radiocarbon tests and the style of metalwork found in the grave suggest that the tomb dates from between 1950 BC and 2100 BC. Prehistorian Dr. Noble has said of the find: "The sheer size of the stone slabs used to construct the tomb, the extremely rare rock engravings, the rare preservation of the leather, wood, and bark items and the high status location make this a find of both national and international importance".

== Archaeological Site ==
The head of Historic Scotland archaeology programmes and grants said of the find:

The fact that this important individual was buried at a location which we know was one of the main power centres in the country almost 3000 years later is remarkable, but it is far too early to decide if this is coincidence or continuity.

— Dr Noel Fojut

The same location is also believed to have been the site of a palace, around 3000 years later, where a King of the Picts and first King of Scotland, Kenneth MacAlpin, died and was buried in AD 858, and whose dynasty continued to produce kings of a united Scotland.

Among other excavations and finds were an early historic cemetery, which would have been associated with the Royal centre at Forteviot, and a Neolithic Henge constructed from timber dating back to 2600BC which project director Dr Kenneth Brophy said "would dwarf Stonehenge" in size. A major prehistoric monument was also uncovered, revealing the entrance avenue of a massive timber enclosure dating to the late Neolithic period (around 5000 years ago). Also excavated was a nearby hill fort, and there was a survey at an early Christian chapel.

== See also ==
- Migdale Hoard
- Newbridge chariot
- Prehistoric Scotland
- Timeline of prehistoric Scotland
