= Chronicle of Huntingdon =

Chronicle of Scottish kings published in 1291

The Chronicle of Huntingdon is a medieval chronicle of events in Scotland compiled at the Priory of Huntingdon in 1291. It is currently in London in the Treasury of His Majesty's Exchequer

It is based in part upon the Chronicle of Melrose Abbey. Huntingdon, despite being in Cambridgeshire in eastern England, had a Scottish connection because King David I of Scotland married Maud, Countess of Huntingdon, in 1113, becoming the Earl of Huntingdon. The title was inherited by his son Henry in 1136, so it is believed that the earlier part of this chronicle, prior to Malcolm Canmore, was derived from a Scottish source.

In 1290, Edward I of England with little advance notice commanded English cathedrals and large monasteries, including Huntingdon, to compile historical data on relations between English and Scottish kings. In response, the chronicle was compiled by the canons in Huntingdon in the spring of 1291.

The chronicle is a Latin list of Scottish kings, beginning with Kenneth mac Alpin and ending at the beginning of the reign of Alexander III in 1249. The chronicle commences with a battle between the Picts and Alpín mac Echdach, king of the Scots, in 834; and a marginal note claims that the Scots had possessed the country for 456 years from Alpin, the addition of which figure to 834 suggests that the chronicle may have been begun in 1290.

Over time the manuscript deteriorated, with many words in the narrative of the reigns of Alpin and his son Kenneth MacAlpin becoming illegible, although the text of these lacunae can usually be supplied by referring to the Chronica Gentis Scotorum of John of Fordun, who used the chronicle as a source.
