= Ciniod of the Picts =

Ciniod of the Picts may refer to:

- Ciniod I of the Picts (?-775)
- Ciniod II of the Picts (fl. 842)
- Ciniod III of the Picts (before 967–1005)
