= Domnall mac Ailpín =

King of the Picts from 858 to 862

King of the Picts
- Reign: 8 February 858 – 13 April 862
- Predecessor: Kenneth I
- Successor: Constantine I
- Born: 812
- Died: 13 April 862; Cinnbelachoir (modern-day Scone)
- Burial: Iona
- Issue: Giric?
- House: Alpin
- Father: Alpín mac Echdach

Domnall mac Ailpín (Modern Gaelic: Dòmhnall mac Ailpein), anglicised sometimes as Donald MacAlpin and known in most modern regnal lists as Donald I (812 – 13 April 862), was King of the Picts from 858 to 862. He followed his brother Kenneth I to the Pictish throne. He was posthumously given the epithet "Drechruaidh" (of the Ruddy Countenance) by the Duan Albanach.

== Reign ==
The Chronicle of the Kings of Alba says that Domnall reigned for four years, matching the notices in the Annals of Ulster of his brother's death on 8 February 858 and his own in April 862. The Chronicle notes:

In his time the Gaels with their king made the rights and laws of the kingdom, [that are called the laws] of Aed, Eochaid's son, in Forteviot.

The laws of Áed Find are entirely lost, but it has been assumed that, like the laws attributed to Giric of Scotland and Constantine II (Causantín mac Áeda), these related to the church and in particular to granting the privileges and immunities common elsewhere. The significance of Forteviot as the site of this law-making, along with Kenneth's death there and Constantine's later gathering at nearby Scone, may point to this as being the heartland of the sons of Alpín's support.

The Chronicle of Melrose says of Domnall, "in war he was a vigorous soldier ... he is said to have been assassinated at Scone." No other source reports Domnall's death by violence.

The Prophecy of Berchán may refer to Domnall in stanzas 123–124:

Evil will be Scotland's lot because of [the death of Kenneth MacAlpin]; long will it be till his like will come. A long while till the king takes [sovereignty], the wanton son of the foreign wife (?). He will be three years in the kingdom, and three months (although thou countest them). His tomb-stone will be above Loch Awe. He dies of disease.

Although Domnall is generally supposed to have been childless, it has been suggested that Giric was a son of Domnall, reading his patronym as mac Domnaill rather than the commonly supposed mac Dúngail. This, however, is not widely accepted.

Domnall died, either at the palace of Cinnbelachoir (location unknown), or at Rathinveralmond (also unknown, and maybe the same place, presumed to be near the junction of the Almond and the Tay, near Scone). He was buried on Iona.

== See also ==
- Kingdom of Alba
- Origins of the Kingdom of Alba

== Sources ==
- Anderson, Alan Orr; Early Sources of Scottish History A.D. 500–1286, volume 1, Reprinted with corrections, Paul Watkins, Stamford, 1990. ISBN 1-871615-03-8
- Duncan, A. A. M.; The Kingship of the Scots 842–1292: Succession and Independence, Edinburgh University Press, Edinburgh, 2002. ISBN 0-7486-1626-8
- Smyth, Alfred P.; Warlords and Holy Men: Scotland A.D. 80–1000, Edinburgh University Press, Edinburgh, 1984. ISBN 0-7486-0100-7

Domnall mac Ailpín House of Alpin Died: 13 April 862
Regnal titles
Preceded by Kenneth I	King of the Picts; 858–862	Succeeded by Constantine I
