= Uurad =

King of the Picts from 839 to 842

King of the Picts
- Reign: 839–842
- Predecessor: Eógan
- Successor: Bridei VI
- Died: 842

Uurad or Ferat son of Bargoit (died 842) was king of the Picts, from 839 to 842.

No two versions of the king lists, known as the Pictish Chronicle, give exactly the same version of his name. Ferat, or Uurad in Pictish, is the most common reading, but Feradach may be intended.

The interpretation of Thomas Owen Clancy of the Drosten Stone would make Ferat one of only two Pictish monarchs, the other being Caustantín mac Fergusa, whose name is read on a Pictish stone.

One version of the origin tale of St Andrews states that it was written by one Thana son of Dudabrach, at Meigle, in the reign of "Pherath son of Bergeth".

His sons may have included Bridei, Ciniod, and Drest, who contested for power in Pictland with kin groups led by Bruide son of Fokel, and Kenneth MacAlpin (Cináed mac Ailpín).

== Sources ==
- Anderson, Alan Orr; Early Sources of Scottish History A.D. 500–1286, volume 1. Reprinted with corrections, Paul Watkins, Stamford, 1990. ISBN 1-871615-03-8

Regnal titles
Preceded by Eógan	King of the Picts; 839–842	Succeeded by Bridei VI
