= Áed mac Boanta =

Irish local king

King of Dál Riata
- Reign: 835–839
- Predecessor: Eóganán
- Successor: Alpín mac Echdach
- Died: 839

Áed mac Boanta (died 839) is believed to have been a king of Dál Riata.

The only reference to Áed in the Irish annals is found in the Annals of Ulster, where it is recorded that "Eóganán mac Óengusa, Bran mac Óengusa, Áed mac Boanta, and others almost innumerable" died in a battle in 839 fought by the men of Fortriu against Vikings.

The Duan Albanach lists an "Áed An" who ruled for four years over Dál Riata and the Synchronisms of Flann Mainistrech place him between Caustantín mac Fergusa and Eóganán mac Óengusa, Caustantín's nephew. It is doubtful whether Caustantín and Eóganán ruled over Dál Riata, but Áed is thought to have done so.

Áed may have been preceded as king by Domnall mac Caustantín. It is not known what kings followed him, if any, before the region fell under the dominance of Norse-Gaels such as the Uí Ímair in the latter part of the ninth century.

Preceded by Eóganán	King of Dál Riata; 835–839	Succeeded by Alpín mac Echdach
