= Alpín mac Echdach =

King of Dal Riata (?)
- Reign: c. 831 - July or August 834
- Predecessor: Áed mac Boanta?
- Successor: Kenneth MacAlpin
- Born: c. 778
- Died: 20 July 834 (or August 834); Galloway, Scotland
- Issue: Kenneth MacAlpin; Domnall mac Ailpín; Eochaid?
- Father: Eochaid mac Áeda Find

Alpín mac Echdach was a supposed king of Dál Riata, an ancient kingdom that included parts of Ireland and Scotland.

Alpín was included in a pedigree chart created in the 10th century to connect the kings of Alba (Scotland) to legendary Dál Riatan and Irish ancestors. In this pedigree, Alpín's father is Eochaid, an Irish name, yet he becomes the father of Cináed (Kenneth MacAlpin) and Domnall mac Ailpín.

Cináed and Alpín are the names of Pictish kings in the 8th century: the brothers Ciniod and Elphin who ruled from 763 to 780. Alpín's alleged father Eochaid IV is not mentioned in any contemporary source.

== Parentage and death ==
The Chronicle of the Scottish historian John of Fordun records the succession of "Alpin the son of Achay" in 831, his reign of three years, and his defeat by the Picts "20 July". The 12th century Cronica Regum Scottorum lists "Alpin filius Eochal venenosi iii, Kynedus filius Alpini primus rex Scottorum xvi…" as kings, dated to the 9th century. Alpín's parentage is not stated in the earlier chronicles.

Alpín's mother was the sister and heiress of Causantín mac Fergusa, King of the Picts. Alpín married a 'Scottish Princess' and fathered two sons.

Alpín is chiefly remembered for his fatal war with the Picts, who had seized upon and arrogated the kingdom. Alpín resolved to remove the king and met him with his forces near a village of Angus, where the fight was maintained with great obstinacy until the Pictish king was slain, whereby the Scots won. However, a new king of "high descent and noble achievements" (possibly Drest) was elected king of the Picts, turned the scale, and at Galloway defeated and took King Alpín, anno 834, and put him with many of his nobles to death. It is said that Alpín's head was fastened to a pole, and carried about the Pictish army, and at last set up for spectacle in Abernethy, their chief town, which was afterwards severely revenged by the Scots, who called the place where he was slain Bas Alpin.

Alpín died on 20 July or in August 834 when he was either killed while fighting the Picts in Galloway or beheaded after the battle. His place of burial is not recorded. His son Kenneth MacAlpin succeeded him.
