= Kenneth MacAlpin =

King of the Picts from 848 to 858

Kenneth MacAlpin Cináed mac Ailpín

King of the Picts
- Reign: 848 – 8 February 858
- Predecessor: Drest X
- Successor: Donald I

King of Dál Riada
- Reign: 841–850
- Predecessor: Alpín mac Echdach
- Successor: Title disestablished
- Born: c. 810; Most likely Iona
- Died: 8 February 858 (aged 47-48); Forteviot, Perthshire, Scotland
- Cause of death: Tumor
- Burial: Iona Abbey
- Issue: Causantín mac Cináeda; Áed mac Cináeda; Máel Muire ingen Cináeda; Unknown daughter
Regnal name
- Kenneth I
Posthumous name
- An Ferbasach
- Medieval Gaelic: Cináed mac Ailpín
- House: Alpín
- Father: Alpín mac Echdach
- Religion: Catholic

Kenneth MacAlpin (Note: Medieval Gaelic: Cináed mac Ailpín; Scottish Gaelic: Coinneach mac Ailpein; Cináed mac Ailpín is the Mediaeval Gaelic form. A more accurate rendering in modern Gaelic would be Cionaodh mac Ailpein since Coinneach is historically a separate name. In the modern language, however, both names have converged.) (c. 810 – 8 February 858) or Kenneth I was King of Dál Riada (841–850), and King of the Picts (848–858), of likely Gaelic origin. According to the traditional account, he inherited the throne of Dál Riada from his father Alpín mac Echdach, founder of the Alpínid dynasty. Kenneth I conquered the kingdom of the Picts in 843–850 and began a campaign to seize all of Scotland and assimilate the Picts, for which he was posthumously given the epithet An Ferbasach ("The Conqueror"). He fought the Britons of the Kingdom of Strathclyde and the invading Vikings from Scandinavia. Forteviot became the capital of his kingdom and Kenneth relocated relics, including the Stone of Scone from the abandoned abbey on Iona, to his new domain.

Kenneth I is traditionally considered the founder of Scotland, which was then known as Alba in Gaelic, although like his immediate successors, he bore the title of King of the Picts. It was Donald II that first bore the title of King of Alba as recorded by the Annals of Ulster and the Chronicon Scotorum. One chronicle calls Kenneth the first Scottish lawgiver but there is no information about the laws he passed.

The current academic consensus (see Professor Alex Woolf's From Pictland to Alba) is that Kenneth I was not the first king of Alba (Scotland). The Chronicles of the Kings of Alba have his son Aed as the last King of Picts and his grandson Constantine II as first king of Alba. It is argued that the references to Kenneth I being the first king were added in Constantine's reign to give the new kingdom Alba more legitimacy.

== Origin ==
According to the genealogy of the Scottish kings, Kenneth's father was Alpín mac Echdach, the King of Dál Riada, which existed in what is now western Scotland. Alpín is considered to be the grandson of Áed Find, a descendant of Cenél nGabráin, who ruled in Dál Riada. The Synchronism of the Irish Kings lists Alpín among the kings of Scotland. (Note: Dál Riada was ruled by three royal dynasties. Cenél nGabráin ruled the southern part of present-day Argyll and a part of Antrim. The Loarn clan ruled the central provinces of the kingdom, while the Óengus clan ruled the islands within the realm.) Modern historians are sceptical about the reign of Alpín in Dál Riada and his relationship with Áed, and believe this misconception is the result of negligence on the part of the scribes in some texts. The genealogy of the kings of Scotland and Dál Riada dates back to an original manuscript that was written during the reign of Malcolm III in the mid-to-late 11th century. The Rawlinson B 502 manuscript provides the following ancestry for Kenneth:

...Cináed son of Alpín son of Eochaid son of Áed Find son of Domangart son of Domnall Brecc son of Eochaid Buide son of Áedán son of Gabrán son of Domangart son of Fergus Mór ...

There is very limited information about Alpín, Kenneth's father. Some of Dál Riada's royal lists, which contain many scribal errors, say he ruled from 841 to 843. The Chronicle of Huntingdon, which was written in the late 13th century, states Alpín defeated the Picts at Galloway but the Picts then defeated him in a battle that took place in the same year, during which Alpín was killed. According to the chronicle, Alpín died on 20 July 834. This date is given in other sources but several researchers claim the date was probably copied from another source and the year of his death was obtained by recalculating the dates in the erroneous royal lists so they attribute Alpín's date of death to 840 or 841.

Kenneth's grandmother (Alpin's mother), is said to have been a Pictish princess, the sister of Constantine I and Óengus II. According to the Pictish tradition, a female representative of the royal dynasty could inherit the crown. This origin gave Kenneth a legitimate claim to the Pictish throne.

Kenneth I had at least one brother, Donald I, who succeeded him as king.

== Life and reign ==
=== Early years ===
Kenneth MacAlpin is believed to have been born around 810 on the island of Iona, which is part of modern-day Scotland. After his father's death, Kenneth succeeded him as the King of Dál Riada. His coronation took place in 840 or 841. One of the main sources on Kenneth's life is the 10th century Chronicle of the Kings of Alba which describes the reigns of Scottish kings from Kenneth I to Kenneth II (r. 971–995).

=== Conquest of Pictavia ===
According to the Chronicle of the Kings of Alba, Kenneth came to a region that was inhabited by the Picts, during the second year of his reign in Dál Riada. Having defeated the Picts, Kenneth ruled there for 16 years. According to the Annals of Ulster, compiled in the 15th century, he became the King of the Picts in 842 or 843 and died in 858. Although some sources state Kenneth ruled the Picts from 841 to 856, according to the Chronicle of Melrose, he became king in 843, a date that is generally accepted by most modern-day historians.

In the first half of the 9th century, the geopolitical situation in Dál Riada deteriorated. Almost the entire territory of the kingdom was mountainous and was filled with uneasy terrain. Kenneth's realm lay between the powerful Kingdom of Strathclyde in the south and the Druim Alban mountain ridge in the east. It was difficult to pass through the provinces of Dál Riada, most of the land was infertile, and the kingdom had lost its western territories in the Hebrides to the Vikings, who had settled in the area and were raiding the borders of Dál Riada. These conditions may have forced Kenneth to attack the Picts.

After the death of Eóganan mac Óengusa in the Battle of 839, Uurad, and then Bridei VI succeeded him as the King of the Picts. According to List One, (Note: There are eight lists of the Pictish kings, which are based on two protographs labelled List One and List Two respectively.) Uurad's reign lasted three years, while Bridei VI reigned for a year. According to List Two, Uurad reigned for two years, while Bridei VI's reign lasted a month. The reigns of Uurad's three sons were also present in List Two. Based on these accounts, the Pictish kingdom fell in 849 or 850. Many sources dating to the following periods state that the historical kingdom of the Picts and the Scots unified in 850. List Two states that the last Pictish King was killed in Forteviot or Scone. This is probably a reference to MacAlpin's treason, a medieval legend first recorded in the 12th century by Giraldus Cambrensis. According to the legend, a Pictish nobleman is invited by the Scots to a meeting or a feast in Scone and is treacherously killed there. At the same time, List One gives the year 843 as the date when Kenneth received the title of King of the Picts.

Sources do not detail Kenneth's conquest of Pictavia. (Note: Edward J. Cowan, based on handwritten versions of royal lists compiled in the 12th century, suggested that the description of the conquest of the Pictish kingdom existed in an earlier protograph but it was later removed from the lists.) No chronicle mentions either Kenneth's continuing his father's campaign against the Picts or his supposed claim to the Pictish crown. Modern-day historians suggest Kenneth was a descendant of Pictish kings through his mother or had ties with them through his wife. Kenneth's grandmother (Alpin's mother), was also said to have been a Pictish princess, the sister of Constantine I and Óengus II. It is likely the death of Eógananhe, Chronicle of Huntingdon gives the following interpretation of the events that took place after Eóganan's death:

Kynadius [Kenneth] succeeded his father Alpin in his kingdom, and that in the seventh year of his reign [the year 839], while the Danish pirates, having occupied the Pictish shores, had crushed the Picts, who were defending themselves, with a great slaughter, Kynadius, passing into their remaining territories, turned his arms against them, and having slain many, compelled them to take flight, and was the first king of the Scots who acquired the monarchy of the whole of Alban, and ruled in it over the Scots.

It is likely Kenneth killed the Pictish leaders and destroyed their armies during his conquest of Pictavia, after which he devastated the whole country. The Annals of the Four Masters record a single battle during Kenneth's campaign, which according to Isabel Henderson, proves the Picts did not show any significant resistance to Kenneth's forces, however, more evidence will have to be presented.

=== King of Alba ===
According to historical tradition, a new kingdom was formed after Kenneth annexed the kingdom of the Picts. This kingdom's Gaelic name was Alba, which was later replaced with Scotia and Scotland. The rulers of the kingdom initially held the title of King of Alba, however in reality it wasn't until at least 42 years after Kenneth's death that the title King of Alba was ever used. Kenneth is retroactively listed in the royal lists dating to later periods as the first King of Scotland; modern historians, however, argue the final unification of the kingdom took place half a century later and that Kenneth's main political achievement should be considered the creation of a new dynasty. This dynasty sought to dominate all of Scotland, under which the Scots assimilated the Picts, resulting in the quick disappearance of the Picts' language and institutions.

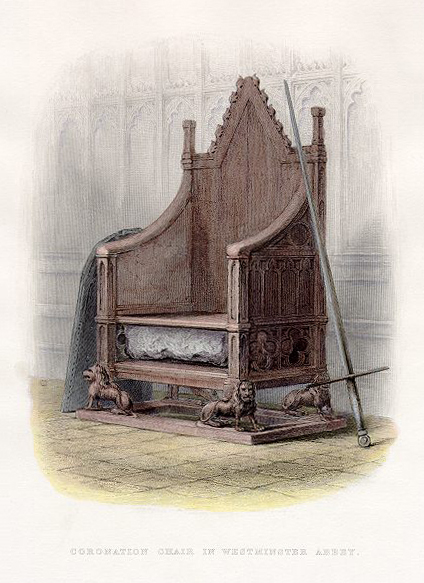
Illustration of the Stone of Scone in the Coronation Chair at Westminster Abbey, 1855

After the conquest of Pictavia, the Scots from Dál Riada began to migrate en masse to the territories populated by the Picts. The list of Pictish kings concludes in 850 and the list of kings of Dál Riada also ends around the same time, meaning the title ceased to exist. Kenneth I and his administration moved to Pictavia; it is possible the Scots moved to the region before the war and that such settlements played a major role in the selection of Scone as the capital of the Kingdom. Kenneth moved relics from an abandoned abbey on Iona, where Viking raids made life untenable, to Dunkeld, which was the centre of the Church of Scotland, in 848 or 849, according to the Chronicle of the Kings of Alba. The coronation stone was also moved from the island to Scone, for which it is referred to as the Stone of Scone. According to archaeological excavations, Forteviot was probably originally a royal residence but the place is not mentioned in the chronicles after the death of Donald I. The mass migration of Scots to the east most likely led to the assimilation of the Picts. Although the Irish annals, which date to the late 9th century, mention the title King of the Picts, the Picts may not have remained independent. The Pictish civil system and clerical laws were completely replaced with the Scottish legal system, and it is likely similar changes occurred in other spheres of the Pictish society. The Picts did not revolt against this assimilation process.

The Chronicle of the Kings of Alba describes the events that occurred during Kenneth's reign without specifying their dates. He invaded Lothian in the Kingdom of Northumbria six times, and captured the towns of Melrose and Dunbar, and razed them. The Celtic Britons from the Kingdom of Strathclyde attacked Kenneth's kingdom and burnt Dunblane. Furthermore, Viking invaders raided Pictavia, ravaging the territories "from Clunie to Dunkeld".

Kenneth strengthened his power by arranging royal marriages with neighbouring states, marrying his daughters to the kings of Strathclyde and Ireland. According to the Chronicle of Melrose, Kenneth was one of the first Scottish lawgivers but his laws have not survived to the 21st century.

== Death and succession ==
According to the Annals of Ulster, Kenneth died in 858. The Chronicle of the Kings of Alba states he died in February in Forteviot due to a tumour. Historians suggest this date might be 13 February, however, the CKA leaves out a part in the text mentioning Kenneth's death: "Mortuus est tandem tumore an[rest uncertain] idus Februarii feria tertia in palacio Fothuirtabaicht." Some speculate the unfinished part is "ante diem", meaning "before the day"; so the chronicle possibly states: "At last he died of a tumor before the Ides of February, on the third day of the week,". The closest Tuesday to 13 February, 858, was 8 February, so Kenneth most likely died on that day. Kenneth was buried in Iona Abbey; succession in the kingdom was carried out in the form of tanistry so Kenneth's successor was his brother Donald I rather than his eldest son. After the death of Donald I, Kenneth's sons, Causantín mac Cináeda and Áed mac Cináeda, inherited the crown. The Alpínid dynasty, which ruled Scotland until the beginning of the 11th century, was formed during this period.

Contemporaneous Irish annals give Kenneth and his immediate successors the title King of the Picts, but do not call him the King of Fortriu, a title that was only given to four Pictish kings who reigned in the 7th to 9th centuries. It is possible the use of the title of King of the Picts was in reference to Kenneth and his immediate successors' claim to all of Pictavia, though there is very little evidence of the extent of their domain.

== Family ==
The name of Kenneth's wife is unknown. There is a hypothesis she may have been a Pictish princess. Kenneth's children were:

- Causantín mac Cináeda (r. 862–877), King of Alba;
- Áed of the White Flowers (r. 877–878), King of Alba;
- Unknown daughter. She married Rhun ab Arthgal (r. 872–878), the King of Strathclyde, and had a son, Eochaid (r. 878–889), who may have ruled as King of Strathclyde and/or King of the Picts;
- Máel Muire ingen Cináeda. She married Áed Findliath (r. 862–879), the High King of Ireland.

There is also a theory the wife of Amlaíb Conung (r. 853–871), the King of Dublin, was a daughter of Kenneth.

== Sources ==
- MacKay, A. J. G. (1892). "Kenneth I.". In Stephen, Leslie (ed.). Dictionary of National Biography. Vol. 30, Johnes to Kenneth. Oxford: Oxford University Press. ISBN 978-1402170669.
- Anderson, Marjorie O. (2004). "Dál Riata Dalriada, kings of (act. c. 500–850)". Oxford Dictionary of National Biography. Oxford Dictionary of National Biography (online ed.). Oxford: Oxford University Press. doi:10.1093/ref:odnb/49278. (Subscription, Wikipedia Library access or UK public library membership required.)
- Anderson, Marjorie O. (2004). "Kenneth I [Cináed mac Alpin, Kenneth Macalpine] (d. 858)". Oxford Dictionary of National Biography. Oxford Dictionary of National Biography (online ed.). Oxford: Oxford University Press. doi:10.1093/ref:odnb/15398. (Subscription, Wikipedia Library access or UK public library membership required.)
- Mackenzie, Agnes M. (1957). The Foundations of Scotland. Edinburgh: Oliver and Boyd. ISBN 9781406706505.
- Goring, Rosemary (2009). Scotland: An Autobiography: 2,000 Years of Scottish History by Those Who Saw It Happen. ABRAMS. ISBN 9781468303124.
- "Genealogies from Rawlinson B 502". CELT. 23 February 2013.
- Skene, William Forbes (1867). Chronicles of the Picts, Chronicles of the Scots, and Other Early Memorials of Scottish History. Edinburgh: Edinburgh General Register House. ISBN 1443788481.
- Dumville, David Norman Dumville (2018). "Gaelic Macro-Genealogy and the Development of an Origin-Legend for the Kingdom of Alba". The Innes Review. 69 (2): 165–170. doi:10.3366/inr.2018.0174. eISSN 1745-5219. ISSN 0020-157X. S2CID 165316641.
- Woolf, Alex (2007). From Pictland to Alba: Scotland, 789–1070. New Edinburgh History of Scotland. ISBN 978-0748612345.
- Osipov, Ju. S.; Кравец, С. Л. (2005). "Алба". Great Russian Encyclopedia (in Russian). Vol. 1. А – Анкетирование. ISBN 5-85270-329-X.
- "Кеннет-Мак-Альпин". Brockhaus and Efron Encyclopedic Dictionary (in Russian). Vol. 82. Saint-Petersburg. 1890–1907.
- Fyodorov, S. E.; Palamarchuk, A. A. (2014). Средневековая Шотландия [Medieval Scotland] (in Russian). Moscow: Dmitrij Bulanin. ISBN 978-5-86007-758-4.
- Henderson, Isabel (2004). Пикты. Таинственные воины древней Шотландии [The Picts. Mysterious warriors of ancient Scotland] (in Russian). Moscow: Centropoligraf. ISBN 5-9524-1275-0.
- Fedosov, D. G. (2014). Рождённая в битвах. Шотландия до конца XIV века [Born in battle. Scotland until the end of the XIV century.] (in Russian). Moscow, Russia: Evraziya, KLIO. ISBN 9785918520819.
- Fraser Tytler, Patrick (2007). History of Scotland. Black. ISBN 978-0371029947.

Kenneth MacAlpin House of Alpin Born: after 810 Died: 13 February 858
Regnal titles
Preceded by Drest X	King of the Picts; 848–858	Succeeded by Donald I
