= Bridei VII =

King of the Picts from 843 to 845

King of the Picts
- Reign: 843–845
- Predecessor: Ciniod II
- Successor: Drest X
- Father: Uuthoi

Bridei (Scottish Gaelic: Brude) was king of the Picts, in modern Scotland, from 843 to 845, contesting with Kenneth MacAlpin (Cináed III mac Ailpín/Ciniod III [son of] Elphin). According to the Pictish Chronicle, he was the son of Uuthoi (or in Gaelic Fochel, Fotel, Fodel).

Regnal titles
Preceded by Ciniod II	King of the Picts; 843–845	Succeeded by Drest X
