= Bridei VI =

King of the Picts from 842 to 843

King of the Picts
- Reign: 842–843
- Predecessor: Uurad
- Successor: Ciniod II
- Father: Uurad

Bridei (Scottish Gaelic: Bridei) son of Uurad was king of the Picts, in modern Scotland, from 842 to 843. Two of his brothers, Ciniod and Drest, are also said, in the king lists of the Pictish Chronicle, to have reigned for a short time.

Regnal titles
Preceded by Uurad	King of the Picts; 842–843	Succeeded by Ciniod II
