= Eochaid mac Áeda Find =

King of Dál Riata

Eochaid mac Áeda Find is a supposed King of Dál Riata found in some rare High Medieval king-lists and in older history books.

Supposedly a son of Áed Find (died 778) and successor to Áed's brother Fergus mac Echdach.
