= Ciniod II =

King of the Picts in 843

King of the Picts
- Reign: 843
- Predecessor: Bridei VI
- Successor: Bridei VII
- Father: Uurad

Ciniod (Scottish Gaelic: Cináed) was king of the Picts, in modern Scotland, ruling circa 843. His name is given as Kineth in the king lists of the Pictish Chronicle. His family's claim may not have been uncontested, and it did not endure. According to the Pictish Chronicle, he was the son of Uurad (also Ferach, Ferech) and brother of King Drest X.

Regnal titles
Preceded by Bridei VI	King of the Picts; 843	Succeeded by Bridei VII
