= Forteviot =

Coordinates: 56.339436°N 3.535103°W

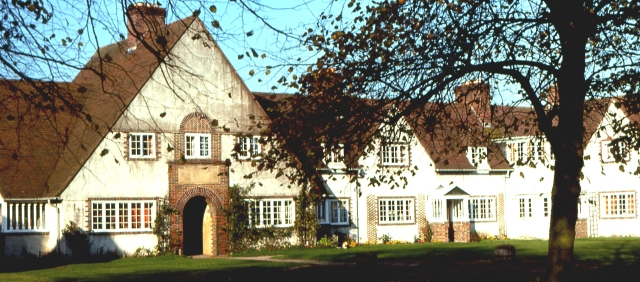
- Houses on the square in Forteviot

- Location within Perth and Kinross
- OS grid reference: NO052174
- Council area: Perth and Kinross
- Lieutenancy area: Perth and Kinross
- Country: Scotland
- Sovereign state: United Kingdom
- Post town: Perth
- Postcode district: PH2
- Dialling code: 01764
- Police: Scotland
- Fire: Scottish
- Ambulance: Scottish
- UK Parliament: Perth and Kinross-shire
- Scottish Parliament: Perthshire South and Kinross-shire

Forteviot (Scottish Gaelic: Fothair Tabhaicht) (Ordnance Survey grid reference NO052175) is a village in Strathearn, Perth and Kinross on the south bank of the River Earn between Dunning and Perth. It lies in the council area of Perth and Kinross. The population in 1991 was 160.

The present village was rebuilt in the 1920s by John Alexander Dewar, 1st Baron Forteviot of the Dewar's whisky family.

== Early Bronze Age ==
On 11 August 2009 archaeologists announced that they had discovered a royal tomb from the early Bronze Age at Forteviot. Along with the remains of the ancient ruler were found burial treasures which include a bronze and gold dagger, a wooden bowl and a leather bag. Archaeologists from Glasgow University and Aberdeen University continue to investigate the finds as part of the Strathearn Environs and Royal Forteviot (SERF) project.

== The Pictish palace of Forteviot ==
Forteviot is known to have been inhabited in the 9th century. King Cináed mac Ailpín (Kenneth mac Alpin or Kenneth I of Scotland) (d. 858), is said to have died in the 'palace' (palacio) there. The palace formerly stood on Haly Hill, on the west side of the modern village, overlooking the Water of May.

The ruins of a castle associated with Máel Coluim III (1058–93) were visible in the 17th century. Several pieces of early medieval sculpture are preserved in the parish church, which is dedicated to St Andrew. The 'Forteviot Arch', an early-9th century monolithic sandstone arch with figural sculpture, discovered in an old bed of the Water of May, west of the terrace on which the village stands, is now in the National Museum of Scotland in Edinburgh. It is likely to have once adorned a royal chapel.

== The village ==
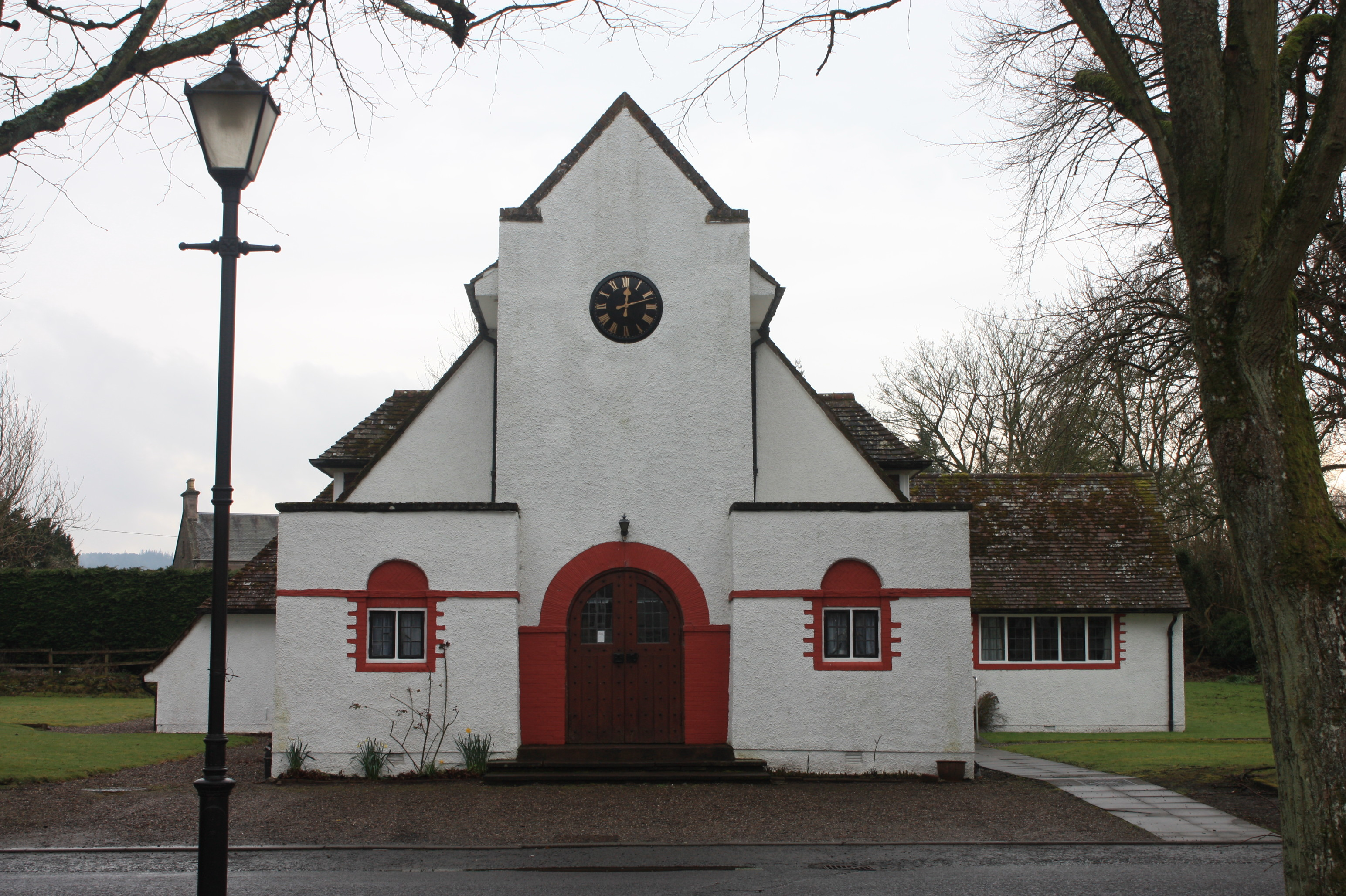
Forteviot Village Hall

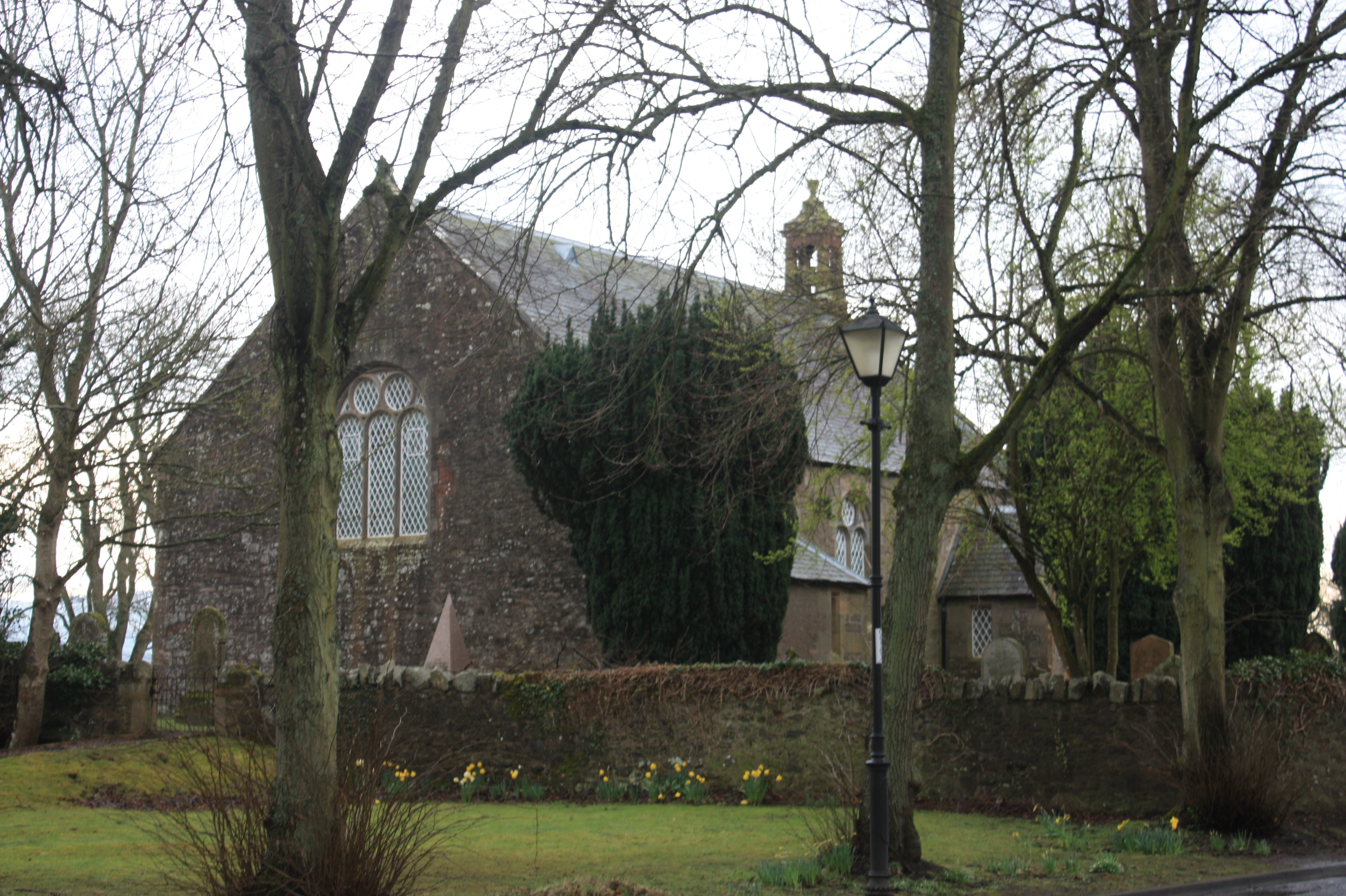
Forteviot Parish Church

The village was rebuilt in the 1920s as a model village designed by the architect James Miller under the instruction of John Dewar, 1st Baron Forteviot, influenced by the Garden City movement. The village hall sits opposite the main village square and is an especially eclectic piece of 1920s design. It is a category A listed building.

The present church dates from 1778 and adopts the form of a Georgian box chapel, but dates from the 13th century. Gravestones date from 1690.

== Notable residents ==
- Very Rev John Inglis, the son of Rev Harry Inglis, was born in Forteviot manse
