= Drest X =

King of the Picts from 845 to 848

King of the Picts
- Reign: 845–848
- Predecessor: Bridei VII
- Successor: Kenneth MacAlpin
- Father: Uurad

Drest (Scottish Gaelic: Drust; Latin: Durst) was king of the Picts from 845 to 848 and a rival of Kenneth MacAlpin (Cináed mac Ailpín). According to the Pictish Chronicle, he was the son of Uurad (also spelled Vurad, Ferant, Ferat).

Drest X was killed at Scone in the event known in history as MacAlpin's Treason. He was the last king of the Picts.

With such scant information about Drest, this detail is enticing:

In the ancient graveyard of St Vigeans in Forfarshire, within which there exist many most interesting early Celtic monuments, there is to be found one old stone which is possessed of this singularity: that on it there is engraved the only inscription in the ordinary character of the Celtic manuscript which is to be found in Scotland outside the bounds of Iona. That inscription has been thus read by the late Sir James Simpson: "The stone of Drost, son of Voret, of the race of Fergus". There is considerable probability that the Drost here commemorated is the Drost son of Ferat and king of the Picts referred to above [i.e., Drest son of Uurad].

Regnal titles
Preceded by Bridei VII	King of the Picts; 845–848	Succeeded by Kenneth MacAlpin
