= 830s =

Decade

The 830s decade ran from January 1, 830, to December 31, 839.

== Events ==
=== 830 ===
==== By place ====
====== Britain ======
- King Wiglaf of Mercia regains control from Wessex, and returns to the throne.

====== Byzantine Empire ======
- June 5 – Emperor Theophilos, 16, marries the Armenian noblewoman Theodora, in the Hagia Sophia at Constantinople. He chooses her during a representation of a bride-show; she becomes empress (Augusta) of the Byzantine Empire.
- Byzantine–Arab War: Muslim reinforcements from Ifriqiya and Al-Andalus (modern Spain) defeat Byzantine forces under Theodotus in Sicily, but a plague once again compels them to retreat to Mazara del Vallo, and evacuate to North Africa.

====== Europe ======
- Emperor Louis the Pious returns from a campaign in Brittany, and is captured by his son Pepin I, king of Aquitaine. He is put under house arrest at Compiegne, and his wife Judith is incarcerated at Poitiers.

====== North Africa ======
- The Ad-dimnah Hospital (bimaristan) is created in Kairouan (modern Tunisia), by the Aghlabid emir Ziyadat Allah I.

====== South Asia ======
- About 830 an Arabian dhow sinks on its journey from China to Arabia near the Indonesian island of Belitung, carrying some 60,000 trade items, the largest collection of Tang dynasty artifacts outside of China (Belitung shipwreck).

==== By topic ====
====== Religion ======
- Nennius, Welsh abbot of Bangor Fawr, compiles the Historia Brittonum. He is also known for the Historia's list of the 12 battles of King Arthur (approximate date).
- Hirsau Abbey (modern Germany) is founded by the Rhenish Franconian count Erlafried of Calw (approximate date).
- Ansgar, a Frankish missionary, visits the trade city Birka, located at Lake Mälaren in Sweden (approximate date).

=== 831 ===
==== By place ====
====== Abbasid Empire and Byzantine Empire ======
- Byzantine–Arab War: Emperor Theophilos invades the Abbasid dominions, and reaches the Euphrates River in north-eastern Syria. He captures and sacks the city of Tarsus, but is defeated in Cappadocia.
- Summer – Muslim Arabs under Caliph Al-Ma'mun launch an invasion into Anatolia (modern Turkey), and capture a number of Byzantine forts. Heraclea Cybistra and Tyana fall to the Arabs.
- Fall – Muslim Arabs reinvade Sicily, and lay siege to Palermo. Symeon, Byzantine commander of the imperial bodyguard (spatharios), surrenders the city in exchange for a safe departure.

====== Europe ======
- Emperor Louis the Pious is reinstated as sole ruler of the Frankish Empire. He promises his sons Pepin I and Louis the German a greater share of the inheritance. His eldest son Lothair I is pardoned, but disgraced and banished to Italy.
- February – Empress Judith stands trial to "undergo the judgment of the Franks" for an assembly arranged by Louis the Pious, and is exonerated.
- Omurtag, ruler (khan) of the Bulgarian Empire, dies after a 17-year reign. He is succeeded by his youngest son Malamir, because his older brother Enravota favours Christianity.
- Nominoe, duke of Brittany, is designated missus imperatoris (imperial emissary) by Louis the Pious, at Ingelheim (modern Germany).

====== China ======
- An Uyghur Turk sues the son of a Chinese general, who had failed to repay a debt of 11 million government-issued copper coins. Emperor Wenzong hears the news, and is so upset that he not only banishes the general, but attempts to ban all trade between Chinese and foreigners except for goods and livestock. This ban is unsuccessful, and trade with foreigners resumes, especially in maritime affairs overseas.

==== By topic ====
====== Religion ======
- Summer – Ansgar, Frankish missionary, founds the first church at Birka (modern Sweden).
- Ansgar is consecrated; he travels to Rome to receive the pallium from Pope Gregory IV.

=== 832 ===
==== By place ====
====== Byzantine Empire ======
- Byzantine–Arab War: The Byzantine fortress of Loulon (modern Turkey) is captured by the Abbasids. Its garrison surrenders to Caliph Al-Ma'mun, after a lengthy siege.

====== Europe ======
- King Pepin I of Aquitaine, and his brother Louis the German, revolt against their father, Emperor Louis the Pious. They gather an army of Slav allies and conquer Swabia.
- Berengar the Wise, count (or duke) of Toulouse, attacks the Frankish domains of Bernard of Septimania, taking Roussillon (along with Vallespir, Razès, and Conflent).

====== Britain and Ireland ======
- The Flag of Scotland: According to legend, King Óengus II of Fortriu leads an army of Picts and Scots, against the invading Angles from Northumbria, near Athelstaneford.
- The town of Clondalkin (modern Ireland) is sacked by Vikings from Denmark, and the monastery is burnt to the ground.

==== By topic ====
====== Religion ======
- Emperor Theophilos promulgates a new edict against the usage of icons in the Byzantine Empire. He establishes strict punishments against idolators, and persecutes violators.
- The second St. Mark's Basilica in Venice (replacing an older church at a different location) is built, and becomes one of the best known examples of Italo-Byzantine architecture.

=== 833 ===
==== By place ====
====== Byzantine Empire ======
- Byzantine-Arab War: Emperor Theophilos signs an armistice for peace with the Abbasid Caliphate. He offers Caliph Al-Ma'mun 100,000 gold dinars, in return for 7,000 Byzantine prisoners.

====== Europe ======
- June – Lothair I, eldest son of Emperor Louis the Pious, joins the rebellion of his brothers Pepin I and Louis the German, with the assistance of Archbishop Ebbo. Louis is forced to abdicate, on the plains of Rothfield (near Colmar).
- Mojmir I, Moravian duke, expels Prince Pribina from his homeland (western part of modern Slovakia). He unifies Great Moravia and becomes the first known ruler of the Moravian Slavs, who founds the House of Mojmir (approximate date).
- Galindo Aznárez I, Frankish count, usurps the Catalan counties (pagi) of Pallars and Ribagorza, in the Spanish March (modern Spain), a buffer zone between the Pyrenees and the Ebro River.

====== Abbasid Caliphate ======
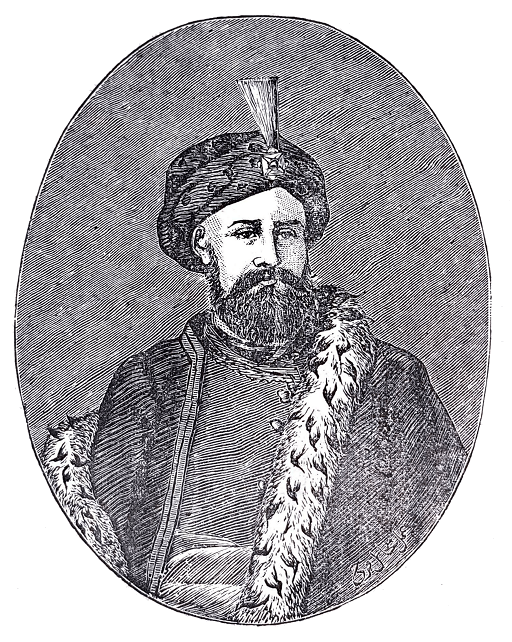
Caliph al-Mamun (r. 813–833) of the Abbasid dynasty

- August 7 – Caliph Al-Ma'mun dies after a 20-year reign. He is succeeded two days later by his half-brother al-Mu'tasim, as ruler of the Abbasid Caliphate.
- Ibn Hisham, Muslim historian, collects oral traditions that form the basis for the biography of the Islamic prophet Muhammad.

====== Japan ======
- Emperor Junna abdicates the throne, after a 10-year reign. He is succeeded by his nephew Nimmyō, as the 54th emperor of Japan.

=== 834 ===
==== By place ====
====== Europe ======
- March 1 – Emperor Louis the Pious is restored as sole ruler of the Frankish Empire. After his re-accession to the throne, his eldest son Lothair I flees to Burgundy.
- Danish Vikings raid the trading settlement of Dorestad (present-day Wijk bij Duurstede), located in the southeast of the province of Utrecht (modern Netherlands).
- Summer – The Viking ship of Oseberg near Tønsberg (modern Norway) is buried in a mound, during the Viking Age (approximate date).
- The first mention is made of the Jona River ('the cold one') in Switzerland (approximate date).

====== Britain ======
- King Óengus II dies after a 14-year reign. He is succeeded by his nephew Drest IX, as ruler of the Picts.

==== By topic ====
====== Religion ======
- July 20 – Ansegisus, Frankish abbot and advisor of former emperor Charlemagne, dies at Fontenelle Abbey in Normandy (or 833).

=== 835 ===
==== By place ====
====== Europe ======
- Ragnar Lodbrok, a Norse Viking ruler, rises to power. He becomes the scourge of France and England (approximate date).
- Vikings raid Ireland on the Kingdom of Munster, at Inis Cathaigh.

====== Britain ======
- Danish Viking raiders ally with the Cornish, against the rule of Ecgberht, King of Wessex (approximate date).
- The Isle of Sheppey (off the northern coast of Kent) is attacked by Vikings.

====== China ======
- December 14 – Sweet Dew Incident: Emperor Wenzong of Tang plots to free the court from the influence of his palace eunuchs. In the northeast sector of the capital, Chang'an, after the failure of the emperor's chancellor Li Zhongyan to subdue the eunuchs' influence, troops under the eunuchs' command slaughter many officials and other associates.

==== By topic ====
====== Religion ======
- November 1 – Pope Gregory IV promotes the celebration of the feast of All Saints on this day throughout the Frankish Empire.

=== 836 ===
==== By place ====
====== Abbasid Caliphate ======
- Driven by tensions between his favoured Turkish guard and the populace of Baghdad, Abbasid caliph al-Mu'tasim moves his residence to the new city of Samarra, 130 km north of Baghdad. With brief interruptions, the city will remain the seat of the Abbasid caliphs until 892.

====== Britain ======
- Battle of Carhampton: Danish Vikings arrive in the Wessex areas of Somerset and North Devon. Ecgberht, King of Wessex fights them but is forced to withdraw.

====== Europe ======
- July 4 – Pactum Sicardi: Prince Sicard of Benevento signs a 5-year armistice with the duchies of Sorrento, Naples and Amalfi. He recognizes the trade of merchants among the three cities in Southern Italy.
- Malamir, ruler (khan) of the Bulgarian Empire, dies after a 4-year reign and is succeeded by his nephew Presian I. Because of his young age and inexperience, the Bulgarian state affairs are dominated by his minister and commander-in-chief Isbul.
- Pietro Tradonico is appointed doge of Venice (until 864).
- The oldest known mention is made of the city of Soest (modern Germany).

==== By topic ====
====== Religion ======
- The Basilica of St. Castor in Koblenz (Rhineland-Pfalz) is constructed.

=== 837 ===
==== By place ====
====== Byzantine Empire ======
- Byzantine–Arab War: Emperor Theophilos leads a massive Byzantine expeditionary force into Mesopotamia. He sacks the cities Arsamosata and Sozopetra — which some sources claim as the birthplace of Abbasid caliph Al-Mu'tasim — and forces Melitene to pay tribute.
- The Slavs in the vicinity of Thessaloniki revolt against the Byzantine Empire. Theophilos undertakes an evacuation of some Byzantine captives, who are settled in trans-Danubian Bulgaria.

====== Europe ======
- Presian I, ruler (khan) of the Bulgarian Empire, sends his prime-minister Isbul against the Smolyani (a Slavic tribe in Byzantine territory near the Struma River). The Bulgarian army campaigns along the Aegean coasts, and conquers most of Thrace and Macedonia, including the fortress city of Philippi, as recorded in the Presian Inscription.
- The city of Naples (modern Italy) is attacked by Saracens from Egypt demanding an annual payment (approximate date).

====== Britain ======
- King Drest IX dies after a 3-year reign. He is succeeded as ruler of the Picts by his cousin Eóganan mac Óengusa.

==== By topic ====
====== Astronomy ======
- April 10 – Halley's Comet passes approximately 5 million km from Earth, its closest ever approach.

=== 838 ===
==== By place ====
====== Byzantine Empire ======
- July 22 – Battle of Anzen: Caliph al-Mu'tasim launches a major punitive expedition against the Byzantine Empire, targeting the two major Byzantine fortress cities of central Anatolia (Ancyra and Amorium). He mobilises a vast army (80,000 men) at Tarsus, which is divided into two main forces. The northern force, under commander al-Afshin, invades the Armeniac Theme from the region of Melitene, joining up with the forces of the city's emir, Umar al-Aqta. The southern, main force, under al-Mu'tasim, passes the Cilician Gates into Cappadocia. Emperor Theophilos attacks the Abbasids, inflicting 3,000 casualties, but is heavily defeated by a counter-attack of 10,000 Turkish mounted archers. Theophilos and his guard are encircled, and barely manage to break through and escape.
- August – Siege of Amorium: The Abbasids besiege the Byzantine fortress city of Amorium, which is protected by 44 towers, according to the contemporary geographer Ibn Khordadbeh. Both besiegers and besieged have many siege engines, and for several days both sides exchange missile fire. However, a Muslim prisoner defects to al-Mu'tasim, and informs him about a place in the wall which has been badly damaged by heavy rainfall. The Abbasids concentrate their hits on this section, and after two days manage to breach the city wall. After two weeks of repeated attacks, the Byzantine defenders surrender. The city is sacked and plundered, 70,000 inhabitants are slaughtered, and the survivors are sold as slaves.

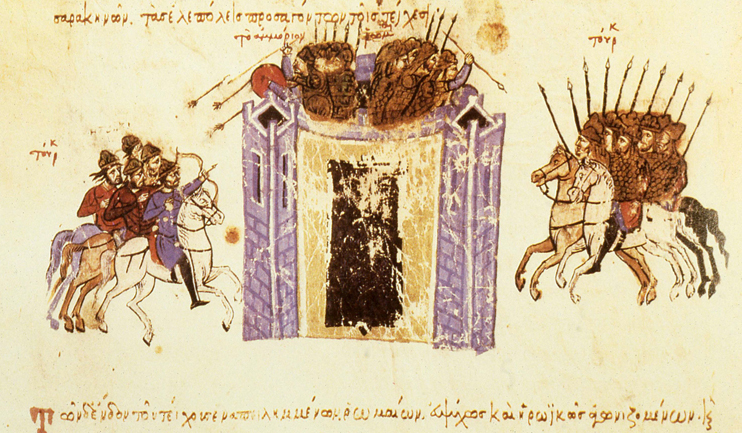
Miniature from the Madrid Skylitzes depicting the Arab siege of Amorium in 838

====== Europe ======
- December 13 – King Pepin I of Aquitaine dies after a 21-year reign. Emperor Louis the Pious appoints his youngest son Charles the Bald as his successor. The Aquitainian nobility, however, elects Pepin's son Pepin II as the new Frankish ruler.
- The oldest known mention is made of the city of Rheine, on the Ems River (modern Germany).

====== British Isles ======
- Battle of Hingston Down: Ecgberht, King of Wessex, leads his men to defeat a combined force of Cornish and Danish Vikings at Hingston Down in Cornwall.
- King Fedelmid mac Crimthainn of Munster calls for a great royal meeting at Kildare (Cluain-Conaire-Tommain) between himself and King Niall Caille of Uí Néill.
- Approximate date – The Stone of Destiny, an oblong block of red sandstone, is placed at Scone Palace for the coronation of the first monarchs of Scotland.

====== Abbasid Caliphate ======
- January – Babak Khorramdin, an Iranian military leader, is brutally executed by order of al-Mu'tasim.
- A conspiracy is discovered, led by General Ujayf ibn Anbasa, to assassinate al-Mu'tasim while he is campaigning, and place his nephew Al-Abbas ibn al-Ma'mun on the throne. A widespread purge of the army follows, which cements the leading role of the Turkish slave-soldiers (ghilman) in the Abbasid military establishment. Ujayf is executed and Al-Abbas put in prison, where he dies.
- The Yazidis rise up against the Abbasids (approximate date).

==== By topic ====
====== Religion ======
- Possible conversion of some Khazars to Judaism (approximate date).

=== 839 ===
==== By place ====
====== Europe ======
- Prince Sicard of Benevento is assassinated by a conspiracy among the nobility. He is succeeded by Radelchis I, chief army officer and treasurer of Sicard, who proclaims himself ruler of Benevento. He imprisons Siconulf, heir and brother of Sicard, in Taranto. But Amalfitan merchants, led by Landulf I, the gastald of Capua, and with the support of Guaifer, rescue him from prison. Siconulf is proclaimed prince of Salerno, and a civil war erupts, which splits the Lombard principality in Southern Italy.
- Third Civil War: King Louis the German, grandson of Charlemagne, invades Swabia. His nephew, Pepin II of Aquitaine, and his Gascon subjects, conquer territory all the way to the Loire.
- May 20 — Thirteen months before his death, Louis the Pious, successor to his father Charlemagne, consents to the division of Charlemagne's empire among his sons in a declaration at Worms. Upon Louis I's death in 840, Lothair (age 45) is devised Middle Francia that includes Switzerland and northern Italy; Louis the German (Louis II), age 36, receives Eastern Francia that includes much of Germany; and Charles the Bald (17) gets West Francia that incorporates most of France.
- The Hungarians (also known as Magyars) who until this time have lived east of the Carpathians, raid the Lower Danube at the request of the Bulgarian Empire against the Byzantine insurgents.
- Approximate date – Danish Vikings return to ravage the Frisian coast (sacking Dorestad for the second time).
- The first official mention of Andorra is recorded, in the manuscripts of the cathedral at La Seu d'Urgell (modern Spain).

====== Britain ======
- Ecgberht, King of Wessex, dies after a 37-year reign, and is succeeded by his son Æthelwulf ("Noble Wolf") as ruler of Wessex. Æthelwulf's eldest son, Æthelstan, is made sub-king of Kent, Essex, Surrey and Sussex, under his father.
- Battle of 839: Eóganan mac Óengusa, King of the Picts, his brother Bran, Áed mac Boanta, King of Dál Riata, "and others almost innumerable" are killed in a battle fought by the men of Fortriu in Scotland against Vikings. Alpín mac Echdach (Alpín II) apparently succeeds Áed.

== Significant people ==
- Al-Mu'tasim
- Louis the Pious
- Egbert of Wessex
- Ansgar
- Wiglaf of Mercia
- Turgesius

== Births ==
830

- Adalard, Frankish nobleman (approximate date)
- Athanasius I, bishop of Naples (d. 872)
- Carloman of Bavaria, Frankish king (or 828)
- Charles, Frankish bishop (or 825)
- Engelberga, Frankish empress (approximate date)
- Irmgard, Frankish abbess (or 833)
- Ishaq ibn Hunayn, Muslim physician (approximate date)
- Junayd of Baghdad, Muslim Sufi (d. 910)
- Kōkō, emperor of Japan (d. 887)
- Lambert III, Frankish nobleman (d. 882)
- Naum of Preslav, Bulgarian writer (approximate date)
- Robert the Strong, Frankish nobleman (approximate date)
- Rimbert, Frankish archbishop (d. 888)
- Rurik, prince of Novgorod (approximate date)
- Wulgrin I, Frankish count (approximate date)
- Yahya ibn Mu'adh al-Razi, Muslim Sufi (d. 871)
- Yunju Daoying, Chinese Buddhist teacher (d. 902)

831

- Wang Chucun, general of the Tang Dynasty (d. 895)

832

- Guanxiu, Chinese Buddhist monk and poet (d. 912)
- Isaac Judaeus, Arab Jewish physician (approximate date)

833

- Irmgard, Frankish abbess (or 830)
- Kocel, Slavic prince (approximate date)
- Luo Yin, Chinese statesman and poet (d. 910)
- Yi Zong, emperor of the Tang Dynasty (d. 873)

834

- Aud the Deep-Minded, Icelandic queen
- Euthymius I, Ecumenical Patriarch of Constantinople (d. 917)
- Lady Shuiqiu, wife of Qian Kuan (d. 901)
- Mo Xuanqing, Chinese scholar
- Pi Rixiu, Chinese poet (approximate date)
- Robert, Frankish nobleman (d. 866)
- Tan Quanbo, Chinese warlord (d. 918)

835

- Ahmad ibn Tulun, Muslim governor (d. 884)
- Ahmad ibn Yusuf, Muslim mathematician (d. 912)
- Guaifer of Salerno, Lombard prince (approximate date)
- Lothair II, king of Lotharingia (d. 869)
- Louis the Younger, king of East Francia (or 830)
- Qian Kuan, Chinese warlord (approximate date)

836

- Æthelberht, king of Wessex (approximate date)
- Al-Musta'in, Muslim caliph (d. 866)
- Fujiwara no Mototsune, Japanese regent (d. 891)
- Ibn al-Rumi, Muslim poet (d. 896)
- Luo Hongxin, Chinese warlord (d. 898)
- Mihira Bhoja, king of the Gurjara-Pratihara Dynasty (d. 885)
- Wei Zhuang, Chinese poet (approximate date)

837

- Al-Muntasir, Muslim caliph (d. 862)
- Baldwin I, margrave of Flanders (approximate date)
- Ibn Duraid, Muslim poet and philologist (d. 933)
- Ibn Khuzaymah, Muslim hadith and scholar (d. 923)

838

- Æthelswith, Anglo-Saxon princess and queen consort (approximate date)
- Fujiwara no Takafuji, Japanese nobleman (d. 900)
- Ubaydallah ibn Abdallah, Muslim governor (approximate date)

839

- Charles the Fat, Frankish emperor (d. 888)
- He Quanhao, general of the Tang dynasty (d. 870)
- Liu Chongwang, Chancellor of the Tang dynasty (d. 900)
- Muhammad ibn Jarir al-Tabari, Persian scholar (d. 923)

== Deaths ==
830

- Æthelwold, bishop of Lichfield
- Ashot I, prince of Iberia (or 826)
- Eardwulf, king of Northumbria (approximate date)
- Egfrid, bishop of Lindisfarne
- Li Jiang, chancellor of the Tang Dynasty (b. 764)
- Sa'id ibn Aws al-Ansari, Muslim linguist
- Wang Jian, Chinese poet (approximate date)
- Zhang Ji, Chinese scholar and poet (approximate date)

831

- July 10 – Zubaidah bint Ja`far, Abbasid princess, wife of caliph Harun al-Rashid, mother of al-Amin.
- December 26 – Euthymius of Sardis, Byzantine monk and bishop
- Omurtag, ruler (khan) of the Bulgarian Empire
- Sadyrnfyw, Welsh bishop (approximate date)
- Yuan Zhen, politician of the Tang Dynasty (b. 779)

832

- March 24 – Wulfred, archbishop of Canterbury
- August 30 – Cui Qun, chancellor of the Tang dynasty (b. 772)
- Feologild, archbishop of Canterbury
- Sico of Benevento, Lombard prince
- Xue Ping, general of the Tang dynasty
- Zhao Zongru, chancellor of the Tang dynasty (b. 746)
- Xue Tao, Chinese poet (b. 768)

833

- May 7 – Ibn Hisham, Muslim historian
- July 20 or 834 – Ansegisus, Frankish abbot
- August 9 – Al-Ma'mun, Muslim caliph (b. 786)
- Conchobar mac Donnchada, High King of Ireland
- Diarmait mac Tommaltaig, king of Connacht (Ireland)
- Dou Yizhi, chancellor of the Tang Dynasty
- Du Yuanying, chancellor of the Tang Dynasty (b. 769)
- Enravota, ruler of the Bulgarian Empire (approximate date)
- García Galíndez (the Bad), count of Aragon
- Nagabhata II, ruler of the Gurjara-Pratihara Dynasty
- Song Shenxi, chancellor of the Tang Dynasty
- Yuthog Yontan Gonpo, Tibetan high priest (b. 708)

834

- July 20 or 833 – Ansegisus, Frankish abbot
- Adelchis I, duke of Spoleto (Italy)
- Cellach mac Brain, king of Leinster (Ireland)
- Fridugisus, Anglo-Saxon abbot (approximate date)
- Gaucelm, Frankish nobleman
- Nasr ibn 'Abdallah, Muslim governor
- Odo I, Frankish nobleman
- Óengus II, king of the Picts
- Robert III, Frankish nobleman (b. 800)
- Wang Chengyuan, Chinese general (b. 801)
- Wang Tingcou, general of the Tang dynasty
- William, Frankish nobleman

835

- Berengar the Wise, Frankish nobleman
- Duan Wenchang, chancellor of the Tang dynasty (b. 773)
- Jia Su, chancellor of the Tang dynasty
- Jayavarman II, founder of the Khmer Empire
- John IV (the Peacemaker), bishop of Naples
- Kūkai, Japanese Buddhist monk (b. 774)
- Li Cou, prince of the Tang dynasty
- Li Fengji, chancellor of the Tang dynasty (b. 758)
- Li Zhongyan, chancellor of the Tang dynasty
- Lu Sui, chancellor of the Tang dynasty (b. 776)
- Lu Tong, Chinese poet (b. 790)
- Muhammad al-Jawad, 9th Twelver Shī'ah Imām (b. 811)
- Sabrisho II, patriarch of the Church of the East
- Song Ruoxian, Chinese scholar, lady-in-waiting and poet (b. 772)
- Shu Yuanyu, Chinese official and chancellor
- Vladislav, duke of Croatia (approximate date)
- Wang Shoucheng, Chinese eunuch and official
- Wang Ya, chancellor of the Tang dynasty
- Yang Zhicheng, Chinese governor (jiedushi)
- Zheng Zhu, Chinese general and official

836

- March 17 – Haito, bishop of Basel
- Adalram, archbishop of Salzburg
- Aznar Sánchez, duke of Gascony
- Herefrith, bishop of Winchester
- Heungdeok, king of Silla (b. 777)
- Lambert I, Frankish nobleman
- Malamir, ruler of the Bulgarian Empire
- Matfrid, Frankish nobleman
- Muhammad ibn Idris, Idrisid emir of Morocco
- Nicetas the Patrician, Byzantine official
- Prosigoj, Serbian prince (approximate date)
- Ralpacan, emperor of Tibet (b. 802)
- Wala of Corbie, Frankish nobleman
- Wang Zhixing, general of the Tang Dynasty (b. 758)

837

- Antony I, patriarch of Constantinople
- Drest IX, king of the Picts
- Eadwulf, bishop of Lindsey
- Giovanni I, doge of Venice
- Hugh of Tours, Frankish nobleman
- Li Zaiyi, general of the Tang Dynasty (b. 788)
- Maxentius, patriarch of Aquileia
- Oliba I, Frankish nobleman
- Peter of Atroa, Byzantine abbot (b. 773)

838

- January – Babak Khorramdin, Iranian leader of the Khurramite uprising against the Abbasid Caliphate, executed
- May 4 ? – Willerich, bishop of Bremen
- June 10 – Ziyadat Allah I of Ifriqiya, Muslim emir
- November 6 – Li Yong, prince of the Tang dynasty
- December 13 – Pepin I of Aquitaine, king of Aquitaine (b. 797)
- Al-Abbas ibn al-Ma'mun, Muslim prince and general
- Boniface II, margrave of Tuscany (approximate date)
- Bran mac Fáeláin, king of Leinster (Ireland)
- Eadhun, bishop of Winchester
- Frederick of Utrecht, Frisian bishop (approximate date)
- Ralpacan, king of Tibet, murdered (approximate date)
- Ratimir, duke of Lower Pannonia
- Ujayf ibn Anbasa, Muslim general, executed

839

- April 21 – Pei Du, chancellor of the Tang dynasty (b. 765)
- June 16 – Rorgon I, count of Maine (or 840)
- Áed mac Boanta, king of Dál Riata
- Aznar Galíndez I, king of Aragon
- Cathal mac Muirgiussa, king of Connacht
- Chengguan, Chinese Buddhist monk (b. 738)
- Cummascach mac Congalaig, king of Brega
- Ecgberht, king of Wessex
- Eóganan mac Óengusa, king of the Picts
- Ibrahim ibn al-Mahdi, Muslim prince (b. 779)
- Muhammad at-Taqi, Muslim ninth Ismā'īlī imam (or 840)
- Muiredach mac Eochada, king of Ulaid
- Sicard, prince of Benevento
- Vache, prince of Kakheti
- Wiglaf, king of Mercia
