= 833 =

Calendar year

833 in various calendars
Gregorian calendar	833; DCCCXXXIII
Ab urbe condita	1586
Armenian calendar	282; ԹՎ ՄՁԲ
Assyrian calendar	5583
Balinese saka calendar	754–755
Bengali calendar	239–240
Berber calendar	1783
Buddhist calendar	1377
Burmese calendar	195
Byzantine calendar	6341–6342
Chinese calendar	壬子年 (Water Rat); 3530 or 3323 — to — 癸丑年 (Water Ox); 3531 or 3324
Coptic calendar	549–550
Discordian calendar	1999
Ethiopian calendar	825–826
Hebrew calendar	4593–4594
- Hindu calendars
Vikram Samvat	889–890
Shaka Samvat	754–755
Kali Yuga	3933–3934
Holocene calendar	10833
Iranian calendar	211–212
Islamic calendar	217–218
Japanese calendar	Tenchō 10 (天長１０年)
Javanese calendar	729–730
Julian calendar	833; DCCCXXXIII
Korean calendar	3166
Minguo calendar	1079 before ROC 民前1079年
Nanakshahi calendar	−635
Seleucid era	1144/1145 AG
Thai solar calendar	1375–1376
Tibetan calendar	ཆུ་ཕོ་བྱི་བ་ལོ་ (male Water-Rat); 959 or 578 or −194 — to — ཆུ་མོ་གླང་ལོ་ (female Water-Ox); 960 or 579 or −193

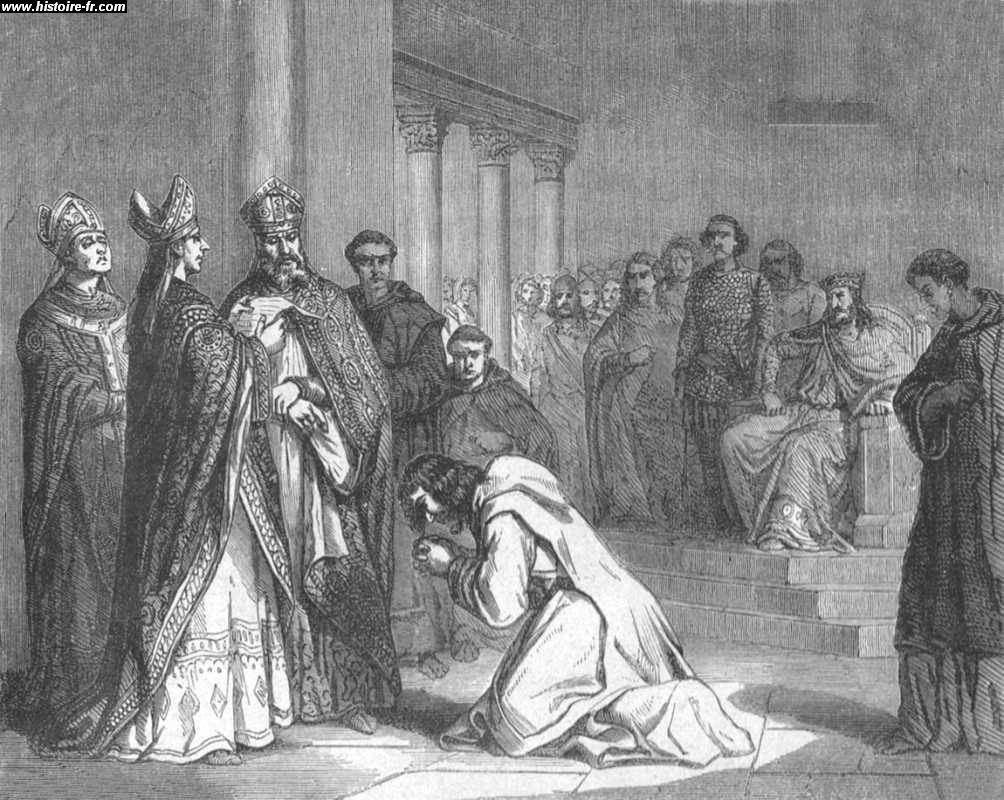
Humiliation of emperor Louis the Pious

Year 833 (DCCCXXXIII) was a common year starting on Wednesday of the Julian calendar.

== Events ==
=== By place ===
==== Byzantine Empire ====
- Byzantine-Arab War: Emperor Theophilos signs an armistice for peace with the Abbasid Caliphate. He offers Caliph Al-Ma'mun 100,000 gold dinars, in return for 7,000 Byzantine prisoners.

==== Europe ====
- June – Lothair I, eldest son of Emperor Louis the Pious, joins the rebellion of his brothers Pepin I and Louis the German, with the assistance of Archbishop Ebbo. Louis is forced to abdicate, on the plains of Rothfield (near Colmar).
- Mojmir I, Moravian duke, expels Prince Pribina from his homeland (western part of modern Slovakia). He unifies Great Moravia and becomes the first known ruler of the Moravian Slavs, who founds the House of Mojmir (approximate date).
- Galindo Aznárez I, Frankish count, usurps the Catalan counties (pagi) of Pallars and Ribagorza, in the Spanish March (modern Spain), a buffer zone between the Pyrenees and the Ebro River.

==== Abbasid Caliphate ====
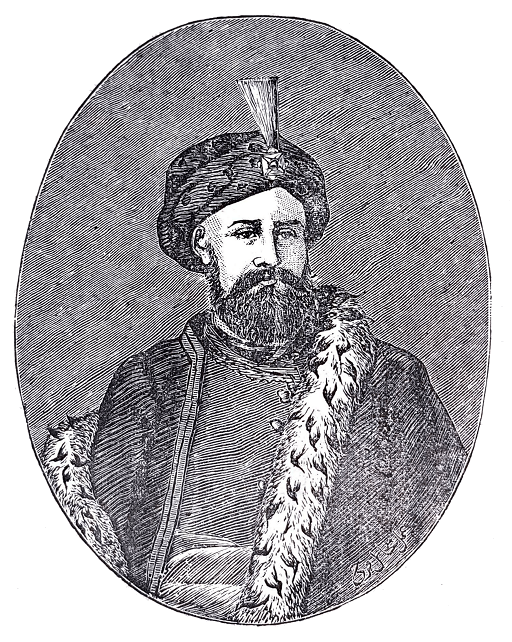
Caliph al-Mamun (r. 813–833) of the Abbasid dynasty

- August 7 – Caliph Al-Ma'mun dies after a 20-year reign. He is succeeded two days later by his half-brother al-Mu'tasim, as ruler of the Abbasid Caliphate.
- Ibn Hisham, Muslim historian, collects oral traditions that form the basis for the biography of the Islamic prophet Muhammad.

==== Japan ====
- Emperor Junna abdicates the throne, after a 10-year reign. He is succeeded by his nephew Nimmyō, as the 54th emperor of Japan.

== Births ==
- Irmgard, Frankish abbess (or 830)
- Kocel, Slavic prince (approximate date)
- Luo Yin, Chinese statesman and poet (d. 910)
- Yi Zong, emperor of the Tang Dynasty (d. 873)

== Deaths ==
- May 7 – Ibn Hisham, Muslim historian
- July 20 or 834 – Ansegisus, Frankish abbot
- August 9 – Al-Ma'mun, Muslim caliph (b. 786)
- Conchobar mac Donnchada, High King of Ireland
- Diarmait mac Tommaltaig, king of Connacht (Ireland)
- Dou Yizhi, chancellor of the Tang Dynasty
- Du Yuanying, chancellor of the Tang Dynasty (b. 769)
- Enravota, ruler of the Bulgarian Empire (approximate date)
- García Galíndez (the Bad), count of Aragon
- Nagabhata II, ruler of the Gurjara-Pratihara Dynasty
- Song Shenxi, chancellor of the Tang Dynasty
- Yuthog Yontan Gonpo, Tibetan high priest (b. 708)
