= 831 =

Calendar year

831 in various calendars
Gregorian calendar	831; DCCCXXXI
Ab urbe condita	1584
Armenian calendar	280; ԹՎ ՄՁ
Assyrian calendar	5581
Balinese saka calendar	752–753
Bengali calendar	237–238
Berber calendar	1781
Buddhist calendar	1375
Burmese calendar	193
Byzantine calendar	6339–6340
Chinese calendar	庚戌年 (Metal Dog); 3528 or 3321 — to — 辛亥年 (Metal Pig); 3529 or 3322
Coptic calendar	547–548
Discordian calendar	1997
Ethiopian calendar	823–824
Hebrew calendar	4591–4592
- Hindu calendars
Vikram Samvat	887–888
Shaka Samvat	752–753
Kali Yuga	3931–3932
Holocene calendar	10831
Iranian calendar	209–210
Islamic calendar	215–216
Japanese calendar	Tenchō 8 (天長８年)
Javanese calendar	727–728
Julian calendar	831; DCCCXXXI
Korean calendar	3164
Minguo calendar	1081 before ROC 民前1081年
Nanakshahi calendar	−637
Seleucid era	1142/1143 AG
Thai solar calendar	1373–1374
Tibetan calendar	ལྕགས་ཕོ་ཁྱི་ལོ་ (male Iron-Dog); 957 or 576 or −196 — to — ལྕགས་མོ་ཕག་ལོ་ (female Iron-Boar); 958 or 577 or −195

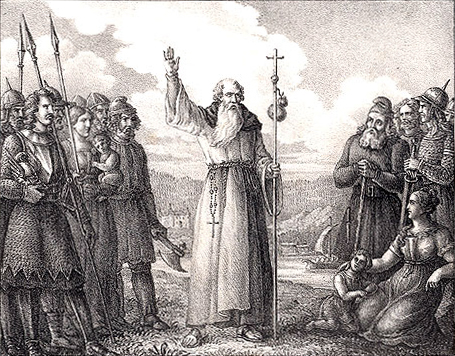
Ansgar brings Christianity to the Swedes

Year 831 (DCCCXXXI) was a common year starting on Sunday of the Julian calendar.

== Events ==
=== By place ===
==== Abbasid Empire and Byzantine Empire ====
- Byzantine–Arab War: Emperor Theophilos invades the Abbasid dominions, and reaches the Euphrates River in north-eastern Syria. He captures and sacks the city of Tarsus, but is defeated in Cappadocia.
- Summer – Muslim Arabs under Caliph Al-Ma'mun launch an invasion into Anatolia (modern Turkey), and capture a number of Byzantine forts. Heraclea Cybistra and Tyana fall to the Arabs.
- Fall – Muslim Arabs reinvade Sicily, and lay siege to Palermo. Symeon, Byzantine commander of the imperial bodyguard (spatharios), surrenders the city in exchange for a safe departure.

==== Europe ====
- Emperor Louis the Pious is reinstated as sole ruler of the Frankish Empire. He promises his sons Pepin I and Louis the German a greater share of the inheritance. His eldest son Lothair I is pardoned, but disgraced and banished to Italy.
- February – Empress Judith stands trial to "undergo the judgment of the Franks" for an assembly arranged by Louis the Pious, and is exonerated.
- Omurtag, ruler (khan) of the Bulgarian Empire, dies after a 17-year reign. He is succeeded by his youngest son Malamir, because his older brother Enravota favours Christianity.
- Nominoe, duke of Brittany, is designated missus imperatoris (imperial emissary) by Louis the Pious, at Ingelheim (modern Germany).

==== China ====
- An Uyghur Turk sues the son of a Chinese general, who had failed to repay a debt of 11 million government-issued copper coins. Emperor Wenzong hears the news, and is so upset that he not only banishes the general, but attempts to ban all trade between Chinese and foreigners except for goods and livestock. This ban is unsuccessful, and trade with foreigners resumes, especially in maritime affairs overseas.

=== By topic ===
==== Religion ====
- Summer – Ansgar, Frankish missionary, founds the first church at Birka (modern Sweden).
- Ansgar is consecrated; he travels to Rome to receive the pallium from Pope Gregory IV.

== Births ==
- Wang Chucun, general of the Tang Dynasty (d. 895)

== Deaths ==
- July 10 – Zubaidah bint Ja`far, Abbasid princess, wife of caliph Harun al-Rashid, mother of al-Amin.
- December 26 – Euthymius of Sardis, Byzantine monk and bishop
- Omurtag, ruler (khan) of the Bulgarian Empire
- Sadyrnfyw, Welsh bishop (approximate date)
- Yuan Zhen, politician of the Tang Dynasty (b. 779)
