= 836 =

Calendar year

836 in various calendars
- Gregorian calendar: 836; DCCCXXXVI
- Ab urbe condita: 1589
- Armenian calendar: 285; ԹՎ ՄՁԵ
- Assyrian calendar: 5586
- Balinese saka calendar: 757–758
- Bengali calendar: 242–243
- Berber calendar: 1786
- Buddhist calendar: 1380
- Burmese calendar: 198
- Byzantine calendar: 6344–6345
- Chinese calendar: 乙卯年 (Wood Rabbit); 3533 or 3326 — to — 丙辰年 (Fire Dragon); 3534 or 3327
- Coptic calendar: 552–553
- Discordian calendar: 2002
- Ethiopian calendar: 828–829
- Hebrew calendar: 4596–4597
- Hindu calendars
- Vikram Samvat: 892–893
- Shaka Samvat: 757–758
- Kali Yuga: 3936–3937
- Holocene calendar: 10836
- Iranian calendar: 214–215
- Islamic calendar: 221–222
- Japanese calendar: Jōwa 3 (承和３年)
- Javanese calendar: 732–733
- Julian calendar: 836; DCCCXXXVI
- Korean calendar: 3169
- Minguo calendar: 1076 before ROC 民前1076年
- Nanakshahi calendar: −632
- Seleucid era: 1147/1148 AG
- Thai solar calendar: 1378–1379
- Tibetan calendar: ཤིང་མོ་ཡོས་ལོ་ (female Wood-Hare); 962 or 581 or −191 — to — མེ་ཕོ་འབྲུག་ལོ་ (male Fire-Dragon); 963 or 582 or −190

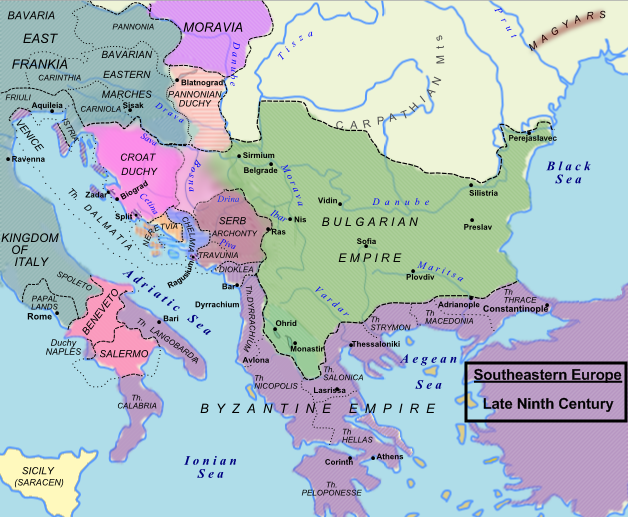
Bulgaria under Presian I (836–852)

Year 836 (DCCCXXXVI) was a leap year starting on Saturday of the Julian calendar, the 836th year of the Common Era (CE) and Anno Domini (AD) designations, the 836th year of the 1st millennium, the 36th year of the 9th century, and the 7th year of the 830s decade.

== Events ==
=== By place ===
==== Abbasid Caliphate ====
- Driven by tensions between his favoured Turkish guard and the populace of Baghdad, Abbasid caliph al-Mu'tasim moves his residence to the new city of Samarra, 130 km north of Baghdad. With brief interruptions, the city will remain the seat of the Abbasid caliphs until 892.

==== Britain ====
- Battle of Carhampton: Danish Vikings arrive in the Wessex areas of Somerset and North Devon. Ecgberht, King of Wessex fights them but is forced to withdraw.

==== Egypt ====
- Egyptian military commander Abdel Wahid bin Yazid el-Iskandarani is appointed vizier of the Emirate of Córdoba in the Iberian Peninsula, rules until 851.

==== Europe ====
- July 4 – Pactum Sicardi: Prince Sicard of Benevento signs a 5-year armistice with the duchies of Sorrento, Naples and Amalfi. He recognizes the trade of merchants among the three cities in Southern Italy.
- Malamir, ruler (khan) of the Bulgarian Empire, dies after a 4-year reign and is succeeded by his nephew Presian I. Because of his young age and inexperience, the Bulgarian state affairs are dominated by his minister and commander-in-chief Isbul.
- Pietro Tradonico is appointed doge of Venice (until 864).
- The oldest known mention is made of the city of Soest (modern Germany).

=== By topic ===
==== Religion ====
- The Basilica of St. Castor in Koblenz (Rhineland-Pfalz) is constructed.

== Births ==
- Æthelberht, king of Wessex (approximate date)
- Al-Musta'in, Muslim caliph (d. 866)
- Fujiwara no Mototsune, Japanese regent (d. 891)
- Ibn al-Rumi, Muslim poet (d. 896)
- Luo Hongxin, Chinese warlord (d. 898)
- Mihira Bhoja, king of the Gurjara-Pratihara dynasty (d. 885) (approximate date)
- Wei Zhuang, Chinese poet (approximate date)

== Deaths ==
- March 17 – Haito, bishop of Basel
- August 21 – Wang Zhixing, general of the Tang dynasty (b. 758)
- August 31 – Wala of Corbie, Frankish nobleman
- October 6 – Nicetas the Patrician, Byzantine official
- Adalram, archbishop of Salzburg
- Aznar Sánchez, duke of Gascony
- Herefrith, bishop of Winchester
- Heungdeok, king of Silla (b. 777)
- Lambert I, Frankish nobleman
- Malamir, ruler of the Bulgarian Empire
- Matfrid, Frankish nobleman
- Muhammad ibn Idris, Idrisid emir of Morocco
- Prosigoj, Serbian prince (approximate date)
- Ralpacan, emperor of Tibet (b. 802)
