= 834 =

Calendar year

834 in various calendars
Gregorian calendar	834; DCCCXXXIV
Ab urbe condita	1587
Armenian calendar	283; ԹՎ ՄՁԳ
Assyrian calendar	5584
Balinese saka calendar	755–756
Bengali calendar	240–241
Berber calendar	1784
Buddhist calendar	1378
Burmese calendar	196
Byzantine calendar	6342–6343
Chinese calendar	癸丑年 (Water Ox); 3531 or 3324 — to — 甲寅年 (Wood Tiger); 3532 or 3325
Coptic calendar	550–551
Discordian calendar	2000
Ethiopian calendar	826–827
Hebrew calendar	4594–4595
- Hindu calendars
Vikram Samvat	890–891
Shaka Samvat	755–756
Kali Yuga	3934–3935
Holocene calendar	10834
Iranian calendar	212–213
Islamic calendar	218–219
Japanese calendar	Tenchō 11 / Jōwa 1 (承和元年)
Javanese calendar	730–731
Julian calendar	834; DCCCXXXIV
Korean calendar	3167
Minguo calendar	1078 before ROC 民前1078年
Nanakshahi calendar	−634
Seleucid era	1145/1146 AG
Thai solar calendar	1376–1377
Tibetan calendar	ཆུ་མོ་གླང་ལོ་ (female Water-Ox); 960 or 579 or −193 — to — ཤིང་ཕོ་སྟག་ལོ་ (male Wood-Tiger); 961 or 580 or −192

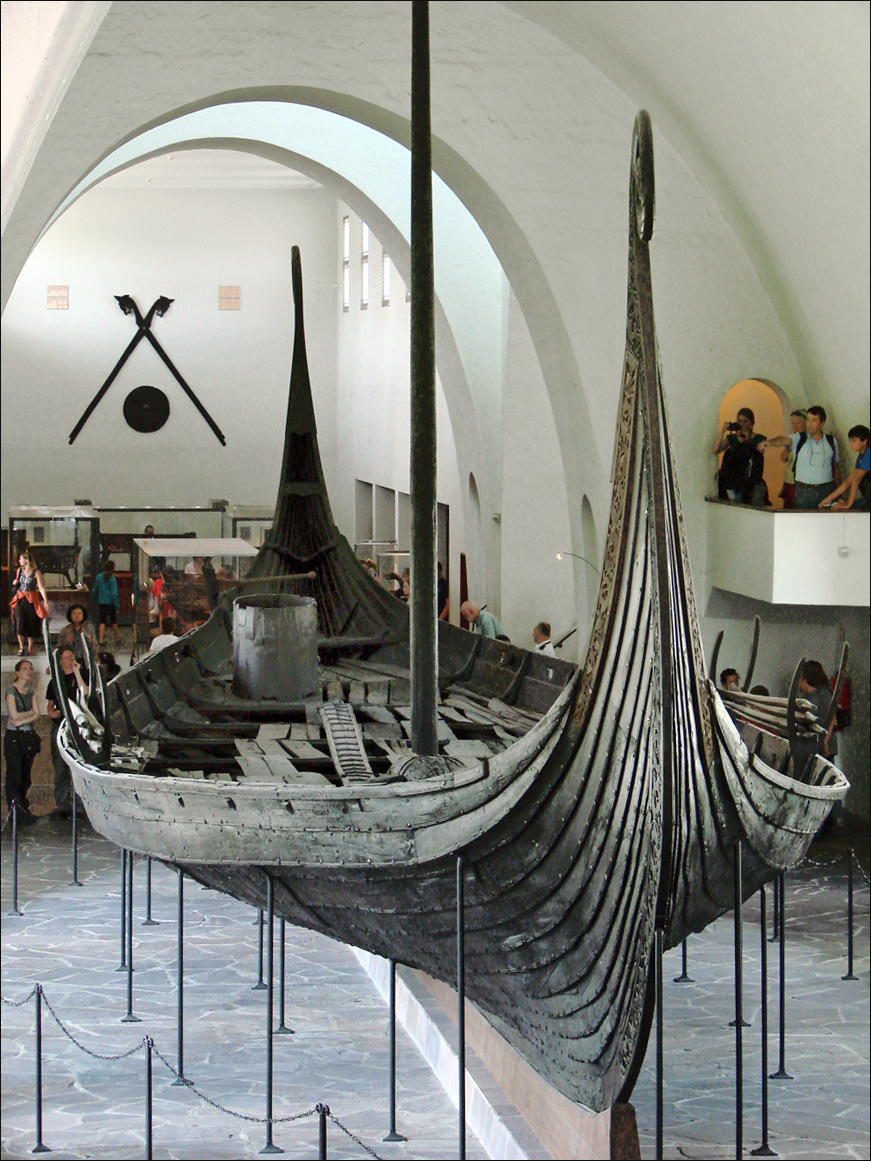
The Oseberg Ship (Viking Ship Museum)

Year 834 (DCCCXXXIV) was a common year starting on Thursday of the Julian calendar.

== Events ==
=== By place ===
==== Europe ====
- March 1 – Emperor Louis the Pious is restored as sole ruler of the Frankish Empire. After his re-accession to the throne, his eldest son Lothair I flees to Burgundy.
- Danish Vikings raid the trading settlement of Dorestad (present-day Wijk bij Duurstede), located in the southeast of the province of Utrecht (modern Netherlands).
- Summer – The Viking ship of Oseberg near Tønsberg (modern Norway) is buried in a mound, during the Viking Age (approximate date).
- The first mention is made of the Jona River ('the cold one') in Switzerland (approximate date).

==== Britain ====
- King Óengus II dies after a 14-year reign. He is succeeded by his nephew Drest IX, as ruler of the Picts.

=== By topic ===
==== Religion ====
- July 20 – Ansegisus, Frankish abbot and advisor of former emperor Charlemagne, dies at Fontenelle Abbey in Normandy (or 833).

== Births ==
- Aud the Deep-Minded, Icelandic queen
- Euthymius I, Ecumenical Patriarch of Constantinople (d. 917)
- Lady Shuiqiu, wife of Qian Kuan (d. 901)
- Mo Xuanqing, Chinese scholar
- Pi Rixiu, Chinese poet (approximate date)
- Robert, Frankish nobleman (d. 866)
- Tan Quanbo, Chinese warlord (d. 918)

== Deaths ==
- July 20 or 833 – Ansegisus, Frankish abbot
- Adelchis I, duke of Spoleto (Italy)
- Cellach mac Brain, king of Leinster (Ireland)
- Fridugisus, Anglo-Saxon abbot (approximate date)
- Gaucelm, Frankish nobleman
- Nasr ibn 'Abdallah, Muslim governor
- Odo I, Frankish nobleman
- Óengus II, king of the Picts
- Robert III, Frankish nobleman (b. 800)
- Wang Chengyuan, Chinese general (b. 801)
- Wang Tingcou, general of the Tang dynasty
- William, Frankish nobleman
