= 832 =

Calendar year

832 in various calendars
Gregorian calendar	832; DCCCXXXII
Ab urbe condita	1585
Armenian calendar	281; ԹՎ ՄՁԱ
Assyrian calendar	5582
Balinese saka calendar	753–754
Bengali calendar	238–239
Berber calendar	1782
Buddhist calendar	1376
Burmese calendar	194
Byzantine calendar	6340–6341
Chinese calendar	辛亥年 (Metal Pig); 3529 or 3322 — to — 壬子年 (Water Rat); 3530 or 3323
Coptic calendar	548–549
Discordian calendar	1998
Ethiopian calendar	824–825
Hebrew calendar	4592–4593
- Hindu calendars
Vikram Samvat	888–889
Shaka Samvat	753–754
Kali Yuga	3932–3933
Holocene calendar	10832
Iranian calendar	210–211
Islamic calendar	216–217
Japanese calendar	Tenchō 9 (天長９年)
Javanese calendar	728–729
Julian calendar	832; DCCCXXXII
Korean calendar	3165
Minguo calendar	1080 before ROC 民前1080年
Nanakshahi calendar	−636
Seleucid era	1143/1144 AG
Thai solar calendar	1374–1375
Tibetan calendar	阴金猪年 (female Iron-Pig); 958 or 577 or −195 — to — 阳水鼠年 (male Water-Rat); 959 or 578 or −194

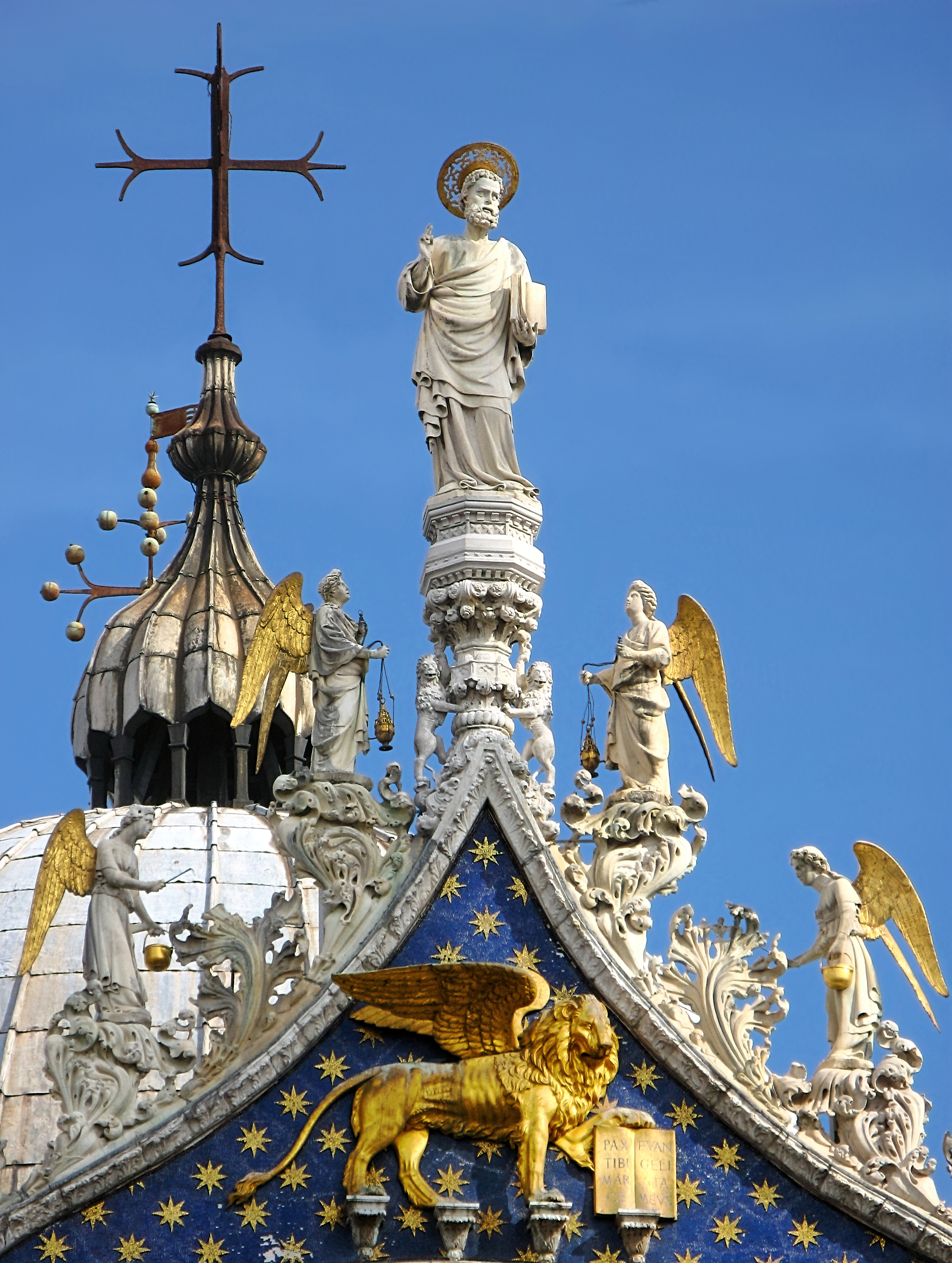
Apostle St. Mark with angels (Venice)

Year 832 (DCCCXXXII) was a leap year starting on Monday of the Julian calendar, the 832nd year of the Common Era (CE) and Anno Domini (AD) designations, the 832nd year of the 1st millennium, the 32nd year of the 9th century, and the 3rd year of the 830s decade.

== Events ==
=== By place ===
==== Byzantine Empire ====
- Byzantine–Arab War: The Byzantine fortress of Loulon (modern Turkey) is captured by the Abbasids. Its garrison surrenders to Caliph Al-Ma'mun, after a lengthy siege.

==== Europe ====
- King Pepin I of Aquitaine, and his brother Louis the German, revolt against their father, Emperor Louis the Pious. They gather an army of Slav allies and conquer Swabia.
- Berengar the Wise, count (or duke) of Toulouse, attacks the Frankish domains of Bernard of Septimania, taking Roussillon (along with Vallespir, Razès, and Conflent).

==== Britain and Ireland ====
- The Flag of Scotland: According to legend, King Óengus II of Fortriu leads an army of Picts and Scots, against the invading Angles from Northumbria, near Athelstaneford.
- The town of Clondalkin (modern Ireland) is sacked by Vikings from Denmark, and the monastery is burnt to the ground.

=== By topic ===
==== Religion ====
- Emperor Theophilos promulgates a new edict against the usage of icons in the Byzantine Empire. He establishes strict punishments against idolators, and persecutes violators.
- The second St. Mark's Basilica in Venice (replacing an older church at a different location) is built, and becomes one of the best known examples of Italo-Byzantine architecture.

== Births ==
- Guanxiu, Chinese Buddhist monk and poet (d. 912)
- Isaac Judaeus, Arab Jewish physician (approximate date)

== Deaths ==
- March 24 – Wulfred, archbishop of Canterbury
- August 30 – Cui Qun, chancellor of the Tang dynasty (b. 772)
- Feologild, archbishop of Canterbury
- Sico of Benevento, Lombard prince
- Xue Ping, general of the Tang dynasty
- Zhao Zongru, chancellor of the Tang dynasty (b. 746)
- Xue Tao, Chinese poet (b. 768)

== Sources ==
- Brooks, E. W. (1923). "Chapter V. (A) The Struggle with the Saracens (717–867)". The Cambridge Medieval History, Vol. IV: The Eastern Roman Empire (717–1453). Cambridge: Cambridge University Press. pp. 119–138.
- Bury, John Bagnell (1912). A History of the Eastern Roman Empire from the Fall of Irene to the Accession of Basil I (A.D. 802–867). London: Macmillan and Co.
