= 866 =

Calendar year

866 in various calendars
Gregorian calendar	866; DCCCLXVI
Ab urbe condita	1619
Armenian calendar	315; ԹՎ ՅԺԵ
Assyrian calendar	5616
Balinese saka calendar	787–788
Bengali calendar	272–273
Berber calendar	1816
Buddhist calendar	1410
Burmese calendar	228
Byzantine calendar	6374–6375
Chinese calendar	乙酉年 (Wood Rooster); 3563 or 3356 — to — 丙戌年 (Fire Dog); 3564 or 3357
Coptic calendar	582–583
Discordian calendar	2032
Ethiopian calendar	858–859
Hebrew calendar	4626–4627
- Hindu calendars
Vikram Samvat	922–923
Shaka Samvat	787–788
Kali Yuga	3966–3967
Holocene calendar	10866
Iranian calendar	244–245
Islamic calendar	251–252
Japanese calendar	Jōgan 8 (貞観８年)
Javanese calendar	763–764
Julian calendar	866; DCCCLXVI
Korean calendar	3199
Minguo calendar	1046 before ROC 民前1046年
Nanakshahi calendar	−602
Seleucid era	1177/1178 AG
Thai solar calendar	1408–1409
Tibetan calendar	ཤིང་མོ་བྱ་ལོ་ (female Wood-Bird); 992 or 611 or −161 — to — མེ་ཕོ་ཁྱི་ལོ་ (male Fire-Dog); 993 or 612 or −160

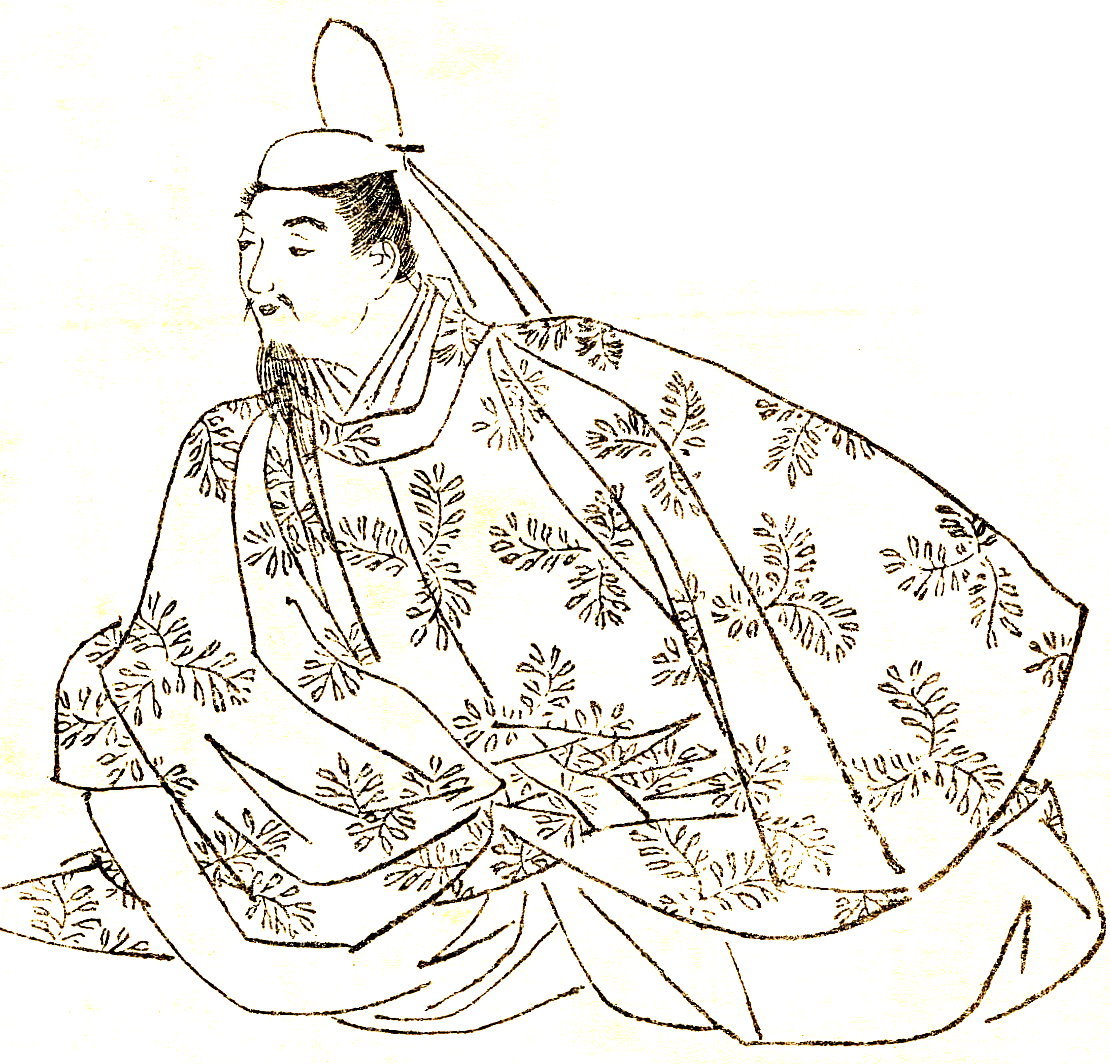
Fujiwara no Yoshifusa (804–872)

Year 866 (DCCCLXVI) was a common year starting on Tuesday of the Julian calendar.

== Events ==
=== By place ===
==== Byzantine Empire ====
- April 21 – Bardas, the regent of the Byzantine Empire, is murdered by Basil the Macedonian at Miletus, while conducting a large-scale expedition against the Saracen stronghold of Crete.
- May 26 – Basil the Macedonian is crowned co-emperor of the Byzantine Empire, and is adopted by the much younger Michael III.

==== Europe ====
- May 27 – King Ordoño I, ruler of the Kingdom of Asturias, dies after a 16-year reign. He is succeeded by his son, Alfonso III, who later is referred to as "Alfonso the Great".
- July 2 – Battle of Brissarthe: Frankish forces, led by Robert the Strong, are defeated by a joint Breton-Viking army.
- Louis II, Holy Roman Emperor, defeats the Saracen invaders who are ravaging southern Italy.

==== Britain ====
- The Great Heathen Army of the Vikings rides north to Northumbria. The Northumbrians are preoccupied with a civil war, and the Danes enter York unopposed.

=== Italy ===
- An army in Lucera is assembled by orders of Louis II in preparation for an attack on the Emirate of Bari.

==== Abbasid Caliphate ====
- October 17 – Caliph al-Musta'in is put to death, after a 4-year reign. He is succeeded by al-Mu'tazz, who becomes the youngest Abbasid caliph to assume power.
- The Kharijite revolt against the Abbasid Caliphate begins in Al-Jazira (Upper Mesopotamia), which will last for 30 years.

==== Japan ====
- Fujiwara no Yoshifusa becomes regent (sesshō) to assist the child emperor Seiwa, starting the Fujiwara regency.

=== By topic ===
==== Religion ====
- Boris I, ruler (knyaz) of the Bulgarian Empire, sends a diplomatic mission, led by the Bulgarian nobleman Peter, to Rome, in an effort to renew ties with the West.
- Pope Nicholas I orders that all Catholics should abstain from eating the "flesh, blood, or marrow" of warm-blooded animals on Wednesdays and Fridays.
- Pope Nicholas I forbids the use of torture in prosecutions for witchcraft (approximate date).

== Births ==
- June 10 – Uda, emperor of Japan (d. 931)
- September 19 – Leo VI, Byzantine emperor (d. 912)
- Carloman II, king of the West Frankish Kingdom (approximate date)
- Robert I, king of the West Frankish Kingdom (d. 923)
- Yao Yi, chancellor of Later Tang (d. 940)

== Deaths ==
- April 21 – Bardas, Byzantine chief minister and regent
- May 27 – Ordoño I, king of Asturias
- June 21 – Rodulf, Frankish archbishop
- July 2 – Robert the Strong, Frankish nobleman
- July 16 – Irmgard, Frankish abbess
- October 17 – Al-Musta'in, Abbasid caliph
- Adelaide of Tours, Frankish noblewoman
- Al-Mu'ayyad, Abbasid prince
- Charles the Child, king of Aquitaine
- Eberhard, duke of Friuli
- Emenon, Frankish nobleman
- Hungerus Frisus, bishop of Utrecht
- Linji Yixuan, Chinese monk and founder of the Linji school
- Liudolf, duke of Saxony
- Ranulf I, Frankish nobleman (b. 820)
- Robert, Frankish nobleman (b. 834)
- Rudolph, Frankish nobleman
- Wang Shaoyi, general of the Tang Dynasty
- Yahya ibn Yahya, Idrisid emir of Morocco
