= 801 =

Calendar year

801 in various calendars
- Gregorian calendar: 801; DCCCI
- Ab urbe condita: 1554
- Armenian calendar: 250; ԹՎ ՄԾ
- Assyrian calendar: 5551
- Balinese saka calendar: 722–723
- Bengali calendar: 207–208
- Berber calendar: 1751
- Buddhist calendar: 1345
- Burmese calendar: 163
- Byzantine calendar: 6309–6310
- Chinese calendar: 庚辰年 (Metal Dragon); 3498 or 3291 — to — 辛巳年 (Metal Snake); 3499 or 3292
- Coptic calendar: 517–518
- Discordian calendar: 1967
- Ethiopian calendar: 793–794
- Hebrew calendar: 4561–4562
- Hindu calendars
- Vikram Samvat: 857–858
- Shaka Samvat: 722–723
- Kali Yuga: 3901–3902
- Holocene calendar: 10801
- Iranian calendar: 179–180
- Islamic calendar: 184–185
- Japanese calendar: Enryaku 20 (延暦２０年)
- Javanese calendar: 696–697
- Julian calendar: 801; DCCCI
- Korean calendar: 3134
- Minguo calendar: 1111 before ROC 民前1111年
- Nanakshahi calendar: −667
- Seleucid era: 1112/1113 AG
- Thai solar calendar: 1343–1344
- Tibetan calendar: ལྕགས་ཕོ་འབྲུག་ལོ་ (male Iron-Dragon); 927 or 546 or −226 — to — ལྕགས་མོ་སྦྲུལ་ལོ་ (female Iron-Snake); 928 or 547 or −225

Year 801 (DCCCI) was a common year starting on Friday of the Julian calendar, the 801st year of the Common Era (CE) and Anno Domini (AD) designations, the 801st year of the 1st millennium, the 1st year of the 9th century, and the 2nd year of the 800s decade.

== Events ==
=== By place ===
==== Europe ====
- April 3 – King Louis the Pious, son of Charlemagne, captures Barcelona after a siege of several months. Bera is appointed first count of Barcelona.
- April 29 – Earthquake in Rome and Spoleto.
- Emperor Charlemagne formally cedes Nordalbian territory (modern-day Schleswig-Holstein) to the pagan Obotrites (allies of the Carolingian Empire).

==== Britain ====
- King Eardwulf of Northumbria leads an army into Mercia against his rival, Coenwulf, in order to flush out other claimants to the Northumbrian throne.
- A synod appears to have been held at Chelsea, as an extant charter (Sawyer 158) records a confirmation of a land grant by Coenwulf, the king of Mercia that was part of the council's proceedings.

=== By topic ===
==== Religion ====
- Rabanus Maurus, Frankish Benedictine monk, takes his vows in the monastery of Fulda and receives ordination as a deacon.

== Births ==
- September 8 – Ansgar, Frankish monk and archbishop (d. 865)
- June 17 – Drogo of Metz, illegitimate son of Charlemagne
- Al-Kindi, Muslim philosopher and polymath (approximate date)
- Wang Chengyuan, general of the Tang Dynasty (d. 834)

== Deaths ==
- Heathoberht, Bishop of London
- Rabia Basri, Muslim Sufi mystic and saint (b. 717)
