= 746 =

Calendar year

746 in various calendars
Gregorian calendar	746; DCCXLVI
Ab urbe condita	1499
Armenian calendar	195; ԹՎ ՃՂԵ
Assyrian calendar	5496
Balinese saka calendar	667–668
Bengali calendar	152–153
Berber calendar	1696
Buddhist calendar	1290
Burmese calendar	108
Byzantine calendar	6254–6255
Chinese calendar	乙酉年 (Wood Rooster); 3443 or 3236 — to — 丙戌年 (Fire Dog); 3444 or 3237
Coptic calendar	462–463
Discordian calendar	1912
Ethiopian calendar	738–739
Hebrew calendar	4506–4507
- Hindu calendars
Vikram Samvat	802–803
Shaka Samvat	667–668
Kali Yuga	3846–3847
Holocene calendar	10746
Iranian calendar	124–125
Islamic calendar	128–129
Japanese calendar	Tenpyō 18 (天平１８年)
Javanese calendar	640–641
Julian calendar	746; DCCXLVI
Korean calendar	3079
Minguo calendar	1166 before ROC 民前1166年
Nanakshahi calendar	−722
Seleucid era	1057/1058 AG
Thai solar calendar	1288–1289
Tibetan calendar	ཤིང་མོ་བྱ་ལོ་ (female Wood-Bird); 872 or 491 or −281 — to — མེ་ཕོ་ཁྱི་ལོ་ (male Fire-Dog); 873 or 492 or −280

Year 746 (DCCXLVI) was a common year starting on Saturday of the Julian calendar. The denomination 746 for this year has been used since the early medieval period, when the Anno Domini calendar era became the prevalent method in Europe for naming years.

== Events ==
=== By place ===
==== Byzantine Empire ====
- Arab–Byzantine Wars: Taking advantage of discontent among the Muslim Arabs, Emperor Constantine V invades Syria, and captures Germanikeia (modern Turkey). He organises the resettlement of part of the local Christian population in Thrace.
- Arab–Byzantine Wars – Battle of Keramaia: The Byzantine navy scores a crushing victory over the Umayyad Egyptian fleet.

==== Europe ====
- Council of Cannstatt: Carloman, mayor of the palace of Austrasia, convenes an assembly of the Alemanni nobility at Cannstatt (modern Stuttgart), and has most of the magnates, numbering in the thousands, arrested and executed for high treason. This ends the independence of the tribal duchy of Alamannia, which is thereafter governed by counts or dukes appointed by their Frankish overlords.
- King Ratchis codifies the Lombard laws, promulgated in Latin, and advised by his council and the Lombard army (approximate date).

==== Britain ====
- King Saelred of Essex dies after a 37-year reign. He is succeeded by Swithred, grandson of the late king Sigeheard. Like his predecessors, he is not an independent ruler, but a sub-king of Mercia.

==== Umayyad Caliphate ====
- August or September – Battle of Kafartuta: Caliph Marwan II defeats and kills Al-Dahhak ibn Qays al-Shaybani, leader of the Kharijites, in Upper Mesopotamia. The rebels withdraw across the River Tigris, escaping destruction.

==== Asia ====
- The Hida-Kokubunji Temple in Japan is built to pray for peace and prosperity (approximate date).
- Jayshikhari Chavda establishes the Chavda dynasty in Gujarat (India).

==== Central America ====
- August 15 – K'ak' Yipiiy Chan Chaak is installed as the new ruler of the Mayan city state of Naranjo in Guatemala and reigns until his death in 748.

=== By topic ===
==== Religion ====
- Guru Rinpoche, Indian Buddhist, travels to Bhutan (eastern end of the Himalayas), to cure the king of Bumthang (approximate date).

== Births ==
- Gao Chongwen, general of the Tang dynasty (d. 809)
- Hui-kuo, Chinese Buddhist monk (d. 805)
- Kirtivarman II, ruler in the Chalukya dynasty (d. 753)
- Zhao Zongru, chancellor of the Tang dynasty (d. 832)
- Zheng Yuqing, chancellor of the Tang dynasty (d. 821)
- Brearley_746

== Deaths ==
- Al-Dahhak ibn Qays al-Shaybani, leader of the Kharijites
- Floribert, bishop of Liège
- Genbō, Japanese scholar-monk
- Maelimarchair, bishop of Aughrim (Ireland)
- Saelred, king of Essex
