= 896 =

Calendar year

896 in various calendars
- Gregorian calendar: 896; DCCCXCVI
- Ab urbe condita: 1649
- Armenian calendar: 345; ԹՎ ՅԽԵ
- Assyrian calendar: 5646
- Balinese saka calendar: 817–818
- Bengali calendar: 302–303
- Berber calendar: 1846
- Buddhist calendar: 1440
- Burmese calendar: 258
- Byzantine calendar: 6404–6405
- Chinese calendar: 乙卯年 (Wood Rabbit); 3593 or 3386 — to — 丙辰年 (Fire Dragon); 3594 or 3387
- Coptic calendar: 612–613
- Discordian calendar: 2062
- Ethiopian calendar: 888–889
- Hebrew calendar: 4656–4657
- Hindu calendars
- Vikram Samvat: 952–953
- Shaka Samvat: 817–818
- Kali Yuga: 3996–3997
- Holocene calendar: 10896
- Iranian calendar: 274–275
- Islamic calendar: 282–283
- Japanese calendar: Kanpyō 8 (寛平８年)
- Javanese calendar: 794–795
- Julian calendar: 896; DCCCXCVI
- Korean calendar: 3229
- Minguo calendar: 1016 before ROC 民前1016年
- Nanakshahi calendar: −572
- Seleucid era: 1207/1208 AG
- Thai solar calendar: 1438–1439
- Tibetan calendar: ཤིང་མོ་ཡོས་ལོ་ (female Wood-Hare); 1022 or 641 or −131 — to — མེ་ཕོ་འབྲུག་ལོ་ (male Fire-Dragon); 1023 or 642 or −130

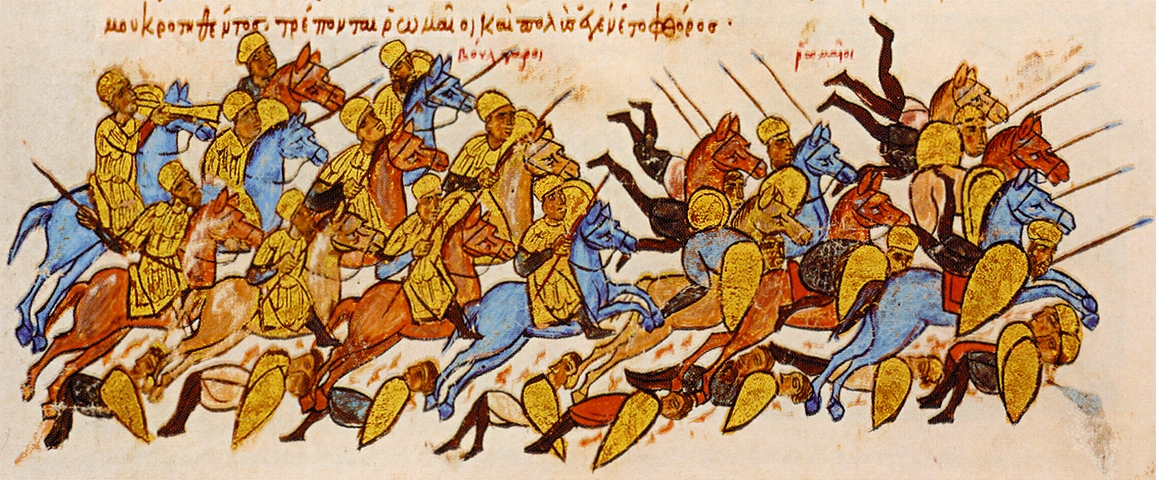
The Bulgarians rout the Byzantine army at Boulgarophygon (from the Madrid Skylitzes)

Year 896 (DCCCXCVI) was a leap year starting on Thursday of the Julian calendar.

== Events ==
=== By place ===
==== Europe ====
- February – King Arnulf of Carinthia invades Italy at the head of an East Frankish expeditionary army. He storms Rome (the Leonine City), and has himself crowned Holy Roman Emperor by Pope Formosus at St. Peter's. Arnulf sets out to establish his authority in Spoleto, but suffers a stroke; he is forced to call off the campaign, and returns to Bavaria.
- March – King Lambert II proceeds to re-conquer Italy. Heading north, he captures western Lombardy, and decapitates count Maginulf of Milan. In the meantime, the deposed king Berengar I recovers Verona (March of Friuli) from Arnulf's candidate, count Walfred of Verona, who dies in office with "great fidelity to the emperor".
- Battle of Southern Buh: Bulgarian forces under Simeon I ('the Great') defeat the Magyars, near the banks of the Southern Buh river (modern Ukraine). The Magyars withdraw from Bulgaria, and are forced to migrate to new pastures. Led by Árpád, they settle in the Carpathian Basin (modern Hungary).
- Summer – Battle of Boulgarophygon: Simeon I invades the Theme of Thrace (in the southeastern Balkans). The Byzantines transfer a new army to Europe, to deal with the Bulgarian threat. The armies clash at Boulgarophygon (modern Turkey); the Byzantines are completely destroyed in battle.
- November – Lambert II and Berengar I agree to sign a treaty at Pavia. Berengar receives the realm between the Adda and the Po, while the rest stays under the control of Lambert (including the March of Tuscany). They share Bergamo, and Lambert pledges to marry Gisela, Berengar's daughter.
- Prince Klonimir, pretender to the throne of the Serbian Principality, is defeated by his ruling cousin, Petar. He is recognized as sole ruler of Serbia by Simeon I, resulting in a 20-year peace and alliance (approximate date).

==== Britain ====
- Summer – King Alfred the Great orders the building of English warships (almost twice as long as the longships) on the Itchen at Southampton, against the Danish Viking raiders in Wessex.
- A Viking pirate army under Hastein (a son of Ragnar Lodbrok) ravages the Welsh kingdoms of Brycheiniog and Gwent (approximate date).

==== Arabian Empire ====
- Kharijite Rebellion: The Kharijite uprising against the Abbasid Caliphate in Jazira is ended. Caliph Al-Mu'tadid reunifies the entire province under central government, and installs his son and heir, Al-Muktafi, as governor.

==== China ====
- Emperor Zhao Zong appoints Li Keyong, a Shatuo military governor (jiedushi), as Prince of Jin. He becomes the first ruler of Jin (see 907) following the collapse of the Tang dynasty.

=== By topic ===
==== Religion ====
- April 4 – Pope Formosus dies at Rome, after a four-year reign. He is succeeded by Boniface VI, as the 112th pope of the Catholic Church.
- April 26 – Boniface VI dies (probably murdered), after a pontificate of 15 days. He is succeeded by Stephen VI, as the 113th pope of Rome.

== Births ==
- Al-Masudi, Muslim historian and geographer (approximate date)
- Liu Hua, Chinese princess and wife of Wang Yanjun (d. 930)

== Deaths ==
- January 18 – Khumarawayh ibn Ahmad ibn Tulun, ruler of the Tulunid Dynasty (b. 864)
- April 4 – Formosus, pope of the Catholic Church
- April – Boniface VI, pope of the Catholic Church
- May 17 – Liu Jianfeng, Chinese warlord
- June 1 – Theodosius Romanus, Syriac Orthodox patriarch of Antioch
- July 3 – Dong Chang, Chinese warlord
- Abu 'l-Asakir Jaysh ibn Khumarawayh, Muslim emir
- Abu Hanifa Dinawari, Muslim botanist and geographer (b. 815)
- Adarnase III, Georgian prince
- Anselm II, archbishop of Milan
- Berengar II, Frankish nobleman
- Cui Zhaowei, chancellor of the Tang Dynasty
- Flann mac Lonáin, Irish poet
- Gerolf of Holland, count of Friesland (or 895)
- Ibn al-Rumi, Muslim poet (b. 836)
- Klonimir, Serbian prince (approximate date)
- Miro the Elder, count of Conflent (Spain)
- Rafi ibn Harthama, ruler of Greater Khorasan
- Rustam I, ruler of the Bavand Dynasty (Iran)
- Sahl al-Tustari, Persian scholar (approximate date)
- Sitriuc mac Ímair, king of Dublin
- Walfred of Friuli, Lombard nobleman
