= 895 =

Calendar year

895 in various calendars
- Gregorian calendar: 895; DCCCXCV
- Ab urbe condita: 1648
- Armenian calendar: 344; ԹՎ ՅԽԴ
- Assyrian calendar: 5645
- Balinese saka calendar: 816–817
- Bengali calendar: 301–302
- Berber calendar: 1845
- Buddhist calendar: 1439
- Burmese calendar: 257
- Byzantine calendar: 6403–6404
- Chinese calendar: 甲寅年 (Wood Tiger); 3592 or 3385 — to — 乙卯年 (Wood Rabbit); 3593 or 3386
- Coptic calendar: 611–612
- Discordian calendar: 2061
- Ethiopian calendar: 887–888
- Hebrew calendar: 4655–4656
- Hindu calendars
- Vikram Samvat: 951–952
- Shaka Samvat: 816–817
- Kali Yuga: 3995–3996
- Holocene calendar: 10895
- Iranian calendar: 273–274
- Islamic calendar: 281–282
- Japanese calendar: Kanpyō 7 (寛平７年)
- Javanese calendar: 793–794
- Julian calendar: 895; DCCCXCV
- Korean calendar: 3228
- Minguo calendar: 1017 before ROC 民前1017年
- Nanakshahi calendar: −573
- Seleucid era: 1206/1207 AG
- Thai solar calendar: 1437–1438
- Tibetan calendar: ཤིང་ཕོ་སྟག་ལོ་ (male Wood-Tiger); 1021 or 640 or −132 — to — ཤིང་མོ་ཡོས་ལོ་ (female Wood-Hare); 1022 or 641 or −131

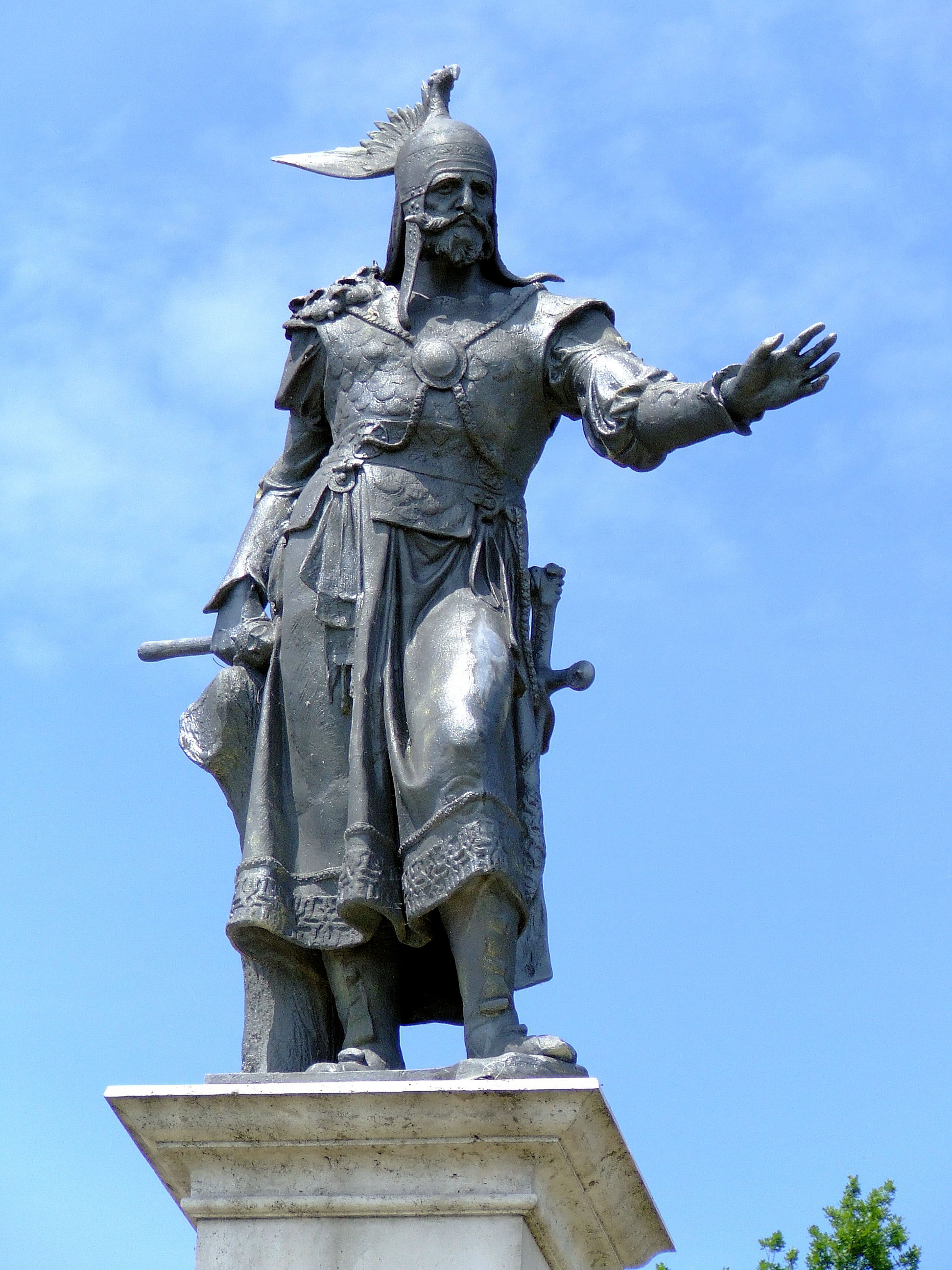
Statue of Árpád at Ráckeve (Hungary)

Year 895 (DCCCXCV) was a common year starting on Wednesday of the Julian calendar.

== Events ==
=== By place ===
==== Europe ====
- The Magyars are expelled from western Siberia, and settle in the Carpathian Basin, under the leadership of Árpád (the traditional date of 896 held during the 20th century has proved to be erroneous). Emperor Leo VI (the Wise) seeks aid from the Magyars, and after crossing the Danube on Byzantine ships, they ravage Bulgarian territory.
- Simeon I (the Great), ruler (khan) of the Bulgarian Empire, seeks refuge in the fortress of Drastar, while the Magyars reach the outskirts of the capital Preslav. Facing a difficult situation with war on two fronts, Simeon calls for a truce. Leo VI sends the diplomat Leo Choirosphaktes to Bulgaria, to negotiate the terms.
- King Odo (or Eudes) takes a large army against Rheims, and forces anti-king Charles the Simple to flee to Germany. King Arnulf of Carinthia, throwing off his agreements with Odo, charges his illegitimate son Zwentibold to invade the West Frankish Kingdom, and re-install Charles on the throne.
- May – Arnulf of Carinthia summons the Imperial Diet in his residence at Worms. Angered by the non-appearance of Charles the Simple, he again supports Odo's claim to the throne of the West Frankish Kingdom. In the same assembly, he crowns Zwentibold as king of Lotharingia.
- Guy IV, duke of Spoleto, conquers Benevento (after the Byzantines have moved the capital of Byzantine Italy from Benevento to Bari). Guy makes himself prince, thereby uniting the two Italian states. The Byzantines attempt to retake Benevento, but are defeated by Lombard troops.
- December – Arnulf of Carinthia invades Italy, at the head of an East Frankish expeditionary army. He arrives in Pavia and reorganizes the Lombard state. Arnulf partitions the northern part of the kingdom: the western half (March of Lombardy) and the eastern half (March of Verona).
- Arnulf of Carinthia crosses the Po River and divides his army in two: one corps (Swabian) proceeds to Florence (via Bologna), while the other corps (Franks) moves through the Lunigiana to the precincts of Rome.
- Spytihněv I, duke of Bohemia, together with the Slavník prince Witizla, breaks away from Great Moravia, and swears allegiance to Arnulf of Carinthia in Regensburg.

==== Britain ====
- King Anarawd of Gwynedd is supplied with English troops, to assist in his reconquest of Seisyllwg (Wales). He is successful, and his brother Cadell is finally able to take his rightful place on the Seisyllwg throne.
- Autumn – King Alfred the Great blockades the Lea River and builds fortifications, trapping the Danish Vikings at Hertford. They abandon their longships and escape to Bridgnorth, located in the Severn Valley.

==== Arabian Empire ====
- Hamdan ibn Hamdun, a Taghlibi Arab chieftain, is defeated and captured by Caliph Al-Mu'tadid at the fortress of Mardin (near modern Cizre). Hamdan's son Husayn enters Abbasid service, beginning the rise of the Hamdanid Dynasty.

==== Mexico ====
- Birth of Topiltzin, future emperor of the Toltec Empire, in Michatlauhco, modern-day Morelos (approximate date).

=== By topic ===
==== Music ====
- The Musica enchiriadis is composed, marking the beginning of western polyphonic music (approximate date).

== Births ==
- March 4 – Liu Zhiyuan, founder of the Later Han (d. 948)
- Al-Muqtadir, caliph of the Abbasid Caliphate (d. 932)
- Gérard of Brogne, Frankish abbot (approximate date)
- Liu Chong, founder of the Northern Han (approximate date)
- Odo of Wetterau, German nobleman (approximate date)
- Sancho Ordóñez, king of Galicia (approximate date)
- Su Yugui, Chinese official and chancellor (d. 956)

== Deaths ==
- May 16 – Qian Kuan, Chinese nobleman
- June 4 – Li Xi, chancellor of the Tang Dynasty
- August 24 – Guthred, king of Northumbria
- October 1 – Kong Wei, chancellor of the Tang Dynasty
- Fujiwara no Yasunori, Japanese nobleman (b. 825)
- Gerolf of Holland, count of Friesland (or 896)
- Hugh, Frankish duke and illegitimate son of Lothair II
- Li Kuangchou, Chinese warlord (approximate date)
- Lu Xisheng, chancellor of the Tang Dynasty
- Minamoto no Tōru, Japanese poet (b. 822)
- Muiredach mac Eochocáin, king of Ulaid (Ireland)
- Wang Chongying, Chinese warlord and governor
- Wang Chucun, general of the Tang Dynasty (b. 831)
- Wang Xingyu, Chinese warlord (approximate date)
- Wei Zhaodu, chancellor of the Tang Dynasty
- Wulfred, bishop of Lichfield (approximate date)
