= 769 =

Calendar year

769 in various calendars
- Gregorian calendar: 769; DCCLXIX
- Ab urbe condita: 1522
- Armenian calendar: 218; ԹՎ ՄԺԸ
- Assyrian calendar: 5519
- Balinese saka calendar: 690–691
- Bengali calendar: 175–176
- Berber calendar: 1719
- Buddhist calendar: 1313
- Burmese calendar: 131
- Byzantine calendar: 6277–6278
- Chinese calendar: 戊申年 (Earth Monkey); 3466 or 3259 — to — 己酉年 (Earth Rooster); 3467 or 3260
- Coptic calendar: 485–486
- Discordian calendar: 1935
- Ethiopian calendar: 761–762
- Hebrew calendar: 4529–4530
- Hindu calendars
- Vikram Samvat: 825–826
- Shaka Samvat: 690–691
- Kali Yuga: 3869–3870
- Holocene calendar: 10769
- Iranian calendar: 147–148
- Islamic calendar: 151–152
- Japanese calendar: Jingo-keiun 3 (神護景雲３年)
- Javanese calendar: 663–664
- Julian calendar: 769; DCCLXIX
- Korean calendar: 3102
- Minguo calendar: 1143 before ROC 民前1143年
- Nanakshahi calendar: −699
- Seleucid era: 1080/1081 AG
- Thai solar calendar: 1311–1312
- Tibetan calendar: ས་ཕོ་སྤྲེ་ལོ་ (male Earth-Monkey); 895 or 514 or −258 — to — ས་མོ་བྱ་ལོ་ (female Earth-Bird); 896 or 515 or −257

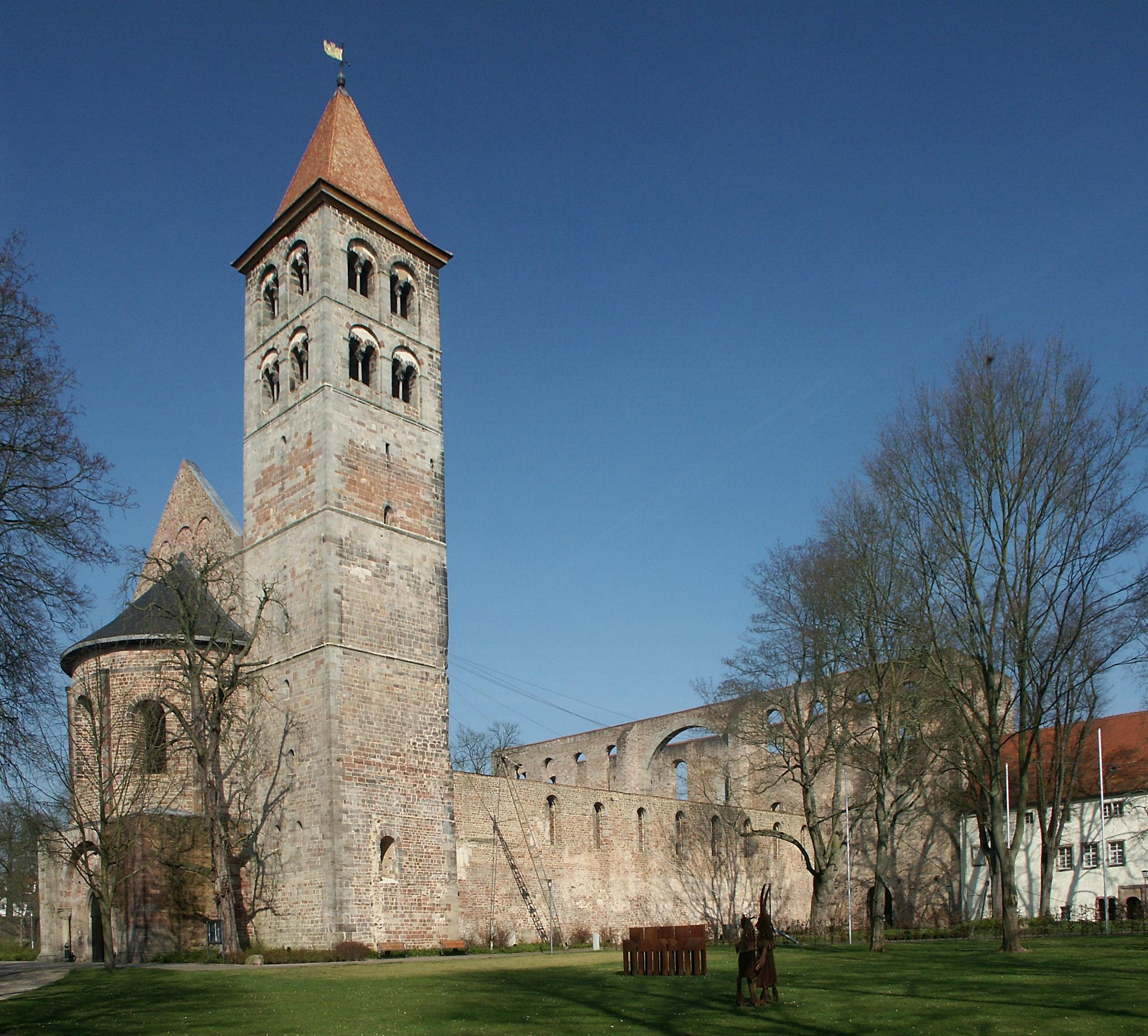
Hersfeld Abbey (modern Germany)

Year 769 (DCCLXIX) was a common year starting on Sunday of the Julian calendar. The denomination 769 for this year has been used since the early medieval period, when the Anno Domini calendar era became the prevalent method in Europe for naming years.

== Events ==
=== By place ===
==== Europe ====
- King Charlemagne (Charles "the Great") begins a military campaign against the Duchy of Aquitaine and the Duchy of Gascony. He leads a Frankish army to the city of Bordeaux, where he sets up a fort at Fronsac. His younger brother Carloman I refuses to help his brother fight the rebels, and returns to Burgundy. Hunald, duke of Aquitaine, is forced to flee to the court of Gascony. Lupus II, fearing Charlemagne, turns Hunald over in exchange for peace, and is put in a monastery. Aquitaine and Gascony are subdued into the Frankish Kingdom.

=== By topic ===
==== Religion ====
- April 12–15 – Pope Stephen III holds a Lateran Council: the papal election procedure (abuse of which has led to the election of antipopes) is changed, and the iconoclasm of the Council of Hieria is anathematized.
- Tallaght Monastery is founded in Ireland by Máel Ruain; it becomes a centre of learning and piety, particularly associated with the Culdees' (Céli Dé) spiritual reform movement.
- Hersfeld Abbey (modern-day Hesse-Nassau), Germany, is founded by Lullus, archbishop of Mainz (approximate date).

== Births ==
- Du Yuanying, chancellor of the Tang dynasty (d. 833)
- Egbert, king of Wessex (or 771)
- Pepin the Hunchback, the first child of Charlemagne

== Deaths ==
- January 14 – Cui Huan, chancellor of the Tang dynasty
- March 9 – Alan of Farfa, Aquitanian scholar and hermit
- December 13 – Du Hongjian, chancellor of the Tang dynasty (b. 709)
- Conchubhar mac Cumasgach, king of Uí Fiachrach Aidhne (Ireland)
- Cuthfrith, bishop of Lichfield (approximate date)
- Dub Calgaid mac Laidcnén, king of the Uí Ceinnselaig (Ireland)
- Gülnar Hatun, legendary Turkish heroine
- Ma'n ibn Za'ida al-Shaybani, Arab general and governor (or 770)
