= 779 =

Calendar year

779 in various calendars
Gregorian calendar	779; DCCLXXIX
Ab urbe condita	1532
Armenian calendar	228; ԹՎ ՄԻԸ
Assyrian calendar	5529
Balinese saka calendar	700–701
Bengali calendar	185–186
Berber calendar	1729
Buddhist calendar	1323
Burmese calendar	141
Byzantine calendar	6287–6288
Chinese calendar	戊午年 (Earth Horse); 3476 or 3269 — to — 己未年 (Earth Goat); 3477 or 3270
Coptic calendar	495–496
Discordian calendar	1945
Ethiopian calendar	771–772
Hebrew calendar	4539–4540
- Hindu calendars
Vikram Samvat	835–836
Shaka Samvat	700–701
Kali Yuga	3879–3880
Holocene calendar	10779
Iranian calendar	157–158
Islamic calendar	162–163
Japanese calendar	Hōki 10 (宝亀１０年)
Javanese calendar	674–675
Julian calendar	779; DCCLXXIX
Korean calendar	3112
Minguo calendar	1133 before ROC 民前1133年
Nanakshahi calendar	−689
Seleucid era	1090/1091 AG
Thai solar calendar	1321–1322
Tibetan calendar	ས་ཕོ་རྟ་ལོ་ (male Earth-Horse); 905 or 524 or −248 — to — ས་མོ་ལུག་ལོ་ (female Earth-Sheep); 906 or 525 or −247

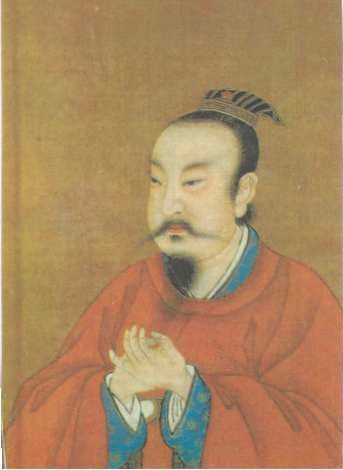
Emperor De Zong (Li Kuo) (742–805)

Year 779 (DCCLXXIX) was a common year starting on Friday of the Julian calendar. The denomination 779 for this year has been used since the early medieval period, when the Anno Domini calendar era became the prevalent method in Europe for naming years.

== Events ==
=== By place ===
==== Europe ====
- Saxon Wars: King Charlemagne assembles a Frankish army at Düren, crosses the Rhine at the modern town of Wesel, and defeats the Saxons in battle near Bocholt (North Rhine-Westphalia). All the main Westphalian leaders are captured, except Widukind. Charlemagne crosses the Weser, Oker and Ohre rivers into Eastphalian territory, where local leaders submit to Frankish rule and hand over hostages. Widukind remains in northern Saxony, and relies on guerrilla warfare.

==== Britain ====
- Battle of Bensington: King Offa of Mercia defeats his rival Cynewulf of Wessex at Bensington (modern-day Oxfordshire). He seizes control of Berkshire, and probably London as well. According to sources of the Anglo-Saxon Chronicle Offa becomes "King of All England". Charlemagne writes a letter to him as "his dearest brother", but when Offa refuses to let one of Charlemagne's sons marry one of his daughters, Charlemagne threatens to close the ports to English traders.

==== Asia ====
- June 12 - In China, De Zong (personal name Li Kuo) succeeds his father Dai Zong, as emperor of the Tang Dynasty.
- March, days unknown - An earthquake in Silla with a magnitude of 6.7–7.0 on the Richter scale kills more than 100 people.

== Births ==
- Agobard, archbishop of Lyon (approximate date)
- Ibrahim ibn al-Mahdi, was an Arab prince, singer, composer and poet (d. 839)
- Jia Dao, Chinese poet and Buddhist monk (d. 843)
- Yuan Zhen, politician of the Tang Dynasty (d. 831)

== Deaths ==
- June 10 – Dai Zong, emperor of the Tang Dynasty (b. 727)
- December 17 – Sturm, abbot of Fulda
- Æthelred I, king of East Anglia (approximate date)
- Fujiwara no Momokawa, Japanese statesman (b. 732)
- Gerard I, Frankish count
- Walpurga, Anglo-Saxon abbess (or 777)
