= Vache of Kakheti =

Prince of Kakheti from 827 to 839

Vache ვაჩე

Prince of Kakheti
- Reign: 827 – 839
- Predecessor: Grigol
- Successor: Samuel
- Dynasty: Kvabulidze
- Religion: Eastern Orthodox Church

Vache (Georgian: ვაჩე) (died 839) was a Prince and Chorepiscopus of Kakheti in eastern Georgia from 827 to 839. He came of the Kvabulidze clan and was installed by the Gardabanian community after the death of his predecessor Grigol. He was succeeded by Samuel.

== Bibliography ==
- Toumanoff, Cyrille (1976, Rome). Manuel de Généalogie et de Chronologie pour le Caucase chrétien (Arménie, Géorgie, Albanie).
- Вахушти Багратиони. История царства грузинского. Возникновение и жизнь Кахети и Эрети. Ч.1.

Preceded by Grigol	Prince of Kakheti; 827–839	Succeeded by Samuel
