= Dou Yizhi =

Dou Yizhi (竇易直) (died April 29, 833), courtesy name Zongxuan (宗玄), formally Duke Gonghui of Jinyang (晉陽恭惠公), was an official of the Chinese Tang dynasty, serving as a chancellor during the reigns of Emperor Jingzong and Emperor Wenzong.

== Background ==
It is not known when Dou Yizhi was born, but it is known that his family was from the Tang capital municipality Jingzhao (京兆, in modern Xi'an, Shaanxi). His family claimed ancestry from the Han dynasty official Dou Wu (father to Empress Dou Miao). His grandfather Dou Yuanchang (竇元昌) served as a county magistrate, while his father Dou Yu (竇彧) served as a prefectural prefect.

Dou Yizhi passed the imperial examination in the Mingjing (明經) class, and was made a copywriter (校書郎, Xiaoshu Lang) at the Palace Library. He later passed a special imperial examination in judging cases, and was made the sheriff of Lantian County (藍田, in modern Xi'an). He later successively served as Yousi Langzhong (右司郎中), a supervisorial official in the administration of the executive bureau (尚書省, Shangshu Sheng); Bingbu Langzhong (兵部郎中), a supervisorial official at the ministry of defense (兵部, Bingbu); and Libu Langzhong (吏部郎中), a supervisorial official at the ministry of civil service affairs (吏部, Libu).

== During Emperor Xianzong's reign ==
In 811, Dou Yizhi was made the deputy chief imperial censor (御史中丞, Yushi Zhongcheng). In 813, he was made an imperial attendant (給事中, Jishizhong), and then made the governor (觀察使, Guanchashi) of Shanguo Circuit (陝虢, headquartered in modern Sanmenxia, Henan). At a later point, he was made the mayor of Jingzhao. While he was serving at Jingzhao, there was an incident where Han Wu (韓晤), the sheriff of Wannian County (萬年), one of the two counties making up the capital proper Chang'an, was found to have engaged in corruption. Dou ordered his subordinate Wei Zhengwu (韋正晤) to investigate, and Wei found that Han had embezzled 300,000 coins-worth of money. Then-reigning Emperor Xianzong, however, did not believe that investigations were sufficiently thorough and ordered a reinvestigation; the reinvestigation concluded that Han actually embezzled 10 times the amount Wei reported. As a result, in 817, Dou was demoted to be the prefect of Jin Prefecture (金州, in modern Ankang, Shaanxi), while Wei was exiled. In 818, Dou was made the governor of Xuanshe Circuit (宣歙, headquartered in modern Xuancheng, Anhui), as well as the prefect of its capital Xuan Prefecture (宣州).

== During Emperor Muzong's reign ==
In 822, by which time Emperor Xianzong's son Emperor Muzong was emperor, there was a mutiny at Xuanwu Circuit (宣武, headquartered in modern Kaifeng, Henan) in which the soldiers expelled their military governor (jiedushi) Li Yuan (李愿). Dou Yizhi heard about the mutiny and was concerned that his soldiers may be tempted to do the same. He considered passing out money and silk as rewards to them to endear them to him, but there was advice that doing so, without any reason, may in fact cause soldiers to fear that they were being suspected. He therefore did not do so, but rumors that he was passing out rewards already spread among the soldiers. One of the officers, Wang Guoqing (王國清) thus plotted a mutiny. Wang's plot was discovered, and Dou executed Wang and over 200 of his coconspirators. He was thereafter replaced by Li Deyu and recalled to Chang'an to serve as the deputy minister of civil service affairs (吏部侍郎, Libu Shilang). Later that year, he was made the deputy minister of census (戶部侍郎, Hubu Shilang) and the acting director of finances.

== During Emperor Jingzong's reign ==
Shortly after the death of Emperor Muzong and the ascension of Emperor Muzong's son Emperor Jingzong in 824, Dou Yizhi was made chancellor with the designation Tong Zhongshu Menxia Pingzhangshi (同中書門下平章事), along with Li Cheng, apparently at the recommendation of the chancellor Li Fengji. He was thereafter made Menxia Shilang (門下侍郎), the deputy head of the examination bureau of government (門下省, Menxia Sheng) while remaining as chancellor. He was also created the Duke of Jinyang, while being relieved of his post as director of finances. He was known for avoiding any appearances of nepotism, although years later, Emperor Jingzong's brother and successor Emperor Wenzong would comment, while speaking with the chancellors at that time:

When you recommend people, do not consider how close you are to them. I heard that when Dou Yizhi was chancellor, he did not once give a commission to anyone that he knew. If his acquaintances were talented but he abandoned them because he knew them, then this could not be said to be fair, either.

== During Emperor Wenzong's reign ==
In 828, by which time Wenzong was emperor (after Emperor Jingzong was assassinated around the new year 827), Dou Yizhi was relieved of his chancellor post and made the military governor of Shannan East Circuit (山南東道, headquartered in modern Xiangfan, Hubei) as well as the prefect of its capital Xiang Prefecture (襄州), although he retained the Tong Zhongshu Menxia Pingzhangshi title as an honorary title. In 831, he was recalled to Chang'an to serve as Zuo Pushe (左僕射), one of the heads of the executive bureau (尚書省, Shangshu Sheng), as well as acting minister of worship (太常卿, Taichang Qing). Later that year, he was made the military governor of Fengxiang Circuit (鳳翔, headquartered in modern Baoji, Shaanxi) as well as the mayor of its capital Fengxiang Municipality, and given the honorary title of acting Sikong (司空, one of the Three Excellencies). In 832, he requested a recall to Chang'an due to illness, and was recalled. He died in 833 and was given posthumous honors.

== Notes and references ==
- Old Book of Tang, vol. 167.
- New Book of Tang, vol. 151.
- Zizhi Tongjian, vols. 242, 243.
