= Mo Xuanqing =

Chinese poet and writer

Mo Xuanqing (Chinese: 莫宣卿; pinyin: Mò Xuānqīng, 17 August 834 – ?) was a Chinese novelist and poet. He was born in Zhaoqing, modern-day Guangdong, and was the youngest Zhuangyuan of the imperial examinations during the Tang dynasty. He became known for his literary talent at the age of 12. In 851, at the age of 17, he became the youngest Zhuangyuan since the Sui dynasty and the first Zhuangyuan in Lingnan.

== Poetry ==
Mo Xuanqing composed more than 200 poems and songs. However, most of his poems were lost and there are not more than 20 pieces remaining, surviving through large poetry collections such as the Quan Tang Shi and the Cantonese Poetry Collection (粵詩蒐逸).
