= Field of Lies =

833 encounter between Louis the Pious and his sons

The Field of Lies or Lügenfeld (833) was the name for an encounter that took place between Louis the Pious, the Carolingian Emperor, and his rebellious sons. When his sons and their forces met up near Colmar in Alsace, Louis the Pious' sworn supporters infamously deserted him to join his sons.

== Background ==
Louis the Pious, Holy Roman Emperor, inherited a vast empire from his father Charlemagne in 814. This vast territory included all of western Europe excluding the British Isles, the small Christian northern Spanish states, Muslim Spain and Byzantine southern Italy and Sicily. It is often suggested that Louis the Pious’ reign marks the beginning of a period of decline of what had been his father Charlemagne’s powerful empire, leading to the eventual decline of the Carolingians.

Louis’ role as Emperor carried with it the ecclesiastical basis for universal power: the concept that one of the Emperors duties was to protect the Church against dangers which might threaten its ability to correctly teach and spread the faith. The title of Holy Roman Emperor brought new ideas of inheritance. Possessing a universal authority to preserve the Church meant preserving the unity of the empire. In the past, Merovingian and Carolingian predecessors like Charlemagne treated kingdoms as private estates and, at death, the territory was divided among the sons. The early Carolingian idea of dividing up the territories of the kingdom among sons began to change. The reasoning behind passing along a kingdom undivided was casually linked to the Carolingian dynasty and its affiliation to the Catholic Church, establishing the notion of a Christian empire. Following this reasoning, for Louis to divide up the empire among his sons was to commit a mortal sin; he would be breaking up a true Christian empire that protected Catholic faith. The unity of the empire had to be maintained, thus, in a special ceremony, Louis prayed to God for inspiration to decide which son should be the inheritor. The eldest of the three, Lothar, was selected and was then associated with imperial authority, crowned co-emperor and ordered to look after and rule over his younger brothers, Pepin and Louis. These actions were to have serious consequences for both the succession to the throne and the integrity of the Frankish realm.

After the death of his first wife, Louis married Judith, who bore him another son, Charles, in 823. The accommodations required when a new heir was born brought on a crisis in the family. This included dissatisfied nobles and greedy bishops persuading Louis the Pious’ sons that, in reality, their father wished to destroy their inheritance. Louis the Pious’ attempt to make Charles co-heir to the Frankish kingdom caused agitation among his sons.

== Main Players ==
=== Lothar (795-855) ===
Lothar was Louis the Pious' first-born son and heir to his empire. He led his two younger brothers in a revolt against their father in 833, and fought a war against his brother Louis II and their half-brother, Charles.

=== Pepin (797-838) ===
Pepin was Louis the Pious' second son; he received the territory of Aquitaine in his father’s kingdom. He participated in a rebellion with his brothers against their father.

=== Louis II (806-876) ===
He was the third son of Louis the Pious. He received the territory of Germania also known as East Francia. He also received the title King of Bavaria from his grandfather Charlemagne upon his death.

=== Charles II (823-877) ===
Charles was Louis the Pious's youngest son, born to his second wife. He received title of Holy Roman Emperor in 875.

=== Pope Gregory IV (795-844) ===
Pope Gregory IV became Bishop of Rome in 827 and had previously held the title of Cardinal Priest of Basilica of St Mark. His papacy is notable due to his involvement in the disagreements between Louis the Pious and his sons.

== Event ==
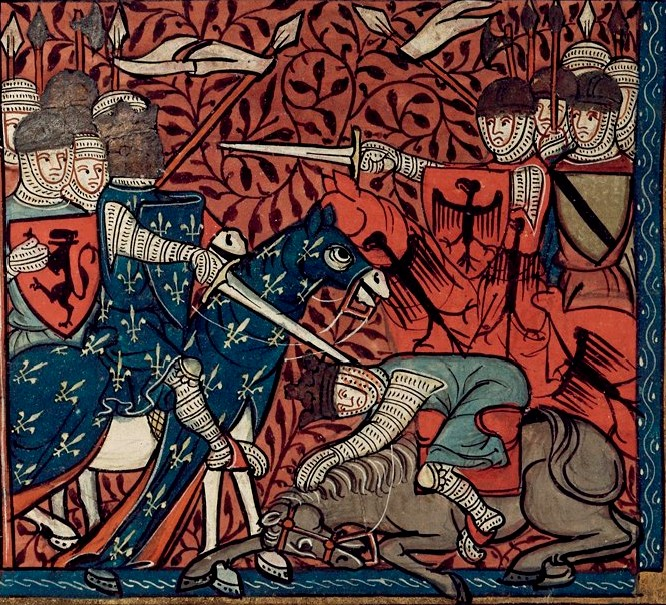
An illustration of Louis the Pious in battle.

"Evil communications corrupt good manners."

The division of the realm between Lothar and Charles stirred up Frankish aristocrats. The various dissatisfied nobles and clans of the Frankish realm caused Lothar, Pepin and Louis to form a common league against their father and to muster a large army of supporters. The brothers called upon Pope Gregory IV hoping that he of all people could help reconcile father to sons. Rumors began to circulate that if there was any disobedience to the Pope’s will or that of Louis the Pious’ sons, the Pope would excommunicate Louis the Pious and his bishops.

An assembly was held in Alsace in 833. This assembly included the convergence of Louis the Pious, his three elder sons, their respective forces and Pope Gregory (with his entourage). This event was to be known as the Field of Lies, because those who had sworn fealty to the emperor betrayed him to join his sons. It was here that Louis had to confront his sons and their moral pretext of defending the realm.

As Louis stood in battle formation he received Pope Gregory. The Pope reported hearing that Louis was having an ongoing struggle between his sons and that Gregory was there to help them all to gain peace. Louis stated his position and Pope Gregory returned to the Emperor's sons, but his efforts to attain a mutual peace was in vain. Due to bribes, threats or seduction by promises, Louis’ sworn supporters were surging to the side of his sons and joining their followers. The defection grew in momentum as the days passed and Lothar, Pepin and Louis were threatening to launch an attack on their father. Louis found himself in a position where, if an armed conflict were to take place, he would be overwhelmed by his sons' forces.

The Emperor agreed to meet his sons on the field. There, Louis told them to remember the promises they had made to him and his son (Charles) then proceeded to their camp. They told their father to abandon his camp and join them at theirs, which he did. At the camp of Lothar, Pepin and Louis, Louis the Pious was held in a pavilion designed for the specific purpose of keeping him at the camp.

== Aftermath ==
After these events, the empire was partitioned among the brothers in a threefold division. Pope Gregory departed for Italy, Pepin returned to Aquitaine, and Louis returned to Bavaria. Charles was banished to Italy and his mother was sent to a convent. Lothar took their father Louis with him as he continued on with his many duties. As Lothar traveled across his territory, he kept his father under constant watch. He also received an embassy from the Byzantine Emperor at Constantinople. He accepted the gifts and withheld the gifts designated for his father. He sent the gifts home along with the news of the tragedy, and fall from grace of Louis the Pious.

Louis the Pious then performed a public display of penance for his crimes against the empire and God. After the imprisoned Emperor performed his penance, his son Louis was compelled to make peace with him for the unity of the empire. After another shift of loyalties, Lothar fled to Burgundy and Louis the Pious was restored to power in 834.
