= Fridugisus =

Abbot in St. Martins, Tours

Fridugisus, also known as Fredegisus or Fredegis of Tours (born in England towards the end of the 8th century; died in Tours around 834), was a monk, teacher, and writer.

== Biography ==
An Anglo-Saxon, he was a pupil of Alcuin, first at York and afterwards at the court of Charlemagne in Aachen. The approximate date of his birth is determined by a reference to him as "a boy" (puer) in a letter of Alcuin dated 798. He was a favourite pupil of Alcuin and was one of the group of distinguished scholars who formed the Schola palatina in Aachen, in which he was known by the name Nathaniel. At that time he was a deacon.

When, in 796, Alcuin became abbot of Marmoutier Abbey, Tours, Fridugisus seems to have remained at the court.

According to some authorities he was Alcuin's successor as Master of the Palace School. This is, however, improbable. In 804 he succeeded his teacher as abbot of Marmoutier Abbey at Tours, retaining at the same time his relations with the emperor.

Among his contemporaries he enjoyed a reputation for great learning. He took part in controversies against Agobard de Lyon.

== Works ==
He composed several poems. He also wrote a short treatise in epistolary form, which deals with the nature of nothing and darkness, De nihilo et tenebris. The epistle was written probably during the author's residence at Tours. It is addressed "to all the faithful and to those who dwell in the sacred Palace of the most serene prince Charles". It dealt with the question, are nothing and darkness real things? (Some suggest that this was inspired by the Biblical use of the words in the first chapter of the Book of Genesis). If the Bible uses the words "nothing" and "darkness", it seemed that there must be things corresponding to those words. Fridugisus accepts this answer and defends it both by arguments from authority and by arguments from reason. That his solution, however, was not generally accepted is clear from the opening words of the treatise, in which he refers to the long prevailing divergence of opinion in the matter. The treatise makes use of the dialectical method which was afterwards developed into the scholastic method by Abelard, Alexander of Hales, and Saint Thomas Aquinas.
