= Sadyrnfyw =

Welsh bishop

Sadyrnfyw or Sadwrnfen the Generous (Welsh: Sadyrnfyw Hael; Welsh Latin: Suturnius; died c. 831) was a bishop of Meneva (modern St. David's) in medieval Wales.

His death is mentioned in the undated sections of the Annals of Wales. Phillimore's reconstruction of the dating places the entry in AD 831. The Chronicle of the Princes places it in 830.
