= Luo Yin =

Luo Yin (羅隱)
- Born: c. 833; Xincheng, Hang Prefecture, Tang
- Died: c. 910 (aged 76–77); Hang Prefecture, Wuyue
- Father: Luo Xiugu (羅修古)

Luo Yin
- Traditional Chinese: 羅隱
- Simplified Chinese: 罗隐
Transcriptions
Standard Mandarin
- Hanyu Pinyin: Luó Yǐn
- Wade–Giles: Lo^{2} Yin^{3}

Luo Heng
- Traditional Chinese: 羅橫
- Simplified Chinese: 罗横
Transcriptions
Standard Mandarin
- Hanyu Pinyin: Luó Héng

Luo Zhaojian
- Traditional Chinese: 羅昭諫
- Simplified Chinese: 罗昭谏
Transcriptions
Standard Mandarin
- Hanyu Pinyin: Luó Zhāojiàn

Jiangdongsheng
- Traditional Chinese: 江東生
- Simplified Chinese: 江东生
- Literal meaning: Scholar East of the River
Transcriptions
Standard Mandarin
- Hanyu Pinyin: Jiāngdōngshēng

Luo Yin (c. 833 – 910, courtesy name Zhaojian), born Luo Heng, was a poet of the late Tang and early Wuyue dynasties. Luo's poetry was widely read and cherished, but he was unsuccessful in life; having failed the imperial examination 10 times, he was penniless until the warlord and Wuyue founder Qian Liu gave him official posts in his hometown Hang Prefecture. Luo was said to be very ugly and arrogant.

== Life ==
Luo was born in Fuyang, Zhejiang. At the age of 20, he took his first Imperial examination. He failed the exam ten times. As a result, he gave himself the pseudonym "Yin" (lit. "dormant").

He was said to be of ugly countenance, and that he thought highly of himself and looked down on others. A famous anecdote demonstrates his ugliness: grand councilor Zheng Tian had a young daughter who enjoyed literature, and Luo Yin's poems which she frequently read out loud were her favorite readings. Zheng Tian became worried about her infatuation. One day, he invited Luo to his residence, and his daughter took a peek at the guest from behind the curtains. From that day on she never read his poems again.

In 870, he was given a post in Hunan. However, he was unable to take advantage of the post, and returned to Zhejiang in 887. Penniless and frustrated, he later became an assistant to Qian Liu, but never shed his arrogant ways. He died at the age of 77.

== Works ==
Luo Yin is best known for his plain spoken poetry and satiric wit. His most famous poem was called "Self Consolation" (自遣):

- 得(dé)即(jí)高(gāo)歌(gē)失(shī)即(jí)休(xiū)，多(duō)愁(chóu)多(duō)恨(hèn)亦(yì)悠(yōu)悠(yōu)。今(jīn)朝(zhāo)有(yǒu)酒(jiǔ)今(jīn)朝(zhāo)醉(zuì)，明(míng)日(rì)愁(chóu)來(lái)明(míng)日(rì)愁(chóu)。
  A gain makes me sing; a loss makes me sullen. Worries and regrets are always around. If there is wine today, then today is the day to get drunk. Worry about tomorrow's worries when they come tomorrow.
