= Robert, Count of Blois =

Robert (before 885-after November 902) was Count of Blois at the end of the 9th and the beginning of the 10th century. The only other thing know about him is that he countersigned a charter in November 902, in which Warnegaud, Vicomte de Blois and his wife Helena donated property.
