= 820s =

Decade

The 820s decade ran from January 1, 820, to December 31, 829.

== Events ==
=== 820 ===
==== By place ====
====== Abbasid Caliphate ======
- Abbasid caliph Al-Ma'mun appointed Isa ibn Yazid al-Juludi as Abbasid governor of Yemen for few months.
- Caliph Al-Ma'mun appointed Hisn ibn al-Minhal as Abbasid governor of Yemen for few months.
- Caliph Al-Ma'mun appointed Ibrahim al-Ifriqi as Abbasid governor of Yemen. He remained in office until 821.
- Caliph al-Ma'mun appointed Abu Nasr ibn al-Sari as Abbasid governor of Egypt.

====== Byzantine Empire ======
- December 25 – Emperor Leo V (the Armenian) is assassinated by conspirators in the Hagia Sophia, at Constantinople. Though unarmed, he fights back fiercely but dies of his wounds. He is succeeded by Michael II, the commander of the palace guard (excubitores). Leo's family (including his mother and his wife Theodosia) are exiled to monasteries in Princes' Islands.

====== Ireland ======
- Fedelmid mac Crimthainn assumes the kingship as ruler of Munster (modern Ireland).

====== China ======
- Emperor Xian Zong dies from poisoning (due to medicines), after a 14-year reign. He is succeeded by his son Mu Zong, as ruler of the Tang dynasty.

=== 821 ===
==== By place ====
====== Byzantine Empire ======
- Byzantine general Thomas the Slav leads a revolt, and secures control over most of the Byzantine themes (provinces) in Anatolia. He gets recognition from the Abbasid Caliphate, and concludes a peace treaty with Caliph al-Ma'mun. Thomas crosses with his fleet from Abydos to Thrace, and blockades Emperor Michael II in Constantinople; but Thomas' first attack on the capital fails.

====== Europe ======
- February – Duke Borna of Croatia dies after an 11-year reign, as vassal of the Frankish Empire. He is succeeded by his nephew, Vladislav. Emperor Louis I recognizes him as prince of Dalmatia and Liburnia, at the Council of Aachen.
- October – Lothair I, co-emperor and eldest son of Louis I, marries Ermengarde in Thionville (northeastern France). She is the daughter of Count Hugh of Tours.

====== Britain ======
- King Coenwulf of Mercia dies in Basingwerk near Holywell (Wales), while preparing for another assault on Powys, and is buried in Winchcombe Abbey. He is briefly succeeded by his son Cynehelm, but he is killed, probably fighting the Welsh, though supposedly through the treachery of his sister Cwenthryth. The Mercian throne passes to Coenwulf's brother, Ceolwulf I.

====== Abbasid Caliphate ======
- By the time Al-Ma'mun became caliph, the Arabs and the Byzantines had settled down into border skirmishing, with Arab raids deep into Anatolia to capture booty.
- Tahir ibn Husayn, an Iranian general, is appointed as governor of Khurasan, as a reward for supporting the Abbasid caliph al-Ma'mun in the Fourth Fitna.
- Caliph Al-Ma'mun appointed Nu'aym ibn al-Waddah al-Azdi as the governor of Yemen in 821.

=== 822 ===
==== By place ====
====== Byzantine Empire ======
- Byzantine general and usurper Thomas the Slav continues his revolt against Emperor Michael II. He unsuccessfully besieges Constantinople, while his fleet is destroyed by Michael's fleet, using Greek fire.
- Battle of Kedouktos (near Heraclea): Khan Omurtag of Bulgaria sends a relief army, and defeats the Byzantine rebels.

====== Europe ======
- Emperor Louis I performs public penance for causing his nephew Bernard's death 4 years earlier, at his palace of Attigny (Ardennes), before Pope Paschal I, and the Frankish nobles (this to restore harmony and re-establish his authority).
- The earliest known mention of the Serbs, in Einhard's Royal Frankish Annals.

====== Britain ======
- King Ceolwulf I of Mercia invades Powys (Wales), but is beaten back by King Cyngen. However, Ceolwulf does destroy the fortress of Deganwy, and later takes the kingdom under his control (approximate date).

====== Al-Andalus ======
- Al-Hakam I, Umayyad emir of Córdoba, dies after a 26-year reign. He is succeeded by his son Abd al-Rahman II, who begins a military campaign against King Alfonso II of Asturias in Al-Andalus (modern Spain).

====== Asia ======
- Kim Hŏn-ch'ang launches a short-lived rebellion in Silla, which gains control over much of the southern and western Korean Peninsula.

====== Central America ======
- February 6 – Ukit Took becomes the last ruler (ajaw) of the Mayan city-state Copán (modern Guatemala). After his death in 830, the kingdom is wiped out, most likely from an epidemic.

==== By topic ====
====== Religion ======
- Rabanus Maurus, a Frankish Benedictine monk, becomes abbot of Fulda, after the death of Eigil.

=== 823 ===
==== By place ====
====== Byzantine Empire ======
- Emperor Michael II defeats the rebel forces under Thomas the Slav in Thrace. He and his supporters are forced to seek refuge in Arkadiopolis (modern Turkey). After five months of blockade, Thomas surrenders and is delivered to Michael, seated on a donkey and bound in chains. He pleads for clemency and prostrates before Michael, but is executed.

====== Europe ======
- April 5 – Lothair I, eldest son of Emperor Louis I, is crowned co-emperor again by Pope Paschal I at Rome (initiating the papal practice of handing the imperial sword over, as a symbol of temporal power in the Holy Roman Empire).

====== Britain ======
- King Ceolwulf I of Mercia is deposed by Beornwulf, who takes the throne of Mercia. During his rule he rebuilds the Abbey of St. Peter, and presides over two synods at Clofesho.

====== Japan ======
- May 30 – Emperor Saga abdicates the throne, after a 10-year reign. He is succeeded by his brother Junna, as the 53rd emperor of Japan.

=== 824 ===
==== By date ====
- February 8 – The Tenchō era begins in Japan at the beginning of the reign of the Emperor Junna, bringing an end to the Kōnin era after 15 years.
- February 11 – Pope Paschal I, leader of the Roman Catholic Church and ruler of the Papal States,dies after a reign of seven years. The Roman Curia refuses to bury him in St. Peter's Basilica because of his harsh treatment of the people of Rome, and inters him instead in the Basilica of Santa Prassede. The office remains vacant for four months before a new conclave is assembled.
- February 29 – Prince Li Zhan, 14 years old, is enthroned as the Emperor Jingzong of China, four days after the death of his father, Emperor Muzong.
- February – A major earthquake strikes Byzantium in Asia Minor (now part of western Turkey) and part of Greece, damaging the city walls of Theodosiopolis (now Barbaros in Turkey) and Heraclea Perinthus at the same time that the forces of Byzantine Emperor Michael II the Amorian are suppressing the rebellion by Thomas the Slav. Both cities surrender after the natural event.
- March 3 &ndash (9.19.13.15.19) (9th B'ak'tun, 19th K'atun, 13th year (Tun) 15th month (Winal) 19th day (K'in)) Juun Tsak-Took becomes the new ruler of the Mayan city state of Machaquila (in what is now Guatemala), along with co-ruler and Ti-Chaak become the after the death of Sihyaj K'in Ich’aak II. Juun Tsak-Tookwill until his 840.
- March 5 – Adelard becomes the new Duke of Spoleto upon the death of his father, Suppo I, who ruled much of Italy including Brescia, Parma, Piacenza, Modena, and Bergamo. Adelard reigns for only five months before dying in August.
- May – In Constantinople and throughout the Byzantine Empire, Michael II celebrates the festival of Triumph to mark his return to the capital after defeating the rebellion of Thomas the Slav
- June 4 – Pope Eugene II is selected by church leaders and the local nobility of the Papal States as the 99th Pontiff of the Roman Catholic Church, succeeding Pope Paschal I, receiving a majority after the more conservative Zinzinnus is rejected.
- September – Rebellious Arab troops in North Africa, led by Mansur ibn Nasr al-Tunbudhi in a battle against the Aghlabids, led by the Emir Ziyadat Allah, invade and occupy the city of Tunis.
- November 11 – The Constitutio Romana, drawn up between King Lothair I of Italy, Louis the Pious, since 817, and Pope Eugene II, establishes the authority of the Holy Roman Emperors over the papacy of Rome.

==== By place ====
====== Europe ======
- Battle of Roncevaux Pass: The Basques and Banu Qasi defeat a Frankish expedition, led by Counts Aznar and Ebles, in the Pyrenees.
- Iñigo Arista revolts against the Frankish Empire, and establishes the Kingdom of Pamplona, with the support of the Caliphate of Córdoba.
- Vikings raid Ireland, on the Kingdom of Munster at Skellig Michael

====== Britain ======
- Vikings raid Bangor (modern Wales) for the second time, and plunder the bishopric (approximate date).

====== Japan ======
- Zenpuku-ji, one of the oldest Tokyo temples, is founded by the Japanese Buddhist monk Kūkai.

==== By topic ====
====== Religion ======
- February 11 – Pope Paschal I dies after a 7-year reign, and is succeeded by Eugene II, as the 99th pope of the Catholic Church.

=== 825 ===
==== By place ====
====== India ======
- A group of Persio-Assyrian adherents of the Church of the East, under the leadership of two Persian bishops Prod (or Proth, also known as Aphroth) and Sappor (also known as Sabrisho), reach Kerala, India and reside in Quilon.
- August - This year, on the first day of Chingam month, Kerala’s Kollam Era ( Malayalam Era/Calendar, also known as Kollavarsham) commenced.

====== Europe ======
- Emperor Louis the Pious begins a military campaign against the Wends and Sorbs. Duke Tunglo surrenders his son as hostage, and submits to Frankish rule (approximate date).
- Grímur Kamban becomes the first man to set foot in the Faroe Islands, and settles down in Funningur, on the northwest coast of Eysturoy (beginning the Norwegian Viking era on the islands).
- Murcia is founded by the emir of Cordoba Abd ar-Rahman II.

====== Britain ======
- Battle of Ellandun: King Egbert of Wessex defeats Beornwulf of Mercia near Swindon. The battle marks the end of the Mercian domination of southern England. The kingdoms of Kent, Surrey, Sussex and Essex submit to Wessex, and East Anglia acknowledges Egbert as overlord (bretwalda).
- King Hywel ap Rhodri of Gwynedd dies after an 11-year reign. The kingdom is seized by his grand-nephew, Merfyn Frych of Man.
- Battle of Gafulford: The men of Cornish Dumnonia clash with the West Saxons at modern-day Camelford (approximate date).

==== By topic ====
====== Religion ======
- Borobudur, a Mahayana Buddhist Temple, is completed in Central Java (modern Indonesia).

=== 826 ===
==== By place ====
====== Britain ======
- King Beornwulf of Mercia invades East Anglia, but is killed in battle. He is succeeded by Ludeca, as ruler of Mercia.
- Prince Aethelwulf, a son of King Egbert of Wessex, invades Kent, and drives out its pro-Mercian king Baldred.

====== Byzantine Empire ======
- May – Euphemius, Byzantine admiral, organises an uprising in Sicily against Emperor Michael II. He proclaims himself Emperor (with the title of basileus) in Syracuse, independent from Constantinople. In turn, Euphemius is defeated by Byzantine troops (reinforcements from the East), and is driven out to North Africa.

====== Europe ======
- King Harald Klak of Denmark receives the Frisian county of Rüstringen, as a gift from Emperor Louis the Pious.

==== By topic ====
====== Religion ======
- Harald Klak accepts Christianity, and is baptized with his wife and son Godfrid at Mainz.

=== 827 ===
==== By place ====
====== Byzantine Empire ======
- June 14 – Euphemius, exiled Byzantine admiral, asks for the help of North African Arabs, to retake Sicily and Malta from the Byzantines. Emir Ziyadat Allah I of Ifriqiya promises to return the islands to Euphemius, in exchange for a yearly tribute, and sends an Arab Muslim expeditionary force of 10,000 men under the 70-year-old Asad ibn al-Furat, which lands at Mazara del Vallo in Sicily.
- Fall – Siege of Syracuse: Muslim forces under Asad ibn al-Furat, in support of the rebel Byzantine army, besiege Syracuse, Sicily.

====== Europe ======
- Summer – Omurtag, ruler (khan) of the Bulgarian Empire, launches an attack to the West, and penetrates into Pannonia. He expels the local chiefs, and installs Bulgar governors over the Slavic tribes to control them. Omurtag conquers the cities of Beograd, Braničevo, Sirmium, and most of eastern Slavonia.
- Giustiniano Participazio deposes his younger brother Giovanni I, and is appointed doge of Venice. Giovanni, who is part of a pro-Frankish faction, is exiled to Zara (modern Croatia).

====== Britain ======
- Æthelstan establishes himself as king of East Anglia, after killing King Ludeca of Mercia in battle. Ludeca is succeeded by Wiglaf, father-in-law (and probably distant cousin) of the late king Ceolwulf I's daughter.

====== China ======
- Emperor Jing Zong is assassinated by a group of conspirators. He is succeeded by his brother Wen Zong, as ruler of the Tang Dynasty.

==== By topic ====
====== Religion ======
- August 27 – Pope Eugene II dies after a 3-year reign, and is succeeded by Valentine as the 100th pope of the Catholic Church.
- October 10 – Pope Valentine dies just after a two-month reign, and is succeeded by Gregory IV as the 101st pope of Rome.

====== Science ======
- Khalid ibn Abd al-Malik al-Marwarrudhi and Ali ibn Isa al-Asturlabi travel to the Plain of Sinjar (modern Iraq), under orders of Caliph Al-Ma'mun, to measure the size of the Earth.

====== Agriculture ======
- The Saracens, who found spinach originally in Persia (modern Iran), introduce the plant to Sicily.

=== 828 ===
==== By place ====
====== Byzantine Empire ======
- Siege of Syracuse: The Muslims under Asad ibn al-Furat defeat a Byzantine relief army sent from Palermo, and backed by a Venetian fleet led by Giustiniano Participazio. Al-Furat decides to break off the siege at Syracuse, as his forces suffer greatly from lack of food. Later he dies during an outbreak of an epidemic.
- Summer – Euphemius, Byzantine admiral, is murdered by emissaries from the Byzantine garrison at Castrogiovanni, which is besieged by the Muslims. Threatened by Byzantine reinforcements arriving from Constantinople, the survivors burn their ships and retreat overland westward to Mazara del Vallo.

====== Europe ======
- Al-Andalus: The city of Merida (modern Spain) rises twice in one year against the Umayyad Emirate.
- Kydonia, on the northwest coast of Crete, is destroyed by Saracen pirates (approximate date).
- Alcamo in Sicily is founded by the Muslim commander al-Kamuk (approximate date).

====== China ======
- In the capital of Chang'an, a powerful court eunuch orders 50 wrestlers to arrest 300 commoners over a land property dispute in Northwest Chang'an, whereupon a riot breaks out in the streets.

====== North America ======
- The occupation of Pueblo Bonito begins.

==== By topic ====
====== Religion ======
- Relics of Mark the Evangelist are stolen from Alexandria (controlled by the Abbasid Caliphate) by two Venetian merchants, and brought to Venice.
- At the instigation of Adalram, archbishop of Salzburg, the first Christian church in Central and Eastern Europe is built in Nitra, Pannonia.
- A Coptic revolt breaks out in Egypt (approximate date).

=== 829 ===
==== By place ====
====== Byzantine Empire ======
- October 2 – Emperor Michael II dies after an 8-year reign in Constantinople, and is succeeded by his 16-year-old son Theophilos, as sole emperor of the Byzantine Empire. He continues his father's ideology of iconoclasm.
- October – Battle of Thasos: Saracens from the newly founded Emirate of Crete almost annihilate the Byzantine fleet at Thasos, close to the coast of Thrace. The Cyclades and other islands in the Aegean Sea are pillaged.

====== Europe ======
- Emperor Louis the Pious appoints his 6-year-old son Charles (by his second wife Judith) as ruler of the Frankish subkingdom Alamannia, enraging his eldest son and co-emperor Lothair I, who begins an insurrection.
- Viking chieftain Halfdan the Black becomes king of Agder (modern Norway). He expands his realm through military conquest and political negotiations, dividing the kingdom of Vestfold with his half-brother Olaf.
- Giustiniano Participazio, doge of Venice, dies after a 2-year reign, and is succeeded by his younger brother Giovanni Participazio. He continues the work of Giustiniano, in construction of St. Mark's Basilica.

====== Britain ======
- King Egbert of Wessex invades Mercia, ousts his rival Wiglaf, and attempts to rule directly from Wessex. He is recognized as overlord (bretwalda) of other English kingdoms.
- Winter – Battle of the River Dore: Egbert of Wessex leads his army against the Northumbrians as far as Dore, where he clashes with King Eanred of Northumbria.

====== Egypt ======
- The Nile River freezes over.

====== China ======
- The Bai kingdom of Nanzhao captures the city of Chengdu, in Sichuan Province.

==== By topic ====
====== Religion ======
- Ansgar, Frankish abbot of Corvey (modern Westphalia), is appointed missionary to Sweden by Louis the Pious, at the request of the Swedish king Björn at Haugi.
- The city of Wiesbaden (Germany) is first mentioned by Einhard, biographer of former emperor Charlemagne (approximate date).

== Significant people ==
- Louis the Pious
- Egbert of Wessex
- Michael II
- Thomas the Slav
- Omurtag of Bulgaria
- Al-Ma'mun

== Births ==
820

- Adalbert I, Frankish margrave (approximate date)
- Adelaide of Tours, Frankish noblewoman (approximate date)
- Álmos, military leader (gyula) of the Hungarians (approximate date)
- Anandavardhana, Indian philosopher (d. 890)
- Ashot I ("the Great"), king of Armenia (approximate date)
- Buhturi, Syrian poet (d. 897)
- Godfrid Haraldsson, Danish Viking king (approximate date)
- Grimbald, Frankish Benedictine monk (d. 901)
- Hucbert, Frankish nobleman (d. 864)
- Ibn Khordadbeh, Persian geographer (approximate date)
- Qusta ibn Luqa, Syrian Melkite physician (d. 912)
- Ranulf I of Aquitaine, Frankish nobleman (d. 866)
- Rhodri the Great, king of Gwynedd (Wales) (approximate date)

821

- Gao Pian, general of the Tang dynasty (d. 887)
- Gisela, Frankish princess, daughter of Louis the Pious
- Ibn Abi Asim, Muslim Sunni scholar (or 822)
- Ordoño I, king of Asturias (approximate date)

822

- Al-Mutawakkil, Muslim caliph (d. 861)
- Ibn Abi Asim, Muslim Sunni scholar (or 821)
- Minamoto no Tōru, Japanese poet (d. 895)
- Xuefeng Yicun, Chinese Chan master (d. 908)

823

- June 13 – Charles the Bald, king of the Franks (d. 877)
- Ermentrude of Orléans, queen of the Franks (d. 869)
- Muhammad I, Muslim emir of Córdoba (d. 886)
- Pepin II (the Younger), king of Aquitaine

824

- Al-Tirmidhi, Persian scholar and hadith compiler (d. 892)
- Chen Tao, Chinese poet (d. 882)
- Ibn Majah, Persian scholar and hadith compiler
- Li Pu, prince of the Tang dynasty (d. 828)
- Muhammad ibn Abdallah, Muslim governor (or 825)
- Zhao Chou, Chinese warlord (d. 889)

825

- Ariwara no Narihira, Japanese waka poet (d. 880)
- Charles, Frankish bishop and archchancellor (or 830)
- Fujiwara no Yasunori, Japanese nobleman (d. 895)
- Landulf II, bishop and count of Capua (approximate date)
- Louis II, king of Italy and Holy Roman Emperor (d. 875)
- Muhammad ibn Abdallah, Muslim governor (or 824)
- Ono no Komachi, Japanese poet (approximate date)
- Tsunesada, Japanese prince (d. 884)

826

- January 22 – Montuku, emperor of Japan (d. 858)
- November 29 – William of Septimania, Frankish nobleman (d. 850)
- Al-Mubarrad, Muslim grammarian (d. 898)
- Ansgarde of Burgundy, Frankish queen (approximate date)
- Cyril, Byzantine missionary and bishop (d. 885)
- Doseon, Korean Buddhist monk (d. 898)
- Thābit ibn Qurra, Muslim astronomer and physician (d. 901)

827

- Cyril, Byzantine missionary and bishop (d. 869)
- Ibn al-Rawandi, Muslim scholar and writer (d. 911)
- Maura of Troyes, Frankish noblewoman and saint (d. 850)

828

- Ali al-Hadi, 10th Shia Imam
- Al-Dinawari, astronomer and grammarian (d. 889)
- Carloman of Bavaria, Frankish king (or 830)
- Ibn Qutaybah, Muslim scholar (d. 889)
- Yantou Quanhuo, Chinese Chan master (d. 887)

829

- September 8 – Ali al-Hadi, 10th Shia Imam (approximate date)
- Al-Nasa'i, Muslim scholar and hadith compiler (approximate date)
- Lu Yan, chancellor of the Tang dynasty (d. 874)
- Yahya I, Muslim sultan (d. 864)

== Deaths ==
820

- September 14, Li Yong, chancellor of the Tang dynasty
- December 25, Leo V, emperor of the Byzantine Empire (b. 775)
- Adi Shankara, Indian philosopher and theologian (b. 788)
- Causantín mac Fergusa, king of the Picts
- Huangfu Bo, chancellor of the Tang dynasty
- Lupo III, duke of Gascony (approximate date)
- Muhammad ibn Idris al-Shafi‘i, Muslim imam (b. 767)
- Olcobhar mac Cummuscach, abbot of Clonfert
- Song Ruoxin, Chinese scholar and poet (b. 768)
- Tnúthgal mac Donngaile, king of Munster
- Tutu Chengcui, eunuch and advisor of the Tang dynasty
- Wang Chengzong, general of the Tang dynasty
- Xian Zong, emperor of the Tang dynasty (b. 778)

821

- April 7 – George the Standard-Bearer, archbishop of Mytilene (b. c. 776)
- May 2 – Liu Zong, general of the Tang dynasty
- December 18 – Theodulf, bishop of Orléans
- Arno, archbishop of Salzburg
- Artrí mac Cathail, king of Munster (Ireland)
- Benedict of Aniane, Frankish monk
- Borna, duke (knez) of Croatia
- Coenwulf, king of Mercia
- Egbert, bishop of Lindisfarne
- Guisclafred, Frankish nobleman (approximate date)
- Li Su, general of the Tang dynasty (b. 773)
- Tian Hongzheng, general of the Tang dynasty (b. 764)
- Wei Guanzhi, chancellor of the Tang dynasty (b. 760)
- Zheng Yuqing, chancellor of the Tang dynasty (b. 746)

822

- June 26 – Saichō, Japanese Buddhist monk (b. 767)
- Al-Hakam I, Muslim emir of Córdoba (b. 771)
- Al-Waqidi, Muslim historian and biographer
- Denebeorht, bishop of Worcester
- Eigil of Fulda, Bavarian abbot
- Gregory Pterotos, Byzantine general (strategos)
- Kim Hŏn-ch'ang, Silla aristocrat and rebel leader
- Li Yijian, chancellor of the Tang Dynasty (b. 756)
- Tahir ibn Husayn, founder of the Tahirid Dynasty
- Tian Bu, general of the Tang Dynasty (b. 785)
- Winiges, duke of Spoleto (Italy)

823

- Adelochus, archbishop of Strasbourg (b. 786)
- Boniface I, margrave of Tuscany
- Ceolwulf I, king of Mercia (approximate date)
- Gondulphus, bishop of Metz
- Han Hong, general of the Tang Dynasty b. 765)
- Ljudevit, duke of the Slavs in Lower Pannonia
- Thekla, Byzantine empress (approximate date)
- Thomas the Slav, Byzantine general and usurper
- Timothy I, Syrian patriarch
- Wulfheard, bishop of Hereford (approximate date)

824

- February 11 – Paschal I, pope of the Catholic Church
- March 5 – Suppo I, Frankish nobleman
- August 5 – Heizei, emperor of Japan (b. 773)
- Adelard, duke of Spoleto (Italy)
- Han Yu, Chinese philosopher and poet (b. 768)
- Mauring, Frankish nobleman
- Mu Zong, emperor of the Tang dynasty (b. 795)
- Óengus of Tallaght, Irish bishop
- Ruthmael, Irish abbot and bishop
- Sayyida Nafisa, Arab female scholar (b. 762)
- Wetti of Reichenau, German scholar
- Zhang Hongjing, Chinese chancellor (b. 760)

825

- Abu Ubaidah, Muslim scholar (b. 728)
- Hywel ap Rhodri, king of Gwynedd (Wales)
- Ida of Herzfeld, Frankish noblewoman (approximate date)
- Liu Wu, general of the Tang Dynasty
- Máel Bressail mac Ailillo, king of Ulaid (Ireland)
- Song Ruozhao, Chinese scholar, lady-in-waiting and poet (b. 770)
- Rampon, count of Barcelona
- Welf, father of Judith of Bavaria
- Wihomarc, Breton chieftain

826

- Ashot I, prince of Iberia (or 830)
- Ashot Msaker, prince of Armenia
- Bai Xingjian, Chinese poet and writer (b. 776)
- Beornwulf, king of Mercia
- Fujiwara no Fuyutsugu, Japanese general (b. 775)
- Heondeok, king of Silla (Korea)
- Li Guangyan, Chinese general (b. 761)
- Li Wu, prince of the Tang Dynasty
- Theodore the Studite, Byzantine abbot (b. 759)
- Wu Yantong, Chinese Buddhist monk
- Zhu Kerong, Chinese governor (jiedushi)

827

- January 1 – Adalard of Corbie, Frankish abbot
- August 27 – Eugene II, pope of the Catholic Church
- October 10 – Valentine, pope of the Catholic Church
- Agnello Participazio, doge of Venice
- Claudius, archbishop of Turin
- Grigol of Kakheti, Georgian prince
- Guillemundus, Frankish nobleman
- Hildegrim, bishop of Châlons
- Jing Zong, emperor of the Tang Dynasty (b. 809)
- Li Yi, Chinese poet (or 829)
- Ludeca, king of Mercia
- Wu Chongyin, Chinese general (b. 761)
- Yaoshan Weiyan, Chinese Buddhist monk (b. 745)

828

- Asad ibn al-Furat, Muslim jurist and theologian (b. 759)
- Euphemius, Byzantine admiral and usuper
- Ibn Hisham, Muslim historian (or 833)
- Idriss II, Muslim emir of Morocco (b. 791)
- Nikephoros I, patriarch of Constantinople
- Talha ibn Tahir, Muslim governor

829

- June 1 – Li Tongjie, general of the Tang dynasty
- July 30 – Shi Xiancheng, general of the Tang dynasty
- October 2 – Michael II, emperor of the Byzantine Empire (b. 770)
- Abu al-Razi Muhammad, Muslim governor
- Cináed mac Mugróin, king of Uí Failghe
- Cui Zhi, chancellor of the Tang dynasty (b. 772)
- Giustiniano Participazio, doge of Venice
- Leibulf of Provence, Frankish nobleman
- Li Yi, Chinese poet (or 827)
- Li You, general of the Tang dynasty
- Muiredach mac Ruadrach, king of Leinster
- 'Umayr ibn al-Walid, Muslim governor
- Wei Chuhou, chancellor of the Tang dynasty (b. 773)
- Zheng Yin, chancellor of the Tang dynasty (b. 752)
