= 827 =

Calendar year

827 in various calendars
Gregorian calendar	827; DCCCXXVII
Ab urbe condita	1580
Armenian calendar	276; ԹՎ ՄՀԶ
Assyrian calendar	5577
Balinese saka calendar	748–749
Bengali calendar	233–234
Berber calendar	1777
Buddhist calendar	1371
Burmese calendar	189
Byzantine calendar	6335–6336
Chinese calendar	丙午年 (Fire Horse); 3524 or 3317 — to — 丁未年 (Fire Goat); 3525 or 3318
Coptic calendar	543–544
Discordian calendar	1993
Ethiopian calendar	819–820
Hebrew calendar	4587–4588
- Hindu calendars
Vikram Samvat	883–884
Shaka Samvat	748–749
Kali Yuga	3927–3928
Holocene calendar	10827
Iranian calendar	205–206
Islamic calendar	211–212
Japanese calendar	Tenchō 4 (天長４年)
Javanese calendar	723–724
Julian calendar	827; DCCCXXVII
Korean calendar	3160
Minguo calendar	1085 before ROC 民前1085年
Nanakshahi calendar	−641
Seleucid era	1138/1139 AG
Thai solar calendar	1369–1370
Tibetan calendar	མེ་ཕོ་རྟ་ལོ་ (male Fire-Horse); 953 or 572 or −200 — to — མེ་མོ་ལུག་ལོ་ (female Fire-Sheep); 954 or 573 or −199

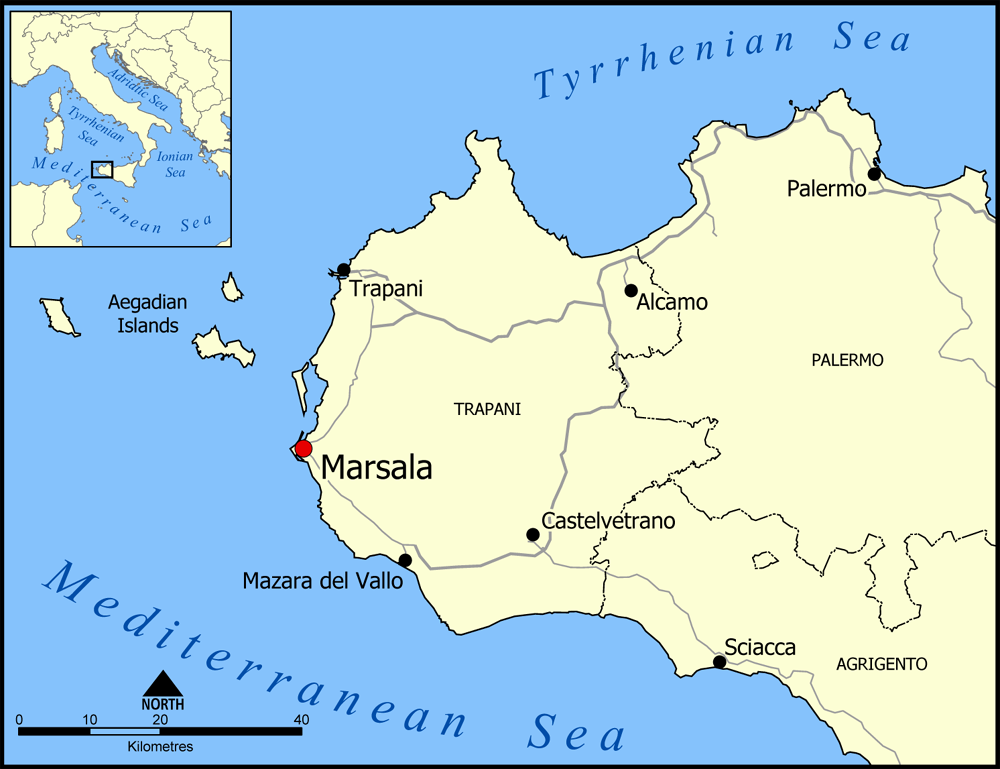
The Saracens begin the conquest of Sicily

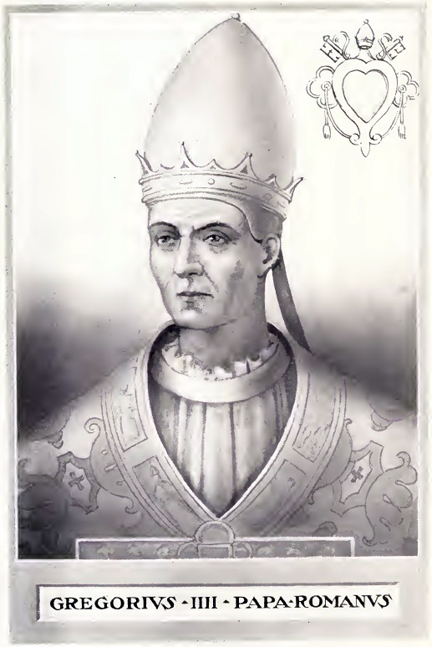
Pope Gregory IV (c. 795–844)

Year 827 (DCCCXXVII) was a common year starting on Tuesday of the Julian calendar.

== Events ==
=== By place ===
==== Byzantine Empire ====
- June 14 – Euphemius, exiled Byzantine admiral, asks for the help of North African Arabs, to retake Sicily and Malta from the Byzantines. Emir Ziyadat Allah I of Ifriqiya promises to return the islands to Euphemius, in exchange for a yearly tribute, and sends an Arab Muslim expeditionary force of 10,000 men under the 70-year-old Asad ibn al-Furat, which lands at Mazara del Vallo in Sicily.
- Fall – Siege of Syracuse: Muslim forces under Asad ibn al-Furat, in support of the rebel Byzantine army, besiege Syracuse, Sicily.

==== Europe ====
- Summer – Omurtag, ruler (khan) of the Bulgarian Empire, launches an attack to the West, and penetrates into Pannonia. He expels the local chiefs, and installs Bulgar governors over the Slavic tribes to control them. Omurtag conquers the cities of Beograd, Braničevo, Sirmium, and most of eastern Slavonia.
- Giustiniano Participazio deposes his younger brother Giovanni I, and is appointed doge of Venice. Giovanni, who is part of a pro-Frankish faction, is exiled to Zara (modern Croatia).

==== Britain ====
- Æthelstan establishes himself as king of East Anglia, after killing King Ludeca of Mercia in battle. Ludeca is succeeded by Wiglaf, father-in-law (and probably distant cousin) of the late king Ceolwulf I's daughter.

==== China ====
- Emperor Jing Zong is assassinated by a group of conspirators. He is succeeded by his brother Wen Zong, as ruler of the Tang Dynasty.

=== By topic ===
==== Religion ====
- August 27 – Pope Eugene II dies after a 3-year reign, and is succeeded by Valentine as the 100th pope of the Catholic Church.
- October 10 – Pope Valentine dies just after a two-month reign, and is succeeded by Gregory IV as the 101st pope of Rome.

==== Science ====
- Khalid ibn Abd al-Malik al-Marwarrudhi and Ali ibn Isa al-Asturlabi travel to the Plain of Sinjar (modern Iraq), under orders of Caliph Al-Ma'mun, to measure the size of the Earth.

==== Agriculture ====
- The Saracens, who found spinach originally in Persia (modern Iran), introduce the plant to Sicily.

== Births ==
- Cyril, Byzantine missionary and bishop (d. 869)
- Ibn al-Rawandi, Muslim scholar and writer (d. 911)
- Maura of Troyes, Frankish noblewoman and saint (d. 850)

== Deaths ==
- January 1 – Adalard of Corbie, Frankish abbot
- August 27 – Eugene II, pope of the Catholic Church
- October 10 – Valentine, pope of the Catholic Church
- Agnello Participazio, doge of Venice
- Claudius, archbishop of Turin
- Grigol of Kakheti, Georgian prince
- Guillemundus, Frankish nobleman
- Hildegrim, bishop of Châlons
- Jing Zong, emperor of the Tang Dynasty (b. 809)
- Li Yi, Chinese poet (or 829)
- Ludeca, king of Mercia
- Wu Chongyin, Chinese general (b. 761)
- Yaoshan Weiyan, Chinese Buddhist monk (b. 745)
