= 826 =

Calendar year

826 in various calendars
- Gregorian calendar: 826; DCCCXXVI
- Ab urbe condita: 1579
- Armenian calendar: 275; ԹՎ ՄՀԵ
- Assyrian calendar: 5576
- Balinese saka calendar: 747–748
- Bengali calendar: 232–233
- Berber calendar: 1776
- Buddhist calendar: 1370
- Burmese calendar: 188
- Byzantine calendar: 6334–6335
- Chinese calendar: 乙巳年 (Wood Snake); 3523 or 3316 — to — 丙午年 (Fire Horse); 3524 or 3317
- Coptic calendar: 542–543
- Discordian calendar: 1992
- Ethiopian calendar: 818–819
- Hebrew calendar: 4586–4587
- Hindu calendars
- Vikram Samvat: 882–883
- Shaka Samvat: 747–748
- Kali Yuga: 3926–3927
- Holocene calendar: 10826
- Iranian calendar: 204–205
- Islamic calendar: 210–211
- Japanese calendar: Tenchō 3 (天長３年)
- Javanese calendar: 722–723
- Julian calendar: 826; DCCCXXVI
- Korean calendar: 3159
- Minguo calendar: 1086 before ROC 民前1086年
- Nanakshahi calendar: −642
- Seleucid era: 1137/1138 AG
- Thai solar calendar: 1368–1369
- Tibetan calendar: ཤིང་མོ་སྦྲུལ་ལོ་ (female Wood-Snake); 952 or 571 or −201 — to — མེ་ཕོ་རྟ་ལོ་ (male Fire-Horse); 953 or 572 or −200

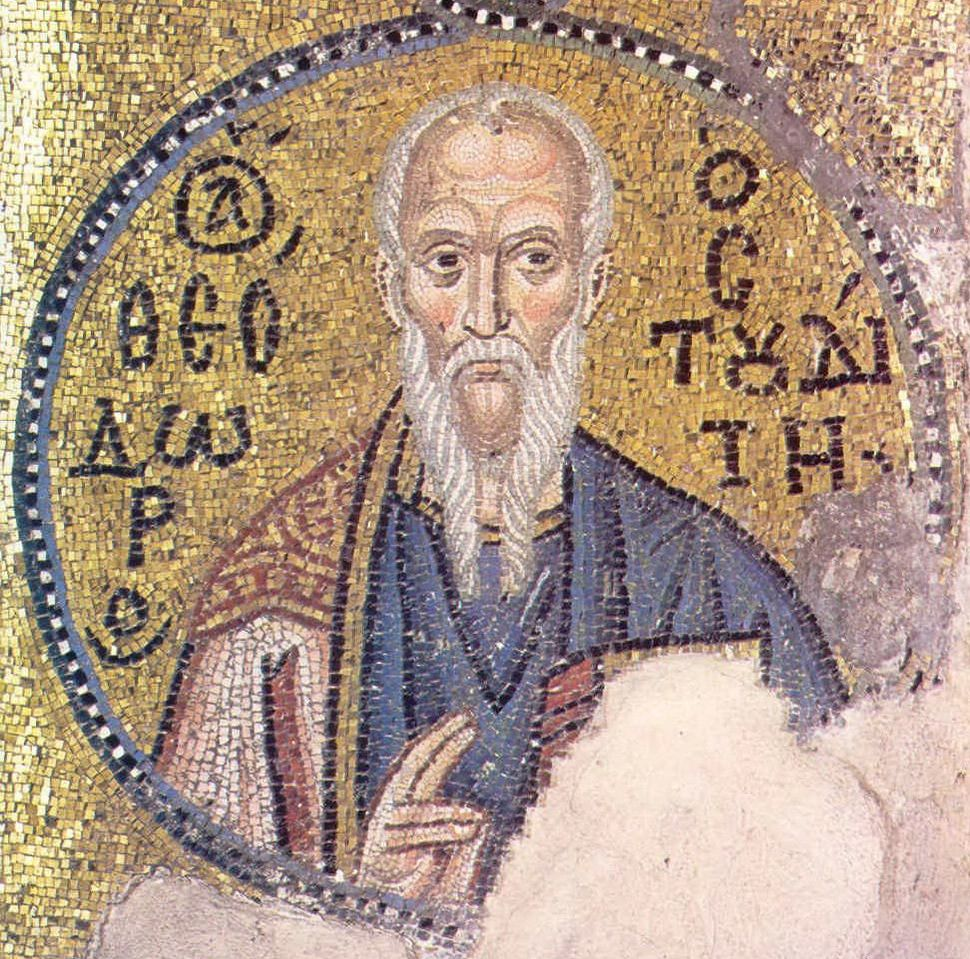
Theodore the Studite (759–826)

Year 826 (DCCCXXVI) was a common year starting on Monday of the Julian calendar, the 826th year of the Common Era (CE) and Anno Domini (AD) designations, the 826th year of the 1st millennium, the 26th year of the 9th century, and the 7th year of the 820s decade.

== Events ==
=== By place ===
==== Britain ====
- King Beornwulf of Mercia invades East Anglia, but is killed in battle. He is succeeded by Ludeca, as ruler of Mercia.
- Prince Aethelwulf, a son of King Egbert of Wessex, invades Kent, and drives out its pro-Mercian king Baldred.

==== Byzantine Empire ====
- May – Euphemius, Byzantine admiral, organises an uprising in Sicily against Emperor Michael II. He proclaims himself Emperor (with the title of basileus) in Syracuse, independent from Constantinople. In turn, Euphemius is defeated by Byzantine troops (reinforcements from the East), and is driven out to North Africa.

==== Europe ====
- King Harald Klak of Denmark receives the Frisian county of Rüstringen, as a gift from Emperor Louis the Pious.

=== By topic ===
==== Religion ====
- Harald Klak accepts Christianity, and is baptized with his wife and son Godfrid at Mainz.

== Births ==
- January 22 – Montuku, emperor of Japan (d. 858)
- November 29 – William of Septimania, Frankish nobleman (d. 850)
- Al-Mubarrad, Muslim grammarian (d. 898)
- Ansgarde of Burgundy, Frankish queen (approximate date)
- Cyril, Byzantine missionary and bishop (d. 885)
- Doseon, Korean Buddhist monk (d. 898)
- Thābit ibn Qurra, Muslim astronomer and physician (d. 901)

== Deaths ==
- Ashot I, prince of Iberia (or 830)
- Ashot Msaker, prince of Armenia
- Bai Xingjian, Chinese poet and writer (b. 776)
- Beornwulf, king of Mercia
- Fujiwara no Fuyutsugu, Japanese general (b. 775)
- Heondeok, king of Silla (Korea)
- Li Guangyan, Chinese general (b. 761)
- Li Wu, prince of the Tang Dynasty
- Theodore the Studite, Byzantine abbot (b. 759)
- Wu Yantong, Chinese Buddhist monk
- Zhu Kerong, Chinese governor (jiedushi)
