= 828 =

Calendar year

828 in various calendars
- Gregorian calendar: 828; DCCCXXVIII
- Ab urbe condita: 1581
- Armenian calendar: 277; ԹՎ ՄՀԷ
- Assyrian calendar: 5578
- Balinese saka calendar: 749–750
- Bengali calendar: 234–235
- Berber calendar: 1778
- Buddhist calendar: 1372
- Burmese calendar: 190
- Byzantine calendar: 6336–6337
- Chinese calendar: 丁未年 (Fire Goat); 3525 or 3318 — to — 戊申年 (Earth Monkey); 3526 or 3319
- Coptic calendar: 544–545
- Discordian calendar: 1994
- Ethiopian calendar: 820–821
- Hebrew calendar: 4588–4589
- Hindu calendars
- Vikram Samvat: 884–885
- Shaka Samvat: 749–750
- Kali Yuga: 3928–3929
- Holocene calendar: 10828
- Iranian calendar: 206–207
- Islamic calendar: 212–213
- Japanese calendar: Tenchō 5 (天長５年)
- Javanese calendar: 724–725
- Julian calendar: 828; DCCCXXVIII
- Korean calendar: 3161
- Minguo calendar: 1084 before ROC 民前1084年
- Nanakshahi calendar: −640
- Seleucid era: 1139/1140 AG
- Thai solar calendar: 1370–1371
- Tibetan calendar: མེ་མོ་ལུག་ལོ་ (female Fire-Sheep); 954 or 573 or −199 — to — ས་ཕོ་སྤྲེ་ལོ་ (male Earth-Monkey); 955 or 574 or −198

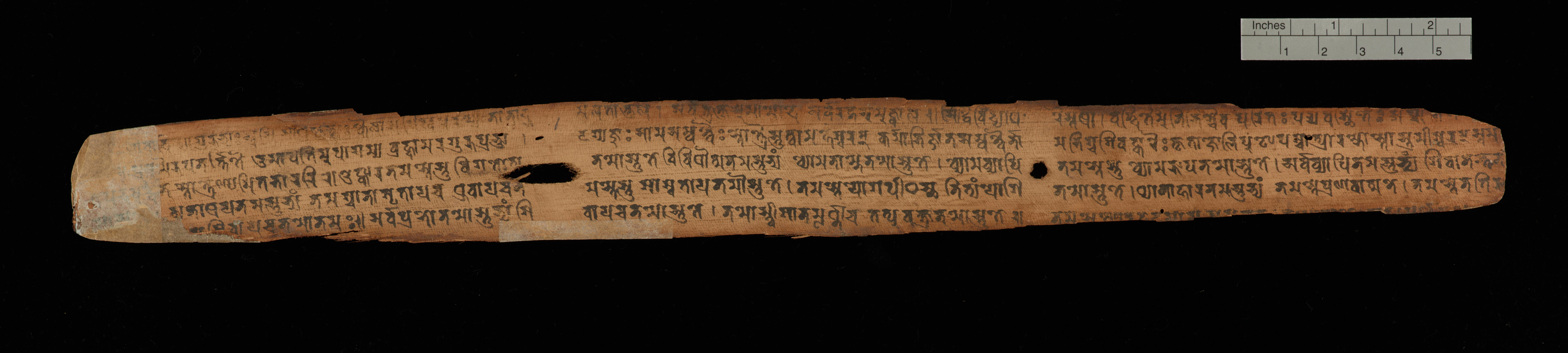
One of the oldest known dated Sanskrit manuscripts from South Asia, this specimen transmits a substantial portion of Pārameśvaratantra, a scripture of the Shaiva Siddhanta, that taught the worship of Shiva as Pārameśvara ("Supreme Lord"). A note in the manuscript states that it was copied in the year 252, which some scholars judge to be of the era established by the Nepalese king Amśuvaran, therefore corresponding to 828 CE. Cambridge University Library

Year 828 (DCCCXXVIII) was a leap year starting on Wednesday of the Julian calendar.

== Events ==
=== By place ===
==== Byzantine Empire ====
- Siege of Syracuse: The Muslims under Asad ibn al-Furat defeat a Byzantine relief army sent from Palermo, and backed by a Venetian fleet led by Giustiniano Participazio. Al-Furat decides to break off the siege at Syracuse, as his forces suffer greatly from lack of food. Later he dies during an outbreak of an epidemic.
- Summer – Euphemius, Byzantine admiral, is murdered by emissaries from the Byzantine garrison at Castrogiovanni, which is besieged by the Muslims. Threatened by Byzantine reinforcements arriving from Constantinople, the survivors burn their ships and retreat overland westward to Mazara del Vallo.

==== Europe ====
- Al-Andalus: The city of Merida (modern Spain) rises twice in one year against the Umayyad Emirate.
- Kydonia, on the northwest coast of Crete, is destroyed by Saracen pirates (approximate date).
- Alcamo in Sicily is founded by the Muslim commander al-Kamuk (approximate date).

==== China ====
- In the capital of Chang'an, a powerful court eunuch orders 50 wrestlers to arrest 300 commoners over a land property dispute in Northwest Chang'an, whereupon a riot breaks out in the streets.

==== North America ====
- The occupation of Pueblo Bonito (present-day New Mexico) begins.

=== By topic ===
==== Religion ====
- Relics of Mark the Evangelist are stolen from Alexandria (controlled by the Abbasid Caliphate) by two Venetian merchants, and brought to Venice.
- At the instigation of Adalram, archbishop of Salzburg, the first Christian church in Central and Eastern Europe is built in Nitra, Pannonia.
- A Coptic revolt breaks out in Egypt (approximate date).

== Births ==
- Ali al-Hadi, 10th Shia Imam
- Al-Dinawari, astronomer and grammarian (d. 889)
- Carloman of Bavaria, Frankish king (or 830)
- Ibn Qutaybah, Muslim scholar (d. 889)
- Yantou Quanhuo, Chinese Chan master (d. 887)

== Deaths ==
- Asad ibn al-Furat, Muslim jurist and theologian (b. 759)
- Euphemius, Byzantine admiral and usuper
- Ibn Hisham, Muslim historian (or 833)
- Idriss II, Muslim emir of Morocco (b. 791)
- Nikephoros I, patriarch of Constantinople
- Talha ibn Tahir, Muslim governor
