= Huainan (disambiguation) =

Huainan (Chinese: 淮南; lit. 'south of the Huai') is a city in Anhui, China

Huainan may also refer to:

- Huainan, the area south of the Huai River and north of the Yangtze River in central Anhui
- Huainan Circuit, one of the major administrative units of the Tang dynasty
- Wu (Ten Kingdoms) (907–937), a state in imperial China's Five Dynasties and Ten Kingdoms period also known as Huainan
- King of Huainan, a noble title in the Han Dynasty (206 BC – 220 AD)
- Huainanzi, a 2nd-century BC Chinese philosophical classic
