= 850 =

Calendar year

850 in various calendars
- Gregorian calendar: 850; DCCCL
- Ab urbe condita: 1603
- Armenian calendar: 299; ԹՎ ՄՂԹ
- Assyrian calendar: 5600
- Balinese saka calendar: 771–772
- Bengali calendar: 256–257
- Berber calendar: 1800
- Buddhist calendar: 1394
- Burmese calendar: 212
- Byzantine calendar: 6358–6359
- Chinese calendar: 己巳年 (Earth Snake); 3547 or 3340 — to — 庚午年 (Metal Horse); 3548 or 3341
- Coptic calendar: 566–567
- Discordian calendar: 2016
- Ethiopian calendar: 842–843
- Hebrew calendar: 4610–4611
- Hindu calendars
- Vikram Samvat: 906–907
- Shaka Samvat: 771–772
- Kali Yuga: 3950–3951
- Holocene calendar: 10850
- Iranian calendar: 228–229
- Islamic calendar: 235–236
- Japanese calendar: Kashō 3 (嘉祥３年)
- Javanese calendar: 747–748
- Julian calendar: 850; DCCCL
- Korean calendar: 3183
- Minguo calendar: 1062 before ROC 民前1062年
- Nanakshahi calendar: −618
- Seleucid era: 1161/1162 AG
- Thai solar calendar: 1392–1393
- Tibetan calendar: ས་མོ་སྦྲུལ་ལོ་ (female Earth-Snake); 976 or 595 or −177 — to — ལྕགས་ཕོ་རྟ་ལོ་ (male Iron-Horse); 977 or 596 or −176

Viking expansion with conquered areas

Year 850 (DCCCL) was a common year starting on Wednesday of the Julian calendar.

== Events ==
=== By place ===
==== Europe ====
- February 1 – King Ramiro I dies in his palace at Santa María del Naranco (near Oviedo), after an 8-year reign. He is succeeded by his son Ordoño I, as ruler of Asturias.
- Danish Viking raiders, led by King Rorik, conquer Dorestad and Utrecht (modern-day Netherlands). Emperor Lothair I recognizes him as ruler of most of Friesland.
- King Louis II, the eldest son of Lothair I, is crowned joint emperor by Pope Leo IV at Rome, and becomes co-ruler of the Middle Frankish Kingdom.

==== Britain ====
- King Kenneth I (also called Kenneth MacAlpin) of Alba (modern Scotland) invades Northern Northumbria during the period of 850–858, burning Dunbar and Melrose.
- The Pillar of Eliseg is erected by King Cyngen ap Cadell of Powys (Wales), as a memorial to his great-grandfather Elisedd ap Gwylog (or Eliseg) (approximate date).

=== Middle East ===
- The Abbasid caliph al-Mutawakkil issues a decree that orders Jews and Christians to wear the zunnar, honey-coloured outer garments and badge-like patches on their on their servants' clothing.

==== Japan ====
- May 6 – Emperor Ninmyō dies after a 17-year reign. He is succeeded by his son Montoku, as the 55th emperor of Japan.

==== India ====
- It is hypothesized that sometime around 850 a group of Buddhist pilgrims travelling through a valley near Roopkund (modern India) were killed when caught out in the open in a sudden hailstorm. Their remains were discovered in 1942.

==== Mesoamerica ====
- Uxmal becomes the capital of a large state in the Puuk hills region of northern Yucatán (modern Mexico). The city is connected by causeways (sakbe) to other important Puuk sites, such as K'abah, Sayil, and Labna (approximate date).

=== By topic ===
==== Food and Drink ====
- Coffee is discovered (according to legend) by the Ethiopian goatherder Kaldi in East Africa, who notices that his goats become energetic after chewing the red berries from certain wild bushes (approximate date).

==== Religion ====
- April 22 – Gunther becomes archbishop of Cologne (modern Germany).
- June 18 – Perfecto, a Christian priest in Muslim Córdoba, is executed (beheaded) after he refuses to retract critical comments he made about Muhammad.

== Births ==
- June 27 – Ibrahim II, emir of the Aghlabids (d. 902)
- Abu Zayd al-Balkhi, Muslim mathematician (d. 934)
- Adelaide, queen of the West Frankish Kingdom (or 853)
- Aribo of Austria, Frankish margrave (approximate date)
- Arnulf of Carinthia, king of the East Frankish Kingdom (d. 899)
- Berno of Cluny, Frankish abbot (approximate date)
- Du Guangting, Chinese Taoist priest and writer (d. 933)
- Gerolf of Holland, count of Friesland (approximate date)
- Harald Fairhair, king of Norway (approximate date)
- Hatto I, Frankish archbishop (approximate date)
- Herbert I, count of Vermandois (approximate date)
- Hermenegildo Gutiérrez, Galician nobleman (d. 912)
- Hucbald, Frankish music theorist (or 840)
- Ki no Tomonori, Japanese poet (approximate date)
- Onneca Fortúnez, Basque princess (or 848)
- Ranulf II, duke of Aquitaine (d. 890)
- Reginar I, duke of Lorraine (approximate date)
- Seiwa, emperor of Japan (d. 878)
- Smbat I, king of Armenia (approximate date)
- Tuotilo, German monk and composer (approximate date)

== Deaths ==
- February 1 – Ramiro I, king of Asturias
- May 6 – Ninmyō, emperor of Japan (b. 808)
- April 18 – Perfectus, Spanish monk and martyr
- July 14 – Wei Fu, Chancellor of the Tang dynasty
- Amalarius, Frankish archbishop (approximate date)
- Bishr the Barefoot (Bishr ibn al-Ḥārith or Bishr al-Ḥāfī), Muslim theologian (approximate date)
- Eanred, king of Northumbria (approximate date)
- Huangbo Xiyun, Chinese Zen Buddhist monk
- Ishaq ibn Ibrahim al-Mus'abi, Muslim official and advisor
- Jayavarman II, founder of the Khmer Empire (approximate date)
- Li Deyu, Chancellor of the Tang dynasty (b. 787)
- Muhammad ibn Mūsā al-Khwārizmī, Persian mathematician
- Maura of Troyes, Frankish noblewoman and saint (b. 827)
- Tachibana no Kachiko, empress of Japan (b. 786)
- Stephen of Liège, Frankish bishop (approximate date)
- Vlastimir, Serbian prince (approximate date)
- William of Septimania, Frankish nobleman (b. 826)
- Zhou Lin, governor (jiedushi) of the Tang dynasty
