= Ali ibn Isa =

Ali ibn Isa can refer to:

- Ali ibn Isa ibn Mahan (died 811), Abbasid military leader
- Ali ibn Isa ibn al-Jarrah (859–946), Abbasid vizier
- Ali ibn Isa al-Asturlabi (9th century), Arab astronomer and geographer
- Ali ibn Isa al-Kahhal (11th century), Arab oculist
