= 889 =

Calendar year

889 in various calendars
Gregorian calendar	889; DCCCLXXXIX
Ab urbe condita	1642
Armenian calendar	338; ԹՎ ՅԼԸ
Assyrian calendar	5639
Balinese saka calendar	810–811
Bengali calendar	295–296
Berber calendar	1839
Buddhist calendar	1433
Burmese calendar	251
Byzantine calendar	6397–6398
Chinese calendar	戊申年 (Earth Monkey); 3586 or 3379 — to — 己酉年 (Earth Rooster); 3587 or 3380
Coptic calendar	605–606
Discordian calendar	2055
Ethiopian calendar	881–882
Hebrew calendar	4649–4650
- Hindu calendars
Vikram Samvat	945–946
Shaka Samvat	810–811
Kali Yuga	3989–3990
Holocene calendar	10889
Iranian calendar	267–268
Islamic calendar	275–276
Japanese calendar	Ninna 5 / Kanpyō 1 (寛平元年)
Javanese calendar	787–788
Julian calendar	889; DCCCLXXXIX
Korean calendar	3222
Minguo calendar	1023 before ROC 民前1023年
Nanakshahi calendar	−579
Seleucid era	1200/1201 AG
Thai solar calendar	1431–1432
Tibetan calendar	ས་ཕོ་སྤྲེ་ལོ་ (male Earth-Monkey); 1015 or 634 or −138 — to — ས་མོ་བྱ་ལོ་ (female Earth-Bird); 1016 or 635 or −137

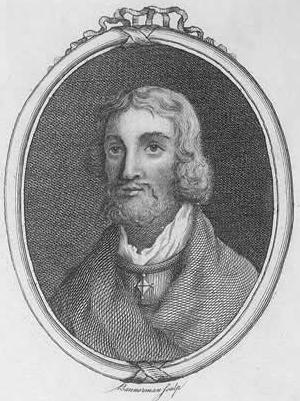
King Donald II of Scotland (c. 860–900)

Year 889 (DCCCLXXXIX) was a common year starting on Wednesday of the Julian calendar.

== Events ==
=== By place ===
==== Europe ====
- Guy III, duke of Spoleto, defeats the Lombard king Berengar I at the Trebbia River, and is acclaimed as king of Italy at an assembly in Pavia. After confirming some privileges to the Catholic Church, he is crowned with the Iron Crown of Lombardy, by Pope Stephen V. Berengar is forced to retreat to Verona; Guy does not pursue him into Friuli, because of the (possible) wrath of King Arnulf of Carinthia.
- Boris I, ruler (khan) of the Bulgarian Empire, abdicates the throne after a 37-year reign, and retires to a monastery. He is succeeded by his eldest son Vladimir, as monarch of Bulgaria. Vladimir falls under the influence of the old boyars; many remain anti-Christian and anti-Byzantine. He attempts to restore the former Frankish alliance, and to reestablish paganism.
- Arnulf of Carinthia has his illegitimate son Zwentibold recognized, as heir of the East Frankish Kingdom. He supports the claim of Louis the Blind as king of Provence, after receiving a personal appeal from Louis's mother, Ermengard, who comes to see Arnulf at Forchheim (Northern Bavaria). Arnulf grants the town of Osnabrück trade and coinage privileges.
- A ship carrying about twenty Arab freebooters, from Pechina in Al-Andalus (modern Spain), sets anchor in the Gulf of Saint-Tropez in Provence. They establish a fortified base at Fraxinet (modern-day La Garde-Freinet). After raiding the surrounding area, the Muslim colony is bolstered by contingents of Saracen adventurers.
- The Magyars, an Ugric tribe from the steppe of Central Asia, move west under the leadership of Árpád. They are pushed by their rivals, the Pechenegs, into the Balkan Peninsula, and become entangled in a war between Bulgaria and the Byzantine Empire. The Magyars head north and settle in Great Moravia.
- In Italy, Forlì becomes a republic for the first time. The city is allied with the Ghibelline faction, in the medieval struggles between the Guelphs and Ghibellines.
- In Portugal, the count of Coimbra, Hermenegildo Gutiérrez, reconquers Coimbra, which was temporarily lost after the first conquest of 878.

==== Britain ====
- Kings Eochaid and Giric of Alba and Strathclyde (modern Scotland) are deposed by Viking invaders. They are succeeded by Donald II, the son of the late Constantine I, who becomes king of Scotland.
- Lord Æthelred II and Lady Æthelflæd (a daughter of king Alfred the Great) of the Mercians begin their policy of fortifying Mercian cities as defensive burghs, starting with Worcester (approximate date).

==== Asia ====
- The Unified Silla kingdom (modern Korea) under King Jinseong seeks to collect taxes by force from peasants, setting off massive peasant rebellions (approximate date).
- Indravarman I, ruler of the Khmer Empire (modern Cambodia), dies and is succeeded by his son Yasovarman I, called the Leper King (or 890).
- April – The Japanese era Ninna ends and Kanpyō begins, lasting until 898.

=== By topic ===
==== Religion ====
- Bongwon Temple, located in Seoul (modern South Korea), is founded by the Korean Buddhist master Doseon.

== Births ==
- January 7 – Li Bian, emperor of Southern Tang (d. 943)
- January 11 – Abd al-Rahman III, Muslim caliph (or 891)
- Liu Yan, emperor of Southern Han (d. 942)
- Minamoto no Kintada, Japanese waka poet (d. 948)

== Deaths ==
- June 9 – Aimoin, Frankish monk and archivist
- December 23 – Solomon II, bishop of Constance
- Bořivoj I, duke of Bohemia (approximate date)
- Ibn Marwan, Muslim Sufi leader (approximate date)
- Ibn Qutaybah, Muslim scholar (b. 828)
- Indravarman I, king of the Khmer Empire (or 890)
- Judicael, duke of Brittany (or 888)
- Liutbert, archbishop of Mainz
- Meng Fangli, Chinese warlord
- Qin Zongquan, Chinese warlord
- Sa'id ibn Makhlad, Muslim vizier
- Wang Jingwu, Chinese warlord
- Wilbert, archbishop of Cologne
- Zhao Chou, Chinese warlord (b. 824)
- Zhao Huang, Chinese warlord
