= AD 888 =

Calendar year

888 in various calendars
- Gregorian calendar: 888; DCCCLXXXVIII
- Ab urbe condita: 1641
- Armenian calendar: 337; ԹՎ ՅԼԷ
- Assyrian calendar: 5638
- Balinese saka calendar: 809–810
- Bengali calendar: 294–295
- Berber calendar: 1838
- Buddhist calendar: 1432
- Burmese calendar: 250
- Byzantine calendar: 6396–6397
- Chinese calendar: 丁未年 (Fire Goat); 3585 or 3378 — to — 戊申年 (Earth Monkey); 3586 or 3379
- Coptic calendar: 604–605
- Discordian calendar: 2054
- Ethiopian calendar: 880–881
- Hebrew calendar: 4648–4649
- Hindu calendars
- Vikram Samvat: 944–945
- Shaka Samvat: 809–810
- Kali Yuga: 3988–3989
- Holocene calendar: 10888
- Iranian calendar: 266–267
- Islamic calendar: 274–275
- Japanese calendar: Ninna 4 (仁和４年)
- Javanese calendar: 786–787
- Julian calendar: 888; DCCCLXXXVIII
- Korean calendar: 3221
- Minguo calendar: 1024 before ROC 民前1024年
- Nanakshahi calendar: −580
- Seleucid era: 1199/1200 AG
- Thai solar calendar: 1430–1431
- Tibetan calendar: མེ་མོ་ལུག་ལོ་ (female Fire-Sheep); 1014 or 633 or −139 — to — ས་ཕོ་སྤྲེ་ལོ་ (male Earth-Monkey); 1015 or 634 or −138

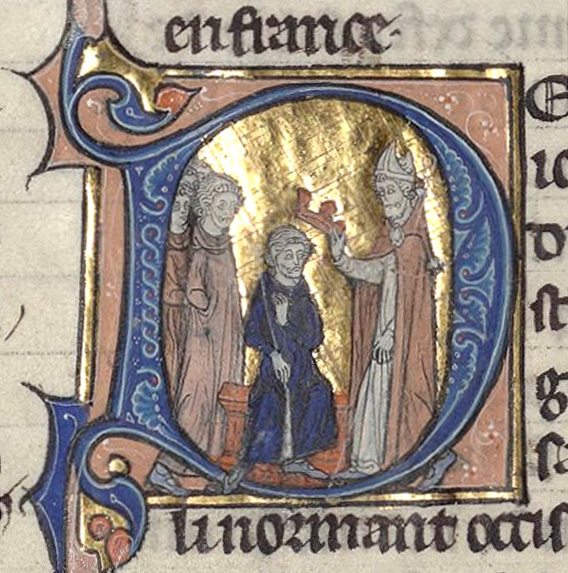
Coronation of Odo of France (888–898)

Year 888 (DCCCLXXXVIII) was a leap year starting on Monday of the Julian calendar.

== Events ==
=== By place ===
==== Europe ====
- January 13 – Emperor Charles III (the Fat) dies at Neidingen, after having suffered repeat bouts of an illness that may have been epilepsy. The Frankish Empire is split again, and falls apart into separate kingdoms. Count Odo, the hero of the Siege of Paris, is elected king of the West Frankish Kingdom, and crowned at Compiègne by Walter, archbishop of Sens. Other Frankish noblemen support the 8-year-old Charles the Simple (the posthumous son of the late king Louis the Stammerer).
- October – Alan I (the Great), count of Vannes, and his rival Judicael, unite their forces to defeat the Vikings at Questembert (or 889). Judicael is killed, in a notable victory for the Bretons, with 15,000 Vikings crushed, some few 400 escaping to their ships. In command of a 'united' Breton force, Alan is able to drive the Vikings back to the Loire River. Alan becomes sole ruler of Brittany, and over the Frankish counties of Rennes, Nantes, Coutances and Avranches.
- October – Battle of Milazzo: The Aghlabids score a crushing victory over a Byzantine fleet off Sicily.
- Winter – King Arnulf of Carinthia leads an East Frankish expedition into Italy, after he is recognized as overlord of France and Burgundy. Arnulf descends with an army over the Brenner Pass, and meets King Berengar I at a peace conference at Trento. Berengar grants him two counties in the Val d'Adige (Northern Italy), and does homage to Arnulf as overlord. In turn, Arnulf confirms Berengar as king of Lombardia, and returns to Germany.
- Lord Æthelred II of the Mercians is struck down with a debilitating illness. His wife, Princess Æthelflæd (a daughter of Alfred the Great) of Wessex, joins him as joint ruler of Mercia (approximate date).
- The Aghlabids issue decrees according to which Jews and Christians are to wear a patch (ruq'a) of white fabric on their shoulder of their outer garment, with the patch for Jews depicting an ape and that for the Christians depicting a pig.
- Adarnase IV managed to unify most Georgian lands (except for Kakheti and Abkhazia) and was crowned King of the Iberians, restoring the monarchy abolished three centuries prior.

==== Al-Andalus ====
- Al-Mundhir, Moorish emir of Córdoba, dies after a two-year reign (possibly murdered by his brother Abdullah ibn Muhammad al-Umawi, who succeeds him as ruler of the Emirate of Córdoba).

==== China ====
- April 20 – Emperor Xi Zong (Li Xuan) dies of illness at Chang'an, after a 14-year reign. He is succeeded by his 21-year-old brother Zhao Zong, as ruler of the Tang Dynasty.

=== By topic ===
==== Religion ====
- Shaftesbury Abbey is founded by King Alfred the Great in Dorset. He installs his daughter Æthelgifu as first abbess (approximate date).

== Births ==
- October 20 – Zhu Youzhen, emperor of Later Liang (d. 923)
- Liu Xu, chancellor of Later Tang and Later Jin (d. 947)
- Vratislaus I, duke of Bohemia (approximate date)
- Zhu Yougui, emperor of Later Liang (approximate date)

== Deaths ==
- January 13 – Charles the Fat, Frankish emperor (b. 839)
- April 20 – Xi Zong, emperor of the Tang Dynasty (b. 862)
- June 11 – Rimbert, archbishop of Bremen (b. 830)
- June 30 – Æthelred, archbishop of Canterbury
- Áed mac Conchobair, king of Connacht (Ireland)
- Æthelswith, Anglo-Saxon queen
- Al-Mundhir, Muslim emir of Córdoba
- Cerball mac Dúnlainge, king of Osraige (Ireland)
- Ingelger, founder of the House of Anjou
- Judicael, duke of Brittany (or 889)
- Le Yanzhen, Chinese warlord
- Nasra of Tao-Klarjeti, Georgian prince
- Sichfrith mac Ímair, king of Dublin
- Tetbert, Frankish nobleman
- Zhang Gui, Chinese warlord
- Zhou Bao, Chinese general (b. 814)
