= 887 =

Calendar year

887 in various calendars
- Gregorian calendar: 887; DCCCLXXXVII
- Ab urbe condita: 1640
- Armenian calendar: 336; ԹՎ ՅԼԶ
- Assyrian calendar: 5637
- Balinese saka calendar: 808–809
- Bengali calendar: 293–294
- Berber calendar: 1837
- Buddhist calendar: 1431
- Burmese calendar: 249
- Byzantine calendar: 6395–6396
- Chinese calendar: 丙午年 (Fire Horse); 3584 or 3377 — to — 丁未年 (Fire Goat); 3585 or 3378
- Coptic calendar: 603–604
- Discordian calendar: 2053
- Ethiopian calendar: 879–880
- Hebrew calendar: 4647–4648
- Hindu calendars
- Vikram Samvat: 943–944
- Shaka Samvat: 808–809
- Kali Yuga: 3987–3988
- Holocene calendar: 10887
- Iranian calendar: 265–266
- Islamic calendar: 273–274
- Japanese calendar: Ninna 3 (仁和３年)
- Javanese calendar: 785–786
- Julian calendar: 887; DCCCLXXXVII
- Korean calendar: 3220
- Minguo calendar: 1025 before ROC 民前1025年
- Nanakshahi calendar: −581
- Seleucid era: 1198/1199 AG
- Thai solar calendar: 1429–1430
- Tibetan calendar: མེ་ཕོ་རྟ་ལོ་ (male Fire-Horse); 1013 or 632 or −140 — to — མེ་མོ་ལུག་ལོ་ (female Fire-Sheep); 1014 or 633 or −139

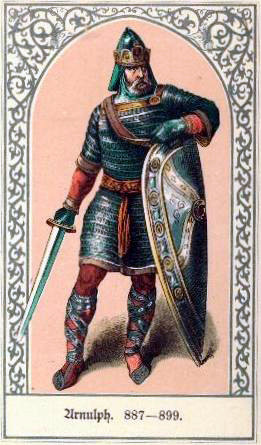
King Arnulf of Carinthia (c. 850–899)

Year 887 (DCCCLXXXVII) was a common year starting on Sunday of the Julian calendar.

== Events ==
=== By place ===
==== Europe ====
- November 17 – East Frankish magnates revolt against the inept emperor Charles III (the Fat) in an assembly at Frankfurt, and depose him. His nephew Arnulf of Carinthia, the illegitimate son of former king Carloman of Bavaria, is elected ruler of the East Frankish Kingdom. Charles yields his throne without a struggle, and retires to Neidingen.
- December 26 – In an assembly at Pavia (Northern Italy), the lords of Lombardia elect Berengar I, a grandson of former emperor Louis the Pious (through his daughter Gisela), as king of Italy. He is crowned with the Iron Crown of Lombardy. After the deposition of Charles the Fat, the nobility chooses Ranulf II as duke (or 'king') of Aquitaine.

==== Japan ====
- August 26 – Emperor Kōkō abdicates the throne and soon dies, after a 3-year reign. He is succeeded by his 20-year-old son Uda, as the 59th emperor of Japan.

==== Al-Andalus ====
- The city of Toledo rises against the Umayyad Dynasty, in Al-Andalus (modern Spain).

=== By topic ===
==== Religion ====
- February 5 – Theodosius Romanus ascends as Syriac Orthodox patriarch of Antioch.

== Births ==
- Frederuna, queen of the West Frankish Kingdom (d. 917)
- Qian Yuanguan, king of Wuyue (Ten Kingdoms) (d. 941)
- Song Qiqiu, chief strategist of Southern Tang (d. 959)

== Deaths ==
- January 11 – Boso of Provence, Frankish nobleman
- April 6 – Pei Che, chancellor of the Tang Dynasty
- July 6 – Wang Chongrong, Chinese warlord
- August 26 – Kōkō, emperor of Japan (b. 830)
- September 18 – Pietro I Candiano, doge of Venice
- September 24 – Gao Pian, general of the Tang Dynasty
- Abbas ibn Firnas, Muslim physician and inventor (b. 810)
- Ibn Majah, Muslim hadith compiler (or 889)
- Jeonggang, king of Silla (modern Korea)
- Xiao Gou, chancellor of the Tang Dynasty
- Yantou Quanhuo, Chinese Chan master (b. 828)
- Zheng Changtu, chancellor of the Tang Dynasty
- Zhu Mei, Chinese warlord (approximate date)
- Sigurd Ragnarsson, King of Denmark
