= 890 =

Calendar year

890 in various calendars
- Gregorian calendar: 890; DCCCXC
- Ab urbe condita: 1643
- Armenian calendar: 339; ԹՎ ՅԼԹ
- Assyrian calendar: 5640
- Balinese saka calendar: 811–812
- Bengali calendar: 296–297
- Berber calendar: 1840
- Buddhist calendar: 1434
- Burmese calendar: 252
- Byzantine calendar: 6398–6399
- Chinese calendar: 己酉年 (Earth Rooster); 3587 or 3380 — to — 庚戌年 (Metal Dog); 3588 or 3381
- Coptic calendar: 606–607
- Discordian calendar: 2056
- Ethiopian calendar: 882–883
- Hebrew calendar: 4650–4651
- Hindu calendars
- Vikram Samvat: 946–947
- Shaka Samvat: 811–812
- Kali Yuga: 3990–3991
- Holocene calendar: 10890
- Iranian calendar: 268–269
- Islamic calendar: 276–277
- Japanese calendar: Kanpyō 2 (寛平２年)
- Javanese calendar: 788–789
- Julian calendar: 890; DCCCXC
- Korean calendar: 3223
- Minguo calendar: 1022 before ROC 民前1022年
- Nanakshahi calendar: −578
- Seleucid era: 1201/1202 AG
- Thai solar calendar: 1432–1433
- Tibetan calendar: ས་མོ་བྱ་ལོ་ (female Earth-Bird); 1016 or 635 or −137 — to — ལྕགས་ཕོ་ཁྱི་ལོ་ (male Iron-Dog); 1017 or 636 or −136

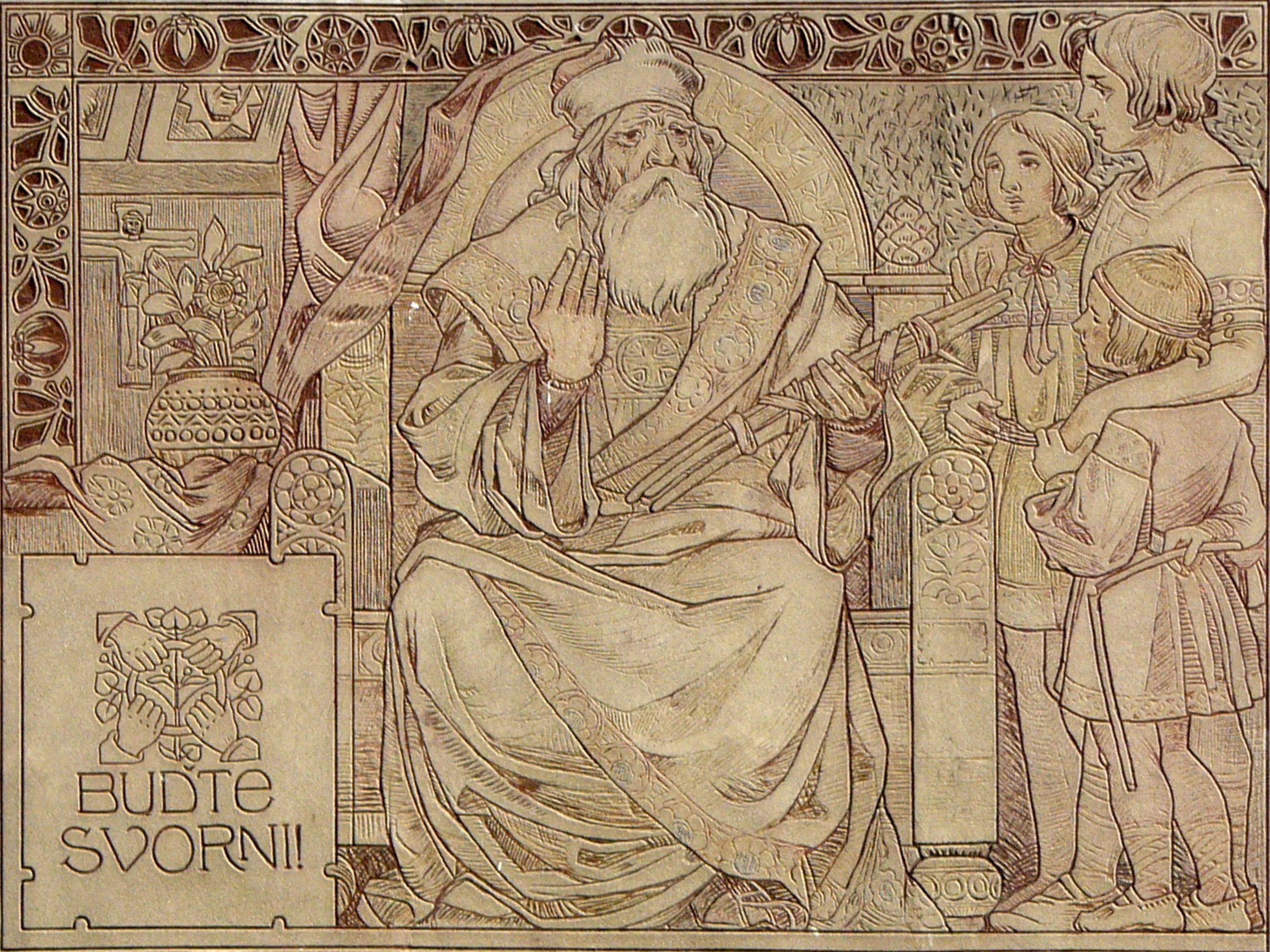
Svatopluk I of Moravia with his three sons.

Year 890 (DCCCXC) was a common year starting on Thursday of the Julian calendar, the 890th year of the Common Era (CE) and Anno Domini (AD) designations, the 890th year of the 1st millennium, the 90th year of the 9th century, and the 1st year of the 890s decade.

== Events ==
=== By place ===
==== Europe ====
- The Frankish nobles, who have ruled Provence in anarchy (since 887), declare Louis the Blind (a son of the late usurper King Boso) ruler of Lower Burgundy, at an assembly at Valence.
- The sovereignty of Svatopluk I, ruler (knyaz) of Moravia, is confirmed in Bohemia. Lusatia becomes a part of his kingdom (approximate date).

===== Britain =====
- King Alfred the Great begins to commission and undertake a series of translations into Old English, beginning with his own version of Pope Gregory the Great's Pastoral Care.
- Lord Æthelred II and Lady Æthelflæd (a daughter of Alfred the Great) of the Mercians found the Priory of St. Oswald in Gloucester (probably originally dedicated to St. Peter).
- Ohthere of Hålogaland, a Norse Viking seafarer, narrates the story of his travels to Alfred the Great, who arranges for it to be written down.
- King Anarawd ap Rhodri of Gwynedd makes the first ceremonial visit to an English court (that of Alfred the Great).
- King Donald II of Scotland expels the British aristocracy of Strathclyde. They flee south to North Wales.

==== Asia ====
- In March or April 890, the ambitious warlord Zhu Quanzhong (later called Zhu Wen) faced a mutiny at Suzhou and was unable to retake the city. He pressured Emperor Zhaozong of Tang China to launch a campaign against his primary rival, Li Keyong. By winter 890, Zhu strategically shifted his focus northward, giving up his claim to the Huainan Circuit after failing to take it.

== Births ==
- Arnulf I, count of Flanders (approximate date)
- Gilbert, duke of Lotharingia (or Lorraine) (approximate date)
- Gorm the Old, Danish Viking king (approximate date)
- Lady Ma, wife of Qian Yuanguan (d. 939)
- Marozia of the Rule of the Harlots, Roman noblewoman (approximate date)
- Motoyoshi, Japanese prince and nobleman (d. 943)
- Olaf Feilan, Icelandic priest and chieftain (approximate date)
- Olga of Kiev, princess and regent of Russia (approximate date)
- Reginar II, Frankish nobleman (d. 932)
- Rudolph, Frankish king (approximate date)
- Ulrich, bishop of Augsburg (approximate date)

== Deaths ==
- February 12 – Henjō, Japanese waka poet (b. 816)
- August 5 – Ranulf II, duke of Aquitaine (b. 850)
- Arib al-Ma'muniyya (July/August) was the poet, singer of the Abbasid Court.
- Æthelhelm, king of Wessex (approximate date)
- Abu Hatim al-Razi, Muslim hadith scholar (b. 811)
- Anandavardhana, Indian philosopher (b. 820)
- Adalard, Frankish nobleman
- Aldalhard II, Frankish nobleman
- Ashot I (the Great), king of Armenia
- Askericus, archbishop of Paris (approximate date)
- Guthrum, Danish Viking king (approximate date)
- Land ingen Dúngaile, princess of Osraige
