= 759 =

Calendar year

759 in various calendars
Gregorian calendar	759; DCCLIX
Ab urbe condita	1512
Armenian calendar	208; ԹՎ ՄԸ
Assyrian calendar	5509
Balinese saka calendar	680–681
Bengali calendar	165–166
Berber calendar	1709
Buddhist calendar	1303
Burmese calendar	121
Byzantine calendar	6267–6268
Chinese calendar	戊戌年 (Earth Dog); 3456 or 3249 — to — 己亥年 (Earth Pig); 3457 or 3250
Coptic calendar	475–476
Discordian calendar	1925
Ethiopian calendar	751–752
Hebrew calendar	4519–4520
- Hindu calendars
Vikram Samvat	815–816
Shaka Samvat	680–681
Kali Yuga	3859–3860
Holocene calendar	10759
Iranian calendar	137–138
Islamic calendar	141–142
Japanese calendar	Tenpyō-hōji 3 (天平宝字３年)
Javanese calendar	653–654
Julian calendar	759; DCCLIX
Korean calendar	3092
Minguo calendar	1153 before ROC 民前1153年
Nanakshahi calendar	−709
Seleucid era	1070/1071 AG
Thai solar calendar	1301–1302
Tibetan calendar	ས་ཕོ་ཁྱི་ལོ་ (male Earth-Dog); 885 or 504 or −268 — to — ས་མོ་ཕག་ལོ་ (female Earth-Boar); 886 or 505 or −267

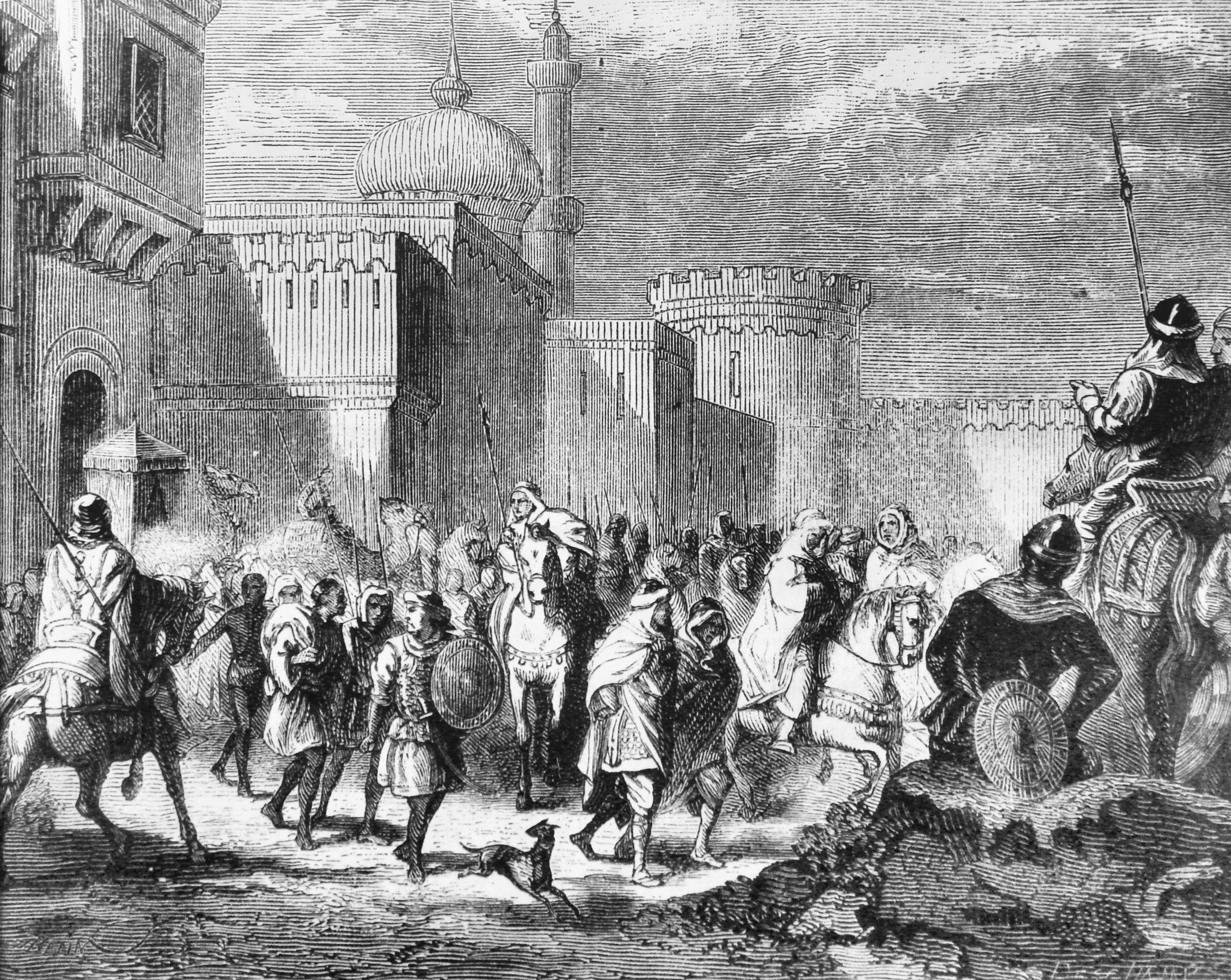
Muslim troops leaving Narbonne to Pepin III

Year 759 (DCCLIX) was a common year starting on Monday of the Julian calendar. The denomination 759 for this year has been used since the early medieval period, when the Anno Domini calendar era became the prevalent method in Europe for naming years.

== Events ==
=== By place ===
==== Byzantine Empire ====
- Battle of the Rishki Pass: Emperor Constantine V invades Bulgaria again, but his forces are ambushed and defeated while crossing the Rishki Pass, near Stara Planina (modern Bulgaria). The Bulgarian ruler (khagan) Vinekh does not exploit his success, and begins peace negotiations.

==== Europe ====
- Siege of Narbonne: The Franks under King Pepin III ("the Short") retake Narbonne from the Muslims, after a 7-year siege. He pushes them back across the Pyrenees, and the Muslims retreat to the Andalusian heartland after 40 years of occupation. The government of the city is assigned to the Visigothic count Miló.

==== Britain ====
- July 24 – King Oswulf of Northumbria is murdered by members of his own household (his servants or bodyguards), at Market Weighton. The Deiran patrician, Æthelwald Moll, who probably conspired in the regicide, is crowned king of Northumbria. He may have been a descendant of the late king Oswine of Deira.
- Exceptional winter in England: Frost begins October 1, and ends February 26, 760.

==== Abbasid Caliphate ====
- Caliph al-Mansur of the Abbasid Caliphate launches the conquest of Tabaristan (on the southern coast of the Caspian Sea). Its ruler, Khurshid II, flees into the mountainous region of Daylam.

==== Asia ====
- An Lushan Rebellion: Tang forces under Guo Ziyi lay siege to the city of Yanjing (Northern China) as they increase their efforts to end the rebellion. The fighting creates such a shortage of food within its walls that rats sell at enormous prices.
- Otomo no Yakamochi, Japanese general, compiles the first Japanese poetry anthology, Man'yōshū. It contains some 500 poems by Japanese poets who include the emperor, noblemen and commoners.
- December 24 – Tang dynasty poet Du Fu departs for Chengdu, where he is hosted by fellow poet Pei Di.

=== By topic ===
==== Religion ====
- The Tōshōdai-ji Buddhist Temple is founded in Nara, Japan.

== Births ==
- Alfonso II, king of Asturias (d. 842)
- Asad ibn al-Furat, Muslim jurist and theologian (d. 828)
- Gregory of Khandzta, Georgian archimandrite (d. 861)
- Quan Deyu, chancellor of the Tang dynasty (d. 818)
- Theodore the Studite, Byzantine abbot (d. 826)
- Wang Shizhen, general of the Tang dynasty (d. 809)
- Wu Yantong, Chinese Buddhist monk (approximate date)

== Deaths ==
- July 24 – Oswulf, king of Northumbria
- Edburga, Anglo-Saxon abbess
- Dúngal mac Amalgado, king of Brega (Ireland)
- Othmar, Swiss abbot (approximate date)
- Wang Wei, Chinese poet (b. 699)
