= 861 =

Calendar year

861 in various calendars
Gregorian calendar	861; DCCCLXI
Ab urbe condita	1614
Armenian calendar	310; ԹՎ ՅԺ
Assyrian calendar	5611
Balinese saka calendar	782–783
Bengali calendar	267–268
Berber calendar	1811
Buddhist calendar	1405
Burmese calendar	223
Byzantine calendar	6369–6370
Chinese calendar	庚辰年 (Metal Dragon); 3558 or 3351 — to — 辛巳年 (Metal Snake); 3559 or 3352
Coptic calendar	577–578
Discordian calendar	2027
Ethiopian calendar	853–854
Hebrew calendar	4621–4622
- Hindu calendars
Vikram Samvat	917–918
Shaka Samvat	782–783
Kali Yuga	3961–3962
Holocene calendar	10861
Iranian calendar	239–240
Islamic calendar	246–247
Japanese calendar	Jōgan 3 (貞観３年)
Javanese calendar	758–759
Julian calendar	861; DCCCLXI
Korean calendar	3194
Minguo calendar	1051 before ROC 民前1051年
Nanakshahi calendar	−607
Seleucid era	1172/1173 AG
Thai solar calendar	1403–1404
Tibetan calendar	ལྕགས་ཕོ་འབྲུག་ལོ་ (male Iron-Dragon); 987 or 606 or −166 — to — ལྕགས་མོ་སྦྲུལ་ལོ་ (female Iron-Snake); 988 or 607 or −165

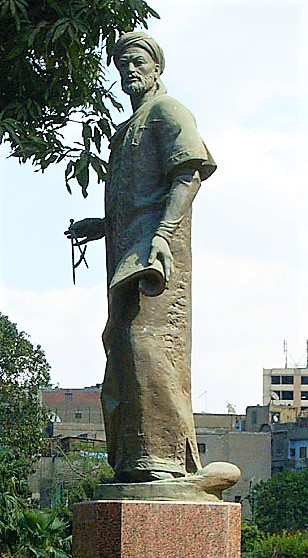
Statue of Al-Farghani, Rhoda Island (Egypt)

Year 861 (DCCCLXI) was a common year starting on Wednesday of the Julian calendar.

== Events ==
=== By place ===
==== Europe ====
- March – Robert the Strong is appointed margrave of Neustria by King Charles the Bald. He re-establishes the Breton March, and extends his remit by campaigning against Salomon, duke 'king' of Brittany. Robert hires a combined Seine-Loire fleet for 6,000 pounds of silver, 'before Salomon can ally with them against him'. In return, Salomon enlists 12 Viking ships under the command of Hastein, to raid the county of Maine, which, with Anjou, becomes squeezed between Brittany and Neustria.
- Spring – The Council of Constantinople, attended by 318 fathers and presided over by papal legates, confirms Photius the Great as patriarch, and passes 17 canons.
- Carloman, eldest son of King Louis the German, revolts against his father. He is captured, but manages to escape to the Ostmark (or 862).
- Summer – Viking raiders sack the cities of Paris, Cologne, Aachen, Worms and Toulouse.

==== Abbasid Caliphate ====
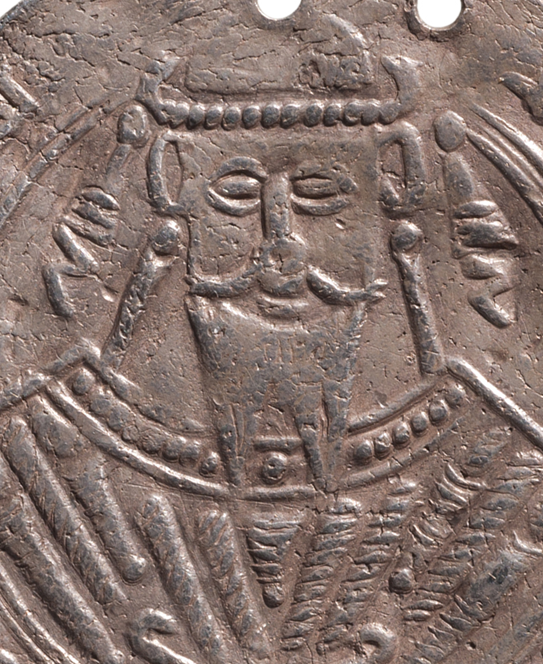
Dirham Bust of Al-Mutawakkil. He was assassinated by his Turkic guards and his son on the night of 11 December 861

- December 11 – Caliph al-Mutawakkil is assassinated by his Turkish guard, starting the period of troubles known as the "Anarchy at Samarra" (861–870). He is succeeded by his son Al-Muntasir, as ruler of the Abbasid Caliphate.
- Ya'qub ibn al-Layth, a Muslim military leader, starts rebelling against the Abbasids and founds the Saffarid Dynasty in the 870s. He rules over parts of Khurasan and eastern Iran, and establishes his capital at Zaranj (modern Afghanistan).

=== By topic ===
==== Hydrology ====
- Al-Mutawakkil (r. 847–861) orders the construction of a Nilometer on Rhoda Island in central Cairo, supervised by the Persian astronomer Ahmad ibn Muhammad ibn Kathir al-Farghani.

== Births ==
- Abdullah ibn al-Mu'tazz, Muslim poet (d. 908)
- Abu Bakr Shibli, Muslim Sufi (d. 946)
- Al-Mu'tadid, Muslim caliph (or 854)
- Heongang, king of Silla (approximate date)

== Deaths ==
- Shuja also known as Umm Jaʽfar was the mother of Abbasid caliph Al-Mutawakkil.
- April 6 – Prudentius, bishop of Troyes
- December 11
  - Al-Mutawakkil, Abbasid caliph (b. 822), On the night of 11 December, about one hour after midnight, the Turk guards burst in the chamber where the Caliph and al-Fath were having supper. Al-Fath was killed trying to protect the Caliph, who was killed next. His son, Al-Muntasir, who now assumed the caliphate, initially claimed that al-Fath had murdered his father, and that he had been killed after; within a short time, however, the official story changed to al-Mutawakkil choking on his drink.
  - al-Fath ibn Khaqan, chief confidante and councillor of al-Mutawakkil
- Ahmad ibn Muhammad ibn Kathir al-Farghani, Persian astronomer
- Álvaro of Córdoba, Mozarab scholar and theologian
- Ansovinus, bishop of Camerino (approximate date)
- Bai Minzhong, chancellor of the Tang Dynasty (b. 792)
- Gladilanus, Galician clergyman (approximate date)
- Gregory of Khandzta, Georgian archimandrite (b. 759)
- Heonan, king of Silla (Korea)
- Princess Ito of Japan
- Lando I, count of Capua
- Meinrad of Einsiedeln, German hermit and martyr
- Pribina, Slavic prince (approximate date)
- Samuel of Kakheti, Georgian prince
