= Khalid ibn Abd al-Malik al-Marwarrudhi =

9th-century Baghdadi astronomer

Khālid ibn ʿAbd al‐Malik al‐Marwarrūdhī
- خالد بن عبدالملك المرو الروذي
- Born: fl. 9th century

Academic work
- Era: Islamic Golden Age
- Main interests: Astronomy

Khālid ibn ʿAbd al‐Malik al‐Marwarrūdhī (Arabic: خالد بن عبدالملك المرو الروذي) was a 9th-century Baghdadi astronomer.

In 827, Marwarrūdhī, together with the astronomer ʿAlī ibn ʿĪsā al-Asṭurlābī and a party of surveyors, measured the length of a meridian arc of one degree of latitude. The party travelled to the Nineveh Plains in the valley of the Tigris, at 35 degrees north latitude. The measurement they obtained enabled the astronomers to obtain a value of 40,248 kilometres (25,009 mi) for the circumference of the Earth, (or, according to other sources, 41,436 kilometres (25,747 mi)). The two researchers measured in Arabian ell, and determined the geographical latitudes of the end points they used from the star altitudes in a celestial horizontal coordinate system. As it is thought that one Arabian ell represented 49.33 centimetres (19.42 in), they found the length of 1° of meridian to be 111.8 kilometres (69.5 mi), which differs from the true value by 850 metres (2,790 ft).

Marwarrūdhī was chosen by the geometer Al-Abbās ibn Said al-Jawharī to organize a new observatory on Mount Qasioun. Despite encountering technical difficulties caused by the distortion of the astronomical instruments, in c. 832 he spent a year obtaining of solar and lunar observations of the Sun and the Moon. He played a role in the project c. 843/84 determine the length of the spring season by means of astronomical observations.

Marwarrūdhī was the first of three generations of astronomers.

== Sources ==
- Bolt, Marvin (2007). "Marwarrūdhī: Khālid ibn ʿAbd al‐Malik al‐Marwarrūdhī". In Thomas Hockey; et al. (eds.). The Biographical Encyclopedia of Astronomers. New York: Springer. p. 740. ISBN 978-0-387-31022-0. (PDF version)
- Çelebi, Kâtip (2017). Atta, M. A. (ed.). Kashf al-Zunun (in Arabic). Vol. 6. Dar Al Kotob Al Ilmiyah.
