= 830 =

Calendar year

830 in various calendars
- Gregorian calendar: 830; DCCCXXX
- Ab urbe condita: 1583
- Armenian calendar: 279; ԹՎ ՄՀԹ
- Assyrian calendar: 5580
- Balinese saka calendar: 751–752
- Bengali calendar: 236–237
- Berber calendar: 1780
- Buddhist calendar: 1374
- Burmese calendar: 192
- Byzantine calendar: 6338–6339
- Chinese calendar: 己酉年 (Earth Rooster); 3527 or 3320 — to — 庚戌年 (Metal Dog); 3528 or 3321
- Coptic calendar: 546–547
- Discordian calendar: 1996
- Ethiopian calendar: 822–823
- Hebrew calendar: 4590–4591
- Hindu calendars
- Vikram Samvat: 886–887
- Shaka Samvat: 751–752
- Kali Yuga: 3930–3931
- Holocene calendar: 10830
- Iranian calendar: 208–209
- Islamic calendar: 214–215
- Japanese calendar: Tenchō 7 (天長７年)
- Javanese calendar: 726–727
- Julian calendar: 830; DCCCXXX
- Korean calendar: 3163
- Minguo calendar: 1082 before ROC 民前1082年
- Nanakshahi calendar: −638
- Seleucid era: 1141/1142 AG
- Thai solar calendar: 1372–1373
- Tibetan calendar: ས་མོ་བྱ་ལོ་ (female Earth-Bird); 956 or 575 or −197 — to — ལྕགས་ཕོ་ཁྱི་ལོ་ (male Iron-Dog); 957 or 576 or −196

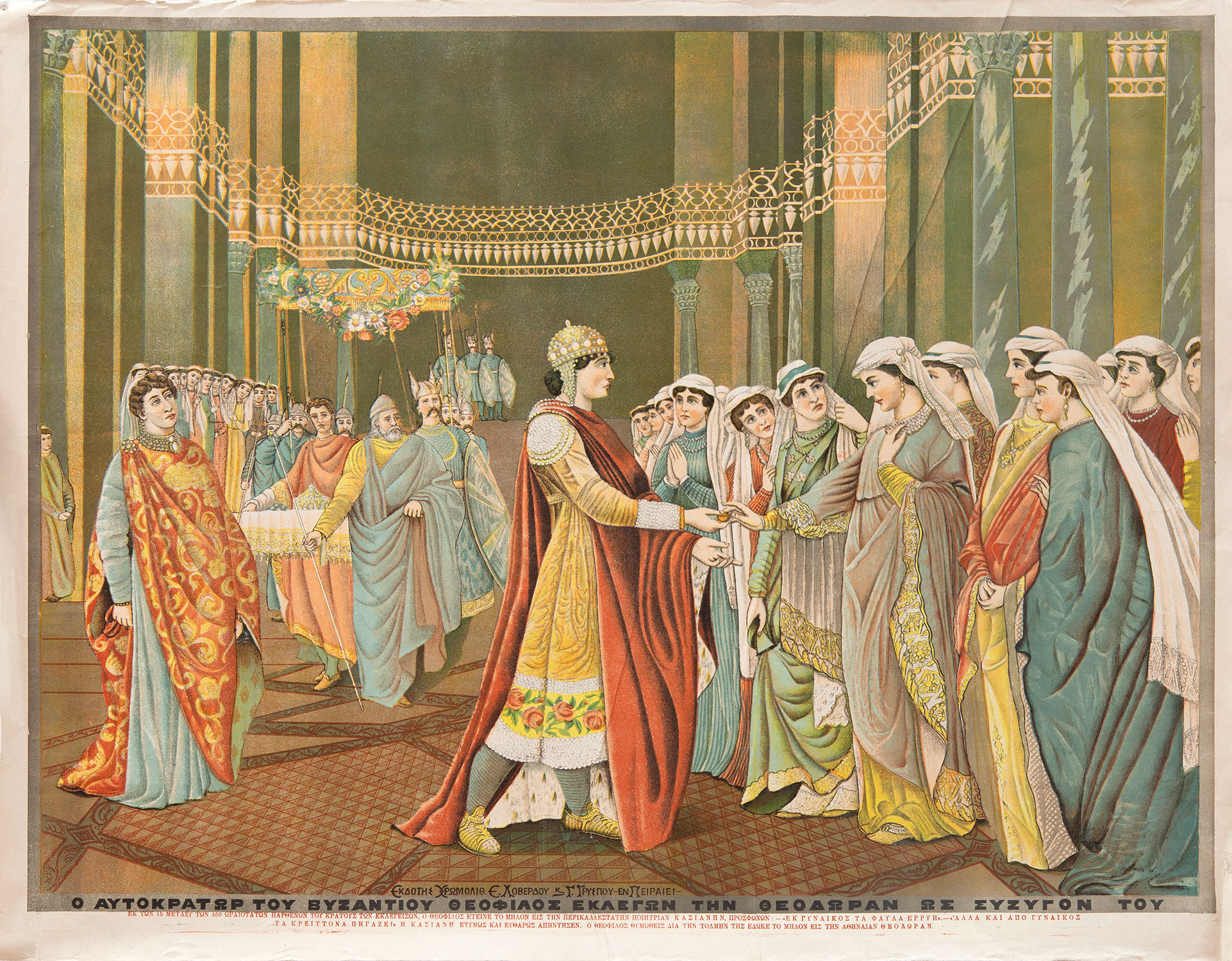
Theophilos chooses Theodora as his wife

Year 830 (DCCCXXX) was a common year starting on Saturday of the Julian calendar.

== Events ==
=== By place ===
==== Britain ====
- King Wiglaf of Mercia regains control from Wessex, and returns to the throne.

==== Byzantine Empire ====
- June 5 – Emperor Theophilos, 16, marries the Armenian noblewoman Theodora, in the Hagia Sophia at Constantinople. He chooses her during a representation of a bride-show; she becomes empress (Augusta) of the Byzantine Empire.
- Byzantine–Arab War: Muslim reinforcements from Ifriqiya and Al-Andalus (modern Spain) defeat Byzantine forces under Theodotus in Sicily, but a plague once again compels them to retreat to Mazara del Vallo, and evacuate to North Africa.

==== Europe ====
- Emperor Louis the Pious returns from a campaign in Brittany, and is captured by his son Pepin I, king of Aquitaine. He is put under house arrest at Compiegne, and his wife Judith is incarcerated at Poitiers.

==== North Africa ====
- The Ad-dimnah Hospital (bimaristan) is created in Kairouan (modern Tunisia), by the Aghlabid emir Ziyadat Allah I.

==== South Asia ====
- About 830 an Arabian dhow sinks on its journey from China to Arabia near the Indonesian island of Belitung, carrying some 60,000 trade items, the largest collection of Tang dynasty artifacts outside of China (Belitung shipwreck).

=== By topic ===
==== Religion ====
- Nennius, Welsh abbot of Bangor Fawr, compiles the Historia Brittonum. He is also known for the Historia's list of the 12 battles of King Arthur (approximate date).
- Hirsau Abbey (modern Germany) is founded by the Rhenish Franconian count Erlafried of Calw (approximate date).
- Ansgar, a Frankish missionary, visits the trade city Birka, located at Lake Mälaren in Sweden (approximate date).

== Births ==
- Adalard, Frankish nobleman (approximate date)
- Athanasius I, bishop of Naples (d. 872)
- Carloman of Bavaria, Frankish king (or 828)
- Charles, Frankish bishop (or 825)
- Engelberga, Frankish empress (approximate date)
- Irmgard, Frankish abbess (or 833)
- Ishaq ibn Hunayn, Muslim physician (approximate date)
- Junayd of Baghdad, Muslim Sufi (d. 910)
- Kōkō, emperor of Japan (d. 887)
- Lambert III, Frankish nobleman (d. 882)
- Naum of Preslav, Bulgarian writer (approximate date)
- Robert the Strong, Frankish nobleman (approximate date)
- Rimbert, Frankish archbishop (d. 888)
- Rurik, prince of Novgorod (approximate date)
- Wulgrin I, Frankish count (approximate date)
- Yahya ibn Mu'adh al-Razi, Muslim Sufi (d. 871)
- Yunju Daoying, Chinese Buddhist teacher (d. 902)

== Deaths ==
- Æthelwold, bishop of Lichfield
- Ashot I, prince of Iberia (or 826)
- Eardwulf, king of Northumbria (approximate date)
- Egfrid, bishop of Lindisfarne
- Li Jiang, chancellor of the Tang Dynasty (b. 764)
- Sa'id ibn Aws al-Ansari, Muslim linguist
- Wang Jian, Chinese poet (approximate date)
- Zhang Ji, Chinese scholar and poet (approximate date)
