= 809 =

Calendar year

809 in various calendars
- Gregorian calendar: 809; DCCCIX
- Ab urbe condita: 1562
- Armenian calendar: 258; ԹՎ ՄԾԸ
- Assyrian calendar: 5559
- Balinese saka calendar: 730–731
- Bengali calendar: 215–216
- Berber calendar: 1759
- Buddhist calendar: 1353
- Burmese calendar: 171
- Byzantine calendar: 6317–6318
- Chinese calendar: 戊子年 (Earth Rat); 3506 or 3299 — to — 己丑年 (Earth Ox); 3507 or 3300
- Coptic calendar: 525–526
- Discordian calendar: 1975
- Ethiopian calendar: 801–802
- Hebrew calendar: 4569–4570
- Hindu calendars
- Vikram Samvat: 865–866
- Shaka Samvat: 730–731
- Kali Yuga: 3909–3910
- Holocene calendar: 10809
- Iranian calendar: 187–188
- Islamic calendar: 193–194
- Japanese calendar: Daidō 4 (大同４年)
- Javanese calendar: 705–706
- Julian calendar: 809; DCCCIX
- Korean calendar: 3142
- Minguo calendar: 1103 before ROC 民前1103年
- Nanakshahi calendar: −659
- Seleucid era: 1120/1121 AG
- Thai solar calendar: 1351–1352
- Tibetan calendar: ས་ཕོ་བྱི་བ་ལོ་ (male Earth-Rat); 935 or 554 or −218 — to — ས་མོ་གླང་ལོ་ (female Earth-Ox); 936 or 555 or −217

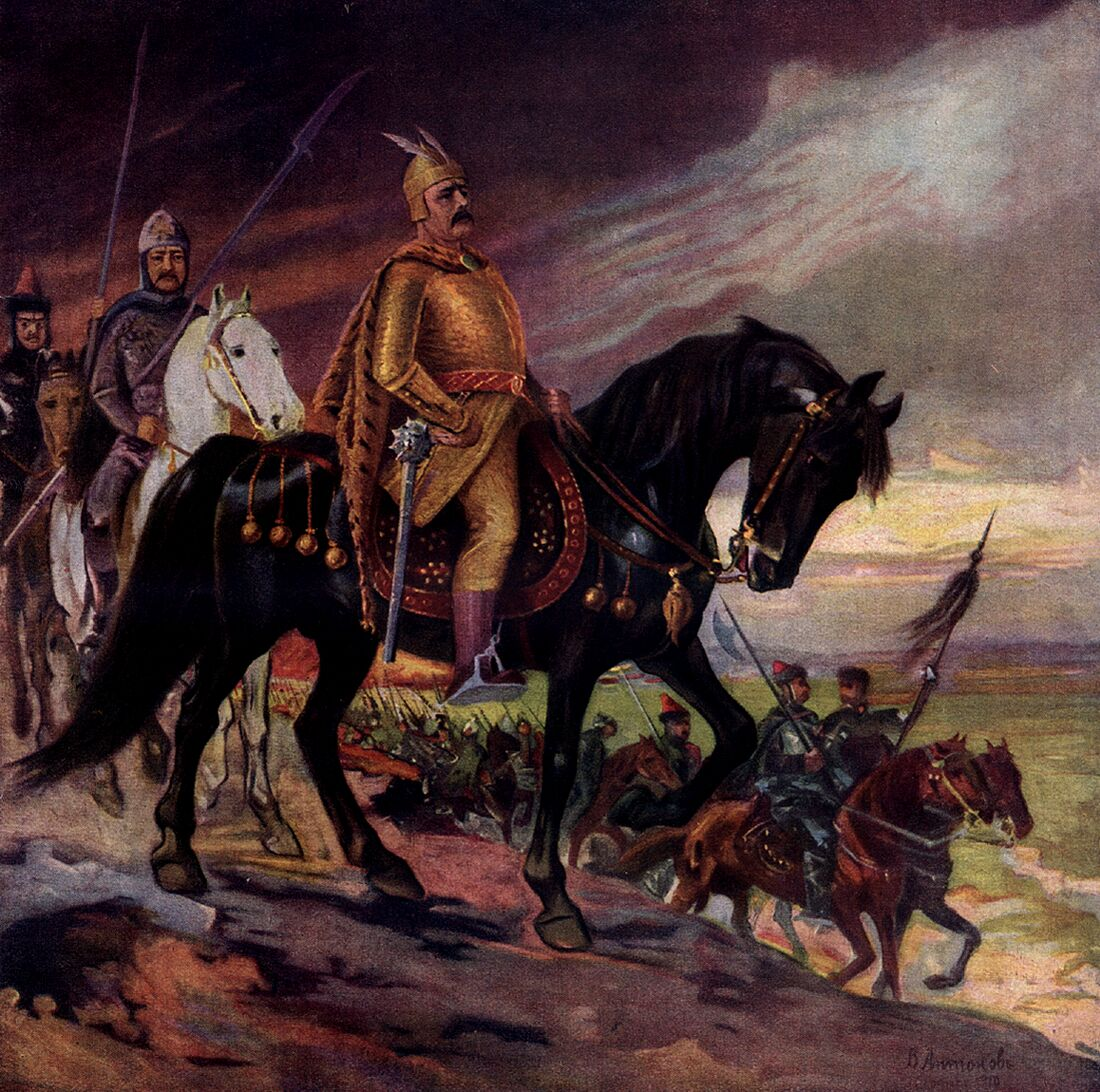
The Bulgars led by Krum conquer Serdica

Year 809 (DCCCIX) was a common year starting on Monday of the Julian calendar, the 809th year of the Common Era (CE) and Anno Domini (AD) designations, the 809th year of the 1st millennium, the 9th year of the 9th century, and the 10th and last year of the 800s decade.

== Events ==
=== By place ===
==== Byzantine Empire ====
- Spring – Siege of Serdica: Krum, ruler (khan) of the Bulgarian Empire, captures the fortress of Serdica (modern Sofia), after a long siege. According to Byzantine sources, he massacres the garrison (supposedly 6,000 men), sacks the city, and razes the city walls, before returning with much loot to Bulgaria. In the following years (and centuries), Serdica will serve as a base for the expansion of the Bulgars to the south of the Balkans.

==== Europe ====
- A Byzantine fleet lands in the Venetian Lagoon, and attacks a Frankish flotilla at Comacchio, but is defeated. Doge Obelerio degli Antenori marries a Frankish bride, Carola; she becomes the first dogaressa of Venice.
- Aznar Galíndez I succeeds Aureolus, as count of Aragon (modern Spain). He is installed by King Louis the Pious (a son of emperor Charlemagne), and remains a Frankish vassal.
- A rebellion in Gharb al-Andalus (modern Portugal) is crushed by the Emirate of Córdoba.

==== Abbasid Caliphate ====
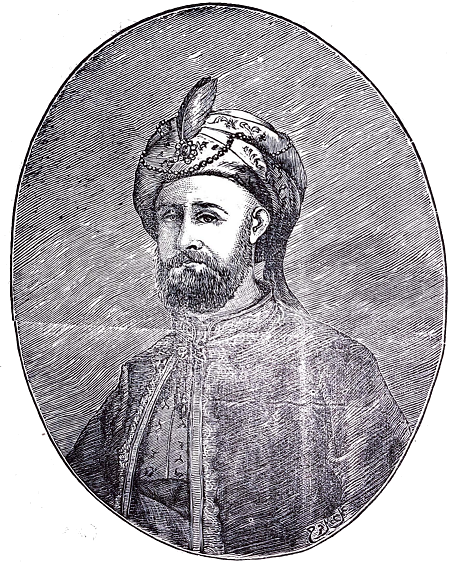
Caliph Harun al-Rashid of the Abbasid dynasty

- March 24 – Caliph Harun al-Rashid dies at Tus, on an expedition to put down an uprising in Khorasan (modern Iran). He is succeeded by his son Muhammad ibn Harun al-Amin.

==== Asia ====
- Emperor Heizei becomes ill, and abdicates the throne in favor of his brother Saga, who is installed as the 52nd emperor of Japan.
- Emperor Govinda III defeats his rival Nagabhata II, and obtains the submission of the Pala Empire (India).

=== By topic ===
==== Religion ====
- Council of Aachen (809): Frankish bishops adopt the filioque addition in the Creed. Pope Leo III intervenes, and refuses to recognize it as valid.

== Births ==
- Hunayn ibn Ishaq, Muslim scholar and physician (d. 873)
- Jing Zong, emperor of the Tang Dynasty (d. 827)
- Wen Zong, emperor of the Tang Dynasty (d. 840)

== Deaths ==
- March 24 – Harun al-Rashid, Muslim caliph (b. 763)
- March 26 – Ludger, Frisian missionary
- July 14 – Ōtomo no Otomaro, Japanese general and Shōgun (b. 731)
- Abbas ibn al-Ahnaf, Muslim poet (b. 750)
- Aejang, king of Silla (b. 788)
- Aureolus of Aragon, Frankish nobleman
- Cellach Tosach mac Donngaile, Irish king
- Elfodd, Welsh bishop (approximate date)
- Gang, king of Balhae (Korea)
- Wang Shizhen, Chinese general (b. 759)
