= Kaldi =

Legendary Ethiopian goatherd credited with discovering coffee

Kaldi was the name of a legendary goatherd who is credited with discovering coffee in 850 CE, according to popular legend, after which such crop entered the Islamic world and then the rest of the world.

== Story ==
Kaldi is described as being an Ethiopian or Arab goatherd. In the 9th century, a goat herder named Kaldi noticed that when his goats were nibbling on the bright red berries of a certain bush, they became very energetic. Kaldi then chewed on the fruit himself. His exhilaration prompted him to bring the berries to the nearest place of worship in the village. After a brief explanation, the head monk of an Islamic monastery deemed the berries to be the devil's work, and abruptly threw the berries into a nearby fire. Soon thereafter, a sensual and powerful aroma filled the room that could not be overlooked. The head monk, who had thrown them in the fire in the first place, ordered the embers be pulled from the fire and for hot water to be poured over them to preserve the smell. Upon drinking the mixture, they experienced the peaceful, warming, and calming sensation it gave them. The after-effects were just as powerful, as they were able to stay alert and discuss important matters for longer periods of time. The monk then shared his discovery with the other monks at the monastery, and knowledge of the energizing berries began to spread.

=== Name ===
The herder is unnamed in the earliest account. The name Kaldi appears to be a later invention from the 20th century, propagated by William H. Ukers.

=== Analysis ===
The story is probably apocryphal, as it was first related by Antoine Faustus Nairon, a Maronite Roman professor of Oriental languages and author of one of the first printed treatises devoted to coffee, De Saluberrima potione Cahue seu Cafe nuncupata Discurscus (Rome, 1671), which describes a camel or goat herder in the Kingdom of Ayaman, Arabia Felix.

According to The World of Caffeine: The Science and Culture of the World's Most Popular Drug: The myth of Kaldi the goatherd and his dancing goats, the coffee origin story most frequently encountered in Western literature, embellishes the credible tradition that the Sufi encounter with coffee occurred in Ethiopia, which lies just across the narrow passage of the Red Sea from Arabia's western coast.

== Influence ==
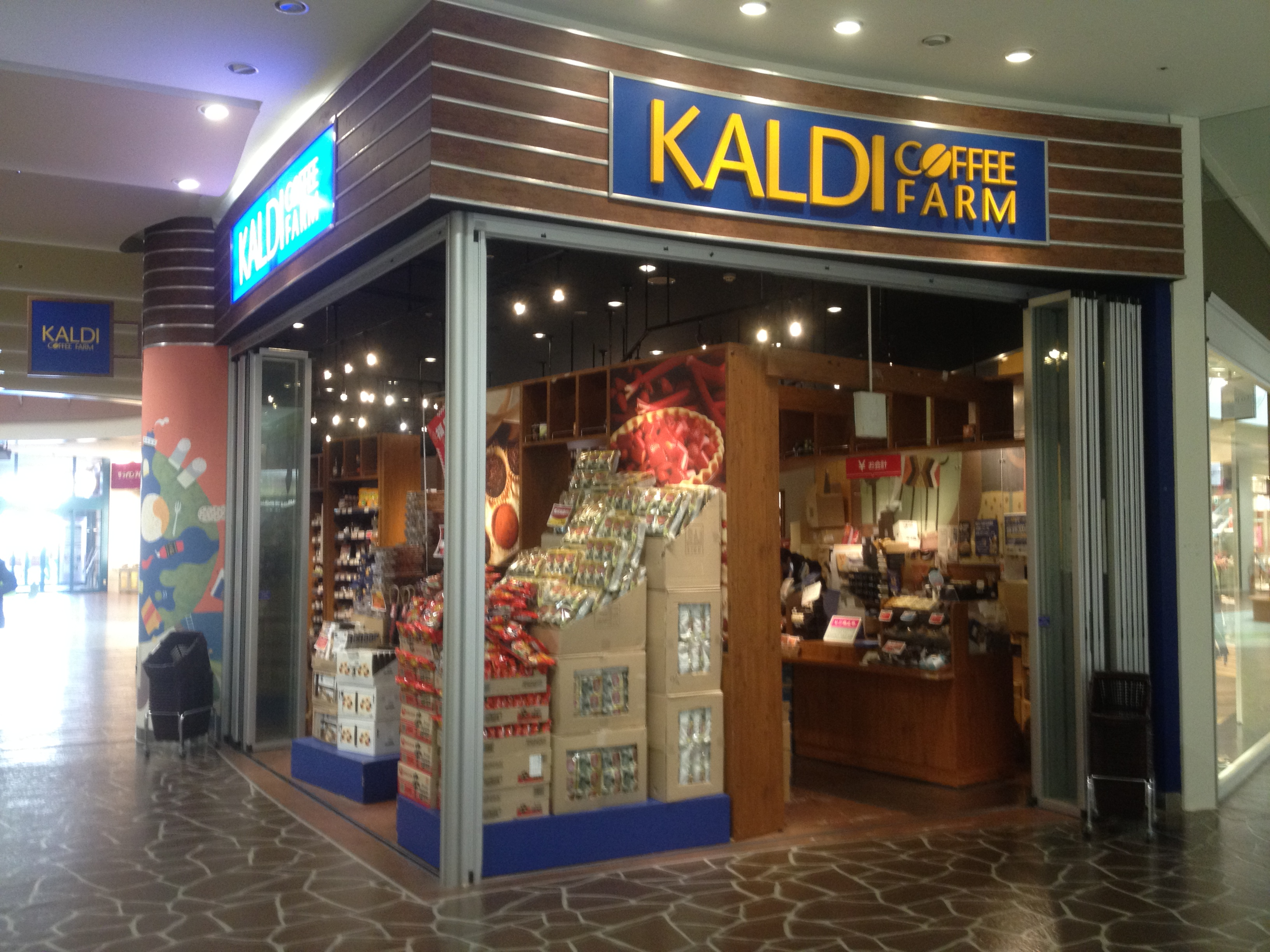
A KALDI Coffee Farm location in Japan

In modern times, Kaldi Coffee, Kaldi's Coffee, Dancing Goat, and Wandering Goat are popular names for coffee shops and coffee roasting companies around the world. The largest coffee chain in Ethiopia is called Kaldi's Coffee.
