= Grimbald =

Grimbald or Grimbaldus may refer to:

- Grimbald of Saint-Bertin (died 901), Frankish monk active in England, saint
- Grimbald (physician) (fl. 1101–1138), Italian physician active in England

== See also ==
- Grimbald Gospels
