= Archbishopric of Salzburg =

Archbishopric of Salzburg may refer to:

- Roman Catholic Archdiocese of Salzburg, the spiritual jurisdiction of the archbishops of Salzburg since c. 700
- Prince-Archbishopric of Salzburg, the secular jurisdiction of the archbishops of Salzburg between 1328 and 1803
