= 761 =

Calendar year

761 in various calendars
Gregorian calendar	761; DCCLXI
Ab urbe condita	1514
Armenian calendar	210; ԹՎ ՄԺ
Assyrian calendar	5511
Balinese saka calendar	682–683
Bengali calendar	167–168
Berber calendar	1711
Buddhist calendar	1305
Burmese calendar	123
Byzantine calendar	6269–6270
Chinese calendar	庚子年 (Metal Rat); 3458 or 3251 — to — 辛丑年 (Metal Ox); 3459 or 3252
Coptic calendar	477–478
Discordian calendar	1927
Ethiopian calendar	753–754
Hebrew calendar	4521–4522
- Hindu calendars
Vikram Samvat	817–818
Shaka Samvat	682–683
Kali Yuga	3861–3862
Holocene calendar	10761
Iranian calendar	139–140
Islamic calendar	143–144
Japanese calendar	Tenpyō-hōji 5 (天平宝字５年)
Javanese calendar	655–656
Julian calendar	761; DCCLXI
Korean calendar	3094
Minguo calendar	1151 before ROC 民前1151年
Nanakshahi calendar	−707
Seleucid era	1072/1073 AG
Thai solar calendar	1303–1304
Tibetan calendar	ལྕགས་ཕོ་བྱི་བ་ལོ་ (male Iron-Rat); 887 or 506 or −266 — to — ལྕགས་མོ་གླང་ལོ་ (female Iron-Ox); 888 or 507 or −265

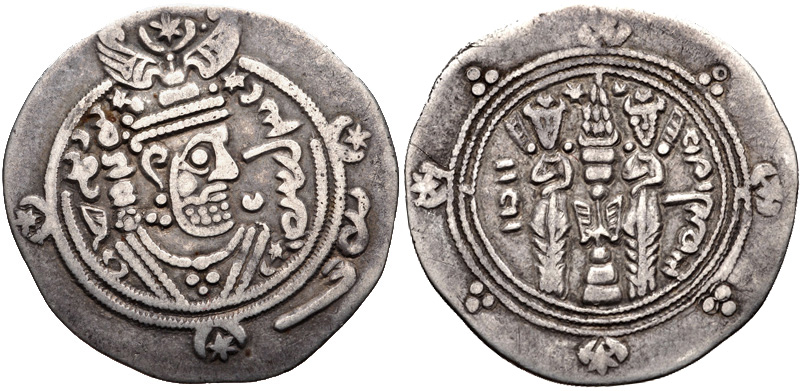
Silver dirham of Khurshid II (734–761)

Year 761 (DCCLXI) was a common year starting on Thursday of the Julian calendar. The denomination 761 for this year has been used since the early medieval period, when the Anno Domini calendar era became the prevalent method in Europe for naming years.

== Events ==
=== By place ===
==== Britain ====
- August 6 – Battle of Eildon: King Æthelwald Moll of Northumbria faces a rebellion, under a rival claimant to the throne named Oswine, brother of the murdered King Oswulf of Northumbria. Oswine is killed after a three-day battle against the forces of Æthelwald in Scotland.
- Bridei V succeeds his brother Óengus I as king of the Picts (modern Scotland).

==== Europe ====
- The city of Oviedo (Northern Spain) is founded by the monks Nolan and John (approximate date).
- Construction is completed on the 108-room Castello di Lunghezza outside of Rome, Italy.

==== Abbasid Caliphate ====
- An Abbasid Caliphate army reconquers the city of Kairouan (in modern-day Tunisia), from 'Abd al-Rahmān ibn Rustam of the Rustamid dynasty. The latter is forced to flee west, where he creates an autonomous state around Tihert (Tiaret).
- Khurshid II, the last ruler (spāhbed) of Tabaristan, poisons himself when he learns that his family has been captured by the Abbasids.

==== Asia ====
- The Japanese priest Dōkyō cures Empress Kōken by using prayers and potions. He may have become her lover and certainly becomes her court favorite, arousing the jealousy of Emperor Junnin.
- A great Chinese famine in the Huai-Yangtze area, late in the year, drives many people to cannibalism (approximate date).

== Births ==
- Shun Zong, emperor of the Tang dynasty (d. 806)
- Wu Chongyin, general of the Tang dynasty (d. 827)

== Deaths ==
- December 23 – Gaubald, bishop of Regensburg
- Donngal mac Laidcnén, king of the Uí Ceinnselaig (Ireland)
- Ibn Ishaq, Arab historian and hagiographer (or 767)
- Khurshid II, ruler (spāhbed) of Tabaristan (b. 734)
- Óengus I, king of the Picts
- Shi Siming, general of the Tang dynasty (b. 703)
- Empress Xin of China (b. unknown date)
