= Huainan Circuit =

- Chinese: 淮南道 or 淮南路
Transcriptions
Standard Mandarin
- Hanyu Pinyin: Huáinán Dào / Huáinán Lù

Huainan Circuit or Huainan Province was one of the major circuits during the Tang dynasty, Five Dynasties period, and early Song dynasty. Huainan was also the name of Wu, whose territorial claims was nearly identical to the circuit. In 1072 during the Song dynasty it was divided into 2 circuits: Huainan East Circuit and Huainan West Circuit.

Its administrative area, between the Huai River and Yangtze, corresponds to roughly the modern provinces of northern Jiangsu, northern Anhui, southern Henan and northern Hubei, with a tiny part of Jiangxi.

== Song dynasty ==
The circuit administered roughly 22 prefectures (including 1 superior prefecture and 4 military prefectures) and 71 counties.
