= Li Yi (poet) =

Tang dynasty poet

Li Yi (Chinese: 李益; pinyin: Lǐ Yì; Wade–Giles: Li I, about 746/748–827/829) was a poet of the Tang dynasty.

Three of Li Yi's poems were collected in the popular anthology Three Hundred Tang Poems. However, one of his most famous poems and one which was included in most other Classical Chinese poetry anthologies was not included in the Tang 300, namely the one translated by Herbert Giles as "A cast-off favourite", written in the persona of a palace lady.

== Biography ==
Li Yi was born in either 746 or 748. (Note: Sources differ on the year he was born. Ueki et al. (1999, p. 117), Jinling Library and Shenzhen Special Zone Daily (2008) give 748, while Gansu China Network (2010) gives 746.)

In 769 he passed the imperial examination, receiving his Jinshi degree.

He died in either 827 or 829. (Note: Sources differ on the year of his death. Ueki et al. (1999, p. 117) give "829?", Jinling Library and Gansu China Network (2010) give 829, while Shenzhen Special Zone Daily (2008) gives 827.)

== Works cited ==
- Maruyama, Shigeru (1994). "Li Yi (Ri Eki in Japanese)". Encyclopedia Nipponica (in Japanese). Shogakukan.
- Ueki, Hisayuki; Uno, Naoto; Matsubara, Akira (1999). "Shijin to Shi no Shōgai (Ri Eki)". In Matsuura, Tomohisa (ed.). Kanshi no Jiten 漢詩の事典 (in Japanese). Tokyo: Taishūkan Shoten. pp. 117–118. OCLC 41025662.
- "Li Yi" (in Chinese). Jinling Library. Archived from the original on August 3, 2012.
- "Dali Ten Talents and Li Yi" (in Chinese). Shenzhen Special Zone Daily. May 27, 2008. Archived from the original on November 26, 2010.
- "Tang Poet Li Yi" (in Chinese). Gansu China Network. June 29, 2010.
