= Tosŏn =

Korean Buddhist monk

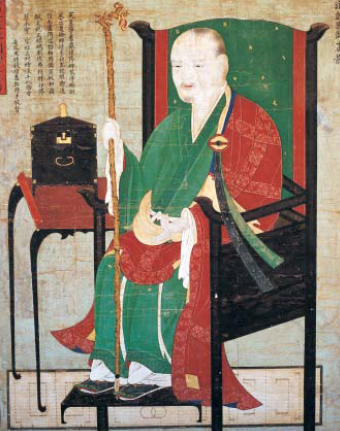
- Portrait of Tosŏn Guksa in Seonamsa Temple

Korean name
- Hangul: 도선 국사
- Hanja: 道詵 國師
- RR: Doseon guksa
- MR: Tosŏn kuksa

Tosŏn Kuksa (Korean: 도선 국사; Hanja: 道詵 國師; 826-898), also known as Yogong Sŏnsa, Yŏn'gi Tosŏn, was a Korean Buddhist monk who lived during the decline of the Silla Dynasty, just prior to the foundation of the Goryeo Dynasty. At least 70 temples, monasteries and hermitages are claimed to have been founded either under Tosŏn's supervision and direction, or by orders of Taejo of Goryeo following Tosŏn's recommendations.

Tosŏn Kuksa is one of the Silla Dynasty's most well-known and oft-cited figures, remaining extremely influential throughout the remainder of Korean history up to the present.

== Childhood ==
Tosŏn Kuksa came from the Gurim Village in Gunseomyeon District of Yeongam County, South Jeolla Province, on the western slopes of Wolchulsan. Although Tosŏn's family name was Kim, records indicate there was a rumor that Tosŏn was a descendant of the Silla Dynasty's Great King Taejong Muyeol. Legend has it Tosŏn's mother had a conception-dream where she swallowed a beautiful pearl (a symbol of pure wisdom), and during her first month of pregnancy chanted Buddhist scriptures, all the time abstaining from meat, onions and garlic.

From infancy on, Tosŏn was considered a Buddhist prodigy, learning the chants of basic Sutras soon after he could talk.

Tosŏn spent part of his childhood, around 835, at Munsuam (Bodhisattva of Wisdom Hermitage).

In 841, at the age of 15, Tosŏn left Yeongam to become a monk and was accepted to study in Hwaeomsa in Gurye County. Within a month Tosŏn attained "the ineffable wisdom of Munsubosal and the mystic gate of Bohyeonbosal, penetrating the Great Meaning of the Hwaeomgyeong Sutra". Tosŏn was awarded the name "Yeongi", which was the name of the master-monk who founded Hwaeomsa in 544.

== Early adult life ==
In 846, at the age of 20, Tosŏn became recognized as a highly respected Daoist master. He began studying Seon under the great Master and Sect Founder Hyecheol Jeoginseonsa at Dongnisan Taeansa Monastery.

=== Travels ===
By 850 Tosŏn had received the Gujokgye Certification at Cheondosa and was an active practitioner of asceticism, spending most of the year in a cave of Unbongsan with occasional summers in a grotto on Taebaeksan. He journeyed to Tang China for further study, focusing on esoteric Daoist and Buddhist astronomical, astrological, mathematical, geomantic (Feng Shui), cosmological, and I Ching (Juyeokgyeong) teachings.

Upon returning to Korea, Tosŏn ventured throughout the Korean Peninsula, noting the geography, and searching for the source of its unique energies. Ending his travels, Tosŏn built a small hut to rest and meditate in on "Bowl Hill" in western Jirisan where, legend says, a sansin (mountain god) appeared to Tosŏn and offered the "deepest secrets of pungsujiri" as another "method by which great Bodhisattvas grant salvation to humankind". The Korean pungsu system combines indigenous Korean beliefs and Chinese feng shui.

== Later adult life ==
Tosŏn founded, constructed, and settled in at Okryongsa Temple in Okryong-myeon, Gwangyang, where he taught for 35 years. King Heongang proclaimed Tosŏn Silla's leading master-monk because of his reputed wisdom and insight.

Tosŏn studied the various Chinese Daoist schools of feng shui and adapted those ideas and principles into the Korean landscape and cultural environment. The "Bibo-pungsu-jiri" system that he established focuses on "harmony with nature", placing greater emphasis on the spiritual and material energies of mountains and their ranges and the resultant effects on communities and the nation as a whole, rather than on personal fortunes and interior furniture placement. Tosŏn is remembered for his adaptation of Chinese feng shui into Korea's significantly different land and climate conditions while taking a larger and more holistic view of the impacts of natural energies on the country, thus creating Korea's own unique form, "Pungsu-jiri-seol".

Tosŏn is also considered to have developed the concept of the Baekdu-daegan, the earth-energy "spine" of the Korean Peninsula, by making many accurate predictions of future changes to the courses of events for individuals and the Kingdom. Tosŏn is consequently regarded as a kind of founder or patron spirit of modern Korean fortunetelling.

== Influences ==
Tosŏn derives much of his renown as the most influential adviser to Wang Geon, who would become Goryeo's King Taejo. In 875, when passing by an aristocratic mansion under construction at Songaksan, Tosŏn recognized the auspiciousness of the site. He told the young owner that in two years his wife would give birth to a son who would grow to be a great man, leading Korea into a new age. Tosŏn gave the man a document (believed to be the Tosŏn-bigi) in a sealed envelope telling the young owner to keep it safe and a secret, only giving it to the child upon reaching adulthood. The young owner complied, and the boy, born as prophesied, followed the advice within that document to become the founding King of the new Goryeo Dynasty.

Tosŏn left behind advice and concepts, especially in the Tosŏn-bigi, that were significant in choosing the placement of the capital and other important cities and fortresses within the country, and in constructing many new grand Buddhist temples at geomagnetically auspicious sites.

== Final years ==
Records indicate that Tosŏn died in 898 while sitting in the lotus position in front of his many disciples at Baekunsan Okryongsa. Following the death of Tosŏn, King Hyogong conferred the posthumous title of Yogong Seonsa (Essential Emptiness Meditation Master) upon him. His students erected a pagoda called Jingseonghyedeungtap in his honor at Okryongsa, but this pagoda no longer exists.

== Accolades ==
Goryeo's King Sukjong posthumously promoted Tosŏn to the rank of Wangsa (Royal Preceptor/Teacher of the King). King Injong further promoted Tosŏn to the highest possible rank, Kuksa (National Master), with the name/title Seongak Kuksa and common usage title Tosŏn Kuksa (Tao Abundance National Master).

King Uijong erected a monument to Tosŏn in Goryeo's capital city of Gaeseong, according to records.
