= Maura of Troyes =

French Roman Catholic saint

Saint Maura of Troyes

Virgin
- Born: 827; Troyes, Francia
- Died: 21 September 850 (aged 23); West Francia
- Honored in: Anglican Communion; Catholic Church; Eastern Orthodox Church
- Major shrine: Troyes, France
- Feast: 21 September

Maura of Troyes was a French virgin and Christian saint. Born into nobility in Troyes, she devoted herself to prayer, remaining chaste, and is credited with at least two miracles.

== Biography ==
Maura was born to a noble family in Troyes, Francia, in 827, and from a young age devoted herself to prayer. As a young girl, she converted her father Mauranus who had previously lived a worldly life, to Christianity. After his death, Maura continued to live at home, praying, serving the poor, and caring for her mother, who was named either Seluca or Sedulia. Her example was also credited with her brother Eutropius' strong faith, and he later went on to become bishop of Troyes.

When not praying or serving the poor, Maura greatly enjoyed meeting the material needs of local priests and the Troyes Cathedral: she would make sacred vestments, trim the candles, fill oil lamps and prepare wax and other things for the altar. In fact, Bishop Prudentius of Troyes, a personal friend, wore an alb spun and woven by her.

Maura spent every morning in church, praying. She fasted Wednesday and Friday, sustaining herself only on small amounts of bread and water. Sometimes, she would walk several miles to visit her spiritual director at his monastery. She was known to produce copious amounts of tears while praying, considered a gift from God. She was also said to have performed miracles, but asked the people she helped not to make her gifts known.

She died on 21 September 850, at the age of 23. She was buried in the cemetery of Château-Nore-de-Troyes.

== Miracles and sainthood ==
At least three posthumous miracles are attributed to Maura of Troyes. After her death, her body was washed with water, but the water was claimed to have changed into milk. A young man was believed to have been cured of "a burning fever" after drinking the milk. A young woman, whose husband disliked a large birthmark on her cheek, also drank the milk and the birthmark disappeared. She was declared a saint by the community, as was the normal process before the establishment of the Congregation for the Causes of Saints.

St. Maura of Troyes is honored in the Anglican Communion, Catholic Church, and Eastern Orthodox Church. Her feast day is celebrated on 21 September.

== See also ==
- Chronological list of saints in the 9th century
