= Euphemius (Sicily) =

Byzantine admiral

Euphemius or Euphemios (Greek: Εὐφήμιος) was a Byzantine commander in Sicily, who rebelled against the imperial governor in 826 AD, and invited the Aghlabids to aid him, thus beginning the Muslim conquest of Sicily.

== Rebellion in Sicily ==
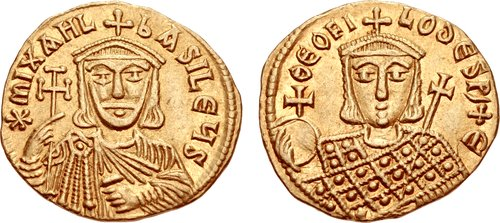
Gold solidus showing Emperor Michael II and his son Theophilos

Euphemius was a Byzantine military commander. In 826, he was a tourmarches and was appointed by the new governor of the theme of Sicily, the patrikios Constantine Soudas, as head of the provincial fleet. According to the Arab historian Ibn al-Athir, Euphemius raided Ifriqiya, seized a number of merchant vessels before they could enter safe ports and devastated the coasts. While he was away the Emperor Michael II the Amorian sent a letter ordering his demotion and punishment. Euphemius learned of this while returning to Sicily with his fleet. Euphemius, supported by the fleet, revolted. He was proclaimed emperor and sailed for the capital of Sicily, Syracuse, which was quickly captured. The patrikios Constantine was either absent from the city or fled inland at his approach but soon gathered an army and attacked him. Euphemius won and forced the governor to seek refuge in Catana. When Euphemius sent his forces against Catana, Constantine tried to flee again but was captured and executed.

The background of these events is unclear. According to Theophanes Continuatus, Euphemius had abducted the nun Homoniza from her monastery and taken her as his wife. Her brothers protested to the Emperor, who ordered the island's governor to investigate the matter and if the charges were found true, to cut off Euphemius' nose as punishment. The Chronicon Salernitanum reports a different variant of the story, whereby Euphemius was betrothed to Homoniza but the governor of Sicily gave her as wife to another, who had bribed the governor. This led Euphemius to swear revenge against the governor. Several historians have cast doubt on these "romantic" stories of the origin of Euphemius' revolt. Theophanes also reports that he rebelled along with "some of his fellow tourmarchai", indicating a wider dissatisfaction among the provincial commanders. As Alexander Vasiliev remarked, Sicily had already shown tendencies against the imperial government before, such as the revolts of Basil Onomagoulos in 718 and Elpidius in 781–2. According to Vasiliev, the ambitious commander simply used an opportune moment, when the Byzantine government was weakened by the recent rebellion of Thomas the Slav and by its preoccupation with the contemporary Muslim conquest of Crete, to seize power. The German historian Ekkehard Eickhoff speculated that Euphemius may have been considered unreliable by the imperial government and that his raid against Ifriqiya—the first such operation attested by the Byzantine fleet—was on Euphemius' initiative, indicating his impetuous character and it may have been the reason he was ordered arrested by the Emperor, who preferred to maintain a passive stance in the West. In traditional historiography, Euphemius is regarded as a champion of Sicilian autonomy against Constantinople rather than an imperial usurper but in a recently published seal of office, he calls himself "Emperor of the Romans", thus clearly indicating his imperial ambitions.

Whatever the true reason for his uprising, soon after his victory over Constantine, Euphemius was deserted by a close ally, a man known through Arab sources as "Balata" (according to Vasiliev probably a corruption of his title, while Treadgold holds that he was named Plato and was possibly an Armenian). Balata was apparently entrusted with extending Euphemius' rule over western Sicily, and particularly Palermo, where his cousin Michael was governor. The two men denounced Euphemius' usurpation of the imperial title and marched against Syracuse, defeated Euphemius and took the city.

== Aghlabid alliance, return to Sicily and death ==
Topographic map of Sicily

Like Elpidius in the 780s, Euphemius resolved to seek refuge among the Empire's enemies and with a few supporters sailed to Ifriqiya. There he sent a delegation to the Aghlabid court, which pleaded with the Aghlabid emir Ziyadat Allah for an army to help Euphemius conquer Sicily, after which he would pay the Aghlabids an annual tribute. This offer presented a great opportunity for the Aghlabids. Ziyadat Allah had just suppressed a dangerous three-year revolt of the Arab ruling elite but his rule was plagued by long-simmering ethnic tensions between Arab settlers and Berbers and criticism by the jurists of the Malikite school for the Aghlabids' preoccupation with worldly concerns, their "un-Islamic" system of taxation and their luxurious lifestyle. An invasion of Sicily promised to divert the energies of their restless soldiers to more profitable ventures, as well as gaining for the regime the prestige of waging jihad against the infidels. Ziyadat Allah's council was divided over the issue but was swayed by the respected qadi of Kairouan, Asad ibn al-Furat, who was placed at the head of the expeditionary force. The Muslim army is said to have consisted of ten thousand foot soldiers and seven hundred cavalry, mostly Ifriqiyan Arabs and Berbers but possibly also some Khurasanis. The fleet comprised seventy or a hundred ships, to which were added Euphemius' vessels.

On 14 June 827, the allied fleets sailed from the Bay of Sousse and after three days reached Mazara in south-western Sicily, where they landed. There they were met with soldiers loyal to Euphemius but the alliance soon began to fray: a Muslim detachment mistook some of Euphemius' partisans for loyalist troops and a skirmish ensued. Although Euphemius' troops were ordered to place a twig on their helmets as a distinctive mark, Asad announced his intention to wage the campaign without them. It is clear that Euphemius had already lost control of the campaign to Asad and that the invasion army, which in any case was overwhelmingly Muslim, served purposes other than his own. Soon after that, Balata, who seems to have taken over the functions, if not the title, of the imperial governor on the island, appeared nearby. The Muslims defeated Balata, who retreated first to Enna and from there to Calabria on the Italian mainland, where he may have hoped to gather more troops. Instead, he died there shortly after his arrival. Michael remained in charge of Palermo but elsewhere on the island, resistance appears to have been minimal. Asad turned towards Syracuse but halted the advance after an embassy from the city offered to pay tribute to the Muslims. At this time, Euphemius began to regret his alliance with the Aghlabids and opened secret contacts with the imperials, urging them to resist the Arabs. Having gained time to prepare their defences, the inhabitants of Syracuse refused to pay the remainder of the tribute and the Muslims began the Siege of Syracuse. The siege lasted until spring 828, when an outbreak of disease killed Asad and the arrival of a Byzantine fleet forced the Muslims to abandon the enterprise. The Arabs even tried to sail back to Ifriqiya but were hindered by the Byzantine ships. Thwarted, the Muslim army burned its ships and retreated over land to the castle of Mineo, which they captured.

After Mineo surrendered, the Muslim army divided, one part took Agrigento in the west, while the other, along with Euphemius, attacked Enna. The garrison of Enna began negotiations, offering to acknowledge Euphemius' authority if he would keep the Muslims away. Confident of success, Euphemius with a small escort went to meet with two brothers who were designated as emissaries and he was stabbed to death. It is unknown what happened to Euphemius' supporters after his death, whether they dispersed or continued fighting alongside the Muslims.

== Portrayals ==
Euphemius' story inspired Silvio Pellico's tragedy Eufemio da Messina (1830), the 1833 opera Irene, ossia l'assedio di Messina, by Giovanni Pacini, and an 1853 opera by Carlo Andrea Gambini.

The character Euphemius played by Albano Jerónimo in the 5th season of the television series Vikings is loosely based on Euphemius.

== Sources ==
- Abun-Nasr, Jamil M. (1987). A History of the Maghrib in the Islamic Period. Cambridge University Press. ISBN 0-521-33767-4.
- Eickhoff, Ekkehard (1966). Seekrieg und Seepolitik zwischen Islam und Abendland: das Mittelmeer unter byzantinischer und arabischer Hegemonie (650-1040) (in German). De Gruyter.
- Lilie, Ralph-Johannes; Ludwig, Claudia; Pratsch, Thomas; Zielke, Beate (2013). Prosopographie der mittelbyzantinischen Zeit Online. Berlin-Brandenburgische Akademie der Wissenschaften. Nach Vorarbeiten F. Winkelmanns erstellt (in German). Berlin and Boston: De Gruyter.
- Metcalfe, Alex (2009). The Muslims of Μedieval Italy. Edinburgh: Edinburgh University Press. ISBN 978-0-7486-2008-1.
- Prigent, Vivien (2006). "La carrière du tourmarque Euphèmios, basileus des Romains". In Jacob, André; Martin, Jean-Marie; Noyé, Ghislaine (eds.). Histoire et culture dans l'Italie byzantine: acquis et nouvelles recherches (in French). Rome: École française de Rome. pp. 279–317. ISBN 2-7283-0741-5.
- Prigent, Vivien (2006). "Pour en finir avec Euphèmios, basileus des Romains". Mélanges de l'École française de Rome: Moyen Âge (in French). 118 (2): 375–380. doi:10.3406/mefr.2006.9422.
- Treadgold, Warren (1988). The Byzantine Revival, 780–842. Stanford, California: Stanford University Press. ISBN 978-0-8047-1462-4.
- Vasiliev, A. A. (1935). Byzance et les Arabes, Tome I: La Dynastie d'Amorium (820–867) (in French). French ed.: Henri Grégoire, Marius Canard. Brussels: Éditions de l'Institut de Philologie et d'Histoire Orientales.
