= Siege of Syracuse (827–828) =

Battle Between Arabs and Byzantium

- Part of the Muslim conquest of Sicily (Arab–Byzantine wars)
| Date | Fall 827 – Summer/Fall 828 |
| Location | Syracuse, Sicily 37°5′N 15°17′E |
| Result | Byzantine victory |

Belligerents
| Byzantine Empire | Aghlabids |

Commanders and leaders
| Unknown | Asad ibn al-Furat # Muhammad ibn Abi'l-Jawari |

Strength
| Unknown | 8,000–9,000 men (Vasiliev) |
- Location within Sicily Siege of Syracuse (827–828) (Mediterranean)

The siege of Syracuse in 827–828 marks the first attempt by the Aghlabids to conquer the city of Syracuse in Sicily, then a Byzantine province. The Aghlabid army had only months before landed on Sicily, ostensibly in support of the rebel Byzantine general Euphemius. After defeating local forces and taking the fortress of Mazara, they marched on Syracuse, which was the capital of the island under Roman and Byzantine rule. The siege lasted through the winter of 827–828 and until summer, during which time the besieging forces suffered greatly from lack of food and an outbreak of an epidemic, which claimed the life of their commander, Asad ibn al-Furat. In the face of Byzantine reinforcements, the new Arab leader, Muhammad ibn Abi'l-Jawari, abandoned the siege and withdrew to the southwestern part of the island, which remained in their hands. From there they pursued the slow conquest of Sicily, which led to the fall of Syracuse after another long siege in 877–878, and culminated in the fall of Taormina in 902.

== See also ==
- Siege of Syracuse (877–878)

== Sources ==
- Bury, John Bagnell (1912), A History of the Eastern Roman Empire from the Fall of Irene to the Accession of Basil I (A.D. 802–867), London: Macmillan and Co., pp. 294–302
- Treadgold, Warren (1988). The Byzantine Revival, 780–842. Stanford, California: Stanford University Press. pp. 248ff. ISBN 978-0-8047-1462-4.
- Vasiliev, Alexander A. (1935). Byzance et les Arabes, Tome I: La dynastie d'Amorium (820–867). Corpus Bruxellense Historiae Byzantinae (in French). Vol. 1. French ed.: Henri Grégoire, Marius Canard. Brussels: Éditions de l'Institut de philologie et d'histoire orientales. pp. 78–82.
