= Yantou Quanhuo =

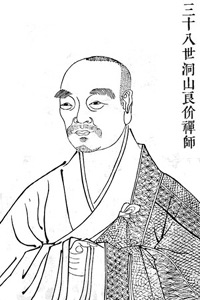
- Title: Ch'an-shih

Personal life
- Born: 828 Quanzhou, China
- Died: 887
- Other name: Ch'an Master Clear Severity

Religious life
- Religion: Zen Buddhism
- School: Ch'an

Senior posting
- Predecessor: Deshan Xuanjin

Yantou Quanhuo (Chinese: 巖頭全豁; pinyin: Yántóu Quánhuō; Japanese Gānto Zenkatsu) (828–887) was an ancient Ch'an master of Yantou Monastery in Ezhou, China. A dharma heir of Deshan Xuanjin, Quanho was born in Quanzhou and became a novice monk at Baoshu Temple in Changan, China. Known to be an avid traveler, Yantou eventually began studying Ch'an under Deshan and received Dharma transmission from him. He then became master of Yantou Monastery, where he led a congregation of students. In 887 on the "eighth day of the fourth month" his temple was raided by bandits. When the bandits realized the temple had nothing of value to take, one of them stabbed Yantou—murdering him. It is said that his scream at death could be heard for ten miles. He was given the title Ch'an Master Clear Severity following his death. Yantou is the subject of several koan cases that appear in the Mumonkan such as case number 13, titled "Tokusan Carries His Bowls".
