= Ali ibn Isa al-Asturlabi =

Arab geographer and astronomer (fl. 832)

Alī ibn ʿĪsā al-Asṭurlābī
- علي بن عيسى
- Born: before 858

Academic work
- Era: Islamic Golden Age
- Main interests: Geography, astronomy

ʿAlī ibn ʿĪsā al-Asṭurlābī (Arabic: علي بن عيسى, fl. 832) was a 9th century Arab geographer and astronomer. He wrote a treatise on the astrolabe and was an opponent of astrology. During the reign of al-Ma'mun, and together with Khālid ibn ʿAbd al-Malik al-Marwarrūdhī, he participated in an expedition to the Plain of Sinjar to measure the length of a degree. Differing reports state that they obtained a result of 56 miles (90 km), 56 and two-thirds, or 56 and one-quarter miles per degree.

== Sources ==
- Bolt, Marvin (2007). "ʿAlī ibn ʿĪsā al-Asṭurlābī". In Hockey, Thomas; et al. (eds.). Biographical Encyclopedia of Astronomers. Springer Publishers.
- Mercier, Raymond (2008). "Geodesy". In Selin, Helaine (ed.). Encyclopaedia of the History of Science, Technology, and Medicine in Non-Western Cultures. Vol. 1 (2nd ed.). Berlin: Springer Nature. ISBN 978-14020-4-559-2.
