= Asad ibn al-Furat =

Arab theologian, Jurist and Military leader

- أسد بن الفرات

Personal life
- Born: c. 759; Harran
- Died: c. 828
- Parent: Furat (father)
- Era: Islamic golden age
- Known for: Islamic Theology, Islamic Jurisprudence and Arab conquest of Sicily
- Occupation: Theologian, Jurist and a Military leader

Religious life
- Religion: Sunni Islam

Asad Ibn Al-Furat (Arabic: أسد بن الفرات; ca. 142/759 – ca. 213/828) was a Muslim jurist and theologian in Ifriqiya, who played an important role in the Arab conquest of Sicily.

== Biography ==
His family belonged to the Banu Tamim tribe, and emigrated from Harran in Upper Mesopotamia to Ifriqiya. Asad studied first in Tunis and then travelled to Medina where he is said to have studied with Malik ibn Anas, the founder of the Malikite school. According to sources, he then travelled to Kufa and studied with a disciple of Abu Hanifa, the founder of the Hanafite tradition. On his way back to Ifriqiya he visited Egypt, where he is said to have compiled the legal work called al-Asadiyya, which had great influence in Ifriqiya.

After his return to Ifriqiya he became a judge in Kairouan, where he soon came into conflict with the Emir Ziyadat Allah I (817-838) after criticising his luxurious and impious lifestyle. In 210/826 Ziyadat Allah appointed Asad to lead a campaign to Byzantine Sicily. In 212/827 Asad landed with a force of Arabs in Sicily and following a defeat of Byzantine troops proceeded to besiege Syracuse. However, the city could not be taken and Asad died of plague during the siege.

Asad's legal orientation tends to be seen as Hanafi but he studied under teachers from the Malikite Madh'hab and often referred to Maliki teaching in his own work.

After Asad Ibn al-Furat's death Malikism became the most popular legal school in Ifriqiya.
