= 770s =

Decade

The 770s decade ran from January 1, 770, to December 31, 779.

== Events ==
=== By place ===
==== Europe ====
- King Charlemagne signs a peace treaty with Duke Tassilo III of Bavaria, and marries the Lombard princess Desiderata (daughter of King Desiderius). He travels to the Lombard court at Pavia to conclude arrangements. Pope Stephen III opposes the marriage, and protests about a Frankish-Lombard alliance.
- Hedeby, an important trading settlement, in the Danish-northern German borderland is founded (approximate date).

==== Britain ====
- King Alhred of Northumbria takes an interest in continental missionary activities, and sends Willehad to Frisia in modern-day Netherlands (approximate date).

==== Abbasid Caliphate ====
- Caliph al-Mansur orders the closing of the Canal of the Pharaohs (Egypt). The only remaining land routes to transship camel caravans' goods are from Alexandria to ports on the Red Sea, or the northern Byzantine termini of the Silk Road.

==== Asia ====
- August 28 – Empress Kōken (also Shōtoku) of Japan dies.

=== By place ===
==== Europe ====
- December 4 – King Carloman I, youngest son of Pepin III ("the Short"), dies (of a severe nosebleed, according to one source) at the Villa of Samoussy, leaving his brother Charlemagne sole ruler of the now reunified Frankish Kingdom. Gerberga, the widow of Carloman, flees with her two sons to the court of King Desiderius of the Lombards, at Pavia.
- Charlemagne repudiates his Lombard wife Desiderata, daughter of Desiderius, after one year of marriage. He marries the 13-year-old Swabian girl Hildegard, who will bear him nine children. Desiderius, furious at Charlemagne, plans a punitive campaign against the Franks and Rome.
- King Offa of Mercia defeats the Haestingas, and joins their little region to his sub-kingdom of Sussex.

==== Americas ====
- January 24 – Kʼakʼ Tiliw Chan Yopaat dedicates a 65-ton stele, the largest stone known to be quarried by the Maya civilization, at his city of Quiriguá.

=== By place ===
==== Europe ====
- Saxon Wars: King Charlemagne leads a Frankish expedition from the Middle Rhine into disputed territory lost by the Franks in 695. He starts a campaign against the Saxons and seizes Eresburg, destroying the Irminsul (Saxon sacred tree) near Paderborn. Charlemagne devastates several major Saxon strongholds, and forces them to retreat beyond the Weser River. After negotiating with some Saxon nobles and obtaining hostages, he installs a number of garrisons.
- King Desiderius of the Lombards, enraged by the repudiation by Charlemagne of his daughter Desiderata, proclaims Gerberga's sons lawful heirs to the Frankish throne. He attacks Pope Adrian I for refusing to crown them, and invades the Duchy of the Pentapolis. Desiderius marches on Rome, and Adrian turns to the Franks for military support.
- In England, King Offa of Mercia attempts to rule Kent directly, possibly to depose his rival Egbert II (approximate date).

==== Asia ====
- Abbasid caliph Al-Mansur completes construction of the garrison city of al-Rāfiqah adjacent to Raqqa.

=== By topic ===
==== Religion ====
- January 24 – Pope Stephen III dies after a 3½-year reign, in which he has approved the acceptable reverence of icons in the Eastern Church. On February 1 he is succeeded by Adrian I (also referred to as Hadrian) as the 95th pope of Rome.

=== By place ===
==== Europe ====
- Summer – King Charlemagne and his uncle Bernard, son of Charles Martel, cross the Alps with a Frankish expeditionary force at the request of Pope Adrian I. At the foot of the mountains in the Susa Valley (Northern Italy), the Franks are hindered by Lombard fortifications. After scouting, Charlemagne attacks the defenders from the flank, and forces the Lombards to flee to the fortified capital Pavia.
- Siege of Pavia: Charlemagne besieges Pavia, which is poorly stocked with food. King Desiderius remains in the capital, and orders his son Adalgis to defend Verona to guard Gerberga, and the children of Carloman I. After a short siege, Adalgis flees to Constantinople, where he is received by Emperor Constantine V. Meanwhile, the Franks capture the cities of Verona and Mortara.
- Saxon Wars: Saxon forces seize upon Charlemagne's preoccupation with Italy to retake Eresburg and Syburg (near Dortmund). They unsuccessfully attack the episcopal centre of Büraburg, which had been established by St. Boniface (see 723).

==== Britain ====
- King Alhred of Northumbria makes overtures of friendship toward Charlemagne (approximate date).

==== Abbasid Caliphate ====
- The number 0 is introduced to the city of Baghdad, which will be developed in the Middle East by Arabian mathematicians, who will base their numbers on the Indian system (long after the Maya culture developed the concept, cf. Maya numerals).

==== Asia ====
- King Khongtekcha of Manipur (modern India) dies after a 10-year reign; during his rule the Meitei language script first appears.

=== By topic ===
==== Ecology ====
- A large and sudden increase in radiocarbon (^{14}C) occurs around 773, in coral skeletons from the South China Sea (see 774-775 carbon-14 spike).

=== By place ===
==== Byzantine Empire ====
- Battle of Berzitia: The Bulgarian ruler (khagan) Telerig sends a small raiding army (12,000 men) to strike into the southwest of Macedonia, and capture Berzitia. Emperor Constantine V is informed about this raid by his spies in Pliska, and assembles an enormous force (80,000 men). He surprises the Bulgarians, who did not expect to find a Byzantine army there, and defeats them decisively. The Bulgars suffer heavy losses.
- Telerig sends a message to Constantine V, stating that he is going to flee in exile to Constantinople. In exchange, he asks the emperor to reveal the spies to his associates in Pliska for their own safety. Constantine sends the Bulgarian government a list of the spies; however, Telerig executes them all, and eliminates the Byzantine spy network within his government.

==== Europe ====
- King Charlemagne conquers the Lombard Kingdom, and establishes Frankish rule in Pavia, Venetia, Istria, Emilia, Tuscany, and Corsica. Charlemagne visits Rome; he confirms the Donation of Pepin (see 756) while insisting on his own sovereignty. Pope Adrian I grants him the title of patrician. Charlemagne puts down immediate insurrections in Friuli.
- June – King Desiderius surrenders the independence of the Lombards to the Franks, and is exiled to Corbie Abbey (Picardy). Charlemagne annexes northern Italy as a sub-kingdom, and takes the title of Rex Langobardorum. Some Lombards flee south to Benevento, which remains independent; Duke Arechis II retitles himself "Prince of Benevento".
- Saxon Wars: Saxon raiders ravage much of northern Hesse (modern Germany), and burn the abbey at Fritzlar, putting the abbot and monks to the sword. Charlemagne hurriedly returns to Austrasia, assembles local troops, and recaptures Eresburg, before the approach of winter halts further operations.
- King Aurelius dies after a 6-year reign, and is succeeded by his cousin-in-law Silo, as ruler of Asturias (Northern Spain).

==== Britain ====
- Unrest in the Northumbrian Church appears to lead to the expulsion of King Alhred, who is driven from his capital York. He sails from Bamburgh into exile amongst the Picts, where he is received by King Ciniod I. He is replaced by Æthelred I, the 11-year-old son of the late king Æthelwald Moll.
- King Offa of Mercia subdues the Anglo-Saxon kingdoms of Kent and Wessex (approximate date).

=== By topic ===
==== Astronomy ====
- A 1.2% growth of ^{14}C concentration recorded in tree rings, along with corresponding spikes of ^{36}Cl and ^{10}Be recorded in ice cores, suggests that a very strong solar storm may have hit Earth in either 774 or 775.

=== By place ===
==== Byzantine Empire ====
- September 14 – Emperor Constantine V dies while on a campaign in Bulgaria. In his 34-year reign he has suppressed monasticism and image worship, restored aqueducts, revived commerce, and repopulated Constantinople. He is succeeded by his 25-year-old son Leo IV ("the Khazar"), who continues Constantine's campaigns against the Bulgars and Muslim Arabs.

==== Europe ====
- Saxon Wars: King Charlemagne holds a major assembly at Quierzy (Northern France). He leads a Frankish army into Saxony to retake the castrum of Syburg (near Dortmund), then rebuilds and garrisons fortified Eresburg. He reaches the Weser at a place called Braunsberg, where the Saxons stand for battle, but are defeated when Frankish troops cross the river.
- Westphalian Saxons, probably commanded by Widukind, cross the Weser and fight an inconclusive battle at Hlidbeck (modern-day Lübbecke). Charlemagne claims victory, but perhaps in reality suffers a setback. He reunites his forces and inflicts a real defeat upon the Saxons, seizing considerable booty and taking hostages, though Widukind escapes.
- Autumn – Charlemagne retakes the Hellweg (main corridor) along the Lippe Valley, establishing communications between Austrasia, Hesse and Thuringia. It is used as a trade route under Frankish supervision.
- The German city of Giessen (Hesse) is founded.

==== Africa ====
- Andalusian merchants set up an emporium (trade settlement) on the Maghreb coast at Ténès (modern Algeria). It is early evidence of the revival of the maritime trade in the Western Mediterranean, after the chaos of the early 8th century.

==== Arab Caliphate ====
- April 25 – Battle of Bagrevand: The Abbasids put an end to an Armenian rebellion. Muslim control over Transcaucasia is solidified, while several major Armenian nakharar families, notably the Mamikonian, lose power and flee to the Byzantine Empire.
- Caliph al-Mansur (r. 754–775) dies after a 21-year reign, in which he has made Baghdad the residence of the Abbasid Caliphate. He is succeeded by his son al-Mahdi.

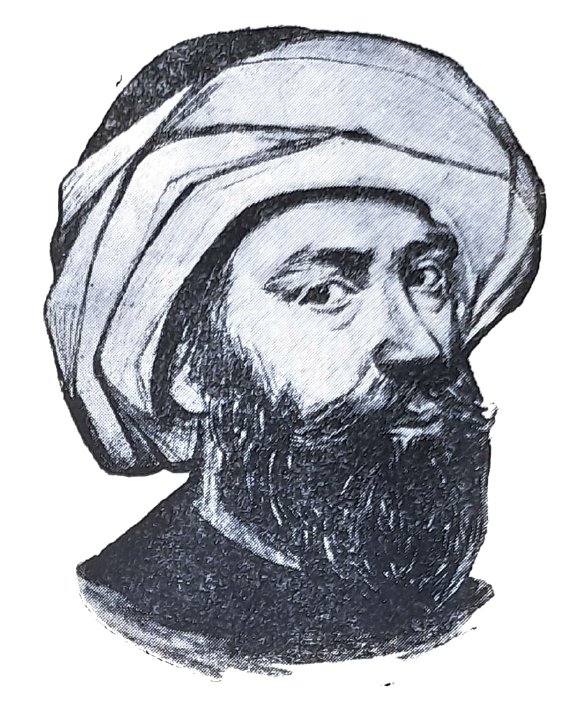
Abbasid caliph al-Mansur was succeeded by his heir and son Al-Mahdi, on 6th October 775.

- At around this time, Baghdad becomes the largest city in the world, taking the lead from Chang'an, capital of China.

==== Asia ====
- Tibet subdues her Himalayan neighbors, and concludes a boundary agreement with the Chinese Tang dynasty (approximate date).
- King Dharmapala begins his reign of Bengal (South Asia).

=== By topic ===
==== Astronomy ====
- A 1.2% growth of carbon-14 concentration recorded in tree rings suggests that a very strong solar storm may have hit Earth, in either 774 or 775. Known as the 774–775 carbon-14 spike, corresponds to the first Miyake event.

=== By place ===
==== Byzantine Empire ====
- April 24 – Emperor Leo IV ("the Khazar") appoints his 5-year-old son Constantine VI co-ruler of the Byzantine Empire. This leads to an uprising, led by one of Leo's half-brothers, Caesar Nikephoros, the second son of former emperor Constantine V. The revolt is quickly suppressed. Fortunately for Nikephoros, his only punishment is to be stripped of his titles, while the rest of the conspirators are blinded, tonsured, and exiled to Cherson (southern Crimea) under guard.

==== Europe ====
- King Charlemagne spends Easter in Treviso (northern Italy), after putting down a rebellion in Friuli and Spoleto. He removes Hrodgaud of Friuli from power, and reforms the duchy as the March of Friuli (military frontier district). Co-conspirators who support the revolt are Arechis II, duke of Benevento, and Adalgis, son of former Lombard king Desiderius. Frankish counts are placed in the cities of Friuli.
- Saxon Wars: The Saxons again revolt against Christianity and Frankish rule. Eresburg falls, but a Saxon assault upon the castle of Syburg fails. Charlemagne hurriedly returns from Italy, launching a counter-offensive which defeats the Saxons. Most of their leaders are summoned to the Lippe at the town of Bad Lippspringe (North Rhine-Westphalia), to submit formally to Charlemagne.

==== Britain ====
- Battle of Otford: King Egbert II of Kent defeats the Mercians under King Offa (near Otford), and re-asserts himself as ruler of Kent.

=== By place ===
==== Europe ====
- Saxon Wars: King Charlemagne spends Easter in Nijmegen, and leads a large Frankish army to Paderborn, where a general assembly of Carolingian and Saxon leaders had been summoned. Saxon lands are integrated into the Frankish Kingdom, and divided into missionary parishes. Duke Widukind and his followers flee to King Sigfred of Denmark, seeking refuge and support.
- Abbasid–Carolingian alliance: Charlemagne receives a request for support from pro-Abbasid rulers in the eastern thughur, or military frontier zone of the Emirate of Córdoba. Several powerful officials and noblemen in northeastern Iberia, such as the governors of Barcelona and Zaragoza, seek to rise up against the Umayyad emir Abd al-Rahman I.

==== Africa ====
- Abd al-Rahman ibn Rustam is recognized as imam of the Ibadis, in Maghreb (western North Africa).

=== By topic ===
==== Religion ====
- Duke Tassilo III of Bavaria founds Kremsmünster Abbey (modern Austria). During this period, the Tassilo Chalice is possibly donated by Luitpirga, wife of Tassilo (approximate date).

=== By place ===
==== Arab Caliphate and Byzantine Empire ====
- Arab–Byzantine War: Emperor Leo IV ("the Khazar") repulses an Abbasid invasion in Anatolia. A Byzantine expeditionary force under Michael Lachanodrakon, military governor (strategos) of the Thracesian Theme, defeats the Muslim-Arabs at the fortress city of Germanikeia in Cilicia (modern Turkey). He plunders the region and takes many captives, mostly Jacobites, who are resettled in Thrace.

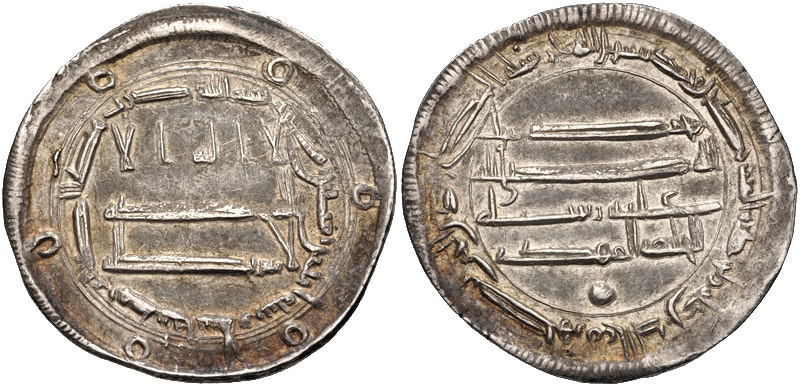
Silver dirham of Arab caliph al-Mahdi, minted at Baghdad in 778/9

==== Europe ====
- A Frankish army (supported by Burgundians, Bavarians, Bretons, Lombards, and Visigoths) under King Charlemagne invades Al-Andalus (modern Spain), and conquers the cities of Pamplona and Barcelona. However, the Franks are halted at Zaragoza, in the thughur or frontier zone of the Emirate of Córdoba.
- August 15 – Battle of Roncevaux Pass (Pyrenees): Charlemagne is defeated by the Basques. Among those killed is Roland, governor of the Breton March, who will be immortalized in the 11th century epic The Song of Roland. This marks the beginning of medieval French literature.
- Saxon Wars: Widukind and his close followers return to Saxony from Denmark. He probably makes alliances with the Danes and the northwestern Slav tribes. Saxon rebels destroy the fortress of Karlsburg and sack Deutz (near Cologne), but are unable to cross the Rhine. They are driven back by the garrison of Koblenz, but then ambush and defeat the Frankish pursuers. Counter-attacking Frankish forces pursue the Saxons up the Lahn Valley, and defeat them near Leisa.

==== Britain ====
- Unrest in Northumbria leads to King Æthelred I ordering the execution of three of his dukes. This considerably weakens his position (approximate date).

=== By topic ===
==== Religion ====
- Saxon raiders destroy many churches deep in Frankish territory. The Benedictine monks of Fulda Abbey (modern-day Hesse) hurriedly carry the relics of Saint Boniface over the Rhön Mountains to safety.

=== By place ===
==== Europe ====
- Saxon Wars: King Charlemagne assembles a Frankish army at Düren, crosses the Rhine at the modern town of Wesel, and defeats the Saxons in battle near Bocholt (North Rhine-Westphalia). All the main Westphalian leaders are captured, except Widukind. Charlemagne crosses the Weser, Oker and Ohre rivers into Eastphalian territory, where local leaders submit to Frankish rule and hand over hostages. Widukind remains in northern Saxony, and relies on guerrilla warfare.

==== Britain ====
- Battle of Bensington: King Offa of Mercia defeats his rival Cynewulf of Wessex at Bensington (modern-day Oxfordshire). He seizes control of Berkshire, and probably London as well. According to sources of the Anglo-Saxon Chronicle Offa becomes "King of All England". Charlemagne writes a letter to him as "his dearest brother", but when Offa refuses to let one of Charlemagne's sons marry one of his daughters, Charlemagne threatens to close the ports to English traders.

==== Asia ====
- June 12 - In China, De Zong (personal name Li Kuo) succeeds his father Dai Zong, as emperor of the Tang Dynasty.

== Significant people ==
- Al-Mansur
- Al-Mahdi
- Al-Fadl ibn Salih

== Births ==
770

- Ansegisus, Frankish abbot (approximate date)
- Jayavarman II, founder of the Khmer Empire (d. 835)
- Michael I, emperor of the Byzantine Empire (d. 844)
- Michael II, emperor of the Byzantine Empire (d. 829)
- Pepin of Italy, son of Charlemagne (or 773)
- Prokopia, empress of the Byzantine Empire (approximate date)
- Stephen IV, pope of the Catholic Church (approximate date)
- Sugawara no Kiyotomo, Japanese nobleman (d. 842)

771

- Al-Hakam I, Muslim emir of Córdoba (d. 822)
- Ubaydallah ibn al-Mahdi, Abbasid prince and politician (d. 810)
- Constantine VI, emperor of the Byzantine Empire (d. 797)

772

- Bai Juyi, Chinese poet and official (d. 846)
- Cui Qun, Chinese Chancellor of the Tang dynasty (d. 832)
- Cui Zhi, Chinese Chancellor of the Tang dynasty (d. 829)
- Li Ao, Chinese philosopher and prose writer (d. 841)
- Liu Yuxi, Chinese poet and philosopher (d. 842)
- probable – Charles the Younger, son of Charlemagne (d. 811)

773

- Duan Wenchang, chancellor of the Tang Dynasty (d. 835)
- Fujiwara no Otsugu, Japanese statesman (d. 843)
- Heizei, emperor of Japan (d. 824)
- Li Su, general of the Tang Dynasty (d. 821)
- Liu Zongyuan, Chinese poet and official (d. 819)
- Pepin of Italy, son of Charlemagne (d. 810)
- Peter of Atroa, Byzantine abbot and saint (d. 837)
- Wei Chuhou, chancellor of the Tang Dynasty (d. 829)

774

- Kūkai, Japanese Buddhist monk (d. 835)

775

- Amalarius, archbishop of Trier (approximate date)
- Ebbo, archbishop of Reims (d. 851)
- Einhard, Frankish scholar (d. 840)
- Fujiwara no Fuyutsugu, Japanese general (d. 826)
- Hilduin, bishop of Paris (d. 840)
- Leo V, Byzantine emperor (d. 820)
- Rotrude, Frankish princess, daughter of Charlemagne (or 778)
- Tahir ibn Husayn, 9th-century Persian Abbasid governor (or 776)
- Theodosia, Byzantine empress (approximate date)
- Theophanes the Branded, Byzantine monk (d. 845)
- Wetti of Reichenau, German scholar (approximate date)

776

- February – Al-Jahiz, Afro-Muslim scholar and writer (d. 868)
- date unknown – Lu Sui, chancellor of the Tang Dynasty (d. 835)
- probable
  - Saint George the Standard-Bearer, archbishop (d. 821)
  - Bai Xingjian, Chinese poet and writer (d. 826)
  - Sahnun ibn Sa'id, Muslim jurist (or 777)
  - Tahir ibn Husayn, Muslim governor (or 775)

777

- date unknown
  - Heungdeok, king of Silla (Korea) (d. 836)
  - Ishaq ibn Rahwayh, Muslim imam (or 778)
  - Masawaiyh, Assyrian physician (d. 857)

778

- Ali ibn al-Madini, Muslim scholar (d. 849)
- Bernard, bishop of Vienne (d. 842)
- Ermengarde of Hesbaye, queen of the Franks (d. 818)
- Ishaq ibn Rahwayh, Muslim scholar and imam (or 777)
- Li Gongzuo, Chinese writer (d. 848)
- Li Shigu, general of the Tang Dynasty (d. 806)
- Liu Gongquan, Chinese calligrapher (d. 865)
- Louis the Pious, king of the Franks (d. 840)
- Rotrude, Frankish princess, daughter of Charlemagne (or 775)
- Xian Zong, emperor of the Tang Dynasty (d. 820)
- Zhaozhou, Chinese Zen Buddhist master (d. 897)

779

- Agobard, archbishop of Lyon (approximate date)
- Ibrahim ibn al-Mahdi, was an Arab prince, singer, composer and poet (d. 839)
- Jia Dao, Chinese poet and Buddhist monk (d. 843)
- Yuan Zhen, politician of the Tang Dynasty (d. 831)

== Deaths ==
770

- August 28 – Kōken, empress of Japan (b. 718)
- Cennselach mac Brain, king of the Uí Ceinnselaig (Ireland)
- Du Fu, Chinese poet (b. 712)
- Ma'n ibn Za'ida al-Shaybani, Arab general (or 769)
- Modestus, Irish missionary (approximate date)
- Opportuna of Montreuil, Frankish abbess
- Tóim Snáma mac Flainn, king of Osraige (Ireland)

771

- December 4 – Carloman I, king of the Franks (b. 751)
- Coirpre mac Fogartaig, king of Brega (Ireland)
- Fujiwara no Nagate, Japanese nobleman (b. 714)
- Approximate date – Amir Kror Suri, also known as Jahan Pahlawan, legendary character in Pashtun history

772

- February 1 – Pope Stephen III
- May 13 – Dōkyō, Japanese Buddhist monk (b. 700)
- July 10 – Amalberga of Temse, Lotharingian nun and saint (b. 741)
- date unknown
  - Dúngal mac Cellaig, king of Osraige (Ireland)
  - Remigius of Rouen, archbishop, illegitimate son of Charles Martel
  - Yuan Jie, Chinese poet
  - Zhu Xicai, Chinese general of the Tang dynasty

773

- June 11 – Li Miao, Tang dynasty Chinese prince
- Brochfael ap Elisedd, king of Powys (Wales)
- Donn Cothaid mac Cathail, king of Connacht (Ireland)
- Khongtekcha, king of Manipur (India)
- Rōben, Japanese Buddhist monk (b. 689)
- Xue Song, general of the Yan and Tang Dynasties

774

- date unknown
  - Abd al-Rahman al-Awza'i, Muslim scholar (b. 707)
  - Abu Mikhnaf, Muslim historian (approximate date)
  - Amoghavajra, Chinese translator (b. 705)
  - Kim Daeseong, Korean minister (b. 700)
  - Aurelius, king of Asturias (Spain)
  - Lady K'awiil Yopaat, queen regnant of the Maya city of Toniná between 762 and 774.
- probable
  - Gummarus, Frankish nobleman and saint (b. 717)
  - Krishna I, ruler of the Rashtrakuta Empire

775

- April 25
  - Smbat VII Bagratuni, Armenian noble
  - Mushegh VI Mamikonian, Armenian noble
- September 14 – Constantine V, Byzantine emperor (b. 718)
- October 6 – Al-Mansur, Muslim caliph (b. 714)
- date unknown
  - Ciniod I, king of the Picts
  - Fujiwara no Kurajimaro, Japanese politician (b. 734)
  - Princess Inoe of Japan (b. 717)
  - Isma'il ibn Jafar, Shī‘ah Imām (approximate date)
  - Kibi no Makibi, Japanese scholar (b. 695)
  - Ruyuan, Chinese Buddhist abbess and master

776

- date unknown
  - Cellach mac Dúnchada, king of Leinster (Ireland)
  - Cináed Ciarrge mac Cathussaig, Dál nAraide king
  - Flaithniadh mac Congal, abbot of Clonfert
  - Hrodgaud, duke of Friuli (Italy)
  - Humayd ibn Qahtaba, Muslim military leader
  - Nuada ua Bolcain, abbot of Tuam (Ireland)

777

- date unknown
  - Feardomhnach, abbot of Tuam (Ireland)
  - Flaithrí mac Domnaill, king of Connacht (Ireland)
  - Fujiwara no Kiyonari, Japanese nobleman (b. 716)
  - Fujiwara no Yoshitsugu, Japanese statesman (b. 716)
  - Ibrāhīm al-Fazārī, Muslim astronomer
  - Waermund, bishop of Worcester
- probable
  - Telerig, ruler (khagan) of Bulgaria
  - Walpurga, Anglo-Saxon missionary (or 779)

778

- August 15 – Roland, Frankish military leader
- Áed Find, king of Dál Riata (Scotland)
- Alpín II, king of the Picts
- Berhthun, bishop of Lichfield (approximate date)
- Congalach mac Conaing, king of South Brega (Ireland)
- Eterscél mac Áeda, king of the Uí Cheinnselaig (Ireland)
- Mac Flaithniadh, abbot of Clonfert (Ireland)
- Niall Frossach, High King of Ireland
- Sufyan al-Thawri, Muslim scholar and jurist (b. 716)

779

- June 10 – Dai Zong, emperor of the Tang Dynasty (b. 727)
- December 17 – Sturm, abbot of Fulda
- Æthelred I, king of East Anglia (approximate date)
- Fujiwara no Momokawa, Japanese statesman (b. 732)
- Gerard I, Frankish count
- Walpurga, Anglo-Saxon abbess (or 777)
