= 773 =

Calendar year

773 in various calendars
- Gregorian calendar: 773; DCCLXXIII
- Ab urbe condita: 1526
- Armenian calendar: 222; ԹՎ ՄԻԲ
- Assyrian calendar: 5523
- Balinese saka calendar: 694–695
- Bengali calendar: 179–180
- Berber calendar: 1723
- Buddhist calendar: 1317
- Burmese calendar: 135
- Byzantine calendar: 6281–6282
- Chinese calendar: 壬子年 (Water Rat); 3470 or 3263 — to — 癸丑年 (Water Ox); 3471 or 3264
- Coptic calendar: 489–490
- Discordian calendar: 1939
- Ethiopian calendar: 765–766
- Hebrew calendar: 4533–4534
- Hindu calendars
- Vikram Samvat: 829–830
- Shaka Samvat: 694–695
- Kali Yuga: 3873–3874
- Holocene calendar: 10773
- Iranian calendar: 151–152
- Islamic calendar: 156–157
- Japanese calendar: Hōki 4 (宝亀４年)
- Javanese calendar: 667–669
- Julian calendar: 773; DCCLXXIII
- Korean calendar: 3106
- Minguo calendar: 1139 before ROC 民前1139年
- Nanakshahi calendar: −695
- Seleucid era: 1084/1085 AG
- Thai solar calendar: 1315–1316
- Tibetan calendar: ཆུ་ཕོ་བྱི་བ་ལོ་ (male Water-Rat); 899 or 518 or −254 — to — ཆུ་མོ་གླང་ལོ་ (female Water-Ox); 900 or 519 or −253

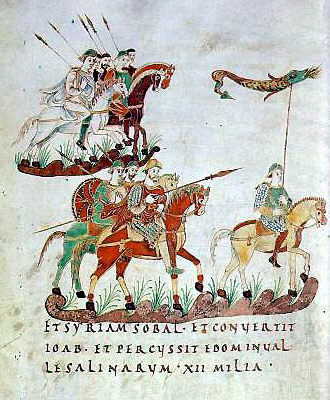
Frankish cavalry (with mail armour)

Year 773 (DCCLXXIII) was a common year starting on Friday of the Julian calendar, the 773rd year of the Common Era (CE) and Anno Domini (AD) designations, the 773rd year of the 1st millennium, the 73rd year of the 8th century, and the 4th year of the 770s decade. The denomination 773 for this year has been used since the early medieval period, when the Anno Domini calendar era became the prevalent method in Europe for naming years.

== Events ==
=== By place ===
==== Europe ====
- Summer – King Charlemagne and his uncle Bernard, son of Charles Martel, cross the Alps with a Frankish expeditionary force at the request of Pope Adrian I. At the foot of the mountains in the Susa Valley (Northern Italy), the Franks are hindered by Lombard fortifications. After scouting, Charlemagne attacks the defenders from the flank, and forces the Lombards to flee to the fortified capital Pavia.
- Siege of Pavia: Charlemagne besieges Pavia, which is poorly stocked with food. King Desiderius remains in the capital, and orders his son Adalgis to defend Verona to guard Gerberga, and the children of Carloman I. After a short siege, Adalgis flees to Constantinople, where he is received by Emperor Constantine V. Meanwhile, the Franks capture the cities of Verona and Mortara.
- Saxon Wars: Saxon forces seize upon Charlemagne's preoccupation with Italy to retake Eresburg and Syburg (near Dortmund). They unsuccessfully attack the episcopal centre of Büraburg, which had been established by St. Boniface (see 723).

==== Britain ====
- King Alhred of Northumbria makes overtures of friendship toward Charlemagne (approximate date).

==== Abbasid Caliphate ====
- The number 0 is introduced to the city of Baghdad, which will be developed in the Middle East by Arabian mathematicians, who will base their numbers on the Indian system (long after the Maya culture developed the concept, cf. Maya numerals).

==== Asia ====
- King Khongtekcha of Manipur (modern India) dies after a 10-year reign; during his rule the Meitei language script first appears.

=== By topic ===
==== Ecology ====
- A large and sudden increase in radiocarbon (^{14}C) occurs around 773, in coral skeletons from the South China Sea (see 774-775 carbon-14 spike).

== Births ==
- Duan Wenchang, chancellor of the Tang Dynasty (d. 835)
- Fujiwara no Otsugu, Japanese statesman (d. 843)
- Heizei, emperor of Japan (d. 824)
- Li Su, general of the Tang Dynasty (d. 821)
- Liu Zongyuan, Chinese poet and official (d. 819)
- Pepin of Italy, son of Charlemagne (d. 810)
- Peter of Atroa, Byzantine abbot and saint (d. 837)
- Wei Chuhou, chancellor of the Tang Dynasty (d. 829)

== Deaths ==
- June 11 – Li Miao, Tang dynasty Chinese prince
- Brochfael ap Elisedd, king of Powys (Wales)
- Donn Cothaid mac Cathail, king of Connacht (Ireland)
- Khongtekcha, king of Manipur (India)
- Rōben, Japanese Buddhist monk (b. 689)
- Xue Song, general of the Yan and Tang Dynasties
