= 776 =

Calendar year

776 in various calendars
- Gregorian calendar: 776; DCCLXXVI
- Ab urbe condita: 1529
- Armenian calendar: 225; ԹՎ ՄԻԵ
- Assyrian calendar: 5526
- Balinese saka calendar: 697–698
- Bengali calendar: 182–183
- Berber calendar: 1726
- Buddhist calendar: 1320
- Burmese calendar: 138
- Byzantine calendar: 6284–6285
- Chinese calendar: 乙卯年 (Wood Rabbit); 3473 or 3266 — to — 丙辰年 (Fire Dragon); 3474 or 3267
- Coptic calendar: 492–493
- Discordian calendar: 1942
- Ethiopian calendar: 768–769
- Hebrew calendar: 4536–4537
- Hindu calendars
- Vikram Samvat: 832–833
- Shaka Samvat: 697–698
- Kali Yuga: 3876–3877
- Holocene calendar: 10776
- Iranian calendar: 154–155
- Islamic calendar: 159–160
- Japanese calendar: Hōki 7 (宝亀７年)
- Javanese calendar: 671–672
- Julian calendar: 776; DCCLXXVI
- Korean calendar: 3109
- Minguo calendar: 1136 before ROC 民前1136年
- Nanakshahi calendar: −692
- Seleucid era: 1087/1088 AG
- Thai solar calendar: 1318–1319
- Tibetan calendar: ཤིང་མོ་ཡོས་ལོ་ (female Wood-Hare); 902 or 521 or −251 — to — མེ་ཕོ་འབྲུག་ལོ་ (male Fire-Dragon); 903 or 522 or −250

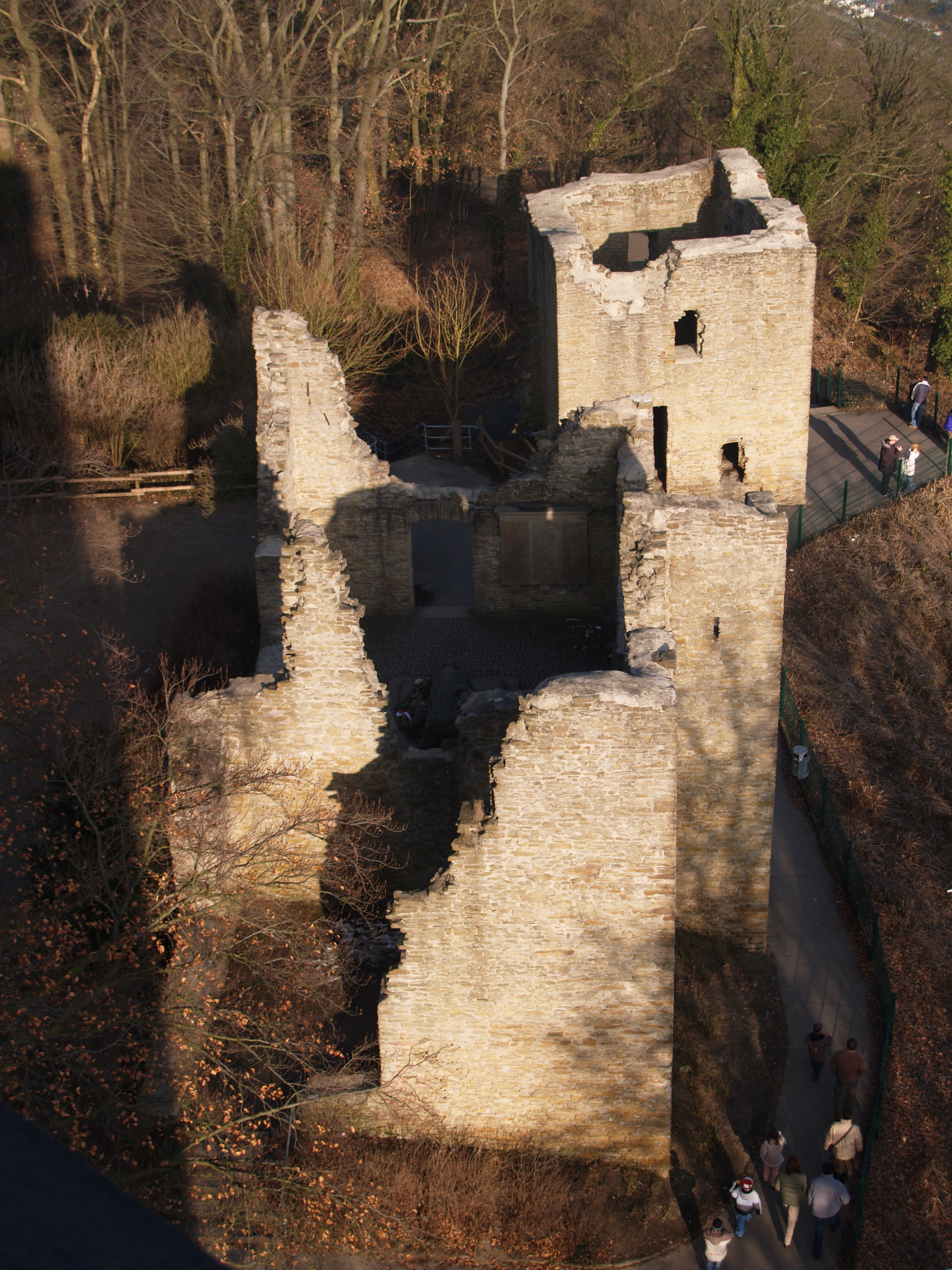
Ruins of Castle Syburg (near Dortmund)

Year 776 (DCCLXXVI) was a leap year starting on Monday of the Julian calendar. The denomination 776 for this year has been used since the early medieval period, when the Anno Domini calendar era became the prevalent method in Europe for naming years.

== Events ==
=== By place ===
==== Byzantine Empire ====
- April 24 – Emperor Leo IV ("the Khazar") appoints his 5-year-old son Constantine VI co-ruler of the Byzantine Empire. This leads to an uprising, led by one of Leo's half-brothers, Caesar Nikephoros, the second son of former emperor Constantine V. The revolt is quickly suppressed. Fortunately for Nikephoros, his only punishment is to be stripped of his titles, while the rest of the conspirators are blinded, tonsured, and exiled to Cherson (southern Crimea) under guard.

==== Europe ====
- King Charlemagne spends Easter in Treviso (northern Italy), after putting down a rebellion in Friuli and Spoleto. He removes Hrodgaud of Friuli from power, and reforms the duchy as the March of Friuli (military frontier district). Co-conspirators who support the revolt are Arechis II, duke of Benevento, and Adalgis, son of former Lombard king Desiderius. Frankish counts are placed in the cities of Friuli.
- Saxon Wars: The Saxons again revolt against Christianity and Frankish rule. Eresburg falls, but a Saxon assault upon the castle of Syburg fails. Charlemagne hurriedly returns from Italy, launching a counter-offensive which defeats the Saxons. Most of their leaders are summoned to the Lippe at the town of Bad Lippspringe (North Rhine-Westphalia), to submit formally to Charlemagne.

==== Britain ====
- Battle of Otford: King Egbert II of Kent defeats the Mercians under King Offa (near Otford), and re-asserts himself as ruler of Kent.

== Births ==
- February – Al-Jahiz, Afro-Muslim scholar and writer (d. 868)
- date unknown – Lu Sui, chancellor of the Tang Dynasty (d. 835)
- probable
  - Saint George the Standard-Bearer, archbishop (d. 821)
  - Bai Xingjian, Chinese poet and writer (d. 826)
  - Sahnun ibn Sa'id, Muslim jurist (or 777)
  - Tahir ibn Husayn, Muslim governor (or 775)

== Deaths ==
- date unknown
  - Cellach mac Dúnchada, king of Leinster (Ireland)
  - Cináed Ciarrge mac Cathussaig, Dál nAraide king
  - Flaithniadh mac Congal, abbot of Clonfert
  - Hrodgaud, duke of Friuli (Italy)
  - Humayd ibn Qahtaba, Muslim military leader
  - Nuada ua Bolcain, abbot of Tuam (Ireland)
