= 775 =

Calendar year

775 in various calendars
| Gregorian calendar | 775; DCCLXXV |
| Ab urbe condita | 1528 |
| Armenian calendar | 224; ԹՎ ՄԻԴ |
| Assyrian calendar | 5525 |
| Balinese saka calendar | 696–697 |
| Bengali calendar | 181–182 |
| Berber calendar | 1725 |
| Buddhist calendar | 1319 |
| Burmese calendar | 137 |
| Byzantine calendar | 6283–6284 |
| Chinese calendar | 甲寅年 (Wood Tiger); 3472 or 3265 — to — 乙卯年 (Wood Rabbit); 3473 or 3266 |
| Coptic calendar | 491–492 |
| Discordian calendar | 1941 |
| Ethiopian calendar | 767–768 |
| Hebrew calendar | 4535–4536 |
- Hindu calendars
| Vikram Samvat | 831–832 |
| Shaka Samvat | 696–697 |
| Kali Yuga | 3875–3876 |
| Holocene calendar | 10775 |
| Iranian calendar | 153–154 |
| Islamic calendar | 158–159 |
| Japanese calendar | Hōki 6 (宝亀６年) |
| Javanese calendar | 670–671 |
| Julian calendar | 775; DCCLXXV |
| Korean calendar | 3108 |
| Minguo calendar | 1137 before ROC 民前1137年 |
| Nanakshahi calendar | −693 |
| Seleucid era | 1086/1087 AG |
| Thai solar calendar | 1317–1318 |
| Tibetan calendar | ཤིང་ཕོ་སྟག་ལོ་ (male Wood-Tiger); 901 or 520 or −252 — to — ཤིང་མོ་ཡོས་ལོ་ (female Wood-Hare); 902 or 521 or −251 |

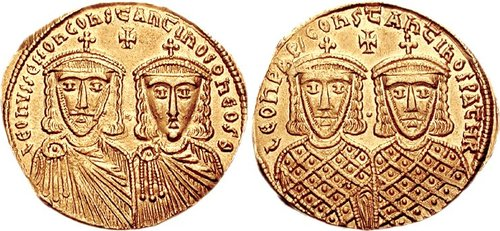
Emperor Leo IV and his son Constantine VI

Year 775 (DCCLXXV) was a common year starting on Sunday of the Julian calendar. The denomination 775 for this year has been used since the early medieval period, when the Anno Domini calendar era became the prevalent method in Europe for naming years.

== Events ==
=== By place ===
==== Byzantine Empire ====
- September 14 – Emperor Constantine V dies while on a campaign in Bulgaria. In his 34-year reign he has suppressed monasticism and image worship, restored aqueducts, revived commerce, and repopulated Constantinople. He is succeeded by his 25-year-old son Leo IV ("the Khazar"), who continues Constantine's campaigns against the Bulgars and Muslim Arabs.

==== Europe ====
- Saxon Wars: King Charlemagne holds a major assembly at Quierzy (Northern France). He leads a Frankish army into Saxony to retake the castrum of Syburg (near Dortmund), then rebuilds and garrisons fortified Eresburg. He reaches the Weser at a place called Braunsberg, where the Saxons stand for battle, but are defeated when Frankish troops cross the river.
- Westphalian Saxons, probably commanded by Widukind, cross the Weser and fight an inconclusive battle at Hlidbeck (modern-day Lübbecke). Charlemagne claims victory, but perhaps in reality suffers a setback. He reunites his forces and inflicts a real defeat upon the Saxons, seizing considerable booty and taking hostages, though Widukind escapes.
- Autumn – Charlemagne retakes the Hellweg (main corridor) along the Lippe Valley, establishing communications between Austrasia, Hesse and Thuringia. It is used as a trade route under Frankish supervision.
- The German city of Giessen (Hesse) is founded.

==== Africa ====
- Andalusian merchants set up an emporium (trade settlement) on the Maghreb coast at Ténès (modern Algeria). It is early evidence of the revival of the maritime trade in the Western Mediterranean, after the chaos of the early 8th century.

==== Arab Caliphate ====
- April 25 – Battle of Bagrevand: The Abbasids put an end to an Armenian rebellion. Muslim control over Transcaucasia is solidified, while several major Armenian nakharar families, notably the Mamikonian, lose power and flee to the Byzantine Empire.
- Caliph al-Mansur (r. 754–775) dies after a 21-year reign, in which he has made Baghdad the residence of the Abbasid Caliphate. He is succeeded by his son al-Mahdi.

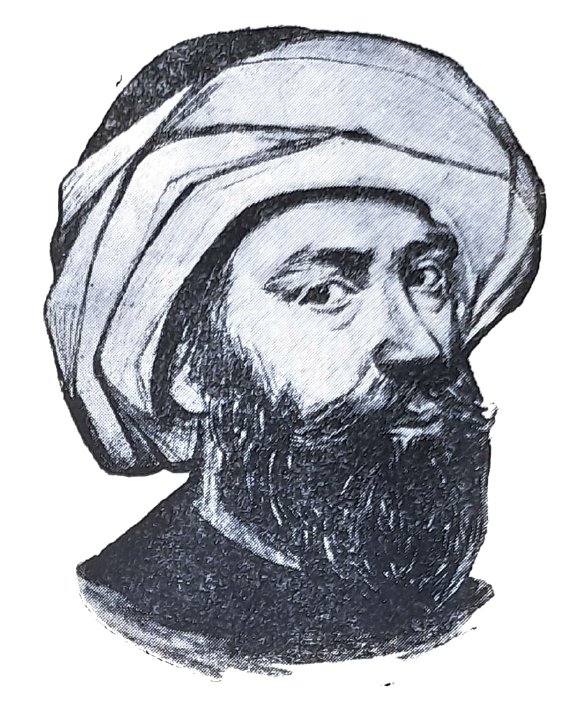
Abbasid caliph al-Mansur was succeeded by his heir and son Al-Mahdi, on 6th October 775.

- At around this time, Baghdad becomes the largest city in the world, taking the lead from Chang'an, capital of China.

==== Asia ====
- Tibet subdues her Himalayan neighbors, and concludes a boundary agreement with the Chinese Tang dynasty (approximate date).
- King Dharmapala begins his reign of Bengal (South Asia).

=== By topic ===
==== Astronomy ====
- A 1.2% growth of carbon-14 concentration recorded in tree rings suggests that a very strong solar storm may have hit Earth, in either 774 or 775. Known as the 774–775 carbon-14 spike, corresponds to the first Miyake event.

== Births ==
- Amalarius, archbishop of Trier (approximate date)
- Ebbo, archbishop of Reims (d. 851)
- Einhard, Frankish scholar (d. 840)
- Fujiwara no Fuyutsugu, Japanese general (d. 826)
- Hilduin, bishop of Paris (d. 840)
- Leo V, Byzantine emperor (d. 820)
- Rotrude, Frankish princess, daughter of Charlemagne (or 778)
- Tahir ibn Husayn, 9th-century Persian Abbasid governor (or 776)
- Theodosia, Byzantine empress (approximate date)
- Theophanes the Branded, Byzantine monk (d. 845)
- Wetti of Reichenau, German scholar (approximate date)

== Deaths ==
- April 25
  - Smbat VII Bagratuni, Armenian noble
  - Mushegh VI Mamikonian, Armenian noble
- September 14 – Constantine V, Byzantine emperor (b. 718)
- October 6 – Al-Mansur, Muslim caliph (b. 714)
- date unknown
  - Ciniod I, king of the Picts
  - Fujiwara no Kurajimaro, Japanese politician (b. 734)
  - Princess Inoe of Japan (b. 717)
  - Isma'il ibn Jafar, Shī‘ah Imām (approximate date)
  - Kibi no Makibi, Japanese scholar (b. 695)
  - Ruyuan, Chinese Buddhist abbess and master
