= 778 =

Calendar year

778 in various calendars
Gregorian calendar	778; DCCLXXVIII
Ab urbe condita	1531
Armenian calendar	227; ԹՎ ՄԻԷ
Assyrian calendar	5528
Balinese saka calendar	699–700
Bengali calendar	184–185
Berber calendar	1728
Buddhist calendar	1322
Burmese calendar	140
Byzantine calendar	6286–6287
Chinese calendar	丁巳年 (Fire Snake); 3475 or 3268 — to — 戊午年 (Earth Horse); 3476 or 3269
Coptic calendar	494–495
Discordian calendar	1944
Ethiopian calendar	770–771
Hebrew calendar	4538–4539
- Hindu calendars
Vikram Samvat	834–835
Shaka Samvat	699–700
Kali Yuga	3878–3879
Holocene calendar	10778
Iranian calendar	156–157
Islamic calendar	161–162
Japanese calendar	Hōki 9 (宝亀９年)
Javanese calendar	673–674
Julian calendar	778; DCCLXXVIII
Korean calendar	3111
Minguo calendar	1134 before ROC 民前1134年
Nanakshahi calendar	−690
Seleucid era	1089/1090 AG
Thai solar calendar	1320–1321
Tibetan calendar	阴火蛇年 (female Fire-Snake); 904 or 523 or −249 — to — 阳土马年 (male Earth-Horse); 905 or 524 or −248

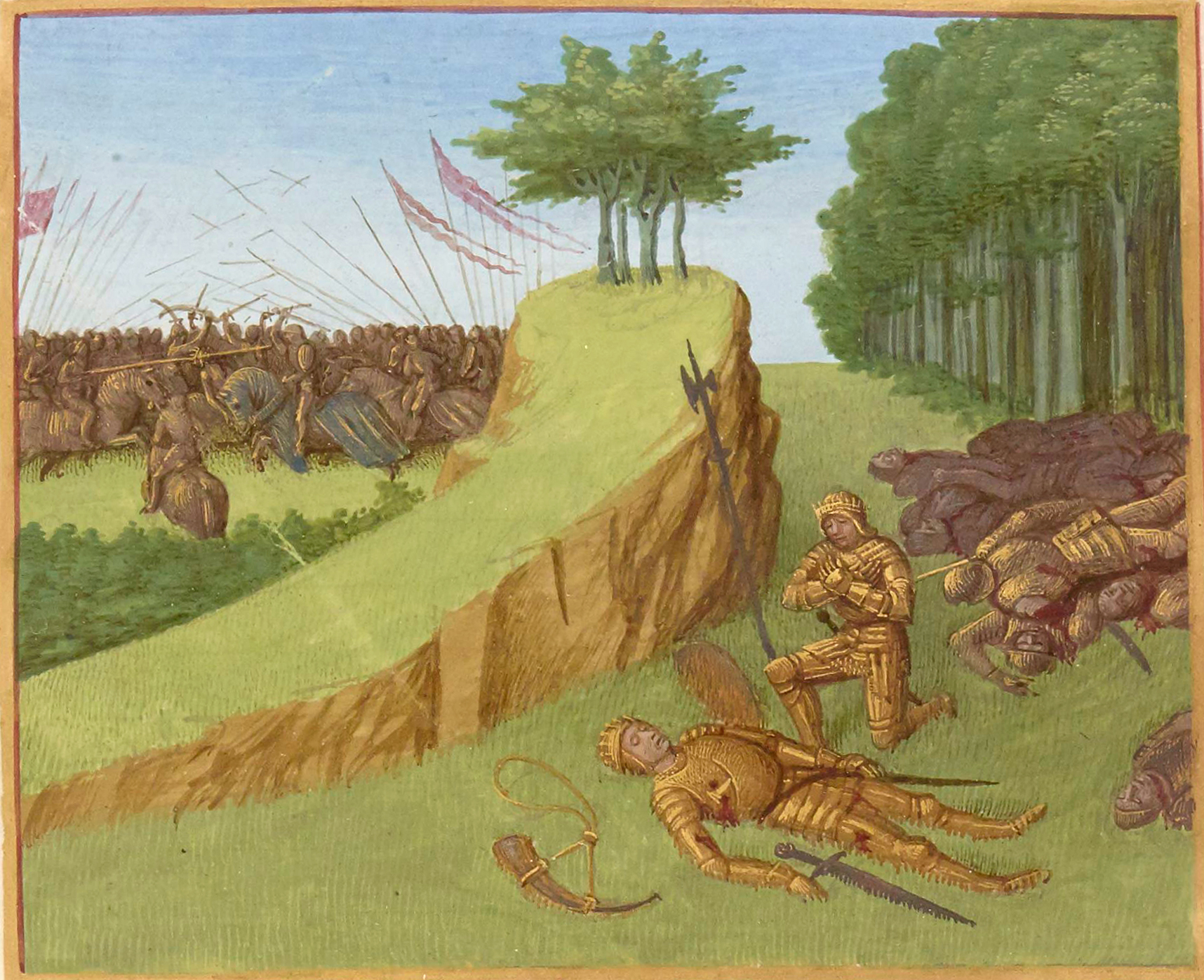
The death of Roland (Battle of Roncevaux)

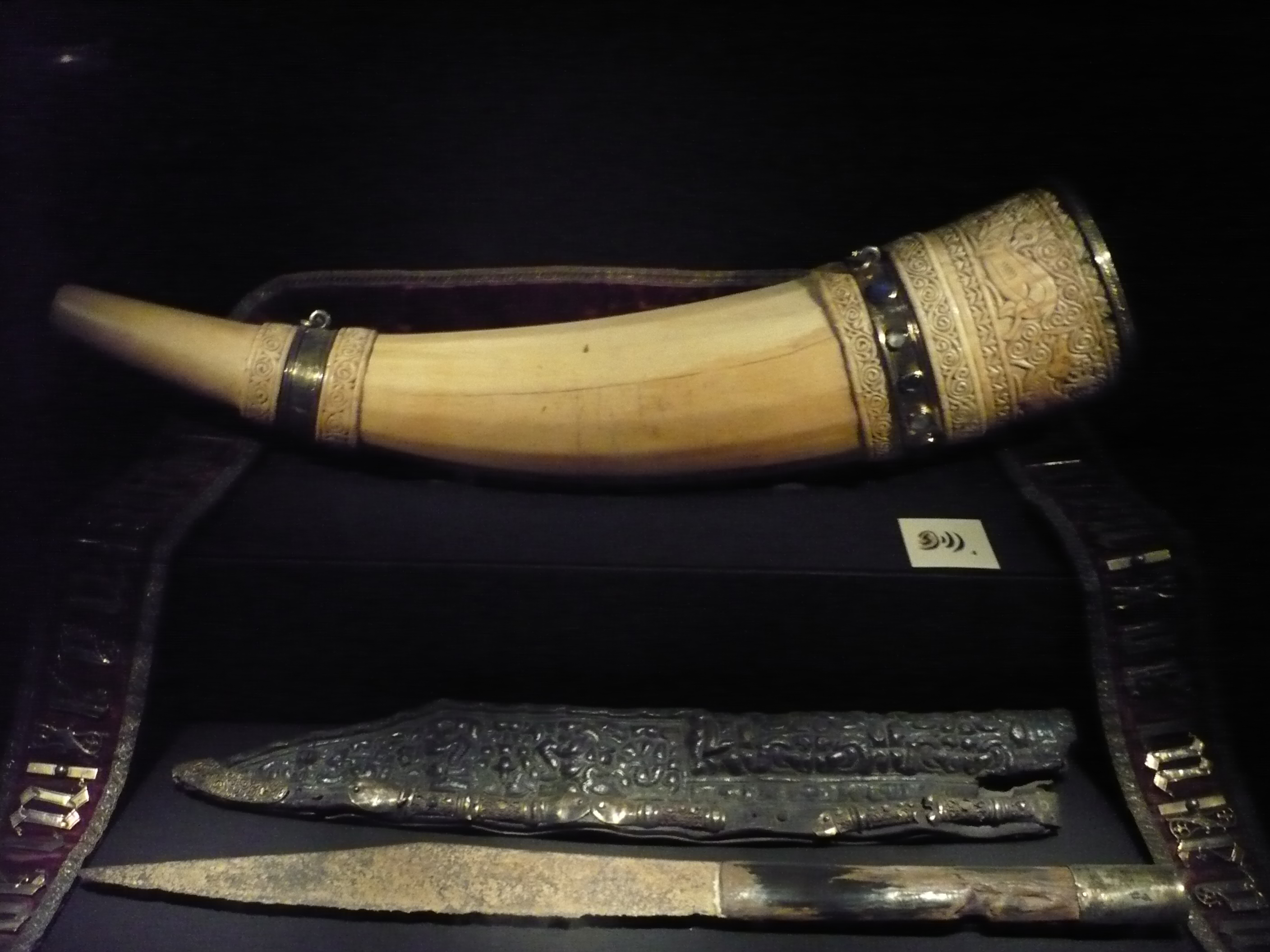
Olifant, Roland's horn (Aachen Cathedral)

Year 778 (DCCLXXVIII) was a common year starting on Thursday of the Julian calendar, the 778th year of the Common Era (CE) and Anno Domini (AD) designations, the 778th year of the 1st millennium, the 78th year of the 8th century, and the 9th year of the 770s decade. The denomination 778 for this year has been used since the early medieval period, when the Anno Domini calendar era became the prevalent method in Europe for naming years.

== Events ==
=== By place ===
==== Arab Caliphate and Byzantine Empire ====
- Arab–Byzantine War: Emperor Leo IV ("the Khazar") repulses an Abbasid invasion in Anatolia. A Byzantine expeditionary force under Michael Lachanodrakon, military governor (strategos) of the Thracesian Theme, defeats the Muslim-Arabs at the fortress city of Germanikeia in Cilicia (modern Turkey). He plunders the region and takes many captives, mostly Jacobites, who are resettled in Thrace.

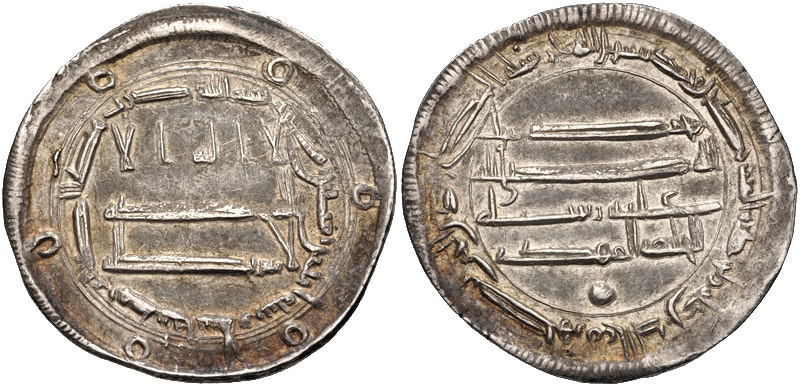
Silver dirham of Arab caliph al-Mahdi, minted at Baghdad in 778/9

==== Europe ====
- A Frankish army (supported by Burgundians, Bavarians, Bretons, Lombards, and Visigoths) under King Charlemagne invades Al-Andalus (modern Spain), and conquers the cities of Pamplona and Barcelona. However, the Franks are halted at Zaragoza, in the thughur or frontier zone of the Emirate of Córdoba.
- August 15 – Battle of Roncevaux Pass (Pyrenees): Charlemagne is defeated by the Basques. Among those killed is Roland, governor of the Breton March, who will be immortalized in the 11th century epic The Song of Roland. This marks the beginning of medieval French literature.
- Saxon Wars: Widukind and his close followers return to Saxony from Denmark. He probably makes alliances with the Danes and the northwestern Slav tribes. Saxon rebels destroy the fortress of Karlsburg and sack Deutz (near Cologne), but are unable to cross the Rhine. They are driven back by the garrison of Koblenz, but then ambush and defeat the Frankish pursuers. Counter-attacking Frankish forces pursue the Saxons up the Lahn Valley, and defeat them near Leisa.

==== Britain ====
- Unrest in Northumbria leads to King Æthelred I ordering the execution of three of his dukes. This considerably weakens his position (approximate date).

=== By topic ===
==== Religion ====
- Saxon raiders destroy many churches deep in Frankish territory. The Benedictine monks of Fulda Abbey (modern-day Hesse) hurriedly carry the relics of Saint Boniface over the Rhön Mountains to safety.
- In Japan, the Kiyomizu-dera Buddhist temple is founded in Kyoto. Its main hall (Hondo) is built in 1633 without a single nail.

== Births ==
- Ali ibn al-Madini, Muslim scholar (d. 849)
- Bernard, bishop of Vienne (d. 842)
- Ermengarde of Hesbaye, queen of the Franks (d. 818)
- Ishaq ibn Rahwayh, Muslim scholar and imam (or 777)
- Li Gongzuo, Chinese writer (d. 848)
- Li Shigu, general of the Tang Dynasty (d. 806)
- Liu Gongquan, Chinese calligrapher (d. 865)
- Louis the Pious, king of the Franks (d. 840)
- Rotrude, Frankish princess, daughter of Charlemagne (or 775)
- Xian Zong, emperor of the Tang Dynasty (d. 820)
- Zhaozhou, Chinese Zen Buddhist master (d. 897)

== Deaths ==
- August 15 – Roland, Frankish military leader
- Áed Find, king of Dál Riata (Scotland)
- Alpín II, king of the Picts
- Berhthun, bishop of Lichfield (approximate date)
- Congalach mac Conaing, king of South Brega (Ireland)
- Eterscél mac Áeda, king of the Uí Cheinnselaig (Ireland)
- Mac Flaithniadh, abbot of Clonfert (Ireland)
- Niall Frossach, High King of Ireland
- Sufyan al-Thawri, Muslim scholar and jurist (b. 716)
