= AD 777 =

Calendar year

777 in various calendars
- Gregorian calendar: 777; DCCLXXVII
- Ab urbe condita: 1530
- Armenian calendar: 226; ԹՎ ՄԻԶ
- Assyrian calendar: 5527
- Balinese saka calendar: 698–699
- Bengali calendar: 183–184
- Berber calendar: 1727
- Buddhist calendar: 1321
- Burmese calendar: 139
- Byzantine calendar: 6285–6286
- Chinese calendar: 丙辰年 (Fire Dragon); 3474 or 3267 — to — 丁巳年 (Fire Snake); 3475 or 3268
- Coptic calendar: 493–494
- Discordian calendar: 1943
- Ethiopian calendar: 769–770
- Hebrew calendar: 4537–4538
- Hindu calendars
- Vikram Samvat: 833–834
- Shaka Samvat: 698–699
- Kali Yuga: 3877–3878
- Holocene calendar: 10777
- Iranian calendar: 155–156
- Islamic calendar: 160–161
- Japanese calendar: Hōki 8 (宝亀８年)
- Javanese calendar: 672–673
- Julian calendar: 777; DCCLXXVII
- Korean calendar: 3110
- Minguo calendar: 1135 before ROC 民前1135年
- Nanakshahi calendar: −691
- Seleucid era: 1088/1089 AG
- Thai solar calendar: 1319–1320
- Tibetan calendar: མེ་ཕོ་འབྲུག་ལོ་ (male Fire-Dragon); 903 or 522 or −250 — to — མེ་མོ་སྦྲུལ་ལོ་ (female Fire-Snake); 904 or 523 or −249

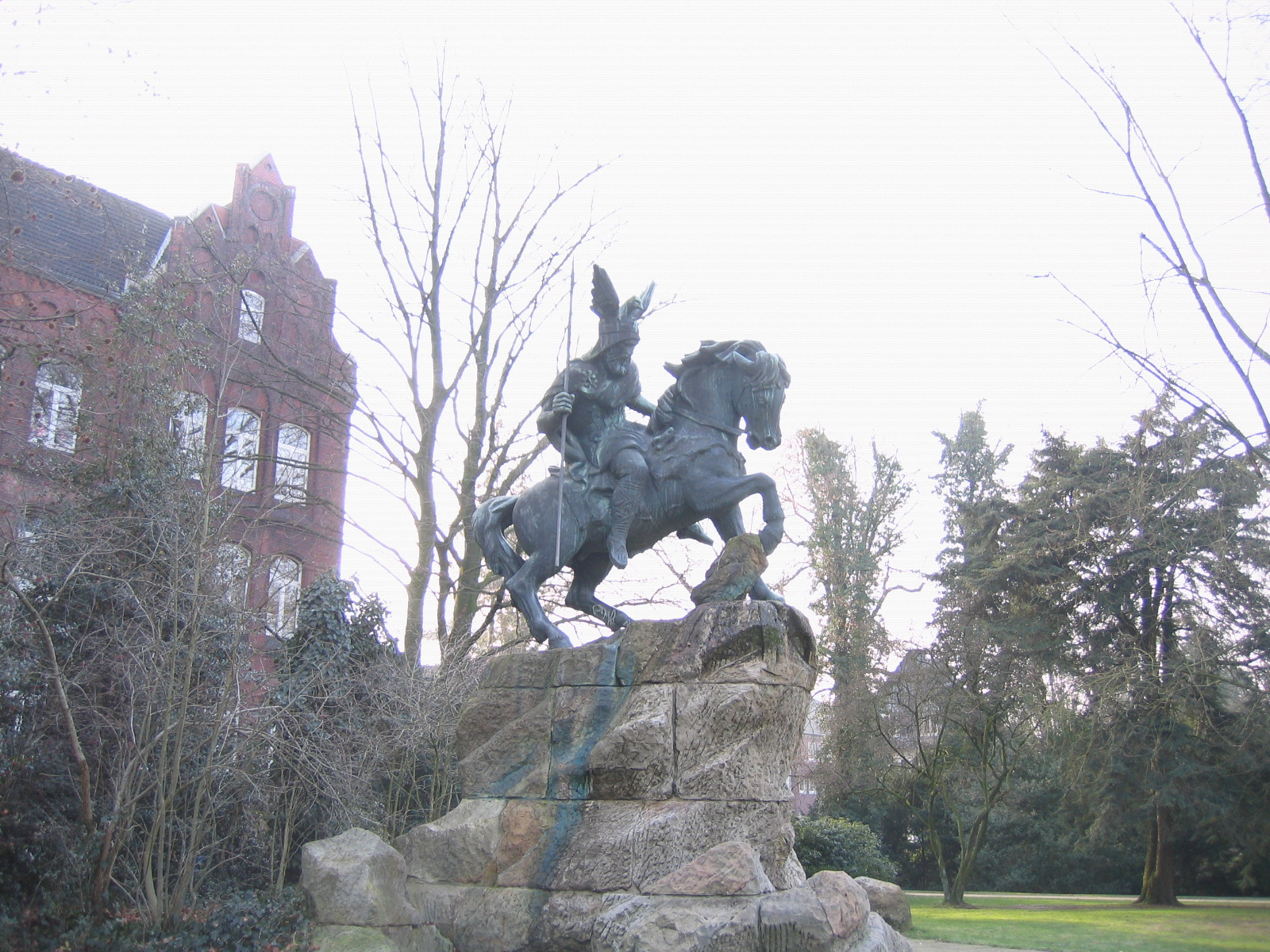
Duke Widukind (North Rhine-Westphalia)

Year 777 (DCCLXXVII) was a common year starting on Wednesday of the Julian calendar, the 777th year of the Common Era (CE) and Anno Domini (AD) designations, the 777th year of the 1st millennium, the 77th year of the 8th century, and the 8th year of the 770s decade. The denomination 777 for this year has been used since the early medieval period, when the Anno Domini calendar era became the prevalent method in Europe for naming years.

== Events ==
=== By place ===
==== Europe ====
- Saxon Wars: King Charlemagne spends Easter in Nijmegen, and leads a large Frankish army to Paderborn, where a general assembly of Carolingian and Saxon leaders had been summoned. Saxon lands are integrated into the Frankish Kingdom, and divided into missionary parishes. Duke Widukind and his followers flee to King Sigfred of Denmark, seeking refuge and support.
- Abbasid–Carolingian alliance: Charlemagne receives a request for support from pro-Abbasid rulers in the eastern thughur, or military frontier zone of the Emirate of Córdoba. Several powerful officials and noblemen in northeastern Iberia, such as the governors of Barcelona and Zaragoza, seek to rise up against the Umayyad emir Abd al-Rahman I.

==== Africa ====
- Abd al-Rahman ibn Rustam is recognized as imam of the Ibadis, in Maghreb (western North Africa).

=== By topic ===
==== Religion ====
- Duke Tassilo III of Bavaria founds Kremsmünster Abbey (modern Austria). During this period, the Tassilo Chalice is possibly donated by Luitpirga, wife of Tassilo (approximate date).

== Births ==
- date unknown
  - Heungdeok, king of Silla (Korea) (d. 836)
  - Ishaq ibn Rahwayh, Muslim imam (or 778)
  - Masawaiyh, Assyrian physician (d. 857)

== Deaths ==
- date unknown
  - Feardomhnach, abbot of Tuam (Ireland)
  - Flaithrí mac Domnaill, king of Connacht (Ireland)
  - Fujiwara no Kiyonari, Japanese nobleman (b. 716)
  - Fujiwara no Yoshitsugu, Japanese statesman (b. 716)
  - Ibrāhīm al-Fazārī, Muslim astronomer
  - Waermund, bishop of Worcester
- probable
  - Telerig, ruler (khagan) of Bulgaria
  - Walpurga, Anglo-Saxon missionary (or 779)
