= Ruyuan =

Ruyuan may refer to:

- Ruyuan Yao Autonomous County, in Guangdong, China
- Ruyuan (abbess) (died 775), Tang dynasty abbess
