= Rotruda =

Rotruda may refer to:

- Rotruda, a synonym of Phycitodes, a genus of snout moths
- Rotrude, a feminine Germanic given name
