= 821 =

Calendar year

821 in various calendars
Gregorian calendar	821; DCCCXXI
Ab urbe condita	1574
Armenian calendar	270; ԹՎ ՄՀ
Assyrian calendar	5571
Balinese saka calendar	742–743
Bengali calendar	227–228
Berber calendar	1771
Buddhist calendar	1365
Burmese calendar	183
Byzantine calendar	6329–6330
Chinese calendar	庚子年 (Metal Rat); 3518 or 3311 — to — 辛丑年 (Metal Ox); 3519 or 3312
Coptic calendar	537–538
Discordian calendar	1987
Ethiopian calendar	813–814
Hebrew calendar	4581–4582
- Hindu calendars
Vikram Samvat	877–878
Shaka Samvat	742–743
Kali Yuga	3921–3922
Holocene calendar	10821
Iranian calendar	199–200
Islamic calendar	205–206
Japanese calendar	Kōnin 12 (弘仁１２年)
Javanese calendar	717–718
Julian calendar	821; DCCCXXI
Korean calendar	3154
Minguo calendar	1091 before ROC 民前1091年
Nanakshahi calendar	−647
Seleucid era	1132/1133 AG
Thai solar calendar	1363–1364
Tibetan calendar	ལྕགས་ཕོ་བྱི་བ་ལོ་ (male Iron-Rat); 947 or 566 or −206 — to — ལྕགས་མོ་གླང་ལོ་ (female Iron-Ox); 948 or 567 or −205

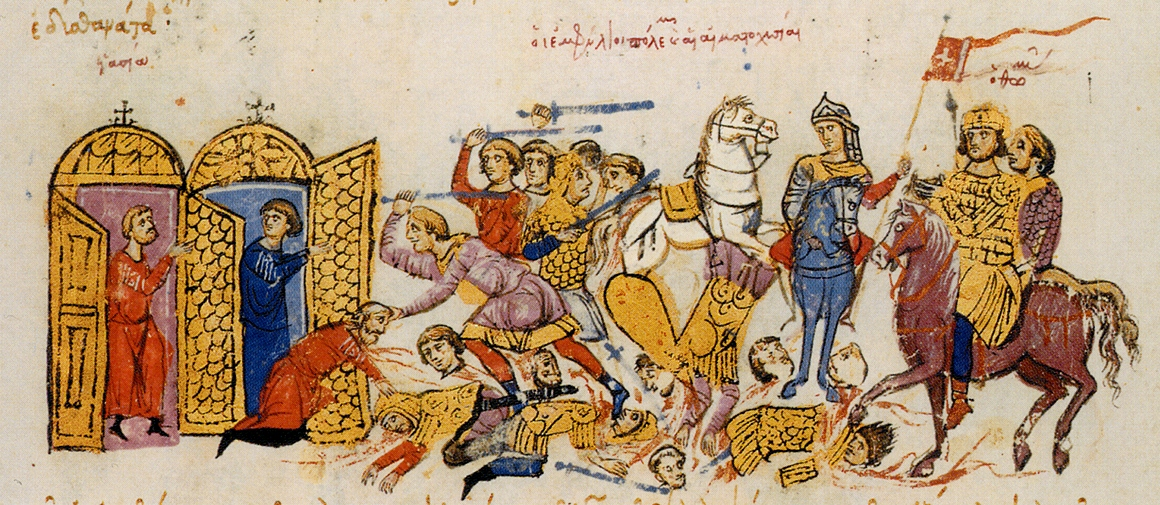
Thomas the Slav captures cities in Anatolia

Year 821 (DCCCXXI) was a common year starting on Tuesday of the Julian calendar.

== Events ==
=== By place ===
==== Byzantine Empire ====
- Byzantine general Thomas the Slav leads a revolt, and secures control over most of the Byzantine themes (provinces) in Anatolia. He gets recognition from the Abbasid Caliphate, and concludes a peace treaty with Caliph al-Ma'mun. Thomas crosses with his fleet from Abydos to Thrace, and blockades Emperor Michael II in Constantinople; but Thomas' first attack on the capital fails.

==== Europe ====
- February – Duke Borna of Croatia dies after an 11-year reign, as vassal of the Frankish Empire. He is succeeded by his nephew, Vladislav. Emperor Louis I recognizes him as prince of Dalmatia and Liburnia, at the Council of Aachen.
- October – Lothair I, co-emperor and eldest son of Louis I, marries Ermengarde in Thionville (northeastern France). She is the daughter of Count Hugh of Tours.

==== Britain ====
- King Coenwulf of Mercia dies in Basingwerk near Holywell (Wales), while preparing for another assault on Powys, and is buried in Winchcombe Abbey. He is briefly succeeded by his son Cynehelm, but he is killed, probably fighting the Welsh, though supposedly through the treachery of his sister Cwenthryth. The Mercian throne passes to Coenwulf's brother, Ceolwulf I.

==== Abbasid Caliphate ====
- By the time Al-Ma'mun becomes caliph, the Arabs and the Byzantines have settled down into border skirmishing, with Arab raids deep into Anatolia to capture booty.
- Tahir ibn Husayn, an Iranian general, is appointed as governor of Khurasan, as a reward for supporting the Abbasid caliph al-Ma'mun in the Fourth Fitna.
- Caliph Al-Ma'mun appoints Nu'aym ibn al-Waddah al-Azdi as the governor of Yemen.

== Births ==
- Gao Pian, general of the Tang dynasty (d. 887)
- Gisela, Frankish princess, daughter of Louis the Pious
- Ibn Abi Asim, Muslim Sunni scholar (or 822)
- Ordoño I, king of Asturias (approximate date)

== Deaths ==
- April 7 – George the Standard-Bearer, archbishop of Mytilene (b. c. 776)
- May 2 – Liu Zong, general of the Tang dynasty
- December 18 – Theodulf, bishop of Orléans
- Arno, archbishop of Salzburg
- Artrí mac Cathail, king of Munster (Ireland)
- Benedict of Aniane, Frankish monk
- Borna, duke (knez) of Croatia
- Coenwulf, king of Mercia
- Egbert, bishop of Lindisfarne
- Guisclafred, Frankish nobleman (approximate date)
- Li Su, general of the Tang dynasty (b. 773)
- Tian Hongzheng, general of the Tang dynasty (b. 764)
- Wei Guanzhi, chancellor of the Tang dynasty (b. 760)
- Zheng Yuqing, chancellor of the Tang dynasty (b. 746)
