= 717 =

Calendar year

717 in various calendars
Gregorian calendar	717; DCCXVII
Ab urbe condita	1470
Armenian calendar	166; ԹՎ ՃԿԶ
Assyrian calendar	5467
Balinese saka calendar	638–639
Bengali calendar	123–124
Berber calendar	1667
Buddhist calendar	1261
Burmese calendar	79
Byzantine calendar	6225–6226
Chinese calendar	丙辰年 (Fire Dragon); 3414 or 3207 — to — 丁巳年 (Fire Snake); 3415 or 3208
Coptic calendar	433–434
Discordian calendar	1883
Ethiopian calendar	709–710
Hebrew calendar	4477–4478
- Hindu calendars
Vikram Samvat	773–774
Shaka Samvat	638–639
Kali Yuga	3817–3818
Holocene calendar	10717
Iranian calendar	95–96
Islamic calendar	98–99
Japanese calendar	Reiki 3 / Yōrō 1 (養老元年)
Javanese calendar	610–611
Julian calendar	717; DCCXVII
Korean calendar	3050
Minguo calendar	1195 before ROC 民前1195年
Nanakshahi calendar	−751
Seleucid era	1028/1029 AG
Thai solar calendar	1259–1260
Tibetan calendar	མེ་ཕོ་འབྲུག་ལོ་ (male Fire-Dragon); 843 or 462 or −310 — to — མེ་མོ་སྦྲུལ་ལོ་ (female Fire-Snake); 844 or 463 or −309

The Byzantine Empire (717) with its themes

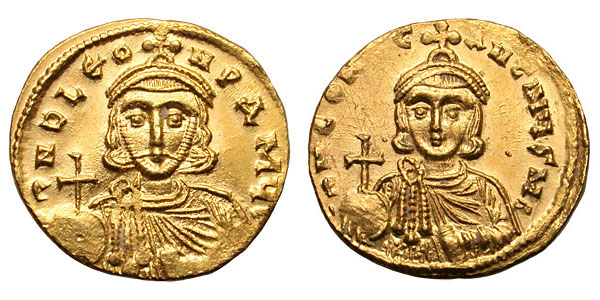
Leo III (left) and his son Constantine V

Year 717 (DCCXVII) was a common year starting on Friday of the Julian calendar. The denomination 717 for this year has been used since the early medieval period, when the Anno Domini calendar era became the prevalent method in Europe for naming years.

== Events ==
=== By place ===
==== Byzantine Empire ====
- March 25 – Emperor Theodosios III is deposed after a reign of 1 year and 10 months. He is succeeded by the 32-year-old Leo III the Isaurian, a general (strategos) of the Anatolic Theme (modern Turkey). Theodosios and his son enter the clergy, and he probably becomes bishop of Ephesus. Leo brings an end to the Twenty Years' Anarchy in the Byzantine Empire, which marks the beginning of the so-called Isaurian Dynasty.
- Arab–Byzantine War: Muslim general Maslama ibn Abd al-Malik leads his army of 80,000 men from Pergamum to Abydos, where he crosses the Hellespont. To prevent interference by the Bulgars, or by any Byzantine forces in Thrace, he sends part of his army to a covering position near Adrianople; with his main body, Maslama builds siege lines to blockade Constantinople, which is protected by the massive Theodosian Walls.
- August 15 – Siege of Constantinople: Maslama begins a combined land and sea effort to capture Constantinople. The capital controls the Bosporus, access between the Mediterranean and Black Sea, and is defended by a garrison of roughly 25,000 men. Leo III orders the granaries be restocked and siege engines installed. The Arab besiegers are suffering immense losses due to disease, and from attrition of siege warfare.
- September 1 – A Muslim armada, consisting of 1,800 ships commanded by Admiral Suleiman, sails into the Sea of Marmara and drops anchor below the sea walls of Constantinople, to supply their forces ashore. Leo III orders the Byzantine fleet to sally forth from their protected harbors with Greek fire, setting alight the thickly-packed Muslim ships. Many vessels burst into flames, while others collide with each other before sinking.
- Fall – Basil Onomagoulos, Byzantine official, declares himself rival emperor in Sicily after the news arrives that Constantinople has fallen to an Arab siege. Leo III dispatches a chartoularios named Paul, with imperial instructions for the Byzantine army on the island. Basil is arrested and executed; his head is sent to Leo, while the other rebels are mutilated and exiled.

==== Western Europe ====
- March 21 – Battle of Vincy: Charles Martel invades Neustria and defeats the forces of King Chilperic II at Vincy, near Cambrai. He pursues him and his mayor of the palace Ragenfrid to Paris, before turning back to deal with his stepmother Plectrude at Cologne, to turn over half the wealth of his late father Pepin of Herstal. Charles allows both Plectrude and his nephew Theudoald (who at eleven was still a little child) to live (a gesture uncommon for the time), and obliges her to accept his sovereignty.
- Charles Martel consolidates his power, proclaims Clotaire IV king of Austrasia in opposition to Chilperic, and deposes Rigobert, bishop of Reims, replacing him with Milo. He marches against Radbod, king (or duke) of the Frisians, and pushes him back into his territory (later part of the Netherlands). Charles sends the Saxons back over the Weser River, and secures the Rhine border—in the name of Clotaire.
- Paolo Lucio Anafesto dies after a 20-year reign, and is succeeded by Marcello Tegalliano as the second doge of the Republic of Venice.

==== Arabian Empire ====
- Caliph Sulayman ibn Abd al-Malik dies after a 2-year reign, and is succeeded by his cousin Umar II. During his rule he grants tax exemption, and tries to reorganize the Umayyad finances.
- A Muslim expedition under Al-Hurr ibn Abd al-Rahman al-Thaqafi cross the Pyrenees into Aquitanian territory, leading a small raiding party into Septimania (Southern France).

==== Asia ====
- December 24 – A destructive earthquake, with six months of aftershocks, affects Syria and Mesopotamia.
- Hoshi Ryokan, the world's second-longest surviving hotel, is established in Japan (approximate date).

=== By topic ===
==== Religion ====
- Nechtan mac Der-Ilei, king of the Picts, expels the monks from the island of Iona (Scotland).

== Births ==
- Childeric III, king of the Franks (d. 754)
- Elipando, Spanish archbishop and theologian
- Gummarus, Frankish noblemen (d. 774)
- Princess Inoe of Japan (d. 775)
- Rabia Basri, Muslim Sufi mystic and saint (d. 801)

== Deaths ==
- December 30 – Egwin of Evesham, bishop of Worcester
- Basil Onomagoulos, Byzantine usurper
- Eadwulf I, king of Northumbria
- Isonokami no Maro, Japanese statesman (b. 640)
- Paolo Lucio Anafesto, doge of Venice
- Plectrude, consort of Pepin of Herstal
- Sulayman ibn Abd al-Malik, Muslim caliph (b. 674)
- Theobald, duke of Bavaria (or 719)
- Winnoc, Welsh abbot (or 716)
