= 695 =

Calendar year

695 in various calendars
Gregorian calendar	695; DCXCV
Ab urbe condita	1448
Armenian calendar	144; ԹՎ ՃԽԴ
Assyrian calendar	5445
Balinese saka calendar	616–617
Bengali calendar	101–102
Berber calendar	1645
Buddhist calendar	1239
Burmese calendar	57
Byzantine calendar	6203–6204
Chinese calendar	甲午年 (Wood Horse); 3392 or 3185 — to — 乙未年 (Wood Goat); 3393 or 3186
Coptic calendar	411–412
Discordian calendar	1861
Ethiopian calendar	687–688
Hebrew calendar	4455–4456
- Hindu calendars
Vikram Samvat	751–752
Shaka Samvat	616–617
Kali Yuga	3795–3796
Holocene calendar	10695
Iranian calendar	73–74
Islamic calendar	75–76
Japanese calendar	Shuchō 10 (朱鳥１０年)
Javanese calendar	587–588
Julian calendar	695; DCXCV
Korean calendar	3028
Minguo calendar	1217 before ROC 民前1217年
Nanakshahi calendar	−773
Seleucid era	1006/1007 AG
Thai solar calendar	1237–1238
Tibetan calendar	ཤིང་ཕོ་རྟ་ལོ་ (male Wood-Horse); 821 or 440 or −332 — to — ཤིང་མོ་ལུག་ལོ་ (female Wood-Sheep); 822 or 441 or −331

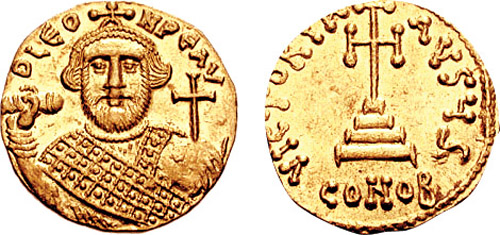
Emperor Leontios of Byzantium (695–698)

Year 695 (DCXCV) was a common year starting on Friday of the Julian calendar. The denomination 695 for this year has been used since the early medieval period, when the Anno Domini calendar era became the prevalent method in Europe for naming years.

== Events ==
=== By place ===
==== Byzantine Empire ====
- The population of Byzantium revolts under Leontios, the strategos (military governor) of the Anatolic Theme, and proclaims him emperor. Justinian II is deposed and his nose is cut off (leading to his subsequent nickname of "the Slit-nosed"). He is exiled to Cherson (Crimea), and begins to plot an attempt to retake the throne.

==== Britain ====
- September 6 – King Wihtred of Kent, who maintains Kentish independence against the growing expansion of Mercia, issues one of the earliest known law codes of Britain.
- King Aldfrith of Northumbria marries Princess Cuthburh, sister of King Ine of Wessex (approximate date).

==== Central America ====
- June 15 – Uaxaclajuun Ub'aah K'awiil ("Eighteen Rabbit") becomes the new ruler of the Mayan city state of Copán in Honduras upon the death of Chan Imix K'awiil, and rules until his death in 736.
- The Mayan city state of Tikal defeats Calakmul in what is now Guatemala, ending a centuries-long rivalry, but ushering in another century of warfare that ultimately leads to both cities' abandonment in the 9th century.

==== Europe ====
- Childebert III succeeds Clovis IV as sole king of the Franks. He is the son of Theuderic III and becomes a puppet—a roi fainéant—of Pepin of Herstal, mayor of the palace of Austrasia.
- Pepin institutes his son Drogo as mayor of the palace of Burgundy. His younger son Grimoald II becomes mayor of the palace of Neustria.
- The Saxons defeat the Bructeri between the Lippe and the Ruhr, and occupy Westphalia in Germany (approximate date).

=== By topic ===
==== Religion ====
- November 21 – Willibrord, Northumbrian missionary, becomes the first bishop of Utrecht (Netherlands). He returns to Frisia to preach, and builds numerous churches (approximate date).
- Willibrord establishes a Benedictine training centre for priests and young noblemen. This seminary later becomes Utrecht University.
- Suitbert, Anglo-Saxon missionary, founds a monastery at Kaiserswerth (near Düsseldorf) in Germany (approximate date).

== Births ==
- Fujiwara no Maro, Japanese statesman (d. 737)
- Herlindis of Maaseik, Frankish abbess (approximate date)
- Kibi no Makibi, Japanese scholar (d. 775)
- Muhammad ibn al-Qasim, Umayyad general (d. 715)
- Ōtomo no Koshibi, Japanese general (d. 777)
- Emperor Shang of Tang, Chinese ruler (or 698)
- Theophilus of Edessa, Greek astrologer (d. 785)
- Zayd ibn Ali, Arab imam and grandson of Husayn ibn Ali (d. 740)

== Deaths ==
- Ado, duke of Friuli (Northern Italy)
- Ansbert of Rouen, Frankish bishop
- Chan Imix K'awiil, Mayan ruler (ajaw)
- Sæbbi, king of Kent (approximate date)
- Stephen the Persian, chief eunuch and sakellarios of the Byzantine Empire under Justinian II
