= 868 =

Calendar year

868 in various calendars
- Gregorian calendar: 868; DCCCLXVIII
- Ab urbe condita: 1621
- Armenian calendar: 317; ԹՎ ՅԺԷ
- Assyrian calendar: 5618
- Balinese saka calendar: 789–790
- Bengali calendar: 274–275
- Berber calendar: 1818
- Buddhist calendar: 1412
- Burmese calendar: 230
- Byzantine calendar: 6376–6377
- Chinese calendar: 丁亥年 (Fire Pig); 3565 or 3358 — to — 戊子年 (Earth Rat); 3566 or 3359
- Coptic calendar: 584–585
- Discordian calendar: 2034
- Ethiopian calendar: 860–861
- Hebrew calendar: 4628–4629
- Hindu calendars
- Vikram Samvat: 924–925
- Shaka Samvat: 789–790
- Kali Yuga: 3968–3969
- Holocene calendar: 10868
- Iranian calendar: 246–247
- Islamic calendar: 253–255
- Japanese calendar: Jōgan 10 (貞観１０年)
- Javanese calendar: 765–766
- Julian calendar: 868; DCCCLXVIII
- Korean calendar: 3201
- Minguo calendar: 1044 before ROC 民前1044年
- Nanakshahi calendar: −600
- Seleucid era: 1179/1180 AG
- Thai solar calendar: 1410–1411
- Tibetan calendar: མེ་མོ་ཕག་ལོ་ (female Fire-Boar); 994 or 613 or −159 — to — ས་ཕོ་བྱི་བ་ལོ་ (male Earth-Rat); 995 or 614 or −158

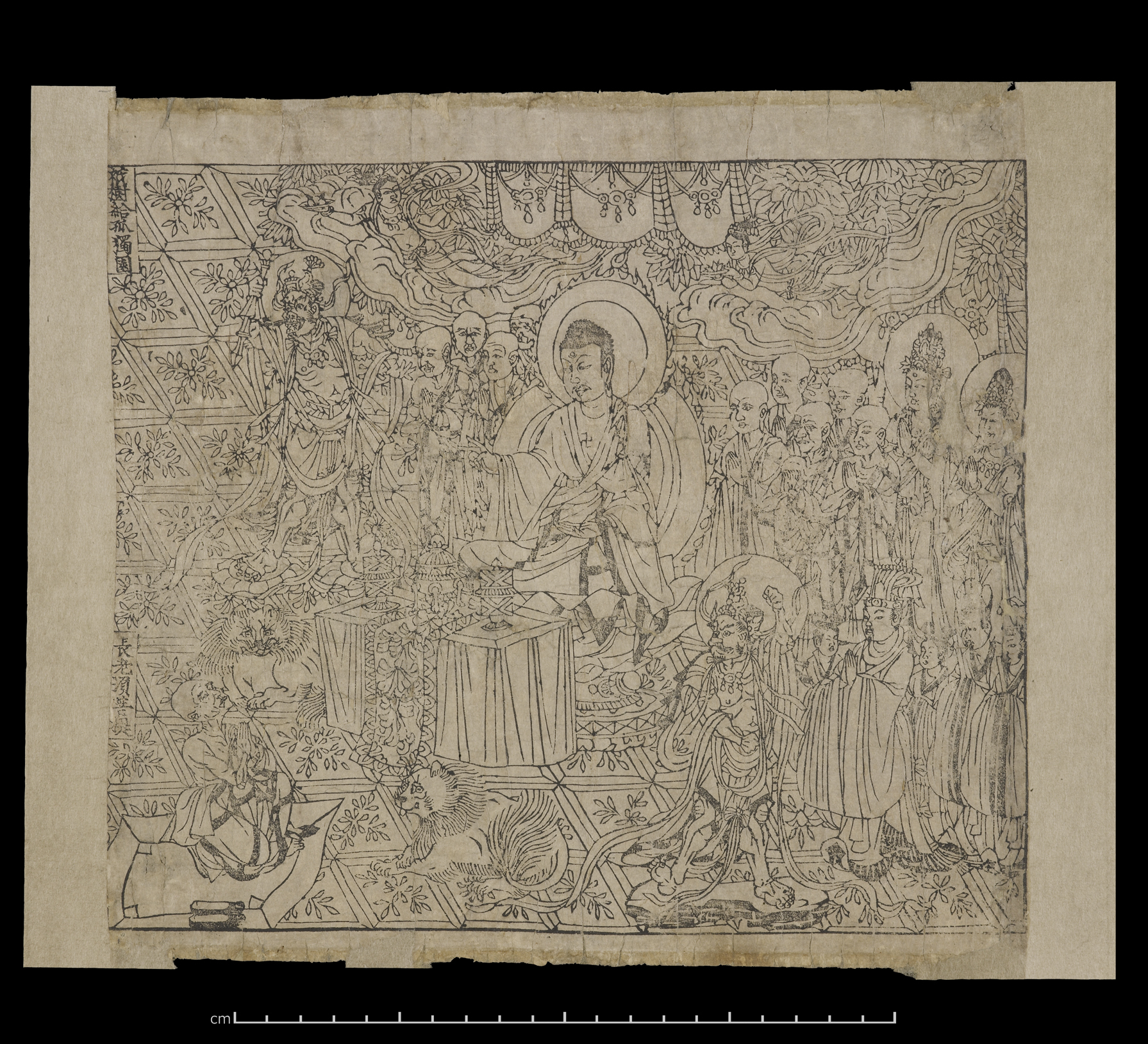
First printed copy of the Diamond Sūtra

Year 868 (DCCCLXVIII) was a leap year starting on Thursday of the Julian calendar.

== Events ==
=== By place ===
==== Europe ====
- King Charles the Bald meets his brother Louis the German at Metz. They agree to a partition of Lotharingia, which belonged to former emperor Lothair I (now in possession of his sons Lothair II and Louis II).
- Salomon, duke ('king') of Brittany, leads a joint campaign against the Loire Vikings. He is forced to defend southeastern Brittany unaided, and mobilizes levies raised at Poitiers to defeat the Vikings.
- Al-Andalus: The city of Mérida rises against the Umayyad rule. Emir Muhammad I regains control, and has the walls of the city destroyed. He supports the rival creation of Badajoz in retaliation.
- The County of Portugal is established around the town of Portus Cale (present-day Porto) by Vímara Peres, an Asturian nobleman, after the reconquest from the Moors of the region north of the Douro River.
- Ratramnus, a Frankish monk and abbot of Corbie Abbey, writes Contra Graecorum Opposita.

==== Britain ====
- Alfred the Great marries Ealhswith (a daughter of Æthelred, known as Mucel, an ealdorman of the Gaini). He supports his brother Æthelred I, in his choice to form an alliance with Mercia.
- King Burgred of Mercia appeals to Æthelred I for help in resisting the Great Heathen Army. The Danes occupy Nottingham, and stay through the winter without any serious opposition.
- King Áed Findliath drives the invading Danes and Norwegians out of Ireland, after defeating them at the Battle of Killineery.

==== Africa ====
- September 15 – Ahmad ibn Tulun, a Turkish general, is sent to Egypt as governor, by the Abbasid caliph Al-Mu'tazz. He becomes the founder of the Tulunid Dynasty (until 905).
- Muslim Arab forces under Muhammad II, emir of the Aghlabid Dynasty (modern Tunisia), conquer the island of Malta and raid into the mainland of Italy.

==== Asia ====
- May 11 – The earliest extant printed book, an illustrated scroll of the Diamond Sutra ("Perfection of Wisdom"), unearthed at Dunhuang (Western China), is produced.

== Births ==
- Ch'oe Ŏn-wi, Korean minister and calligrapher (d. 944)
- Muhammad ibn Dawud al-Zahiri, Muslim theologian (d. 909)
- Théodrate of Troyes, Frankish queen (d. 903)
- Xu Jie, Chinese officer and chancellor (d. 943)

== Deaths ==
- Ali al-Hadi, tenth Shia Imam
- Al-Jahiz, Afro-Muslim scholar and writer (b. 776)
- Bugha al-Sharabi, Turkish military leader
- Conwoïon, Breton abbot (approximate date)
- Minamoto no Makoto, Japanese prince (b. 810)
- Muzahim ibn Khaqan, Muslim governor
- Stephania, wife of Adrian II
- Theotgaud, archbishop of Trier
- Yang Shou, chancellor of the Tang Dynasty
- Yu Xuanji, Chinese poet (or 869)
