= 716 =

Calendar year

716 in various calendars
Gregorian calendar	716; DCCXVI
Ab urbe condita	1469
Armenian calendar	165; ԹՎ ՃԿԵ
Assyrian calendar	5466
Balinese saka calendar	637–638
Bengali calendar	122–123
Berber calendar	1666
Buddhist calendar	1260
Burmese calendar	78
Byzantine calendar	6224–6225
Chinese calendar	乙卯年 (Wood Rabbit); 3413 or 3206 — to — 丙辰年 (Fire Dragon); 3414 or 3207
Coptic calendar	432–433
Discordian calendar	1882
Ethiopian calendar	708–709
Hebrew calendar	4476–4477
- Hindu calendars
Vikram Samvat	772–773
Shaka Samvat	637–638
Kali Yuga	3816–3817
Holocene calendar	10716
Iranian calendar	94–95
Islamic calendar	97–98
Japanese calendar	Reiki 2 (霊亀２年)
Javanese calendar	609–610
Julian calendar	716; DCCXVI
Korean calendar	3049
Minguo calendar	1196 before ROC 民前1196年
Nanakshahi calendar	−752
Seleucid era	1027/1028 AG
Thai solar calendar	1258–1259
Tibetan calendar	ཤིང་མོ་ཡོས་ལོ་ (female Wood-Hare); 842 or 461 or −311 — to — མེ་ཕོ་འབྲུག་ལོ་ (male Fire-Dragon); 843 or 462 or −310

Map of Frisia (modern Netherlands) in 716

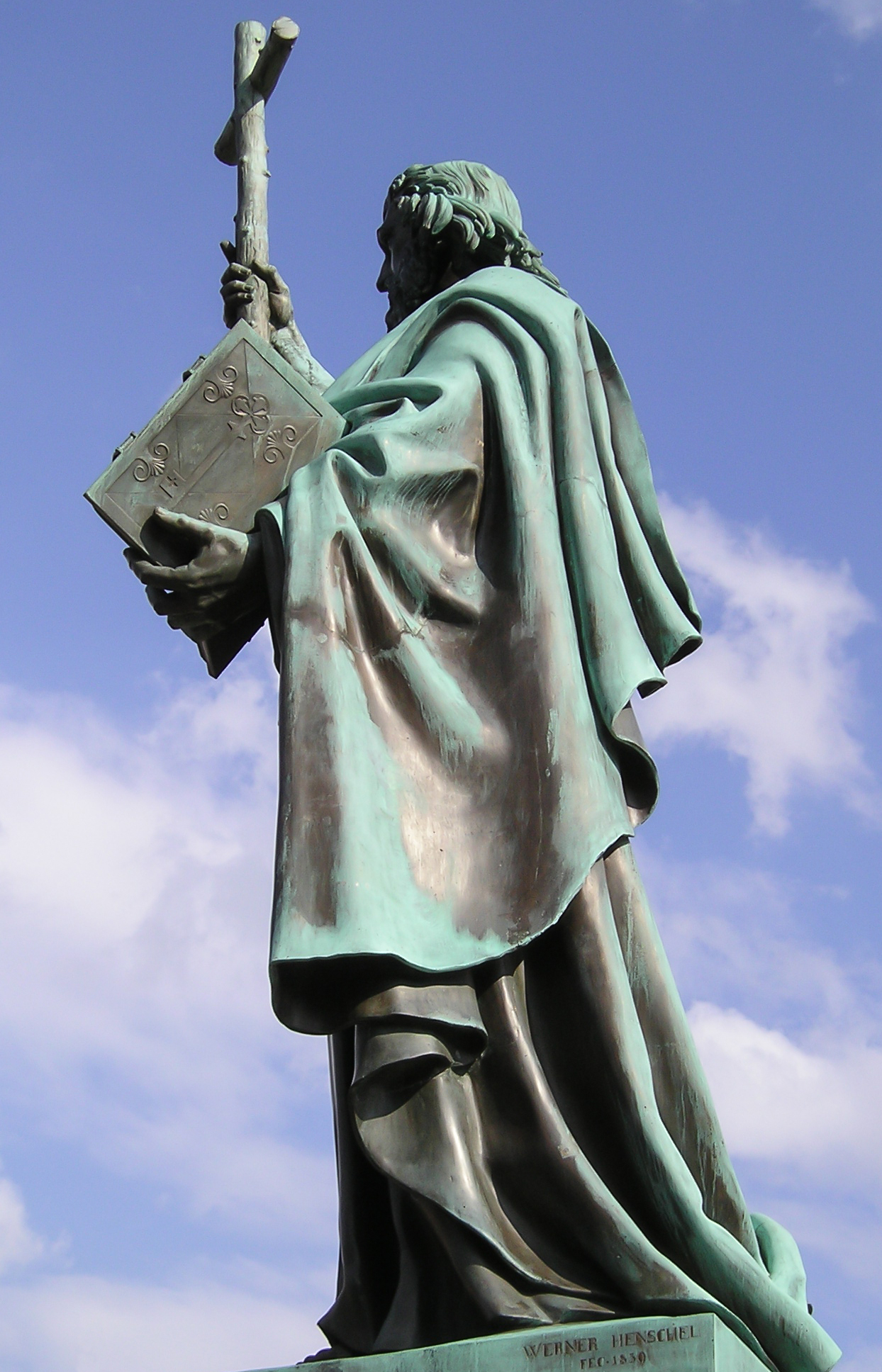
Statue of Boniface (c. 675–754)

Year 716 (DCCXVI) was a leap year starting on Wednesday of the Julian calendar, the 716th year of the Common Era (CE) and Anno Domini (AD) designations, the 716th year of the 1st millennium, the 16th year of the 8th century, and the 7th year of the 710s decade. The denomination 716 for this year has been used since the early medieval period, when the Anno Domini calendar era became the prevalent method in Europe for naming years.

== Events ==
=== Byzantine Empire ===
- Arab-Byzantine Wars: Umayyad Caliph Sulayman ibn Abd Al-Malik begins the preparations for his campaign on Constantinople; he orders new ships be built in the port-cities in Palestine, Egypt & Ifriqiya. General Umar ibn Hubayra raids southern Anatolia by sea and conquers Lycia, where another Arab fleet joins him, and they spend winter. As the navy advances, Sulayman sends land armies into Anatolia, which settle at Caesarea.
- Emperor Theodosios III concludes a peace treaty with Kormesiy, son of Tervel of Bulgaria, in an effort to secure support against the Arab invasion in Anatolia (modern Turkey). The treaty recognizes the Bulgarian borders, including the newly gained lands of Zagore (see 705). Theodosios agrees to pay annual tribute, and exchange refugees charged with conspiracy against the legal ruler. Goods can only be imported or exported with a state seal. Bulgarian merchants gain official access to the trade market in Constantinople.

==== Europe ====
- Battle of Cologne: Charles Martel, mayor of the palace of Austrasia, is defeated by the Neustrians under King Chilperic II and his mayor Ragenfrid near Cologne (now part of Germany), who have invaded Austrasia to impose their will on the competing Frankish factions of Theudoald and Plectrude, the child grandson (and designated heir) and widow respectively of Pepin of Herstal. Simultaneously, Radbod, king (or duke) of the Frisians, attacks Austrasia and allies with the Neustrians. Charles is forced to flee into the mountains of the Eifel (Ardennes).
- Battle of Amblève: Charles Martel defeats his Neustrian and Frisian rivals near Amel (modern-day Belgium). His forces attack the army of Chilperic II and his allies, as they return triumphantly from Cologne. According to the Annals of Metz, Charles uses a feigned retreat to destroy his foes while they are resting, and recovers much of the ransom paid by Plectrude to Chilperic. He will remain undefeated until his death 25 years later.

==== Britain ====
- Prince Æthelbald returns from Crowland Fens to Mercia, and seizes the throne after the death of his cousin King Ceolred, who had driven him into exile (see 709). He gains hegemony over London, Essex, and all of the English Midlands. By 731, Æthelbald will have subjugated all provinces south of the Humber River under his overlordship.
- King Osred I of Northumbria is killed in battle, possibly by the Picts in Manau Gododdin (Scotland). He is succeeded by his distant cousin, Coenred.

==== Arabian Empire ====
- Abd al-Aziz ibn Musa, governor of Al-Andalus (modern Spain), is assassinated on order of Caliph Sulayman ibn Abd al-Malik. He is succeeded by his cousin Ayyub ibn Habib al-Lakhmi, who becomes interim "protector" (wali) for 6 months, and moves the capital to Córdoba, until replaced by Al-Hurr ibn Abd al-Rahman al-Thaqafi.

==== Asia ====
- Qapaghan Khan, ruler (khagan) of the Second Turkic Khaganate (Central Asia), is killed during a campaign against his rival Toquz Oghuz. His severed head is sent to Chang'an, capital of the Tang dynasty. Qapaghan is succeeded by his son Inel Khagan.

=== By topic ===
==== Religion ====
- Boniface, Anglo-Saxon missionary, leaves England and travels to Frisia (the western parts of the modern-day Netherlands) to assist Willibrord, bishop of Utrecht, in his work to convert the pagan Frisians.

== Births ==
- Carloman, Frankish mayor of the palace (approximate date)
- Fujiwara no Kiyonari, Japanese nobleman (d. 777)
- Fujiwara no Yoshitsugu, Japanese statesman (d. 777)
- Hiltrud, duchess regent of Bavaria (approximate date; d. 754)
- Sufyan al-Thawri, Muslim scholar and jurist (d. 778)

== Deaths ==
- July 13 – Rui Zong, emperor of the Tang dynasty (b. 662)
- Abd al-Aziz ibn Musa, Arab general (or 718)
- Ceolfrith, Anglo-Saxon abbot
- Ceolred, king of Mercia
- Coenred, king of Mercia
- Musa ibn Nusayr, Arab general (b. 640)
- Osred I, king of Northumbria
- Qapaghan Khan, ruler (khagan) of the Turkic Khaganate
- Theodo II, duke of Bavaria (approximate date)
- Winnoc, Welsh abbot (or 717)
