= 810 =

Calendar year

810 in various calendars
- Gregorian calendar: 810; DCCCX
- Ab urbe condita: 1563
- Armenian calendar: 259; ԹՎ ՄԾԹ
- Assyrian calendar: 5560
- Balinese saka calendar: 731–732
- Bengali calendar: 216–217
- Berber calendar: 1760
- Buddhist calendar: 1354
- Burmese calendar: 172
- Byzantine calendar: 6318–6319
- Chinese calendar: 己丑年 (Earth Ox); 3507 or 3300 — to — 庚寅年 (Metal Tiger); 3508 or 3301
- Coptic calendar: 526–527
- Discordian calendar: 1976
- Ethiopian calendar: 802–803
- Hebrew calendar: 4570–4571
- Hindu calendars
- Vikram Samvat: 866–867
- Shaka Samvat: 731–732
- Kali Yuga: 3910–3911
- Holocene calendar: 10810
- Iranian calendar: 188–189
- Islamic calendar: 194–195
- Japanese calendar: Daidō 5 / Kōnin 1 (弘仁元年)
- Javanese calendar: 706–707
- Julian calendar: 810; DCCCX
- Korean calendar: 3143
- Minguo calendar: 1102 before ROC 民前1102年
- Nanakshahi calendar: −658
- Seleucid era: 1121/1122 AG
- Thai solar calendar: 1352–1353
- Tibetan calendar: ས་མོ་གླང་ལོ་ (female Earth-Ox); 936 or 555 or −217 — to — ལྕགས་ཕོ་སྟག་ལོ་ (male Iron-Tiger); 937 or 556 or −216

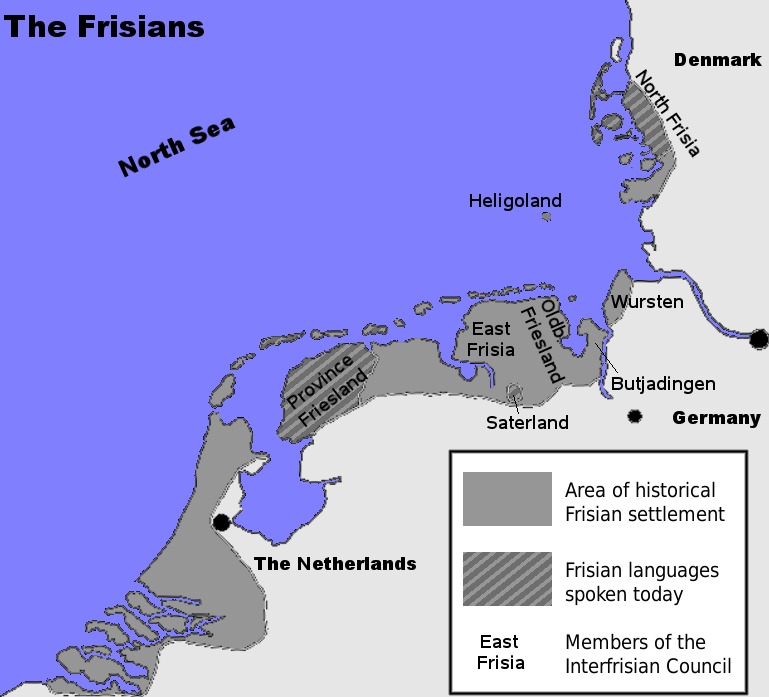
Frisian settlement area (Frisian coast)

Year 810 (DCCCX) was a common year starting on Tuesday of the Julian calendar.

== Events ==
=== By place ===
==== Byzantine Empire ====
- Spring – The Venetian dukes change sides again, submitting to King Pepin, under the authority of his father Charlemagne, who then proceeds to take Venice. Emperor Nikephoros I sends a Byzantine fleet to Dalmatia, prompting Pepin to withdraw to the mainland. A legate is dispatched to Venice, where he deposes the turncoat dukes, before continuing on to Aachen, to negotiate a peace with Charlemagne. Charlemagne recognises Byzantine dominance over Venice and Dalmatia in the Adriatic Sea.

==== Europe ====
- King Godfred of the Danes leads 200 Viking ships to plunder the Frisian coast, and forces the merchants to pay 100 pounds of silver. He claims Northern Frisia as Danish territory.
- Godfred is killed by one of his housecarls, and is succeeded by Hemming. According to Notker of Saint Gall, the bodyguard who murdered Godfred is possibly one of his sons.
- Al-Andalus (modern Spain): The city of Mérida rises up against the Emirate of Córdoba.

==== Asia ====
- In Japan, in the abdicated emperor Heizei's name, a high-ranked female courtier Fujiwara no Kusuko (藤原薬子), and her brother Nakanari organize an attempted rebellion, but their forces are defeated. Kusuko dies in poison, and her brother is executed. Heizei takes the tonsure, and becomes a Buddhist monk.

=== By topic ===
==== Religion ====
- Tikal Temple III, also known as the Temple of the Jaguar Priest, is constructed in Tikal National Park (modern Guatemala).
- The Book of Kells (also known as the Book of Colomba), an illuminated manuscript, is completed by Celtic monks (approximate date).

== Births ==
- July 19 – Muhammad al-Bukhari, Persian Islamic scholar (d. 870)
- July 27 – Xuān Zong, emperor of the Tang Dynasty (d. 859)
- Abbas ibn Firnas, Muslim physician and inventor (d. 887)
- Anastasius, antipope of Rome (approximate date)
- Bertharius, Benedictine abbot and poet (approximate date)
- Engelram, Frankish chamberlain (approximate date)
- Gérard II, Frankish nobleman (approximate date)
- Halfdan the Black, Norwegian nobleman (approximate date)
- Kassia, Byzantine abbess and hymnographer (approximate date)
- Kenneth MacAlpin, king of Scotland (d. 858)
- Louis the German, king of East Francia (approximate date)
- Minamoto no Makoto, Japanese prince (d. 868)
- Photius I, patriarch of Constantinople (approximate date)
- Seishi, empress of Japan (d. 879)

== Deaths ==
- July 8 – Pippin of Italy, son of Charlemagne
- Æthelburh, Anglo-Saxon abbess
- Abul-Abbas, Asian elephant given to Charlemagne
- Bello of Carcassonne, Frankish nobleman
- Eardwulf, king of Northumbria (approximate date)
- Eochaid mac Fiachnai, king of Ulaid (Ireland)
- Fujiwara no Nakanari, Japanese nobleman (b. 764)
- Gisela, Frankish abbess (b. 757)
- Godfred, king of the Danes
- Ismail ibn Ibrahim, Muslim scholar (b. 756)
- Liu Ji, general of the Tang Dynasty (b. 757)
- Owain ap Maredudd, king of Dyfed (Wales)
- Rotrude, Frankish princess, daughter of Charlemagne
- Thrasco, Obotrite prince
- Vojnomir, duke of Lower Pannonia (approximate date)
- Wu Shaocheng, general of the Tang Dynasty (b. 750)
