= 820 =

Calendar year

820 in various calendars
- Gregorian calendar: 820; DCCCXX
- Ab urbe condita: 1573
- Armenian calendar: 269; ԹՎ ՄԿԹ
- Assyrian calendar: 5570
- Balinese saka calendar: 741–742
- Bengali calendar: 226–227
- Berber calendar: 1770
- Buddhist calendar: 1364
- Burmese calendar: 182
- Byzantine calendar: 6328–6329
- Chinese calendar: 己亥年 (Earth Pig); 3517 or 3310 — to — 庚子年 (Metal Rat); 3518 or 3311
- Coptic calendar: 536–537
- Discordian calendar: 1986
- Ethiopian calendar: 812–813
- Hebrew calendar: 4580–4581
- Hindu calendars
- Vikram Samvat: 876–877
- Shaka Samvat: 741–742
- Kali Yuga: 3920–3921
- Holocene calendar: 10820
- Iranian calendar: 198–199
- Islamic calendar: 204–205
- Japanese calendar: Kōnin 11 (弘仁１１年)
- Javanese calendar: 716–717
- Julian calendar: 820; DCCCXX
- Korean calendar: 3153
- Minguo calendar: 1092 before ROC 民前1092年
- Nanakshahi calendar: −648
- Seleucid era: 1131/1132 AG
- Thai solar calendar: 1362–1363
- Tibetan calendar: ས་མོ་ཕག་ལོ་ (female Earth-Boar); 946 or 565 or −207 — to — ལྕགས་ཕོ་བྱི་བ་ལོ་ (male Iron-Rat); 947 or 566 or −206

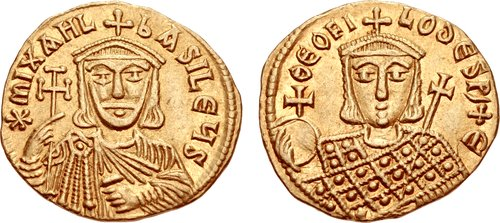
Emperor Michael II and his son Theophilos

Year 820 (DCCCXX) was a leap year starting on Sunday of the Julian calendar.

== Events ==
=== By place ===
==== Abbasid Caliphate ====
- Abbasid caliph Al-Ma'mun appoints Isa ibn Yazid al-Juludi as Abbasid governor of Yemen, for a few months.
- Caliph Al-Ma'mun appoints Hisn ibn al-Minhal as Abbasid governor of Yemen, for a few months.
- Caliph Al-Ma'mun appoints Ibrahim al-Ifriqi as Abbasid governor of Yemen. He remains in office until 821.
- Caliph al-Ma'mun appoints Abu Nasr ibn al-Sari as Abbasid governor of Egypt.

==== Byzantine Empire ====
- December 25 – Emperor Leo V (the Armenian) is assassinated by conspirators in the Hagia Sophia, at Constantinople. Though unarmed, he fights back fiercely but dies of his wounds. He is succeeded by Michael II, the commander of the palace guard (excubitores). Leo's family (including his mother and his wife Theodosia) are exiled to monasteries in Princes' Islands.

==== Ireland ====
- Fedelmid mac Crimthainn assumes the kingship as ruler of Munster (modern Ireland).

==== China ====
- Emperor Xian Zong dies from poisoning (due to medicines), after a 14-year reign. He is succeeded by his son Mu Zong, as ruler of the Tang dynasty.

== Births ==
- Adalbert I, Frankish margrave (approximate date)
- Adelaide of Tours, Frankish noblewoman (approximate date)
- Álmos, military leader (gyula) of the Hungarians (approximate date)
- Anandavardhana, Indian philosopher (d. 890)
- Ashot I ("the Great"), king of Armenia (approximate date)
- Buhturi, Syrian poet (d. 897)
- Godfrid Haraldsson, Danish Viking king (approximate date)
- Grimbald, Frankish Benedictine monk (d. 901)
- Hucbert, Frankish nobleman (d. 864)
- Ibn Khordadbeh, Persian geographer (approximate date)
- Qusta ibn Luqa, Syrian Melkite physician (d. 912)
- Ranulf I of Aquitaine, Frankish nobleman (d. 866)
- Rhodri the Great, king of Gwynedd (Wales) (approximate date)

== Deaths ==
- September 14, Li Yong, chancellor of the Tang dynasty
- December 25, Leo V, emperor of the Byzantine Empire (b. 775)
- Adi Shankara, Indian philosopher and theologian (b. 788)
- Causantín mac Fergusa, king of the Picts
- Huangfu Bo, chancellor of the Tang dynasty
- Lupo III, duke of Gascony (approximate date)
- Muhammad ibn Idris al-Shafi‘i, Muslim imam (b. 767)
- Olcobhar mac Cummuscach, abbot of Clonfert
- Song Ruoxin, Chinese scholar and poet (b. 768)
- Tnúthgal mac Donngaile, king of Munster
- Tutu Chengcui, eunuch and advisor of the Tang dynasty
- Wang Chengzong, general of the Tang dynasty
- Xian Zong, emperor of the Tang dynasty (b. 778)
