= 829 =

Calendar year

829 in various calendars
Gregorian calendar	829; DCCCXXIX
Ab urbe condita	1582
Armenian calendar	278; ԹՎ ՄՀԸ
Assyrian calendar	5579
Balinese saka calendar	750–751
Bengali calendar	235–236
Berber calendar	1779
Buddhist calendar	1373
Burmese calendar	191
Byzantine calendar	6337–6338
Chinese calendar	戊申年 (Earth Monkey); 3526 or 3319 — to — 己酉年 (Earth Rooster); 3527 or 3320
Coptic calendar	545–546
Discordian calendar	1995
Ethiopian calendar	821–822
Hebrew calendar	4589–4590
- Hindu calendars
Vikram Samvat	885–886
Shaka Samvat	750–751
Kali Yuga	3929–3930
Holocene calendar	10829
Iranian calendar	207–208
Islamic calendar	213–214
Japanese calendar	Tenchō 6 (天長６年)
Javanese calendar	725–726
Julian calendar	829; DCCCXXIX
Korean calendar	3162
Minguo calendar	1083 before ROC 民前1083年
Nanakshahi calendar	−639
Seleucid era	1140/1141 AG
Thai solar calendar	1371–1372
Tibetan calendar	ས་ཕོ་སྤྲེ་ལོ་ (male Earth-Monkey); 955 or 574 or −198 — to — ས་མོ་བྱ་ལོ་ (female Earth-Bird); 956 or 575 or −197

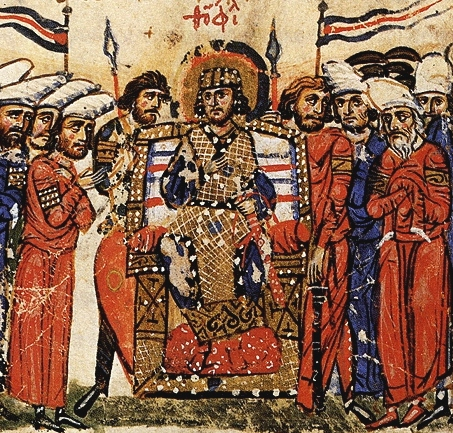
Theophilos is crowned Byzantine Emperor

Year 829 (DCCCXXIX) was a common year starting on Friday of the Julian calendar.

== Events ==
=== By place ===
==== Byzantine Empire ====
- October 2 – Emperor Michael II dies after an 8-year reign in Constantinople, and is succeeded by his 16-year-old son Theophilos, as sole emperor of the Byzantine Empire. He continues his father's ideology of iconoclasm.
- October – Battle of Thasos: Saracens from the newly founded Emirate of Crete almost annihilate the Byzantine fleet at Thasos, close to the coast of Thrace. The Cyclades and other islands in the Aegean Sea are pillaged.

==== Europe ====
- Emperor Louis the Pious appoints his 6-year-old son Charles (by his second wife Judith) as ruler of the Frankish subkingdom Alamannia, enraging his eldest son and co-emperor Lothair I, who begins an insurrection.
- Viking chieftain Halfdan the Black becomes king of Agder (modern Norway). He expands his realm through military conquest and political negotiations, dividing the kingdom of Vestfold with his half-brother Olaf.
- Giustiniano Participazio, doge of Venice, dies after a 2-year reign, and is succeeded by his younger brother Giovanni Participazio. He continues the work of Giustiniano, in construction of St. Mark's Basilica.

==== Britain ====
- King Egbert of Wessex invades Mercia, ousts his rival Wiglaf, and attempts to rule directly from Wessex. He is recognized as overlord (bretwalda) of other English kingdoms.
- Winter – Battle of the River Dore: Egbert of Wessex leads his army against the Northumbrians as far as Dore, where he clashes with King Eanred of Northumbria.

==== Egypt ====
- The Nile River freezes over.

==== China ====
- The Bai kingdom of Nanzhao captures the city of Chengdu, in Sichuan Province.

=== By topic ===
==== Religion ====
- Ansgar, Frankish abbot of Corvey (modern Westphalia), is appointed missionary to Sweden by Louis the Pious, at the request of the Swedish king Björn at Haugi.
- The city of Wiesbaden (Germany) is first mentioned by Einhard, biographer of former emperor Charlemagne (approximate date).

== Births ==
- September 8 – Ali al-Hadi, 10th Shia Imam (approximate date)
- Al-Nasa'i, Muslim scholar and hadith compiler (approximate date)
- Lu Yan, chancellor of the Tang dynasty (d. 874)
- Yahya I, Muslim sultan (d. 864)

== Deaths ==
- June 1 – Li Tongjie, general of the Tang dynasty
- July 30 – Shi Xiancheng, general of the Tang dynasty
- October 2 – Michael II, emperor of the Byzantine Empire (b. 770)
- Abu al-Razi Muhammad, Muslim governor
- Cináed mac Mugróin, king of Uí Failghe
- Cui Zhi, chancellor of the Tang dynasty (b. 772)
- Giustiniano Participazio, doge of Venice
- Leibulf of Provence, Frankish nobleman
- Li Yi, Chinese poet (or 827)
- Li You, general of the Tang dynasty
- Muiredach mac Ruadrach, king of Leinster
- 'Umayr ibn al-Walid, Muslim governor
- Wei Chuhou, chancellor of the Tang dynasty (b. 773)
- Zheng Yin, chancellor of the Tang dynasty (b. 752)
