= Les Rues-des-Vignes =

- Commune
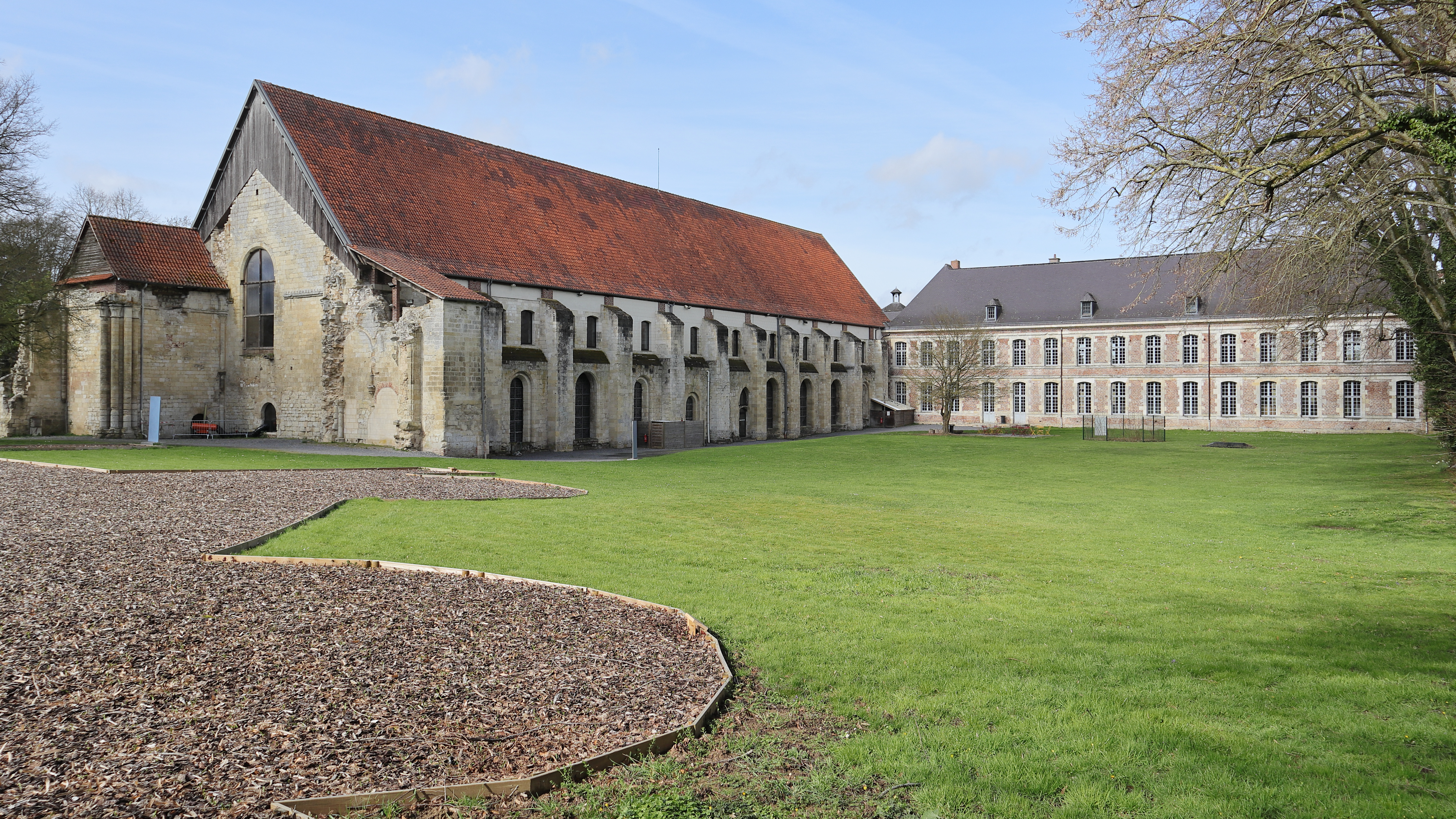
- The Vaucelles abbey

- Coat of arms
- Location of Les Rues-des-Vignes
- Location within France Location within Hauts-de-France
- Coordinates: 50°05′43″N 3°14′25″E
- Country: France
- Region: Hauts-de-France
- Department: Nord
- Arrondissement: Cambrai
- Canton: Le Cateau-Cambrésis
- Intercommunality: CA Cambrai

Government
  - Mayor (2020–2026): Marc Langlais
- Area^{1}: 17.85 km^{2} (6.89 sq mi)
- Elevation: 103 m (338 ft)
- Highest elevation: 146 m (479 ft)
- Lowest elevation: 62 m (203 ft)
- Population (2023): 737
  - Density: 41.3/km^{2} (107/sq mi)
- Time zone: UTC+01:00 (CET)
  - Summer (DST): UTC+02:00 (CEST)
- INSEE/Postal code: 59517 /59258
- ^{1} French Land Register data, which excludes lakes, ponds, glaciers > 1 km^{2} (0.386 sq mi or 247 acres) and river estuaries.

Les Rues-des-Vignes (French pronunciation: [le ʁy de viɲ]; called Vinchy in the Middle Ages) is a commune in the Nord department in northern France.

Vinchy was the site of a famous battle of the then-rising Charles Martel in spring 717.

== See also ==
- Communes of the Nord department
