= 723 =

Calendar year

723 in various calendars
- Gregorian calendar: 723; DCCXXIII
- Ab urbe condita: 1476
- Armenian calendar: 172; ԹՎ ՃՀԲ
- Assyrian calendar: 5473
- Balinese saka calendar: 644–645
- Bengali calendar: 129–130
- Berber calendar: 1673
- Buddhist calendar: 1267
- Burmese calendar: 85
- Byzantine calendar: 6231–6232
- Chinese calendar: 壬戌年 (Water Dog); 3420 or 3213 — to — 癸亥年 (Water Pig); 3421 or 3214
- Coptic calendar: 439–440
- Discordian calendar: 1889
- Ethiopian calendar: 715–716
- Hebrew calendar: 4483–4484
- Hindu calendars
- Vikram Samvat: 779–780
- Shaka Samvat: 644–645
- Kali Yuga: 3823–3824
- Holocene calendar: 10723
- Iranian calendar: 101–102
- Islamic calendar: 104–105
- Japanese calendar: Yōrō 7 (養老７年)
- Javanese calendar: 616–617
- Julian calendar: 723; DCCXXIII
- Korean calendar: 3056
- Minguo calendar: 1189 before ROC 民前1189年
- Nanakshahi calendar: −745
- Seleucid era: 1034/1035 AG
- Thai solar calendar: 1265–1266
- Tibetan calendar: ཆུ་ཕོ་ཁྱི་ལོ་ (male Water-Dog); 849 or 468 or −304 — to — ཆུ་མོ་ཕག་ལོ་ (female Water-Boar); 850 or 469 or −303

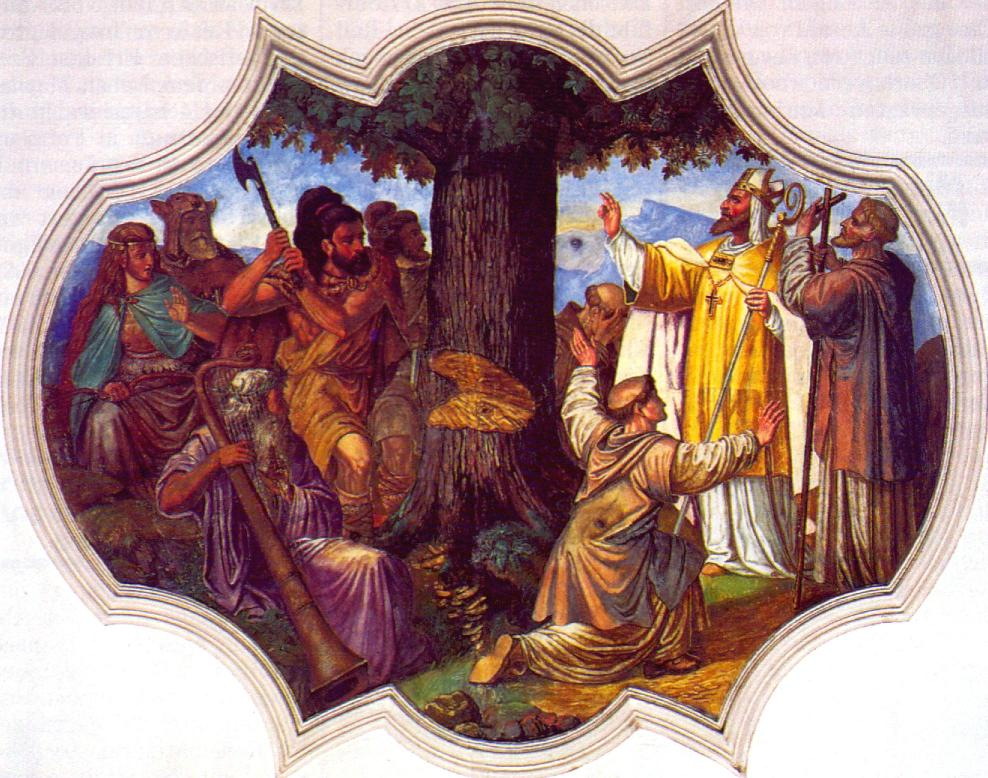
Boniface fells Thor's Oak in Hesse (1737)

Year 723 (DCCXXIII) was a common year starting on Friday of the Julian calendar. The denomination 723 for this year has been used since the early medieval period, when the Anno Domini calendar era became the prevalent method in Europe for naming years.

== Events ==
=== By place ===
==== Asia ====
- Gunakamadeva, Lichhavi ruler (rajah), founds the city of Kathmandu (modern Nepal). During his reign, he transforms the agrarian society to an industrial city trading between India and Tibet.

=== By topic ===
==== Religion ====
- Boniface, Anglo-Saxon missionary, fells Thor's Oak (a sacred tree) near Fritzlar in Hesse, marking the decisive event in the Christianization of the northern Germanic tribes (approximate date).
- Boniface makes Büraburg, a fortified Frankish settlement, his temporary religious base.

== Births ==
- Arbeo, bishop of Freising (approximate date)
- Isonokami no Yakatsugu, Japanese nobleman (d. 781)

== Deaths ==
- October 3 – Elias I of Antioch, Syriac Orthodox Patriarch of Antioch.
- Adalbert, duke of Alsace
- Fachtna mac Folachtan, Irish abbot
- Ō no Yasumaro, Japanese nobleman
