= Nuada ua Bolcain =

Irish abbot

Nuada ua Bolcain (died 776) was Abbot of Tuam.

ua Bolcain is the first recorded abbot of Tuam after Jarlath. There is some ambiguity as to his status, as he is listed as abbot of Tuaim Daolann, but this seems to be a contraction of Tuaim Dhá Ghualann, the correct form of the placename.

Because the abbatial succession at Tuam is only partially preserved, it is not known who was his direct predecessor or successor.

In Irish naming conventions, ua Bolcain is not a surname, instead indicating descent as a grandson of a person named Bolcain. Nothing else appears to be known of Nuada.

Events which occurred in Connacht, Ireland and Europe during his lifetime included:

- 742 - Birth of Charlemagne, death of Irish philosopher and friend of Adomnán, Cú Cummne
- 749 - Tuathlaithe, daughter of Cathal, wife of the King of Leinster, died.
- 751 - Fearghus, son of Ceallach, King of Connaught, died. Battle of Bealach Cro.
- 755 - Abd-ar-Rahman I lands in Spain; Bishop Eutighern murdered in the church of Bridget at Kildare.
- 763 - Ciniod succeeds Bridei V as king of the Picts.
- 767 - Deaths of King Duibhinrecht of Connaught and King Conchubhar mac Cumasgach of Aidhne.
- 774 - Death of Moenan mac Cormac, Abbot of Cathair Fursa, in France.
- 775 - The battle of Uilleann Guaire. Death of Constantine V.

Preceded by Jarlath	Abbot of Tuam ? - 776	Succeeded by Feardomhnach
