= Feardomhnach =

Feardomhnach of Tuam, died 777.

Feardomhnach may have been the successor of Nuada ua Bolcain as Abbot of Tuam, though he is not explicitly listed as such. Nothing else seems to be known of him. Because the abbatical succession at Tuam is only partly preserved, the next known abbot was listed over one hundred years later.

Events in Ireland and Europe in the year of Feardomhnach's death included:

- Charlemagne defeats the Saxons led by Widukind.
- The battle of Cuirreach between the Uí Failghe and Laigin.
- Artghal, son of Cathal, King of Connaught, took the pilgrim's staff, and went to Hi (Iona) on his pilgrimage.

Preceded by Nuada ua Bolcain?	Abbot of Tuam; 776? - 777	Succeeded by Cormac mac Ciaran
