= Fujiwara no Kiyonari =

Fujiwara no Kiyonari 藤原清成
- Born: 716
- Died: 777
- Family: Fujiwara Shikike
- Father: Fujiwara no Umakai

Fujiwara no Kiyonari (藤原 清成; 716 – 777) was a Japanese noble of the Nara period. He was the third son of the sangi Fujiwara no Umakai, the founder of the Fujiwara Shikike. He held no court ranks or titles.

== Genealogy ==
- Father: Fujiwara no Umakai
- Mother: Takahashi no Aneko (高橋阿禰娘), daughter of Takahashi no Kasa (高橋笠)
- Wife: daughter of Hata no Asamoto (秦朝元)
  - Son: Fujiwara no Tanetsugu (737-785)
- Other children:
  - Fujiwara no Yasutsugu (藤原安継), possibly instead a son of Tanetsugu
  - Fujiwara no Masako (藤原正子), court lady of Emperor Kanmu
