= Ruyuan (abbess) =

Ruyuan (Chinese: 如願, 700-775 CE) was a Chinese Buddhist abbess and master, lüshi.

She was a member of the Li family of Longxi, one of the five most important families under the Tang dynasty. She became a novice at the age of nine, a nun at twenty, and an abbess at the temple convent of Zhenhua Temple (真化寺) in Chang'an. She was a master within the Chan Buddhism and famed as a lecturer and organizer of religious rituals with a great circle of followers. She was favored by Emperor Daizong of Tang, who enlisted her to officiate at religious ceremonies at court and give lessons to his empress, wives and concubines. In particular, Ruyuan was noted as the teacher of Consort Dugu.
