= George the Standard-Bearer =

Archbishop of Mytilene from 804–815

Saint George the Standard-Bearer
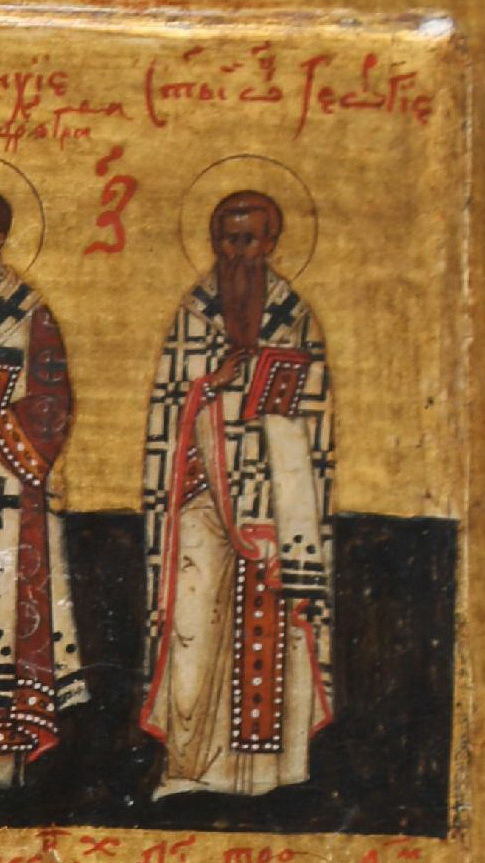

Archbishop of Mytilene
- Born: c. 776
- Died: 7 April 821 (aged 44–45)
- Venerated in: Eastern Orthodox Church
- Feast: 7 April

Saint George the Standard-Bearer (Greek: Ἅγιος Γεώργιος ὁ Σημειοφόρος), also known as Saint George the Confessor (c. 776 – 7 April 821), was the Archbishop of Mytilene from 804 until his deposition in 815. He is venerated as a saint in the Eastern Orthodox Church and his feast day is 7 April.

== Biography ==
George was born c. 776 into a wealthy family on the coast of Anatolia, opposite the island of Lesbos. Following his parents' death, George donated his inheritance to the poor and, at age eighteen, became a monk at a local monastery, where he resided for two years. He later moved to the island of Lesbos and became an ascetic. George gained renown for his piety and after the death of the bishop of the island, was chosen by the people of Lesbos to succeed him, and was ordained Archbishop of Mytilene in 804.

In 813, during the reign of Emperor Michael I, George travelled to Constantinople to settle cases, but remained for a further two years at the request of Nikephoros, the Ecumenical Patriarch of Constantinople. At the onset of his reign, Leo V, Michael's successor, restored iconoclasm and began to persecute iconodules (supporters of religious images). In 815, George, alongside the Patriarch and others, approached the Emperor and petitioned an end to the persecution. Forthright in his criticism of the Emperor, George was flogged with a hundred lashes and exiled to a barren island in the Sea of Marmara. Leo V appointed an iconoclast by the name of Leo as George's successor as Archbishop of Mytilene.

Whilst in exile, George practised asceticism and survived on wild greens. Christians began to travel to the island to confess their sins, hear his teachings, and be healed. Several miracles are attributed to George during his exile, including the healing of a man possessed by a demon, a deaf person, a blind person, and others. George became known as a simeiophoros ("standard-bearer" or "wonder worker" in Greek). After six years in exile, George died on 7 April 821 and was buried on the island. A bright star is said to have shone over the city of Mytilene at the time of his death.

In 846–847, after the end of iconoclasm, George's remains were brought to Lesbos and buried at a location known as the Tria Kyparissia, near the Chapel of St John the Baptist. George's right hand was later moved to Mytilene in the eighteenth century.
