= Sigiburg =

Location in Dortmund, Germany

Coordinates: 51°25′12″N 7°29′13″E

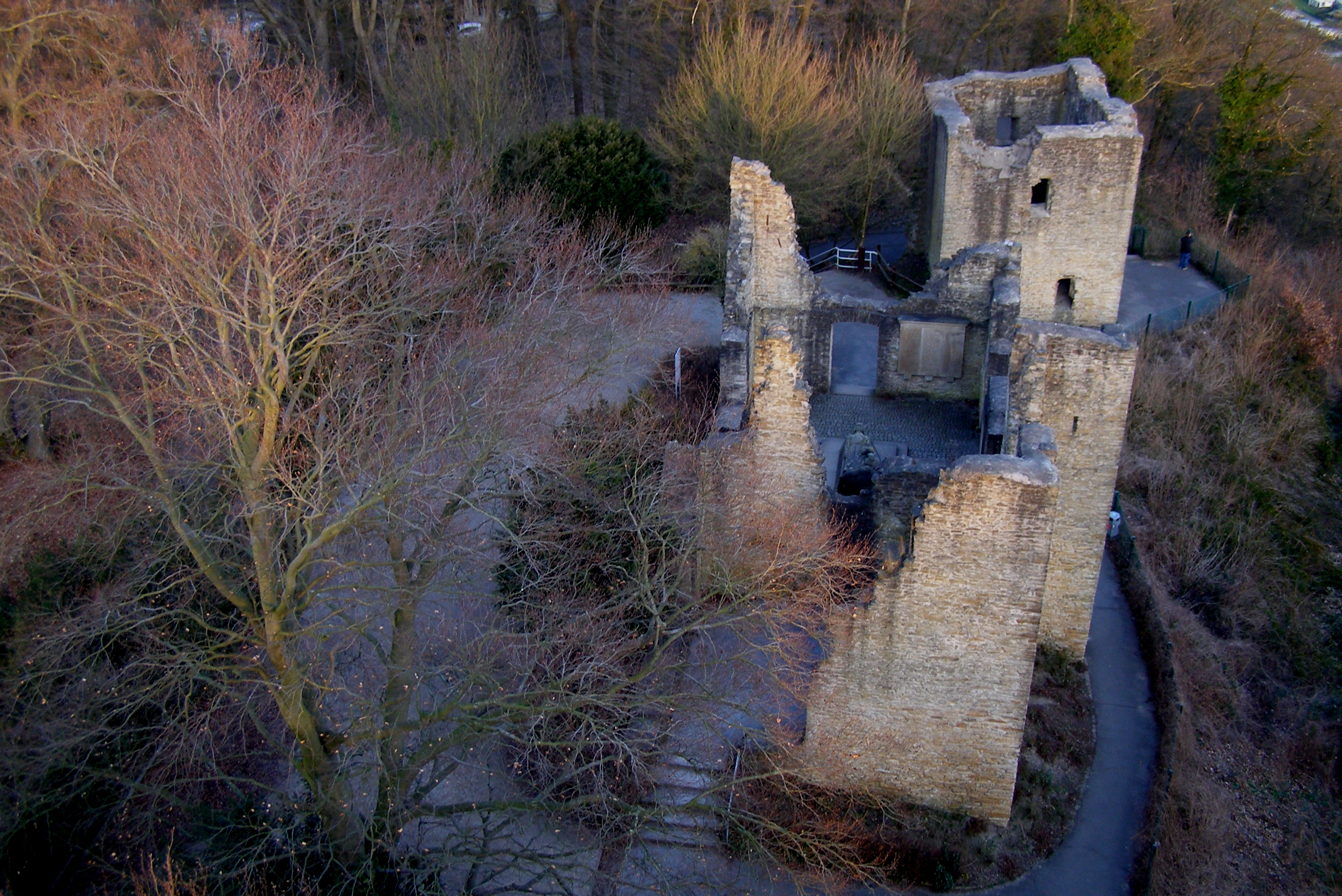
Ruin of Hohensyburg castle, on the site of the Sigiburg (view from the Vincke tower)

The Sigiburg was a Saxon hillfort in Western Germany, overlooking the River Ruhr near its confluence with the River Lenne.

The ruins of the later Hohensyburg castle now stand on the site, which is in Syburg, a neighbourhood in the Hörde district of Dortmund. Archaeological evidence suggests the site was occupied in the Neolithic era.

The hillfort was raised ca. 700 by Westphalian Saxons. During the Saxon Wars, it was taken by the Franks under Charlemagne in 772, retaken by the Saxons (possibly under Widukind) in 774, and taken again and refortified by Charlemagne in 775.
