= Arab Muslims =

Ethnic Arabs who adhere to Islam

ﺍﻟْمُسْلِمون ﺍﻟْﻌَﺮَﺏ

Regions with significant populations
- Arab League
- approx. 350+ million (2007)

Languages
- Arabic

Religion
- Sunni Islam (majority); Shia Islam (minority)

Related ethnic groups
- Arab Christians and other Arabs

Arab Muslims (Arabic: ﺍﻟْمُسْلِمون ﺍﻟْﻌَﺮَﺏ, romanized: al-Muslimūn al-ʿArab) are the Arabs who adhere to Islam. They are the largest subdivision of the Arab people and the largest ethnic group among Muslims globally, followed by Bengalis and Punjabis. Likewise, they comprise the majority of the population of the Arab world. Currently, around 93% of Arabs are Muslims, while the rest are mainly Arab Christians, as well as Druze and Baháʼís.

Although Arabs account for the largest ethnicity among the world's adherents of Islam, they are a minority in the Muslim world in terms of sheer numbers. Muhammad, the founder of Islam, was an ethnic Arab belonging to the Banu Hashim of the Quraysh, and most of the early Muslims were also Arabs.

== Ethnogenesis ==
They are descended from the early Arab tribes of the Levant, the Arabian Peninsula, and Mesopotamia who embraced Islam in the 7th century. The Arab identity can have ethnic, linguistic, cultural, historical, and nationalist aspects.

== Mashriq ==
The word Mashriq refers to the eastern part of the Arab world.

=== Arabian Peninsula ===
The seventh century saw the rise of Islam as the peninsula's dominant religion. The Islamic prophet Muhammad was born in Mecca in about 570 (53 BH) and first began preaching in the city in 610, but migrated to Medina in 622. From there, he and his companions united the tribes of Arabia under the banner of Islam and created a single Arab Muslim religious polity in the Arabian peninsula.

Muhammad established a new unified polity which, under the subsequent Rashidun and Umayyad caliphates, saw a century of rapid expansion of Arab power well beyond the Arabian peninsula in the form of a vast Muslim Arab Empire.

=== Levant ===
The Arabs of the Levant are traditionally divided into Qays and Yaman tribes, back to the pre-Islamic era and was based on tribal affiliations and geographic locations. They include Banu Kalb, Kinda, Ghassanids, and Lakhmids. On the eve of the Rashidun Caliphate's conquest of the Levant in the 7th century, Arab tribes largely migrated to the Levant and Upper Mesopotamia with the Muslim armies in the mid-7th century.

=== Egypt ===
The Arabs have inhabited the eastern Egypt Desert and the Sinai Peninsula for thousands of years, and were a part of the Nabatean Kingdom. The Muslim caliphate also allowed the migration of Arab tribes to Egypt. The Muslim governor of Egypt encouraged the migration of tribes from the Arabian Peninsula to Egypt to increase the spread of Islam and to strengthen his regime by enlisting warrior tribesmen to his military forces, encouraging them to bring their families and entire clans. The Fatimid era was the peak of Bedouin Arab tribal migrations to Egypt.

=== Sudan ===
In the 12th century, the Arab Ja'alin tribe migrated into Nubia and Sudan and formerly occupied the country on both banks of the Nile from Khartoum to Abu Hamad. They trace their lineage to Abbas, uncle of Muhammad. They are of Arab origin, but now of mixed blood mostly with Nilo-Saharans and Nubians. Other Arab tribes migrated into Sudan in the 12th century and intermarried with the indigenous populations, forming the Sudanese Arabs. In 1846, many Arab Rashaida migrated from Hejaz in present-day Saudi Arabia into what is now Eritrea and north-east Sudan after tribal warfare had broken out in their homeland. The Rashaida of Sudan and Eritrea live in close proximity with the Beja people. Large numbers of Bani Rasheed are also found on the Arabian Peninsula. They are related to the Banu Abs tribe.

== Maghreb ==
The word Maghreb refers to the western part of the Arab world, including a large portion of the Sahara Desert, but excluding Egypt and Sudan, which are considered to be located in the Mashriq — the eastern part of the Arab world.

Following the death of Muhammad in 632 (11 AH), Arabs aimed at geographically expanding their empire. They started conquering North Africa in 647, and by 709, all of North Africa was under Arab Muslim rule from Egypt to Morocco. North Africa was then divided into three main areas: Egypt with its governing center being Al-Fustat, Ifriqiya in Tunisia with its governing center being Kairouan, and the Maghreb (modern-day Algeria and Morocco), with its governing center being located in Fez. North Africa experienced three distinct invasions leading to the establishment of not only a new religion (Islam) but also a new language and norms that differed significantly from what was established by the indigenous inhabitants.

Arabic is the main language of the region, though each country (Libya, Tunisia, Morocco and Algeria) has its own dialects of the Tamazight languages and Arabic. Sunni Islam is the region’s main religion, and the Maliki Madhhab is the main Islamic school of thought followed by North Africans. The vast majority of North Africans identify as Arabs or Arab Muslims. Therefore, North Africans perceive themselves as part of the Mediterranean and the Middle East rather than Africa where they are geographically located.

=== Berbers ===
Before the Arab-Islamic conquest took place, North Africa was mainly inhabited by Berbers. The Berbers were largely animists until Islam reached North Africa and they were either coerced or enticed into converting to Islam in a process known as Arabization and Islamization. Arabization refers to the process of acculturation in which the peoples of North Africa adopted the Arabic language in addition to various other aspects of Arab culture. Islamization refers to the process by which North Africans converted to Islam and thus became Muslims by faith. Though the majority of North Africans identify as Arabs today, a considerable number of the population perceive themselves as Berbers.

== Diaspora ==
A substantial number of Arab Muslims live outside their countries of origin. Arab Muslims comprise the majority of the Arab populations in Belgium, Canada, France, Germany, Indonesia, Iran, Israel, the Netherlands, Turkey, the United Kingdom, and the United States, whilst Arab Christians are the majority of the Arab populations in Argentina, Australia, Brazil, Chile, Colombia, Cuba, Greece, Haiti, Japan, Mexico, Paraguay, Uruguay, and Venezuela. Around a quarter of Arab Americans identify as Arab Muslims.

== See also ==
- Arab Christians
- Arab Jews
- Druze
- Qahtanite
- Baháʼí Faith
- Berbers

== Bibliography ==
- Ankerl, Guy (2000). Coexisting Contemporary Civilizations: Arabo-Muslim, Bharati, Chinese, and Western. Geneva: INU Press. ISBN 2-88155-004-5.
