= Hōki =

Period of Japanese history (770–781 CE)

Hōki (宝亀) was a Japanese era name (年号, nengō; "year name") after Jingo-keiun and before Ten'ō. This period spanned the years from October 770 through January 781. The reigning emperor was Kōnin-tennō (光仁天皇).

== Change of era ==
- 770 Hōki gannen (宝亀元年): The new era name was created to mark an event or series of events. The previous era ended and the new one commenced in Jingo-keiun 4, on the 18th day of the 8th month of 770.

== Events of the Hōki era ==
- 23 October 770 (Hōki 1, 1st day of the 10th month): The era name was changed to mark the beginning of Emperor Konin's reign.
- 778 (Hōki 9): The emperor granted Kashima-jinja a divine seal for use on documents.
- 28 August 779 (Hōki 10, 7th month): Fujiwara no Momokawa died at age 48.
- 781 (Hōki 12, 4th month ): The emperor abdicated in favor of his son, who would later come to be known as Emperor Kanmu. Emperor Kōnin's reign had lasted for 11 years.
- 781 (Hōki 12, 12th month): Kōnin died at the age of 73.

== Notes ==
Preceded by Jingo-keiun	Era or nengō Hōki; 770–781	Succeeded by Ten'ō
