= Rotrude =

Rotrude is a feminine given name of Germanic origin.

== Spellings ==
It has many spelling variants in the primary sources of the early Middle Ages, including:

- Chrotrud (Annales Mosellani)
- Chrotrudis (Annales Petaviani)
- Hroddrud
- Hrothrud (Annales Laureshamenses)
- Hrottrudis
- Hroderudis
- Hruoddrud (Annales Fuldenses)
- Hruodtrud (Annales Regni Francorum)
- Hurodrud (Vita Karoli Magni)
- Hruothruda (Annales Laurissenses minores)
- Rhodrud
- Rodruda
- Rotrud (Annales Bertiniani)
- Rotrudis
- Ruadruda
- Ruatrudis (Gesta abbatum Fontanellensium)
- Ruodthrud
- Ruodrud (Annales Quedlinburgenses)
- Ruotdrud (Annales Altahenses)
- Ruotrud (Chronicon Moissiacense)
- Rutruda

Theophanes the Confessor records the name in Greek as Erythro, meaning 'red', possibly an attempted translation.

== Notable people ==
- Rotrude of Hesbaye (died 724), wife of Charles Martel
- Rotrude (died 810), daughter of Charlemagne
- Rotrude (born c. 770), daughter of Tassilo III of Bavaria
- Rotrude (born 800), daughter of Louis the Pious
- Rotruda (fl. 865), daughter of Lothair I
- Rotrude, daughter of Charles the Bald
- Rotrude (born c. 910), daughter of Charles the Simple
- Rotruda of Pavia (fl. 945), mistress of King Hugh of Italy
