= December 26 =

December 26 this year in various calendars
- Saturday, 26 December 2026
Akan	Nwonamemene
Armenian	9 Arach 1476
Aztec	Huei Tozoztli 5, 13 Tecpatl
Babylonian	16 Kislimu, 2337 SE
Balinese pawukon	Menga, Beteng, Menala, Paing, Aryang, Saniscara of Warigadian, Uma, Tulus, Dewa
Bengali	11 Poush, BS 1433
Chinese	Yang Wood Dog・Stomach Mansion; Fire Horse Year, Month 11, Day 18 (Dongzhi, 10 days until Xiaohan)
Common Era	26 December 2026 CE
Coptic	17 Koiak, AM 1743
Egyptian	14 Pachon, 2775 NE
Ethiopian	17 Tākḫśāś, 2019 Amätä Məhrät
French Republican	Décade I, Quintidi de Nivôse de l'Année 235 de la République
Gregorian	26 December, AD 2026
Hebrew	16 Tevet, AM 5787
Hindu	Puṣya・Indra; Solar: 11 Pauṣa, 1948 SE; Lunisolar: Tr̥tīyā, Kṛishna pakṣa of Mārgaśīrṣa, 2083 VE; Rāudra・5127 KY・1,872,935
Icelandic	Laugardagur, 4 Mörsugur 2026
Islamic	16 Rajab, AH 1448 (using tabular method)
ISO week date	2026-W52-6
Japanese	18 Shimotsuki, Reiwa 8 (Tōji, 10 days until Shōkan)
Julian	13 December, AD 2026 (AM 7535)
Julian day	2461401
Korean	18 Jwidal, 4359 DE
Maya	13.0.14.3.18; 11 Kankin, 13 Etznab
Roman	Idibus Decembribus, MMDCCLXXIX AUC
Solar Hijri	5 Dey, SH 1405
Tibetan	18 mgo, me pho rta 2153 or 1772 or 1000

<<	December					>>
Su	Mo	Tu	We	Th	Fr	Sa
		1	2	3	4	5
6	7	8	9	10	11	12
13	14	15	16	17	18	19
20	21	22	23	24	25	26
27	28	29	30	31
2026

December 26 in recent years
2025 (Friday)
2024 (Thursday)
2023 (Tuesday)
2022 (Monday)
2021 (Sunday)
2020 (Saturday)
2019 (Thursday)
2018 (Wednesday)
2017 (Tuesday)
2016 (Monday)

December 26 is the 360th day of the year (361st in leap years) in the Gregorian calendar; five days remain until the end of the year.

== Events ==
=== Pre-1600 ===
- 795 – Election of Pope Leo III.
- 887 – Berengar I is elected as king of Italy by the lords of Lombardy. He is crowned with the Iron Crown of Lombardy at Pavia.
- 1481 – Battle of Westbroek: An army of 4,000 to 5,000 soldiers raised by David of Burgundy, Bishop of Utrecht, attacks an armed mob of people from nearby Utrecht who were trying to avenge the massacre of the inhabitants of Westbroek.

=== 1601–1900 ===
- 1704 – Second Battle of Anandpur: In the Second Battle of Anandpur, Aurangzeb's two generals, Wazir Khan and Zaberdast Khan executed two children of Guru Gobind Singh, Zorawar Singh aged eight and Fateh Singh aged five, by burying them alive into a wall.
- 1709 – The opera Agrippina by George Frideric Handel premiered in Venice.
- 1723 – Bach led the first performance of Darzu ist erschienen der Sohn Gottes, BWV 40, his first Christmas Cantata composed for Leipzig.
- 1776 – American Revolutionary War: In the Battle of Trenton, the Continental Army under General George Washington executes a successful surprise attack and defeats a garrison of Hessian forces serving Great Britain.
- 1790 – Louis XVI of France gives his public assent to Civil Constitution of the Clergy during the French Revolution.
- 1793 – Second Battle of Wissembourg: France defeats Austria.
- 1799 – Henry Lee III's eulogy to George Washington in congress declares him as "first in war, first in peace and first in the hearts of his countrymen".
- 1805 – Austria and France sign the Treaty of Pressburg.
- 1806 – Battles of Pultusk and Golymin: Russian forces hold French forces under Napoleon.
- 1811 – A theater fire in Richmond, Virginia kills 72 people, including the Governor of Virginia George William Smith and the president of the First National Bank of Virginia Abraham B. Venable.
- 1825 – Advocates of liberalism in Russia rise up against Czar Nicholas I in the Decembrist revolt, but are later suppressed.
- 1843 – The discovery of octonions by John T. Graves, who denoted them with a boldface **O**, was announced to his mathematician friend William Hamilton, discoverer of quaternions, in a letter on this date.
- 1860 – First Rules derby is held between Sheffield F.C. and Hallam F.C., the oldest football fixture in the world.
- 1861 – American Civil War: The Trent Affair: Confederate diplomatic envoys James Murray Mason and John Slidell are freed by the United States government, thus easing tensions between the U.S. and the United Kingdom.
- 1862 – American Civil War: The Battle of Chickasaw Bayou begins as Union General William T. Sherman starts landing his troops in an attempt to advance on Vicksburg, Mississippi.
- 1862 – Dakota War of 1862: The largest mass-hanging in U.S. history takes place in Mankato, Minnesota, where 38 Native American prisoners are hanged.
- 1871 – Thespis, the first Gilbert and Sullivan collaboration, debuts.
- 1898 – Marie and Pierre Curie announce the isolation of radium.

=== 1901–present ===
- 1919 – Babe Ruth of the Boston Red Sox is sold to the New York Yankees by owner Harry Frazee, allegedly establishing the Curse of the Bambino superstition.
- 1926 – World premiere of Sibelius's tone poem Tapiola.
- 1941 – U.S. President Franklin D. Roosevelt signs a bill establishing the fourth Thursday in November as Thanksgiving Day in the United States.
- 1941 – British Prime Minister Winston Churchill addresses a joint meeting of the U.S. Congress.
- 1943 – World War II: German warship Scharnhorst is sunk off Norway's North Cape after a battle against major Royal Navy forces.
- 1944 – World War II: George S. Patton's Third Army breaks the encirclement of surrounded U.S. forces at Bastogne, Belgium.
- 1948 – Cardinal József Mindszenty is arrested in Hungary and accused of treason and conspiracy.
- 1948 – The last Soviet troops withdraw from North Korea.
- 1963 – The Beatles' "I Want to Hold Your Hand" and "I Saw Her Standing There" are released in the United States, marking the beginning of Beatlemania on an international level.
- 1966 – The first Kwanzaa is celebrated by Maulana Karenga, the chair of Black Studies at California State University, Long Beach.
- 1968 – The Communist Party of the Philippines is established by Jose Maria Sison, breaking away from the Partido Komunista ng Pilipinas-1930.
- 1968 – Pan Am Flight 799 crashes during takeoff from Elmendorf Air Force Base, killing three.
- 1972 – Vietnam War: As part of Operation Linebacker II, 120 American B-52 Stratofortress bombers attacked Hanoi, including 78 launched from Andersen Air Force Base in Guam, the largest single combat launch in Strategic Air Command history.
- 1975 – Tu-144, the world's first commercial supersonic aircraft, surpassing Mach 2, goes into service.
- 1978 – The inaugural Paris-Dakar Rally begins.
- 1980 – Witnesses report the first of several sightings of unexplained lights near RAF Woodbridge, in Rendlesham Forest, Suffolk, England, United Kingdom, an incident called "Britain's Roswell".
- 1989 – United Express Flight 2415 crashes on approach to the Tri-Cities Airport in Pasco, Washington, killing all six people on board.
- 1991 – The Supreme Soviet of the Soviet Union meets and formally dissolves the Soviet Union, ending the Cold War.
- 1993 – Kuban Airlines Flight 5719 crashes during a go-around at Gyumri Shirak International Airport, killing 35 of the 36 people on board.
- 1994 – Four Armed Islamic Group hijackers seize control of Air France Flight 8969. When the plane lands at Marseille, a French Gendarmerie assault team boards the aircraft and kills the hijackers.
- 1998 – Iraq announces its intention to fire upon U.S. and British warplanes that patrol the northern and southern no-fly zones.
- 1999 – The storm Lothar sweeps across Central Europe, killing 137 and causing US$1.3 billion in damage.
- 2003 – The 6.6 M_{w} Bam earthquake shakes southeastern Iran with a maximum Mercalli intensity of IX (Violent), leaving more than 26,000 dead and 30,000 injured.
- 2004 – The 9.1–9.3 M_{w} Indian Ocean earthquake shakes northern Sumatra with a maximum Mercalli intensity of IX (Violent). One of the largest observed tsunamis, it affected coastal and partially mainland areas of Thailand, India, Sri Lanka, the Maldives, Malaysia, Myanmar, Bangladesh, and Indonesia; death toll is estimated at 227,898.
- 2004 – Orange Revolution: The final run-off election in Ukraine is held under heavy international scrutiny.
- 2006 – Two earthquakes in Hengchun, Taiwan measuring 7.0 and 6.9 on the moment magnitude scale kill two and disrupt telecommunications across Asia.
- 2012 – China opens the world's longest high-speed rail route, which links Beijing and Guangzhou.
- 2013 – An Irkut-Avia Antonov An-12 crashes on approach to Irkutsk Northwest Airport, killing all nine people on board.
- 2015 – A violent EF-4 tornado hits Garland, Texas, killing nine and injuring almost 500 others.
- 2021 – Three people are killed when a 14-year-old opens fire on civilians at a Texaco convenience store in Garland, Texas.
- 2025 – Israel recognises Somaliland as an independent state, becoming the first country to do so.

== Births ==
=== Pre-1600 ===
- 1194 – Frederick II, Holy Roman Emperor (died 1250)
- 1446 – Charles de Valois, Duke de Berry, French noble (died 1472)
- 1526 – Rose Lok, businesswoman and Protestant exile (died 1613)
- 1532 – Wilhelm Xylander, German scholar and academic (died 1576)
- 1536 – Yi I, Korean philosopher and scholar (died 1584)
- 1537 – Albert, Count of Nassau-Weilburg (died 1593)
- 1581 – Philip III, Landgrave of Hesse-Butzbach (died 1643)

=== 1601–1900 ===
- 1618 – Elisabeth of the Palatinate, German princess, philosopher, and Calvinist (died 1680)
- 1628 – John Page, English Colonial politician (died 1692)
- 1646 – Robert Bolling, English/English Colonial merchant and planter (died 1709)
- 1687 – Johann Georg Pisendel, German violinist and composer (died 1755)
- 1716 – Thomas Gray, English poet and scholar (died 1771)
- 1716 – Jean François de Saint-Lambert, French soldier and philosopher (died 1803)
- 1723 – Friedrich Melchior, Baron von Grimm, German-French author and playwright (died 1807)
- 1737 – Prince Josias of Saxe-Coburg-Saalfeld (died 1815)
- 1751 – Lord George Gordon, English lieutenant and politician (died 1793)
- 1751 – Clemens Maria Hofbauer, Austrian priest, missionary, and saint (died 1820)
- 1769 – Ernst Moritz Arndt, German writer and poet (died 1860)
- 1780 – Mary Somerville, Scottish mathematician, astronomer, and author (died 1872)
- 1782 – Philaret Drozdov, Russian metropolitan and saint (died 1867)
- 1785 – Étienne Constantin de Gerlache, Belgian lawyer and politician, 1st Prime Minister of Belgium (died 1871)
- 1791 – Charles Babbage, English mathematician and engineer, invented the Difference engine (died 1871)
- 1803 – Friedrich Reinhold Kreutzwald, Estonian physician and author (died 1882)
- 1819 – E. D. E. N. Southworth, American author and educator (died 1899)
- 1820 – Dion Boucicault, Irish actor and playwright (died 1890)
- 1837 – Morgan Bulkeley, American soldier and politician, 54th governor of Connecticut (died 1922)
- 1837 – George Dewey, American admiral (died 1917)
- 1852 – Johannes François Snelleman, Dutch zoologist, orientalist, and ethnographer (died 1938)
- 1853 – René Bazin, French author and academic (died 1932)
- 1854 – José Yves Limantour, Mexican financier and politician, Mexican Secretary of Finance (died 1935)
- 1859 – William Stephens, American lawyer and politician, 24th Governor of California (died 1944)
- 1863 – Charles Pathé, French record producer, co-founded Pathé Records (died 1957)
- 1864 – Yun Chi-ho, Korean activist and politician (died 1945)
- 1867 – Phan Bội Châu, Vietnamese activist (died 1940)
- 1869 – Mathieu Cordang, Dutch cyclist (died 1942)
- 1870 – Virginia Bolten, Argentine feminist and trade unionist (died 1960)
- 1872 – Norman Angell, English journalist, academic, and politician, Nobel Prize laureate (died 1967)
- 1873 – Thomas Wass, English cricketer (died 1953)
- 1874 – Khan Bahadur Ahsanullah, Bangladeshi theologian and academic (died 1965)
- 1883 – Maurice Utrillo, French painter (died 1955)
- 1885 – Bazoline Estelle Usher, African-American educator (died 1992)
- 1887 – Arthur Percival, English general (died 1966)
- 1888 – Marius Canard, French orientalist and historian (died 1982)
- 1889 – Ragnhild Kaarbø, Norwegian painter (died 1949)
- 1890 – Konstantinos Georgakopoulos, Greek lawyer and politician, Prime Minister of Greece (died 1973)
- 1890 – Percy Hodge, English runner (died 1967)
- 1891 – Henry Miller, American author and painter (died 1980)
- 1892 – Don Barclay, American actor and illustrator (died 1975)
- 1893 – Mao Zedong, Chinese politician, Chairman of the Chinese Communist Party (died 1976)
- 1894 – Jean Toomer, American author and poet (died 1967)
- 1900 – Evelyn Bark, leading member of the British Red Cross, first female recipient of the CMG (died 1993)

=== 1901–present ===
- 1901 – Elmar Muuk, Estonian linguist and author (died 1941)
- 1902 – Anatoli Lvovich Kaplan, Russian painter and sculptor (died 1980)
- 1903 – Elisha Cook, Jr., American actor (died 1995)
- 1904 – Alejo Carpentier, Swiss-Cuban musicologist and author (died 1980)
- 1905 – William Loeb III, American publisher (died 1981)
- 1907 – Albert Gore, Sr., American lawyer and politician (died 1998)
- 1908 – Ralph Hill, American runner (died 1994)
- 1909 – Matt Gordy, American pole vaulter (died 1989)
- 1910 – Imperio Argentina, Argentine-Spanish actress and singer (died 2003)
- 1910 – Marguerite Churchill, American actress (died 2000)
- 1912 – Arsenio Lacson, Filipino journalist and politician, Mayor of Manila (died 1962)
- 1913 – Frank Swift, English footballer and journalist (died 1958)
- 1914 – Richard Widmark, American actor (died 2008)
- 1915 – Rolf Botvid, Swedish actor and screenwriter (died 1998)
- 1918 – Olga Lopes-Seale, Guyanese-Barbadian singer and radio host (died 2011)
- 1918 – Georgios Rallis, Greek lieutenant and politician, 173rd Prime Minister of Greece (died 2006)
- 1921 – Steve Allen, American actor, singer, talk show host, and screenwriter (died 2000)
- 1921 – John Severin, American illustrator (died 2012)
- 1922 – Richard Mayes, English actor (died 2006)
- 1923 – Richard Artschwager, American painter, illustrator, and sculptor (died 2013)
- 1924 – Frank Broyles, American football player, coach, and sportscaster (died 2017)
- 1926 – Earle Brown, American composer (died 2002)
- 1927 – Denis Gifford, English journalist and historian (died 2000)
- 1927 – Alan King, American actor, producer, and screenwriter (died 2004)
- 1927 – Stu Miller, American baseball player (died 2015)
- 1927 – Denis Quilley, English actor (died 2003)
- 1928 – Martin Cooper, American engineer, invented the mobile phone
- 1929 – Kathleen Crowley, American actress (died 2017)
- 1929 – Régine Zylberberg, Belgian-French singer and actress (died 2022)
- 1930 – Jean Ferrat, French singer-songwriter and poet (died 2010)
- 1930 – Harry Gamble, American football player, coach, and manager (died 2014)
- 1930 – Donald Moffat, English-American actor (died 2018)
- 1933 – Caroll Spinney, American puppeteer and voice actor (died 2019)
- 1935 – Rohan Kanhai, Guyanese cricketer
- 1935 – Norm Ullman, Canadian ice hockey player
- 1936 – Kitty Dukakis, American author, First Lady of Massachusetts (died 2025)
- 1936 – Peep Jänes, Estonian architect
- 1936 – Trevor Taylor, English race car driver (died 2010)
- 1937 – John Horton Conway, English mathematician, known for Conway's Game of Life (died 2020)
- 1938 – Bahram Beyzai, Iranian director, screenwriter, and playwright (died 2025)
- 1938 – Robert Hamerton-Kelly, South African-American pastor, scholar, and author (died 2013)
- 1938 – Alamgir Kabir, Bangladeshi director, producer, and screenwriter (died 1989)
- 1938 – Mirko Kovač, Yugoslav-Croatian author, playwright, and screenwriter (died 2013)
- 1939 – Fred Schepisi, Australian director and screenwriter
- 1939 – Phil Spector, American singer-songwriter and producer (died 2021)
- 1940 – Edward C. Prescott, American economist and academic, Nobel Prize laureate (died 2022)
- 1940 – Ray Sadecki, American baseball player (died 2014)
- 1941 – Daniel Schmid, Swiss actor, director, and screenwriter (died 2006)
- 1942 – Vinicio Cerezo, Guatemalan politician, 28th President of Guatemala
- 1942 – Catherine Coulter, American author
- 1942 – Gray Davis, American captain, lawyer, and politician, 37th Governor of California
- 1944 – William Ayers, American academic and activist
- 1945 – John Walsh, American television host, producer, and activist, created America's Most Wanted
- 1946 – Alan Frumin, American lawyer and politician
- 1946 – Tiit Rosenberg, Estonian historian and academic
- 1947 – James T. Conway, American general
- 1947 – Jean Echenoz, French author
- 1947 – Carlton Fisk, American baseball player
- 1947 – Josef Janíček, Czech singer-songwriter, guitarist, and keyboard player
- 1947 – Liz Lochhead, Scottish poet and playwright
- 1947 – Richard Levis McCormick, American historian and academic
- 1948 – Candy Crowley, American journalist
- 1949 – José Ramos-Horta, East Timorese lawyer and politician, 2nd President of East Timor, Nobel Prize laureate
- 1950 – Raja Pervaiz Ashraf, Pakistani businessman and politician, 17th Prime Minister of Pakistan
- 1950 – Mario Mendoza, Mexican baseball player and manager
- 1953 – Leonel Fernández, Dominican lawyer and politician, 51st President of the Dominican Republic
- 1953 – Toomas Hendrik Ilves, Swedish-Estonian journalist and politician, 4th President of Estonia
- 1953 – Makis Katsavakis, Greek footballer and manager
- 1953 – Henning Schmitz, German drummer
- 1954 – Peter Hillary, New Zealand mountaineer and philanthropist
- 1954 – Ozzie Smith, American baseball player and sportscaster
- 1955 – Evan Bayh, American lawyer and politician, 46th Governor of Indiana
- 1956 – David Sedaris, American comedian, author, and radio host
- 1957 – Dermot Murnaghan, English-Northern Irish journalist and game show host (died 2026)
- 1958 – Adrian Newey, English aerodynamicist and engineer
- 1959 – Wang Lijun, Chinese police officer and politician
- 1959 – Kōji Morimoto, Japanese animator and director
- 1959 – Hans Nielsen, Danish motorcycle racer
- 1960 – Keith Martin Ball, American mathematician and academic
- 1960 – Ruud Kaiser, Dutch footballer and manager
- 1960 – Cem Uzan, Turkish businessman and politician
- 1961 – Andrew Lock, Australian mountaineer
- 1962 – James Kottak, American drummer (died 2024)
- 1962 – Mark Starr, English wrestler (died 2013)
- 1963 – Craig Teitzel, Australian rugby league player
- 1963 – Lars Ulrich, Danish-American drummer, songwriter, and producer
- 1964 – Elizabeth Kostova, American author
- 1966 – Jay Farrar, American singer-songwriter and guitarist
- 1966 – Tim Legler, American basketball player and sportscaster
- 1968 – Matt Zoller Seitz, American film critic and author
- 1969 – Isaac Viciosa, Spanish runner
- 1970 – James Mercer, American singer-songwriter and guitarist
- 1971 – Jared Leto, American actor and musician
- 1971 – Mika Nurmela, Finnish footballer
- 1971 – Tatiana Sorokko, Russian-American model and journalist
- 1972 – Gaby Colebunders, Belgian politician
- 1972 – Esteban Fuertes, Argentinian footballer
- 1972 – Robert Muchamore, English author
- 1973 – Paulo Frederico Benevenute, Brazilian footballer
- 1973 – Gianluca Faliva, Italian rugby player
- 1973 – Nobuhiko Matsunaka, Japanese baseball player
- 1973 – Steve Prescott, English rugby player (died 2013)
- 1974 – Joshua John Miller, American actor, director, and screenwriter
- 1975 – Chris Calaguio, Filipino basketball player
- 1975 – Marcelo Ríos, Chilean tennis player
- 1975 – María Vasco, Spanish race walker
- 1976 – Simon Goodwin, Australian footballer and coach
- 1977 – Fatih Akyel, Turkish footballer and manager
- 1977 – Adrienn Hegedűs, Hungarian tennis player
- 1978 – Karel Rüütli, Estonian lawyer and politician
- 1978 – Kaoru Sugayama, Japanese volleyball player
- 1979 – Fabián Carini, Uruguayan footballer
- 1979 – Chris Daughtry, American singer-songwriter and guitarist
- 1979 – Dimitry Vassiliev, Russian ski jumper
- 1979 – Craig Wing, Australian rugby player
- 1980 – Todd Dunivant, American soccer player
- 1980 – Ceylan Ertem, Turkish singer
- 1981 – Pablo Canavosio, Argentine-Italian rugby player
- 1981 – Omar Infante, Venezuelan baseball player
- 1982 – Kenneth Darby, American football player
- 1982 – Noel Hunt, Irish footballer
- 1982 – Aksel Lund Svindal, Norwegian skier
- 1983 – Jeroen Soete, Belgian politician
- 1983 – Yu Takahashi, Japanese singer-songwriter
- 1983 – Alexander Wang, American fashion designer
- 1984 – Ahmed Barusso, Ghanaian footballer
- 1984 – Leonardo Ghiraldini, Italian rugby player
- 1984 – Alex Schwazer, Italian race walker
- 1985 – Damir Markota, Croatian basketball player
- 1986 – Joe Alexander, American-Israeli basketball player
- 1986 – Kit Harington, English actor
- 1986 – Hugo Lloris, French footballer
- 1986 – Selen Soyder, Turkish actress and beauty queen
- 1987 – Oskar Osala, Finnish ice hockey player
- 1989 – Yohan Blake, Jamaican sprinter
- 1989 – Sofiane Feghouli, Algerian footballer
- 1989 – Tomáš Kundrátek, Czech ice hockey player
- 1990 – Denis Cheryshev, Russian footballer
- 1990 – Cory Jefferson, American basketball player
- 1990 – Aaron Ramsey, Welsh footballer
- 1991 – Brandon Scherff, American football player
- 1991 – Eden Sher, American actress
- 1991 – Trevor Siemian, American football player
- 1992 – Cecilia Costa Melgar, Chilean tennis player
- 1992 – Jade Thirlwall, English singer
- 1994 – Colby Cave, Canadian ice hockey player (died 2020)
- 1994 – Souleymane Coulibaly, Ivorian footballer
- 1997 – Tamara Zidanšek, Slovenian tennis player
- 2001 – Aleksej Pokuševski, Serbian basketball player
- 2002 – Josh Wilson-Esbrand, English footballer
- 2004 – Leo Carlsson, Swedish ice hockey player

== Deaths ==
=== Pre-1600 ===
- 268 – Dionysius, pope of the Catholic Church
- 418 – Zosimus, pope of the Catholic Church
- 831 – Euthymius of Sardis, Byzantine bishop and saint (born 754)
- 865 – Zheng, empress of the Tang Dynasty
- 893 – Masrur al-Balkhi, Abbasid general
- 1006 – Gao Qiong, Chinese general (born 935)
- 1191 – Reginald Fitz Jocelin, archbishop-elect of Canterbury
- 1302 – Valdemar, king of Sweden (born 1239)
- 1331 – Philip I, Prince of Taranto, titular Latin Emperor (born 1278)
- 1350 – Jean de Marigny, French archbishop
- 1352 – John, 3rd Earl of Kent, English politician (born 1330)
- 1360 – Thomas Holland, 1st Earl of Kent, English commander (born 1314)
- 1413 – Michele Steno, doge of Venice (born 1331)
- 1441 – Niccolò III d'Este, marquess of Ferrara
- 1458 – Arthur III, duke of Brittany (born 1393)
- 1476 – Galeazzo Maria Sforza, duke of Milan (born 1444)
- 1530 – Babur, Mughal emperor (born 1483)
- 1574 – Charles de Lorraine, French cardinal (born 1524)

=== 1601–1900 ===
- 1646 – Henri de Bourbon, prince of Condé (born 1588)
- 1731 – Antoine Houdar de la Motte, French author (born 1672)
- 1771 – Claude Adrien Helvétius, French philosopher and activist (born 1715)
- 1780 – John Fothergill, English physician and botanist (born 1712)
- 1784 – Seth Warner, American colonel (born 1743)
- 1786 – Gasparo Gozzi, Italian playwright and critic (born 1713)
- 1863 – Francis Caulfeild, 2nd Earl of Charlemont, Irish politician, Lord Lieutenant of Tyrone (born 1775)
- 1869 – Jean Léonard Marie Poiseuille, French physician and physiologist (born 1797)
- 1890 – Heinrich Schliemann, German archaeologist, businessman and author (born 1822)

=== 1901–present ===
- 1902 – Mary Hartwell Catherwood, American author and poet (born 1849)
- 1909 – Frederic Remington, American painter and illustrator (born 1861)
- 1923 – Dietrich Eckart, German journalist, poet, and politician (born 1868)
- 1925 – Jan Letzel, Czech architect, designed the Hiroshima Peace Memorial (born 1880)
- 1929 – Albert Giraud, Belgian poet (born 1860)
- 1931 – Melvil Dewey, American librarian and educator, created the Dewey Decimal Classification (born 1851)
- 1933 – Mary Ann Bevan, English nurse who, after developing acromegaly, toured the circus sideshow circuit as "the ugliest woman in the world" (born 1874)
- 1933 – Anatoly Lunacharsky, Russian journalist and politician (born 1875)
- 1933 – Henry Watson Fowler, English lexicographer and educator (born 1858)
- 1938 – Anscar Vonier, German Benedictine abbot in England (born 1875)
- 1959 – Jack Tresadern, English footballer and manager (born 1890)
- 1960 – Tetsuro Watsuji, Japanese historian and philosopher (born 1889)
- 1963 – Gorgeous George, American wrestler (born 1915)
- 1966 – Ina Boudier-Bakker, Dutch author (born 1875)
- 1966 – Herbert Otto Gille, German general (born 1897)
- 1966 – Guillermo Stábile, Argentinian footballer and manager (born 1905)
- 1968 – Weegee, Ukrainian-American photographer and journalist (born 1898)
- 1970 – Lillian Board, South African-English runner (born 1948)
- 1972 – Harry S. Truman, American colonel and politician, 33rd President of the United States (born 1884)
- 1973 – Harold B. Lee, American religious leader, 11th President of The Church of Jesus Christ of Latter-day Saints (born 1899)
- 1974 – Farid al-Atrash, Syrian-Egyptian singer-songwriter, oud player, and actor (born 1915)
- 1974 – Jack Benny, American comedian, vaudevillian, actor, and violinist (born 1894)
- 1974 – Frederick Dalrymple-Hamilton, Scottish admiral (born 1890)
- 1977 – Howard Hawks, American director and screenwriter (born 1896)
- 1980 – Tony Smith, American sculptor and educator (born 1912)
- 1980 – Richard Chase, American cannibalistic serial killer and necrophile (born 1950)
- 1981 – Amber Reeves, New Zealand-English author and scholar (born 1887)
- 1981 – Suat Hayri Ürgüplü, Turkish politician, Prime Minister of Turkey (born 1903)
- 1981 – Savitri, Indian actress, playback singer, dancer, director and producer (born 1936)
- 1983 – Hans Liska, Austrian-German artist (born 1907)
- 1986 – Elsa Lanchester, English-American actress (born 1902)
- 1987 – Dorothy Bliss, American invertebrate zoologist, curator at the American Museum of Natural History (born 1916)
- 1988 – Glenn McCarthy, American businessman, founded the Shamrock Hotel (born 1907)
- 1988 – Pablo Sorozábal, German-Spanish composer and conductor (born 1897)
- 1989 – Doug Harvey, Canadian ice hockey player and coach (born 1924)
- 1990 – Gene Callahan, American art director and production designer (born 1923)
- 1994 – Sylva Koscina, Italian actress (born 1933)
- 1997 – Cahit Arf, Turkish mathematician and academic (born 1910)
- 1997 – Cornelius Castoriadis, Greek economist and philosopher (born 1922)
- 1998 – Ram Swarup, Indian writer on Hindu philosophy and religion (born 1920)
- 1999 – Curtis Mayfield, American singer-songwriter and producer (born 1942)
- 1999 – Shankar Dayal Sharma, Indian academic and politician, 9th President of India (born 1918)
- 2000 – Jason Robards, American actor (born 1922)
- 2001 – Nigel Hawthorne, English actor (born 1929)
- 2002 – Herb Ritts, American photographer and director (born 1952)
- 2002 – Armand Zildjian, American businessman, founded the Avedis Zildjian Company (born 1921)
- 2003 – Virginia Coffey, American civil rights activist (born 1904)
- 2004 – Jonathan Drummond-Webb, South African surgeon and academic (born 1959)
- 2004 – Angus Ogilvy, English businessman (born 1928)
- 2004 – Reggie White, American football player and wrestler (born 1961)
- Casualties of the 2004 Indian Ocean earthquake and tsunami:
  - Troy Broadbridge, Australian footballer (born 1980)
  - Sigurd Køhn, Norwegian saxophonist and composer (born 1959)
  - Mieszko Talarczyk, Polish-Swedish singer-songwriter, guitarist, and producer (born 1974)
- 2005 – Muriel Costa-Greenspon, American soprano (born 1937)
- 2005 – Ted Ditchburn, English footballer and manager (born 1921)
- 2005 – Kerry Packer, Australian publisher and businessman (born 1937)
- 2005 – Viacheslav Platonov, Russian volleyball player and coach (born 1939)
- 2005 – Vincent Schiavelli, American actor (born 1948)
- 2005 – Erich Topp, German commander (born 1914)
- 2006 – Gerald Ford, American commander, lawyer, and politician, 38th President of the United States (born 1913)
- 2006 – Ivar Formo, Norwegian skier and engineer (born 1951)
- 2006 – Munir Niazi, Pakistani poet (born 1923)
- 2009 – Felix Wurman, American cellist and composer (born 1958)
- 2010 – Salvador Jorge Blanco, 48th President of the Dominican Republic (born 1926)
- 2010 – Edward Bhengu, South African activist (born 1934)
- 2010 – Teena Marie, American singer-songwriter and producer (born 1956)
- 2011 – Houston Antwine, American football player (born 1939)
- 2011 – Pedro Armendáriz, Jr., Mexican-American actor and producer (born 1940)
- 2011 – Sarekoppa Bangarappa, Indian politician, 15th Chief Minister of Karnataka (born 1932)
- 2011 – Joe Bodolai, American screenwriter and producer (born 1948)
- 2011 – James Rizzi, American painter and illustrator (born 1950)
- 2012 – Gerry Anderson, English director, producer, and screenwriter (born 1929)
- 2012 – Gerald McDermott, American author and illustrator (born 1941)
- 2012 – Ibrahim Tannous, Lebanese general (born 1929)
- 2013 – Paul Blair, American baseball player and coach (born 1944)
- 2013 – Marta Eggerth, Hungarian-American actress and singer (born 1912)
- 2014 – Stanisław Barańczak, Polish-American poet, critic, and scholar (born 1946)
- 2014 – James B. Edwards, American dentist, soldier, and politician, 3rd United States Secretary of Energy (born 1927)
- 2014 – Leo Tindemans, Belgian politician, 43rd Prime Minister of Belgium (born 1922)
- 2015 – Sidney Mintz, American anthropologist and academic (born 1922)
- 2015 – Jim O'Toole, American baseball player (born 1937)
- 2016 – Ricky Harris, American comedian, actor (born 1962)
- 2016 – George S. Irving, American actor, singer and dancer (born 1922)
- 2017 – Irv Weinstein, American broadcaster and television news anchor (born 1930)
- 2020 – Brodie Lee, American Professional Wrestler (born 1979)
- 2021 – Giacomo Capuzzi, Italian Roman Catholic prelate, bishop of the Roman Catholic Diocese of Lodi (born 1929)
- 2021 – Paul B. Kidd, Australian author, journalist, and radio show host (born 1945)
- 2021 – Karolos Papoulias, Greek politician, President of Greece from 2005 to 2015 (born 1929)
- 2021 – Desmond Tutu, South African Anglican bishop, theologian and anti-apartheid and human rights activist (born 1931)
- 2021 – Nell Hall Williams, American quilter (born 1933)
- 2021 – Edward O. Wilson, American biologist (born 1929)
- 2023 – Lukas Enembe, Indonesian politician, Governor of Papua from 2013 to 2023 (born1967)
- 2023 – Tom Smothers, American comedian, actor, and activist (born 1937)
- 2024 – Richard Parsons, American business executive (born 1948)
- 2024 – Manmohan Singh, Indian economist and politician, 13th Prime Minister of India (born 1932)
- 2025 – Pate Mustajärvi, Finnish rock singer (born 1956)

== Holidays and observances ==
- Boxing Day, except when December 26 is a Sunday. If it is a Sunday, Boxing Day is transferred to December 27 by Royal Proclamation. (Commonwealth of Nations), and its related observances:
  - Day of Good Will (South Africa and Namibia)
  - Family Day (Vanuatu)
  - Thanksgiving (Solomon Islands)
- Christian feast day:
  - Abadiu of Antinoe (Coptic Church)
  - Pope Dionysius
  - James the Just (Eastern Orthodox Church)
  - Saint Stephen (Western Church)
  - Synaxis of the Theotokos (Eastern Orthodox Church)
  - Vicenta María López i Vicuña
  - December 26 (Eastern Orthodox liturgics)
- Independence and Unity Day (Slovenia)
- Mauro Hamza Day (Houston, Texas)
- Mummer's Day (Padstow, Cornwall)
- Saint Stephen's Day (public holiday in Alsace, Austria, Catalonia, Croatia, the Czech Republic, Germany, Hong Kong, Italy, Ireland, Luxembourg, Poland, Slovakia and Switzerland), and its related observances:
  - Father's Day (Bulgaria)
- The first day of Kwanzaa, celebrated until January 1 (United States)
- The first day of Junkanoo street parade, the second day is on the New Year's Day (The Bahamas)
- The second day of the Twelve Days of Christmas (Western Christianity)
  - Second day of Christmas (Public holiday in the Netherlands, Poland and Slovakia)
- Wren Day (Ireland and the Isle of Man)
