= George Kleidas =

Historical clergyman

- Born: 1253; Greek
- Died: Unknown
- Occupation: Metropolitan
- Known for: the metropolitan bishop of Cyzicus

George Kleidas (Greek: Γεώργιος Κλειδᾶς) was the metropolitan bishop of Cyzicus in ca. 1253–61.

In 1253/4, along with the Metropolitan of Sardis Andronikos, he led an embassy on behalf of the Nicaean emperor John III Doukas Vatatzes (r. 1222–54) to Rome, to negotiate with Pope Innocent IV about a possible Union of the Churches. The embassy was detained for several months by Conrad IV, and arrive in Rome only in April 1254. The proposed terms, including the return of Constantinople to the Greeks and the reinstatement of the Orthodox bishops across all Latin-held territories in exchange for the recognition of Papal primacy, led nowhere. On their return, the envoys were angrily berated by Vatatzes' successor, Theodore II Laskaris (r. 1254–58), for their conduct of the negotiations.

He attended a synod at Nymphaion in 1256. Following the Byzantine reconquest of Constantinople in 1261, George presided over the ceremonial entry of Emperor Michael VIII Palaiologos (r. 1259–82) in Constantinople.

He had two sons, John and Michael.

== Sources ==
- Macrides, Ruth (2007). George Akropolites: The History – Introduction, Translation and Commentary. Oxford: Oxford University Press. ISBN 978-0-19-921067-1.
- Trapp, Erich; Beyer, Hans-Veit (2001). Prosopographisches Lexikon der Palaiologenzeit (in German). Vol. I, 1–12, Add. 1–2, CD-ROM Version. Vienna: Verlag der Österreichischen Akademie der Wissenschaften. ISBN 978-3-7001-3003-1.
