= Andronikos of Sardis =

13th-century Byzantine bishop

Andronikos (Greek: Ἀνδρόνικος) was the metropolitan bishop of Sardis in 1250–60 and 1283–84 and involved in the ecclesiastical and political disputes of his time.

In 1253/4, along with George Kleidas, the Metropolitan of Cyzicus, he led an embassy on behalf of the Nicaean emperor John III Doukas Vatatzes (r. 1222–54) to Rome, to negotiate with Pope Innocent IV about a possible Union of the Churches. The embassy was detained for several months by Conrad IV, and arrive in Rome only in April 1254. The proposed terms, including the return of Constantinople to the Greeks and the reinstatement of the Orthodox bishops across all Latin-held territories in exchange for the recognition of Papal primacy, led nowhere, On their return, the envoys were reprimanded by Vatatzes' successor, Theodore II Laskaris (r. 1254–58), for their conduct of the negotiations.

Andronikos was an opponent of Michael VIII Palaiologos (r. 1259–82). According to George Akropolites, he engaged in agitation against the emperor in Paphlagonia. As a result, in 1260 he was deposed and tonsured as a monk (with the name of Athanasios) at the Monastery of the Saviour at Selymbria by Joannicius, Metropolitan of Philadelphia. Patriarch Arsenios Autoreianos repeatedly tried to have him reinstated in 1261–65, but the Church synod always blocked him.

Andronikos was finally restored to his see in 1283 by Michael VIII's son and successor Andronikos II Palaiologos (r. 1282–1328), who tried to tread a middle course between the Arsenite faction—the supporters of Arsenios Autoreianos, who refused to recognize Michael VIII's legitimacy after Arsenios had excommunicated him—and their opponents, who had remained loyal to Michael VIII and been willing to support his ultimately failed attempt to achieve Union with the Roman Catholic Church. As a further gesture towards the Arsenites, Andronikos II even appointed the Metropolitan of Sardis as his personal confessor. After Patriarch Joseph I Galesiotes died in March 1283, the Arsenites expected one of their own to be named as his successor. Emperor Andronikos II however chose a neutral candidate, Gregory II, and the Arsenites became further entrenched in their demands to bring to account of all those who had supported the Union under Michael VIII. Andronikos of Sardis in particular distinguished himself with his intransigent stance in the Synod held at Blachernae shortly after Gregory II's appointment, at which several prominent churchmen, as well as the Empress-dowager Theodora Palaiologina were forced to recant and apologize for their past stance.

Nevertheless, the stand-off continued, and came to the fore again in another synod at Adramyttion in 1284. Mired in dispute over the legitimacy of Gregory II's appointment, the synod achieved little, but one of his pupils denounced Andronikos for lese majeste. Andronikos, who had been eyeing the patriarchate himself, found himself deposed once more and returned to the rank of a simple monk. Indeed, the Metropolitan of Larissa Nikandros is said to have mockingly removed his bishop's mitre and replaced it with a monk's cowl in front of the entire synod.

== Sources ==
- Macrides, Ruth (2007). George Akropolites: The History – Introduction, Translation and Commentary. Oxford: Oxford University Press. ISBN 978-0-19-921067-1.
- Nicol, Donald MacGillivray (1993). The Last Centuries of Byzantium, 1261–1453. Cambridge: Cambridge University Press. ISBN 0-521-43991-4.
- Trapp, Erich; Beyer, Hans-Veit; Walther, Rainer; Sturm-Schnabl, Katja; Kislinger, Ewald; Leontiadis, Ioannis; Kaplaneres, Sokrates (1976–1996). Prosopographisches Lexikon der Palaiologenzeit (in German). Vienna: Verlag der Österreichischen Akademie der Wissenschaften. ISBN 3-7001-3003-1.
