= Florentius of Sardis =

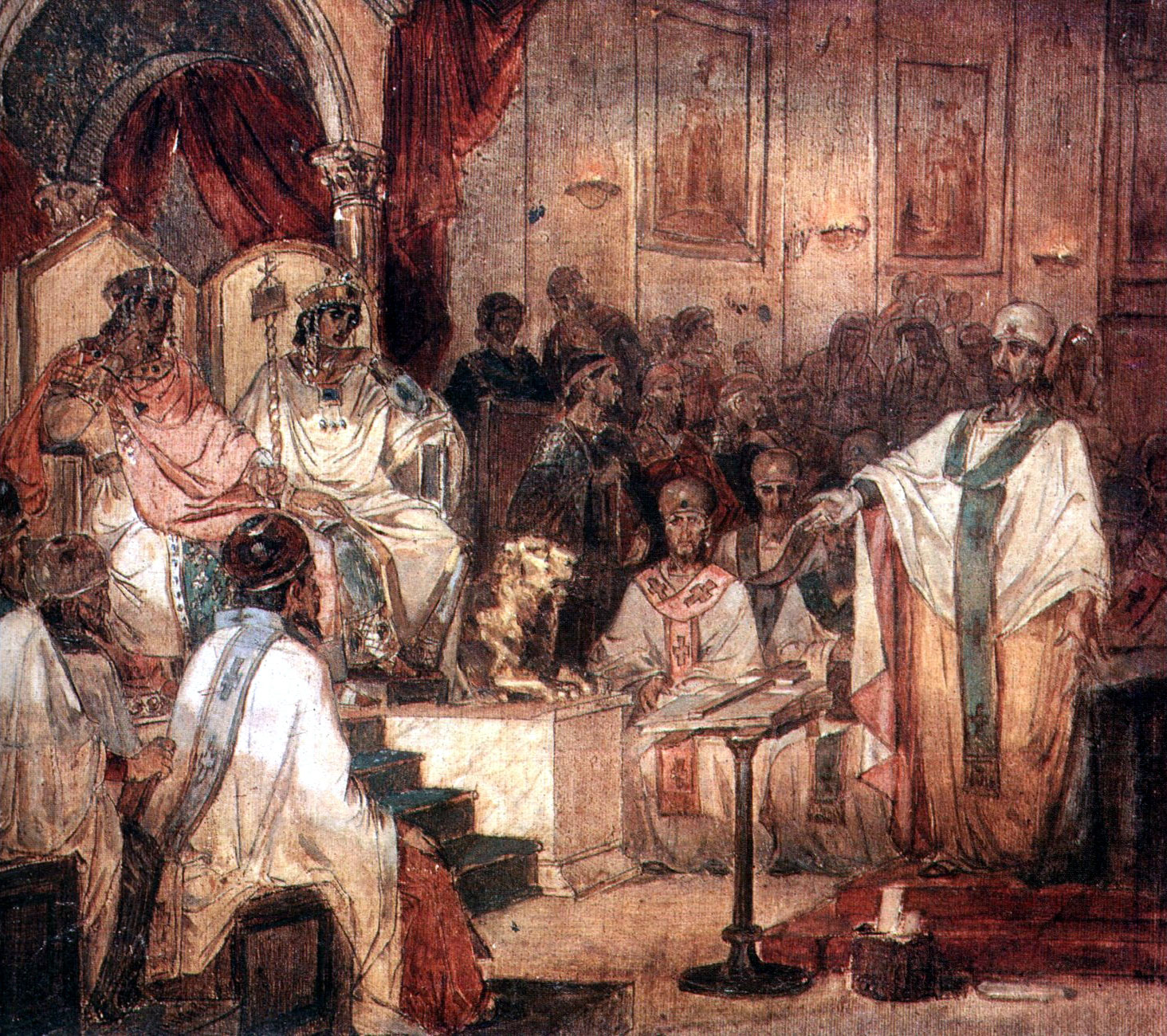
Council of chalcedon - (1876)

Florentius of Sardis was a 5th-century bishop of Sardis and theologian.

He was also an attendee to the Council of Chalcedon fl 451. where he noted himself by giving impromptu translations of Latin text for his Greek speaking colleagues. and at one heated point in the council, he called for an adjournment. He was also one of 22 delegates who formed a subcommittee of the council, to examine and formulate the statement for the ecumenical council. In the list of bishops at the council, he appeared in the eleventh position out of 305 bishops, between Peter of Corinth and Eunomius of Nicomedia.

He was the recipient of a letter from Theodoret, who urged Florentius to oppose heresy and support those who are being persecuted.
