= December 26 (Eastern Orthodox liturgics) =

Day in the Eastern Orthodox liturgical calendar

Eastern Orthodox liturgical calendar
December 25	December 26	December 27
December 26 O.S. ≍ January 8 N.S. December 26 N.S ≍ December 13 O.S.

An Eastern Orthodox cross

December 26 in Eastern Orthodox liturgical calendars is a feast day and a day of commemoration of saints and martyrs. Although some Orthodox churches use the Revised Julian Calendar and others use the traditional Julian calendar, the fixed commemorations for their respective December 26 are broadly the same, no matter which calendar is used. (Note: Despite the dates being the same, the days to which they refer typically differ by 13 days. The notation Old Style or O.S. is sometimes used to indicate a date in the traditional Julian Calendar (the "Old Calendar"). The notation New Style or N.S. indicates a date in the Revised Julian calendar (the "New Calendar").)

== Feasts ==
- Second Day of the Feast of the Nativity. (Note: On the day after the Nativity of Christ we celebrate the Synaxis of the Most Holy Theotokos, and come together to give her glory and praise. This is the second day of the three-day Winter Pascha.)
- Synaxis of the Most Holy Theotokos. (Note: The Synaxis of the Most Holy Theotokos: On the second day of the feast, the Synaxis of the Most Holy Theotokos is celebrated. Combining the hymns of the Nativity with those celebrating the Mother of God, the Church points to Mary as the one through whom the Incarnation was made possible. His humanity—concretely and historically—is the humanity He received from Mary. His body is, first of all, her body. His life is her life. This feast, the assembly in honor of the Theotokos, is probably the most ancient feast of Mary in the Christian tradition, the very beginning of her veneration by the Church.)
- Commemoration of the flight into Egypt of the Most Blessed Theotokos.
- Commemoration of Saint Joseph, King David, and Saint James, brother of the Lord.

== Saints ==
- Saint Archelaus, Bishop of Harran (Haran) in Northern Mesopotamia (c. 280) (Note: "In Mesopotamia, St. Archelaus, a bishop celebrated for learning and sanctity.")
- Saint Zeno (Zenon), Bishop of Maiuma (the port of Gaza) in Palestine (4th century) (Note: "At Majuma, St. Zeno, bishop.")
- Venerable Evarestus (Evaristus), Monk of the Studion Monastery (825)
- Hieromartyr Euthymius the Confessor, Bishop of Sardis (840) (Note: St. Euthymius is also commemorated on March 8. In certain Synaxaria his memory is also celebrated on October 11.)
- Venerable Constantine, Monk of Synnada, the former Jew (9th century)

== Pre-Schism Western saints ==
- Saint Dionysius, Pope of Rome (268) (Note: A priest chosen as Pope of Rome in 259, he restored the Roman Church after the persecution of Valerian, opposed Sabellius and condemned Paul of Samosata.)
- Saint Marinus, the son of a senator in Rome, he was martyred by beheading under Numerian (283) (Note: "At Rome, St. Marinus, senator. In the time of the emperor Numerian and the prefect Marcian, he was arrested for the Christian religion, racked and torn with iron hooks like a slave, then thrown into a burning pan; but being delivered because the fire became like dew, he was exposed to the beasts without being injured by them, and finally being led again to the altar, the idols of which toppled over at his prayer, he was struck with the sword, and thus obtained the triumph of martyrs.)
- Saint Zosimus, a Greek Pope of Rome (418)
- Saint Tathai (Tathan, Tathaeus, Athaeus), Abbot of Llantathan (early 6th century) (Note: A hermit who settled in Glamorgan in Wales where he founded a monastery called St Athan's.) (Note: "TATHAI, sometimes called TATHAR, and in Latin ATHEUS, was a native of Ireland, who came to Britain in order to leave all he had in the world, and lead a solitary life. It appears that he first lived as a hermit in the mountains of Wales, but afterwards established a monastery at Llantathan. From thence he was invited by Caradoc, King of Gwent, to make his abode at Caergwent, or Chepstow, in which place he is said to have founded a school and college. It is doubtful in which of these places he closed his holy life, but his memory was held in great veneration in England as well as in Wales.")
- Saint Jarlath, first Bishop of Tuam, founder of the monastery of Cluain Fois, near Tuam, Ireland (c. 540)
- Saint Theodore the Sacrist, a holy man and contemporary of Saint Gregory the Great in Rome (6th century) (Note: At Rome, St. Theodore, sacristan of St. Peter's church, who is mentioned by Pope Gregory.)
- Saint Amaethlu (Maethlu); a church founded by him in the village of Llanfaethlu in Anglesey, Wales, is named after him (6th century)

== Post-Schism Orthodox saints ==
- Saint Nicodemus the Sanctified of Tismana, Romania (1406)

=== New martyrs and confessors ===
- New Hieromartyr Constantius (Constantine) the Russian, Priest at the Great Lavra on Mount Athos and Constantinople, by beheading (1743)
- New Hieromartyrs Alexander Volkov and Demetrius Chistoserdov, Priests (1919)
- New Hieromartyrs Nicholas Tarbeev, Michael Cheltsov, and Nicholas Zalessky, Priests; and Michael Smirnov, Deacon (1931)
- New Hieromartyr Andrew, Bishop of Ufa (1937)
- New Martyr Valentina of Russia (1937)
- New Hieromartyr Leonid Antoshchenko, Bishop of Mariisk (1938)
- New Hieromartyr Basil Mazurenko, Hieromonk (1938)
- New Hieromartyr Alexander Krylov, Priest (1938)
- New Virgin Martyrs Anthisa (Sysoeva) and Makaria (Saprykina) (1938)
- Venerable New Hieromartyr Isaac II Bobrikov, Archimandrite of Optina Monastery (1938)
- New Hieromartyr Gregory Serbarinov, Priest (1938)
- New Virgin Martyrs Augusta Zaschuk and Mary Laktionova (1938)
- New Martyr Agrippina Lesina (1938)
- Venerable Hieromartyr Gherasim (Iscu) of Tismana, Archimandrite, abbot of Tismana Monastery (1951)

== Other commemorations ==
- Repose of Abbot Barlaam of Valaam and Optina Monasteries (1849)
- Repose of Archimandrite Irenarchus Rosetti of Mount Tabor (1859)
- Repose of Elder Serapheim Savvaitis, Hegumen of the Holy Lavra of Saint Sabbas the Sanctified (2003)

=== Icons ===
- Icon of the "Mother of God of "Vilna" ("Vilen-Ostrabramsk", "Our Lady of the Gate of Dawn")
- Icon of the Mother of God "the Three Joys"
- Icon of the Mother of God "Merciful" (Greek: Eleousa)
- Icon of the Mother of God "the Blessed Womb" or "Barlovsk" (1392)
- "Bethlehem" Icon of the Mother of God
- Icon of the Mother of God "Baibuzsk" (Baibuskaya) (1852)

== Icon gallery ==
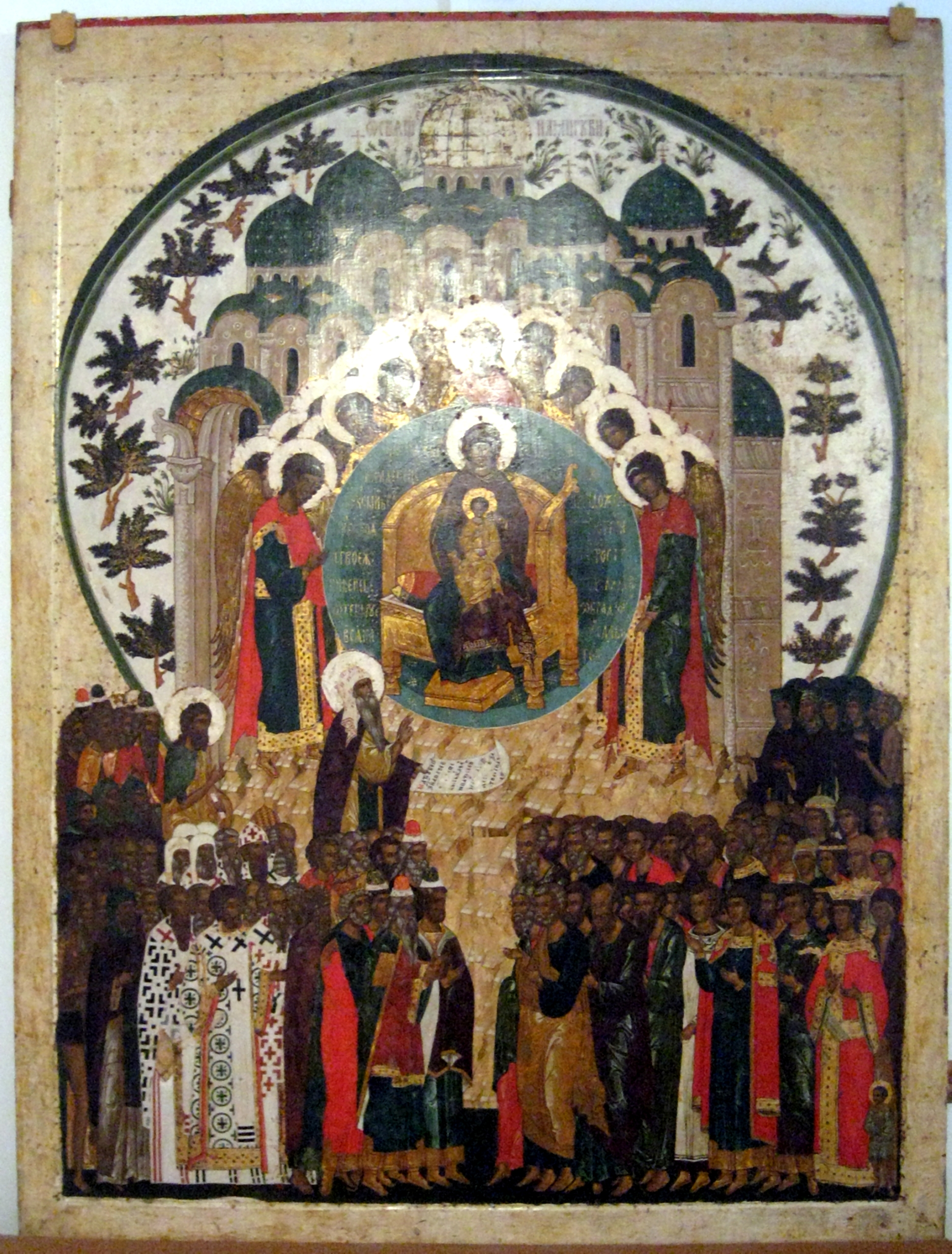
Synaxis of the Theotokos
(Kirillo-Belozersk Monastery, 15th–16th centuries).

The Flight into Egypt.
(Menologion of Basil II, 10th century).

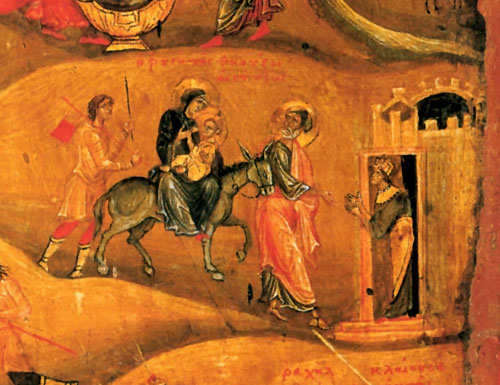
The Flight into Egypt.
(Saint Catherine's Monastery, Mount Sinai).

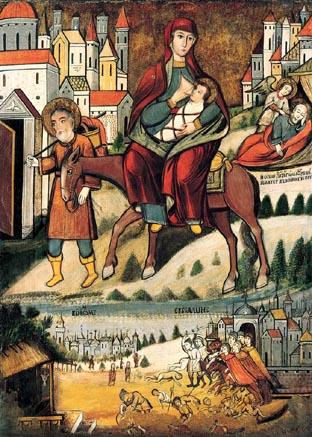
Ukrainian icon of the Flight into Egypt.
The bottom section shows the idols of Egypt miraculously falling down before Jesus and being smashed.
(17th century).

The Dream of Saint Joseph.
(Menologion of Basil II, 10th century).

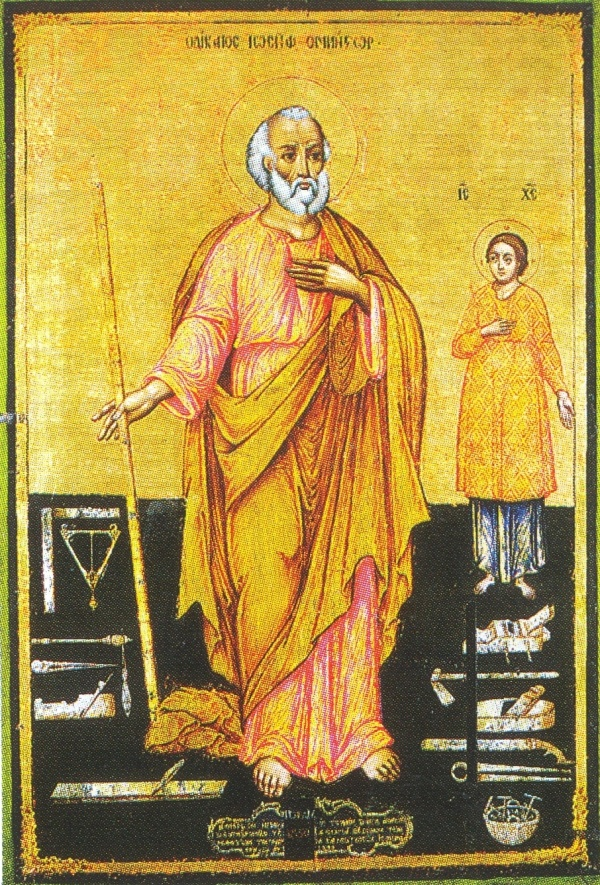
Saint Joseph the Betrothed.

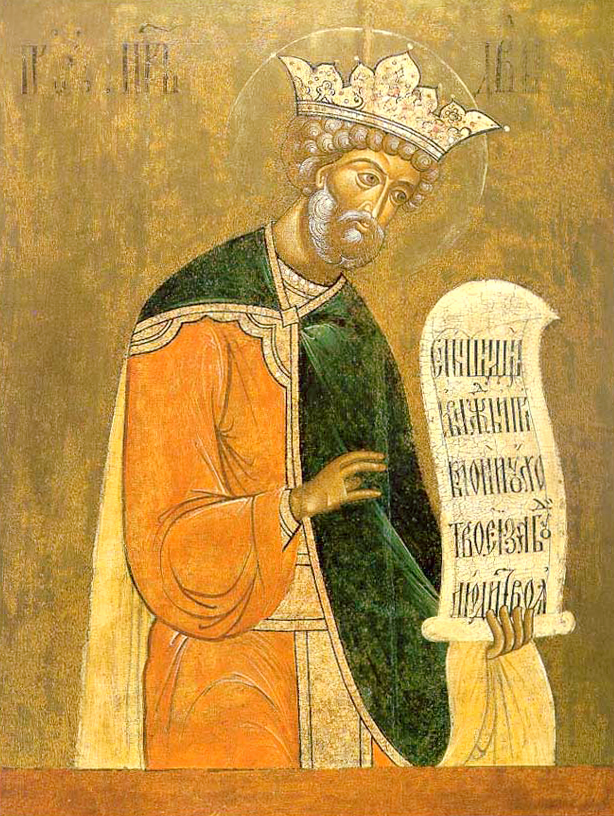
King David.

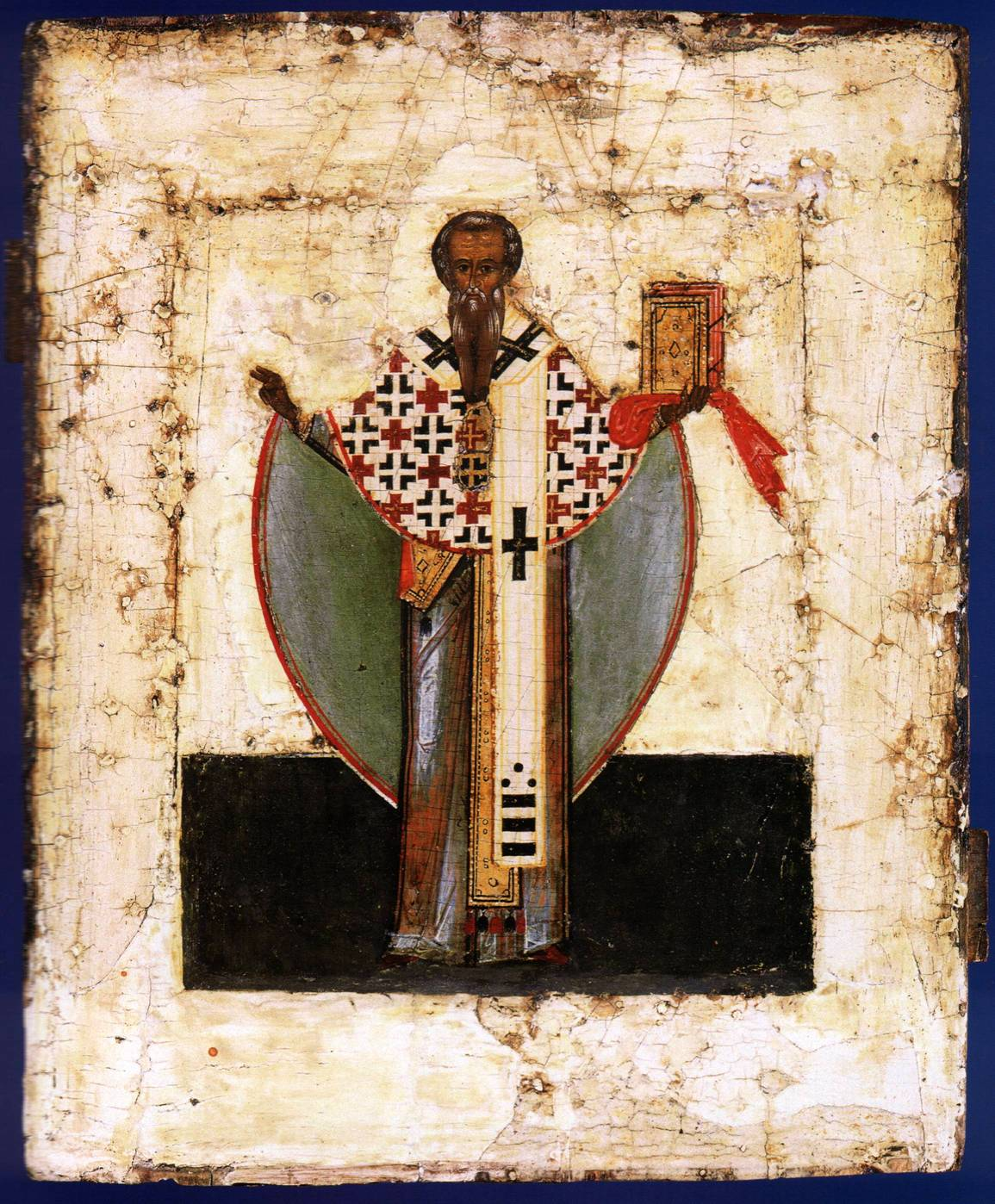
St. James, brother of the Lord.

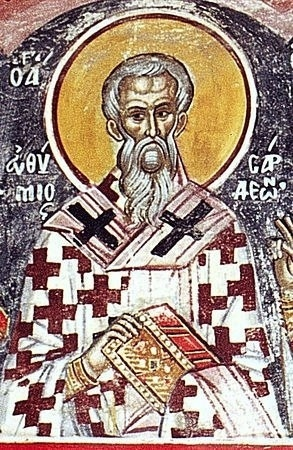
Hieromartyr Euthymius the Confessor, Bishop of Sardis.
(Moni Agiou Vissarionos).

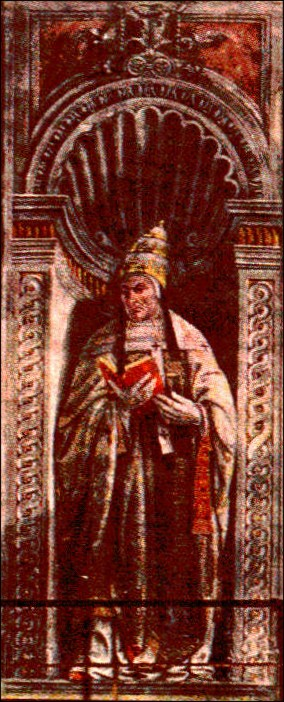
Pope Dionysius (259–268).
(Fresco in Sistine Chapel, Vatican).

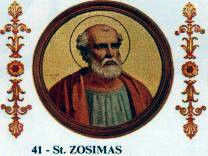
Pope Zosimus.

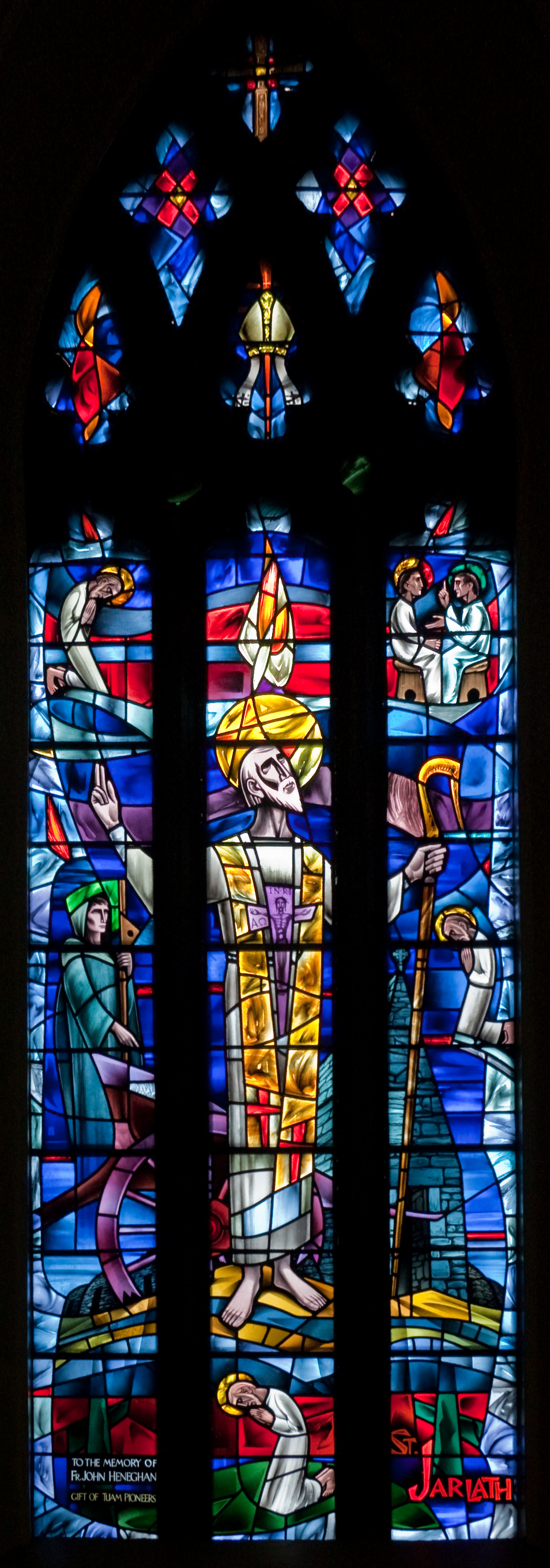
St. Jarlath.
(1961).

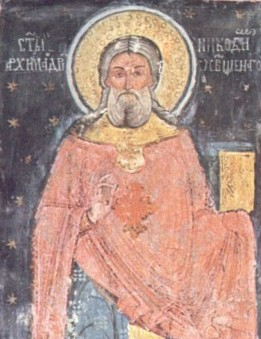
St. Nicodemus of Tismana, Romania.

New Hieromartyr Michael Cheltsov, Archpriest.

New Hieromartyr Leonid Antoshchenko, Bishop of Mariisk.

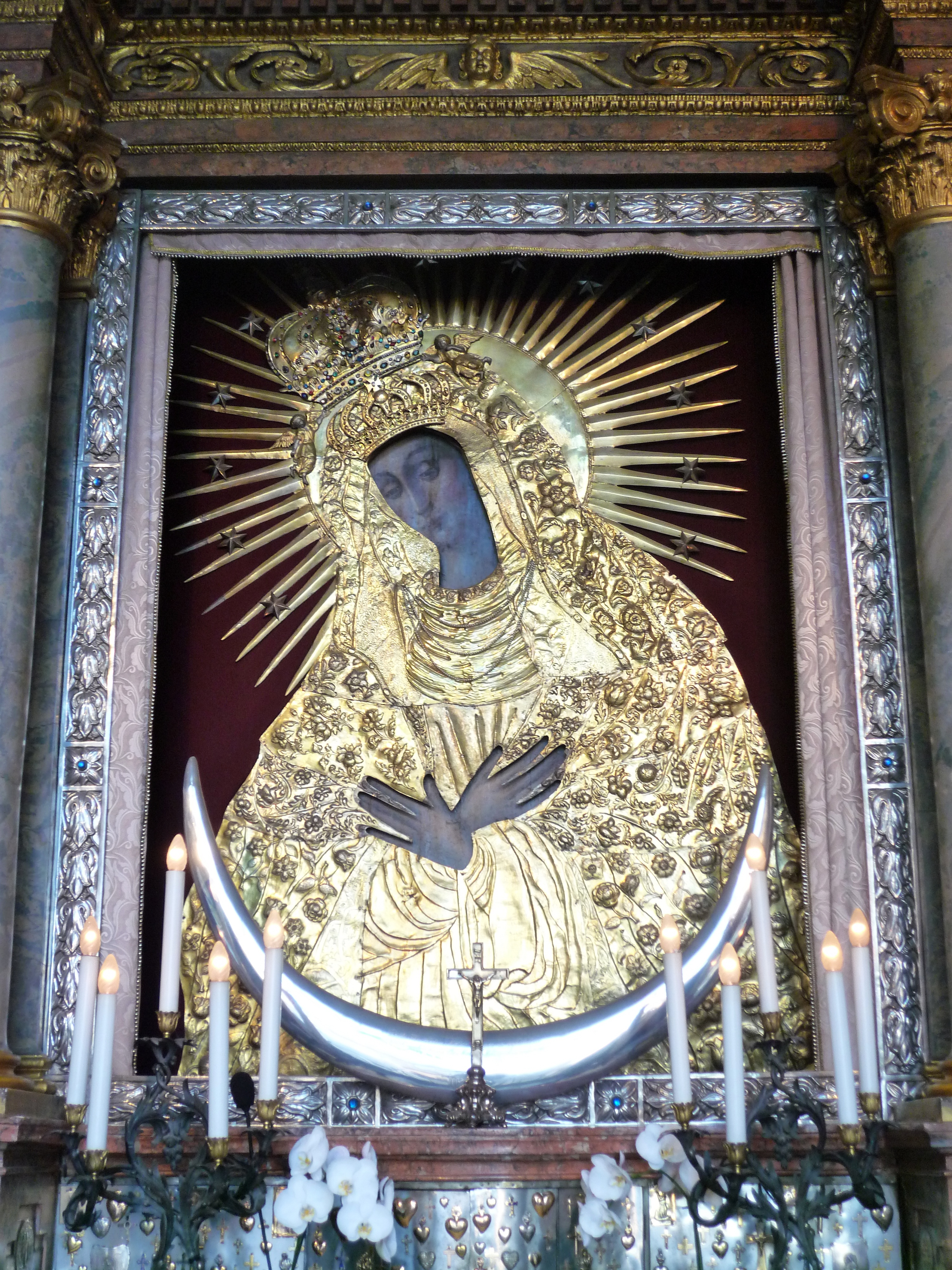
Icon of the "Mother of God of "Vilna"
(Our Lady of the Gate of Dawn, Vilnius)

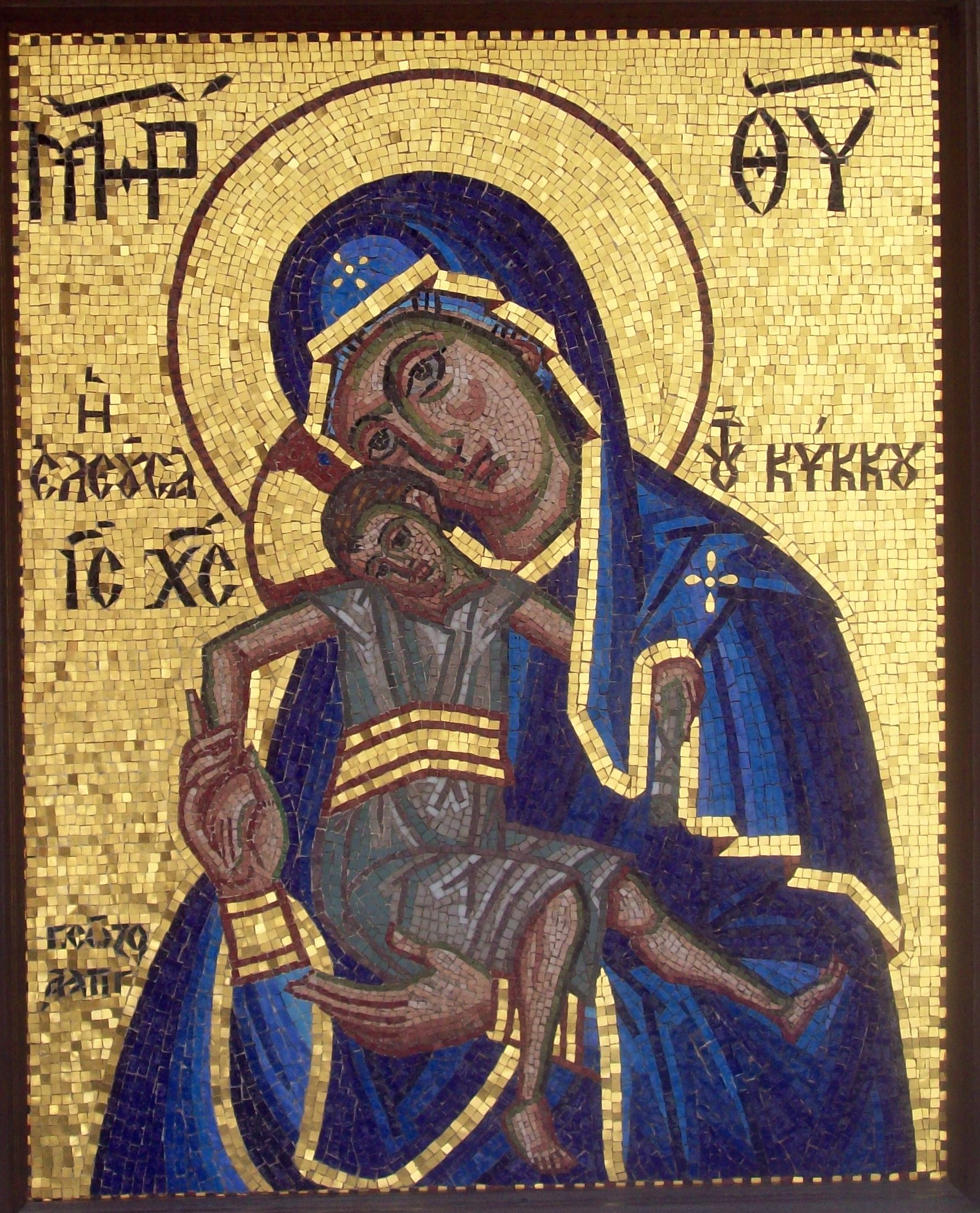
Icon of the Mother of God "Merciful".
(Mosaic icon from Kykkos Monastery, Cyprus).

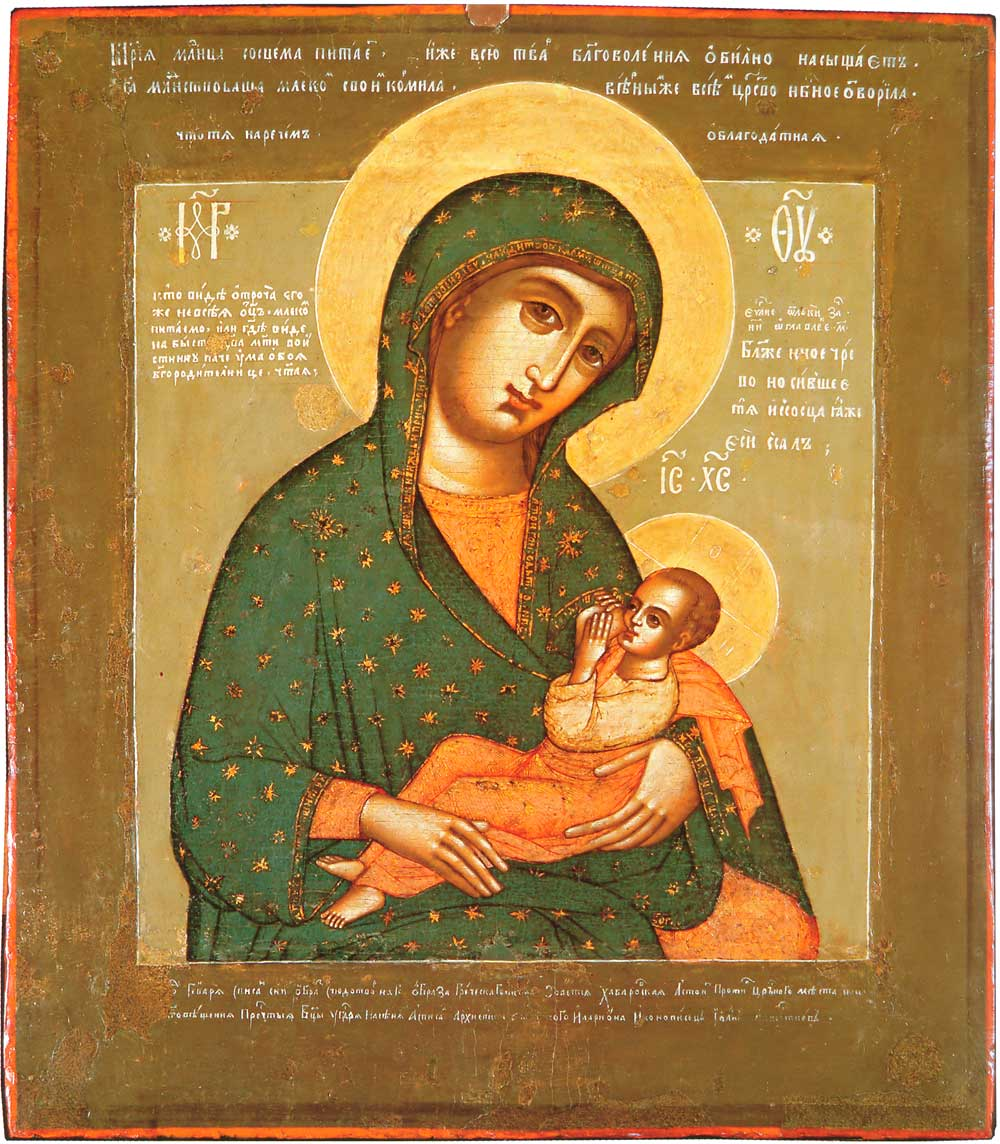
Icon of the Mother of God "the Blessed Womb" or "Barlovsk" (1392).

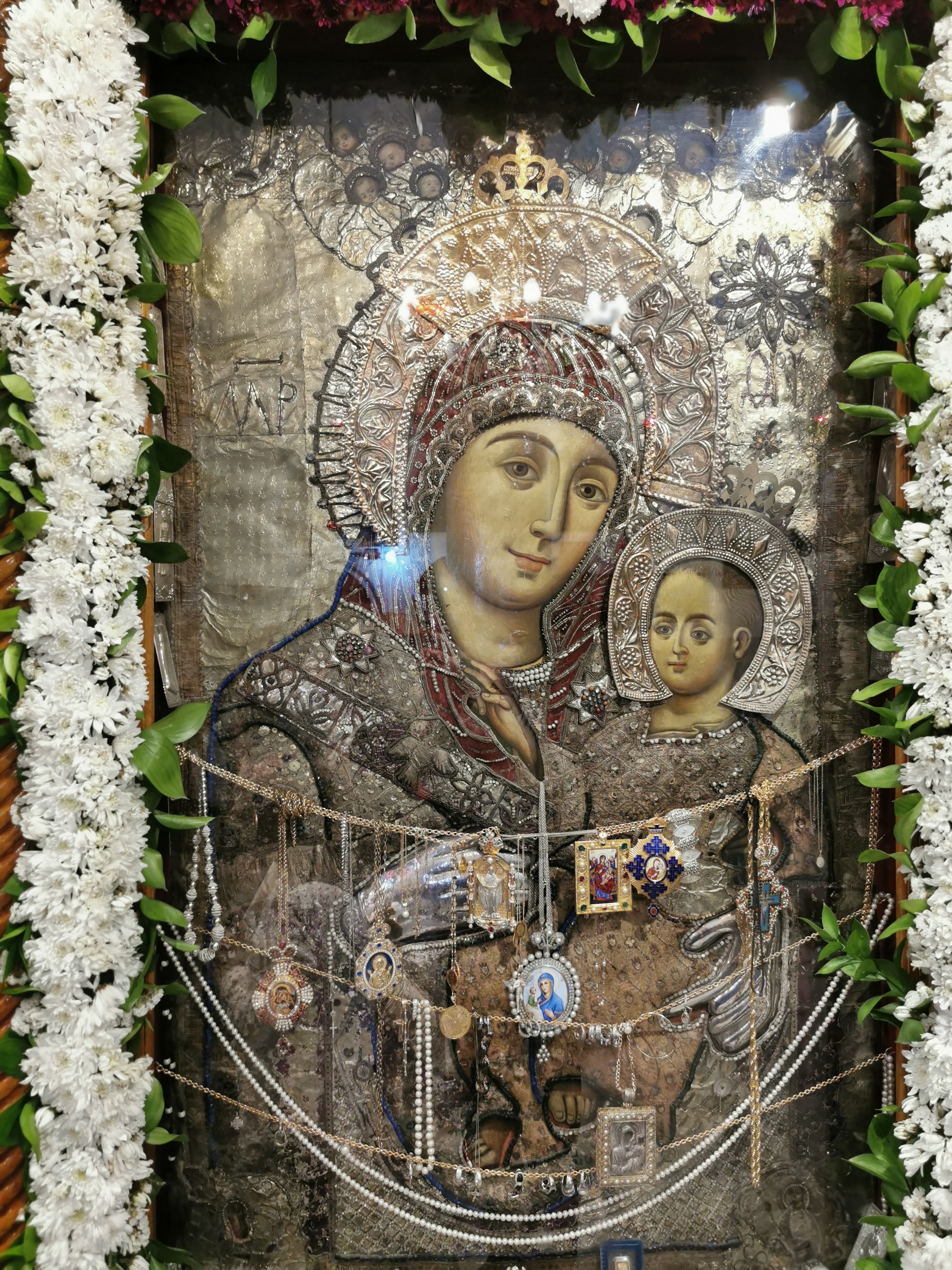
The "Bethlehem" Icon of the Mother of God.

== Sources ==
- December 26/January 8. Orthodox Calendar (PRAVOSLAVIE.RU).
- January 8 / December 26. HOLY TRINITY RUSSIAN ORTHODOX CHURCH (A parish of the Patriarchate of Moscow).
- December 26. OCA - The Lives of the Saints.
- The Autonomous Orthodox Metropolia of Western Europe and the Americas (ROCOR). St. Hilarion Calendar of Saints for the year of our Lord 2004. St. Hilarion Press (Austin, TX). pp. 2–3.
- December 26. Latin Saints of the Orthodox Patriarchate of Rome.
- The Roman Martyrology. Transl. by the Archbishop of Baltimore. Last Edition, According to the Copy Printed at Rome in 1914. Revised Edition, with the Imprimatur of His Eminence Cardinal Gibbons. Baltimore: John Murphy Company, 1916. pp. 397–398.

Greek Sources

- Great Synaxaristes: (in Greek) 26 ΔΕΚΕΜΒΡΙΟΥ. ΜΕΓΑΣ ΣΥΝΑΞΑΡΙΣΤΗΣ.
- (in Greek) Συναξαριστής. 26 Δεκεμβρίου. ECCLESIA.GR. (H ΕΚΚΛΗΣΙΑ ΤΗΣ ΕΛΛΑΔΟΣ).

Russian Sources

- (in Russian) 8 января (26 декабря). Православная Энциклопедия под редакцией Патриарха Московского и всея Руси Кирилла (электронная версия). (Orthodox Encyclopedia - Pravenc.ru).
- (in Russian) 26 декабря (ст.ст.) 8 января 2015 (нов. ст.). Русская Православная Церковь Отдел внешних церковных связей. (DECR).
