= Euthymius of Sardis =

Saint Euthymius of Sardis
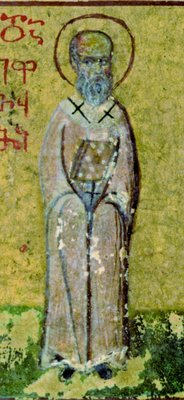
- Fresco from Moni Agiou Vissarionos

Hieromartyr and Confessor
- Born: 751 or 754; Ouzara
- Died: 26 December 831, St. Andrew Island
- Venerated in: Eastern Orthodox Church
- Feast: December 26; March 8

Euthymius of Sardis or Euthymius the Confessor (Greek: Εὐθύμιος Σάρδεων; 751 or 754 – 26 December 831) was metropolitan bishop of Sardis between ca. 785 and ca. 804, and a leading iconophile during the period of Byzantine Iconoclasm. Martyred in 831, he is a saint in the Eastern Orthodox Church, celebrated on 26 December and March 8.

== Life ==
Euthymius was born in 751 or 754 in Ouzara, probably in Lycaonia in central Asia Minor. At an early age he entered a monastery, and sometime between 784 and 787, he was ordained as metropolitan bishop of Sardis by Patriarch Tarasios of Constantinople. In this capacity he took part in the Second Council of Nicaea in 787, where he played a leading role in the council's decision to condemn Byzantine Iconoclasm. Euthymius spoke in several of the council's sessions, advocating the reinstatement of the exiled bishops Theodore of Amorium and Basil of Ancyra, the reinstatement of traditional veneration of icons as proposed by Tarasios and Pope Hadrian I, and the anathematizing of Iconoclasm and its supporters. According to his hagiography, sometime between 787 and 790 he participated in an embassy to the Abbasid court at Baghdad, where he distinguished himself by his ability and succeeded in securing a peace settlement with the Caliphate, but such a mission, let alone a peace treaty, is nowhere else attested for this period.

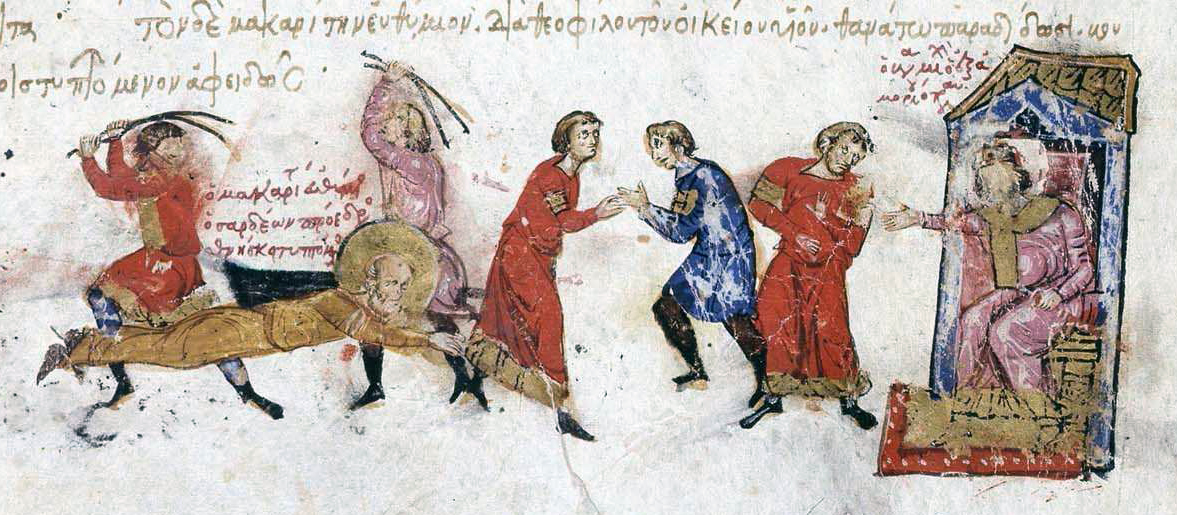
The martyrdom of Euthymius of Sardis, miniature from the Madrid Skylitzes

Under Emperor Nikephoros I (r. 802–811) he fell into disfavour and was deposed and exiled to the island of Pantelleria off Sicily (ca. 804). According to his hagiography, Nikephoros's animosity was due to Euthymius persuading a woman, whom the future emperor had desired, to become a nun, but the real motive was probably Euthymius's support for the rebellion of the general Bardanes Tourkos in 803. Thanks to the intervention of Patriarch Tarasios, he was recalled from exile soon after, but was not reinstated in his old see. When Iconoclasm was once more adopted as the official doctrine under emperors Leo V the Armenian (r. 813–820) and Michael II the Amorian (r. 820–829), Euthymius again defended the veneration of icons, for which he was arrested, whipped and exiled, then released only to be again arrested and exiled. He was particularly vehemently persecuted by the future patriarch John Grammatikos. The traditional chronology of his death, found both in Byzantine chroniclers (Genesios, John Skylitzes and Theophanes Continuatus) and older historiography and martyrology (cf. the entries in the Catholic Encyclopedia), is 26 December 824, when he was whipped to death at the orders of Michael II. Modern research, however, places it on 26 December 831 on the island of St. Andrew to the north of Cape Akritas on the Bithynian coast south of Constantinople, during the reign of Michael II's successor Theophilos (r. 829–842).

Euthymius's hagiography was written by Patriarch Methodios I of Constantinople. In addition, several letters by Theodore of Stoudios to Euthymius survive, as well as a panegyric poem in his honour, written by a certain Metrophanes.

== Sources ==
- December 26/January 8. Orthodox Calendar (PRAVOSLAVIE.RU).
- Kazhdan, Alexander (1991). "Euthymios of Sardis". In Kazhdan, Alexander (ed.). The Oxford Dictionary of Byzantium. New York and Oxford: Oxford University Press. p. 756. ISBN 978-0-19-504652-6.
- Winkelmann, Friedhelm; Lilie, Ralph-Johannes; et al. (1999). "Euthymios (#1838)". Prosopographie der mittelbyzantinischen Zeit: I. Abteilung (641–867), 1. Band: Aaron (#1) – Georgios (#2182) (in German). Walter de Gruyter. pp. 577–579. ISBN 3-11-015179-0.
