= Byzantine churches at Sardis =

Map of Manisa Province, Turkey; site of the ancient city of Sardis.

Sardis (modern Sart in the Manisa Province of Turkey) gained reputation and fame as one of the Seven Churches of Asia (or Seven Churches of the Apocalypse) when it was addressed by John in the Book of Revelation. Under pressure from curious archaeology enthusiasts, the Turkish government allowed for excavations to commence in 1910, during which the first of several Byzantine style churches were discovered.

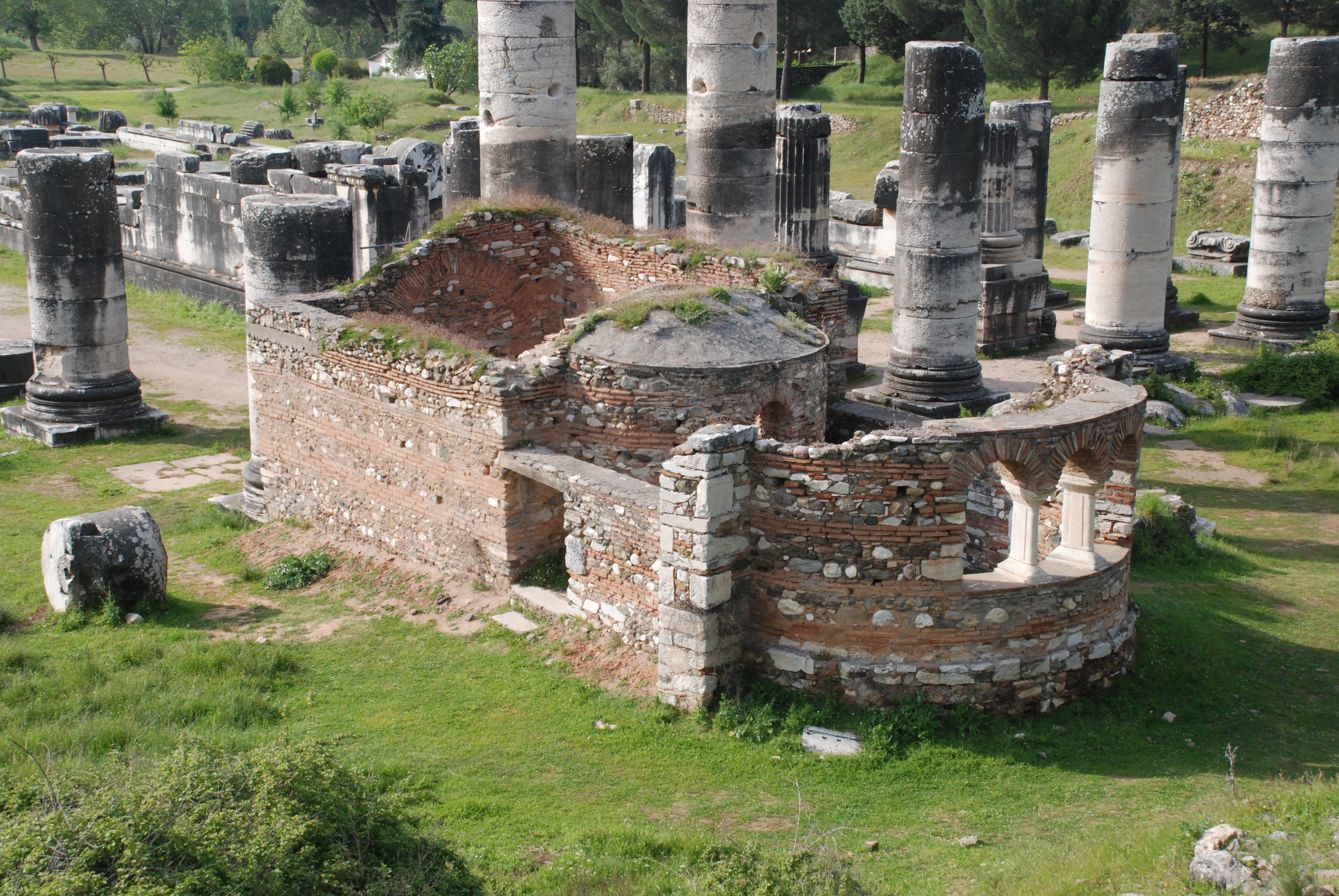
"Church M", a Byzantine style mortuary chapel, sits atop the ruins of the Temple of Artemis.

== Church M: Urban expansion through ecclesiastical architecture ==
"Church M" was a small, fourth-century mortuary chapel and the earliest extant Christian church at Sardis built on the abandoned grounds of the Hellenistic Greek Temple of Artemis on the Acropolis. It was discovered in the early 1900s by renowned professor of Art and Archaeology at Princeton, Howard Crosby Butler (1872-1922) on the First Sardis Expedition. Its close proximity to Church EA suggests an attempt at urban expansion through the creation of a ‘Christian quarter’ outside the walls of Sardis.

== Church EA: the Original Basilica ==
Church EA was a simple aisled basilica located in the Pactolus valley just beyond the southwest walls of Sardis. Although there are no known historical records of its initial construction, identification of coinage found during excavation suggests that Church EA may have been built in the middle of the fourth century AD, nearly a century before the first Christian building of its kind was erected in Constantinople (Church of St. John of the Stoudios, 453AD). Extant ornamental and architectural fragments include double-engaged support columns, ornately carved revetment door-frames, and modeled plaster decor styled with lozenge and scale patterned borders and crosses, some of which may be attributed to renovations conducted in later centuries. An expansive and vividly colored mosaic floor was uncovered in the buildings north aisle, featuring interwoven geometric shapes composed of irregularly cut tesserae, and evidence for painted walls of rich blues and black exists in over 400 fragments of brick and plaster. Although little is known about the original functioning of Church EA, evidence of its careful craftsmanship both suggest that it was a substantial place of worship in Asia Minor and that the Christian community had already reached a point of prominence in Sardis by the mid-fourth-century.

Church EA underwent numerous renovations and expansions including the addition of an east building and west wing, a large square atrium, a north courtyard, and numerous architectural carvings, all of which date prior to the early seventh century. Based on subsequent additions and repairs to the site throughout the medieval period, it is thought that the building remained in active use until as late as the thirteenth century.

== Building D ==
Building D was a massive imperial monument built in the sixth century. Although there is no extant textual or historical evidence that Building D functioned as a place of worship, careful excavation and illustrated reconstruction of the site reveals characteristics indicative of Byzantine ecclesiastic architecture of the period. Remains of brick and cut-stone piers are thought to have once supported colossal vaulted domes, and the compartmentalized base structure suggests a central hall, or nave, and lateral corridors of a church similar to those of the Urban Basilica of Hierapolis at Frigia. While Building D can be counted among the rare examples of Christian architecture at Sardis, it is unique in that it is located in what was a densely populated area within the city walls, and its craftsmanship was of a lesser quality than that of Churches EA and M. Moreover, its construction illustrates the shift in style that occurred in Asia Minor from the simple basilica of the fourth-century to the massive vaulted domes preferred merely two centuries later.

== Church E ==
Church E was a compact, quintuple-domed building of brick and marble constructed directly over the leveled ruins of Church EA around the thirteenth century. The mismatched, collage-like use of such materials as damaged ashlar blocks and Attic style column bases indicates that Church E was made entirely of repurposed components. Traces of thin glass and gold tesserae are evidentiary of windows and limited mosaics, although much of the walls surface seems to have been decorated with murals. A small pit in the church’s south aisle (known as the “Pseudocrypt”) was excavated in 1963, revealing two graves thought to be the reburied remains of men who were lauded as saints. It is believed that when Sardis was taken under Turkish rule in the fourteenth century, Church E was repurposed for industrial use until it was destroyed by an earthquake that leveled much of the area in 1595.
