= See of Sardis =

Religious administrative area in Sardis, Asia Minor

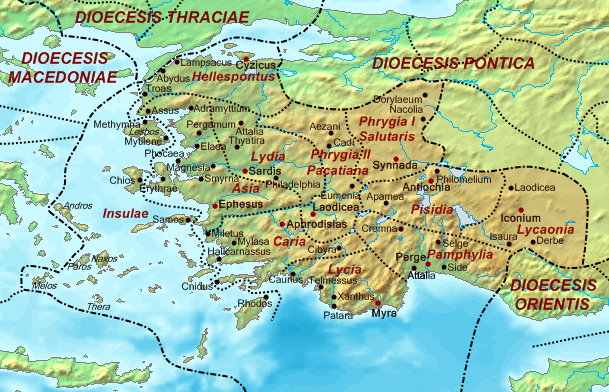
Map of the civil Diocese of Asia and its provinces in Late Antiquity, which was paralleled by the ecclesiastical administration

The See of Sardis or Sardes (Greek: Σάρδεις, Sardeis) was an episcopal see in the city of that name. It was one of the Seven Churches of the Apocalypse, held by metropolitan bishops since the middle to late 1st century, with jurisdiction over the province of Lydia, when this was formed in 295. After 1369 it became a titular see both for the Greek Orthodox Church and the Roman Catholic Church.

== History ==
According to the Menologion, Clement, a disciple of Paul of Tarsus and one of the Seventy (Philippians 4:3), was the first bishop of Sardis. Little is known about the ancient bishopric of Sardis, with the notable exception of Saint Melito, a contemporary of Marcus Aurelius from the 2nd century, whom some sources refer to as the second bishop of Sardis—citing the "improbability of seventy years in the episcopate"—making him the successor to the "angel of the church of Sardis" referenced in the New Testament (Rev. 3:1-3), while other sources regard Melito himself as the "apostle" or "angel of the church of Sardis." In the Book of Revelation, Saint John writes a letter to the church of Sardis, reproaching it and its bishop.

After Diocletian reorganized the region in 295, Sardis became the capital of the province of Lydia, the seat of the governor and of the metropolitan archbishop.

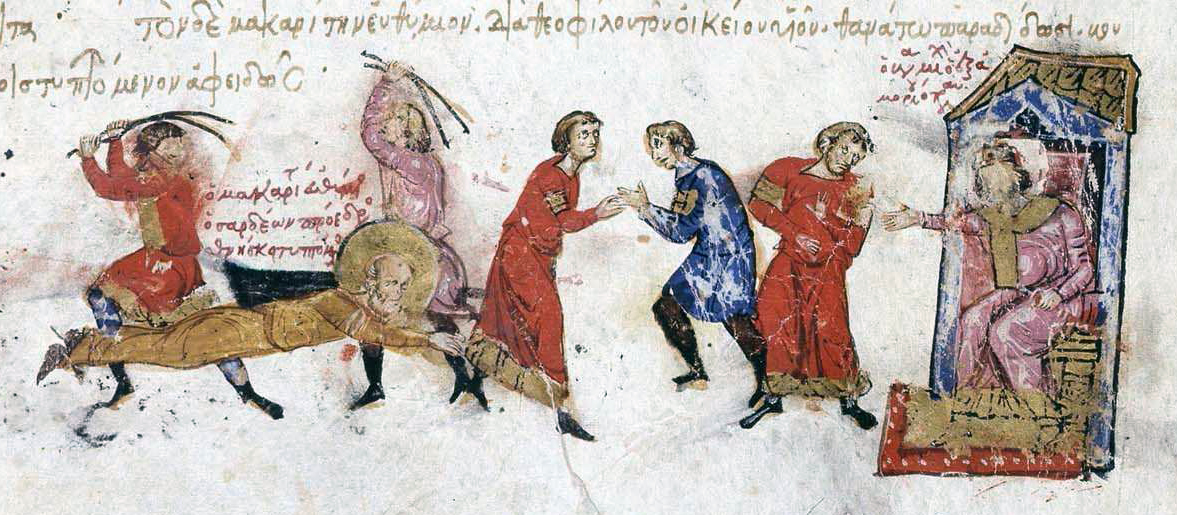
The martyrdom of Euthymius of Sardis. From the Madrid Skylitzes.

The Council of Rimini deposed Bishop Hortasius of Sardis in 359 because he had been ordained without the sanction of the bishops of Lydia. The See had 27 suffragan bishops (including the bishop of Thyatira and Philadelphia) in the 7th century, and approximately that number until the end of the 10th century.

There is only one known epigraphic reference to the see of Sardis, dated to the 5th or 6th century. A 1959 landslide revealed several ecclesiastical artifacts and a throne that archaeologists postulated may have been used by the bishops of Sardis. The first systemic investigation of the ruins of Sardis came in 1910 with an expedition from Princeton University. Excavations in 1912 revealed a small "Church M", containing coins which were dated to the 5th century and an apse overhanging one of the earliest known Christian altars, near the north eastern corner of the Temple of Artemis.

Arabs sacked Sardis in 716, but the city remained a part of a resurgent Roman (Byzantine) Empire until the aftermath of the battle of Manzikert in 1071. Euthymius, a Metropolitan Bishop of Sardis, was martyred in 824 in relation to iconoclasm.

=== East-West schism ===
In 1118, Byzantine general Philocales recaptured Sardis from the Seljuk Sultanate of Rum. Andronikos], Bishop of Sardis c. 1283, made several attempts at East-West reunification. The Ottoman Turks captured Sardis in 1306; the city was destroyed by Timur in 1402.

The Metropolitan of Sardis, who had once ranked sixth in precedence in the Eastern church, continued to hold that rank into the 13th century, long after Sardis had shrunk to a village which was no longer a regional locus of power. In 1369, Philadelphia replaced Sardis as the see of the metropolitan bishop, Sardis having been suppressed by the Patriarch of Constantinople. However, a bearer of the title of Metropolitan of Sardis, Dionysius, participated in the Council of Florence in 1438, but died before its conclusion and thus was not asked to sign its decree.

From the 17th century, there were appointments of Roman Catholic archbishops of Sardis as a see in partibus infidelium, meaning "within territory held by the infidels" (the Muslims), a term replaced in 1882 by that of "titular see". No new such appointments have been made to this eastern see since the Second Vatican Council.

== Metropolitan bishops ==
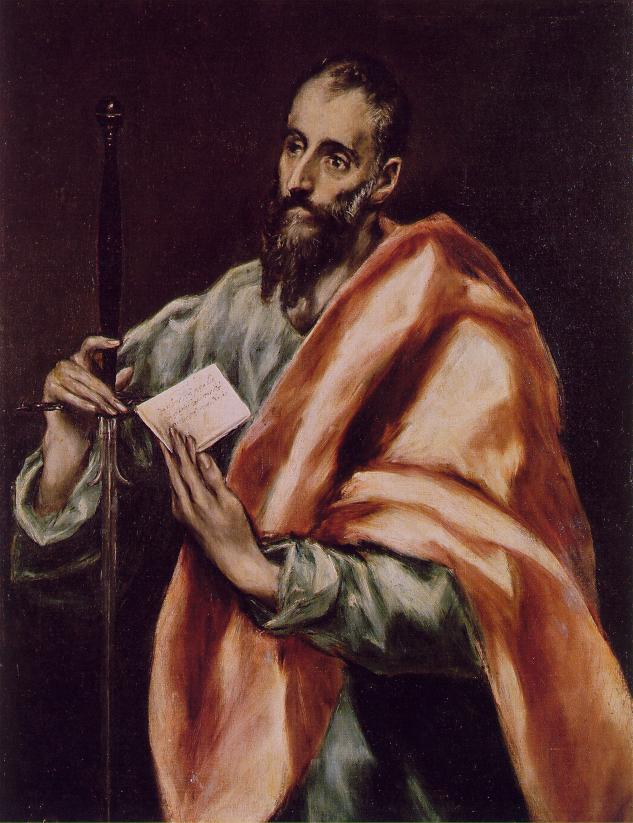
Clement, a disciple of Paul the Apostle (pictured), attested to in Paul's Epistle to the Philippians is the first recorded bishop of Sardis.

One of the first scholarly listings of the bishops of Sardis is given by Michel Le Quien in Oriens christianus in quatuor patriarchatus digestus, in quo exhibentur Ecclesiae patriarchae caeterique praesules totius Orientis (abbreviated Oriens Christ.), published posthumously in 1740.

- Clement (Philippians 4.3)
- Melito of Sardis, c. 180
- Hieromartyr Therapont of Sardis, c. 259
- Heortasius (or Hortasius) (deposed in 359 by the Council of Ariminum)
- Maeonius of Sardis fl 431 attendee at Council of Ephesus
- Florentin (or Florentius), c. the 448 Synod of Constantinople
- Hieromartyr Euthymius, c. 787—December 26, 824
- John, successor of Euthymius
- Peter, c. 835
- Euthymios, 10th century
- Andronikos, c. 1283–1315, deposed for being an Arsenite
- Dionysius, c. the 1438 Council of Florence
- Germanos Troianos, c. 1923
- Maximos, 1946–1986
- Evangelos Kourounis, 2020–present (formerly of New Jersey)

== Catholic titular archbishops ==
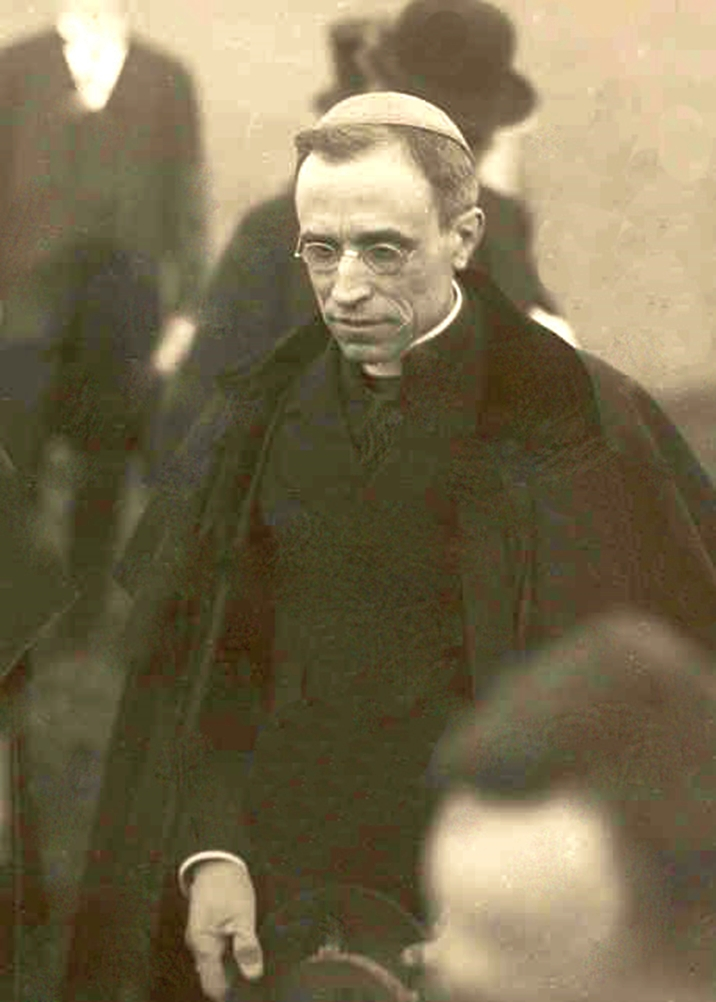
Eugenio Pacelli (future Pope Pius XII) was made titular archbishop of Sardis by Pope Benedict XV.

- Carlo Rossetti, c. 1641
- Domenico Invitti, c. 1726
- Binkentios Coressi (October 12, 1814 — March 7, 1835)
- Jean-Marie Mioland (April 2, 1849 — September 29, 1851)
- Pietro Gianelli (April 5, 1858 — March 15, 1875)
- Bernardino del Vago, c. 1879
- Vicenzo Vannutelli (January 23, 1880 — June 23, 1890)
- Salvatore Palmieri (December 14, 1891 — October 1, 1892)
- Giulio Tonti (July 15, 1893 — October 1, 1894)
- Benedetto Lorenzelli (November 30, 1896 — November 14, 1904)
- Giuseppe Aversa (May 25, 1906 — April 12, 1917)
- Eugenio Maria Giuseppe Giovanni Pacelli (April 20, 1917 — March 16, 1929)
- Arthur Hinsley (January 9, 1930 — April 1, 1935)
- Antonino Arata (July 11, 1935 — August 25, 1948)
- Giovanni Urbani (November 27, 1948 — April 14, 1955)
- Giuseppe Maria Sensi (May 21, 1955 — May 24, 1976)

== See also ==
- Byzantine churches at Sardis
